= Benjamin Franklin Morris II =

American labor leader (1876–1947)

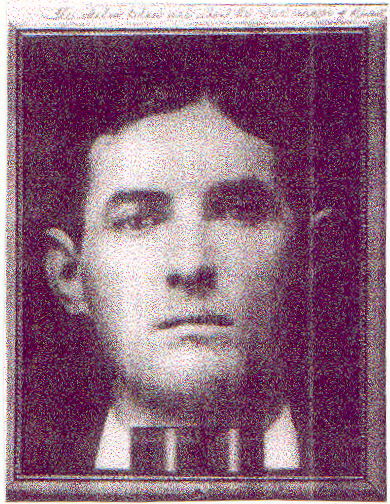
- Benjamin Franklin Morris c. 1899
- Born: June 19, 1876; Marmet, West Virginia, U.S.
- Died: 6 December 1947 (aged 71)
- Occupations: Politician, Union Executive, Inspector
- Known for: Paint Creek–Cabin Creek strike of 1912
- Board member of: United Mine Workers of America
- Spouses: Ella America Price (m. 1899) Anna Rippetoe (m. 1931)
- Children: 11

Mayor of Marmet
- In office 1920–1942

Delegate to West Virginia Democratic State Convention
- In office 1932–1933
- Constituency: Charleston District

Delegate to American Mining Congress
- In office 1911–1912 Serving with John Mitchell, Frank Hayes, John Phillip White
- Appointed by: William E. Glasscock
- Constituency: Charleston, West Virginia

Secretary of United Mine Workers of America
- In office 1906–1913

Personal details
- Party: Socialist (1900–1923), Progressive (1924–1937), Democrat (1932-1947)

Benjamin Franklin Morris II (June 19, 1876 - December 6, 1947) was an American coal miner, labor leader, activist, and mayor. From 1906 until 1913, Morris represented coal miners across the United States, and was the principal representative for miners in Paint Creek during the West Virginia coal wars. Morris was secretary of the United Mine Workers of America and on the UMWA's International Executive Board. During his time at UMWA he worked alongside labor rights activists Mother Jones, John Phillip White, John Mitchell, and Thomas Lewis. Morris was appointed in 1911 by West Virginia Governor William E. Glasscock to be a delegate to the American Mining Congress; served as a delegate to the West Virginia Democratic State Convention in 1932–33; and served 22 years as mayor of the town of Marmet, West Virginia.

== Early life ==
Morris was born to Benjamin Franklin Morris and Julia Alice Arthur in 1876, and was a coal miner at the age of 12 at Peerless Coal Mine in Paint Creek, West Virginia. The elder Morris was a coal miner and grew up in the mining camps, and was the great-grandson of Leonard Morris. At the age of 23 Benjamin Morris II married Ella America Price, and they had 11 children. In 1926, Ella died during pregnancy. Her father, Wade Price, died in 1908 as a result of a mining accident at Standard Mine, in Paint Creek.

== Labor rights ==
Morris served as Secretary of the Convention for the Bureau of Labor of West Virginia in 1905 and 1906 where he advocated for safer mining regulation, equipment, and proper ventilation. The special convention was to express the desires with reference to mining legislation that was held in Charleston, West Virginia on October 17 and 18.

== United Mine Workers of America ==
On January 2, 1908, Morris was in communication with UMWA Treasurer, and US Congressman William Bauchop Wilson where Wilson sent Morris $1,000 from donated UMWA funds to a newly created Monongah sufferers fund. Morris was in charge of distributing the funds to survivors of the Monongah mining disaster.

On January 13, 1912, Morris was re-elected as member of the International Executive Board.

In April 1912, a strike was conducted partly by the influence of the UMWA at the Paint Creek and Cabin Creek coal mines without violence. On May 10, 1912, coal owners hired the Baldwin–Felts Detective Agency to break the strike. The agency sent more than 300 mine guards led by Albert Felts, Lee Felts, and Tony Gaujot. Mother Jones arrived in June 1912, and detailed her experience in a memoir titled AUTOBIOGRAPHY OF MOTHER JONES published in 1925. In July 1912, on a Monday, Mother Jones was introduced to Morris as being a member of the UMWA National Board. Morris offered and provided Jones with a bodyguard whom he got from the sheriff after she expressed her intent on marching to Cabin Creek. Morris left Jones, and went directly to Governor William E. Glasscock and told the Governor to "send a company of the militia up to Cabin Creek" before a war sparked between the Baldwin-Felts Detective Agency and the armed miners. Glasscock responded by sending the National Guard, thus ending the Paint Creek–Cabin Creek strike of 1912. During an inquiry by the United States Senate Committee on Education and Labor on September 3, 1913, Morris was referenced as being the employee representative for all miners at Cabin Creek Consolidated Coal Co., Carbon Coal Co., Republic Coal Co., West Virginia Colliery Co., and Wake Forest Mining Co. in contracts between the Union (employees) and the mining company.

In August 1912, the National Guard deployed again to quell violence by the Baldwin–Felts Agency that resulted in many miners being beaten. After the National Guard disarmed the Agency men 500 miners quit their jobs. Subsequently, Morris and UMWA vice president C. C. Griffith created a new union organization with 500 members joining. Griffith and Morris visited the members and created a new district union in Paint Creek.

== Indictment ==
Several months after the Paint-Creek strike, Morris and 17 other executives at the United Mine Workers of America were indicted on four federal charges by the United States circuit court for the Southern District of West Virginia. Those also indicted included: John Phillip White - president of UMWA, and Frank Hayes, - vice president of UMWA for violating the Sherman Act and "conspiracy with restraint to trade and commerce", and "trying to fix the wages" of the mining employees in multiple states. The indictment charged that the persons, in the county of Kanawha and within the jurisdiction of the federal district court engaged in a combination and conspiracy in restraint of trade and commerce among the several states. It is charged that the indicted men have been agents and members of "an unincorporated voluntary organization of individuals and labor unions known as the United Mine Workers of America" and "having many thousands of members unlawfully combined and conspired together with the object and intent of unionizing and making members of said organization, the laborers employed in and around the coal mines in order that and with intent that said organization by regulating the wages to be paid to said laborers for their work could and would fix and control the price at which the coal mined in the state of West Virginia and compete with coal mined in the western part of Pennsylvania and in the state of Ohio, Indiana, and Illinois in the markets of the states if the United States outside of West Virginia. Following the indictment, a Senate inquiry was opened into the conditions of the Paint Creek Coal Mines. All charges were eventually dropped.

== Life ==
In 1910, Morris was elected as a Member of the Kanawha County Board of Education.

From 1916 to 1931 he was affiliated with the Kanawha Coal Operators Association as Labor Conciliator, Mine Inspector and Assistant Secretary. Ben served as mayor of Marmet for 22 years. He was listed 1930, and 1940 Kanawha County Census as mayor, and also Deputy Sheriff.

In 1919, Morris served as Assistant Secretary at the newly created Kanawha Coal Operators Association that maintained, inspected, and enforced mining regulations.

On May 28, 1936, Morris was mentioned in the Congressional Record, 74th Congress of the United States Senate pertaining to “Works Progress Administration in West Virginia”. Morris reflected positively on the administration stating, “the projects have operated satisfactory to the citizens of the town, and in a manner most commendable to the WPA officials.”

In 1937, Morris was challenged by Republican Clyde Buckland for mayor - Morris was running as a Progressive. He subsequently defeated Buckland, and was re-elected for another term in July 1937.

On May 7, 1947, just before his death, Morris was re-nominated for mayor at the State Democratic Convention.
