= Michael D. Ratchford =

4th President of the United Mine Workers
- In office 1897–1898
- Preceded by: Phil Penna
- Succeeded by: John Mitchell

Personal details
- Born: August 1860 County Clare, Ireland
- Died: December 12, 1927 (aged 67) Massillon, Ohio, U.S.
- Occupation: Miner; Labor leader; Civil servant; Business executive
- Known for: President, United Mine Workers of America

Michael D. Ratchford (August 1860 – December 12, 1927) was an Irish-American labor leader and president of the United Mine Workers of America (UMWA) from 1897 to 1898. Ratchford is remembered for his leadership of a coal strike during the summer of 1897, which lead to the establishment of a national scale of wages and hours for the industry.

== Background ==
Michael D. Ratchford was born in August 1860 in County Clare, Ireland. He attended public school and emigrated to the United States in 1872 with his parents. The family settled in Massillon, Ohio, where Ratchford would marry the former Deborah Jordan in 1884.

== Career ==
Ratchford started working in coal mines when he was just 12 years old. He became active in the United Mine Workers of America after its formation in 1890 and was elected local union president that year. He was hired as an organizer by the international union in 1893 and was elected President of UMWA District 6 in 1895. After UMWA president Phil Penna declined to run for a full term in 1895, Ratchford was elected as his successor.

During his single term as UMWA president, Ratchford dramatically re-invigorated the union, which had been reduced to a membership of only 10,000 members with a treasury of just $600 at the time. He led a hugely successful national coal miners' strike in July 1897 which involved more than 100,000 workers. Supported by the American Federation of Labor, the strike lasted 12 weeks and shut down almost all coal production in the United States. The strike was settled when mine owners agreed to sign a national master contract, the Central Competitive Field Agreement. It covered all coal-producing states except West Virginia, a state in which the miners had failed to join the strike in significant measure. The agreement established the eight-hour day and dramatically raised wages to 65 cents per ton. More than 23,000 miners joined the union, raising its membership to 33,000 and putting its finances on firm financial ground.

Ratchford resigned as President in 1898 to serve on the United States Industrial Commission, remaining on it for two years. An ardent Republican and personal friend of both William McKinley and Mark Hanna, Ratchford was appointed Ohio's commissioner of labor statistics in 1900, a position which he would retain for eight years. In 1909, Ratchford was named commissioner of the Ohio Coal Operators, and in 1913, assumed the same position with the Illinois Coal Operators' Association. He served in this last position until his death.

=== Death ===
Michael Ratchford died age 67 in Massillon on December 12, 1927.

== See also ==
- John Mitchell (United Mine Workers)
- Thomas Lewis
- John Phillip White
- John L. Lewis

| Preceded by Phil Penna | President, United Mine Workers of America; 1897 - 1898 | Succeeded by John Mitchell |
