= Lackawanna County Courthouse =

- Lackawanna County Courthouse and John Mitchell Monument
- U.S. National Register of Historic Places
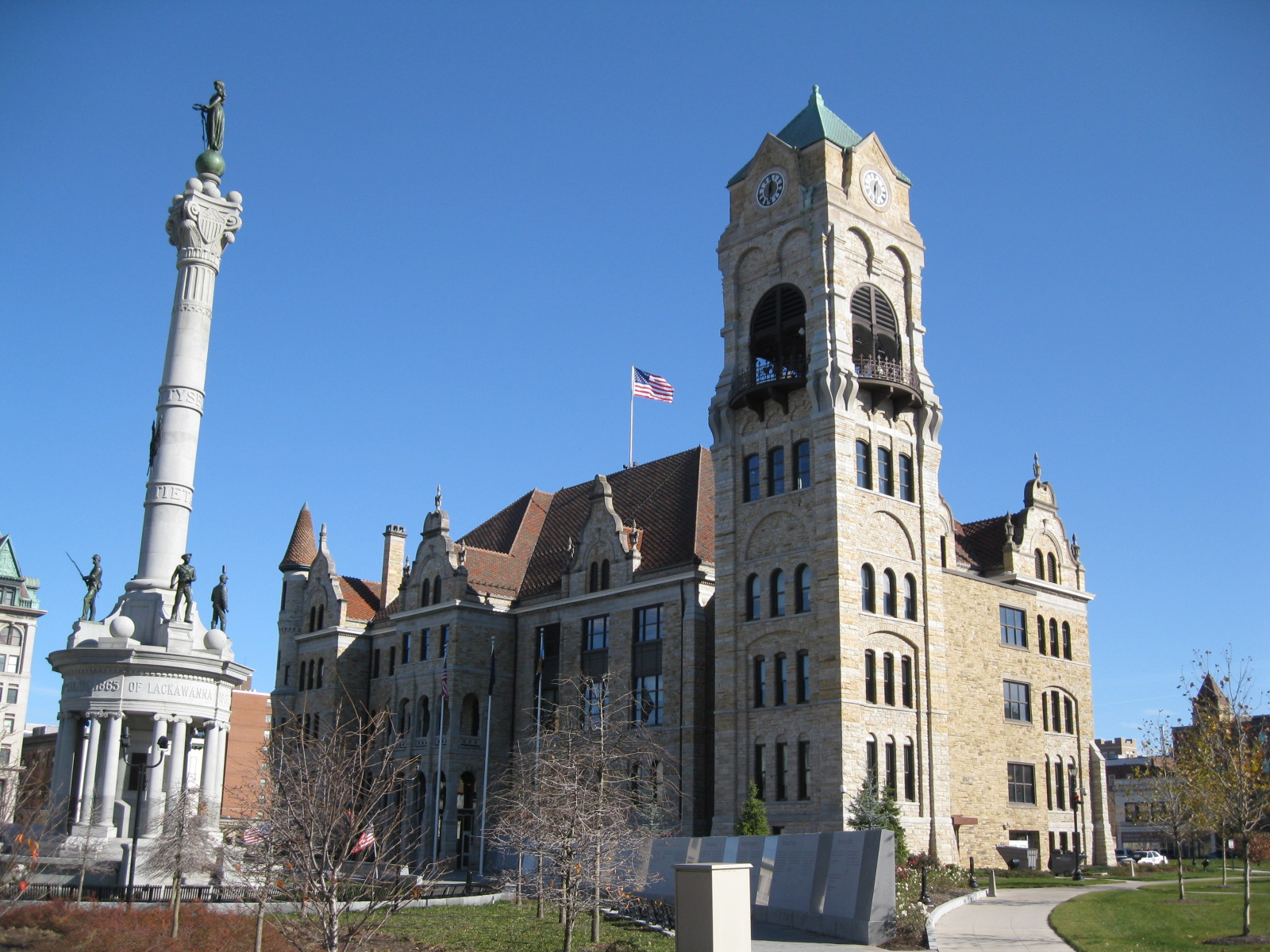
- Lackawanna County Courthouse, November 2009

- Location within Pennsylvania Location within the United States
- Interactive map of Lackawanna County Courthouse and John Mitchell Monument
- Location: 200 N. Washington Ave., Scranton, Pennsylvania
- Coordinates: 41°24′29″N 75°39′46″W
- Area: 4.7 acres (1.9 ha)
- Built: 1884
- Architect: Multiple
- Architectural style: Romanesque
- MPS: Anthracite-Related Resources of Northeastern Pennsylvania MPS
- NRHP reference No.: 97001257
- Added to NRHP: November 5, 1997

The Lackawanna County Courthouse is an historic courthouse building that is located in Scranton, Lackawanna County, in the U.S. state of Pennsylvania.

== History and architectural features ==
Built in 1884, this historic structure is a three-and-one-half-story, rectangular, masonry building, with a raised basement. Designed in the Romanesque Revival style, it was enlarged in 1896, with the addition of a third story and reconstruction of the roof to include a number of eclectic design elements. This building measures approximately 100 by 140 feet (30 by 43 m) and features a five-story clock tower. The roof of the structure is covered with Conosera tile produced by Ludowici. A courthouse wing was built in 1964.

This courthouse was the site of the first session of the 1902 Anthracite Coal Strike Commission.

It was added to the National Register of Historic Places in 1997, along with the monument to John Mitchell.

== John Mitchell Monument ==
The monument to John Mitchell (1870–1919) was erected in 1924. The tribute to the head of the United Mine Workers consists of a granite monolith with a niche, enclosing a bronze statue of Mitchell.

== See also ==
- List of state and county courthouses in Pennsylvania

== Gallery ==
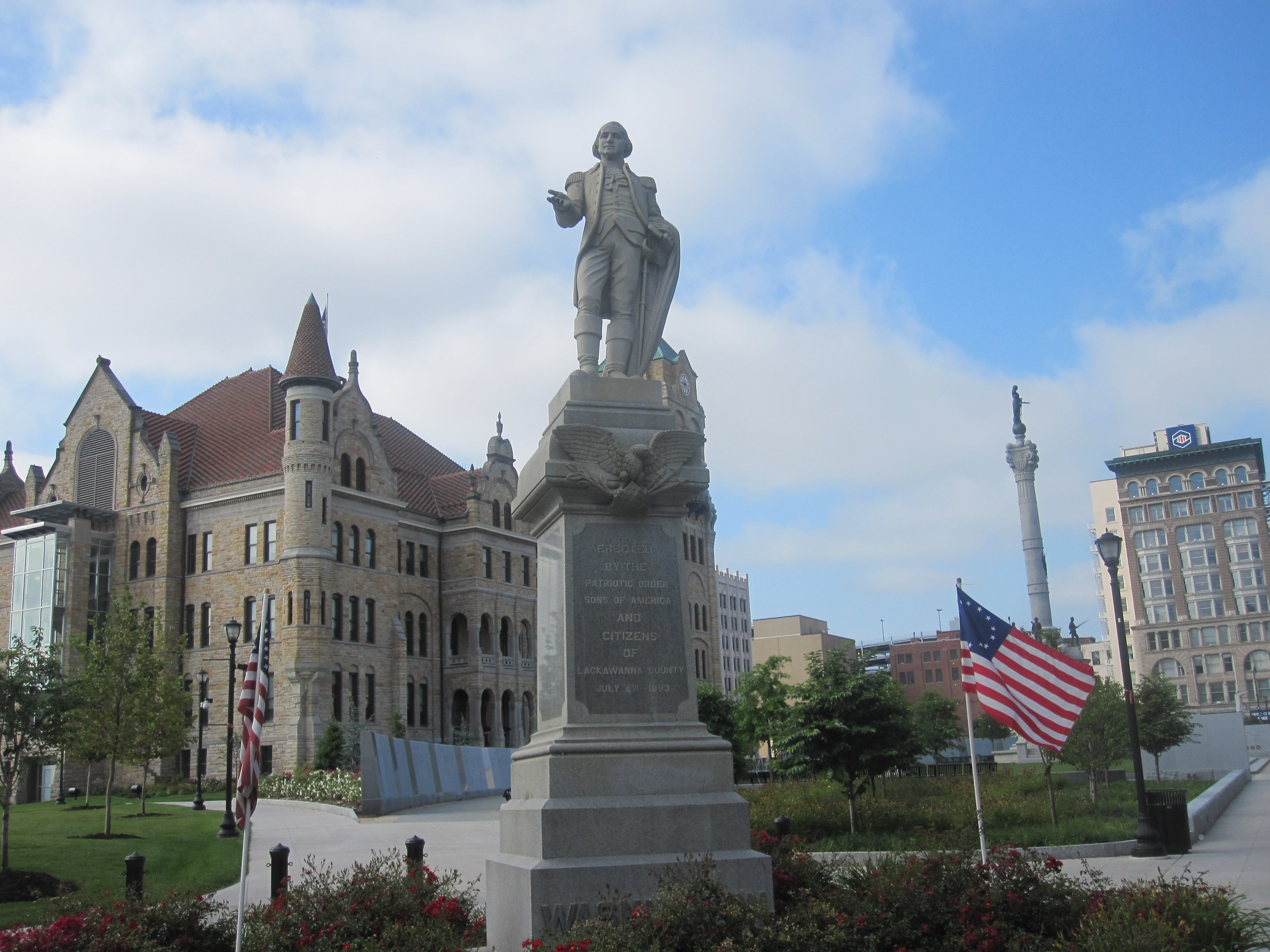
Washington Monument

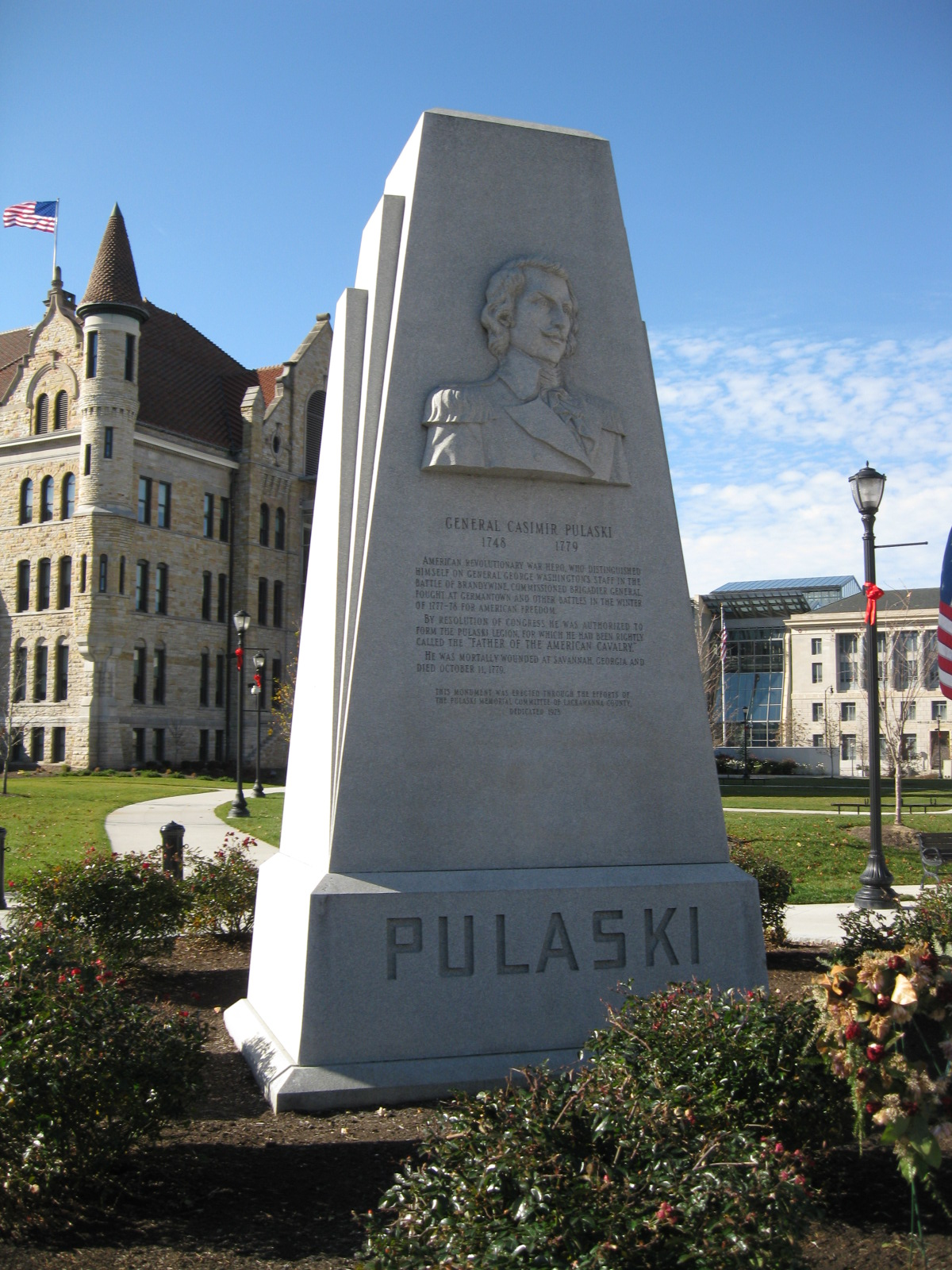
Kosciuszko Monument

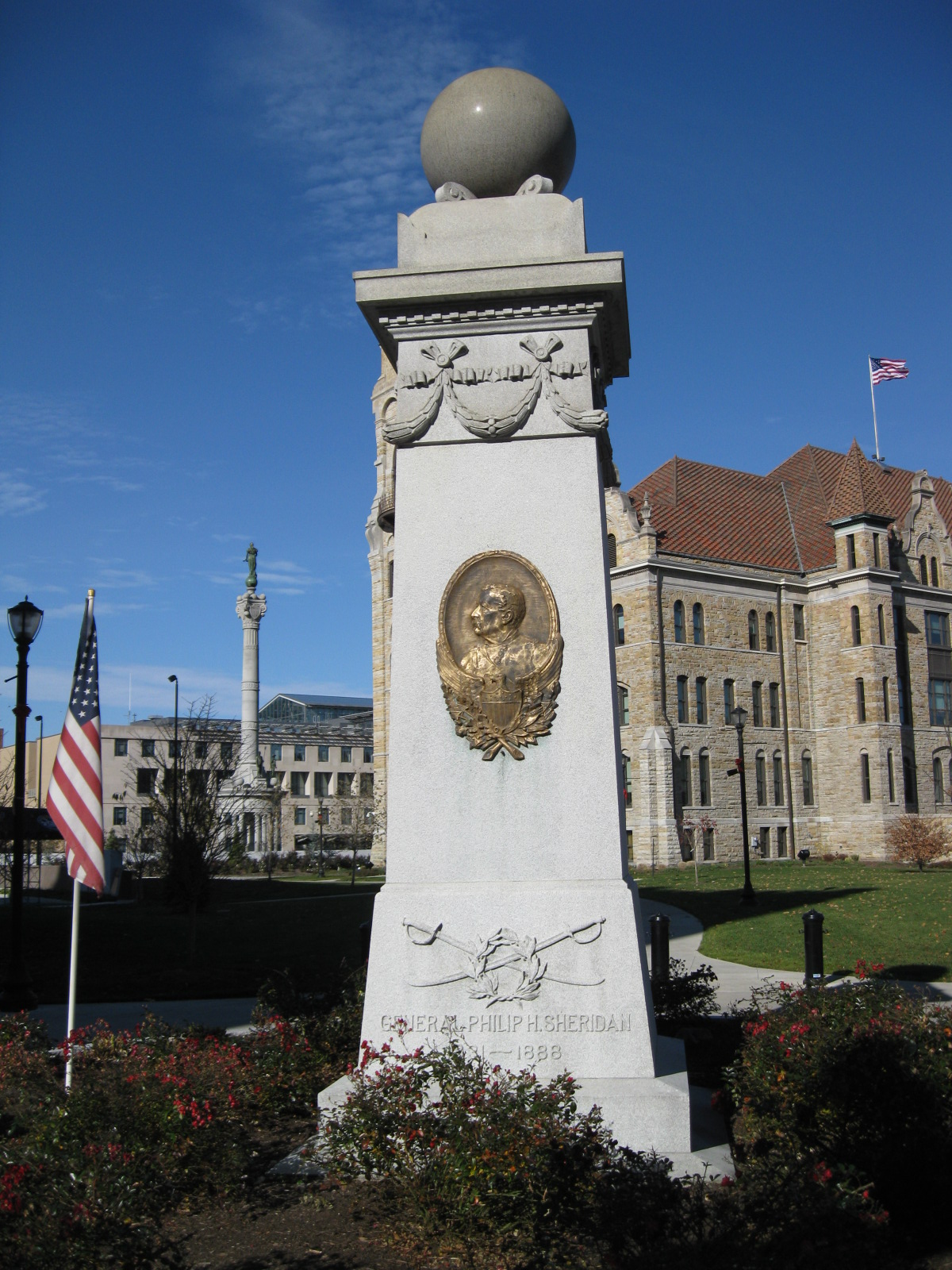
General Philip H. Sheridan Monument

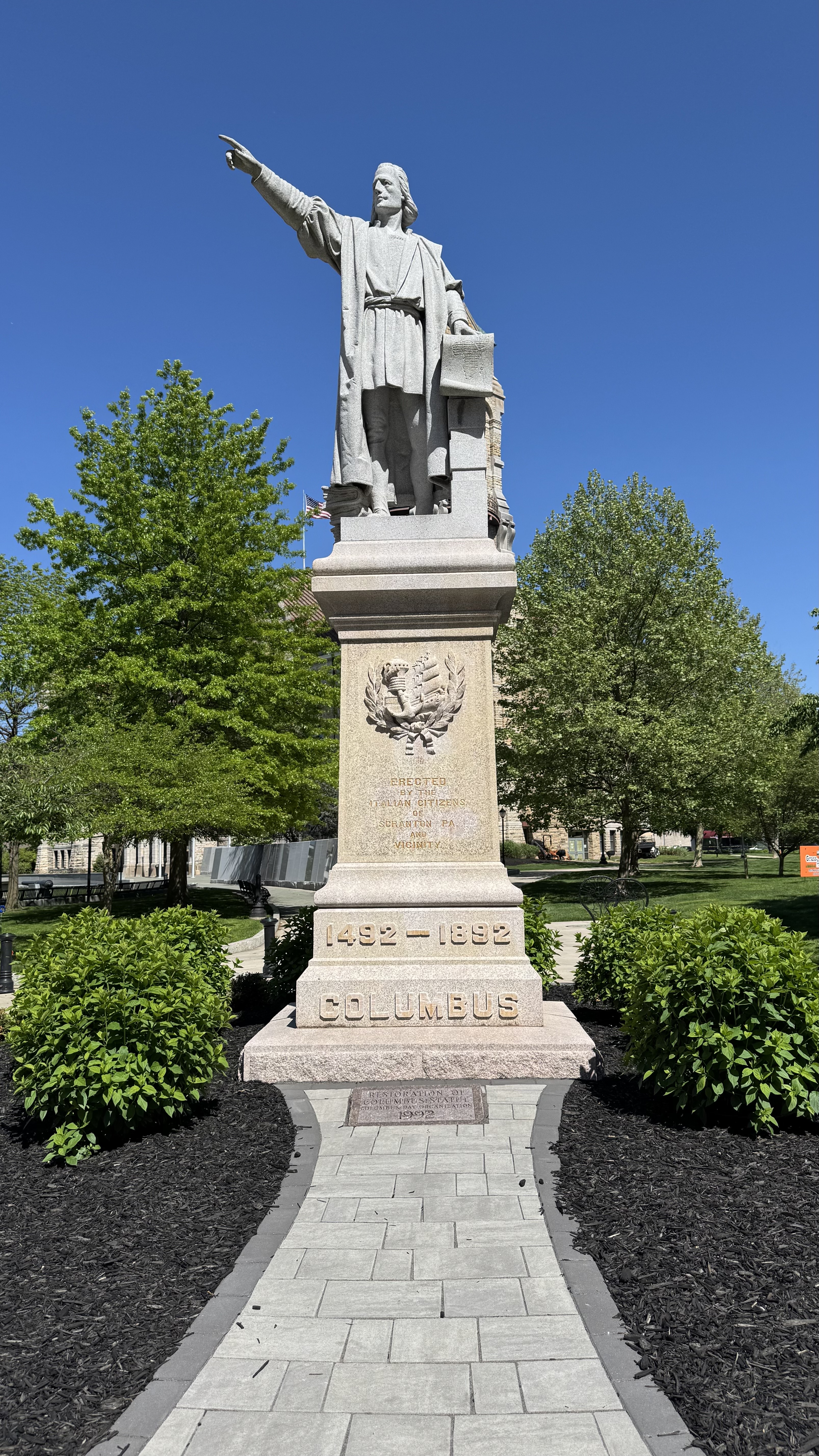
Christopher Columbus Monument

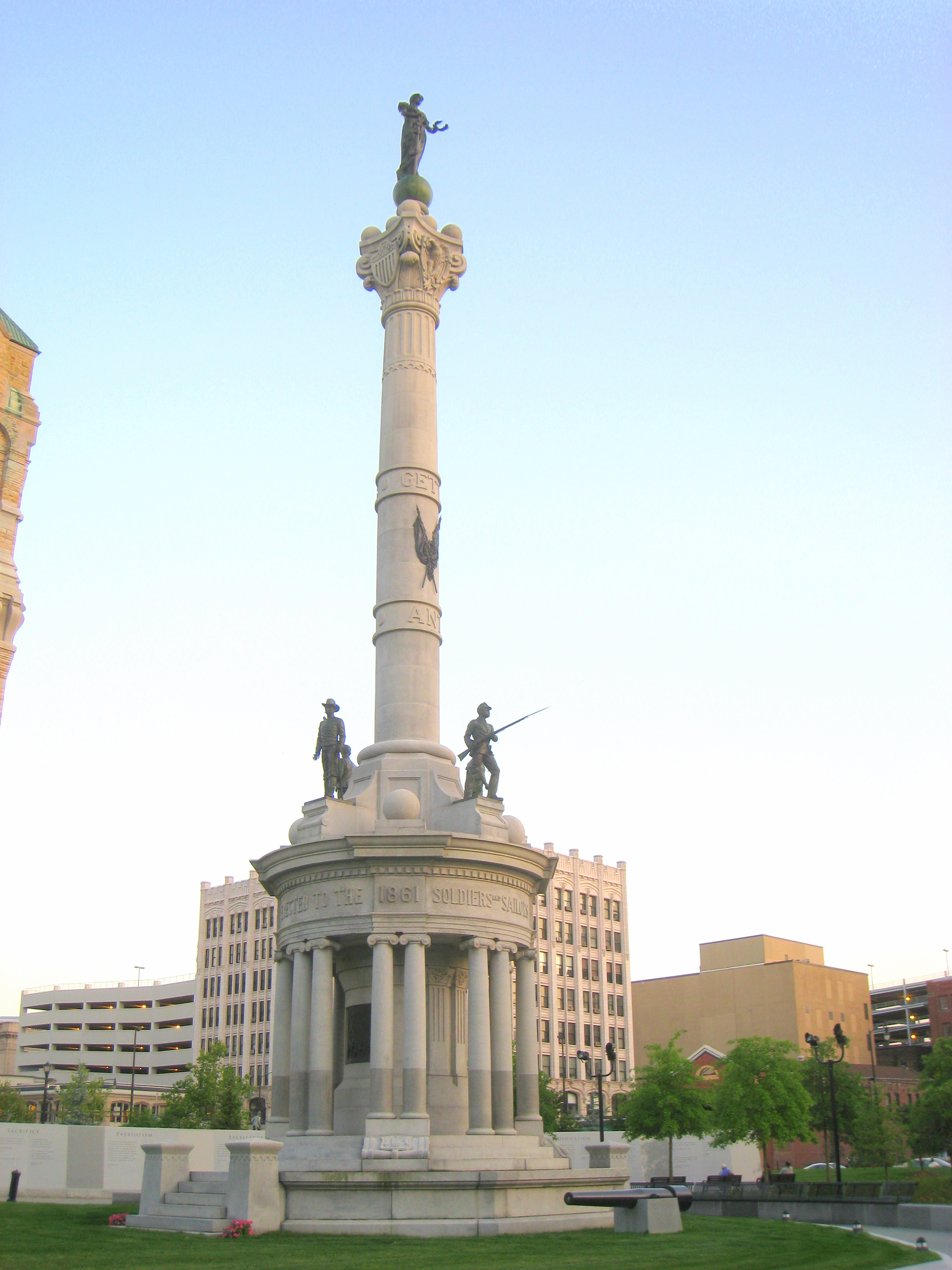
Lackawana County Soldiers and Sailors Monument

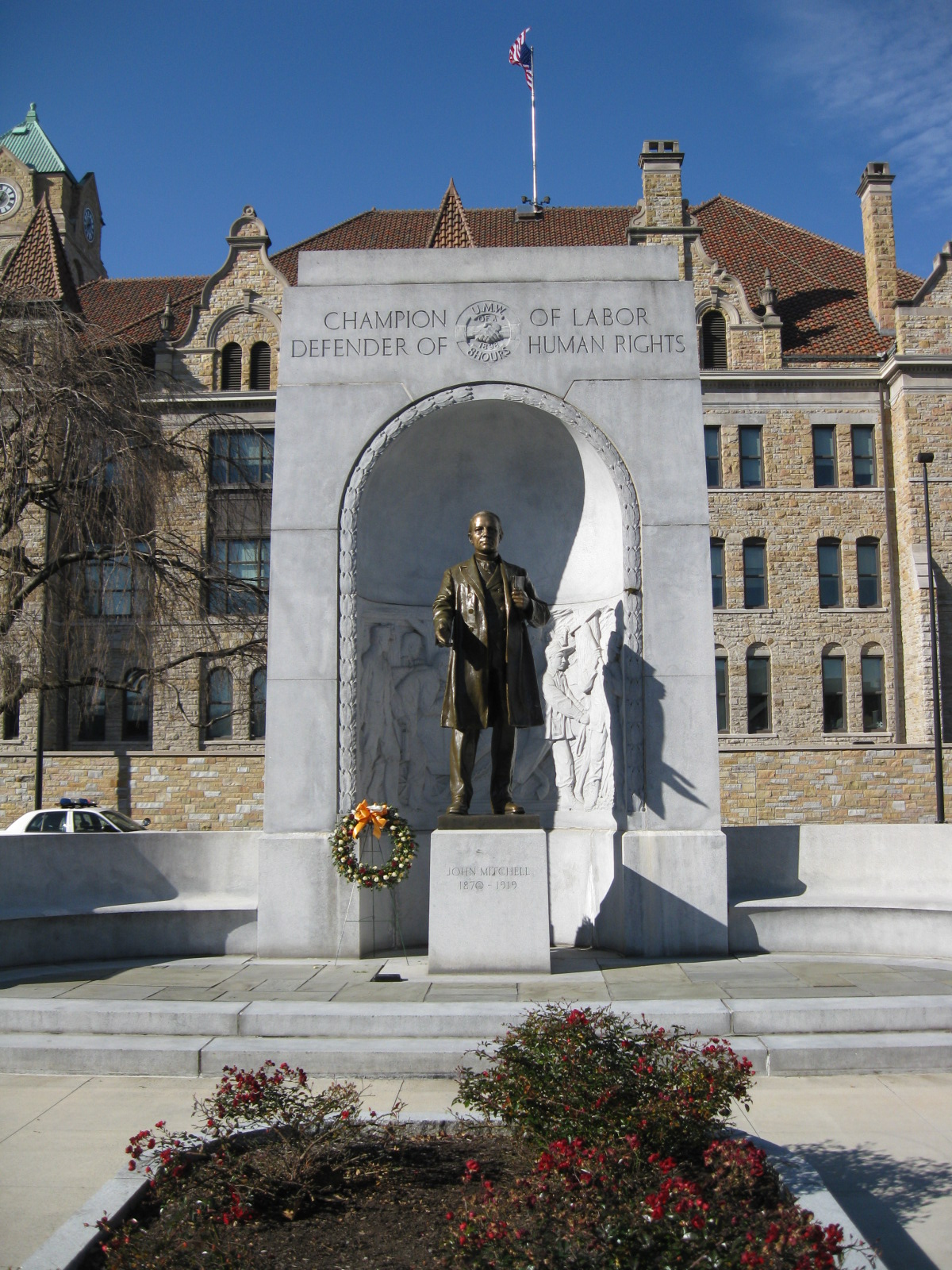
John Mitchell Monument

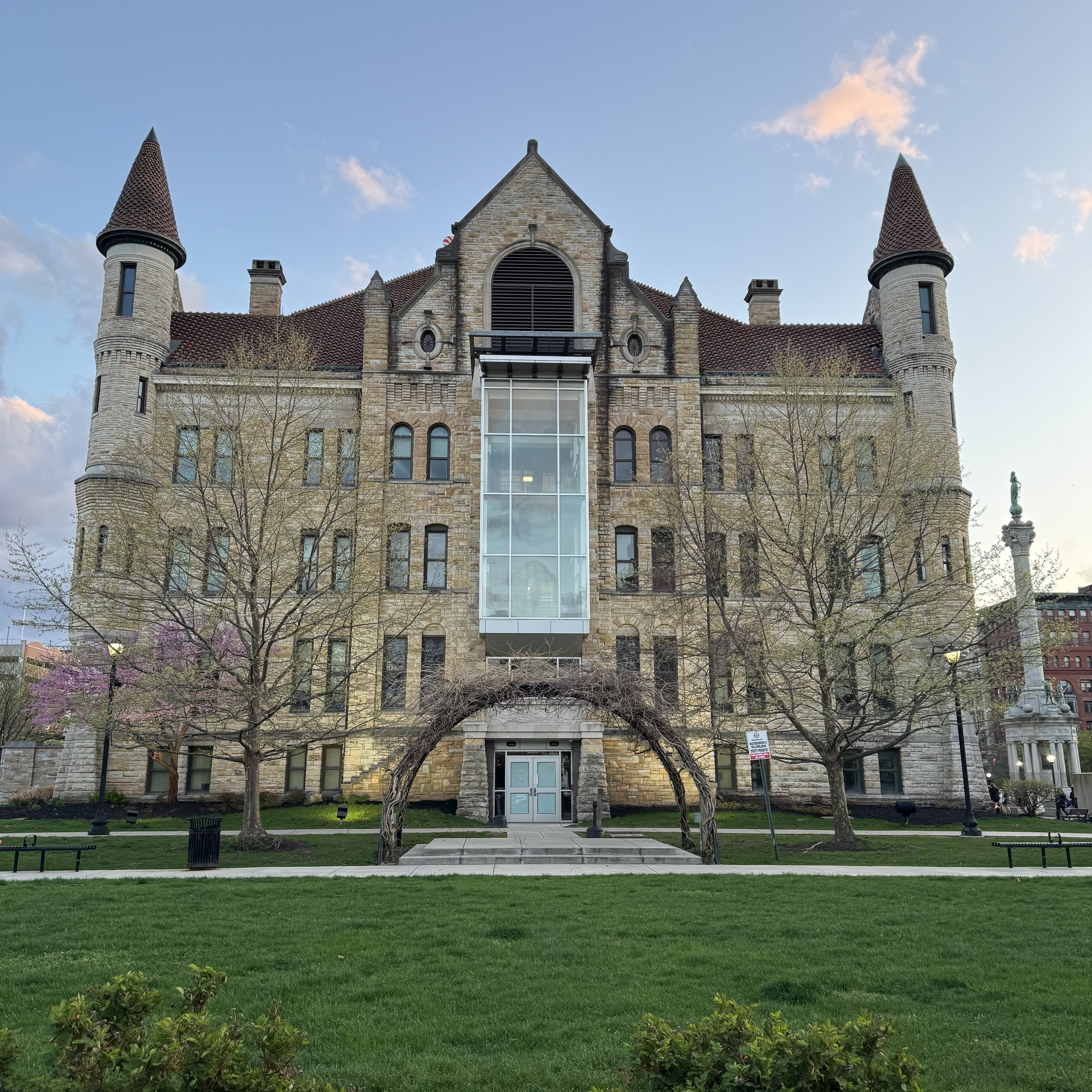
View from the northeast side
