= John L. Lewis =

American miner and labor leader (1880–1969)

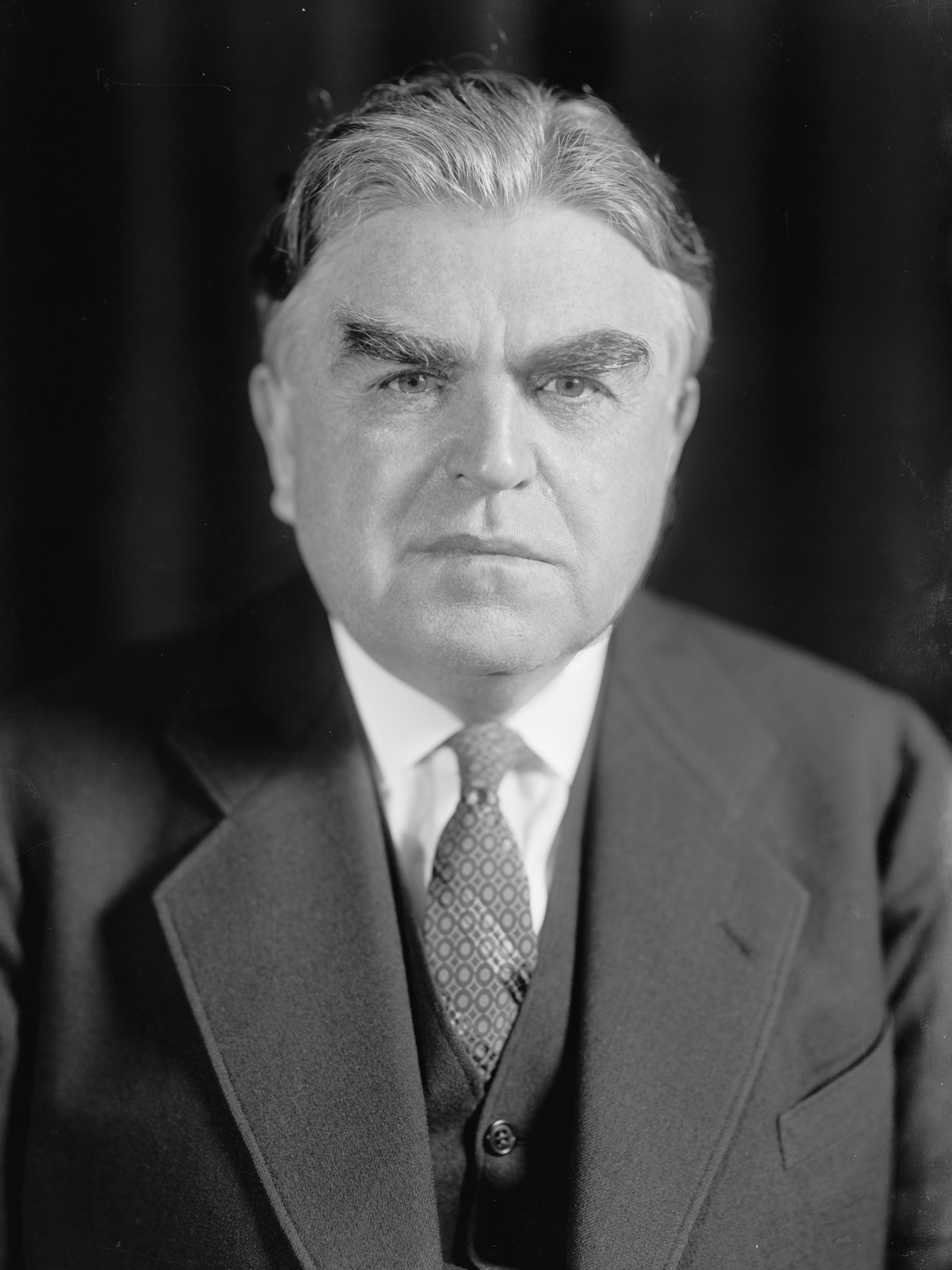
- Portrait by Harris & Ewing c. 1930s–1940s

9th President of the United Mine Workers
- In office February 7, 1920 – January 15, 1960; Acting since April 1919
- Preceded by: Frank Hayes
- Succeeded by: Thomas Kennedy

1st President of the Congress of Industrial Organizations
- In office November 9, 1935 – November 23, 1940
- Preceded by: Office established
- Succeeded by: Philip Murray

Vice President of the United Mine Workers
- In office October 26, 1917 – February 7, 1920
- Preceded by: Frank Hayes
- Succeeded by: Philip Murray

Personal details
- Born: John Llewellyn Lewis; February 12, 1880 Cleveland, Iowa, U.S.
- Died: June 11, 1969 (aged 89) Alexandria, Virginia, U.S.
- Resting place: Oak Ridge Cemetery
- Party: Republican
- Spouse: Myrta Bell (m. 1907; died 1942)
- Children: 3

John Llewellyn Lewis (February 12, 1880 – June 11, 1969) was an American leader of organized labor who served as the ninth president of the United Mine Workers of America (UMW) from 1920 to 1960 and the first president of the Congress of Industrial Organizations (CIO), which organized millions of industrial workers during the Great Depression, from 1935 to 1940. Lewis was a major figure in the history of coal mining and the American labor movement; his supporters credited him with high wages, pensions, and medical benefits in the mining industry. Throughout his career in the public eye, Lewis was frequently caricatured and came to represent the broader American labor movement.

Lewis was born to Welsh immigrants in 1880 and raised in Iowa, where he entered work in 1897 as a coal miner without a high school education. In 1906, he was elected as a delegate to the UMW national convention. After a brief and unsuccessful attempt at politics and business, Lewis returned to mining and was elected president of the UMW local in Panama, Illinois. In 1911, Samuel Gompers hired Lewis to work for the American Federation of Labor (AFL) as a full-time organizer.

In 1919, Lewis led the first major union-led coal strike and the next year, he was elected president of the UMW, then the largest and most influential trade union in the United States. He remained its leader for four decades. As president, he placed locals under centralized leadership and supported principles of industrial unionism and "competitive capitalism," opposing efforts by communists, led by William Z. Foster, to organize within the UMW. His long tenure as UMW president was controversial within the labor movement. Supporters lauded material gains for miners under his leadership and his cooperative approach to legislative reforms, while socialists denounced him as a class traitor.

Lewis was the leading force behind the establishment of the Congress of Industrial Organizations to promote the principle of industrial unionism within the AFL and served its first president from 1935 to 1940. The CIO brought together ten allied industrial unions to promote the principles of industrial unionism in the United States and succeeded at winning collective bargaining agreements with General Motors and U.S. Steel, two of the most anti-union corporations in the United States at the time. In 1938, the CIO was expelled from the AFL and entered a period of competitive organizing against its parent federation which ended with their 1955 merger as the AFL-CIO.

Politically, Lewis was a member of the Republican Party but played a major role in helping Democratic president Franklin D. Roosevelt win a landslide re-election victory in 1936. Lewis broke with Roosevelt in 1940 over Roosevelt's support for growing American involvement in World War II. He supported Republican businessman Wendell Willkie instead. After Willkie lost, Lewis resigned as president of the CIO and withdrew the UMW to join the American Federation of Labor (AFL). After the attack on Pearl Harbor, however, Lewis pledged his and his union's full support to the war effort.

== Early life and rise to power ==
John Llewellyn Lewis was born on February 12, 1880 in or near Cleveland, Lucas County, Iowa (distinct from the present township of Cleveland in Davis County), to Thomas H. Lewis and Ann (Watkins) Lewis, immigrants from Llangurig, Wales. Cleveland was a company town, built around a coal mine developed one mile east of the town of Lucas. His mother and grandparents were members of the Reorganized Church of Jesus Christ of Latter Day Saints (RLDS), and the boy was raised in the church's views regarding alcohol and sexual propriety, as well as a just social order that favored the poor. While his maternal grandfather was an RLDS pastor and Lewis periodically donated to his local RLDS church for the rest of his life, there is no definite evidence that he formally joined the Midwestern Mormon denomination.

Lewis attended three years of high school in Des Moines and at the age of 17 went to work in the Big Hill Mine at Lucas. In 1906, Lewis was elected a delegate to the United Mine Workers (UMW) national convention. In 1907, he ran for mayor of Lucas and launched a feed-and-grain distributorship. Both were failures and Lewis returned to coal mining.

He moved to Panama, Illinois, where in 1909 he was elected president of the UMW local. In 1911 Samuel Gompers, the head of the AFL, hired Lewis as a full-time union organizer. Lewis traveled throughout Pennsylvania and the Midwest as an organizer and trouble-shooter, especially in coal and steel districts.

== United Mine Workers of America ==
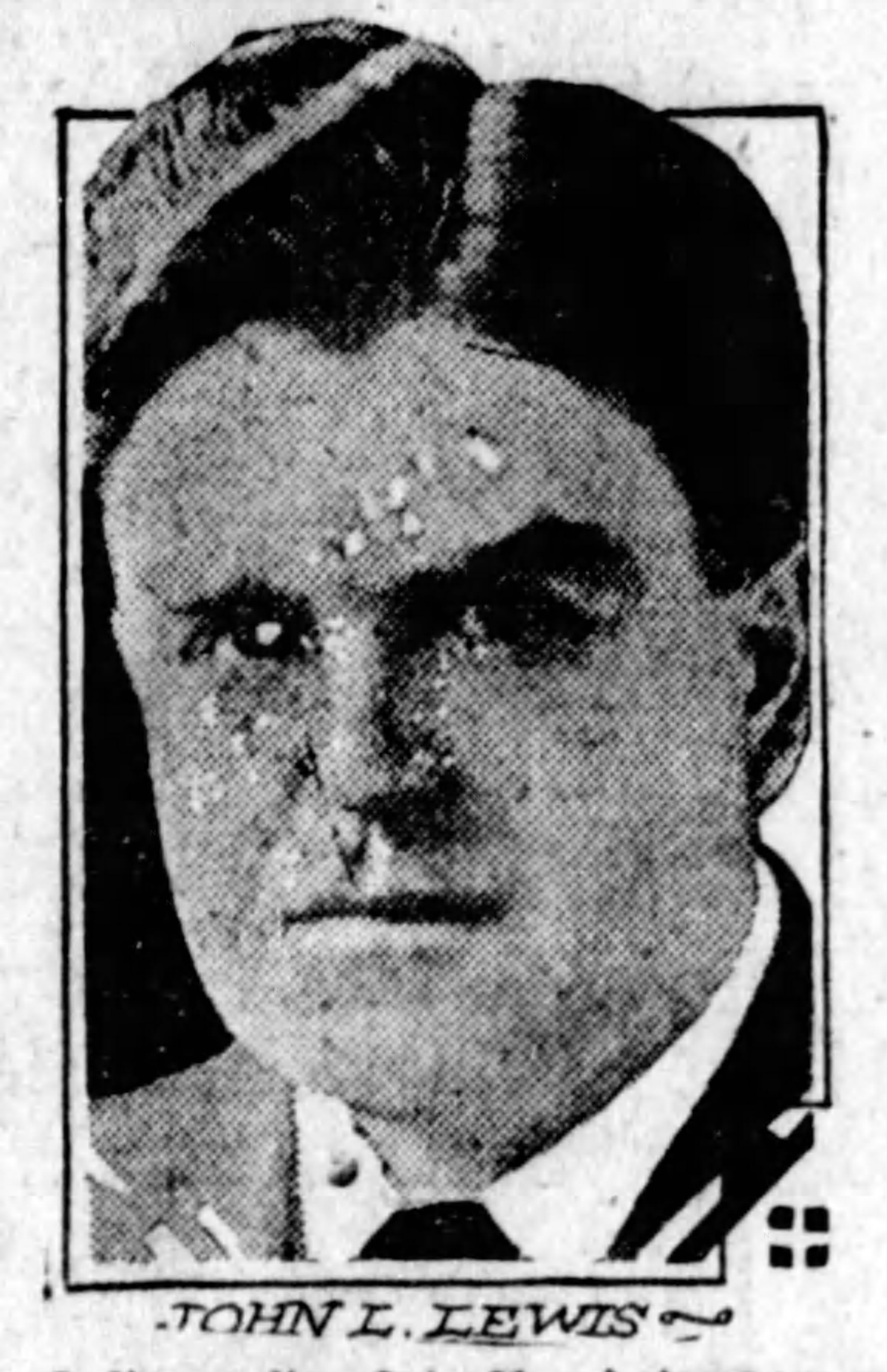
Lewis c. 1919

After serving as statistician and then as vice-president for the UMWA, Lewis became that union's acting president in 1919. On November 1, 1919, he called the first major coal union strike, and 400,000 miners walked off their jobs. President Woodrow Wilson obtained an injunction, which Lewis obeyed, telling the rank and file, "We cannot fight the Government." In 1920, Lewis was elected president of the UMWA. He quickly asserted himself as a dominant figure in what was then the largest and most influential trade union in the country.

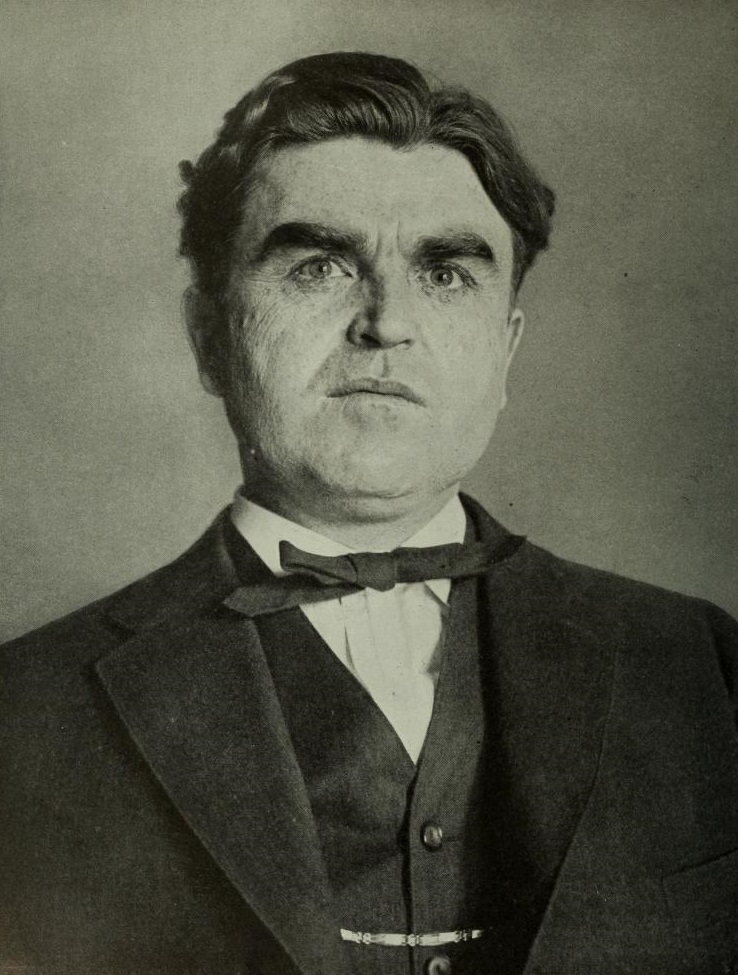
Lewis c. 1922

Coal miners worldwide were sympathetic to socialism, and in the 1920s, Communists systematically tried to seize control of UMWA locals. William Z. Foster, the Communist leader, opposed dual unions in favor of organizing within the UMWA. The radicals were most successful in the bituminous (soft) coal regions of the Midwest, where they used local organizing drives to gain control of locals, sought a national labor political party, and demanded federal nationalization of the industry. Lewis, committed to cooperation among labor, management, and government, took tight control of the union.

He placed the once-autonomous districts under centralized receivership, packed the union bureaucracy with men directly beholden to him, and used UMWA conventions and publications to discredit his critics. The fight was bitter but Lewis used armed force, red-baiting, and ballot-box stuffing and, in 1928, expelled the leftists. As Hudson (1952) shows, they started a separate union, the National Miners' Union. In Southern Illinois, amidst widespread violence, the Progressive Mine Workers of America challenged Lewis but were beaten back. After 1935, Lewis invited the radical organizers to work for his CIO organizing drives, and they soon gained powerful positions in CIO unions, including auto workers and electrical workers.

Lewis was often denounced as a despotic leader. He repeatedly expelled his political rivals from the UMWA, including John Walker, John Brophy, Alexander Howat and Adolph Germer. Communists in District 26 (Nova Scotia), including Canadian labor legend J. B. McLachlan, were banned from running for the union executive after a strike in 1923. McLachlan described him as "a traitor" to the working class. Lewis nonetheless commanded great loyalty from many of his followers, even those he had exiled in the past.

A powerful speaker and strategist, Lewis used the nation's dependence on coal to increase the wages and improve the safety of miners, even during several severe recessions. He masterminded a five-month strike, ensuring that the increase in wages gained during World War I would not be lost. In 1921 Lewis challenged Samuel Gompers, who had led the AFL for nearly forty years, for the presidency of the AFL. William Green, one of his subordinates within the Mine Workers at the time, nominated him; William Hutcheson, the President of the Carpenters, supported him. Gompers won. Three years later, on Gompers' death, Green succeeded him as AFL President.

In 1924 Lewis, a Republican, framed a plan for a three-year contract between the UMWA and the coal operators, providing for a pay rate of $7.50 per day ($141 in 2025 dollars). President Coolidge and then-Secretary of Commerce Herbert Hoover were impressed with the plan, and Lewis was offered the post of Secretary of Labor in Coolidge's cabinet. Lewis declined, a decision he later regretted. Without government support, the contract talks failed and coal operators hired non-union miners. The UMWA treasury was drained, but Lewis was able to maintain the union and his position within it. He was successful in winning the 1925 anthracite (hard coal) miners' strike by his oratorical skills.

=== Great Depression ===
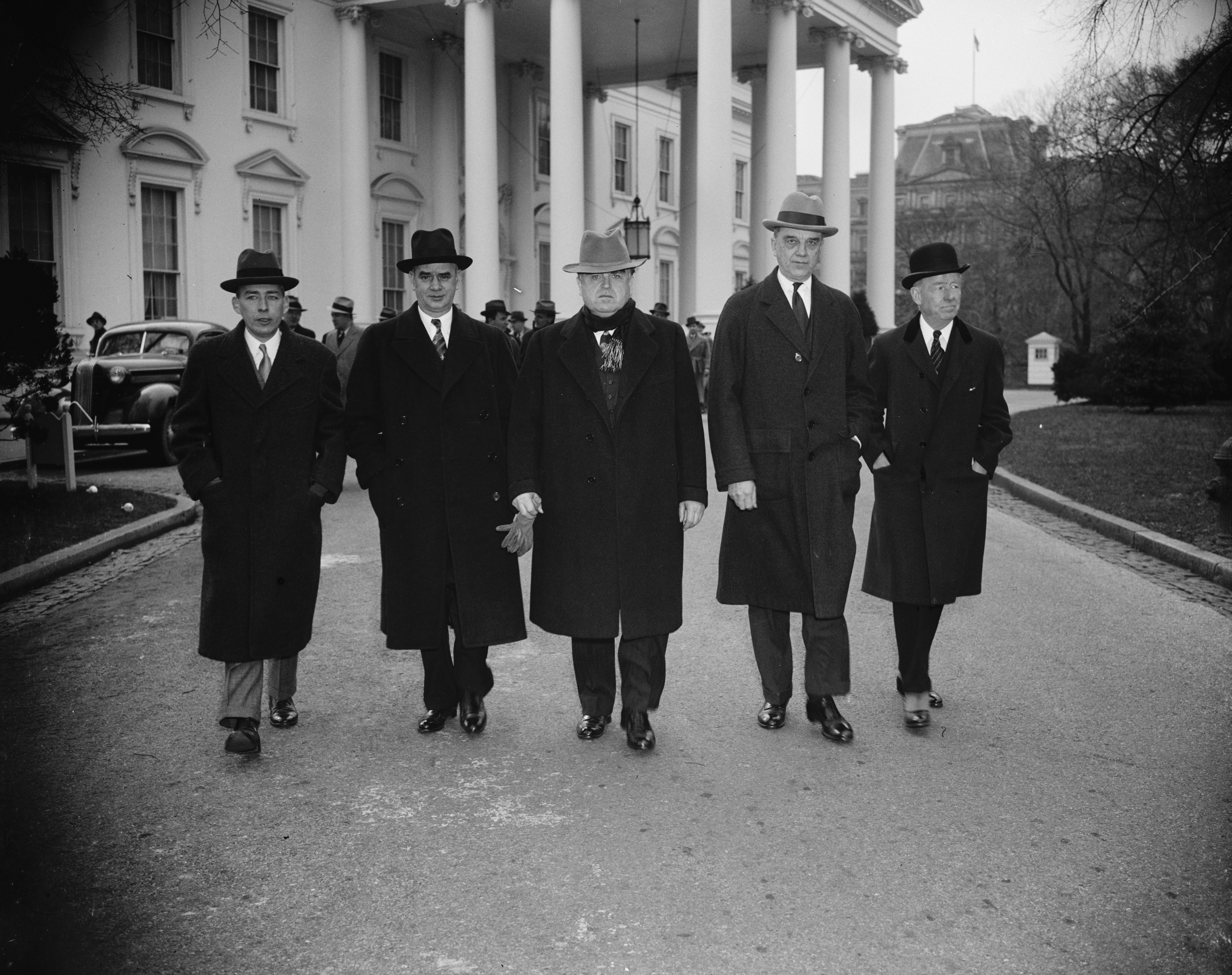
Labor and business leaders leaving the White House after a meeting with President Franklin D. Roosevelt, January 14, 1938. (L-R): Adolf A. Berle, Philip Murray, John L. Lewis, Owen D. Young, Thomas W. Lamont.

Lewis supported Republican Herbert Hoover for US president in 1928; in 1932, as the Great Depression bore brutally on the mining camps, he officially backed Hoover but quietly supported Democrat Franklin D. Roosevelt. In 1936, his union made the largest single contribution, over $500,000, to Roosevelt's successful campaign for reelection.

Lewis was appointed a member of the Labor Advisory Board and the National Labor Board of the National Recovery Administration in 1933; he used these positions to raise wages of miners and reduce competition. He gambled on a massive membership drive and won, as he piggybacked on FDR's popularity: "The President wants you to join the UMW!" Coal miners represented many ethnic groups, and Lewis shrewdly realized that they shared a faith in Roosevelt; he was careful not to antagonize any of the immigrant ethnic groups, and he appealed to African-American members as well.

He secured the passage of the Guffey Coal Act in 1935, which was superseded by Guffey-Vinson Act in 1937 after the 1935 act was declared by the US Supreme Court to be unconstitutional. Both of acts were favorable to miners. Lewis had long had the idea that the highly competitive bituminous coal industry, with its sharp ups and downs and cut-throat competition, could be stabilized by a powerful union that set a standard wage scale and could keep recalcitrant owners in line with selective strikes. The acts made that possible, and coal miners entered a golden era. At all times, Lewis rejected socialism and promoted competitive capitalism.

== Congress of Industrial Organizations ==
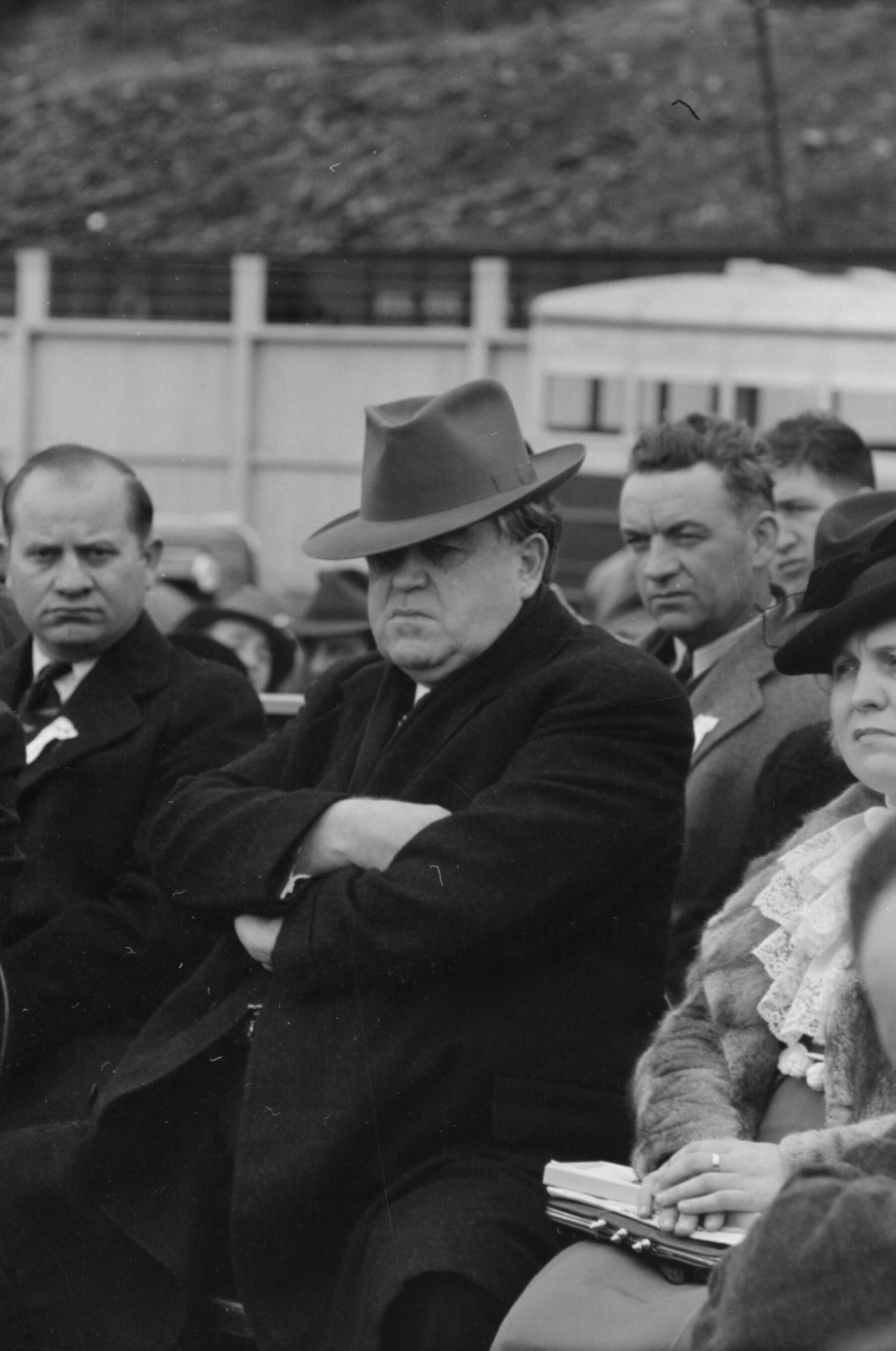
Lewis at a 1938 labor rally in Shenandoah, Pennsylvania, meeting with mine workers.

With the open support of the AFL and the tacit support of the UMWA, Franklin D. Roosevelt was nominated and elected president in 1932, and Lewis benefited from the New Deal programs that followed. Many of his members received relief. Lewis helped secure passage of the Guffey Coal Act of 1935, which raised prices and wages, but it was declared unconstitutional by the Supreme Court. Thanks to the 1935 National Labor Relations Act, union membership grew rapidly, especially in the UMWA. Lewis and the UMW were major financial backers of Roosevelt's reelection in 1936 and were firmly committed to the New Deal.

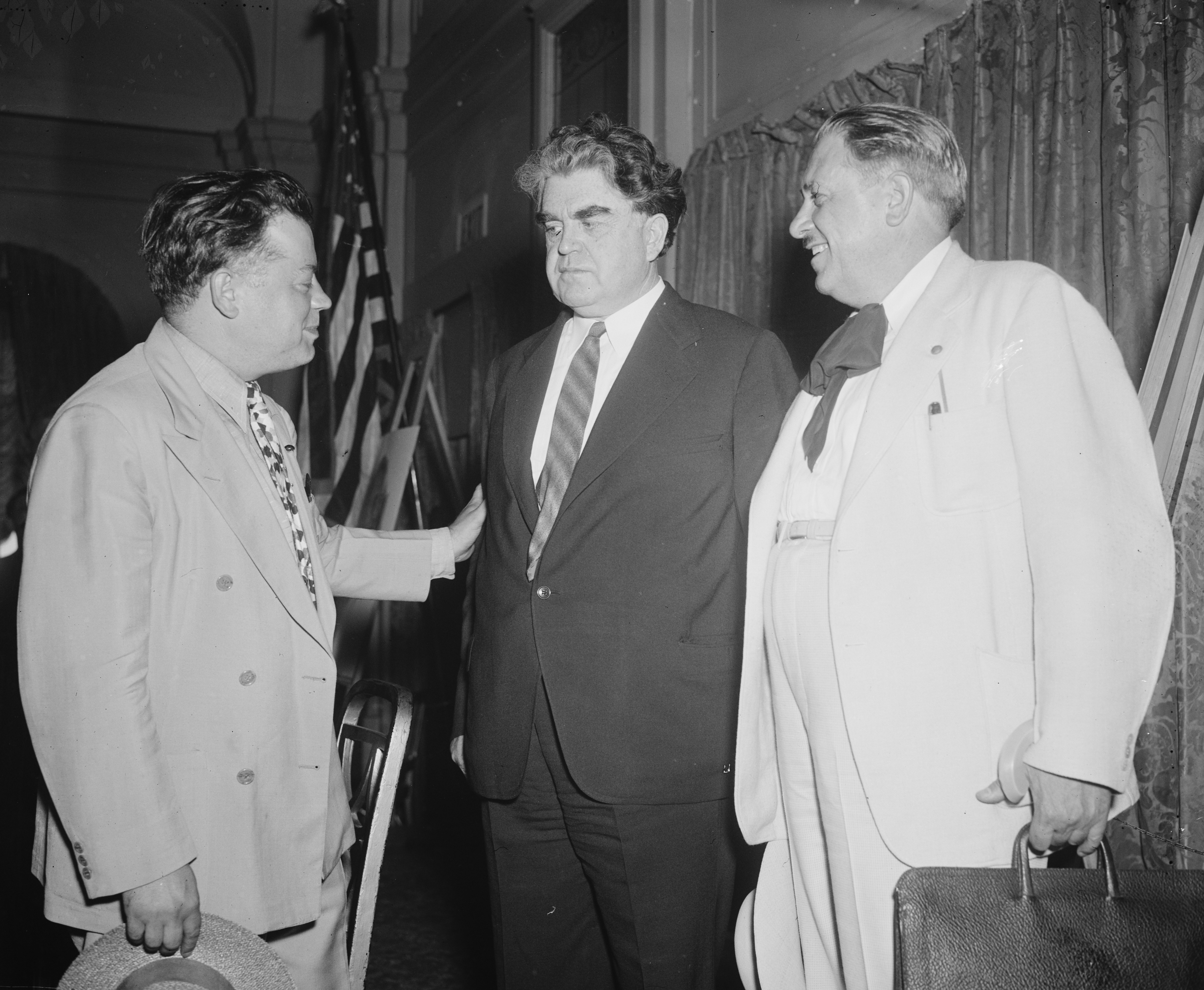
Lewis (center) with David Dubinsky (left) and Luigi Antonini (right) at the Labor's Non-Partisan League convention in Washington, D.C., August 1, 1936

At the AFL's annual convention in 1934, Lewis gained an endorsement from them of the principle of industrial unionism, as opposed to limitations to skilled workers. His goal was to unionize 400,000 steel workers, using his UMWA resources (augmented by leftists he had expelled in 1928). With the leaders of nine other large industrial unions and the UMWA in November 1935, Lewis formed the "Committee for Industrial Organization" to promote the organization of workers on an industry-wide basis. Key allies were Philip Murray (the UMWA man Lewis picked to head the steel union); Sidney Hillman, president of the Amalgamated Clothing Workers of America (ACWA); and David Dubinsky of the International Ladies' Garment Workers' Union (ILGWU).

The entire CIO group was expelled from the AFL in November 1938 and became the Congress of Industrial Organizations (CIO), with Lewis as the first president. The growth of the CIO was phenomenal in steel, rubber, meat, autos, glass and electrical equipment. In early 1937, his CIO affiliates won collective-bargaining contracts with two of the most powerful anti-union corporations, General Motors and United States Steel. General Motors surrendered as a result of the great Flint Sit-Down Strike, during which Lewis negotiated with company executives, Governor Frank Murphy of Michigan, and President Roosevelt. U.S. Steel conceded without a strike, as Lewis secretly negotiated an agreement with Myron Taylor, chairman of U.S. Steel.

The CIO gained enormous strength and prestige from the victories in automobiles and steel and escalated its organizing drives, targeting industries that the AFL had long claimed, especially meatpacking, textiles, and electrical products. The AFL fought back and gained more members, but the two rivals spent much of their energy fighting each other for members and for power inside local Democratic organizations.

=== Lewis rhetoric ===
Journalist C. L. Sulzberger described Lewis's rhetorical skill in the "Crust of Bread" speech. Operators who opposed a contract were often shamed into agreement by Lewis's accusations. A typical Lewis speech to operators would go, "Gentlemen, I speak to you for the miners' families.... The little children are gathered around a bare table without anything to eat. They are not asking for a $100,000 yacht like yours, Mr...." (here, he would gesture with his cigar toward an operator), "...or for a Rolls-Royce limousine like yours, Mr. ..." (staring at another operator). They are asking only for a slim crust of bread."

=== World War II ===
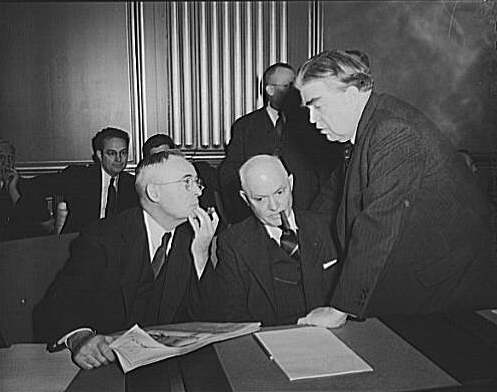
Lewis (right) confers with Thomas Kennedy (left), Secretary-Treasurer of the UMW, and Pery Tetlow (center), president of UMW District 17, at the War Labor Board conference of January 15, 1943, discussing the anthracite coal miners' strike.

In the presidential election of 1940, Lewis rejected Roosevelt and supported Republican Wendell Willkie. The reasons for Lewis' souring on FDR and his New Deal are still contested. Some cite his frustration over FDR's response to the General Motors and "Little Steel" strikes of 1937, or the President's purported rejection of Lewis' proposal to join him on the 1940 Democratic ticket. Others point to power struggles within the CIO as the motivation for Lewis' actions. Lewis drew fierce criticism from most union leaders. Reuben Soderstrom, President of the Illinois State Federation of Labor, ripped his former ally apart in the press, saying he had become "the most imaginative, the most efficient, the most experienced truth-twisting windbag that this nation has yet produced." Lewis failed to persuade his fellow members. On election day, 85% of CIO members supported Roosevelt, thus rejecting Lewis's leadership. He resigned as president of the CIO but kept control of the UMWA.

Prior to the Japanese attack on Pearl Harbor, Lewis was staunchly opposed to American entry into World War II. Initially, he tapped into the anti-militarism that animated the left wing of the CIO. He publicly opposed the prospect of a peacetime draft as "associated with fascism, totalitarianism and the breakdown of civil liberties," claiming in his 1940 Labor Day speech that there was "something sinister about the attempt to force conscription upon our nation, with no revelation of the purposes for which conscription is sought." Lewis' opposition to American intervention continued after the leftist coalition against it had splintered. In August 1941 he joined Herbert Hoover, Alfred Landon, Charles Dawes, and other prominent conservatives in their appeal to Congress to halt President Roosevelt's "step-by-step projection of the United States into undeclared war." This action earned him the enmity of those on the left, including Lee Pressman and Len De Caux.

After the Japanese attack on Pearl Harbor on December 7, 1941, Lewis threw his full support behind FDR's government, stating "When the nation is attacked every American must rally to its support. All other consideration becomes insignificant...With all other citizens I join in the support of our government to the day of its ultimate triumph over Japan and all other enemies."

In October 1942, Lewis withdrew the UMWA from the CIO. Six months later, he substantively violated organized labor's no-strike pledge, spurring President Roosevelt to seize the mines. The strike damaged the public's perception of organized labor generally and Lewis specifically; the Gallup poll of June 1943 showed 87% disapproval of Lewis. Some have asserted that Lewis' actions produced shortages which crippled wartime production in the defense industry.

=== Postwar ===
Time magazine was hostile to Lewis; a 1946 cover illustration depicted him as a dangerous volcano.

In the postwar years, Lewis continued his militancy; his miners went on strikes or "work stoppages" annually. In 1945 to 1950, he led strikes that President Harry S. Truman denounced as threats to national security. In response, industry, railroads and homeowners rapidly switched from coal to oil.

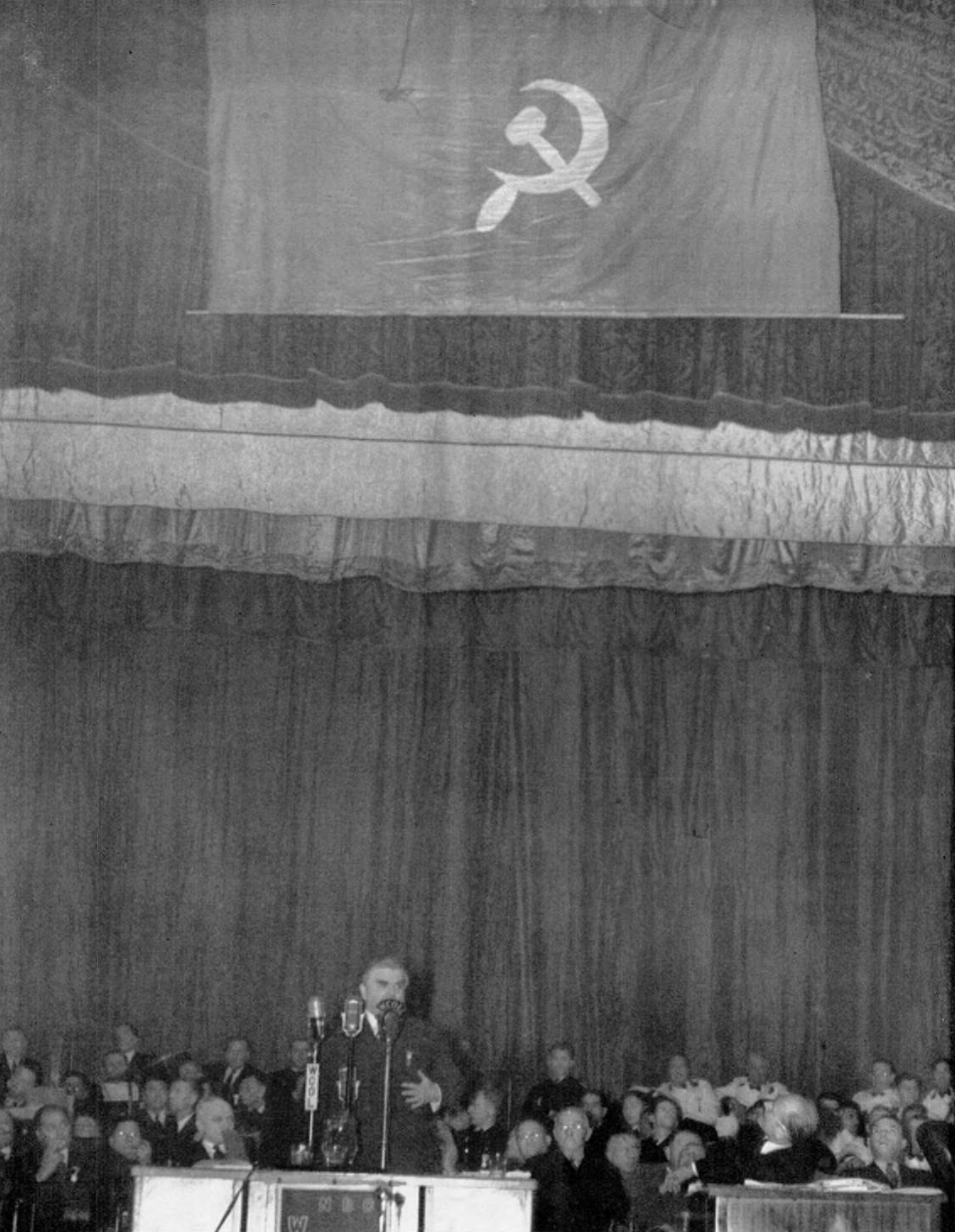
As Lewis addresses a UMW convention in Columbus, Ohio, a red flag with a hammer and sickle is unrolled above him as a practical joke, January 25, 1940

After briefly affiliating with the AFL, Lewis broke with them again over signing non-Communist oaths required by the 1947 Taft–Hartley Act, making the UMW independent. Lewis, never a Communist, still refused on principle to allow any of his officials to take the non-Communist oath required by the Taft–Hartley Act; the UMW was therefore denied legal rights protected by the National Labor Relations Board. He denounced Taft-Hartley as authorizing "government by injunction" and refused to follow its provisions, saying he would not be dictated to. This opposition to labor injunctions meant that Lewis supported attempts to weaken the Civil Rights Act of 1957 by denying the powers of injunctions for voting access cases, which also meant that the ability of judges to lay union injunctions was limited.

Lewis secured a welfare fund financed entirely by the coal companies but administered by the union. In May 1950, he signed a new contract with the coal operators, ending nine months of regional strikes and opening an era of peaceful negotiations that brought wage increases and new medical benefits, including regional hospitals in the hills.

=== 1950s ===
In the 1950s, Lewis won periodic wage and benefit increases for miners and led the campaign for the first Federal Mine Safety Act in 1952. Lewis tried to impose some order on a declining industry through collective bargaining, and maintaining standards for his members by insisting that small operators agree to contract terms that effectively put many of them out of business. Mechanization nonetheless eliminated many of the jobs in his industry, while scattered non-union operations persisted.

Lewis continued to be as autocratic within the UMWA, padding the union payrolls with his friends and family, ignoring or suppressing demands for a rank-and-file voice in union affairs. Finally in 1959 the passage of the Landrum–Griffin Act forced reform. It ended the practice where the UMWA had kept a number of its districts in trusteeship for decades, meaning that Lewis appointed union officers who otherwise would have been elected by the membership.

Lewis retired in early 1960. The highly paid membership slipped below 190,000 because of mechanization, strip mining, and competition from oil. He was succeeded as president by Thomas Kennedy, who served briefly until his death in 1963. He was succeeded by Lewis's anointed successor, W. A. Boyle, known as Tony, a miner from Montana. He was considered just as dictatorial as Lewis, but without any of the longtime leader's skills or vision.

== Retirement and final years ==
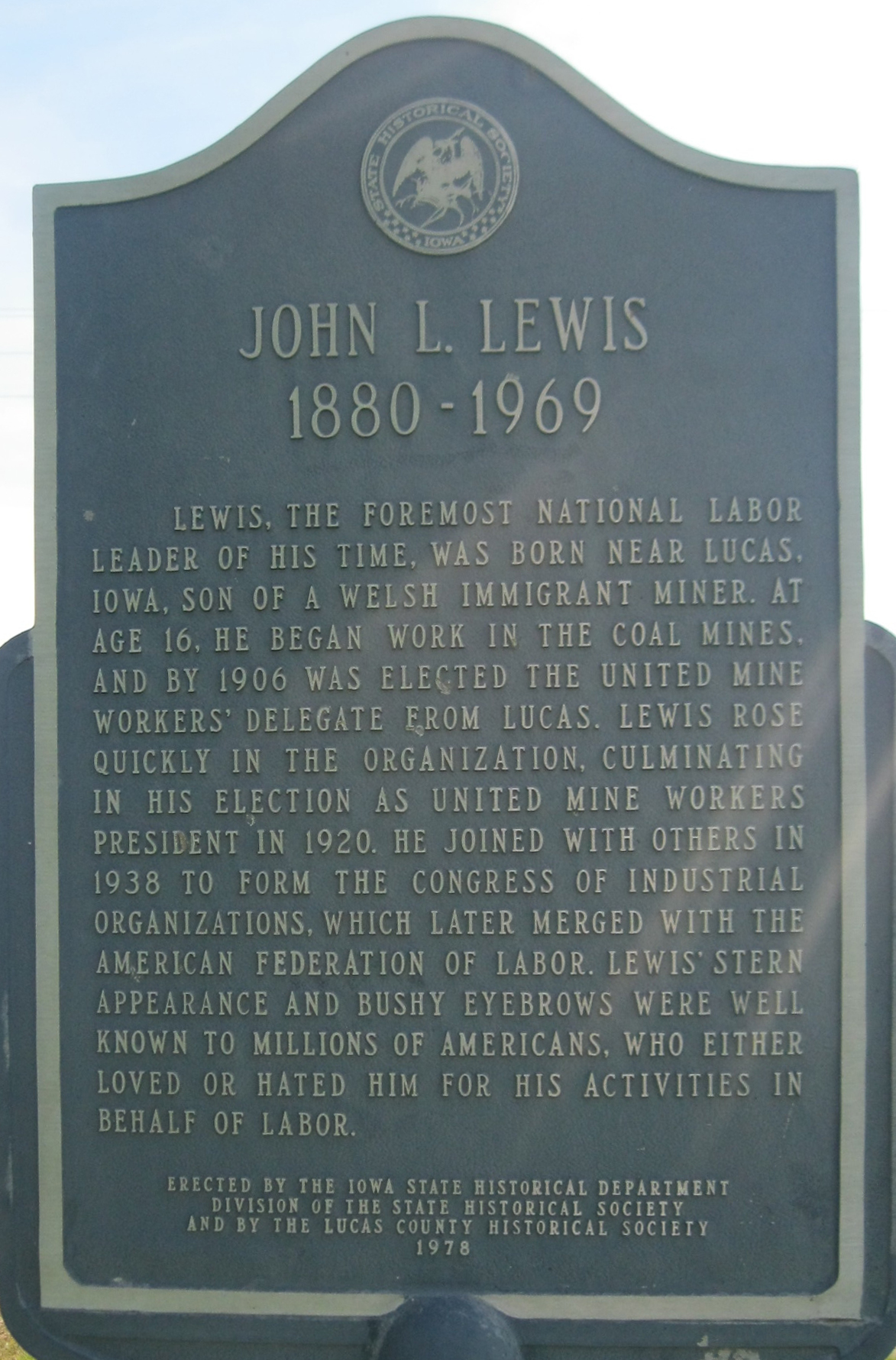
John L. Lewis, United Mine Workers President plaque located in Lucas, Iowa

On September 14, 1964, four years after his retirement from the UMWA, Lewis was awarded the Presidential Medal of Freedom by President Lyndon B. Johnson, his citation reading:

"[An] eloquent spokesman of labor, [Lewis] has given voice to the aspirations of the industrial workers of the country and led the cause of free trade unions within a healthy system of free enterprise."

In 1965, Lewis received the first Eugene V. Debs Award for his service to Industrial Unionism.

Lewis retired to his family home, the Lee–Fendall House in Alexandria, Virginia, where he had lived since 1937. He lived there until his death on June 11, 1969. His passing elicited many kind words and fond remembrances, even from former rivals. "He was my personal friend," wrote Reuben Soderstrom, the President of the Illinois AFL-CIO, who had once lambasted Lewis as an "imaginative windbag," upon news of his death. Lewis, he said, would forever be remembered for "making almost a half million poorly paid and poorly protected coal miners the best paid and best protected miners in all the world." He is buried in Oak Ridge Cemetery, Springfield, Illinois.

== References in popular culture ==
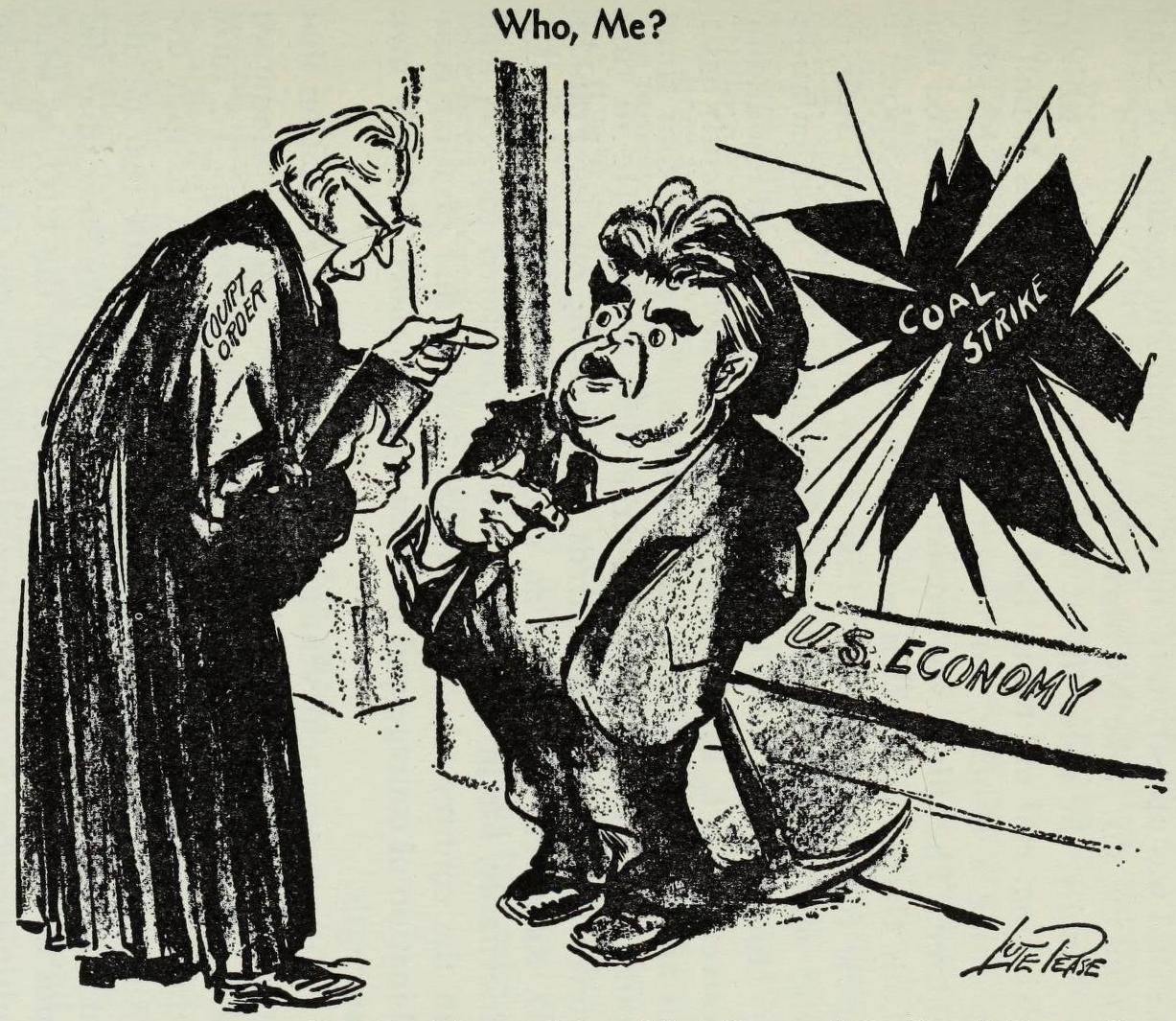
Lewis was a popular target of caricature, as in this 1948 cartoon by Lute Pease that won the Pulitzer Prize for Editorial Cartooning.

The figure of Lewis dominates the center panel of Ben Shahn's Jersey Homesteads mural, completed in 1938. A quotation from his address at the closing session of the October 1937 CIO conference in Atlantic City appears on a sign beside him.

- In the 1938 motion picture Holiday, the character of Linda Seton played by Katharine Hepburn describes how she tried to help some strikers in Jersey. "I never could decide whether I wanted to be Joan of Arc, Florence Nightingale or John L. Lewis."
- In an episode of the Jack Benny radio program, a friend brings a baby over to Benny's house. When the infant breaks a jar of home-made chili, Benny demands fifteen cents as compensation. When his friend protests by saying that he shouldn't have to pay because the baby is a minor, Benny retorts: "I don't care if he's John L. Lewis!" causing the audience to roar with laughter at the minor/miner play on words.
- In another episode of the Jack Benny Radio Program, from 21 January 1945, Mary complains that the hotel is so far underground that they are mining coal in the lobby, and the bellhops have lamps on their helmets. Jack explains it by saying that the desk clerk's name is John L. Lewis.
- In the "Bilko's Secret Mission" episode of The Phil Silvers Show, Sgt. Bilko has a coal miner dig a tunnel out of an army base. The coal miner character mentions John L. Lewis.
- The seventh verse of the song "'31 Depression Blues," recorded by the New Lost City Ramblers and sung by Mike Seeger, includes the line "And the public said 'John L, it can never be done,' / But somehow he got the miners' battle won."
- In the second expansion Wrath of the Lich King, from the popular MMORPG World of Warcraft, there is an NPC that teaches mining named after Jonathan Lewis.
- In John McCutcheon's song "Ghosts of the Good Old Days," he refers to a common Appalachian practice: "Hung three pictures above the old sofa; it was Jesus, FDR, and John L./So we knew how to pray, we knew how to vote, and we knew how to really give 'em hell."
- In Leonard Wibberley's 1956 comic novel McGillicuddy McGotham, a leprechaun diplomat imposes magical sanctions on the US, causing its citizens to go without indoor heat. The phenomenon is mistakenly attributed to a miners' strike led by John L. Lewis.
- In the January 29, 1950 episode of the radio show Our Miss Brooks, Miss Brooks (played by Eve Arden), when speaking to a student who is leading a rebellion against school on Saturday, asks, "Are you sure you have the eyebrows?" (Lewis had very bushy eyebrows.)
- John L. Lewis is mentioned in the 1939 Broadway play The Man Who Came to Dinner, written by George S. Kaufman and Moss Hart. The daughter of the main character and dinner host is in love with a labor organizer. Her father, the host, thinks that the labor organizer was sent by Lewis himself.
- The text of the middle section of the oratorio Anthracite Fields is taken from a Lewis speech.
- In the second episode of the fictional television miniseries The Plot Against America (2020), based on the novel of the same name written by Philip Roth, John L. Lewis is portrayed making a speech against going to war at a rally in support of Charles Lindbergh's 1940 candidacy for US president.
- In his song "Charlie Lindbergh," Woody Guthrie attacks John Lewis, stating: "Mister John L. Lewis would sit and straddle the fence, His daughter signed with Lindbergh, and we ain't seen her since"

== See also ==
- Labor history of the United States
- New Deal Coalition
- UMWA predecessors:
  - Michael Ratchford
  - John Mitchell (United Mine Workers)
  - Thomas Lewis
  - John Phillip White

== Bibliography ==
- Alinsky, Saul. John L. Lewis: An Unauthorized Biography. (1949)
- Baratz, Morton S. The Union and the Coal Industry (Yale University Press, 1955)
- Bernstein, Irving. The Lean Years: a History of the American Worker 1920-1933 (1966), best coverage of the era
- Bernstein, Irving. Turbulent Years: A History of the American Worker, 1933-1941 (1970), thorough coverage of the era
- Bernstein, Irving. "John L. Lewis and the Voting Behavior of the CIO." Public Opinion Quarterly 5.2 (1941): 233–249.
- Cantril, Hadley and Strunk, Mildred, eds. Public Opinion, 1935-1946. (1951) summarizes all published polls on Lewis
- Clapp, Thomas C. "The Bituminous Coal Strike of 1943." PhD dissertation U. of Toledo 1974. 278 pp. DAI 1974 35(6): 3626-3627-A., not online
- Dublin, Thomas and Walter Licht. The Face of Decline: The Pennsylvania Anthracite Region in the Twentieth Century (2005) excerpt and text search
- Dubofsky, Melvyn, and Warren Van Tine. John L. Lewis: A Biography (1977), the standard scholarly biography excerpt and text search of abridged 1986 edition ISBN 0-8129-0673-X.
- Dubofsky, Melvyn, and Warren Van Tine. "John L. Lewis " in Dubofsky and Van Tine, eds. Labor Leaders in America (1987) pp 185–206 online
- Fishback, Price V. Soft Coal, Hard Choices: The Economic Welfare of Bituminous Coal Miners, 1890-1930 (1992)
- Galenson; Walter. The CIO Challenge to the AFL: A History of the American Labor Movement, 1935–1941, (1960)
- Hardman, J. B. S. "John L Lewis, labor leader and man: An interpretation." Labor History 2.1 (1961): 3-29.
- Hinrichs, A. F. The United Mine Workers of America, and the Non-Union Coal Fields (1923)
- Hutchinson, John. "John L. Lewis: To the presidency of the UMWA." Labor History 19.2 (1978): 185–203.
- Laslett, John H.M. ed. The United Mine Workers: A Model of Industrial Solidarity? 1996.
- Lynch, Edward A., and David J. McDonald. Coal and Unionism: A History of the American Coal Miners' Unions (1939)
- Martin, Steven Ernest. "The rhetorical leadership of John L. Lewis" (PhD dissertation, Pennsylvania State University; ProQuest Dissertations Publishing, 2006. 3229325).
- Monroe, Douglas Keith. "A Decade of Turmoil: John L. Lewis and the Anthracite Miners 1926-1936." (PhD dissertation, Georgetown University; ProQuest Dissertations Publishing, 1977. 7722848).
- Ross, Hugh. "John L. Lewis and the Election of 1940." Labor History 17.2 (1976): 160–189.
- Rothman, Richard M. "On the speaking of John L. Lewis." Communication Studies 14.3 (1963): 177–185.
  - Rothman, Richard M. "The Public Speaking of John L. Lewis" (PhD dissertation, Purdue University; ProQuest Dissertations Publishing, 1957. 0024399).
- Seltzer, Curtis. Fire in the Hole: Miners and Managers in the American Coal Industry University Press of Kentucky, 1985, conflict in the coal industry to the 1980s.
- Singer, Alan Jay. "`Which Side Are You On?': Ideological Conflict in the United Mine Workers of America, 1919-1928." PhD dissertation Rutgers U., New Brunswick 1982. 304 pp. DAI 1982 43(4): 1268-A. DA8221709 Fulltext: [ProQuest Dissertations & Theses]
- Sperry, J. R. "Rebellion Within the Ranks: Pennsylvania Anthracite, John L. Lewis, and the Coal Strikes of 1943." Pennsylvania History (1973): 293–312. online
- Weschler, James A. Labor Baron: A Portrait of John L. Lewis (1944) online 295pp; by journalist on the left
- Zieger, Robert H. "Lewis, John L." American National Biography Online Feb. 2000
- Zieger, Robert H. John L. Lewis: Labor Leader (1988), 220pp short biography by scholar
- Zieger, Robert H. The CIO 1935-1955. (1995).

=== Primary sources ===
- "LABOR: Horatius & the Great Ham' Time Dec. 16, 1946
- Political Cartoons about John Lewis 1940-1941 Sykes Editorial Cartoon Collection, VCU Libraries

Trade union offices
Preceded by Frank Hayes	President of the United Mine Workers of America; 1919–1960	Succeeded by Thomas Kennedy
New office	President of the Congress of Industrial Organizations; 1936–1940	Succeeded by Philip Murray
Awards and achievements
Preceded by Franklin D. Roosevelt	Cover of Time; 4 June 1923	Succeeded by Herbert L. Pratt
