= John Mitchell (labor leader) =

American labor leader (1870–1919)

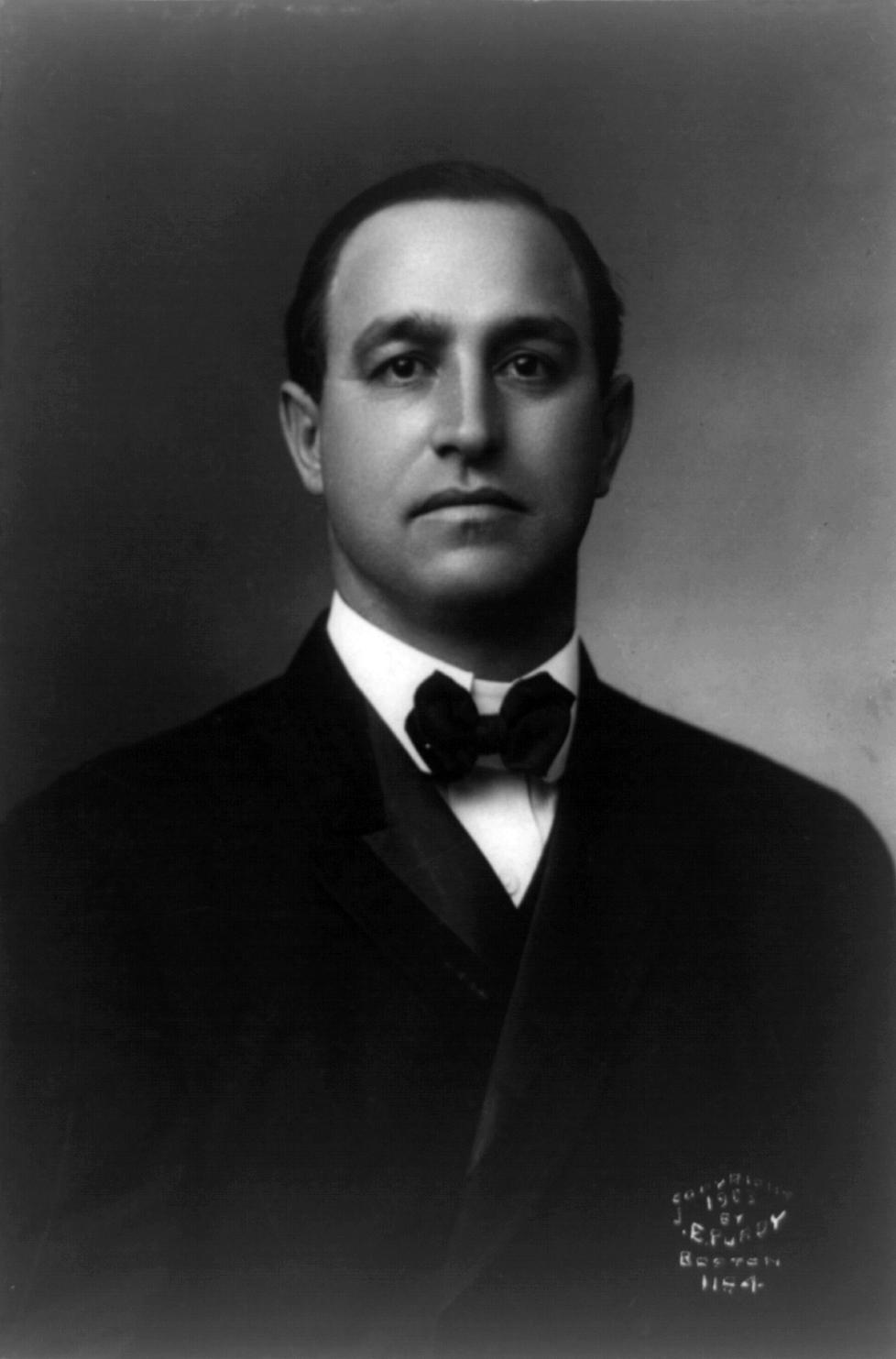

5th President of the United Mine Workers
- In office 1898–1907
- Preceded by: Michael Ratchford
- Succeeded by: Thomas Lewis

Personal details
- Born: February 4, 1870 Braidwood, Illinois, U.S.
- Died: September 9, 1919 (aged 49) New York City, U.S.
- Occupation: Labor leader, civil servant
- Known for: President, United Mine Workers of America

John Mitchell (February 4, 1870 – September 9, 1919) was an American labor leader who served as the president of the United Mine Workers of America from 1898 to 1908.

== Background ==
John Mitchell was born in 1870 in Braidwood, Illinois, a second generation Irish immigrant. He became an orphan when he was only six years old, and began working at that age to support his family.

== Career ==
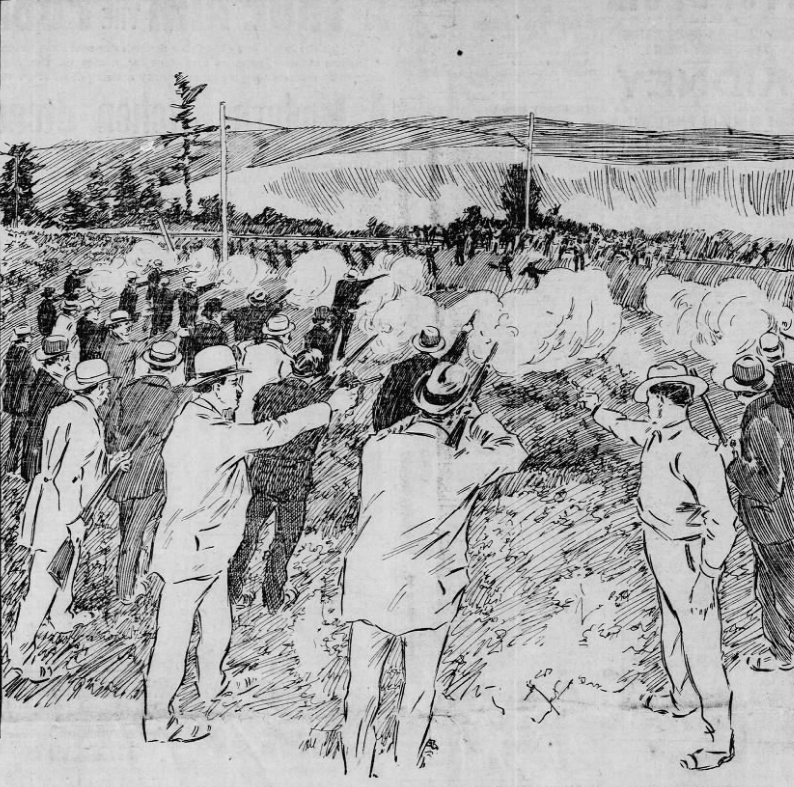
Retreating striking miners being shot in their backs by deputized posse, September 10, 1897, during the Lattimer Massacre, just before Mitchell became UMWA president

Mitchell worked in the coal mines his whole life. Having started work at age six, by age fifteen he joined the Knights of Labor in 1885 and was a founding member of the United Mine Workers of America in 1890. He was elected District 12 secretary-treasurer in 1895. He was made an international union organizer in 1897 and worked alongside Mary Harris "Mother" Jones before being elected an international vice president the same year. Mother Jones later became disillusioned with him. According to her autobiography, "He had tasted power, and this finally destroyed him."

Just before Mitchell became president, the Lattimer Massacre had seen 19 miners killed by police and 58 miners died in the Twin Shaft Disaster one year earlier. But this was also a period of growth for the union: the number of members grew almost tenfold, from 34,000 to 300,000, during Mitchell's term. Mitchell engaged in contentious negotiations with mining companies, including one in which President Theodore Roosevelt had to intervene, resulting in an eight-hour workday and a minimum wage.

In September 1898, Mitchell became acting president of UMWA after president Michael Ratchford resigned to become a member of the United States Industrial Commission. He won election outright in 1899. He helped organize the National Civic Federation in 1900. He served as fourth vice president of the American Federation of Labor (AFL) from 1898 to 1900, and as second vice president from 1899 to 1913 (although he had lost the UMWA presidency in 1908).

Along with AFL Samuel Gompers and AFL secretary-treasurer Frank Morrison, he was sentenced to prison for violating a court injunction during a strike at the Buck Stove and Range Co. in St. Louis, Missouri. In a landmark case, the United States Supreme Court overturned the contempt citation in Gompers v. Buck's Stove and Range Co., finding that the court of appeals had erred in allowing the company to bring the complaint of contempt, rather than the district court itself. One of Mitchell's earliest challenges in the UMWA was to help incorporate new workers from various ethnicities into the union. There were numerous language barriers, as well as cultural biases and outright prejudice to be overcome. His success in this area helped him become vice-president in 1897, and president one year later, in 1898.

When his successor, Thomas Lewis, won approval of a resolution forcing UMWA members to resign from the National Civic Federation, Mitchell left the union. He continued his association with the federation for many years, as well as serving on a number of state and federal commissions.

== Death ==
John Mitchell died age 49 on September 9, 1919, from pneumonia in New York City and was buried in Cathedral Cemetery in Scranton.

A portion of his ashes, along with an engraved urn, were donated to the United Mine Workers of America, International Office. They have this on display at their headquarters in Triangle, Virginia.

== Legacy ==
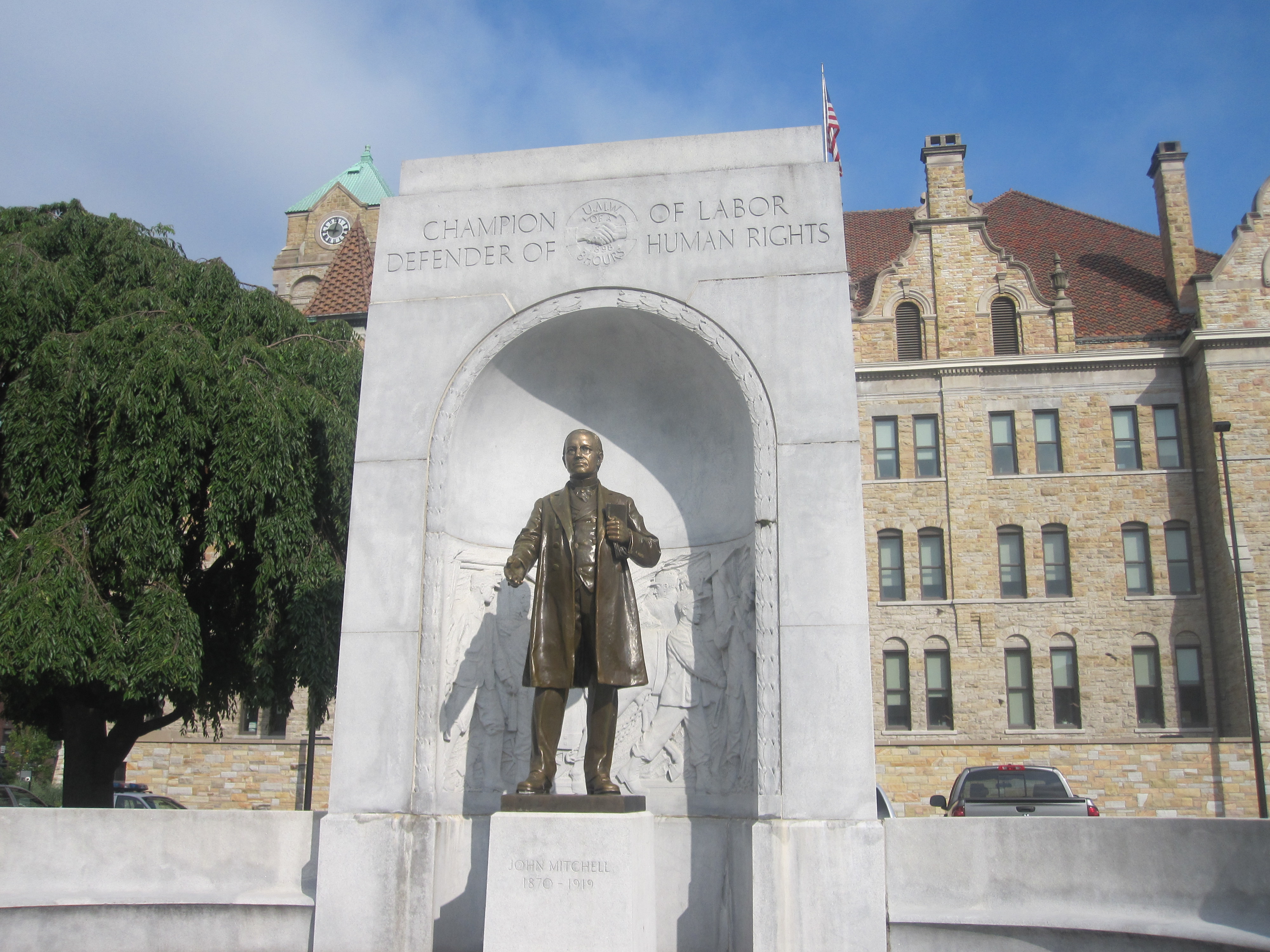
"Champion of Labor, Defender of Human Rights": John Mitchell statue on back side of Lackawanna County Courthouse in Scranton, Pennsylvania

A statue of Mitchell stands on the grounds of the Lackawanna County Courthouse, Scranton, Pennsylvania, the site of the Coal Strike of 1902 negotiations in which President Roosevelt participated. Because of the significance of these negotiations, the statue and the Courthouse were added to the National Register of Historic Places in 1997.

== Works ==
- The Workingman's Conception of Industrial Liberty (1910)

== See also ==
- Michael Ratchford
- Thomas Lewis
- John Phillip White
- John L. Lewis

== Bibliography ==
- Gowaskie, Joseph M. (1976). "From Conflict to Cooperation: John Mitchell and Bituminous Coal Operators, 1898‐1908". The Historian. 38 (4): 669–688. doi:10.1111/j.1540-6563.1976.tb00056.x.
- Gowaskie, Joe (1985). "John Mitchell and the Anthracite Mine Workers: Leadership Conservatism and Rank‐and‐File Militancy". Labor History. 27 (1): 54–83. doi:10.1080/00236568508584826.
- Phelan, Craig (1994). Divided Loyalties: The Public and Private Life of Labor Leader John Mitchell. Albany, N.Y.: State University of New York Press. ISBN 0-7914-2087-6.

Trade union offices
Preceded by John Kane	Vice-President of the United Mine Workers of America; 1898	Succeeded by Thomas W. Davis
Preceded by Michael Ratchford	President of the United Mine Workers of America; 1898–1907	Succeeded by Thomas Lewis
Preceded by Mahlon Morris Garland	Fourth Vice-President of the American Federation of Labor; 1898–1900	Succeeded by Max Morris
Preceded by James Duncan	Second Vice-President of the American Federation of Labor; 1900–1913	Succeeded by James O'Connell
