= Phil Penna =

American labor leader

Philip Henry Penna

3rd President of the United Mine Workers
- In office 1895–1896
- Preceded by: John McBride
- Succeeded by: Michael Ratchford

Personal details
- Born: November 1857 Rose, Cornwall, England
- Died: 5 January 1939 (aged 81) Terre Haute, Vigo Co, Indiana
- Occupation: Miner; Labor leader
- Known for: President, United Mine Workers of America

Phil Penna (November 1857 – 5 January 1939) was an American labor leader, and president of the United Mine Workers of America (UMWA) from 1895 to 1896.

John McBride, president of UMWA, had won election as president of the American Federation of Labor in 1895, unseating Samuel Gompers. McBride resigned to take the position, and Penna was elected his successor.

The continuing Long Depression severely depressed employment, wages and benefits for coal miners during his tenure. McBride had led the Bituminous Coal Miners' Strike—an unsuccessful eight-week national coal miners' strike—the year before Penna's presidency, which encouraged hundreds of non-union mines to flood the market for coal.

During Penna's presidency, membership in the Mine Workers fell from 13,000 to 9,700, and the union's treasury dropped from $2,600 to $600. Penna suspended union operations, stopped publishing the union newsletter and ceased paying per capita dues to the AFL. Penna did not run for re-election. His successor was Michael Ratchford.

Trade union offices
Preceded by William H. Turner	Vice-President of the United Mine Workers of America; 1891–1895	Succeeded by Cameron Miller
Preceded by John McBride	President of the United Mine Workers of America; 1895 - 1896	Succeeded by Michael Ratchford
