= Thomas Lewis (unionist) =

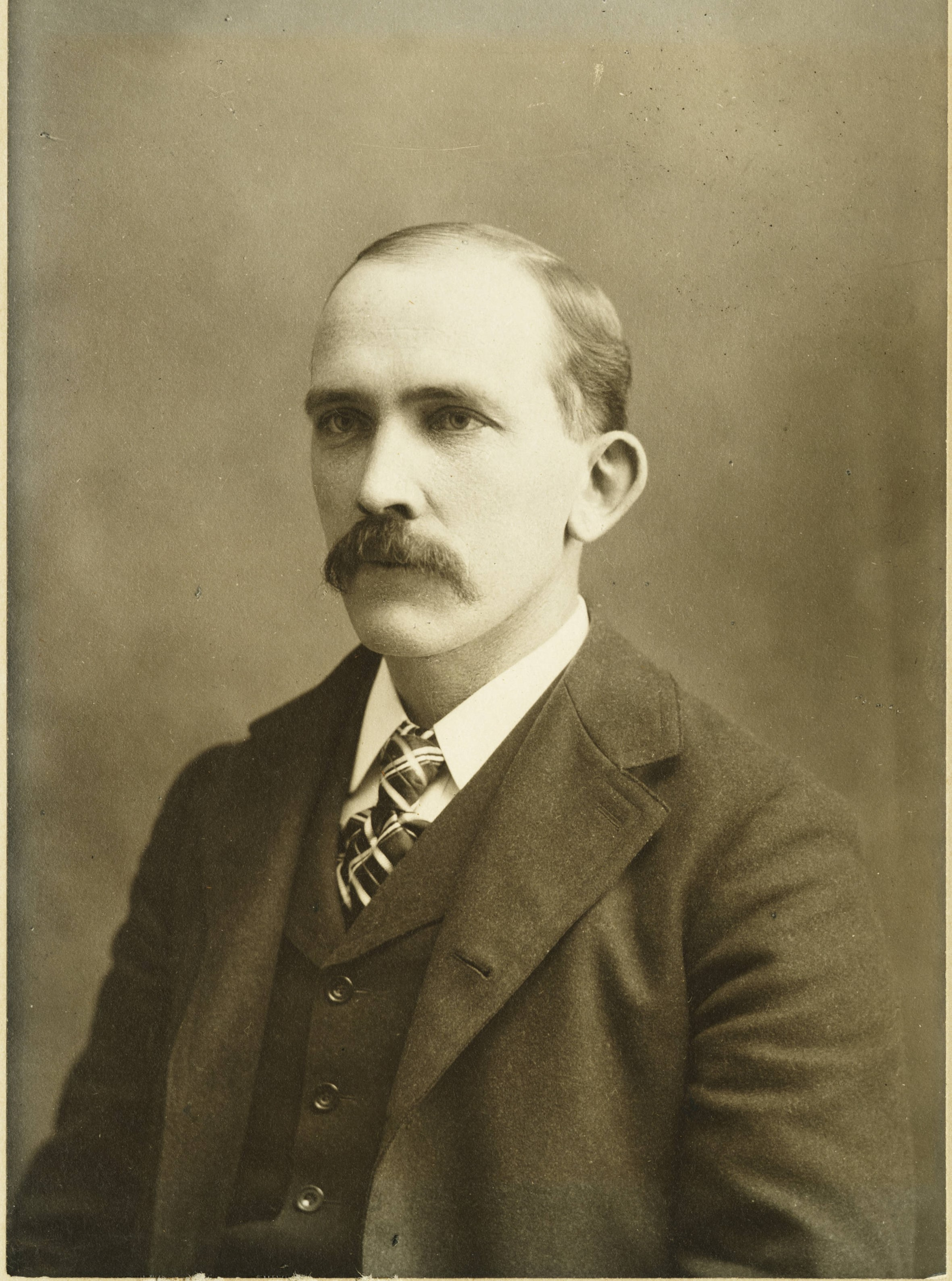

6th President of the United Mine Workers
- In office 1908–1910
- Preceded by: John Mitchell
- Succeeded by: John P. White

Personal details
- Born: 1866 Locust Gap, Pennsylvania, U.S.
- Died: May 31, 1939 (age 73) Charleston, West Virginia, U.S.
- Occupation: Miner; Labor leader; Business executive
- Known for: President, United Mine Workers of America

Thomas L. Lewis (1866 – May 1, 1939) was a miner and president of the United Mine Workers of America (UMWA) from 1907 to 1911.

== Biography ==
Born in Locust Gap, Pennsylvania in 1866, Lewis worked in the mines as a boy. He later helped found the United Mine Workers in 1890.

He first ran for the presidency of UMWA in 1898 against John Mitchell, but withdrew before a vote could be taken. He became vice president of District 6 under William Green. When Mitchell fell ill in 1907 and was unable to control the UMWA convention, Lewis led an attack on him and won the presidency. He fought off challengers in 1908, 1909 and even Green himself in 1910, although he was forced to rig elections in the latter two campaigns.

Although Lewis stacked the organizing staff of the Mine Workers with his political supporters and turned the union's journal into a propaganda organ supporting his presidency, he did not retain leadership of the union after he signed regional wage agreements in 1909 and 1910 without the consent of the affected district presidents. He was defeated in 1910 by John P. White. He ran again for the presidency of the union in 1912, but lost.

After leaving the union, he became an anti-labor consultant for coal operators in West Virginia, published a coal operators' trade journal (the Coal Mining Review), and helped found the National Coal Association. According to Winthrop Lane, Lewis also served as Secretary of the New River Coal Operator's Association.

== Death ==
Lewis died in Charleston, West Virginia on May 1, 1939.

== See also ==
- Michael Ratchford
- John Mitchell (United Mine Workers)
- John Phillip White
- John L. Lewis

Trade union offices
Preceded by Thomas W. Davis	Vice-President of the United Mine Workers of America; 1900–1908	Succeeded by John P. White
Preceded by John Mitchell	President of the United Mine Workers of America; 1908 – 1910	Succeeded by John P. White
