= Coal Valley Township, Rock Island County, Illinois =

Coordinates: 41°26′00″N 90°28′32″W

Coal Valley Township
- Township
- Flag

- Location in Rock Island County

- Rock Island County's location in Illinois
- Country: United States
- State: Illinois
- County: Rock Island
- Established: November 4, 1856

Area
  - Total: 12.06 sq mi (31.2 km^{2})
  - Land: 11.78 sq mi (30.5 km^{2})
  - Water: 0.28 sq mi (0.73 km^{2}) 2.32%

Population (2010)
  - Estimate (2016): 4,399
  - Density: 374.3/sq mi (144.5/km^{2})
- Time zone: UTC-6 (CST)
  - Summer (DST): UTC-5 (CDT)
- FIPS code: 17-161-15248

Coal Valley Township is located in Rock Island County, Illinois. As of the 2010 census, its population was 4,408 and it contained 1,910 housing units.

== History ==
Coal Valley Township was named for coal mines in the vicinity.

== Geography ==
According to the 2010 census, the township has a total area of 12.06 square miles (31.2 km^{2}), of which 11.78 square miles (30.5 km^{2}) (or 97.68%) is land and 0.28 square miles (0.73 km^{2}) (or 2.32%) is water.

Quad City International Airport is partially in Coal Valley Township.

== Demographics ==
Historical population
Census	Pop.	Note	%±
2016 (est.)	4,399
U.S. Decennial Census
