= Frank Hayes (unionist) =

American trade unionist and politician

Frank J. Hayes
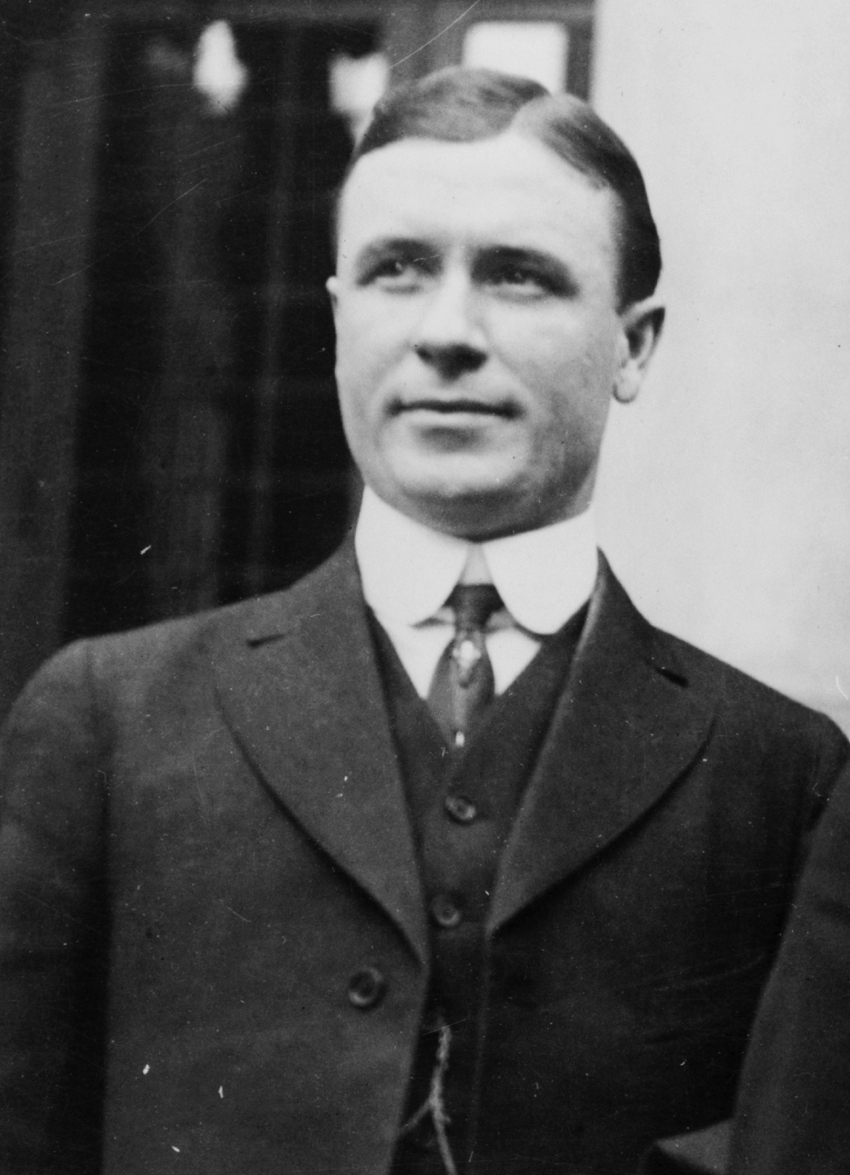
- Hayes in 1911

27th Lieutenant Governor of Colorado
- In office January 12, 1937 – January 10, 1939
- Governor: Teller Ammons
- Preceded by: Ray Herbert Talbot
- Succeeded by: John Charles Vivian

8th President of the United Mine Workers
- In office October 26, 1917 – February 7, 1920 (Note: de facto since April 1919)
- Preceded by: John P. White
- Succeeded by: John L. Lewis

Vice President of the United Mine Workers
- In office January 21, 1910 – October 26, 1917
- Preceded by: John P. White
- Succeeded by: John L. Lewis

Personal details
- Born: May 4, 1882 What Cheer, Iowa, U.S.
- Died: June 10, 1948 (aged 66) Denver, Colorado, U.S.
- Party: Socialist (before 1926); Democratic (after 1926)
- Occupation: Miner, labor leader

Frank J. Hayes (May 4, 1882 – June 10, 1948) was an American miner and labor leader who served as president of the United Mine Workers of America (UMWA) from 1917 to 1919. Originally a Socialist, Hayes later joined the Democratic Party and was elected Lieutenant Governor of Colorado in 1936, serving a single two-year term.

== Early life ==
He was born in the coal mining town of What Cheer, Iowa, in 1882, but moved with his family as a boy to Illinois. At the age of 13, he began working in the coal mines. His father was active in the unions.

== UMWA involvement 1904–1919 ==
He joined the United Mine Workers and held a number of local union offices before being elected secretary-treasurer of District 13 in 1904. A socialist, he allied himself with the radical left-wing of the miners' union and agitated for greater militancy and adoption of socialism as the union's only economic and political philosophy.

He was elected an international vice president in 1911. While a vice president, he helped strategize and organize the Paint Creek–Cabin Creek strike of 1912 in West Virginia and the Colorado Coal Strike of 1913–1914 (during which the Ludlow Massacre occurred).

=== Paint Creek-Cabin Creek strike of 1912 ===
The Paint Creek Miners' Union with the help of Hayes, serving as the UMWA International Vice President, declared a strike with eight demands. After the demands were known the Cabin Creek Miners' Union joined the striking miners as well. During the first month of the strike the UMWA organizers kept peace, but subsequently the mine operators hired the Baldwin–Felts Detective Agency to break the strike. After 300 Baldwin-Felts Detectives arrived, the labor organizer Mother Jones also arrived and was subsequently arrested.

The strike lasted from April 18, 1912, through July 1913. After the confrontation, Fred Stanton, a banker, estimated that the strike and ensuing armed conflict cost $100,000,000. The confrontation directly caused perhaps fifty violent deaths, as well as many more deaths caused indirectly by starvation and malnutrition among the striking miners. In the number of casualties, it counts among the worst conflicts in American labor union history.

=== Ludlow Massacre ===
The Ludlow Massacre was an attack by the Colorado National Guard and Colorado Fuel and Iron Company guards on a tent colony of 1,200 coal miners and their families at Ludlow, Colorado, on April 20, 1914. About two dozen people, including miners' wives and children, were killed. The chief owner of the mine, John D. Rockefeller Jr., was widely criticized for the incident.

The massacre, the seminal event in the Colorado Coal Wars, resulted in the death of 21 people. The deaths occurred after a daylong fight between militia and camp guards against striking workers. Ludlow was the deadliest single incident in the southern Colorado Coal Strike, which lasted from September 1913 through December 1914. The strike was organized by the miners against coal mining companies in Colorado. The three largest companies involved were the Rockefeller family-owned Colorado Fuel & Iron Company, the Rocky Mountain Fuel Company, and the Victor-American Fuel Company.

In retaliation for Ludlow, the miners armed themselves and attacked dozens of antiunion establishments over the next ten days, destroying property and engaging in several skirmishes with the Colorado National Guard along a 40-mile front from Trinidad to Walsenburg. The entire strike would cost between 69 and 199 lives. Thomas G. Andrews described it as the "deadliest strike in the history of the United States", commonly referred to as the Colorado Coalfield War.

The Ludlow Massacre was a watershed moment in American labor relations. Historian Howard Zinn described the Ludlow Massacre as "the culminating act of perhaps the most violent struggle between corporate power and laboring men in American history". Congress responded to public outcry by directing the House Committee on Mines and Mining to investigate the incident. Its report, published in 1915, was influential in promoting child labor laws and an eight-hour work day.

The Ludlow site, 18 miles northwest of Trinidad, Colorado, is now a ghost town. The massacre site is owned by the United Mine Workers of America, which erected a granite monument in memory of the miners and their families who died that day. The Ludlow Tent Colony Site was designated a National Historic Landmark on January 16, 2009, and dedicated on June 28, 2009.Modern archeological investigation largely supports the strikers' reports of the event.

==== Hayes invites, but Baldwin–Felts answers ====
Frank J. Hayes, then international vice-president, twice invited the operators to a joint conference, as did the miners assembled in convention at Trinidad on Sep 15, 1913. But the operators had ignored these invitations.

It is significant that of the miners' six or seven demands, only two were not already guaranteed under severe penalty by the laws of Colorado. Much of the source of irritation, then, might have been eliminated if Governor E. M. Ammons' administration had enforced the laws.

Though winter lay ahead, the mining families were nonetheless evicted from company houses. The United Mine Workers of America immediately built tent colonies for them. The largest, having two hundred tents and a population of nearly a thousand people, was located on the barren plains of Ludlow.

When the strike in southern Colorado finally went into effect on September 23, over eleven thousand mine workers, 95 per cent of the total, left the pits. With company operations halted by this mass work stoppage, the "Big Three" corporations—Colorado Fuel and Iron Company, Rocky Mountain Fuel Company, and the Victor American Fuel Company—imported the Baldwin-Felts industrial detectives of West Virginia.

The Baldwin–Felts organization promptly took over the sheriffs' offices in Las Animas and Huerfano counties ... and staffed them with several hundred barrel-house bums and professional gunmen imported from the cities ... The miners meanwhile had armed themselves in self-defense and in a battle had temporarily succeeded in driving the Baldwins into the hills.

Then came the Colorado National Guard, in command of Adjutant General John Chase. Assured by him and Governor Ammons that they would be let alone, the striking miners voluntarily surrendered their arms. On the last day of October 1913, with banners flying, the singing men, women and children marched behind their band down the road to meet the militia ... [3]

===== Account of Frank Hayes speech after the Ludlow Massacre =====
"Frank J. Hayes, International Vice President of the Union, the man who had charge of the Colorado situation, and colleague of Lawson, was then introduced. Mr. Hayes spoke in clear, ringing voice. His splendid diction and his magnetic personality at once won his hearers, and he held their closest attention.

First paying tribute to Lawson as a splendid man, he declared that he came here as the representative of 500,000 organized coal miners to discuss the so-called "Lawson case." He told how he and Lawson and other leaders went to Colorado in 1913, how they sought a hearing with the mine owners but met with refusal, because the operators had determined to eliminate the union. Then he told of how the strike was called, and how the men had hoped to conduct it peacefully, as no strike could be won by violence.

Then Mr. Hayes told how the mine owners imported 700 gun-men to break the strike, of how they started the trouble by shooting into the tent colonies established by the strikers who had been evicted from company houses. He told dramatically of the shooting or murdering of thirty-eight men, women and children, and not one indictment had been brought against the mine owners.

Lawson was indicted for the killing of John Nimo, a mine guard, who was shot down in an open battle between miners and mine guards. Lawson was not within several miles of the scene, but he was indicted because he was in charge of the Ludlow tent colony, and they trumped up a charge that he was responsible for all the acts of the colony.

He declared that Las Animas county was owned body and soul by the corporations. In proof he showed that although in the past 23 years over 1000 miners had been accidentally killed, not one resulted in a damage suit in favor of the miners' families. All the court officials had been in the pay of the corporations. The sheriff picked the jury. There was no jury box, but he drew a venire of 75 men prejudiced against Lawson, and of these the twelve worst were placed on the trial jury. Then he told of how the jury was coerced to bring in the verdict of guilty.

Mr. Hayes concluded his masterly speech by enumerating the demands of the Colorado miners, all of which were based on Colorado laws that were not being lived up to by the mine owners. He severely arraigned Rockefeller, and recited a poem that he had composed, based on Rockefeller's expression, "My Conscience acquits me." He was given thunderous applause."

=== UMWA President 1917–1919 ===
In 1908, while on the UMWA executive council, Hayes unsuccessfully ran for Illinois Secretary of State on the Socialist Party ticket. When UMWA president John P. White resigned in 1917 to take a federal government job, Hayes was elected president to succeed him. Hayes' tenure as UMWA president was not an effective one. He was not a firm leader, and lacked administrative abilities. His health deteriorated quickly during his presidency, probably due to alcoholism. By 1919, he turned most of his duties over to John L. Lewis, who was named the union's acting president. Hayes resigned the office of president in 1920. Although he retained a position and salary as an international field representative, he retired to Colorado.

== Later life and death ==
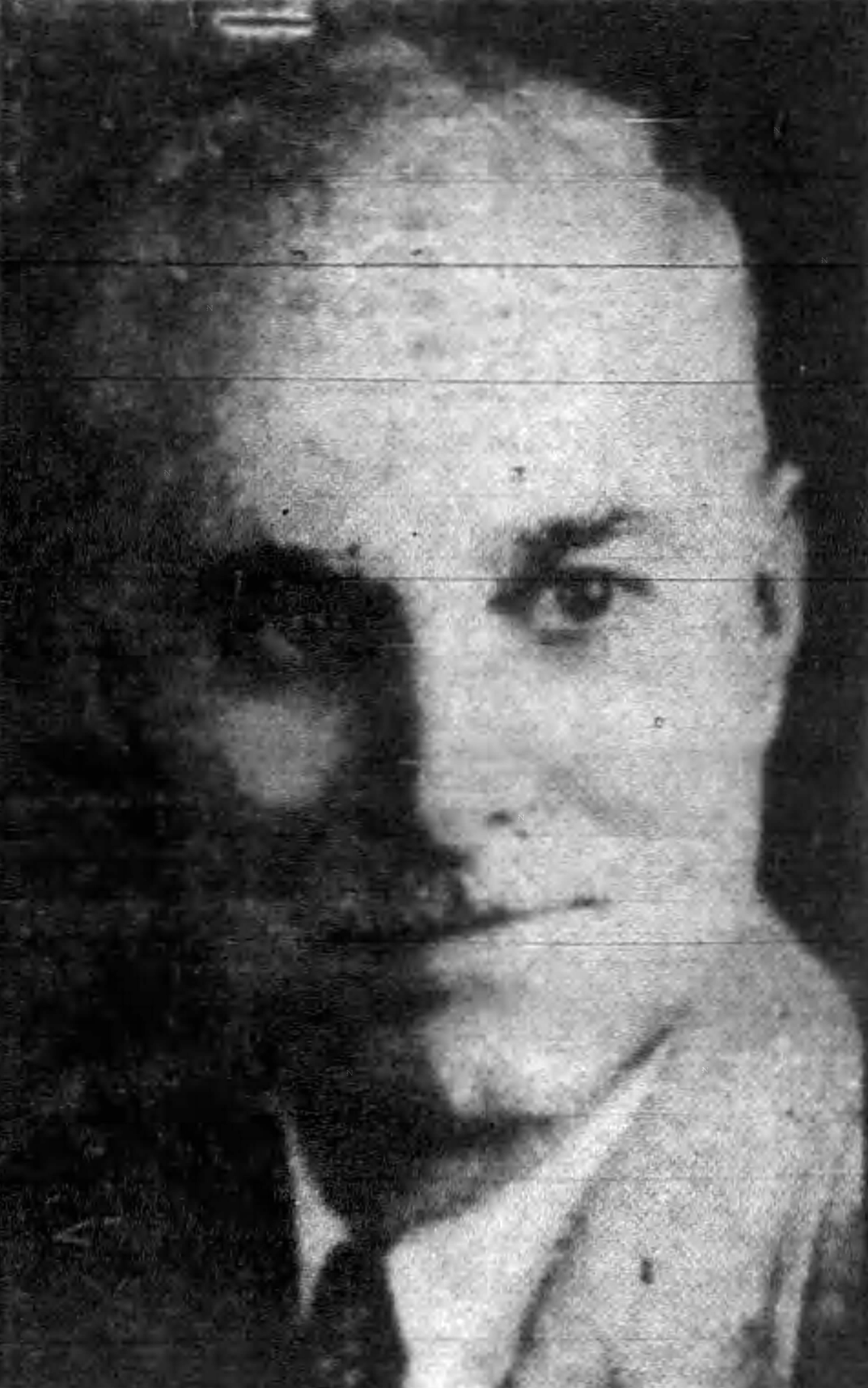
Hayes c. 1938

Some time after vacating his leadership position in the UMWA, Hayes joined the Democratic Party and ran for U.S. Senate in 1926, coming in third place in the Democratic primary with 14% of the vote. A decade later, he was elected Lieutenant Governor of Colorado, serving from 1937 to 1939.

Hayes died in Denver, Colorado, on June 10, 1948, at age 66. Not much has been written about his cause of death but he did suffer from alcoholism during his life.

== Labor songs and poetry ==
During Hayes' retirement to Colorado he wrote labor songs and poetry (much of it concerning the Ludlow Massacre).

=== "We're Coming, Colorado" by Frank J. Hayes ===
Sung to the tune of "The Battle Cry of Freedom"

We will win the fight today, boys,
We'll win the fight today,
Shouting the battle cry of union;
We will rally from the coal mines,
We'll battle to the end,
Shouting the battle cry of union.

Chorus:
The union forever, hurrah, boys, hurrah!
Down with the Baldwins, up with the law;
For we're coming, Colorado, we're coming all the way,
Shouting the battle cry of union.

We have fought them here for years, boys,
We'll fight them in the end,
Shouting the battle cry of union.
We have fought them in the North,
Now we'll fight them in the South,
Shouting the battle cry of union.

We are fighting for our rights, boys,
We are fighting for our homes,
Shouting the battle cry of union;
Men have died to win the struggle;
They've died to set us free,
Shouting the battle cry of union.

— The Women and Children of Ludlow by Frank J. Hayes

(John D. Rockefeller Jr., testifying before the congressional committee, investigating the Colorado strike, when asked if he approved of the use of machine-guns and paid gunmen to break the strike, even though scores of people were murdered, replied: "My conscience acquits me.")

Your conscience acquits you-but how make reply
And speak now of justice, with eyes to the sky,
When there in the ashes their torn bodies lie,
The women and children of Ludlow?
How look on their faces, their blood-matted hair,
Their charred, blackened bodies all swollen and bare,
And the babes on their bosoms thy fiends murdered there,
The women and children of Ludlow?
Your conscience acquits you-but what of the dead!
O! what of the murdered-they asked you for bread;
They begged you for freedom and you gave them lead,
The women and children of Ludlow.
They sought but a chance for their husbands and sons,
A future more kindly for their little ones-
Your conscience acquits you-yet slaughtered with guns
The women and children of Ludlow.
Your conscience acquits you-go look where they died;
Go look where they perished, ay, pleaded and cried-
The mothers, the children, the babes crucified.
The women and children of Ludlow.
And then tell the God you profess to adore,
O! then tell the Master, your hands red with gore,
Your conscience you-though slaughtered the poor,
The women and children of Ludlow.

== Ludlow Massacre Monument activist ==
Frank Hayes sent the following letter about a monument for the Ludlow Massacre to another member of the UMWA leadership upon his retirement. He continued to be a voice for miners throughout the rest of his life. This letter is just one that was featured in the United Mine Workers Journal and the Hellraisers Journal

Dear Sir and Brother:

Just a few lines to advise that we expect to have the Ludlow Monument erected and in place by next Decoration Day, and we propose to hold dedication exercises at Ludlow on that date. In view of this fact, it might be well to postpone the anniversary demonstration until May 30th, at which time we expect to hold a great demonstration at Ludlow, which will be attended by all the members of the International Executive Board. I suggest that you notify your Local Unions as to our intention to hold dedication exercises on May 30th.

With all good wishes, I am,

Fraternally yours,

FRANK J. HAYES, President

It may be stated here that owing to difficulties encountered in transporting material, the original arrangements to have the monument arrive at Ludlow in time to hold dedication services on the day of the anniversary of the Ludlow massacre, could not be carried out. The dedication and memorial exercises will be held on Decoration Day as set forth in the above communication.

All local unions of Dist. No. 15 are advised to make suitable arrangements to be represented at Ludlow on the 30th day of May, when it is expected that the miners of Colorado will foregather in a mighty demonstration to pay tribute to those who died that the United Mine Workers might endure in Colorado.

== Further sources ==
- Downing, Sybil. Fire in the Hole. Niwot, Colo.: University Press of Colorado, 1996. ISBN 0-87081-380-3
- Fink, Gary M., ed. Biographical Dictionary of American Labor. Westport, Ct.: Greenwood Press, 1984. ISBN 0-313-22865-5
- Holbrook, Stewart. The Rocky Mountain Revolution. New York: Henry Holt and Company, 1956.
- McGovern, George S. and Guttridge, Leonard F. The Great Coalfield War. Paperback reissue ed. Niwot, Colo.: University Press of Colorado, 2004. ISBN 0-87081-381-1
- Phelan, Craig. William Green: Biography of a Labor Leader. Albany, N.Y.: State University of New York Press, 1989. ISBN 0-88706-871-5
- Suggs, Jr., George G. Colorado's War on Militant Unionism: James H. Peabody and the Western Federation of Miners. 2nd ed. Norman, Okla.: University of Oklahoma Press, 1991. ISBN 0-8061-2396-6

Trade union offices
Preceded by John P. White	Vice-President of the United Mine Workers of America; 1910–1917	Succeeded by John L. Lewis
Preceded by John P. White	President of the United Mine Workers of America; 1917–1919	Succeeded by John L. Lewis
Political offices
Preceded by Ray Herbert Talbot	Lieutenant Governor of Colorado; 1937–1939	Succeeded by John Charles Vivian
