= John Phillip White =

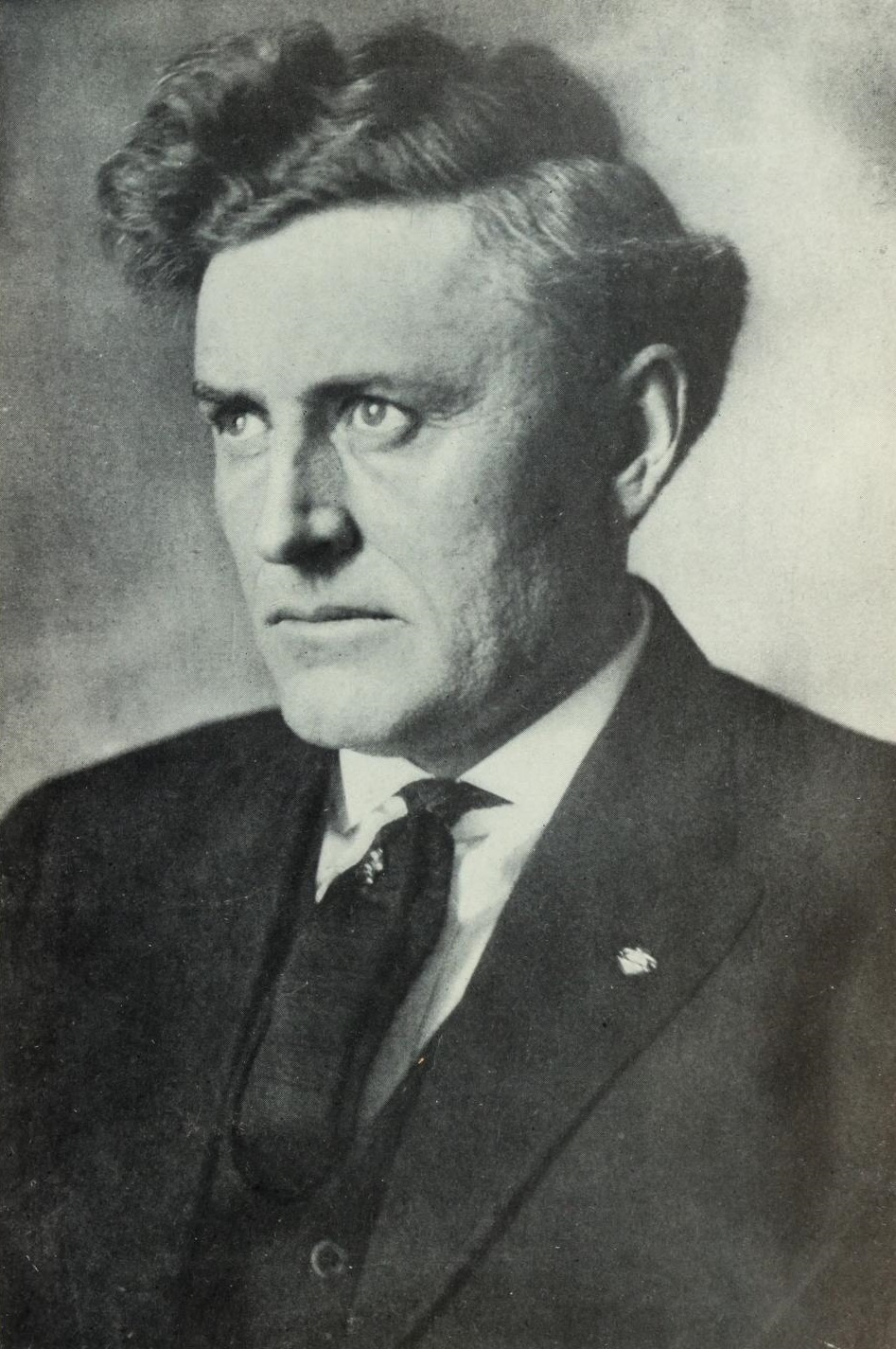

7th President of the United Mine Workers
- In office 1911–1917
- Preceded by: Thomas Lewis
- Succeeded by: Frank Hayes

Personal details
- Born: February 28, 1870 Coal Valley, Illinois
- Died: September 21, 1934 (aged 64) Des Moines, Iowa
- Occupation: Miner; Labor leader; Civil servant
- Known for: President, United Mine Workers of America

John Phillip White (February 28, 1870 – September 21, 1934) was a miner and president of the United Mine Workers of America (UMWA) from 1911 to 1917.

== Biography ==
He was born in Coal Valley, Rock Island County, Illinois in 1870 and went to work in the mines as a teenager before moving with his family to Iowa. He joined the United Mine Workers and was eventually elected District 13 secretary-treasurer in 1899. He became the district president from 1904 to 1907 and again from 1909 to 1912. He was elected an UMWA international vice president in 1909, serving for two years.

He was elected president of UMWA in 1911 after pledging to unite the union's warring factions. It is generally concluded that he was successful. During his presidency, the Colorado Coal Strike of 1913-1914 and Ludlow Massacre occurred.

He is generally considered a progressive UMWA president. He won UMWA approval of the six-hour day, a ban on the employment of anyone under the age of 16, pensions, and workers' compensation. Although he was a political conservative, he forced through an amendment to the UMWA constitution forbidding membership in the National Civic Federation.

White is well known for two actions, which eventually, determined the course of the labor movement in the United States. In 1912, he forced delegates of the UMWA convention to approve a resolution asking the American Federation of Labor to endorse industrial unionism. He also appointed John L. Lewis to be UMWA's chief statistician, a position which would allow Lewis to launch his own successful, historic run for the union presidency.

He resigned from UMWA in 1917 to serve as a consultant to the National Fuel Commission during World War I. After the war, he worked as a field representative for UMWA. He died in Des Moines, Iowa, in 1934.

Trade union offices
Preceded by Thomas Lewis	Vice-President of the United Mine Workers of America; 1908–1910	Succeeded by Frank Hayes
Preceded by Thomas Lewis	President of the United Mine Workers of America; 1911-1917	Succeeded by Frank Hayes
Preceded by Charles Moyer	President of the Mining Department; 1912–1914	Succeeded by James Lord
Preceded by John R. Alpine	Seventh Vice-President of the American Federation of Labor; 1913–1914	Succeeded by Frank Duffy
