= Mike Trbovich =

Mike Trbovich (November 19, 1920 – June 24, 1989) was a miner and labor union activist in the United Mine Workers of America, AFL-CIO, in the 1960s and 1970s. He was elected as vice president of UMWA in 1972, serving under Arnold Miller until 1977.

Of Eastern European descent, Trbovich had a high school education, and worked as a coal shuttle operator in Pennsylvania for much of his life. An active member of the United Mine Workers of America (UMWA), he rose to prominence in District 5 (which covered Pennsylvania) under reformer Joseph "Jock" Yablonski in the 1960s. He was among the organizers of Miners for Democracy (MFD), founded in 1970 after the assassination of Yablonski in December 1969.

== Yablonski electoral challenge ==
In December 1969 Joseph "Jock" Yablonski challenged autocratic UMWA president W. A. Boyle for the presidency of the union, after pushing for reform for years. Trbovich was one of Yablonski's most ardent supporters, and managed his campaign. In the December 9 election, widely seen as fraudulent, Boyle beat Yablonski by a margin of nearly two-to-one. While he hung on to power, it was the first time since 1920 that incumbents had less than 80 percent of the vote, or that an insurgent had campaigned for the office.

Yablonski conceded the election, but on December 18 asked the United States Department of Labor (DOL) to investigate the election for fraud. In addition, he filed five civil lawsuits against the UMWA, on specific charges related to actions against him and failure to run a fair election.

On December 31, three gunmen, ordered through other levels by Boyle and paid with union funds embezzled by Boyle, fatally shot Yablonski, his wife, Margaret, and their 25-year-old daughter, Charlotte, as they slept at their home in Clarksville, Pennsylvania.

A few hours after Yablonski's funeral, Trbovich, Yablonski's sons (Kenneth and Joseph "Chip" Yablonski, both labor attorneys), and several other miners who had supported Yablonski, met in the basement of the church were the service was held. They met with attorney Joseph Rauh and organized a reform caucus to be called Miners for Democracy (MFD). Their immediate goal was to keep Yablonski's election-related lawsuits alive.

Meanwhile, the Secretary of Labor and US Attorney General ordered a full-out investigation of the election; more than 200 DOL investigators were assigned. Concluding there was fraud, DOL petitioned a federal district court to overturn the election. On January 17, 1972, the United States Supreme Court granted Trbovich permission to intervene in the DOL suit as a complainant, which allowed him and supporters to keep the election fraud suit alive.

== Miners for Democracy ==
Miners for Democracy (MFD) formed in April 1970 while the DOL investigation continued. Anticipating that a new election would be ordered, members of the organization began campaigning as its potential presidential candidates, including black-lung advocate Arnold Miller, Trbovich, and miner Elijah Wood.

On May 1, 1972, Judge William Bryant threw out the results of the 1969 UMWA international union elections. Bryant scheduled a new election to be held over the first eight days of December 1972. Additionally, Bryant agreed that DOL should oversee the election, to ensure fairness.

Over the weekend of May 26 to May 28, 1972, 800 MFD delegates from 16 UMWA districts gathered in Wheeling, West Virginia. Miller and Trbovich both sought the group's endorsement for president, with Trbovich the leading candidate going into the convention. But by Sunday, Miller had been elected MFD's presidential candidate, receiving 70.9 votes out of to Trbovich's 57.1 votes. As a consolation, Trbovich was elected the group's vice presidential nominee, receiving 84.1 votes. Harold Patrick, national co-chairman of MFD, received 76.4 votes to win the secretary-treasurer nod.

Miller had triumphed over MFD insider Trbovich after a speech by UMWA District 17 president Jack Perry, who had conducted much lobbying for him. Perry had been a founding member of the Logan County Black Lung Association. According to Cecil Roberts, then an MFD supporter and president of UMWA in 2001, "...Arnold Miller's election as UMWA president in 1972 was largely attributable to Jack's impassioned lobbying of MFD convention delegates to support Miller."

Many delegates believed that Miller had a better chance of winning the election than Trbovich. Some miners held discriminatory views toward people of Eastern European ethnicity, such as Trbovich, who comprised a later wave of 20th-century immigrants in the industry; while others felt he was too militant. Miller, meanwhile, already had a strong base in the black-lung movement, as he had been a leader in it. Trbovich was bitterly disappointed.

On December 22, 1972, the Labor Department certified Miller as UMWA's next president. The vote was 70,373 for Miller and 56,334 for Boyle. Trbovich was elected as UMWA's vice president.

== First Miller administration ==
Miller proved to be a weak president. He was markedly indecisive, changing his mind repeatedly and putting off decisions. Eventually, the reform movement he led began to stall.

Miller staffed his team with a number of young campaign staffers. These individuals had filled critical roles in the presidential campaign, but their lack of mining background alienated other, more conservative leaders such as Trbovich, who described them as "leftwing radicals from New York and Boston..."

Miller's first major defeat came in early 1973. For the first time in UMWA history, the executive board proposed and debated a budget. Miller budgeted $14 million for organizing, additional safety staff, and government relations. But he soon lost control of the council meeting to Trbovich. He was unable to obtain a motion to cut off debate or hold a vote, and the meeting ran for 14 days. In the end, the board cut $2 million from Miller's budget.

In 1974, Trbovich led another executive board rebellion against Miller. After lengthy and acrimonious debate, the board voted to cut the Miller-proposed budget for organizing and political activity by a third.

Trbovich subsequently accused Miller of financial mismanagement, and filed charges with the U.S. Dept. of Labor against the president. Miller described the charges as "politically inspired", and they were eventually found to be without merit. In retaliation, Miller took away Trbovich's supervision of the union's safety division.

Trbovich continued to attack Miller the following year. In early June 1974, Trbovich circulated a letter among UMWA's board of directors accusing Miller—and, to a lesser degree, Patrick—of gross financial mismanagement. He accused Miller of overspending and paying raises to staff who contributed little to the union's mission. He reiterated charges that Miller had let the union fall into "radical" hands.

Miller denied the charges, and counter-attacked. He accused Trbovich of keeping a public relations consultant on the payroll for six weeks longer than necessary, forcing Miller to fire her. The board's meeting turned into a shouting match between Miller and Trbovich. By that time, Trbovich had the support of 16 of the members on the board and an opposition slate was forming to challenge Miller in the 1977 presidential election.

During the Bituminous Coal Strike of 1974, Trbovich continued to snipe at Miller from the bargaining council, where he criticized Miller's proposals and tentative agreements. Miller's troubles continued into 1976 and 1977. At a meeting of United Mine Workers locals in northeastern Pennsylvania in early May, Miller and Trbovich engaged in a shouting match in front of the members. "This union is on the verge of financial disaster!" shouted Trbovich. Miller snapped back: "That's a damn lie and you know it!"

Immediately after the meeting, Miller suspended Trbovich for insubordination. He said that Trbovich had refused to investigate financial and management problems in the union's organizing programs out West. The union's board of directors reinstated Trbovich in late May. Then the board, led by Trbovich, cut $3 million from Miller's proposed $13.9 million budget. In February 1977, as Congress debated surface mining reclamation legislation, Trbovich led a revolt of 15 board members. Despite Miller's support for a ban on surface mining, the letter opposed the new legislation and suggested a state-by-state regulatory approach instead.

== Second Miller term ==
By the end of 1977, Miller's popularity had significantly waned. Some rank-and-file miners had signed a petition calling for his resignation.

So that elections would not interfere with collective bargaining talks at the end of the year, UMWA's elections were moved to June. The 1977 election was a three-way race. Opposing Miller were secretary-treasurer Harry Patrick, running on the MFD ticket; and executive board member Lee Roy Patterson, running as head of the faction associated with former president Boyle, who was serving three life terms for the murders of the Yablonski family.

Trbovich did not run for the presidency after members ridiculed his claims that communists and radicals secretly controlled the Miller administration. Instead, he backed Patrick.

Miller won re-election with 40 percent of the vote. But he emerged too weak to control the union's executive board and bargaining council; they voted for a national strike in December.

Elected as vice president was Sam Church, a former Boyle supporter and local president who became a field representative and then international representative in the Miller administration. When Church punched a former UMWA staffer in a dispute over a leak to the press, Miller asked Church to be his running-mate.

The 1977 race ended Trbovich's political role in UMWA. He drifted away from union politics and the union.

== Notes ==
Trade union offices
Preceded by George J. Titler	Vice-President of the United Mine Workers of America; 1972–1977	Succeeded by Sam Church
