= Arnold Miller =

American labor union leader

12th President of the United Mine Workers
- In office 1972–1979
- Preceded by: William Anthony Boyle
- Succeeded by: Sam Church

Personal details
- Born: April 25, 1923 Leewood, West Virginia, United States
- Died: July 12, 1985 (aged 62) Charleston, West Virginia, United States
- Occupation: Miner; Labor leader
- Known for: President, United Mine Workers of America

Arnold Ray Miller (April 25, 1923 – July 12, 1985) was a miner and labor activist who served as president of the United Mine Workers of America (UMWA), AFL–CIO, from 1972 to 1979. Winning as a reform candidate, he gained positive changes for the miners, including compensation for black lung disease. He had difficulty dealing with growing internal union opposition. His last two years as president were particularly tumultuous and he suffered two heart attacks, finally resigning in November 1979 with the title of "president emeritus for life".

== Early life and mining career ==
Miller was born in 1923 in Leewood, West Virginia, a small town in the Cabin Creek area east of Charleston. His mother was the former Lula Burgess Hoy. Miller's father, George, had gone to work in the coal mines at the age of 9 in Bell County, Kentucky. At the age of 14, George Miller was already an activist in the union and was forced to leave Kentucky by thugs employed by the mine owners.

When the mine owners broke the UMWA locals in the Cabin Creek area in 1921, Miller's father and maternal grandfather were blacklisted and unable to find work. Although Miller's mother was pregnant, his father George took a job in Fayette County working for the Gauley Mountain Coal Company (where he became president of the local miners' union). The strain of distance proved too much on the marriage and Miller's parents divorced.

Arnold Miller was subsequently raised by his mother and maternal grandparents. His grandfather, Joseph Hoy, had been president of one of the early local miners' unions in the Cabin Creek area. But rather than follow in his grandfather's and father's footsteps, Miller wanted to attend college and become a forester. Limited income and economic opportunities led Miller to quit school after completing the ninth grade. At the age of 14 in 1939, he got a job loading coal in a local coal mine (where his grandfather worked as a miner).

The Cabin Creek area had been the site of the Paint Creek–Cabin Creek strike of 1912. Miller became a Mine Workers member. It was a dangerous time to be a unionist in West Virginia: Private security forces from the Baldwin–Felts Detective Agency outnumbered miners three to one, and had standing orders to break up any group of three or more miners wherever they were—often beating or shooting miners as well.

In 1944 during World War II, Miller volunteered for the United States Army. He was trained as a machine-gunner, and severely wounded in the Normandy invasion of Europe in World War II (most of one ear was shot away). He spent nearly two years in the hospital and underwent surgery 20 times.

Miller returned to the Cabin Creek area in 1948 after the war. He served a three-year apprenticeship in an automobile garage and returned to the mines as a mechanic. He married Virginia Brown on November 26, 1948, and had three children with her, a boy and two girls. The couple divorced in 1979.

Miller joined the United Mine Workers and became active in Local 2903. This local had led the 1912-13 strike and was known for its activism. Miller was first elected to the union's safety committee and later became local president. Although he briefly considered moving to Florida, Miller instead decided to become active in national union politics. He believed the union needed to be more responsive to miners' needs.

== Black lung activism ==
After 24 years as a coal miner, Miller was diagnosed with pneumoconiosis, or "black-lung disease." Miller sought assistance from the national mine workers' union in obtaining workers' compensation from his employer. But UMWA president W. A. Boyle refused to help. "They were not just not with us, they were against us," Miller later said.

Stymied by his union, late in 1968 Miller organized other ill miners into the West Virginia Black Lung Association. They won introduction of a black-lung bill in the West Virginia state legislature. When Miller led other miners, their families and supporters on a march on the state capitol, Boyle sent legislators a telegram advising them (as Miller put it) "not to worry about those so-and-so miners." Boyle's behind-the-scenes lobbying had a significant effect at first. When Miller met with the president of the state senate, the legislator "told us raggedy miners to go back to the mines where we belonged. I got hot and told him, 'Mr. Jackson, we are going to stay here until the snow flies and we are going to turn you out to pasture.' "

Despite Boyle's efforts, the political pressure exerted by the black-lung miners was effective in the long run. Media images of hacking, dying miners—most of them young men in their 30s and 40s—caused a public outcry. Throughout the lobbying effort for the bill, Miller accused UMWA of ignoring rank-and-file miners' needs. This undercut Boyle's power, which rested on his claim that he alone represented the legitimate concerns of mine workers. On February 18, 1969, Miller and thousands of other West Virginia miners launched a 23-day wildcat strike to demand enactment of the black-lung bill. The strike resulted in the legislature passing the bill, which was the first of its kind in the U.S.

In August 1970, Miller stopped working as a miner and briefly went to work for Design for Rural Action, a community service organization. That year he was elected president of the West Virginia Black Lung Association.

== Race for presidency of UMWA ==
=== Yablonski murder ===
The United Mine Workers was in turmoil by this time. President W. A. Boyle was autocratic and bullying, and not well liked. From the beginning of his administration, Boyle faced significant opposition from rank-and-file miners and UMWA leaders. Miners' attitudes about their union had also changed. Miners wanted greater democracy and more local autonomy for their local unions. There was a widespread belief that Boyle was more concerned with protecting mine owners' interests than those of his members. Grievances filed by the union often took months — sometimes years — to resolve, lending credence to the critics' claim. Wildcat strikes occurred as local unions, despairing of UMWA assistance, sought to resolve local disputes with walkouts.

In 1969, Joseph "Jock" Yablonski challenged Boyle for the presidency of UMWA. In an election widely seen as corrupt, Boyle beat Yablonski in the election held on December 9 by a margin of nearly two-to-one (80,577 to 46,073). Yablonski conceded the election, but on December 18, 1969, asked the United States Department of Labor (DOL) to investigate the election for fraud. He also filed five civil suits against the union on charges related to the election.

On December 31, 1969, three hitmen shot Yablonski, his wife, Margaret, and his 25-year-old daughter, Charlotte, as they slept in the family home in Clarksville, Pennsylvania. The bodies were discovered on January 5, 1970. The killings had been ordered by Boyle, and the hitmen had been paid $20,000 in embezzled union funds for the job.

A few hours after the funeral, two of Yablonski's sons and several of the miners who had supported Yablonski met in the basement of the church where the service was held. They met with attorney Joseph Rauh and drew up plans for a reform caucus within the United Mine Workers.

The day after news of the Yablonski killings was published, 20,000 miners in West Virginia walked off the job in a one-day strike — they believed that Boyle was responsible for the murders.

On January 8, 1970, Yablonski's attorney waived the right to further internal review by the union and requested that DOL initiate an immediate investigation of the election. The US Attorney General ordered the FBI also to assist in the investigation. By 1972 DOL had concluded that the election was fraudulent. On January 17, 1972, the United States Supreme Court granted Mike Trbovich, a 51-year-old coal leader from District 5 (Yablonski's district), permission to intervene in the DOL suit as a complainant — keeping the suit alive.

The Labor Management Reporting and Disclosure Act (LMRDA) of 1959 regulates the internal affairs of labor unions, requiring regular secret-ballot elections for local union offices and providing for federal investigation of election fraud or impropriety. DOL is authorized under the act to sue in federal court to have the election overturned. By 1970, however, only three international union elections had been overturned by the courts.

=== Miners for Democracy ===
Miners for Democracy (MFD) formed in April 1970 while the DOL investigation was underway. Its members included most of the miners who belonged to the West Virginia Black Lung Association and many of Yablonski's supporters and campaign staff. MFD's support was strongest in southwestern Pennsylvania, eastern Ohio, and panhandle and northern West Virginia, but MFD supporters existed in nearly all affiliates. The chief organizers of Miners for Democracy included Yablonski's sons, Ken and Joseph (known as "Chip") Yablonski, both labor attorneys, and Trbovich and others. Initially, the group's sole purpose was to keep the DOL investigation of the Mine Workers alive.

DOL filed suit in federal court in 1971 to overturn the 1969 UMWA election. As the case progressed, MFD turned its focus toward building a union-wide political organization capable of contesting any new election. A number of union members were seen as potential MFD candidates, including Miller, Trbovich and miner Elijah Wood.

On May 1, 1972, Judge William Bryant threw out the results of the 1969 UMWA international union elections. Bryant scheduled a new election to be held over the first eight days of December 1972. Additionally, Bryant agreed that DOL should oversee the election, to ensure fairness.

Over the weekend of May 26 to May 28, 1972, 800 MFD delegates from 16 UMWA districts gathered in Wheeling, West Virginia. Miller and Trbovich both sought the group's endorsement for president, with Trbovich the leading candidate going into the convention. But by Sunday, Miller had been elected MFD's presidential candidate, receiving 70.9 votes out of to Trbovich's 57.1 votes. As a consolation, Trbovich was elected the group's vice presidential nominee, receiving 84.1 votes. Harold Patrick, national co-chairman of MFD, received 76.4 votes to win the secretary-treasurer nod.

Miller's victory over Trbovich was something of a surprise. Many believed the delegates had been swayed UMWA District 17 president Jack Perry. Perry had been a founding member of the Logan County Black Lung Association. According to Cecil Roberts, then an MFD supporter and now president of UMWA, "...Arnold Miller's election as UMWA president in 1972 was largely attributable to Jack's impassioned lobbying of MFD convention delegates to support Miller." Many delegates felt Miller was more likely to win any election than Trbovich. Many miners held discriminatory views toward people of Eastern European descent like Trbovich, while others felt he was too militant. Miller, meanwhile, already had a strong base in the black-lung movement. Trbovich, who had been campaign manager for Yablonski's campaign, was bitterly disappointed.

On December 22, 1972, the Labor Department certified Miller as UMWA's next president. The vote was 70,373 for Miller and 56,334 for Boyle.

Arnold Miller was the first candidate to defeat an incumbent president in UMWA history, and the first native West Virginian to lead the union.

== First presidential administration ==
=== Weakness of leadership ===
Miller proved to be a weak president. "Whoever talked to him last had his ear," one staffer said. He was markedly indecisive, changing his mind repeatedly and putting off decisions. Eventually, the reform movement he led began to stall. "He was not an exceptionally good United Mine Workers President..."

It became clear that Miller, whose only previous administrative experience had been running a 200-member local, was not capable of managing a 250,000-member union. Miller proved naive about union politics and only reluctantly controlled meetings (most of which turn into "parliamentary pandemonium, quarreling, shouting and ... nearly coming to blows"). As meetings spiraled out of control, Miller would become curt, even angry.

=== Staff problems ===
Miller named a number of Yablonski supporters to prominent positions in the union. He appointed 35-year-old Chip Yablonski general counsel. John Sulka became executive safety director, and Meyer Bernstein director of public and international affairs.

But Miller also staffed his team with a number of young who came from outside of the mines, and often unions altogether. Many of them were idealistic progressives who supported Miller's reformist cause and had filled critical roles in the presidential campaign. These appointments and others like them caused friction in the Miller administration from the start. "He suddenly felt he was not educated enough to run the Union. He relied on some of the college people who were non miners and they tended to isolate Arnold from the coal miners." The college-educated staffers also alienated other, less educated, more conservative, leaders such as Trbovich, who claimed the young staffers were "leftwing radicals from New York and Boston..."

Miller also purged the executive board that had been appointed under the Boyle administration. Miller dismissed 20 of the 24 board members, then named 13 of his own and seven of Yablonski's supporters to the board. Miller believed he had given himself a solid majority on the board, but to his dismay Boyle cronies still dominated the board. Miller assumed that miners who had won election in 1972 were MFD supporters. But many were actually Boyle men who had been elected by the rank-and-file merely because they were better known than the MFD candidates. They had supported MFD as a means of hanging onto power, not because they supported Miller or the democracy movement. Even many Miller supporters on the board broke with him before the year was out, claiming that he was mismanaging the union.

Miller's district appointments suffered the same fate. Most district officers owed their loyalty to Boyle and the district leaders he had appointed. Miller drew on this pool of talent for his district appointments, and ended up appointing more Boyle men. Conflict between the Miller administration and district leaders quickly broke into the open.

=== Early successes ===
Despite the Miller administration's problems, Miller made a number of changes which democratized UMWA. At the union's 1973 convention, Miller won support for virtually all the changes he proposed. Among the most important reforms was letting UMWA districts elect their own presidents and other officers. Miller "certainly got democracy restored to that the Union and the local union meetings were always democratic meetings with some of the guys serving as the local officers -- they were good guys. It was good to see they were accountable to their membership."

Miller's democracy movement extended to collective bargaining as well. The union's constitution was amended to give union members the right to ratify contracts, as well as formulate contract proposals. Tentative agreements were now reviewed by a "bargaining council" rather than the president and his aides. Additionally, Miller built a large and competent research department to assist with contract negotiations.

A third Miller reform came in the area of politics. Miller established UMWA's first PAC, the Coal Miners' Political Action Committee (COMPAC). COMPAC gave the union the financial and political leverage it needed in order to become more effective on the state and national level. COMPAC put financial muscle behind the union's political endorsements, giving the union legislative access and more political influence. COMPAC quickly began pressing Congress on the need for a federal black-lung program by lobbying and organizing demonstrations.

Finally, Miller greatly expanded the union's workplace health and safety staff. The number of staff rose dramatically from three in 1972 to 40 in 1975.

Miller's reforms won the union significant new numbers of members. Miners had once shunned the union for its authoritarian ways but now joined in large numbers. By the end of 1974, UMWA had started 50 organizing campaigns. Eighteen went to election, and the union won 10 of these. In Miller's first two years in office, UMWA membership climbed by 77,000 members to 277,000—nearly a 40 percent increase.

=== Collapse of the reform movement ===
As Miller's problems mounted, his reform program collapsed. He began sacrificing additional reform proposals to ensure the success of the few which had already been implemented. He openly fought with Yablonski supporters, and became suspicious of the young intellectuals on his staff as well. He also became somewhat paranoid about his enemies: He sold his home in D.C. and moved to a small, secure apartment in Arlington, Virginia, kept a baseball bat by his desk, and carried a Smith & Wesson .38 handgun to local union meetings. His leadership style became increasingly autocratic, and he adopted the trappings of power (for example, like Boyle, he began using a huge limousine) and fired staff frequently.

Miller's first major political defeat came in early 1973. For the first time in UMWA history, a budget was not only proposed but was also debated by the executive board. Miller budgeted $14 million for organizing, additional safety staff, and government relations. But he lost control of the council meeting. He could not obtain a motion to cut off debate or hold a vote, and the meeting ran for 14 days. In the end, the board cut $2 million from Miller's budget.

In early 1974, Trbovich led a second executive board rebellion against Miller. After lengthy and acrimonious debate, the board voted to cut the Miller-proposed budget for organizing and political activity by a third.

Trbovich subsequently accused Miller of financial mismanagement, and filed charges with the U.S. Dept. of Labor against Miller. Stung by its previous lax enforcement, the agency quickly began investigating Trbovich's charges. Miller and secretary-treasurer Patrick labeled the accusations "politically inspired", and the charges were eventually found to be without merit. In retaliation, Miller took away Trbovich's supervision of the union's safety division.

=== 1974 strike ===
During these troubles, Miller faced renegotiating a national coal collective bargaining agreement. UMWA's bargaining demands included a 40 percent wage and benefit increase, stronger health and safety language, guaranteed sick leave, and higher employer contributions to the union's health and pension funds. UMWA struck on November 12, 1974. A tentative agreement was rejected twice by UMWA's bargaining council (once prior to and once during the strike). Finally the government threatened to bring a Taft-Hartley injunction against the union to force the miners back to work. A settlement was reached on December 10.

The 1974 agreement was the richest contract in UMW history. But the membership's unhappiness with the new collective bargaining agreement led to a continuing wave of wildcat strikes, and significantly slowed the union's organizing growth.

=== Continuing troubles ===
In 1975, Miller fired John Sulka, the union's executive safety director. The cause of his termination was disagreement over how strongly the union should continue to pressure employers on safety. Miller felt miners were not giving his reforms a chance to work, while Sulka wished to continue to move forward. Later that year, Chip Yablonski resigned as general counsel.

Miller became increasingly defensive. He added security at union headquarters, and demanded that all staff travel plans be cleared through him so he could detect plotting. When he suspected one of his secretaries of plotting with a political challenger, he had the door to her office removed.

Trbovich, too, continued to attack Miller. In early June, 1974, Trbovich circulated a letter among UMWA's board of directors accusing Miller — and, to a lesser degree, Patrick — of gross financial mismanagement. He accused Miller of overspending and paying raises to staff who contributed little to the union's mission, and reiterated charges that Miller had let the union fall into "radical" hands. Miller denied the charges, and counter-attacked. He accused Trbovich of keeping a public relations consultant on the payroll for six weeks longer than necessary, forcing Miller to fire her. The board's meeting turned into a shouting match between Miller and Trbovich. By that time, Trbovich had the support of 16 of the members on the board and an opposition slate was forming to challenge Miller in the 1977 presidential election.

Miller's troubles continued into 1976 and 1977. At a meeting of United Mine Workers locals in northeastern Pennsylvania in early May, Miller and Trbovich engaged in a shouting match in front of the members. "This union is on the verge of financial disaster!" shouted Trbovich. Miller snapped back: "That's a damn lie and you know it!" Immediately after the meeting, Miller suspended Trbovich for insubordination. His claim was that Trbovich had refused to investigate financial and management problems in the union's organizing programs out West. The union's board of directors reinstated Trbovich in late May. Then the board, led by Trbovich, cut $3 million from Miller's proposed $13.9 million budget. In February 1977, as Congress debated surface mining reclamation legislation, Trbovich led a revolt of 15 board members. Despite Miller's support for a ban on surface mining, the letter opposed the new legislation and suggested a state-by-state regulatory approach instead.

The ongoing internal problems continued to affect UMWA organizing. In late 1976, the union lost an organizing drive in Bell County, Kentucky, because of the political fractiousness.

Under Miller's leadership, the union had a lukewarm response to support for women miners. A 1978 landmark complaint to the Department of Labor's Office of Federal Contract Compliance Programs was brought by the Coal Employment Project, a women's advocacy organization. Named were 153 coal companies which were ordered to hire one woman for every three men until women constituted 20% of the workforce. The same year, a CEP endorsement request resulted in the failure of Miller to submit to the International Executive Board. By the next quarter, with a concerted effort by UMWA women, the IEB passed the support endorsement. Nine women were among the 1,267 delegates to the UMWA constitutional convention a year later. Miller's vice president and successor, Sam Church, responded with an off-color joke when pressed by the women for the addition to the contract for affirmative action and improved sickness and accident coverage.

== Final term ==
=== Re-election ===
By the end of 1977, Miller's popularity had significantly waned. Some rank-and-file miners had signed a petition calling for his resignation.

So that elections would not interfere with collective bargaining talks at the end of the year, UMWA's elections were moved to June.

The 1977 election was a three-way race. Opposing Miller were secretary-treasurer Harry Patrick, running on the MFD ticket, and executive board member Lee Roy Patterson, running as head of the Boyle faction.

Initially, Miller's candidacy was somewhat conservative. He focused his campaign on his record of ending corruption, enhancing mine safety and winning sizeable pay increases. But in order to shore up support during the campaign, Miller agreed to seek additional democratic reforms advocated by militant district leaders. One reform would have given local unions the right to strike on their own.

Miller won re-election. He received 40 percent of the vote. With only half of all eligible miners voting, Miller won the race with the support of just 20 percent of the membership. Few observers believed he would emerge strong enough from the election to control the union's executive board and bargaining council and avoid a national strike in December.

Elected as vice president was Sam Church, a former Boyle supporter and local president who became a field representative and then international representative in the Miller administration. When Church punched a former UMWA staffer in a dispute over a leak to the press, Miller asked Church to be his running-mate. Elected secretary-treasurer was Willard "Bill" Esselstyn, a 31-year-old miner from District 5 and a former Yablonski supporter.

=== 1977–78 strike ===
When the national bituminous coal contract expired in 1977, UMWA struck on December 6.

The right of local unions to strike was the primary issue in the negotiations. During his re-election campaign, Miller had been forced to accept as a collective bargaining goal the right to strike over local issues. But the owners rejected Miller's demand because they saw he was unable to bring wildcat strikers back to the bargaining table.

UMWA's negotiating position was not an enviable one. Power utilities and iron and steel manufacturers had built up stockpiles of coal, the number of coal mines controlled by UMWA had fallen, and the 1973 oil crisis had ended (lowering the demand for coal).

Miller had also hurt himself. He had fired many of his supporters and most of the research department staff. Miller relied instead on a law firm for bargaining advice, which caused confusion among UMWA negotiators and sent mixed signals to the employers.

Sporadic violence broke out, and a few governors mobilized their state police and National Guard. But for the most part, the coal fields remained calm.

A tentative agreement was reached February 6, 1978, which imposed penalties for wildcat strikes and chronic absenteeism, turned the union's health and pension plans over to the employers, forced workers to pay part of their health insurance premiums, and instituted a bonus system for productivity increases.

The union's bargaining council rejected the tentative agreement on February 12.

A second tentative agreement was reached. UMWA spent $40,000 on television and radio advertising to sell the pact, which backfired. The UMWA membership rejected the tentative contract by a margin of 2 to 1.

On March 6, President Jimmy Carter invoked the national emergency provision of the Taft–Hartley Act and a federal district court issued a temporary injunction ordering the miners back to work on March 9. The striking miners ignored the injunction, and the federal government did little to enforce the order.

But a growing number of union members had backed off their earlier demand for the right to strike over local issues. Many miners began to realize that the strikes were hurting the union's organizing chances and lowering employer contributions to the union health and pension funds (which were near bankruptcy).

Eventually, UMWA and mine negotiators settled on new, improved dispute resolution procedures which they hoped would lower the number of wildcat strikes. Once more, Miller and his leadership worked hard to convince members that the contract was a good one. This time, the miners approved the tentative contract by vote of 57 percent to 43 percent.

The pact was widely seen as concessionary for giving up union health and pension benefits, imposing health insurance premium co-pays, reimposing productivity-based wages, and failing to win the right to strike over local issues.

While ratification of the agreement was a victory for Miller, it also signaled the end of his effectiveness as leader of the United Mine Workers of America.

== Resignation and death ==
On March 29, 1978, just ten days after the coal mining contract was ratified, Miller suffered a stroke while on vacation in Miami Beach, Florida. On April 12, 1978, while still in the hospital, Miller suffered a mild heart attack.

Miller's deteriorating health made him into a mere figurehead. Vice president Sam Church quietly assumed the day-to-day operations of the union.

Mostly recovered by the fall, Miller exhibited many of his autocratic, defensive habits. He told the union's executive board on October 29 that he was considering resigning. Then, in the same speech, he accused Church of plotting to against him to seize the presidency of the union.

Miller continued to fight with the union's executive board and leadership, but ill health ended his presidency. In November 1979, Miller suffered a second heart attack while at his home in Charleston, West Virginia. By this time, his political opponents had decided that his erratic behavior and poor physical condition justified putting him on involuntary leave.

Church traveled to Charleston. At Miller's bedside, Church negotiated Miller's resignation. In return, UMWA's executive board agreed to give Miller the title of "president emeritus for life" and guaranteed him his full salary as well as medical and pension benefits until the end of his term of office (which would end in 1982). Miller resigned the presidency of the United Mine Workers on November 16, 1979.

The UMWA executive board named Sam Church president. Church proved to be as autocratic as his former political mentor, Tony Boyle. Two years later, Miller told reporters that he was sorry he had named Church as his running mate and that he was "not very happy" about Church becoming union president.

In 1982, Miller announced he was running for president of the Mine Workers again. But, his candidacy proved to have little support and he exited the race quietly. That year, Richard Trumka defeated Sam Church for the presidency of the Mine Workers, becoming the second person to defeat an incumbent UMWA president.

Miller's health continued to deteriorate. He collapsed in May 1985 and entered a coma. Miller died on July 12, 1985, in Charleston, West Virginia. His political nemesis, Tony Boyle, had died in prison six weeks earlier, on May 31.

Noting Miller's passing, UMWA president Richard Trumka cited Miller's commitment to democracy and the health of miners as a lasting legacy. "Possibly Miller's greatest achievements were the internal reforms he instituted within our union and the historic breakthrough he led in the area of black lung legislation," Trumka said. Trumka observed that Miller had achieved these goals "in the face of what seemed, at times, overwhelming odds."

== See also ==
- Black Lung Benefits Act of 1972

Preceded by W. A. Boyle	President, United Mine Workers of America; 1972 - 1979	Succeeded by Sam Church
