= Act of Vengeance (1986 film) =

- Dutch VHS cover
- Genre: Biography; Crime; Drama
- Written by: Trevor Armbrister; Scott Spencer
- Directed by: John Mackenzie
- Starring: Charles Bronson; Ellen Burstyn; Wilford Brimley
- Theme music composer: Frankie Miller
- Country of origin: United States
- Original language: English

Production
- Executive producers: Frank Konigsberg; Larry Sanitsky
- Producers: Anthony Kramreither; Jack Clements; Iris Sawyer
- Production locations: Nemacolin, Pennsylvania; Pittsburgh; Toronto
- Cinematography: Phil Meheux
- Editors: Malcolm Cooke; Steve Singleton
- Running time: 95 minutes
- Production companies: Frank Konigsberg Productions; Lorimar Telepictures; HBO Premiere Films; Telepictures Productions; Telepix Canada Corp.

Original release
- Network: HBO
- Release: April 20, 1986

Act of Vengeance is a 1986 television movie starring Charles Bronson, Ellen Burstyn, Wilford Brimley, and Keanu Reeves in an early role.

== Plot ==
The movie is based on the book, Act of Vengeance by Trevor Armbrister, a fact-based story about the corruption that occurred during the United Mine Workers' presidential elections in 1969. The film also portrayed the murder of Joseph "Jock" Yablonski.

== Cast ==
- Charles Bronson as Joseph "Jock" Yablonski
- Ellen Burstyn as Margaret Yablonski
- Wilford Brimley as Tony Boyle
- Hoyt Axton as Silous Huddleston
- Robert Schenkkan as Paul Gilly
- Ellen Barkin as Annette Gilly
- Maury Chaykin as Claude Vealey
- Caroline Kava as Charlotte Yablonski
- Peg Murray as Ellen Rogers
- William Newman as Ezra Morgan
- Alan North as Albert Pass
- Raynor Scheine as Terrance Madden
- Gordon Michael Woolvett as Bobby (credited as Gordon Woolvett)
- Alf Humphreys as Ken Yablonski
- Joseph Kell as Chip Yablonski
- Ken Pogue as Earl Skidmore
- Keanu Reeves as Buddy Martin (credited as Keannu Reeves)

== Casting Charles Bronson ==
For the HBO television film, Bronson acted against type and said "it's a complete departure for me, I'm not wearing a moustache, and I'm not carrying a gun. I don't perform any violence in this film." He also explained since he didn't act for television in a long time, he had to think a lot about it before accepting which he did partly because of his background in mining. For his commitment on this project, Bronson dropped out of a lead role in The Delta Force (1986).

== Release ==
=== Home media ===
It premiered on April 20, 1986 on HBO. The film was released on VHS by HBO/Cannon Video. However, it has never been released on DVD or Blu-ray by Warner Bros. Home Entertainment.

== Reception ==
Greg Burliuk of the Kingston Whig-Standard said it is "a crackling good thriller". Furthermore he praised the actors and the direction.

Robert DiMatteo of The Advocate-Messenger praised Bronson acting against type. He felt that Mackenzie's direction was especially good when handling the antagonists by saying "he brings out a disturbing comic cretenism in his villains".

Michael Walch of The Province felt that the movie didn't have a good balance between the Yablonski and Paul Gilly's story and was out of focus. He thought Bronson was miscast, and characters that surround Paul Gilly reduced the quality of the performance of actor Robert Schenkkan.

Joel Pisetzner of The Record said "it is not a bad movie, merely an incredible underachiever." He felt that Mackenzie made Yablonski too much of a Saint instead of a man hence his story is less interesting than the one of his killer Paul Gilly. While praising the acting, especially of Barkin and Brimley, he also felt many elements of the story were unexplored.
