= Sam Church =

American politician

13th President of the United Mine Workers
- In office 1979–1982
- Preceded by: Arnold Miller
- Succeeded by: Richard Trumka

Personal details
- Born: September 20, 1936 Matewan, West Virginia, U.S.
- Died: July 14, 2009 (aged 72) Bristol, Virginia, U.S.
- Occupation: Coal miner; Labor leader
- Known for: President, United Mine Workers of America

Samuel Morgan Church, Jr. (September 20, 1936 – July 14, 2009) was a coal miner and president of the United Mine Workers of America (UMWA) from 1979 to 1982.

== Early life ==
Church was born in Matewan, West Virginia, in 1936 to Samuel and Helen (Cook) Church. He was one of eight children. His grandfather had been a mine superintendent, and his father had worked as a miner until an accident crushed his foot (forcing him to leave the mines and become a barber). The Churches moved to Virginia in 1944, where Sam worked as a shoeshine boy and pinsetter at a bowling alley. He participated in his first strike at the bowling alley, but the employer fired all the striking workers.

At the age of 20 in 1956, Church moved to Baltimore, Maryland, and took a job at a sugar plant.

== Union career ==
Sam Church returned to Virginia in 1965 and worked for the Clinchfield Coal Company as an electrician and mechanic. He rose quickly within the union, and was elected a UMWA field representative for District 28 in 1973. Although he supported W. A. Boyle for UMWA president in 1972, he joined Arnold Miller's reform movement after evidence of Boyle's complicity in the murder of Joseph Yablonski became known.

In 1975, Church became an international field representative and a member of Miller's headquarters staff. In 1976, he was named deputy director of the UMWA collective bargaining department, and later that year Miller named Church his executive assistant.

In 1977, Church was elected vice president of the union. When Church punched a former UMWA staffer in a dispute over a leak to the press, Miller asked Church to be his running-mate. But Miller was not in good health, and after a stroke and heart attack in the spring of 1978 he turned day-to-day operation of the union over to Church. Mostly recovered by the fall, Miller exhibited many of his autocratic, defensive habits. He told the union's executive board on October 29, 1979 that he was considering resigning. Then, in the same speech, he accused Church of plotting against him to seize the presidency of the union.

Miller continued to fight with the union's executive board and leadership, but ill health ended his presidency. In November 1979, Miller suffered a second heart attack while at his home in Charleston, West Virginia. By this time, his political opponents had decided that his erratic behavior and poor physical condition justified putting him on involuntary leave. Church traveled to Charleston, and sitting at Miller's bedside he negotiated Miller's resignation. In return, UMWA's executive board agreed to give Miller the title of "president emeritus for life" and guaranteed him his full salary as well as medical and pension benefits until the end of his term of office (which would end in 1982). Miller resigned the presidency of the United Mine Workers on November 16, 1979, and Church was elected to succeed him.

Two years later, Miller told reporters that he was sorry he named Church his running mate and that he was "not very happy" about Church becoming union president.

=== UMWA presidency ===
Church's tenure as president of UMWA was a difficult one. An epidemic of wildcat strikes and increasing automation severely affected its membership and revenues. Church set out to reverse the union's decline: In 1981, he led the union out on a two-month nationwide coal strike. After union members rejected a tentative agreement, he negotiated a new contract which led to substantial improvements in benefits.

However, when Church ran for re-election as UMWA president in 1982, he was defeated. Union members were upset that Church had not continued to reform the union. And despite Church's victory in the 1981 coal strike, miners felt the union's collective bargaining power and clout at the worksite had not been restored.

Also dissatisfied were 3000 women miners who were hired after successful 1978 discrimination complaint brought by the Department of Labor Office of Federal Contract Compliance Program and the Coal Employment Project, a women’s advocacy organization. Named were 153 companies. Church had responded with an off-color joke when pressed by the women for the addition to the contract for affirmative action and improved sickness and accident coverage. Thus women miners strongly supported his opponent.

The 1982 UMWA presidential campaign was hard-fought and bitter. Church and his supporters allegedly accused Church's opponent, Richard Trumka, of having ties to Communist and socialist groups and being ineligible to run for president. In the end, however, Trumka won election by a margin of more than two-to-one.

== Later life ==
Church remained active in the miners' union after his election loss, however. He became coordinator of the Virginia Coal Miners' Political Action Committee (COMPAC). He also was involved in politics. Church was a former member of the Appalachia, Virginia, town council and Wise County, Virginia, Board of Supervisors.

Church's first marriage produced three children (Samuel 3rd, Melissa, and Suzanne), but ended in divorce. He then married the former Patti Page, an attorney. The couple had one son, Nathaniel.

Church suffered from Parkinson's disease in the last few years of his life, and died in Bristol, Virginia, on July 14, 2009, from complications due to surgery.

== Notes ==
Trade union offices
Preceded by Mike Trbovich	Vice-President of the United Mine Workers of America; 1977–1979	Succeeded by Wilbert Killion
Preceded by Arnold Miller	President of the United Mine Workers of America; 1979–1982	Succeeded by Richard Trumka
