= Black lung movement =

US campaign for compensation for coal miners

- Meeting of the Beckley (West Virginia) Black Lung Association
- Formation: 1968
- Founders: Miners in Montgomery, West Virginia
- Location(s): Appalachia (mainly West Virginia, Kentucky, and Virginia)
- Key people: Arnold Miller, I. E. Buff, Donald Rasmussen

The black lung movement is a grassroots campaign by coal miners, their families and physicians, which started in the 1960s in the Appalachian coalfields, for recognition of coal workers' pneumoconiosis ("black lung") as a compensable occupational disease and for reducing coal dust levels in the mines. Activism in 1968–1969, including a statewide wildcat strike, led to the Federal Coal Mine Health and Safety Act of 1969, which created the first federal black lung compensation program. Local lobbying and operations continue in Kentucky, Virginia and West Virginia under the Black Lung Association.

== Background ==
Coal mining expanded and became more mechanized in the 20th century, and more miners began to develop what was first called "miner's asthma," considered a mild disease associated with working in dusty mines and with the stressful environment of the area. Subsequently, three studies by the United States Public Health Service between 1924 and 1945 did not result in the disease being designated as disabling. While Britain had recognized coal-related pneumoconiosis as compensable in 1943, American physicians working on the issue at the time stated that the symptoms were a normal part of mine work.

From 1942 to 1968, miners campaigned so that the United Mine Workers of America (UMWA) convention would pursue compensation for the disease. The union leadership finally acted in 1968, when union president Tony Boyle backed recognition of the disease at the state level.

== Origins in West Virginia (1968–1969) ==
In November 1968 an explosion at the Consolidation Coal Company's No. 9 mine in Farmington killed 78 miners. Television coverage of the aftermath, in which officials and the UMWA president defended the company, contributed to a belief that the mining system needed reform from below.

In Fayette County, miners collaborated with physicians such as I. E. Buff and Donald Rasmussen to educate workers about the disease. In December 1968 a small group of miners in Montgomery formed the Black Lung Association and hired attorney Paul Kaufman to oversee the drafting of a state compensation bill.

=== 1969 strike ===
On January 26, 1969, black lung activists from around the state met in Charleston. On February 18, 282 miners at a Raleigh County mine went on strike over the issue, and the walkout spread across southern West Virginia. On February 26, about 2,000 miners protested at the state capitol, and then-Governor Arch Moore promised a bill for a special legislative session. More than 40,000 miners in the state later stopped working, and under pressure from miners at the capitol the legislature passed West Virginia's 1969 legislation, the first in the state to make black lung compensable.

== Federal legislation ==
The events in West Virginia made black lung a national issue. Doctors Buff, Rasmussen and Hawey Wells, along with Farmington widows and miners, traveled to Washington to testify before congressional committees about the disease. Although President Richard Nixon criticized the black lung provisions of the bill, he signed the Federal Coal Mine Health and Safety Act of 1969 on December 30, 1969. The act set limits on respirable dust in mines and created the federal Black Lung Program.

Part C of the program states that mine operators are responsible for paying benefits, and the federal government pays when no responsible operator can. The Black Lung Benefits Revenue Act of 1977 moved these federal payments from general revenue to a new Black Lung Disability Trust Fund, financed mainly by an excise tax on domestically sold coal, so that the coal industry rather than taxpayers would bear the cost. The federal treasury carried most of the cost into the 1980s.

== The Black Lung Association in the early 1970s ==
In a 1971 letter, Black Lung Association president Arnold Miller described the group's aims as making coal mining safer and healthier and ensuring that disabled miners were cared for. The association had organized more than 5,000 members in four coal-producing states.

The West Virginia University archives hold Black Lung Association collections, including a 1971 benefits guide ("Black Lung Billy") produced by the West Virginia association to explain how affected miners could benefit from the available support programs.

== Later developments ==
Certain presumptions of disability for claims filed on or after January 1, 1982, were ended by 1981 amendments, and the 2010 Affordable Care Act restored the presumption for miners with 15 or more years of employment and a negative x-ray but other evidence of total respiratory disability, which eased survivors' claims.

By 2023 the number of beneficiaries nationwide had fallen to 27,572, receiving about $149 million a year, compared with about 80,000 miners and family members receiving roughly $460 million annually in the early 2000s.

== Recent activism (2025–present) ==
Prevalence of coal workers' pneumoconiosis in Central Appalachia has risen recently; a 2026 study covering 1974–2025 found that prevalence there continues to increase. Advocates attribute part of the increase to miners cutting through more rock, and therefore more silica, to reach thinner coal seams.

=== Silica rule ===
In April 2024 the Mine Safety and Health Administration finalized a rule lowering the permissible exposure limit for respirable crystalline silica to 50 micrograms per cubic meter of air. Coal industry groups sued, calling the rule unrealistic, and the rule was put on hold in 2025. In April 2026 the agency postponed the compliance deadline for metal and nonmetal mines indefinitely.

=== Support Our Miners Act ===
On June 30, 2026, the Support Our Miners Act was introduced by Representatives Summer Lee, Chris Deluzio and Morgan McGarvey to raise black lung disability payments and index them to inflation. The monthly benefit for a single miner, about $794, was roughly two-thirds of its 1970 value in inflation-adjusted terms. In late September 2026, miners, family members and clinicians from four states met with members of Congress to urge passage of the bill and implementation of the silica rule, including Nicholas County Black Lung Association president Bink Mooney.

== See also ==
- Coal workers' pneumoconiosis
- Black Lung Benefits Act
- United Mine Workers of America
- Miners for Democracy
- Farmington Mine disaster
