= Coal Employment Project =

Woman organization to become coal miners

The Coal Employment Project (CEP) was a non-profit women's organization in the United States from 1977 to 1996 with the goal of women gaining employment as miners. With local support groups in both the eastern and western coalfields, CEP also advocated for women on issues such as sexual harassment, mine safety, equal access to training and promotions, parental leave, and wages.

Originally headquartered in Jacksboro, TN, CEP moved to Oak Ridge and added field offices in Hazard, KY, Westernport, MD, and Denver, CO, as well as regional support teams. Its last headquarters were in Knoxville, TN.

== Founding ==
Women working in the coal mining industry is not recent nor rare. Hundreds of male coal miners brought their wives with them to coal mining camps in the early 1900s. Just because the female sex was not allowed in the mines themselves did not mean they did not help. Living in tents while raising children, cooking, cleaning, and taking part in strikes that demanded better pay and labor conditions for their husbands were only some of the events they participated in. It was only natural that they demanded a larger role in the coal mining workplace. Moreover, during the mid-to-late 1900s, coal mining jobs were often the only well paying jobs in Appalachia. The average starting wage was $60 per day, and the U.S. federal government projected up to 45,000 new coal mining jobs every year until 1985.

The superstition that a woman even entering a mine was bad luck and results in disaster was pervasive among male miners. The spark that lead to the organization's founding was when a woman team member from two Tennessee grassroots advocacy organizations, the East Tennessee Research Corporation (ETRC) and Save Our Cumberland Mountains, was barred from a planned mine tour to better understand deep mining operations. Before they could go on the tour, the groups were required to submit the names of those who would enter the mine. Such was the standard procedure to ensure that the coal companies could obtain signed waivers to prevent liability suits. The mine operator therefore saw the woman team member's name and told the ETRC director that the woman could not go on the tour. He claimed that, if she did, "the men would walk out; the mine would shut down." Thus, the men went on the tour and the woman did not.

Following the tour, both attending groups determined that the mine operator preventing a woman from going on a tour was a clear sign that a woman was not likely to be hired for a coal mining job. They also agreed that women would not gain any economic equality in Appalachia if the coal industry continued to systemically discriminate against women like in this case. The ETRC director then contacted attorney Betty Jean Hall, and the two began to seek funding for an organization to research issues related to women's employment in the industry. The first funding came from a $5,000 grant from the Ms. Foundation.

== Strategies ==
=== Initial research ===
CEP's first task was to research and record employment practices in the coal mining industry. What they found from the latest available federal records was that men made up 96.8 percent of all individuals working in the coal industry and made up 99.8 percent of all coal miners in the United States. This information, amongst others, was prepared into a background paper that became the catalyst for CEP's advocacy and technical assistance to community organizations and their outreach to women seeking jobs in the coal mining industry.

CEP also talked to women and men in the coal mining areas of Tennessee and Kentucky. This fieldwork revealed that numerous women were interested in working in the coal industry and that most women would not have trouble working as coal miners since the job was increasingly mechanized.

=== Legal actions ===
The initial legal strategy was based upon Executive Order 11246 signed in 1965 by U.S. President Lyndon Johnson, which bars sex discrimination by companies with federal contracts. Tennessee Valley Authority, the largest publicly owned U.S. power company, held coal contracts with many Kentucky and Tennessee coal companies. Based upon this, CEP founder Betty Jean Hall filed a landmark discrimination complaint on May 11, 1978, with the Department of Labor Office of Federal Contract Compliance Program. Named were 153 companies, among them coal companies Peabody Energy and Consolidated Coal (now called Consol Energy) produced about half of nation's coal. The complaint called for the hiring of one woman for every three inexperienced men until women constituted 20 percent of the workforce. The aforementioned background paper also accompanied the complaint. The Kentucky Human Rights Commission began cases against coal companies on discrimination against women in 1975.

This legal strategy was successful. Almost 3,000 women were hired by the close of 1979 as underground miners. In December 1978, Consolidated Coal Company was ordered to implement affirmative action and agreed to pay $360,000 in compensation to 78 women who had been denied jobs between 1972 and 1976.

=== Other efforts ===
CEP produced a grassroots newsletter, Coalmining Women’s Support Team News, and held national meetings, called the National Conference of Women Miners.

== U.S. Women's Bureau ==
From 1978 to 1980, the U.S. Department of Labor Women's Bureau contracted with CEP to carry out a two-phase, experimental program in the five-county area of Anderson, Campbell, Claiborne, Morgan, and Scott that CEP serviced in Tennessee. Phase one was the development of a training program that considered the needs of women—which was accomplished with the aid of federal and state mining officials, coal industry leaders, union officials, U.S. Department of Labor Mine Safety and Health officials, state training instructors, and actual women miners. The program itself focused on federally required safety instruction, information on federal and state antidiscrimination laws, union rights, physical development, techniques on assertiveness, and credit and social security rights. Also involved were all-women panels that discussed how they handled problems that often concerned women, like sexual harassment.

Phase two centered on recruitment, training, and job placement assistance. The completed program was applied to 20 women, who all underwent two weeks of intensive training in fall 1980. The following profiles were compiled of two graduates:

A divorced mother of two children did not have shoes to wear to the program when she began training. After getting a job at a coal mine, she reported to her support group that she had been able to clear $244 from a paycheck. The young mother of a small child whom she was raising by herself had limited work experience at a sawmill. After training she was employed as a parts runner for a mining company, where she reported that she was "very happy with my new job...not to mention the wages and benefits."

== United Mine Workers of America (UMWA) ==
United Mine Workers of America (UMWA), the largest miners' union, initially had a lukewarm approach to CEP and support for women miners. A 1978 CEP endorsement request resulted in the failure of President Arnold Miller to submit to the International Executive Board. By the next quarter, with a concerted effort by UMWA women, the IEB passed the support endorsement. Nine women were among the 1,267 delegates to the UMWA constitutional convention a year later. Miller's successor, Sam Church, responded with an off-color joke when pressed by the women for the addition to the contract for affirmative action and improved sickness and accident coverage.

With the election in 1982 of Church's opponent, Richard Trumpka, UMWA's support for women miners changed substantially. UMWA women strongly supported his candidacy. The union officially endorsed the CEP Annual Conference, and Trumpka was the keynote speaker in 1983. Trumpka approved excused absences for women to attend CEP conferences and sent letters to local unions urging them to send women to the conferences.

Women miners pushed for significant changes in contracts with the Bituminous Coal Operators Association (BCOA). Most notably, at the 1979 National Conference of Women Miners they called for a parental leave resolution. At the 1983 UMWA convention, they successfully lobbied miners to include a parental leave policy in their contract demands. The BCOA cited high costs of parental leave in arguments against the policy but agreed to study the issue further. Women miners became part of a wave of women workers who called for a federal parental leave policy, culminating in the Family and Medical Leave Act of 1993.

== Job loss in the nineties ==
At the close of the 1980s, women in coal mining peaked at about 4,000, 4 percent of the total. In the 1990s, the demand for coal decreased, mechanization in underground mining increased, and production in surface strip mining increased. These factors led to widespread layoffs. CEP, at its 1990 national meeting, held sessions on options for displaced miners meeting women's needs based on changes in the industry. Noted by an Illinois miner, “...no one wants to hire women anymore; they don’t even make excuses about why it’s done on seniority alone.” The "last hired first fired" practice meant that thousands of women lost their jobs. In 1996, the number of women miners had dropped to about a thousand.

== Media coverage ==
Appalshop, a media group in Whitesburg, Kentucky produced a film Coalmining Women in 1982. CEP staff as well as women miners and support groups started by CEP are featured throughout the film. Interviewed at home and on the job, the women miners talk about why they sought these jobs. They also tell of the problems encountered once hired.

== CEP Archives ==
In August 2013 a reunion of CEP staff, women miners (current and former) and their supporters was held in Jonesborough, TN. Attendees were from the U.S., Canada, and England. During the reunion, attendees visited East Tennessee State University (ETSU) where the CEP records are archived at the Archives of Appalachia.
