= Miners for Democracy =

Movement within the UMWA union

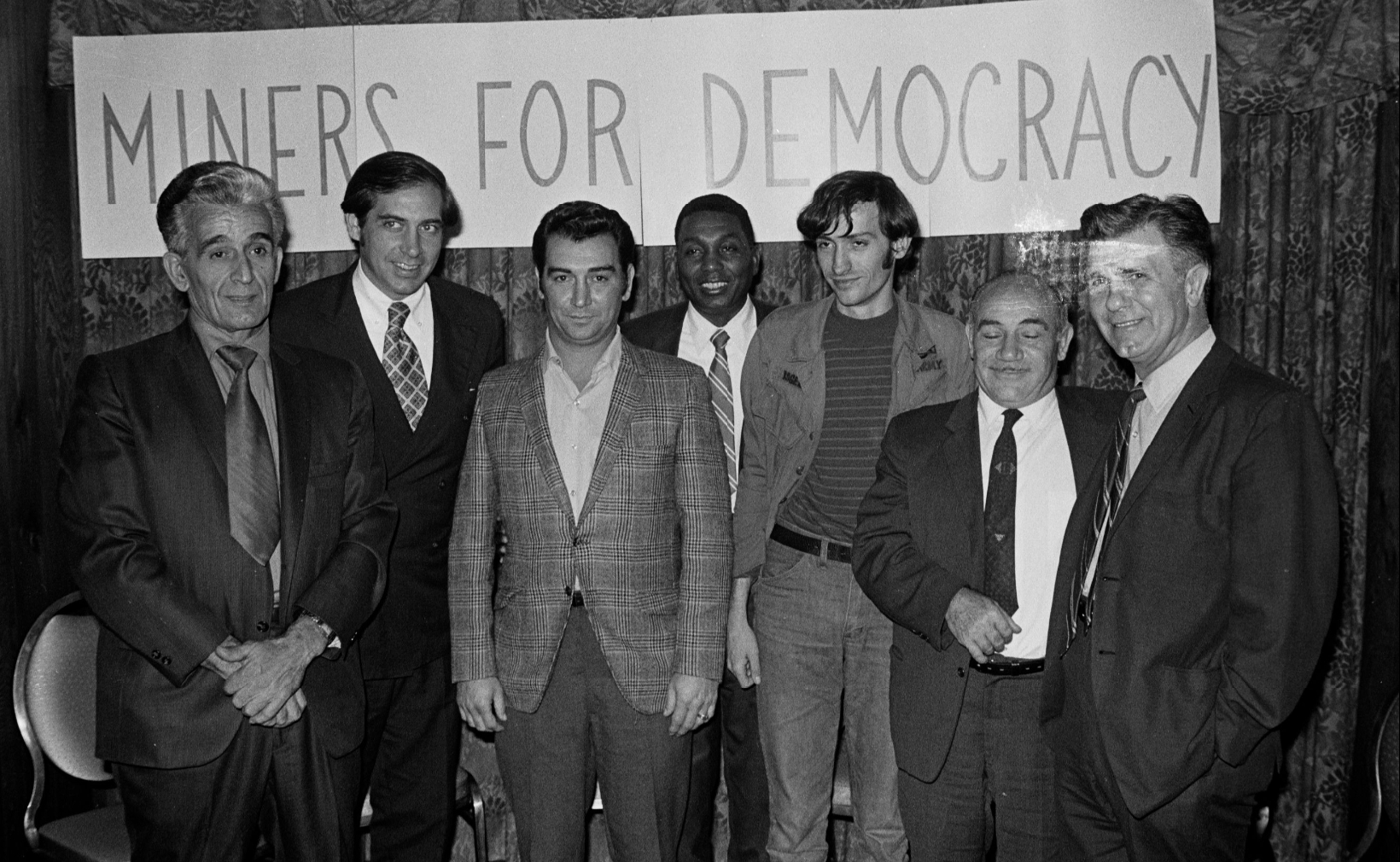
October 25, 1970 Miners for Democracy press conference photo at the Commodore Hotel. L-R: Mike Trbovich, Joseph "Chip" Yablonski, Steven Kovich, Bill Finley, James Rogers, Lou Antal, and Joe Daniels.

Miners for Democracy was a dissident movement within the United Mine Workers of America which created successful reform in the union's administration of the union in the early 1970s. It was organized in Clarksville, Pennsylvania in April 1970 after the funeral of Joseph "Jock" Yablonski, after the current president hired assassins for his murder. MFD formed with the mission to challenge the UMWA's current administration, decentralize the union and bring power back to the rank-and-file miners. MFD worked closely with the Black Lung Association (BLA), who also openly opposed the Tony Boyle administration. BLA formed in 1969 led by Arnold Miller and Charles Brooks, and Miller would later be chosen by MFD as a candidate to replace Boyle as president during union reform. Mike Trbovich, who was chairman of MFD, became the vice president of the union under the Miller administration.

== Motives behind MFD's formation ==
MFD stood in opposition to corruption that was taking place within the UMW's administration throughout Tony Boyle's time as president of the union. In the decade leading up to the murder of Joseph Yablonski, author John Gaventa claims that many rank-and-file members of the union saw UMWA leadership as becoming dictatorial and corrupt. Forms of corruption identified by MFD as taking place in the union during this time were related to election interference, the administrators favoring the economic interests of the mines over the miners health and safety, and a misuse of union funds, including the use of union funds to hire assassins for the murder of Yablonski.

In the late 1960s the safety division of the UMWA consisted of a single employee, while the Bureau of mines only had 250 inspectors for 5,400 mines. Robin Kaiser-Schlatzlein claims that this was reflected in the 1968 explosion of the No.9 mine of the Consolidation coal mines in Farmington, West Virginia, which left 78 miners dead. In response to the disaster, Boyle was quoted as saying “As long as we mine coal, there is always this inherent danger of explosion”. Chad Montrie says that this caused further frustration among miners who already saw problems with safety concerns in union administration. While the cause of the accident was never determined, methane levels in the mine were high and important safety measures like rock dusting were not occurring routinely, both of which were frequently the cause of mine explosions. Richard Fry believes that a lack of safety concerns in the Bureau of Mines amplified these issues. In April 1970, bureau found over 1000 violations across 108 mines, but did not have enough employees to enforce sanctions on the mine owners.

Election interference took place in the form of intimidation as well as direct interference with ballots. During the election, Boyle and his supporters used violence and intimidation to try and prevent miners from voting for Yablonski. Boyle won the 1969 election with 64% of votes. The same year that Boyle was investigated by the Department of Labor for fraud in the election, he was also being investigated for the misuse of union funds. He was sentenced to 5 years in prison and $179,520 in fines and restitution in March 1972 after an investigation into his mismanagement of union funds. He only served six hours in jail before his attorney paid the fines and restitution in full, and he was released. Two months later, his presidency was voided by a Federal judge on the grounds of voter fraud and irregularities in the 1969 election. The union was overseen by the Department of Labor until a new election could be held in December 1972.

=== Challenging the election ===
On January 20, 1970, a former campaign manager for Yablonski, Chairman Mike Trbovich, allowed Joe Rauh to officially challenge the 1969 UMWA election. Thanks to the Landrum-Griffin Act, which provided federal oversight of unions to protect workers and industry from corruption, Secretary Schultz filed suit in federal court, in March of that same year. A quote from Shultz says he headed “the most widespread and painstaking investigation in the history of the Landrum-Griffin Act.” The suit ended with seven Landrum-Griffin Act election law violations, and demanded the union financial transactions to be temporarily halted. Many lawsuits and over a year later, in September 1971, the official election suit went to trial, and in May of the next year, MFD won the suit, overturning the 1969 UMWA election. The hierarchy of the miners union was finally crippled, thanks to MFD, their lawyers, and two years of legal work.

The following year, Boyle was arrested for and convicted of the murder of Joseph, Margret and Charlotte Yablonski, which in itself was the biggest driving force behind the group's formation, according to Montrie. Throughout the Department of Labor's investigation of the 1969 election, police were attempting to uncover connections between the murders and union officials. They found the evidence they needed to convict Boyle in September 1973, where he was given three life sentences for the hiring of assassins to carry out the murder.

== Challenges with reform ==
After Boyle's presidency was voided, MFD had to work to construct a platform and choose candidates for the upcoming election to run against Boyle, and a convention was held in Wheeling, West Virginia to do so. At this convention, they chose Arnold Miller as the presidential candidate, due to his work as the president of a union local and as a leader in the BLA. The two main issues addressed at the convention to be included in the platform were relating to mine health and safety, and reform of the corrupt administration of the union. Eventually, MFD and Miller were able to assume control of the union, but more challenges were then presented. Miller had no prior experience with running a national union, and Fry believes he did not have the experience necessary to lead the UMWA. Additionally, the Miller administration identifies the corruption in the union as being so deeply rooted that they had to work on rebuilding the union before they could focus on issues such as health and safety, but there was disagreement among members of the administration on what kinds of reform efforts should take place.

The shift between administrations required some interference from the Department of Labor, to maintain that Boyle did not try to rig the ballots or intimidate voters. The transfer of power proved to be challenging, many pushing back against the reform. Gaventa says this resistance was mostly coming from Boyle and his administration, as well as the large number of Boyle supporters in UMWA District 19. District 19 had the highest concentration of Boyle supporters in the country. While Yablonski received 36% of the vote for the election in total, he only received 2% in the district. The four individuals first convicted in the murder of Yablonski were from the district, and were paid by Boyle from union funds to carry out the assassination. In the election of 1972, only 19% of the district voted for Miller, compared to 55% nationwide.

=== Outcomes ===
The use of the Landrum-Griffin Act proved to be a necessity for MFD's victory, and the mobilization of legal resources, mixed with the fire lit from the murder of Yablonski helped the insurgent miners overthrow the Boyle administration. The UMWA Constitution was overhauled, and more grassroots democracy was brought to the union. The Trbovich case provided precedent for other unions and social movement groups, ensuring the federal government intervenes to make sure all interests are represented equally.

== End of MFD ==
After MFD assumed control of the UMWA, many leaders from the organization took administrative positions in the union. Miller and his colleagues were concerned that the organization may pose a threat to union stability if allowed to continue, and they came to the decision to dismantle MFD.

== Legacy of Miners for Democracy ==
=== Mining safety ===
Mining safety for the Miners for Democracy was a core issue. A prime example of this was in 1969 when over 60,000 miners working in the coalfields went on strike. This strike during 1969 was during Yablonski's campaign for union president. Soon after that, Black lung disease became another crucial issue for miners. This disease sparked over 70,000 miners to go on a march to the capital of West Virginia. Yablonski saw an opportunity to help the united miners in the quest for safer working conditions. Yablonski pushed for cleaner air in the mines for miners, to reduce food contamination miners and their families were eating, and to reduce pollutants in the water. However, only a couple months after Yablonski's candidacy for union president, he was murdered. Yablonski's death sparked a movement in the miners who said that if coal could not be mined safely, it would not be mined at all. The miners knew that this could create job losses, and ensured that miners who lost their jobs would be given others by the union. The Miners for Democracy helped to pave the way for safer working conditions.

=== Legacy of MFD and current groups ===
The victory of the MFD was an important revolution for the lives of working people. The MFD paved the way for future workers rights, not only in the mining and steel industries, but for workers all around the country. The Miners for Democracy legacy was one that wanted to protect both the safety of miners, and the environment. One of the goals of the MFD was to preserve the environment, and to preserve jobs for miners at the same time. The MFD worked hard to keep mining jobs alive while trying to protect the environment. One way they did this was that they ensured that any miner who lost their jobs had other union jobs available for them. The MFD has inspired groups all around the world to continue their work in trying to protect energy workers, and the environment. Most recently, a group called UNIFOR based out of Canada called for an end to fracking. UNIFOR argued that people need to consider the health and safety of workers and the environment before fracking should continue. There also are dozens of states in the United States that have miner associations now that help to protect miners. Lastly, large agencies such as the Environmental protection agency in the USA, and the European environment agency in Europe have carried on trying to protect and preserve the environment just as the Miners for Democracy tried to do. The MFD has many legacies that followed after them. Environmental groups today are still carrying on the fight for mining safety, protecting the environment, and keeping mining jobs alive.

== Bibliography ==
- Hopkins, George W. (2010–12). "Union Reform and Labor Law: Miners For Democracy and the Use of the Landrum-Griffin Act". Journal of Labor Research.
- MacDowell, Laurel Sefton (2012). "The Elliot Lake Uranium Miners' Battle to Gain Occupational Health and Safety Improvements, 1950–1980". Labour / Le Travail. 69: 91–118. ISSN 0700-3862. JSTOR 24243927.
- "e-WV | Miners for Democracy". www.wvencyclopedia.org. Retrieved 2023-03-22.
- “"Miners for democracy and the planet". SocialistWorker.org. Retrieved 2023-03-24.
- Cowie, Jefferson (2010). Stayin' Alive : the 1970s and the Last Days of the Working Class. New Press. ISBN 978-1-56584-875-7. OCLC 768467752.
