= Betty Jean Hall =

American lawyer (1946–2024)

Betty Jean Hall (July 12, 1946 – August 16, 2024) was an American lawyer. She was a founder of the Coal Employment Project, which sued American coal companies to stop them from discriminating against women miners. Hall died on August 16, 2024, at the age of 78.
