= Kenneth Yablonski =

American attorney (1934–2002)

Kenneth Yablonski (February 13, 1934 – September 8, 2002) was a noted attorney with the firm of Yablonski, Costello and Leckie in Washington, Pennsylvania.

Kenneth Joseph Yablonski was born in 1934 to Joseph "Jock" and Ann (Huffman) Yablonski. He obtained a bachelor's degree from Waynesburg College in 1956 and received his J.D. from West Virginia University College of Law in 1959. His father was an activist and leader with the United Mine Workers of America (UMWA), and Yablonski began to represent him.

In 1961, he co-founded the firm of Yablonski, Costello and Leckie. He worked with the firm for the rest of his life.

In 1964, Yablonski won a precedent-setting case involving benefits to survivors of a mine disaster. A mine explosion occurred at U.S. Steel's Robena No. 3 Mine in Greene County, Pennsylvania on December 8, 1962. A total of 37 miners lost their lives. Yablonski won a court order forcing the local coroner to perform an inquest. This provided evidence that helped the families win expanded survivors' benefits from the Pennsylvania Workmen's Compensation Board.

== Father's union activism and murder ==
In the 1960s, Yablonski's father, Joseph A. "Jock" Yablonski, a long-time union representative, made a number of attempts to reform the United Mine Workers of America (UMWA). In December 1969, he ran for the presidency of UMWA against incumbent W. A. "Tough Tony" Boyle. During and after the election, which he lost, Jock Yablonski was represented and assisted by labor attorneys Joseph Rauh and Daniel Edelman, and sons Kenneth and Joseph "Chip" Yablonski, also both labor attorneys.

Jock Yablonski brought five lawsuits alleging that:

- Boyle and UMWA had denied him use of the union's mailing lists as provided for by law.
- He had been removed from his position as acting director of Labor's Non-Partisan League in retaliation for his candidacy.
- The UMW Journal was being used by Boyle as a campaign and propaganda mouthpiece.
- The UMWA had no rules for fair election, and had printed nearly 51,000 excess ballots, a sizeable percentage of union membership, which should have been destroyed.
- The UMWA had violated its fiduciary duties by spending union funds on Boyle's re-election.

After losing the election, and believing that Boyle had committed election fraud, Jock Yablonski sued to overturn the election and asked authorities to investigate these allegations.

On December 31, 1969, Jock Yablonski, his wife Margaret, and their 25-year-old daughter Charlotte were ambushed and shot dead by three assassins acting on the orders of Boyle, who had paid for them with union money Boyle had embezzled. Worried that he had not heard from his family since Christmas, Kenneth Yablonski and a friend drove to the Yablonski home in Clarksville, Pennsylvania on January 5, 1970, where they discovered the bodies of his slain family.

In the aftermath of his family's murders, Kenneth Yablonski joined with his brother and other miners to form the Miners for Democracy (MFD) in 1970, a reform movement within UMWA. Lou Antal, president of UMWA District 5, hired Kenneth Yablonski to represent him as he attempted to overturn his district's 1970 election results (which had been rigged by Boyle).

The joint Department of Labor and FBI investigation of the 1969 election resulted in its being overturned by a court in 1972. In December of that year, reform miner Arnold Miller unseated Boyle in an election, which was overseen by DOL to prevent fraud, and also saw other officials who had backed Boyle swept out of office.

== Continuing legal work ==
Although he later ended his relationship with Miller due to differences over Miller's leadership of the international union, Yablonski continued to serve as an attorney with his father's old District 5, advising on workers' compensation issues and acting as counsel until 1981.

Yablonski continued to represent individual miners in various cases throughout his life. In the 1980s, he won several black lung disease cases, overcoming employer objections to providing medical and financial benefits for stricken miners and their families.

In 1982, Yablonski won a precedent-setting Supreme Court case concerning attorney's fees.

United Steelworkers reformer Edward Sadlowski ran for president of the international union in 1977 and for District 31 president in 1973. He lost both times, and filed election fraud petitions with the United States Department of Labor (DOL). DOL found evidence of fraud and sued to overturn the 1973 election. The Steelworkers union settled the case out-of-court. Sadlowski then sued the union to recover his legal fees, incurred by Yablonski, Joseph Rauh and two others. On December 16, 1981, the U.S. Supreme Court agreed that the union must cover the cost of legal fees up until the time Sadlowski filed his DOL fraud claim. The award was a major victory for individuals who successfully sue their labor unions over corruption.

== Memberships ==
Kenneth Yablonski was a director of the Yablonski Memorial Clinic. The clinic was founded in 1955 by UMWA to bring health care to mining families in rural areas of Pennsylvania. Originally called the Centerville Clinic, it was renamed the Yablonski Memorial Clinic in honor of his father, Jock. Yablonski served as chairman of the board of directors of the clinic until his death.

== Personal life ==
In 1965, Yablonski married Shirley DiRocile (1935–2007). They had three sons, Kenneth, Mark and Joseph.

== Legacy ==
Kenneth Yablonski appears in documentary filmmaker Barbara Kopple's documentary, Harlan County, USA, which won the 1976 Academy Award for Documentary Feature. He is filmed talking about the 1970 funeral of his parents and sister:

"We [my brother and I] loved and admired our father. We respected him, and my brother and I would like to carry him to his final resting place. But we deem it proper to do otherwise. My brother Joseph with our cousins from my mother's family will carry our mother, and I with our cousins from my father's family will carry our sister Charlotte. We entrust our father to the coal miners, whom he loved so much."
