= Harlan County, USA =

1976 American documentary film

Harlan County USA
- The Criterion Collection DVD cover
- Directed by: Barbara Kopple
- Produced by: Barbara Kopple
- Cinematography: Kevin Keating; Hart Perry
- Edited by: Nancy Baker; Mary Lampson; Lora Hays
- Music by: Hazel Dickens; Merle Travis; David Morris
- Production company: Cabin Creek Films
- Distributed by: Cinema 5
- Release date: October 15, 1976 (New York Film Festival)
- Running time: 103 minutes
- Country: United States
- Language: English

Harlan County USA (variously written with and without a comma) is a 1976 American documentary film covering the "Brookside Strike", a 1973 effort of 180 coal miners and their wives against the Duke Power Company-owned Eastover Coal Company's Brookside Mine and Prep Plant in Harlan County, southeast Kentucky. It won the Academy Award for Best Documentary at the 49th Academy Awards.

The film was directed and produced by filmmaker Barbara Kopple, then early in her filmmaking career. A former VISTA volunteer, she had worked on other documentaries, especially as an advocate of workers' rights. It was met with critical acclaim and was featured in the 2022 Sight and Sound critics poll to determine the greatest films of all time.

== Synopsis ==
Kopple initially intended to make a film about Miners for Democracy and the attempt to unseat Tony Boyle as president of the UMWA. When miners at the Brookside Mine in Harlan County, Kentucky, went on strike against Duke Power Company in June 1973, Kopple went there to film the strike, which the UMWA had helped to organize. She decided it was the more compelling subject, so she switched the focus of her film. In all, she worked on the film for four years, including preparation and editing.

When Kopple and her cameraman Hart Perry showed up on the picket line, the locals were suspicious of their intentions. Rumors flew that a "hippie crew from New York" was sniffing around the strike. When she confronted a striker who told people not to talk to her, she was told: "Girl, you gotta tell people here what you're doin'."

Kopple and her crew spent years with the families depicted in the film, documenting the dire straits they encountered while striking for safer working conditions, fair labor practices, and decent wages. She followed them to picket in front of the Stock Exchange in New York City, filming interviews with people affected by black lung disease, and miners being shot at while striking.

The company insisted on having a no-strike clause in the proposed new contract. The miners were concerned that accepting such a provision would limit their ability to influence local working conditions. This sticking point became moot when, a few years after the strike, the UMWA folded the agreement won by this group of workers into a global contract.

Rather than using narration to tell the story, Kopple chose to film the words and actions of the people themselves. For example, when the strike breakers and others hired by the company show up early in the film—the strikers call them "gun thugs"—the company people tried to keep their guns hidden from the camera. As the strike dragged on for nearly a year, both sides eventually openly brandished their weapons. Kopple felt it was important to continue filming (or pretend to, even when they were out of film) because the presence of the crew and staff support seemed to help keep the violence down.

Kopple provided facts and statistics about the companies and the workers. She notes that Duke Power Company's profits increased 170 percent in a single year. Meanwhile, the striking miners, many of whom are living in squalid conditions without utilities or running water, were offered a 4% pay increase, at a time when the estimated cost of living increase was 7% for that same year.

Joseph Yablonski was a passionate, populistic union representative who was loved by many of the miners. Yablonski had challenged W.A. "Tony" Boyle for the presidency of the UMWA in 1969, but lost in an election widely viewed as corrupt. Later that year, Yablonski and his family were found murdered in their home. Early in the film, Boyle is shown in good health. Later, after he was convicted of giving $20,000 to another union executive council member to hire the killers of Yablonski and his wife, Boyle appears frail, sickly and using a wheelchair; he was carried up the courthouse steps to face sentencing.

Almost a full year into the strike, miner Lawrence Jones was fatally shot during a scuffle. Jones was young, well liked, had a 16-year-old wife, and an infant baby. In the documentary, his mother can be seen breaking down during his funeral, wailing and being carried away by male attendees. The strikers and management finally agreed to come to the bargaining table after his death.

Lois Scott, a leading woman in the mining community, is shown playing a major role in galvanizing the people in support of the strike. Several times, she is seen publicly chastising those she feels have been absent from the picket lines. In one scene, Scott pulls a pistol from her bra.

== Production ==
Signs in support of the Brookside strike

=== Interviews ===
- Norman Yarborough - Eastover Mining president
- Houston Elmore - UMW organizer
- Phil Sparks - UMW staff
- John Corcoran - Consolidation Coal president
- John O'Leary - former US Bureau of Mines director
- Donald Rasmussen - Black Lung Clinic, West Virginia
- Dr. Hawley Wells Jr.
- Tom Williams - Boyle campaigner
- Harry Patrick - UMW secretary-treasurer
- William E. Simon - U.S. Secretary of Treasury

=== Music ===
The music used in Harlan County USA was considered integral to conveying the culture of the miners. It reflected the culture of the people of Harlan County and showed the power of folk music that was a living part of their culture. Their stories were often told through the songs.

The music used in the film:

- "Dark as a Dungeon", written by Merle Travis, sung by David Morris
- "Forty-Two Years", written and sung by Nimrod Workman, instrumental by Kenny Kosek
- "Come All You Coal Miners", written and sung by Sarah Ogan Gunning
- "Mannington", written by Hazel Dickens, sung by David Morris
- "Black Lung", written and sung by Hazel Dickens
- "Cold Blooded Murder", written and sung by Hazel Dickens
- "Miners Life", traditional instrumental performed by David Morris's Band
- "Which Side Are You On", written and sung by Florence Reece (as Florence Reese), additional lyrics by Joshua Waletzky (as Josh Waletzky)
- "This Little Light of Mine", traditional, sung by Bill Worthington
- "Coal Tattoo", by Billy Edd Wheeler with additional lyrics, and sung by David Morris
- "Trouble Among Yearlings", instrumental by Country Cookin'
- "Lone Prairie", by Roscoe Holcomb and Wade Ward
- "They'll Never Keep Us Down", written and sung by Hazel Dickens, accompanied by Lamar Grier, John Katarakis, John Otsuka, and Gary Henderson

== Reception ==
=== Critical response ===
Gary Arnold of The Washington Post praised the film, saying that Kopple "has emerged with a stirring, revealing testament to the courage, tenacity and dignity of Appalachian men and women whose livelihood depends on coal mining. At their best Kopple and photographer Hart Perry bear unassuming, expressive witness to the experiences, aspirations and abiding grievances of the Brookside miners and their wives, who organized auxiliary strike actions."

When the film was re-released in 2006, critic Roger Ebert gave the film four out of four stars, writing "The film retains all of its power, in the story of a miners' strike in Kentucky where the company employed armed goons to escort scabs into the mines, and the most effective picketers were the miners' wives -- articulate, indomitable, courageous. It contains a famous scene where guns are fired at the strikers in the darkness before dawn, and Kopple and her cameraman are knocked down and beaten."

Film critic Dennis Schwartz liked the documentary, yet found flaw in it providing only one point of view. He described the film as "One of the better and more rousing labor strike films that calls attention to class war in America, though it doesn't offer enough analysis or balance on the issues (it sees the struggle solely through the miners' eyes)...The film does a good job chronicling the plight of the miners and telling their personal stories in a moving way, and the meaningful catchy coal mining songs add to the emotional impact of the historical event. Hazel Dickens's folk song lyrics of 'United we stand, divided we fall' and Florence Reece's lyrics for "Which Side Are You On?" give one the full-flavor of the miners' mood and the union fervor sweeping the mining community in the black mountains of Appalachia."

On the review aggregator site Rotten Tomatoes, the film received a 100% approval rating based on 23 reviews.

=== Awards ===
Wins

- Academy Awards: Academy Award for Best Documentary Feature, 1976
- Los Angeles Film Critics Association: Special Award, 1977
- Belgian Film Critics Association: Grand Prix, 1979

=== Other distinctions ===
- In 1990, the film was selected for preservation in the United States National Film Registry by the Library of Congress as being "culturally, historically, or aesthetically significant."
- In 2014, Sight and Sound published a list of Greatest Documentaries of All Time, and Harlan County, USA was ranked 24th, tied with two other movies.
- In the 2022 Sight and Sound Poll of the Greatest Films of All Time, the film was ranked in 225th place, tied with 17 other films including Star Wars and Intolerance.

== Preservation ==
Harlan County, USA was preserved by the Academy Film Archive, in conjunction with New York Women in Film & Television, in 2004.

== Extras on Criterion Collection ==
In the film's 2004 Criterion Collection special feature, The Making of Harlan County, USA, associate director Anne Lewis compares Scott to Women's Liberation activists. Jerry Johnson, one of the striking Eastover miners, attributes the conclusion of the strike to the presence of Kopple and her film crew: "The cameras probably saved a bunch of shooting. I don't think we'd have won it without the film crew. If the film crew hadn't been sympathetic to our cause, we would've lost. Thank God for them; thank God they're on our side."

== Notes ==
In a 2015 interview with Variety, Kopple was asked if she was in danger while working on this film. She reveals that the head strikebreaker, Basil Collins, wanted to hire someone to shoot her; however, the most dangerous incidents were the acts of violence by the mine owners against the miners. She said that the mine owners would hire "local prisoners to beat people up, [shoot] at houses. The people had to line their walls with mattresses."

== See also ==
- Harlan County War
- 2019 Harlan County coal miners protest
- Labor history
