= W. A. Boyle =

American labor leader and convicted murderer (1904–1985)

11th President of the United Mine Workers
- In office 1963–1972
- Preceded by: Thomas Kennedy
- Succeeded by: Arnold Miller

Personal details
- Born: William Anthony Boyle; December 1, 1904 Bald Butte, Montana
- Died: May 31, 1985 (aged 80) Wilkes-Barre, Pennsylvania
- Occupation: Miner; Labor leader
- Known for: President, United Mine Workers of America; ordering the murder of Jock Yablonski
- Nickname(s): "Tough Tony" Boyle; Tony Boyle

William Anthony "Tough Tony" Boyle (December 1, 1904 – May 31, 1985) was an American miner, union leader, and convicted murder-for-hire conspirator. He became president of the United Mine Workers of America union in 1963, serving until 1972. Boyle was convicted in 1974 of charges of conspiracy in the murder of opponent Joseph A. Yablonski, Yablonski's wife Margaret, and their daughter Charlotte, on New Year's Eve, December 31, 1969. After an appeal, his conviction and sentence were upheld at a second trial; he was sentenced to three life terms and died while still incarcerated.

Yablonski had opposed Boyle for some time, arguing for more democratic representation among the locals, and had run against him in a bitter presidency election of the UMWA earlier in December, which Boyle won. Yablonski charged that fraud had been committed, asking for a Department of Labor investigation, and also filing five lawsuits against the union on specific related civil charges.

== Early years ==
Boyle was born in a gold mining camp in Bald Butte, Montana (about two miles southwest of Marysville), in 1904 to James and Catherine (Mallin) Boyle. His father was a miner. The Boyle family was of Irish descent, and several generations of Boyles had worked as miners in England and Scotland. Boyle attended public schools in Montana and Idaho before graduating from high school. He went to work in the mines alongside his father. Shortly thereafter, Boyle's father died from tuberculosis, a lung disease often associated with mining, or exacerbated by its conditions.

== Marriage ==
Boyle married Ethel Williams in 1928; they had a daughter, Antoinette.

== Career ==
Boyle joined the United Mine Workers of America (UMWA) soon after going to work in the mines. He was appointed president of District 27 (which covers Montana) and served in that capacity until 1948. During World War II, Boyle served on several government wartime production boards, and on the Montana State Unemployment Compensation Commission.

In 1948, UMWA president John L. Lewis named Boyle as his assistant in the UMWA. He served until 1960, acting as Lewis' chief trouble-shooter and the union's chief administrator. Lewis simultaneously appointed him director of UMWA District 50 and regional director of the Congress of Industrial Organizations (CIO) for four Western states.

== Presidency of UMWA ==
Boyle was elected vice president of UMWA in 1960. That same year, Lewis retired and 73-year-old Thomas Kennedy assumed leadership of the union. Kennedy had been vice president since 1947. Although Lewis favored Boyle as his successor, Kennedy was well liked and well known. Kennedy was in failing health, however, and Boyle took over many of the president's duties. In November 1962, Kennedy became too frail and ill to continue his duties. Boyle was named acting-president. Kennedy died on January 19, 1963. Boyle was elected president shortly thereafter, obviously Lewis's handpicked choice.

From the beginning of his tenure, Boyle faced significant opposition from rank-and-file miners and UMWA leaders. Miners' attitudes about their union had changed. Miners wanted greater democracy and more local autonomy for their local unions. There was a widespread belief that Boyle was more concerned with protecting mine owners' interests than those of his members. Grievances filed by the union often took months—sometimes years—to resolve, lending credence to the critics' claim. Wildcat strikes occurred as local unions, despairing of UMWA assistance, sought to resolve local disputes with walkouts.

== Yablonski challenge and murder ==
In 1969, Joseph "Jock" Yablonski challenged Boyle for the presidency of UMWA. Yablonski had been president of UMWA District 5 (an appointed position) until Boyle had removed him in 1965. In an election widely seen as corrupt, Boyle defeated Yablonski in the election held on December 9 by a margin of nearly two-to-one (80,577 to 46,073). Although Boyle won, the election was the first time since 1920 that the incumbent had less than 80 percent or more of the vote, or that there was any opposition at all. Observers expected the union to make changes in response to the growing insurgency movement and demands for change.

Yablonski conceded the election, but on December 18, 1969, asked the United States Department of Labor (DOL) to investigate the election for fraud. He also initiated five lawsuits against UMWA in federal court.

On December 31, 1969, three killers shot Yablonski, his wife, Margaret, and his 25-year-old daughter, Charlotte, as they slept in the Yablonski home in Clarksville, Pennsylvania. The bodies were discovered on January 5, 1970, by Yablonski's eldest son, Kenneth.

Boyle was found to have ordered Yablonski's death months earlier, on June 23, 1969, after a meeting with his opponent at UMWA headquarters had degenerated into a screaming match. In September 1969, UMWA executive council member Albert Pass received $20,000 (equivalent to $176,000 in 2025) from Boyle (who had embezzled the money from union funds) to hire assassins to kill Yablonski. Paul Gilly, an out-of-work house painter and son-in-law of a minor UMWA official, and two drifters, Aubran Martin and Claude Vealey, agreed to do the job. Pass arranged for the murder to be postponed until after the election, to avoid suspicion falling on Boyle.

== Overturned election and defeat ==
Yablonski's murder acted as a catalyst for the federal investigation already requested. On January 8, 1970, Yablonski's attorney requested an immediate investigation of the 1969 election by DOL. The Department of Labor had taken no action on Yablonski's complaints in the brief time since his December request. After the murders, Labor Secretary George P. Shultz assigned 230 investigators to the UMWA investigation.

The Labor Management Reporting and Disclosure Act (LMRDA) of 1959 regulates the internal affairs of labor unions, requiring regular secret-ballot elections for local union offices and providing for federal investigation of election fraud or impropriety. DOL is authorized under the act to sue in federal court to have the election overturned. By 1970, however, only three international union elections had been overturned by the courts.

Meanwhile, a reform group, Miners for Democracy (MFD), had formed in April 1970 while the DOL investigation continued. Its members included most of the miners who belonged to the West Virginia Black Lung Association and many of Yablonski's supporters and campaign staff. The chief organizers of Miners for Democracy included Yablonski's sons, Ken and Joseph (known as "Chip"), both labor attorneys; Mike Trbovich, a union leader, and others.

DOL filed suit in federal court in 1971 to overturn the 1969 UMWA election. On May 1, 1972, Judge William B. Bryant threw out the results of the 1969 UMWA international union elections. Bryant scheduled a new election to be held over the first eight days of December 1972. Additionally, Bryant agreed that DOL should oversee the election, to ensure fairness.

Over the weekend of May 26 to May 28, 1972, MFD delegates gathered in Wheeling, West Virginia, nominated Arnold Miller, a former miner and leader of a black-lung organization, as their candidate for the presidency of UMWA.

On December 22, 1972, the Labor Department certified Miller as UMWA's next president. The vote was 70,373 for Miller and 56,334 for Boyle. Miller was the first candidate to defeat an incumbent president in UMWA history, and the first native West Virginian to lead the union.

== Convictions and death ==
In early March 1971, Boyle was indicted for embezzling $49,250 in union funds (equivalent to $391,530 in 2025) to make illegal campaign contributions in the 1968 presidential race. He was convicted in December 1973 to a three-year sentence and imprisoned at the federal penitentiary in Springfield, Missouri.

National attention had been riveted on the investigations into the conspiracy to murder Yablonski. A nationwide FBI investigation produced sufficient evidence to charge three Cleveland-area residents with conspiracy to murder Yablonski. Through Grand Jury proceedings, a series of three conspiracy indictments were returned, charging five individuals. The investigation was conducted by U.S. Attorney Robert B. Krupansky, with Assistant U.S. Attorney Robert Jones. Finally documentation and witnesses led to Boyle: on September 6, 1973, Boyle was arrested on first degree murder charges in the deaths of Jock Yablonski and his family. That month, Boyle attempted suicide but survived. His trial lasted from 25 March until April 11, 1974, when he was convicted. He was sentenced to three consecutive terms of life in prison.

On January 28, 1977, the Supreme Court of Pennsylvania overturned Boyle's conviction and ordered that he be given a new trial. The court found that the trial judge had improperly refused to allow a government auditor to testify. Boyle's attorneys said that the auditor's testimony could have exonerated Boyle.

On January 16, 1978, Boyle's murder retrial was set to resume. He had been convicted, but the Pennsylvania state Supreme Court had set aside the convictions on grounds Boyle was denied the right to present a complete defense.

Boyle was tried a second time for the Yablonski murders and found guilty on February 18, 1978. Boyle filed a third appeal to overturn his conviction in July 1979, but the motion was denied. Boyle served his murder sentence at State Correctional Institution – Dallas in Luzerne County, Pennsylvania. He suffered from a number of stomach and heart ailments in his final years and was repeatedly hospitalized. He had a stroke in 1983. He died at a hospital in Wilkes-Barre, Pennsylvania, on May 31, 1985, aged 80.

== In popular culture ==
Barbara Kopple's 1976 documentary Harlan County, USA included a segment on Yablonski's murder and its aftermath. It also includes the song "Cold Blooded Murder" (also known as "The Yablonski Murder"), sung by Hazel Dickens.

The murders were also portrayed in a 1986 HBO television movie, Act of Vengeance. Charles Bronson (a native of Ehrenfeld, in the western Pennsylvania mining region) portrayed Yablonski and Wilford Brimley played Boyle.

== Sources ==
- "Boyle's Turn at Last", Time. April 15, 1974.
- Clark, Paul F. The Miners' Fight for Democracy: Arnold Miller and the Reform of the United Mine Workers. Ithaca, New York: ILR Press, 1981. ISBN 0-87546-086-0
- "The Fall of Tony Boyle." Time. September 17, 1973.
- Franklin, Ben A. "Arnold Miller is Dead at 62; Former Mine Workers' President", New York Times. July 12, 1985.
- Hume, Brit. Death and the Mines: Rebellion and Murder in the United Mine Workers, New York: Grossman, 1971. ISBN 0-670-26105-X
- Lewis, Arthur H. Murder By Contract: The People v. 'Tough Tony' Boyle, New York: MacMillan Publishing, 1975. ISBN 0-02-570520-2
- "More Trouble for Tony", Time, March 15, 1972.
- "Oral History Interview with Dr. Donald Rasmussen" B.L. Dotson-Lewis, interviewer. Nicholas County Schools, Summersville, West Virginia. March 1, 2004.
- Smith, J.Y. "Former UMW Chief Tony Boyle Dies at 83." Washington Post. June 1, 1985.
- "Vindication for Jock Yablonski", Time, March 16, 1970.
- "W.A. 'Tony' Boyle, Ex-Union President Convicted of Murder", Chicago Tribune. June 1, 1985.
- Wiater, John. "Top MFD Position Goes to Miller", Wheeling Intelligencer. May 29, 1972.
- "The Yablonski Contract." Time. May 15, 1972.

Trade union offices
| Preceded by Thomas Kennedy | Vice-President of the United Mine Workers of America; 1960–1963 | Succeeded by Raymond Lewis |
| Preceded by Thomas Kennedy | President of the United Mine Workers of America; 1963 - 1972 | Succeeded by Arnold Miller |
