= Joseph "Chip" Yablonski =

American attorney

Joseph Albert "Chip" Yablonski, Jr. (born 1941) is an attorney in Washington, D.C. For much of his career, he was a partner in the firm Yablonski, Both and Edelman; the firm dissolved in 2006. Yablonski is now a solo practitioner in the Law Offices of Joseph A. Yablonski.

Chip Yablonski was born in 1941 to Joseph "Jock" and Margaret Yablonski. He obtained his bachelor's degree from Saint Vincent College. He was awarded a J.D. from the University of Pittsburgh School of Law in 1965 (he was managing editor of the law review).

His father was a leader with the UMWA who was assassinated in December 1969, along with his wife and daughter. In 1970 Yablonski, his brother Ken, regional leader Mike Trbovich, and other union supporters founded Miners for Democracy, seeking reform in the union.

Yablonski clerked for Chief Judge Austin Staley on the United States Court of Appeals for the Third Circuit. Later, he worked as an attorney for the National Labor Relations Board.

== Father's union activism ==
In the 1960s, Yablonski's father, Jock, made a number of attempts to reform the United Mine Workers of America (UMWA). Jock Yablonski ran for the presidency of UMWA in December 1969 against W. A. Boyle and lost in an election riven with fraud.

Jock Yablonski asked for an investigation by the Department of Labor. He also filed suit against the union to overturn the elections, with the assistance of labor attorneys Joseph Rauh and Daniel Edelman, and sons Kenneth Yablonski and Chip Yablonski. Jock Yablonski's five suits alleged that: Boyle and UMWA had denied him use of the union's mailing lists as provided for by law, he had been removed from his position as acting director of Labor's Non-Partisan League in retaliation for his candidacy, the UMW Journal was being used by Boyle as a campaign and propaganda mouthpiece, UMWA had no rules for fair elections and printed nearly 51,000 excess ballots which should be destroyed, and UMWA had violated its fiduciary duties by spending union funds on Boyle's re-election.

Three weeks after the balloting ended, Jock Yablonski, his wife and their 25-year-old daughter Charlotte were murdered by three assassins hired by Boyle and paid for with embezzled union money.

In the aftermath of his family's murders, Chip Yablonski joined with his brother Ken and other miners to form Miners for Democracy (MFD), a reform movement within UMWA.

The 1969 election was overturned in 1972 after an investigation by the United States Department of Labor] and the FBI. Reform candidate, miner Arnold Miller, unseated Boyle in an election held in December 1972. Miller appointed Chip Yablonski as general counsel for the UMWA.

In 1975, Chip Yablonski resigned from the United Mine Workers. With Daniel Edelman, he formed a private practice, Yablonski Both and Edelman.

== Continuing legal work ==
For nearly 30 years, Yablonski has served as outside counsel for the National Football League Players Association (NFLPA), as well as other labor groups and union activists. In 1992, he won a class action lawsuit in which a federal jury awarded $10 million in damages to former National Football League (NFL) reserve players. The jury found that the NFL had unfairly used its monopoly power to keep their salaries low.

In 1988, he represented Jerry Tucker, a militant leader in the United Auto Workers. Yablonski filed a suit charging fraud in an election which Tucker had lost in Region 5. The election was investigated and eventually overturned by the Department of Labor in court. As a result of Yablonski's efforts, a re-run election was held in 1988, with supervision by DOL. Jerry Tucker was elected Director of UAW Region 5.

Yablonski is also a successful civil trial lawyer. In his case Kolstad v. American Dental Association, 527 U.S. 526 (1999), the Supreme Court of the United States ruled to liberalize the eligibility rules so that additional numbers of plaintiffs may recover punitive damages under Title VII and the Americans with Disabilities Act.

== Memberships ==
Yablonski is a member of the District of Columbia, Pennsylvania and Maryland bars, as well as the bars of the U.S. Supreme Court and almost every U.S. Court of Appeal.

He is a member of the Association of Trial Lawyers, and sits on the board of directors of the David A. Clarke School of Law Foundation. Yablonski is also a former board member of the National Bank of Washington, which at one time was owned by the United Mine Workers.

== Representation in other media ==
Yablonski appears in parts of filmmaker Barbara Kopple's documentary, Harlan County, USA, which won the 1976 Academy Award for Documentary Feature. It refers to events years after the murders of his parents and sister, although these are also mentioned. Yablonski holds a press release, saying

"The events in Washington, Pennsylvania show that murder is as institutionalized within the UMWA as it is in the mafia. The order to kill, to kill the whole family if necessary, was as routinely transmitted and carried out as an order to call a strike or settle agreements."

In a further segment, he is seen speaking to a congregation of coal miners, advocating for Miners for Democracy, a reform group. He urges district representatives to unite in order "to throw Boyle and his crowd out, for once and for all," referring to the December 1972 election, in which Boyle was defeated.
