= Leewood, West Virginia =

- Unincorporated community
- Location within West Virginia Location within the United States
- Coordinates: 38°04′03″N 81°26′59″W
- Country: United States
- State: West Virginia
- County: Kanawha
- Elevation: 883 ft (269 m)
- Time zone: UTC-5 (Eastern (EST))
  - Summer (DST): UTC-4 (EDT)
- Area codes: 304 & 681
- GNIS feature ID: 1554938

Leewood is an unincorporated community in Kanawha County, West Virginia, United States. Leewood is 7 miles (11 km) northeast of Sylvester along Cabin Creek.
