= Joseph Yablonski =

American labor leader (1910–1969)

- Born: Joseph Albert Yablonski; March 3, 1910; Pittsburgh, Pennsylvania, U.S.
- Died: December 31, 1969 (aged 59); Clarksville, Pennsylvania, U.S.
- Occupation: Labor leader

Joseph Albert "Jock" Yablonski (March 3, 1910 – December 31, 1969) was an American labor leader in the United Mine Workers in the 1950s and 1960s known for seeking reform in the union and better working conditions for miners. In 1969 he challenged Tony Boyle for the presidency of the international union and was defeated. He asked for a Department of Labor (DOL) investigation, charging a fraudulent election. In addition, Yablonski filed a lawsuit against the UMWA on five different charges related to fraud. On New Year's Eve, Yablonski, his wife, and his 25-year-old daughter were murdered, fatally shot at home by three gunmen found to have been hired on orders of Tony Boyle.

A total of seven persons were convicted of murder and conspiracy to commit murder; two of the assassins were sentenced to death for first-degree murder. DOL completed its investigation, aided by the FBI, and won a suit to overturn the 1969 election by 1972. A new election was held in December of that year and a reform candidate elected, defeating Boyle. Boyle was indicted in 1973 for the three Yablonski murders; he was convicted in 1974 and received three life sentences. The union made important reforms.

== Early life, marriages and union career ==
Joseph Yablonski, called "Jock", was born in Pittsburgh, Pennsylvania, on March 3, 1910, as the son of Polish immigrants, After attending public schools, Yablonski began working in the mines as a boy, joining his father in this industry.

After his father was killed in a mine explosion, Yablonski became active in the United Mine Workers and began to advocate for better working conditions. He was first elected to union office in 1934. In 1940, Yablonski was elected as a representative to the international executive board. In 1958 he was appointed president of UMW District 5.

As a young man Yablonski married Ann Marie Huffman. Their son Kenneth J. Yablonski was born in 1934. After Yablonski and Huffman were divorced, he married Margaret Rita Wasicek, an amateur playwright. They had two children, Joseph "Chip" and Charlotte Yablonski. Both sons became labor attorneys, representing their father in his union activities and later in private practices. Charlotte became a social worker in Clarksville, Pennsylvania, where her family lived. She took leave to work in 1969 on her father's campaign for the UMWA presidency.

Yablonski clashed with Tony Boyle, who was elected president of the UMW in 1963, over how the union should be run. He believed that Boyle did not adequately represent the miners and was too cozy with the mine owners. In 1965, Boyle removed Yablonski as president of District 5 (under changes enacted by Boyle, district presidents were appointed by him, rather than being elected by union members of their district, giving him more control).

In May 1969 Yablonski announced his candidacy for president of the union in the election to be held later that year. As early as June, Boyle was reportedly discussing the need to kill his opponent.

== UMWA presidential candidacy ==
The United Mine Workers was in turmoil by 1969. Legendary UMWA president John L. Lewis had retired in 1960. His successor, Thomas Kennedy, died in 1963. From retirement, Lewis hand-picked Boyle for the UMWA presidency. A Montana miner, Boyle was as autocratic and bullying as Lewis, but not as well-liked.

From the beginning of his administration Boyle faced significant opposition from rank-and-file miners and UMWA leaders. Miners' attitudes about their union had also changed. Miners wanted greater democracy and more autonomy for their local unions. There was also a widespread belief that Boyle was more concerned with protecting mine owners' interests than those of his members. Grievances filed by the union often took months—sometimes years—to resolve, lending credence to the critics' claim. Wildcat strikes occurred as local unions, despairing of UMWA assistance, sought to resolve local disputes with walkouts.

In 1969 Yablonski challenged Boyle for the presidency of UMWA. He was the first anti-administration insurgent candidate in 40 years. In an election widely seen as corrupt, Boyle beat Yablonski in the election held on December 9, by a margin of nearly two-to-one (80,577 to 46,073). Yablonski conceded the election.

On December 18, 1969, he asked the United States Department of Labor (DOL) to investigate the election for fraud. He also initiated five civil lawsuits against UMWA in federal court, on related matters. He alleged that: Boyle and UMWA had denied him use of the union's mailing lists as provided for by law, he had been removed from his position as acting director of Labor's Non-Partisan League in retaliation for his candidacy, the UMW Journal was being used by Boyle as a campaign and propaganda mouthpiece, UMWA had no rules for fair elections, and had printed nearly 51,000 excess ballots which should have been destroyed; and UMWA had violated its fiduciary duties by spending union funds on Boyle's reelection. These charges and their resolution are outlined in the civil case Kenneth J. Yablonski and Joseph A. Yablonski v. United Mine Workers of America et al., 466 F.2d 424 (August 3, 1972), which his sons carried to the end.

== Murder ==
On December 31, 1969, three hitmen fatally shot Yablonski, his wife Margaret, and his 25-year-old daughter Charlotte, as they slept in the Yablonski home in Clarksville, Pennsylvania. The bodies were discovered on January 5, 1970, by one of Yablonski's sons, Kenneth.

An investigation found that the killings had been ordered by Boyle, who had demanded Yablonski's death on June 23, 1969, after a meeting with Yablonski at UMWA headquarters degenerated into a shouting match. In September 1969, UMWA executive council member Albert Pass received $20,000 from Boyle (who had embezzled the money from union funds) to hire gunmen to kill Yablonski. He hired Paul Eugene Gilly (September 5, 1932 – July 6, 2021), an out-of-work house painter and son-in-law of Silous Huddleston, a minor UMWA official, and two drifters, Aubran Wayne "Buddy" Martin (May 7, 1948 – March 12, 1991) and Claude Edward Vealey (July 9, 1943 – January 31, 1999).

The murder was ordered postponed until after the election, however, to avoid suspicion falling on Boyle. After three aborted attempts to murder Yablonski, the killers completed the assassinations, deciding to kill everyone in the house. They left so many fingerprints behind that the police identified and captured them within three days.

A few hours after Yablonski's funeral, several of the miners who had supported Yablonski met in the basement of the church where the memorial service was held. They met with attorney Joseph Rauh and drew up plans to establish a reform caucus within the United Mine Workers.

The day after the bodies of the Yablonskis were discovered, 20,000 miners in West Virginia walked off the job in a one-day strike, protesting against Boyle, who they believed was responsible for the murders.

== Aftermath of Yablonski's murder ==
On January 8, 1970, Yablonski's attorney waived the right to further internal review of the election by the union and requested an immediate investigation by DOL of the 1969 union presidential election. On January 17, 1972, the United States Supreme Court granted Mike Trbovich, a 51-year-old coal mine shuttle car operator and union member from District 5 (Yablonski's district), permission to intervene in the DOL suit as a complainant, which kept Yablonski's election fraud suit alive. Labor Secretary George P. Shultz assigned 230 investigators to the UMWA investigation and Attorney General Mitchell ordered the FBI to join the murder inquiry.

The Labor Management Reporting and Disclosure Act (LMRDA) of 1959 regulates the internal affairs of labor unions, requiring regular secret-ballot elections for local union offices and providing for federal investigation of election fraud or impropriety. DOL is authorized under the act to sue in federal court to have the election overturned. By 1970, however, only three international union elections had been overturned by the courts.

Gilly, Martin and Vealey were arrested days after the assassinations and indicted for Yablonski's death. All were convicted of first-degree murder. Gilly and Vealey were sentenced to death (the death sentences were later reduced to life in prison due to Furman v. Georgia); Martin avoided execution by pleading guilty and turning state's evidence.

Eventually investigators arrested Paul Gilly's wife, Annette Lucy Gilly; her father Silous Huddleston; Albert Edward Pass (30 June 1920 - 7 April 2002; who had given the money to pay the conspirators for murder) and Pass's wife. All were convicted of murder and conspiracy to commit murder, in trials extending into 1973. (Both Annette Gilly and her father Silous Huddleston pleaded guilty in 1972, receiving life sentences to avoid the death penalty.)

Miners for Democracy (MFD) formed in April 1970, while the DOL investigation of the 1969 election continued. Its members included most of the miners who belonged to the West Virginia Black Lung Association and many of Yablonski's supporters and former campaign staff. MFD's support was strongest in southwestern Pennsylvania, eastern Ohio, and the panhandle and northern portions of West Virginia, but MFD supporters existed in nearly all affiliates. The chief organizers of Miners for Democracy included Yablonski's sons, Joseph (known as "Chip") and Ken, Mike Trbovich, and other union supporters.

The DOL filed suit in federal court in 1971 to overturn the 1969 UMWA election. After several lengthy delays, the suit went to trial on September 12, 1971. On May 1, 1972, Judge William Bryant threw out the results of the 1969 UMWA international union elections.

Bryant scheduled a new election to be held during the first eight days of December 1972. In addition, Bryant agreed that the DOL should oversee the election to ensure fairness.

On May 28, 1972, MFD nominated Arnold Miller, a miner from West Virginia who challenged Boyle for the presidency, based on the need for black lung legislation to protect the miners.

Balloting for the next UMWA president began on December 1, 1972. Balloting ended on December 9, and Miller was declared the victor on December 15. The Labor Department certified Miller as UMWA's next president on December 22. The vote was 70,373 for Miller and 56,334 for Boyle.

Two of the convicted murderers had accused Boyle of masterminding and funding the assassination plot. The murder investigation and confessions of other conspirators revealed the financial and other trails leading back to Boyle. In April 1973 Boyle was indicted on three counts of murder; he was convicted in April 1974. He was sentenced to three consecutive life terms in prison, where he died in 1985.

== Honors and legacy ==
In 1973 Yablonski posthumously received the Samuel S. Beard Award for Greatest Public Service by an Individual 35 Years or Under, made annually by Jefferson Awards.

In 1995 the Pennsylvania Historical and Museum Commission installed a historical marker in California, Pennsylvania commemorating Yablonski's life and work.

The Joseph A. Yablonski Memorial Clinic in Fredericktown, PA, one of the Centerville Health Clinics, was renamed to honor Yablonski; it was originally the Union Miners Building, Inc., when it opened in 1955.

== Portrayal in popular culture ==
Barbara Kopple's 1976 documentary Harlan County USA included a segment on Yablonski's murder and its aftermath. It also includes the song "Cold Blooded Murder" (also known as "The Yablonski Murder"), sung by Hazel Dickens. The complex problem of the coal mining industry and the distribution of profits between the corporation and its labor force is covered well in this documentary.

John Sayles's novel Union Dues (1977) is a fictional account of miners fighting for proper union representation in 1969. The Boyle-Yablonski dispute is a sub-plot which several characters mention, expressing their opinions of unions and corruption.

The 1986 HBO television movie Act of Vengeance was about the union struggle and the murders. Wilford Brimley played Boyle and Charles Bronson (a native of Ehrenfeld in the western Pennsylvania mining region) portrayed Yablonski.

An episode of FBI: The Untold Stories was devoted to this case.

Mark A Bradley's 2020 book Blood Runs Coal - The Yablonski Murders and the Battle for the United Mine Workers of America covers Yablonski's presidential campaign, the murders and the subsequent murder trials. Cillian Murphy will star in and produce a film based on Bradley's book for Universal Pictures.

Robert K. Tanenbaum's 2023 book Coal Country Killing is about the murders and subsequent trials from the point of view of the special prosecutor appointed for the cases.

Coal Survivor, a 2025 eight-episode series of the podcast Shadow Kingdom, hosted by Nicolo Majnoni. It features interviews with Chip Yablonski and many figures involved in the labor movement that sprung up following the murder of Jock Yablonski.

== Bibliography ==
- "Boyle Is Given Three Life Terms In '69 Murder of the Yablonskis." Associated Press. September 12, 1975.
- "The Fall of Tony Boyle." Time. September 17, 1973.
- Flint, Jerry M. "Murder Charges Filed." New York Times. January 23, 1970.
- Franklin, Ben A. "Angry U.M.W. Insurgent Arnold Ray Miller." New York Times. May 30, 1972.
- Franklin, Ben A. "Boyle Claims Victory In Mine Union Race." New York Times. December 11, 1969.
- Franklin, Ben A. "Boyle Is Accused In Yablonski Case." New York Times. March 10, 1973.
- Franklin, Ben A. "Boyle Is Implicated By Yablonski Killer." New York Times. March 14, 1973.
- Franklin, Ben A. "Boyle Is Ousted By Miners' Votes After Long Fight." New York Times. December 16, 1972.
- Franklin, Ben A. "Confession Given in Yablonski Case." New York Times. May 4, 1972.
- Franklin, Ben A. "Dissident Miners Seek Funds Here." New York Times. November 15, 1970.
- Franklin, Ben A. "Inquiry Is Ordered Into Mine Election." New York Times. January 9, 1970.
- Franklin, Ben A. "Jury Finds Boyle Guilty In 3 Yablonski Murders." New York Times. April 12, 1974.
- Franklin, Ben A. "Mine Union Change Likely After Vote." New York Times. December 14, 1969.
- Franklin, Ben A. "More Miners Protest Slayings." New York Times. January 8, 1970.
- Franklin, Ben A. "Officials Certify Miners' Election." New York Times. December 21, 1972.
- Franklin, Ben A. "Rank and File Rebellion Stirs in Mine Union, Posing Threat to Lewis Legacy." New York Times. June 13, 1969.
- Franklin, Ben A. "Reform Miners Select Candidate to Run Against Boyle." New York Times. May 29, 1972.
- Franklin, Ben A. "3 Held in Yablonski Deaths." New York Times. January 22, 1970.
- Franklin, Ben A. "U.M.W. Head Faces Suit On Election." New York Times. September 12, 1971.
- Franklin, Ben A. "U.M.W.'s Spending Detailed in Suit." New York Times. January 24, 1971.
- Franklin, Ben A. "U.S. Action Urged By U.M.W. Faction." New York Times. October 4, 1970.
- Franklin, Ben A. "U.S. Again Delays Mine Union Trial." New York Times. May 30, 1971.
- Franklin, Ben A. "Wife of Suspect in Yablonski Case Is Indicted by U.S. Jury as Member of Plot to Kill Union Rebel." New York Times. February 6, 1970.
- Franklin, Ben A. "Yablonski Inquiry Reported to Focus On a Sum of Money." New York Times. January 24, 1970.
- "Grand Jury Is Checking Financial Records of a U.M.W. Local in Tennessee." United Press International. February 4, 1970.
- Lewis, Arthur H. Murder By Contract: The People v. 'Tough Tony' Boyle. New York: MacMillan Publishing, 1975. ISBN 0-02-570520-2
- Lockard, Duane. Coal: A Memoir and Critique. Charlottesville, Va.: University of Virginia Press, 1998. ISBN 0-8139-1784-0.
- "Loser Asks Inquiry Into Mine Election." Associated Press. December 12, 1969.
- "Mitchell Orders F.B.I. to Join Inquiry Into Yablonski Slayings." New York Times. January 7, 1970.
- "Mystery Lingers in Yablonski Case." New York Times. March 5, 1972.
- "News of the Screen." New York Times. September 16, 1973.
- "Oral History Interview with Dr. Donald Rasmussen." B.L. Dotson-Lewis, interviewer. Nicholas County Schools, Summersville, West Virginia. March 1, 2004.
- "Pass Guilty in Yablonski Deaths." New York Times. June 20, 1973.
- Peterson, Bill. "The Tragedy of the Miners: Arnold Miller and the Disarray of the Reform Movement." Washington Post. January 16, 1977.
- Schenider, Steve. "This Time Around, Bronson Portrays the Victim." New York Times. April 20, 1986.
- Vasquez, Juan M. "Overseer Named for U.M.W. Voting." New York Times. June 21, 1972.
- Vasquez, Juan M. "U.M.W. Election of Boyle Is Upset by Federal Judge." New York Times. May 2, 1972.
- Vecsey, George. "Mine Workers Begin Balloting." New York Times. December 2, 1972.
- "Vindication for Jock Yablonski." Time. March 16, 1970.
- "The Yablonski Contract." Time. May 15, 1972.
- "Yablonski Defendant Pleads Guilty to Escape Chair." New York Times. April 12, 1972.
- "Yablonski Defendant Sentenced To Death for Three Murders." New York Times. November 14, 1971.
- "Yablonski Friends Say Suspect Visited Slain Man's Home Before Killing." New York Times. January 23, 1970.
