= Archives of Appalachia =

Archive in Tennessee, US

Archives of Appaalachia
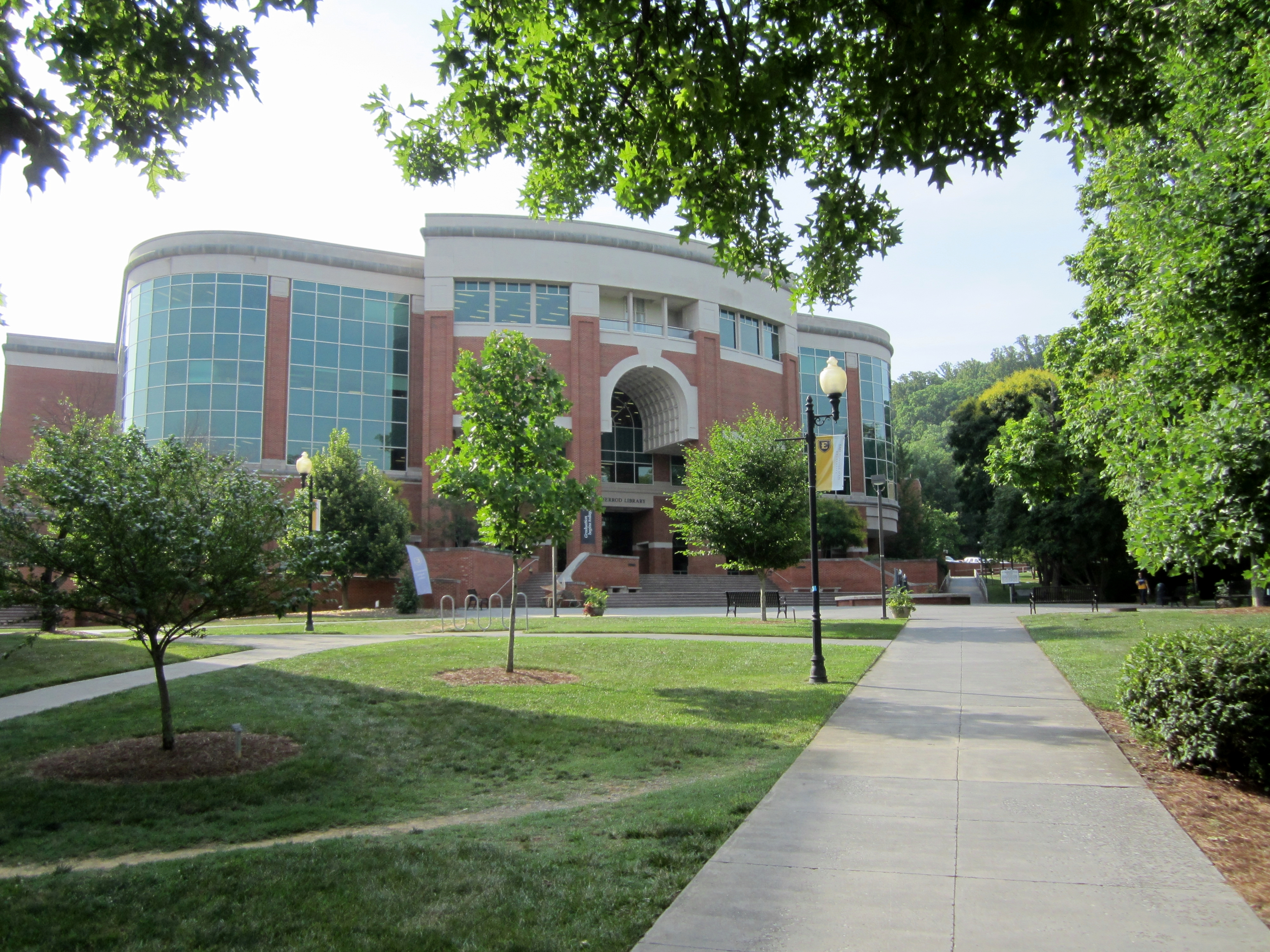
- Sherrod Library, on the 4th floor of which are the Archives of Appalachia
- 36.3026°N 82.3657°W
- Location: East Tennessee State University
- Established: 2 September 1978

Other information
- Website: www.etsu.edu/cas/cass/archives/

The Archives of Appalachia are located on the campus of East Tennessee State University (ETSU) in Johnson City, Tennessee. Containing books, rare manuscripts, photographs, and audio and moving-image recordings, the archives serve as a resource for scholarly and creative projects dealing with life in southern Appalachia.

== Early history ==
The Archives of Appalachia at East Tennessee State University (ETSU) opened on September 1, 1978, located on the first floor of what is now known as Nicks Hall. Created as part of the Institute of Appalachian Affairs by Arthur H. DeRosier, Jr., newly appointed President of ETSU, its mission was to coordinate research and public service relating to the sociological, political, economic and cultural aspects of life in southern Appalachia. Richard M. Kesner served as the first Director from 1978 to 1981. Early collections included the Washington County Court Records 1777–1950, the East Tennessee Education Association Papers, the LeRoy Reeves Papers, and the B. Carroll Reece Papers. Under Kesner's direction, the archives added other valuable collections, including the Carolina, Clinchfield and Ohio Railway Records, the Magnet Mills Collection, and the Broadside Television Collection.

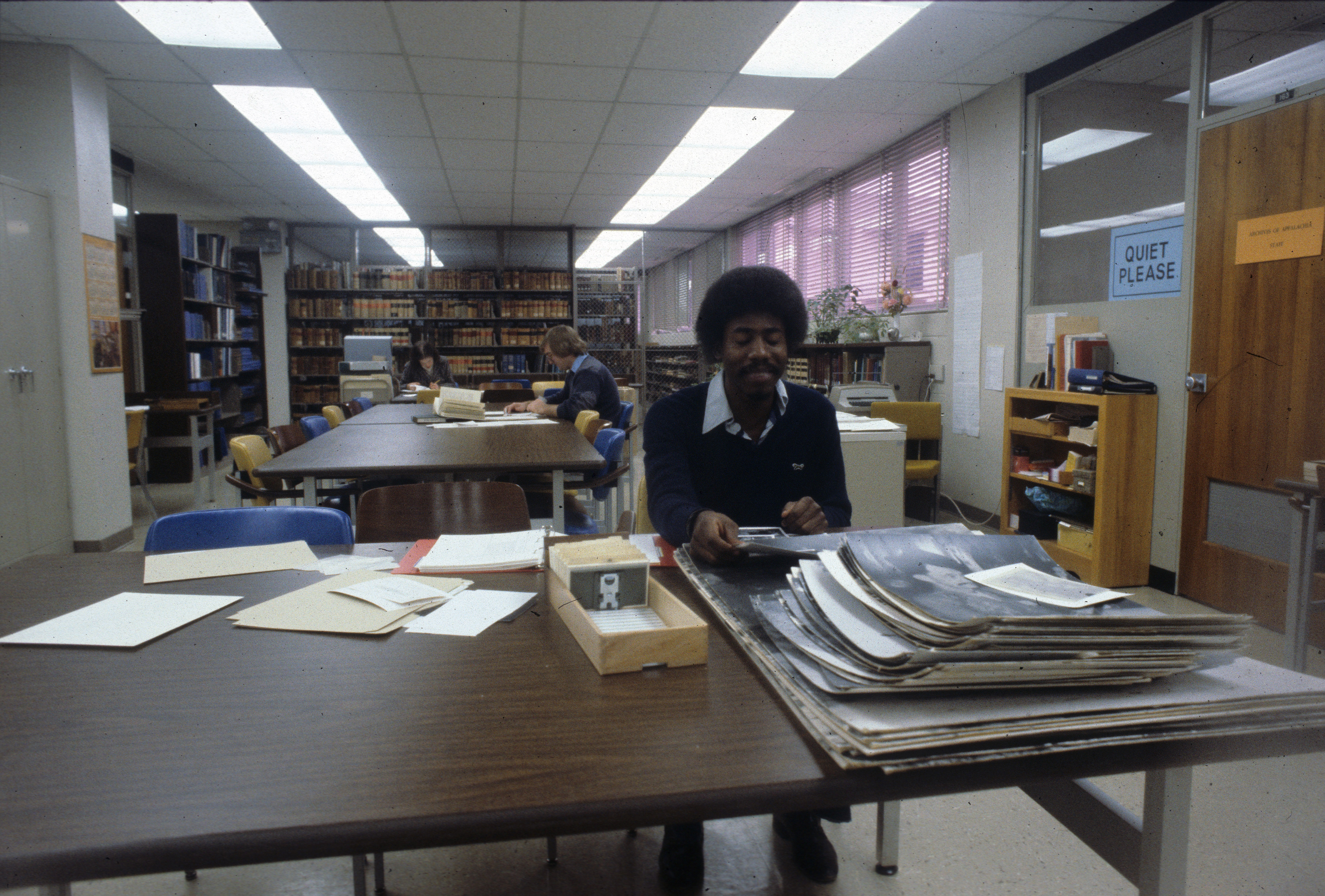
Archives of Appalachia in Nicks Hall (Old Sherrod Library)

From the archives' beginning, institutional and public outreach played a vital role in achieving notable goals. Grants in 1979 and 1981 from the Tennessee Endowment for the Humanities and the National Endowment for the Humanities allowed the archives to develop the Appalachian Outreach Program, through which it produced nine slide-tape presentations about the region for teachers and community groups. The archives developed teaching packets to accompany the presentations, which included transcripts, bibliographies, and suggested classroom activities for public school students.

After the departure of Richard Kesner, Ellen Garrison served as Director from July 1982 to January 1987. In 1982, the Tennessee Committee for the Humanities awarded a grant for the archives to develop a series of three radio programs titled "Tennessee's Mountain Heritage". Based on material from the archives' collections, the series was broadcast over the WETS radio station in May 1983. Under Garrison's direction, the archives implemented a computerized access system in 1986 and hired Norma (Myers) Thomas as Technical Services Archivist. Garrison resigned as director of the archives in January 1987.

== Center for Excellence in Appalachian Studies and Services ==
In 1984, as a part of the state's Better Schools Program passed by the 1984 legislature, ETSU inaugurated the Center of Excellence for Appalachian Studies and Services (CASS). CASS included the Institute for Appalachians Affairs, the B. Carroll Reece Museum and the Archives of Appalachia. The archives acquired additional space when the medical library moved out of Sherrod Library. The additional space allowed for a conference room, map and over-sized material room, as well as additional storage space. In 1986, in recognition of ETSU's 75th anniversary, the archives produced a series of exhibits on ETSU's history and helped prepare a time capsule that was deposited in one of the globe columns at the campus amphitheater. The time capsule was opened during the ETSU's 100th anniversary in 2011.

In 1997, the administrative responsibility of the archives, previously shared between the Center for Appalachian Studies and the University Library, was changed to the center only, and the archives were restructured. Previously known as the Archives and Special Collections, with subdivisions of Archives of Appalachia, University Archives, and Special Collections, the name was officially changed to the Archives of Appalachia, consisting of three units – Appalachian Manuscript Collections, University Archives, and Special Collections.

In 1999, the Archives of Appalachia received a grant from the National Academy of Recording Arts and Sciences to preserve selected recordings and to develop a radio series drawing on the materials in these collections. The one-hour weekly radio series, titled "From the Archives", was broadcast on WETS public radio station and featured performances of a range of traditional music. In 2000, the archives were awarded a grant by the National Historical Publications and Records Commission to preserve original and rare recordings in the Barnicle-Cadle, Bernard Rousseau, and Broadside Television collections and make them more accessible to researchers. As part of an effort to make its collections more accessible, the archives posted all of its finding aids online by 2000.

== Types of collections ==
- Appalachian Collections
- University Archives
- Special Collections
