= Black Lung Benefits Act of 1972 =

US Federal Labour Law

- Long title: Joint resolution to amend the provisions of the Federal Coal Mine Health and Safety Act of 1969 to extend black lung benefits to orphans whose fathers die of pneumoconiosis, and for other purposes.
- Enacted by: the 92nd United States Congress
- Effective: May 19, 1972

Citations
- Public law: Pub. L. 92–303
- Statutes at Large: 86 Stat. 150

Codification
- Acts amended: Federal Coal Mine Health and Safety Act of 1969
- Titles amended: 30 U.S.C.: Mineral Lands and Mining
- U.S.C. sections amended: 30 U.S.C. ch. 22, subch. IV §§ 921–925; 30 U.S.C. ch. 22, subch. IV §§ 931–945

Legislative history
- Introduced in the House as H.R. 9212 by Carl D. Perkins (D–KY) on August 5, 1971; Committee consideration by U.S. House Education & Labor; Passed the House on November 10, 1971 (311-79); Passed the Senate on April 17, 1972 (73-0); Reported by the joint conference committee on April 19, 1972; agreed to by the Senate on May 4,1972 (Agreed) and by the House on May 10, 1972 (275-122); Signed into law by President Richard M. Nixon on May 19, 1972

The Black Lung Benefits Act (BLBA) is a U.S. federal law which provides monthly payments and medical benefits to coal miners totally disabled from pneumoconiosis (black lung disease) arising from employment in or around the nation's coal mines. The law also provides monthly benefits to a miner's dependent survivors if pneumoconiosis caused or hastened the miner's death.

== History ==
In 1952, Alabama became the first state to provide compensation for coal workers' pneumoconiosis.

In 1969, the United Mine Workers convinced the United States Congress to enact the landmark Federal Coal Mine Health and Safety Act which provided compensation for miners suffering from Black Lung Disease. Arnold Miller (1923–1985) a miner and long time labor activist played a big role in the struggle for this legislation.

== Adjudication and processing ==
Claims may be submitted to any of nine district offices of the Division of Coal Mine Workers' Compensation of the Department of Labor. The employment and medical history of the claimant are examined, including a complete pulmonary evaluation paid for by the Black Lung Disability Trust Fund. There may be a rebuttable presumption that pneumoconiosis resulted from such employment for miners long-term employed at one or more coal mines. Right of rebuttal is offered to the relevant coal mine operator, and final determination is made by the director of the examining district office.

The fairness of these administrative proceedings, however, has recently been called into question in light of an increasing lack of resources for miners to contest claims accompanied by a resurgence in black lung disease.

== Benefits and medical services ==
Present and former coal miners, other workers who have been exposed to coal dust, and their surviving dependents may apply for medical and monthly financial benefits under the Act. The program provides for diagnostic testing to verify the presence of black lung disease and degree of associated disability. Benefits may include a monthly stipend, as well as such medical services as prescription drug coverage, hospitalization coverage, durable medical equipment, and outpatient therapy.

Note: Benefits do not include Residence costs (room and board) for nursing homes or skilled nursing facilities. Miners who become disabled to the point of needing the services of a nursing home or skilled nursing facilities will have to resort to their own insurance or private funds to pay for these services.

Payments are made by the operator of the mine most recently employing an affected worker or from the Black Lung Disability Trust Fund. Payments and benefits are not considered taxable income.

== Black Lung Disability Trust Fund ==
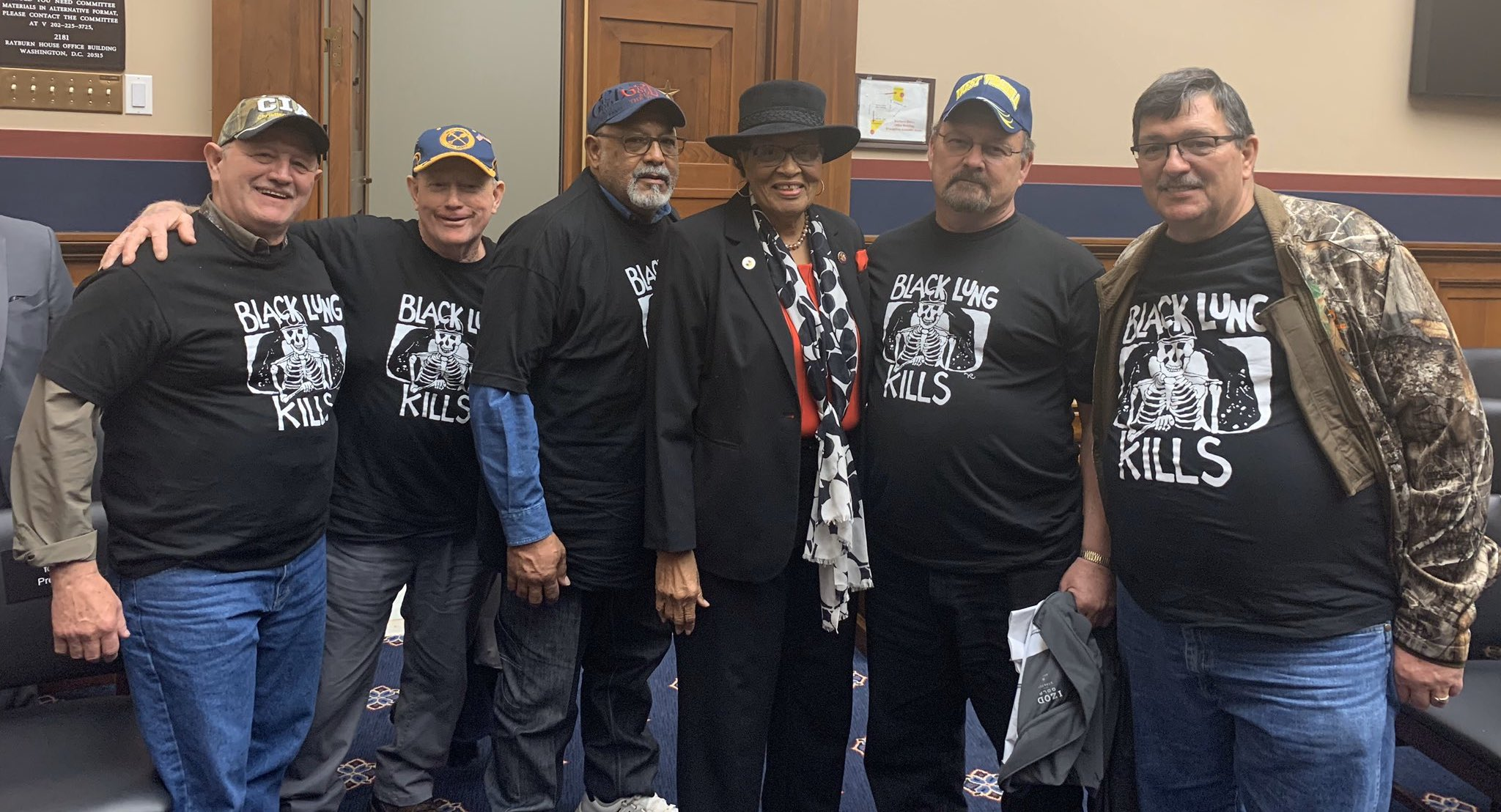
Coal miners meeting with Congresswoman Alma Adams about the Black Lung Disability Trust Fund in 2020.

The Black Lung Benefits Act established a government trust fund to pay for the benefits, financed by an excise tax on coal. Until the end of 2018 the tax was $1.10 per ton for coal from subsurface mines and $0.55 per ton for surface mines, limited to a maximum of 4.4% of the coal’s selling price. Starting January 1, 2019 the rate was reduced to $0.50 per ton for coal from subsurface mines and $0.25 per ton for surface mines, limited to 2% of selling price that was established in the original Black Lung Benefits Revenue Act of 1977 rather than the updated rates that was used to pay the fund that was established in the Consolidated Omnibus Budget Reconciliation Act of 1985. Coal produced for export is not taxed. The Trust Fund runs a deficit, financed by borrowing from the treasury. Congress has in the past forgiven portions the debt, which reached a maximum of $10.5 billion in 2008 and stood at $4.3 billion in 2018. With the 2019 cut in excise tax rates, the General Accounting Office estimates the debt will reach $15.4 billion in 2050. In 2022, the excise tax rates was restored back to its 1985 rates as a permanent extension as a provision in the Inflation Reduction Act of 2022 rather than used as short-term, one year extensions Congress had passed in 2019 & 2020 but not in 2021.

== See also ==
- Coalworker's pneumoconiosis
