= Clarksville, Pennsylvania =

Borough in Pennsylvania, US

- Borough
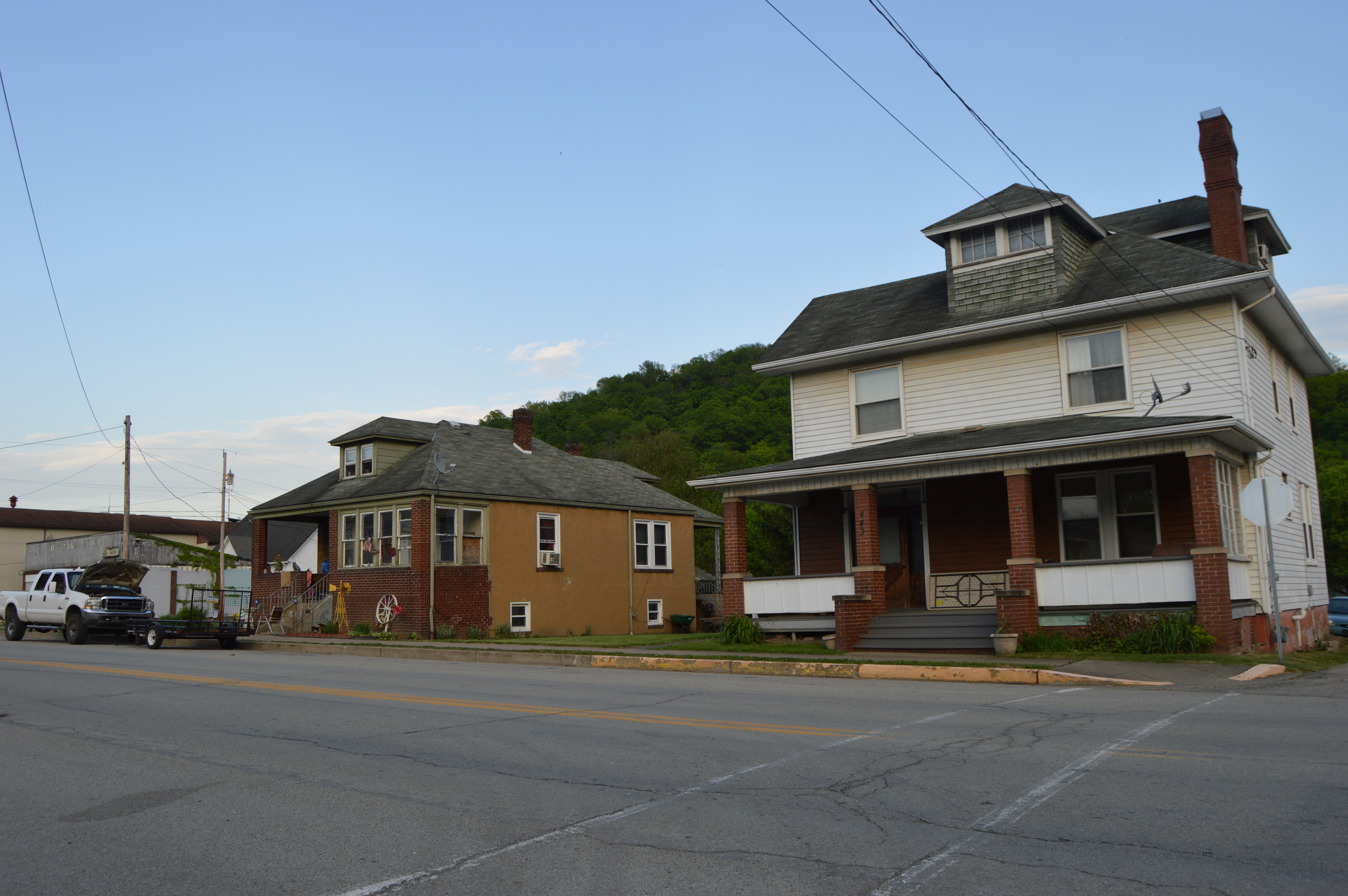
- Houses on Center Street

- Location of Clarksville in Greene County, Pennsylvania.

- Location within Pennsylvania Location within the United States
- Coordinates: 39°58′27″N 80°2′41″W
- Country: United States
- State: Pennsylvania
- County: Greene
- Established: 1769

Government
  - Body: Clarksville Borough Council
  - Mayor: David Teagarden (Democrat)

Area
  - Total: 0.097 sq mi (0.25 km^{2})
  - Land: 0.097 sq mi (0.25 km^{2})
  - Water: 0 sq mi (0.00 km^{2})
- Elevation: 805 ft (245 m)

Population (2020)
  - Total: 194
  - Density: 2,086.3/sq mi (805.52/km^{2})
- Time zone: UTC-5 (EST)
  - Summer (DST): UTC-4 (EDT)
- Area code: 724

Clarksville is a borough in Greene County, Pennsylvania, United States. The population was 194 at the 2020 census.

== Geography ==
Clarksville is located in the northeastern corner of Greene County at 39°58′27″N 80°2′41″W (39.974170, -80.044833), at the confluence of Tenmile Creek with its South Fork. The borough is bordered by Morgan Township to the west, Jefferson Township to the south and east across the South Fork Tenmile Creek, and East Bethlehem Township in Washington County to the north across Tenmile Creek. Clarksville is 3 miles (5 km) southwest of Millsboro, where Tenmile Creek joins the Monongahela River.

An adjacent part of East Bethlehem Township, Washington County adjacent to the borough is often colloquially considered part of Clarksville.

According to the United States Census Bureau, Clarksville has a total area of 0.10 square miles (0.25 km^{2}), all land.

== Demographics ==
Historical population
Census	Pop.	Note	%±
1880	205		—
1910	208		—
1920	234		12.5%
1930	457		95.3%
1940	428		−6.3%
1950	428		0.0%
1960	332		−22.4%
1970	269		−19.0%
1980	251		−6.7%
1990	211		−15.9%
2000	234		10.9%
2010	230		−1.7%
2020	203		−11.7%
2025 (est.)	183	▼	−9.9%

As of the census of 2000, there were 234 people, 78 households, and 52 families residing in the borough. The population density was 2,387.1 inhabitants per square mile (921.7/km^{2}). There were 90 housing units at an average density of 918.1 per square mile (354.5/km^{2}). The racial makeup of the borough was 96.15% White, 1.28% African American, 0.43% Native American and 2.14% Pacific Islander. Hispanic or Latino of any race were 0.43% of the population.

There were 78 households, out of which 26.9% had children under the age of 18 living with them, 55.1% were married couples living together, 11.5% had a female householder with no husband present, and 33.3% were non-families. 28.2% of all households were made up of individuals, and 17.9% had someone living alone who was 65 years of age or older. The average household size was 2.51 and the average family size was 3.12.

In the borough the population was spread out, with 20.5% under the age of 18, 7.3% from 18 to 24, 21.4% from 25 to 44, 23.1% from 45 to 64, and 27.8% who were 65 years of age or older. The median age was 46 years. For every 100 females there were 93.4 males. For every 100 females age 18 and over, there were 84.2 males.

The median income for a household in the borough was $25,833, and the median income for a family was $26,429. Males had a median income of $26,667 versus $31,250 for females. The per capita income for the borough was $13,720. About 7.1% of families and 7.2% of the population were below the poverty line, including 7.4% of those under the age of eighteen and 5.4% of those sixty five or over.

== Notable people ==
- Joseph Yablonski, United Mine Workers labor leader
- Ron Nyswaner, American screenwriter and film director
- Angela Green-Montgomery, LGBTQI public health activist and advocate
