= List of centenarians (activists, nonprofit leaders and philanthropists) =

The following is a list of centenarians – specifically, people who became famous as activists, nonprofit leaders and philanthropists – known for reasons other than their longevity. For more lists, see lists of centenarians.

All supercentenarians (above 110 years old)
All semi-supercentenarians are between 105 and 109 years old
Living

Name	Lifespan	Age	Reason for Notability
Thérèse Adloff	1904–2005	101	French Resistance activist and humanitarian
Janie Allan	1868–1968	100	Scottish women's rights activist and suffragette
Encarnación Alzona	1895–2001	105	Filipino suffragette, historian and author
Albert Jean Amateau	1889–1996	106	Turkish rabbi, businessman, lawyer and social activist
Ruth Apilado	1908–2021	113	American civil rights activist, newspaper editor and novelist, founder of America's Intercultural Magazine
Melchora Aquino	1812–1919	107	Filipino revolutionary
Nettie Craig Asberry	1865–1968	103	African-American activist, co-founder of the Tacoma, Washington NAACP
Brooke Astor	1902–2007	105	American socialite and philanthropist
Annie Ball	1869–1970	100	English social reformer
Edith Ballantyne	1922–2025	102	Czech-Canadian activist
George Barasch	1910–2013	102	American labor union leader
Manuel G. Batshaw	1915–2016	101	Canadian social worker
William Sperry Beinecke	1914–2018	103	American philanthropist
Herman Benson	1915–2020	104	American machinist and trade union reformer; founded the Association for Union Democracy
Timuel Black	1918–2021	102	American civil rights activist
Grace Lee Boggs	1915–2015	100	American author and social activist
Hetty Bower	1905–2013	108	British political activist
Amelia Boynton Robinson	1905–2015	110	American civil rights activist
Catherine Bramwell-Booth	1883–1987	104	British Salvation Army officer
Sybil Brand	1899/1902–2004	104 or 101	American philanthropist and activist
Elza Brandeisz	1907–2018	110	Hungarian humanitarian, Righteous Among the Nations
Dorothy Burnham	1915–	111	American civil rights activist and educator
Dame Edith Burnside	1889–1992	102 or 103	Australian charity worker and philanthropist
Catherine Caradja	1893–1993	100	Romanian aristocrat and philanthropist
Fannie Cobb Carter	1872–1973	100	American integration activist
Aracy de Carvalho	1908–2011	102	Brazilian humanitarian
María Teresa Castillo	1908–2012	103	Venezuelan activist and journalist
Naseem Mirza Changezi	1910–2018	108	Indian independence activist
Clara Charf	1925–2025	100	Brazilian political activist
Guy Charmot	1914–2019	104	French military doctor and resistance member during World War II
Alfred H. Chesser	1914–2016	102	American labor union leader
Leonora Cohen	1873–1978	105	British suffragette
Annie Lee Cooper	1910–2010	100	African-American civil rights activist
John Craighead	1916–2016	100	American conservationist
Sir Naim Dangoor	1914–2015	101	Iraqi-born British philanthropist
Kathryn Wasserman Davis	1907–2013	106	American philanthropist
Dobri Dobrev	1914–2018	103	Bulgarian ascetic and philanthropist
H. S. Doreswamy	1918–2021	103	Indian independence activist, freedom fighter, and journalist
Marjory Stoneman Douglas	1890–1998	108	American women's suffrage advocate, conservationist, journalist, and author
Bill DuBois Sr.	1916–2017	100	American farmer and philanthropist
Muriel Duckworth	1908–2009	100	Canadian pacifist, feminist and social activist
Charles Duguid	1884–1986	102	Australian activist for Aboriginal rights
Margaret Dunning	1910–2015	104	American philanthropist
Hilda Eisen	1917–2017	100	Polish-American business woman, philanthropist and Holocaust survivor
Hallie Ford	1905–2007	102	American business woman and philanthropist
Yann Fouéré	1910–2011	101	Breton nationalist
Ruth May Fox	1853–1958	104	American women's rights activist
Frankie Muse Freeman	1916–2018	101	American civil rights attorney
Victor Fuentealba	1922–2024	101	American labor union leader
Marian Fuks	1914–2022	108	Polish historian, director of the Jewish Historical Institute
Margaret Gardiner	1904–2005	100	British art collector and political activist
Andrée Geulen	1921–2022	100	Belgian Jewish rights and activist
Miep Gies	1909–2010	100	Austrian-born Dutch humanitarian
Annie Glenn	1920–2020	100	American disability rights activist
Henrietta Greville	1861–1964	102	Australian labour organiser
Lina Haag	1907–2012	105	German World War II resistance fighter and anti-Fascist activist
Doris Haddock	1910–2010	100	American political activist
John Hampton	1907–2010	103	American co-founder of Toys for Tots
Alice Seeley Harris	1870–1970	100	British activist and photographer
Ralph Hauenstein	1912–2016	103	American philanthropist
Fumiko Hayashida	1911–2014	103	American activist
Drue Heinz	1915–2018	103	British-born American actress, arts patron and philanthropist
Judith Hemmendinger	1923–2024	100	German-born Israeli researcher
Margaret Holmes	1909–2009	100	Australian peace activist
Robert R. Holt	1917–2024	106	American psychologist
Lucy Somerville Howorth	1895–1997	102	American feminist activist
Teresa Hsu	1898–2011	113	Chinese-born Singaporean social worker
Johnnie Jones	1919–2022	102	American WWII veteran, civil rights activist and politician
Shidzue Katō	1897–2001	104	Japanese feminist and politician
Rose Kennedy	1890–1995	104	American socialite, philanthropist and the matriarch of the Kennedy family
Ida B. Kinney	1904–2009	104	American civil rights activist
Jeannette Laot	1925–2025	100	French trade unionist (CFDT), women's rights activist (MLF) and presidential advisor (to François Mitterrand)
Erik Sture Larre	1914–2014	100	Norwegian resistance member during World War II
Bob Le Sueur	1920–2022	102	British humanitarian
Evelyn Lett	1896–1999	102	Canadian women's rights pioneer
Max Levitas	1915–2018	103	Irish-born Scottish communist and labour activist
Jessie Lichauco	1912–2021	109	Cuba-born American-Filipino philanthropist and charity worker
Paul Moyer Limbert	1897–1998	101	American Secretary General of the YMCA
Georges Loinger	1910–2018	108	French resistance member during World War II
K. Madhavan	1915–2016	101	Indian independence activist
Mahlagha Mallah	1917–2021	104	Iranian environmentalist and librarian, founder of the Women's Society Against Environmental Pollution
Lambert Mascarenhas	1914–2021	106	Indian independence activist, journalist (The Navhind Times, Goa Today), and writer
Enolia McMillan	1904–2006	102	American educator, community leader and civil rights activist, president of NAACP
Rachel Lambert Mellon	1910–2014	103	American philanthropist, art collector and horticulturalist
María Asunción Milá	1919-2026	107	Spanish human rights activist and aristocrat
Meda Mládková	1919–2022	102	Czech philanthropist and art collector
Captain Sir Tom Moore	1920–2021	100	British army officer and fundraiser
Mary Morello	1923–2026	102	American free speech activist
Dame Elisabeth Murdoch	1909–2012	103	Australian philanthropist
Margaret Murie	1902–2003	101	American conservationist
Josefina Napravilová	1914–2014	100	Czech humanitarian activist
Scott Nearing	1883–1983	100	American radical economist
Anton Nilson	1887–1989	101	Swedish political activist
Sanzō Nosaka	1892–1993	101	Japanese politician
Poornima Arvind Pakvasa	1913–2016	102	Indian social worker
Margaret Papandreou	1923–2026	102	American-Greek women's rights activist, writer, and ex-wife of former prime minister of Greece Andreas Papandreou
Everett Parker	1913–2015	102	American civil rights activist
Andrée Peel	1905–2010	105	French Resistance member during World War II
Ángeles Flórez Peón	1918–2024	105	Spanish activist and writer
Wanda Półtawska	1921–2023	101	Polish Holocaust survivor and activist
Veikko Porkkala	1908–2009	100	Finnish trade union leader and communist activist
Kayyar Kinhanna Rai	1915–2015	100	Indian independence activist
Gerald Ratner	1913–2014	100	American lawyer and philanthropist
Nittoor Srinivasa Rau	1903–2004	100	Indian independence activist and jurist
Naomi Sewell Richardson	1892–1993	100	American educator and suffragist
Jeanne Robert	1914–2017	103	French Resistance leader
Milton Rogovin	1909–2011	101	American documentary photographer
Isabel Rosado	1907–2015	107	Puerto Rican independence activist and social worker
Dovey Johnson Roundtree	1914–2018	104	American civil rights activist
Frederick J. Schlink	1891–1995	103	American co-founder of Consumers' Research
Floyd Schmoe	1895–2001	105	American peace activist and naturalist
Margarete Schütte-Lihotzky	1897–2000	102	Austrian architect and political activist
Camille Senon	1925–2025	100	French resistance fighter and trade unionist
Henri Simon	1922–2024	102	French Marxist militant
Bernice Tannenbaum	1913–2015	101	American Zionist and feminist
Rosa Tarlovsky de Roisinblit	1919–2025	106	Argentine human rights activist
Lucille Times	1921–2021	100	American civil rights activist
Elsie Tu	1913–2015	102	British-born Hong Kong social activist
Thomas Wyatt Turner	1877–1978	101	American civil rights activist, biologist and educator
Millie Dunn Veasey	1918–2018	100	American civil rights activist
Marie Wadley	1906–2009	102	Native American activist and historian
Rachel Mellon Walton	1899–2006	107	American philanthropist and donor
Mary Warburg	1908–2009	100	American philanthropist
Edgar Wayburn	1906–2010	103	American environmentalist
Mathias Wenda	1920–2025	104	West Papuan separatist and activist
Irvin F. Westheimer	1879–1980	101	American businessman, banker and philanthropist
Jamye Coleman Williams	1918–2022	103	American activist
Sir Nicholas Winton	1909–2015	106	British humanitarian
Hazel Wolf	1898–2000	101	American environmental activist and civil rights campaigner
Rose Wolfe	1916–2016	100	Canadian social worker and philanthropist
