= Jane LaTour =

American labor activist (1946–2023)

- LaTour in 2015
- Born: Jane Ellen Latour; May 3, 1946; Burlington, Vermont, U.S.
- Died: April 3, 2023 (aged 76); New York City, U.S.
- Employer(s): Association for Union Democracy; Public Employee Press
- Organization: New York Labor History Association
- Notable work: Sisters in the Brotherhoods; Backroom Bargaining

Jane Ellen LaTour (May 3, 1946 – April 3, 2023) was an American labor activist, educator, and journalist in New York City who advocated union democracy and documented the role of women in traditionally male-dominated trades. (Note: Born with the surname "Latour", she started capitalizing the "T" after becoming a professional writer.) She was the author of Sisters in the Brotherhoods: Working Women Organizing for Equality in New York City. A two-time recipient of the Mary Heaton Vorse Award for labor journalism, she was an associate editor for Public Employee Press, the publication of District 37 of AFSCME, and contributed to numerous other publications. For many years, she was the director of the Women's Project for the Association for Union Democracy, and served on the boards of the New York Labor History Association and the Women's Press Collective.

== Early life and education ==
Born on May 3, 1946, in Burlington, Vermont, Jane LaTour was the third of five siblings in a Roman Catholic family. Her parents were Ransom Latour, a jewelry store manager and insurance salesman, and Irene Latour (née Fisher).

LaTour completed a bachelor's degree in history in 1975, and a master's degree in labor studies in 1979, both from Rutgers University in New Jersey. She later wrote that it was not until 1976 that she first learned about Rosie the Riveter and the role of women working in shipyards during World War II. While working on her graduate degree, she interviewed women at a Ford automobile assembly plant in Linden, New Jersey.

== Labor activism ==
Toward the end of her first year in college, LaTour started working in factories in Philadelphia, and later in Newark, New Jersey, to support herself, learning firsthand about what she called "large and small daily indignities" in the workplace. Over the years, she worked in a printing plant; in pharmaceutical and electronics assembly lines for companies such as Hewlett-Packard; and in warehouses. She gained experience as a spot welder and drill press operator, and apprenticed as a building superintendent and painter/renovator.

=== Union organizing ===
LaTour first became involved in labor organizing in the 1960s as a rank-and-file union activist. Her experience in industrial action included leading walkouts at a factory in Philadelphia to protest the lack of heating, and participating in a Teamster-sanctioned wildcat strike at United Parcel Service in Edison, New Jersey. She was also involved in union organizing at Revlon.

In 1977, LaTour became an organizer for District 65 of the United Automobile Workers of America. Despite its reputation as a left-leaning union, she soon became disillusioned with internal union politics. While working as a union staff member, she participated in the Coalition for Labor Union Women, but when female union representatives and support staff tried to organize their own District 65 women's group, they were quickly shut down by union leaders. In 1979, after three years as an organizer, she was fired. According to LaTour, she was told at the time that she had been fired "because [she] favored the workers over the union."

=== Labor education and reform ===
LaTour shifted focus to work as a labor educator, and became an advocate for union reform and for women in traditionally male-dominated blue-collar trades. She was an adjunct instructor at labor education programs at Empire State College, Queens College, and other institutions, and taught classes to electrical apprentices from IBEW Local Union No. 3. While working as a package sorter on the night shift at UPS in the 1980s, she helped to organize monthly meetings of the female workers, and tried to convince Teamsters Local 177 leaders that changes were required to improve retention of the small number of female truck drivers who worked there. For several years, LaTour worked as an organizer for the White Lung Association, a nonprofit focused on educating the public about the hazards of asbestos exposure in the workplace.

In 1989, LaTour became director of the Women's Project for the Association for Union Democracy, an organization in Brooklyn co-founded by union reformer Herman Benson. LaTour also worked with the Robert F. Wagner Labor Archives at New York University, where she was initially hired to process the papers of Burton H. Hall, a lawyer who had represented dissidents within unions.

== Writing career ==
LaTour wrote for and edited many labor-focused publications. In the 1990s, she edited the New York Hard Hat News, a quarterly newspaper for construction workers covering topics related to union democracy, site safety, and fighting corruption within unions and the building industry, working with Guy Robinson. In the early 2000s, she was an associate editor at Public Employee Press, the publication of the District Council 37 of AFSCME, the American Federation of State, County and Municipal Employees. LaTour also served on the executive board of the New York Labor History Association, and for a time edited its newsletter, Work History News. She joined the board of directors of the Women's Press Collective after speaking at a WPC event in 2011.

In addition, LaTour contributed to numerous other publications, including academic journals such as Labor's Heritage, Labor History, and The Journal of Labor and Society, as well as magazines and websites such as CounterPunch, LaborPress, The Indypendent, Z Magazine, and Znet.

=== Sisters in the Brotherhoods (2008) ===
For her first book, LaTour conducted oral history interviews and compiled research on 23 women who entered traditionally male blue-collar trades in New York City in the late 1970s and 1980s. The women profiled included carpenters, electricians, plumbers, truck drivers, telecommunications technicians, firefighters, biomedical engineers, and union officials. LaTour conducted most of the interviews over two periods: between 1989 and 1994, and between 2004 and 2006. When she first started doing interviews, she had envisaged creating a brochure, but was inspired to write a book, after giving a talk titled, "Live! From New York: Women Construction Workers in Their Own Words" at the North American Labor History Conference in October 2000, which was subsequently published as an article in the May 2001 issue of Labor History.

Published in 2008 by Palgrave Macmillan, Sisters in the Brotherhoods: Working Women Organizing for Equality in New York City received positive reviews.The Oral History Review argued that "By presenting these stories within the context of labor history, Jane LaTour goes far in dispelling misunderstandings of blue-collar women's engagement with the Second Wave Feminist movement", demonstrating that the women themselves were aware of gender politics in the workplace, the historic significance of their employment in their trades, and the need to organize. Writing in The Women's Review of Books, labor scholar Brigid O'Farrell noted LaTour's skills in chronicling "the tensions they faced within the organizations they created: cross-trade groups such as United Tradeswomen (UT); intraunion groups such as Women Electricians (WE); and training programs such as Nontraditional Employment for Women (NEW)". She addressed issues of race, class, and sexual orientation, as well as union corruption and hostility toward reform. O'Farrell commented, "Latour is able to show progress, albeit modest, across the three decades of her study."

=== Backroom Bargaining (2026) ===
LaTour's second book, Backroom Bargaining: Racketeering and Rebellion in New York City's Labor Unions, was published posthumously in March 2026 by University of Illinois Press. Based on oral history interviews, the book focuses on rank-and-file activism within unions and the limits of union reform.

== Honors and awards ==
LaTour was a two-time recipient of the Mary Heaton Vorse Award, the top journalism honor given by the Metro New York Labor Communications Council. In 2005, she won the award for a series of articles she wrote for Public Employee Press on the impact of the Iraq War on members of District Council 37. In 2007, she was recognized for her "Poverty Fighters" series on the growth of poverty in New York City, and the actions of DC 37 members in helping those in need.

In November 2012, LaTour received the John Commerford Labor Education Award from the New York Labor History Association, and was honored alongside Peter Yarrow of Peter, Paul and Mary.

== Personal life ==
In 1966, LaTour gave up her son Richard for adoption, but was later reunited with him. Her first marriage in 1967 ended in divorce.

In 1991, LaTour met and moved in with Russell Smith, whom she married in 2012. Smith was an organizer and staff representative for the Transport Workers Union (TWU) Local 100, working with thousands of members from First Transit and New York Waterway, as well as school bus drivers.

LaTour died of complications of lung cancer at Calvary Hospital in the Bronx, on April 3, 2023, at age 76.

== Selected publications ==
=== Books ===
- Sisters in the Brotherhoods: Working Women Organizing for Equality in New York City. New York: Palgrave Macmillan. 2008.
- Backroom Bargaining: Racketeering and Rebellion in New York City's Labor Unions. Champaign: University of Illinois Press. 2026.

=== Articles ===
- "Putting Labor on the Map: The New York State Project". Labor's Heritage 10 (3). Spring/Summer 1999.
- "Live! From New York: Women Construction Workers in Their Own Words". Labor History 42 (2). May 2001.
- "Looking for a Fire Department That Looks Like New York". Gotham Gazette. December 3, 2001.
- "The Uncompensated Costs of Electricity". WorkingUSA 5 (4). Spring 2002.
- "In Their Own Words: Insurgents and the Limits of Reform in Organized Labor". WorkingUSA 16 (2). June 2013.
