= Clyde Summers =

American legal scholar

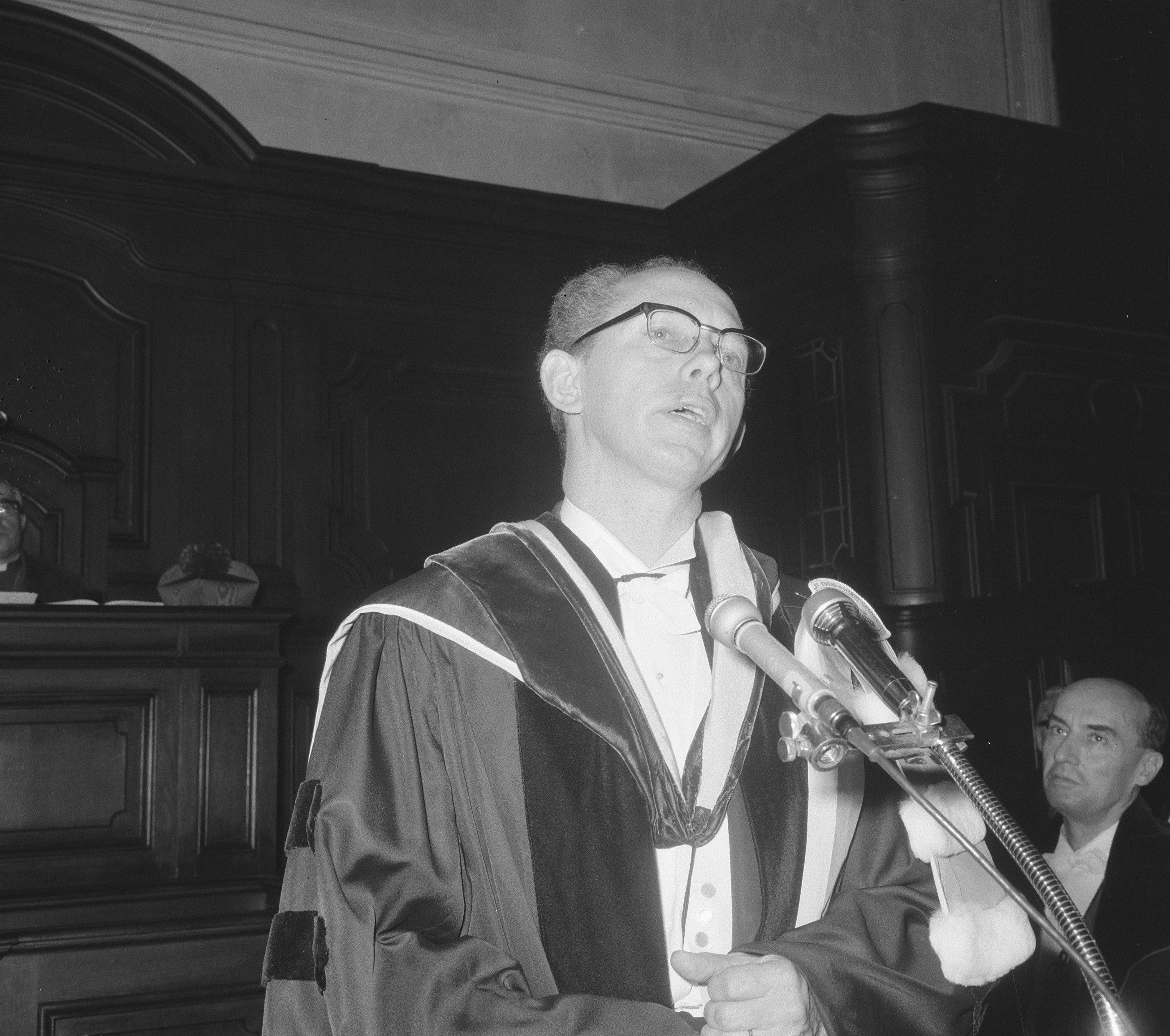
- Summers receiving an honorary doctorate at the Catholic University of Leuven in 1966
- Born: Clyde Wilson Summers; November 21, 1918; Grass Range, Montana, US
- Died: October 30, 2010 (aged 91); Germantown, Pennsylvania, US
- Employer(s): Yale Law School (1956–1975); University of Pennsylvania Law School (1975–2005)
- Known for: US labor law scholar
- Title: Jefferson B. Fordham Professor of Law

Clyde Wilson Summers (November 21, 1918 – October 30, 2010) was an American lawyer and educator who advocated for more democratic procedures in labor unions. He helped write the Labor Management Reporting and Disclosure Act of 1959 (also known as the Landrum–Griffin Act or LMRDA) and was highly influential in the field of labor law, authoring more than 150 publications on the issue of union democracy alone. He was considered the nation's leading expert on union democracy. "What Louis Brandeis was to the field of privacy law, Clyde Summers is to the field of union democracy," wrote Widener University School of Law professor Michael J. Goldberg in the summer of 2010. "Summers, like Brandeis, provided the theoretical foundation for an important new field of law."

== Early life ==
Summers was born in Grass Range, Montana. His parents were farmers, and the Summers family moved to Colorado; South Dakota; and Tecumseh, Nebraska, before settling in Winchester, Illinois, in 1929. His mother died that same year. Summers attended high school in Winchester, and entered the University of Illinois at the age of 16. There, he earned a Bachelor of Science in accounting in 1939 and subsequently attended the University's college of law where he graduated with a J.D. (cum laude) in 1942. While an undergraduate and law student, Summers became active in the Methodist Student Movement and became a believer in the social gospel.

== Career and further education ==
Summers' brother had enlisted in the United States Army at the beginning of World War II. But Summers, opposed to the use of force, declared himself a conscientious objector. The Illinois State Bar Association admitted he was of high moral character and exhibited excellent knowledge of the law, but denied him admission in 1942 due to his conscientious objector status. In a highly controversial but important decision, the Supreme Court of the United States upheld the denial of admission to the bar in In re Summers, 325 U.S. 561 (1945). Summers later was admitted to the New York State Bar Association.

He taught law at the University of Toledo from 1942 to 1945. In the summer of 1945, although a law professor and no longer a student, he participated in the Chicago YMCA's "Students in Industry," joined union strike picket lines, and protested discrimination against African Americans at local restaurants. While teaching at Toledo, he met and married Evelyn Wahlgren, a music teacher. They had two sons and two daughters.

Summers earned a Master of Laws in 1946 and a Doctor of Juridical Science in 1952, both from Columbia University. He taught law at the University of Buffalo from 1949 to 1956. While at Buffalo, Summers was also employed by the United Auto Workers and United Steelworkers to teach labor law to union members, and represented union members in arbitration hearings. In the summer of 1949, the American Civil Liberties Union (ACLU) asked Summers to update the organization's 1943 report, Democracy in Trade Unions. The updated report was published in June 1952. He taught law at Yale Law School from 1956 to 1975, but left after he felt marginalized by the faculty there. He joined the University of Pennsylvania Law School in 1975, where he was Jefferson B. Fordham Professor of Law. He retired in 2005 at the age of 87.

== Union work ==
In the 1940s and 1950s, Summers wrote numerous "ground-breaking" articles for law reviews that discussed how labor unions were violating their members' rights and the lack of democratic procedures and due process in union constitutions and processes. His 1947 article, "The Right to Join a Union", proved to be a critical piece in the development of his legal thinking, because it advocated that union members do not merely gain the right to work on a job but gain the right to actively participate in the union's decision-making processes.

As the United States Senate Select Committee on Improper Activities in Labor and Management began holding hearings in early 1957 on organized crime's influence in labor unions, Governor of New York Averell Harriman believed a similar commission should be created to address problems in his state. Subsequently, Harriman established the Governor's Committee on Improper Labor and Management Practices and appointed Summers chair. Summers and the committee drafted legislation which eventually became the New York Labor and Management Improper Practices Act of 1958. That same year, Summers drafted a "bill of rights for union members" for the ACLU.

Summers' work was critical to the drafting and passage of the Landrum–Griffin Act of 1959. His 1952 ACLU report helped frame the legislative proposals the Senate Select Committee considered as its work came to an end. In 1957, Harvard Law School professor Archibald Cox was asked by Senator John F. Kennedy to put together a panel of experts to draft labor law reform legislation that would address the issues raised by the Select Committee. The draft legislation which Summers helped write was the foundation of the 1958 Kennedy-Ives Bill, which itself was incorporated into the Landrum–Griffin Act. The New York legislation Summers helped write became the basis for Title V of the Act. His testimony before the Senate "played a pivotal role in the Senate's narrow vote, during the next session of Congress, to add a Union Members' Bill of Rights to the bill..."

For nearly four decades starting in 1969, Summers served on the board of directors of the Association for Union Democracy (AUD), on the invitation of union reformer Herman Benson, whom he had worked closely with in supporting early cases filed under the LMRDA. He was also a member of the AUD Legal Review Committee, which helped decide which lawsuits the organization would participate in. Summers deeply influenced Supreme Court decisions several times. He submitted the AUD's brief in Hall v. Cole, 412 U.S. 1 (1973), in which the Supreme Court interpreted the Landrum–Griffin Act to permit the awarding of attorney's fees to successful plaintiffs. His arguments "and the legitimacy his presence in the case lent to those arguments no doubt influenced the outcome of this case..." He participated in two landmark Landrum–Griffin decisions of the US Supreme Court, Trbovich v. United Mine Workers, 404 U.S. 528 (1972) (which upheld the right of union members to intervene in enforcement proceedings brought by the United States Department of Labor) and Dunlop v. Bachowski, 421 U.S. 560 (1975) (which upheld the authority of federal courts to review the Department of Labor's decision to proceed or not proceed with prosecutions under Landrum–Griffin). Indeed, he wrote most of the legal brief in Trbovich. Due to his work with the United Mine Workers of America (UMWA), he later was asked to draft new constitutions for many UMWA locals as well as the international union. He also testified in a federal RICO prosecution against Teamsters Local 506, a favorable decision which eventually led to the establishment of federal trusteeship over the entire international union in 1989.

Summers' theory of union democracy was that transparency and democracy make it very unlikely that organized crime will gain a foothold in a union, or that union leaders will act against their members' best interests. His 1960 casebook, Labor Relations and the Law, is considered a labor law "classic". His 1998 casebook, Labor Law, Cases and Materials, "is one of the few casebooks to provide a thorough discussion of union democracy." His most influential later work was the article "Democracy in a One-Party State: Perspectives from Landrum–Griffin," published in 1984.

== Death ==
Summers died at a retirement home in Germantown, Pennsylvania, on October 30, 2010, from complications of a stroke. He was survived by his wife, two daughters, and two sons.

== Publications ==
Articles

- 'The Right to Join a Union', Columbia Law Review, (1947) 47, p.33
- ‘The Public Interest in Union Democracy’, Northwestern Law Review, (1958) 53, p.610
- 'Worker Participation in the U.S. and West Germany: A Comparative Study from an American Perspective’, American Journal of Comparative Law, (1980) 28, p.367
- ‘Democracy in a one party state: perspectives from Landrum Griffin’, Maryland Law Review, (1984) 43, p.93

== See also ==
- US labor law
- UK labour law
