= Association for Union Democracy =

American labor organization

- Formation: 1969
- Founder: Herman Benson
- Headquarters: Brooklyn, New York
- Website: https://uniondemocracy.org/

The Association for Union Democracy (AUD) is a non-profit organization based in Brooklyn, New York, which advocates for union democracy. Founded in 1969 by union reformer Herman Benson and Yale law professor Clyde Summers, the AUD has been called "labor's leading voice on democracy issues" by Labor Studies Journal.

The AUD defines itself as a "national, pro-labor, non-profit organization dedicated solely to advancing the principles and practices of democratic trade unionism in the North American labor movement." A major focus for the organization is combatting corruption, racketeering, and discrimination within unions.

== History ==
Since it was founded in 1969, the Association for Union Democracy has served as a support network for rank-and-file dissidents and insurgents. The AUD has helped dissidents run for union office and find legal representation, and supported campaigns led by groups such as the Teamsters for a Democratic Union and Miners for Democracy. The organization regularly defends union dissidents in court and before the National Labor Relations Board (NLRB), and has been credited with catalyzing landmark court decisions. For example, the AUD has argued successfully in federal court cases that the United States Department of Labor should require unions to inform their members about their basic rights such as free speech and voting rights, in print, as specified in Section 105 of the Labor Management Reporting and Disclosure Act, also known as the Landrum–Griffin Act.

In the 1970s and early 1980s, the AUD was involved in supporting reformer Edward Sadlowski's campaign for fair and honest elections within the United Steelworkers. The AUD itself became a target of lawsuits and investigations by the Steelworkers, the New York attorney general, and the Internal Revenue Service, but prevailed in expanding the remit of nonprofits in defending union members' rights.

In 1983, seven union insurgents who were murdered while fighting to reform their unions were honored at an AUD conference with 350 attendees. The posthumous honorees included Dow Wilson and Lloyd Green of the Painters Union in California, Jock Yablonski, who led insurgents from the United Mine Workers Union, and John Acropolis, president of the Teamsters Local 456, whose cases had involved Benson, AUD, and its board members.

In 2022, the AUD reported that the organization was involved in efforts such as helping younger members of the Railway Workers United overcome obstacles to running for union office, and helping a group of rank-and-file members on the West Coast challenge the use of "confidentiality agreements" when discussing union matters, which would violate their right to free speech. The AUD authored several amicus briefs in support of a dissident Teamster, defended by an AUD board member, who convinced the United States Third Circuit Court of Appeals to rule that the NLRB had wrongly upheld his termination.

== Leadership and membership ==
The organization was led by Benson until he stepped down as executive director in 1996, after which he continued to edit the AUD newsletter. The current executive director, Kurt Richwerger, stated in 2008 that the AUD had about 800 "associates", a drop since membership had peaked 20 years prior. InfluenceWatch notes that the majority of the AUD's funding comes from individual members, with occasional grants from "left-progressive" organizations such as the New York Women's Foundation and the North Star Fund.

== Impact ==
According to Benson himself, the AUD was instrumental in supporting the movement for union reform in late 1960s and early 1970s, within major unions from the Mineworkers and Steelworkers to the IBEW (International Brotherhood of Electrical Workers). He argued that the "overthrow" of the "old guard" within the Teamsters Union in 1992 was one of the high points of the movement's success, setting the stage for John Sweeney's victory as the insurgent AFL–CIO president in 1995.

Critics have been less positive about the union democracy movement, pointing to the numerous tragedies and defeats; the weak enforcement of the Landrum–Griffin Act (LMRDA) by the United States Department of Labor; and the short-lived nature of dissident victories, after unions such as the Steelworkers, Mine Workers, and Teamsters changed their rules to limit external support which members could receive.

Writing in New Labor Forum, Steve Fraser suggests that the structure of American trade unionism – specifically the lack of a dedicated political party (comparable to a "labor party" or "social democratic party" in other countries) and the lack of industry-wide bargaining – has made the efforts of the union democracy movement futile. In 1998, Fraser wrote "The Association for Union Democracy ... has been waging the good fight for a half century; although there have been some highs, and especially some very grim lows, in the end it would be hard to argue that much has changed over that span." Nevertheless, editor David Moberg has argued, "The history of AUD [has] demonstrated the importance of outside support" in assisting "reformers of undemocratic regimes in unions" despite its small size and limited funding.

== Notable people ==
=== Founders and staff ===
- Herman Benson, co-founder, executive director to 1996, and editor
- Clyde Summers, co-founder and legal scholar
- Jane LaTour, director of AUD Women's Project and journalist

=== Advisory board ===
- Elaine Bernard, labor historian
- Phyllis Curott, attorney
- Barbara Ehrenreich, journalist
- Paul Alan Levy, attorney specializing in Internet-related free speech issues
- Deborah Meier, educator
- Ray Rogers, labor activist
- Edward Sadlowski, labor activist
- Dan Siegel, labor and employment attorney
