= Lu Palmer =

American reporter and political activist (1922–2004)

- Born: Lutrelle Fleming Palmer, Jr. March 28, 1922; Newport News, Virginia, U.S.
- Died: September 12, 2004 (aged 82)
- Occupations: Activist; reporter; political organizer; Radio show host; newspaper publisher
- Spouse: Georgia Palmer
- Children: 7
- Relatives: Ruth Apilado (second cousin)

Lutrelle Fleming "Lu" Palmer, Jr. (March 28, 1922 – September 12, 2004) was an American reporter, political activist, radio show host, and newspaper publisher in Chicago.

== Biography ==
Palmer was born in Newport News, Virginia to Lutrelle Fleming Palmer, a school principal, and his wife, Myrtle. He had two sisters, who had careers in education. He became a journalist after earning a degree from Virginia University in 1942, a masters from Syracuse University in 1948, and his Ph.D. from the University of Iowa in 1950. He served the next fifty years as a reporter, newspaper publisher and radio commentator for the black community. Palmer was a reporter for the Chicago Defender, as well as a writer for newspapers including the Chicago Daily News, and the Tri-State Defender as a columnist. He founded his own newspaper, Black X-Press Info.

Often outspoken, he lost the sponsorship of his 13-year radio program. He was a supporter of Harold Washington, who with Palmer's help became the first African American mayor of Chicago. In 1983, Palmer ran in the Democratic primary for the special election for Washington's seat in Congress, but lost to Charles Hayes, whom Washington had endorsed.

Palmer was associated recruiter and organizer and preceptor of Associated Colleges of the Midwest from 1970 until 1990.

== Honours ==
He was inducted into the Chicago State University Black Writers' Hall of Fame, the Black Journalists Hall of Fame, and was awarded the Jomo Kenyatta Award for Political Activism, Grambling State's Outstanding Service Award, Bell Labs' Black Achievement Against the Odds Award in 1982, and received the Proclamation of Unity Award in 1976.

== Personal life ==
Palmer had seven children with his wife Jorja English Palmer, and lived in Chicago's South Side. His second cousin was publisher Ruth Apilado, a newspaper editor and novelist, who founded America's Intercultural Magazine.
