= Museum Middle School =

Public middle school in Yonkers, New York, U.S.

Coordinates: 40.9554°N 73.8967°W

Location
- Yonkers, New York; United States

Museum Middle School was a public middle school in Yonkers, New York, United States.

Museum Middle School was run by the Yonkers Public Schools. Museum was home to the city's academically talented (AT) program for middle schoolers and another program coordinated with the Hudson River Museum next to the school. It is in one of the newest school buildings in Yonkers, having been built in the early 1990s. It is near the Hudson River.

Principals were Dr. Catherine Mayus, Ms. Christine Wagner, and Mr. Shapiro.

Museum Middle School is now Riverside High School for Engineering and Design.
