= Saunders Trades and Technical High School =

Coordinates: 40.942933°N 73.870279°W

- Saunders Trades and Technical High School
- 183 Palmer Road, Yonkers, New York 10709

Information
- Type: Public, magnet High School
- Established: 1909; 115 years ago
- School district: Yonkers Public Schools
- Principal: Jeremy Rynders
- Staff: 83.02 (FTE)
- Grades: 9-12
- Enrollment: 1043 (2023-24)
- Student to teacher ratio: 13.56
- Colors: Blue, White and Black
- Athletics: Saunders Blue Devils
- Mascot: Blue Devil
- Website: https://www.yonkerspublicschools.org/saunders

Saunders Trades and Technical High School (Saunders High School or SHS) is a career and technical education public high school for grades 9–12 that specializes in Animation, Architecture, Automotive Technology, Biology and Chemical Technology, Electronic & Computer Circuitry, Culinary Arts, Cosmetology, Fashion Design, Graphics Design, Carpentry, and Heating, Ventilation, Air Conditioning/Refrigeration. Saunders Trades and Technical High School is a participant in SkillsUSA.

== History ==
Established through the 1909 will of Ervin Saunders (1848–1909), a Yonkers philanthropist and son of tool‑manufacturer David Saunders, the school was created to advance his vision of a public institution that would teach mechanical trades and the scientific, technical knowledge needed by working people—especially those who labored during the day and could only attend night classes. Opening that same year as New York State's first public vocational high school, it originally operated at 104 South Broadway, a building that still stands and later became home to the Yonkers Police Department and City Court. The school's early development reflected Yonkers' rapid industrial expansion in the late 19th and early 20th centuries, when manufacturing and skilled trades were central to the city's growth, making vocational training a critical community investment. In 1980, after more than seven decades at its original site, the institution moved to its current campus at 183 Palmer Road, where it continued to evolve as a citywide magnet school offering integrated academic and trade-based education—an approach that has remained a defining feature for over a century.

== Awards and recognition ==
In October 1994, the Middle States Association of Secondary Schools and Colleges evaluated Saunders to be an exemplary high school, "a model for the nation." In both 1995 and 1998 Saunders was selected to be a "New York State School of Excellence." After a rigorous application process and three days visitation, the United States Department of Education recognized Saunders as a "Blue Ribbon School of Excellence."

== Notable students ==
- Rich Ranglin, American football player
- Dave Costa͵ America football player
- Frederick Joseph, Bestselling author
