= Herman Benson =

American union reformer (1915–2020)

- Born: Herman William Benson; July 9, 1915; The Bronx, New York City, U.S.
- Died: July 2, 2020 (aged 104); Brooklyn, New York City, U.S.
- Education: Empire State College
- Occupation: Leader in union democracy movement
- Known for: Principal founder of Association for Union Democracy

Herman William Benson (July 9, 1915 – July 2, 2020) was an American union reformer and machinist, who founded and led the Association for Union Democracy (AUD), based in Brooklyn, New York. He fought corruption and racketeering within unions, defended rank-and-file union members' rights, and advocated union democracy for over 60 years. Following his death, New Politics called him "the best known advocate of union democracy in left labor circles".

== Early life and education ==
Benson was born on July 9, 1915, in the Bronx, New York, and attended DeWitt Clinton High School. His parents were Lilian (née Edelman) and Samuel Benson, who owned a showroom for Studebaker automobiles in Washington Heights.

At the age of fifteen, Benson joined the Young People's Socialist League. In 1933, Benson was one of 20 students expelled from the City College of New York, for participating in an anti-war protest against the campus ROTC during his sophomore year. When the draft began several years later, he received a deferment due to a hearing impairment. In 1975, he completed a bachelor of arts degree in labor history at Empire State College, at the age of 60.

== Trade career ==
After getting expelled in 1933, Benson worked in several factories, including one which made Shirley Temple dolls. He went on to have a 20-year career as a skilled toolmaker, and worked in Detroit and New York.

Around 1940, Benson joined Max Shachtman and Hal Draper as they formed the Workers Party, a breakaway socialist party. He became a party organizer and was an associate editor of its newspaper, Labor Action. In 1947, he ran as the Workers Party candidate for mayor of Detroit, but was defeated. He then returned to New York.

From 1962 to 1980, Benson worked part-time for the American ORT Federation, a Jewish vocational organization, as a machinery consultant, purchasing director, and contract administrator for its federally funded programs.

== Career as union reformer ==
Benson spent over 60 years as a leader in the union democracy movement, serving as its "chief spokesman". He first got involved in union reform issues in 1958, when he tried unsuccessfully to help two dissident Machinist Union members get reinstated, after they were expelled for having distributed handbills questioning the financial practices of their local union business agent. Ironically, they were expelled by the union's international president, A. J. Hayes, who was also serving as chairman of the ethical practices committee of the AFL–CIO.

Working with Socialist leader Norman Thomas, Benson organized an ad hoc legal fund for activist Marion Cieply and Irwin Rappaport, a shop steward. While the Labor Management Reporting and Disclosure Act (LMRDA) protecting the basic rights of union members was passed in 1959, Benson soon realized that rank-and-file union members pushing for reform still had nowhere to turn for support and legal representation.

=== Collaboration with Clyde Summers ===
In early 1960, Benson recruited Yale law professor Clyde Summers to help organize the legal committee for the two dissident machinists in one of the first cases to be filed under the Labor Management Reporting and Disclosure Act of 1959, which Summers had helped to draft. Although the lawsuit was eventually dismissed because the events had taken place before the LMRDA, also known as the Landrum–Griffin Act, had been passed, the case marked the start of a decades-long collaboration between Benson and Summers.

Legal scholar Michael J. Goldberg wrote, "Clyde Summers and Herman Benson spent the rest of their careers working together as the leading figures in the union democracy movement, with Summers providing the legal expertise and Benson providing the street smarts, organizing and fundraising skills, and willingness to work for a pittance".

=== Union reform efforts in the 1960s ===
From 1960 to 1972, Benson published his newsletter Union Democracy in Action to encourage reform-minded union members and build support among union activists and intellectuals. Throughout the 1960s, he was involved in numerous campaigns to expose and fight corruption in unions.

In 1961, Benson was approached by Frank Schonfeld, a house painter who complained about rampant corruption within the Painters and Allied Trades Union in New York, including taking payoffs from contractors and cheating insurance funds, resulting in stagnant wages for union members. Benson independently confirmed the allegations, and organized support for Schonfeld as he ran for union president, lost, and was expelled, until his expulsion was overturned in court. In 1967, Schonfeld was elected to the post of secretary-treasurer of District 9 after his predecessor, Martin Rarback, was indicted for taking $840,000 in bribes, and a federal judge overruled the Department of Labor to allow the election to take place after the union tried to prevent it. Schonfeld succeeded in securing better contracts for union members, but was ousted in 1972, with organized crime regaining control.

Despite their initial successes in working with Schonfeld and others, the shocking murders of several union dissidents and reformers convinced both Benson and Summers that more needed to be done to protect them. Benson chronicled the efforts of Dow Wilson, a local union secretary in the Painters Union in San Francisco, who was assassinated in 1966 after defeating union officials who had attempted to sabotage a painters' strike the previous year and accused Wilson of slander. Following the murder, Benson sought publicity for Wilson's story, which was broken by Frank Porter in a major four-part series in The Washington Post. A few days later, Wilson's ally Lloyd Green was gunned down in his office. Working again with Norman Thomas, Benson helped coordinate a committee of 21 co-sponsors calling for a full investigation by the United States Department of Justice into the two murders and racketeering in the painting industry. The subsequent investigation resulted in multiple convictions, including the conviction of union official Ben Rasnick who had ordered the killings, and media coverage in The Wall Street Journal, as well as BusinessWeek and Time magazines, exposing corruption scandals within the Painters Union nationwide.

=== Association for Union Democracy ===
In 1969, Benson founded the Association for Union Democracy (AUD), a non-profit organization, and asked Summers to join as an active member of its Board of Directors. With Benson at the helm as its executive director, the AUD functioned as a support network, educating union members about their rights; advising and assisting union dissidents and reformers in finding legal representation; raising funds; and advocating democracy within unions as a means of fighting corruption.

One of the most prominent cases which Benson and the AUD worked on was in pushing for fair and honest elections within the United Steelworkers, in support of reformer Edward Sadlowski who won his bid for district president but lost his campaign for international union president. Although the Steelworkers, the New York attorney general, and the Internal Revenue Service filed lawsuits and investigations against AUD for its involvement, the AUD fought back and succeeded in expanding the role that non-profits could play in defending union members' rights. The AUD also supported the Teamsters for a Democratic Union and its allies in their battle against the old guard within the Teamsters' Union. Controversially, Benson supported government intervention in the form of lawsuits against the Teamsters and other organizations, filed under RICO, the Racketeer Influenced and Corrupt Organizations Act.

From 1972 onward, Benson's newsletter was known as Union Democracy Review. He continued editing the newsletter, even after stepping down as executive director of the AUD in 1996.

=== Book ===
In 2004, Benson published Rebels, Reformers, and Racketeers: How Insurgents Transformed the Labor Movement, his account of AUD history, including its work with dissidents and reformers in fighting corruption across multiple unions.

== Personal life and death ==
Herman Benson was married to his wife Revella for 50 years, and had two children. Born in Akron, Ohio, in 1919, Revella Sholiton attended the University of Akron, but dropped out to become an activist in the Socialist Party. The Bensons first met in Detroit, where they were both working in factories and were active in the Workers Party. After moving to New York, she worked for the United Teachers Federation, and did volunteer work. On March 4, 1996, she was murdered at their doorstep, several months before his planned retirement as executive director of AUD. Benson installed a stone marker in his front garden with the words, "May her killer rot in hell."

Following her death, Benson lived with Lucy Dames, who died in 2014. In 2015, he married Cherril Neckles-Benson.

Benson died in Brooklyn on July 2, 2020, at the age of 104. In Benson's own obituary, which he wrote himself in the third person prior to his 100th birthday, he quipped that "his last, dying words" were: "This is the time for a donation to the Association for Union Democracy. Make it generous."
