= Trbovich v. United Mine Workers =

- Supreme Court of the United States

Argued November 18, 1971 Decided January 17, 1972
- Full case name: Trbovich v. United Mine Workers, et al.
- Citations: 404 U.S. 528 (more) 92 S. Ct. 630; 30 L. Ed. 2d 686; 15 Fed. R. Serv. 2d (Callaghan) 1083; 79 L.R.R.M. 2193

Case history
- Prior: On appeal from the United States Court of Appeals for the District of Columbia Circuit

Holding
- The Labor-Management Reporting and Disclosure Act of 1959 does not bar union members from intervening in enforcement proceedings brought by the United States Department of Labor in enforcement proceedings under the Act.

Court membership
- Chief Justice Warren E. Burger Associate Justices William O. Douglas · William J. Brennan Jr. Potter Stewart · Byron White; Thurgood Marshall · Harry Blackmun; Lewis F. Powell Jr. · William Rehnquist

Case opinions
- Majority: Marshall, joined by Burger, Brennan, Stewart, White, Blackmun
- Concur/dissent: Douglas
- Rehnquist, Powell took no part in the consideration or decision of the case.

Trbovich v. United Mine Workers, 404 U.S. 528 (1972), is a 6–1 decision of the Supreme Court of the United States in which the Court held that the Labor-Management Reporting and Disclosure Act of 1959 gave union members the right to intervene in enforcement proceedings brought by the United States Department of Labor in enforcement proceedings under the Act.
