= Roosevelt High School (Yonkers, New York) =

Coordinates: 40.95427°N 73.844604°W

- Roosevelt High School logo
- 631 Tuckahoe Road, Yonkers, New York 10710

Information
- Type: Public High School
- School district: Yonkers Public Schools
- Principal: Steve Naber
- Staff: 63.01 (FTE)
- Grades: 9 - 12
- Enrollment: 956 (2017–18)
- Student to teacher ratio: 15.17
- Colors: Blue and White
- Athletics: Roosevelt Sharks
- Mascot: SHARK
- Website: https://www.yonkerspublicschools.org/roosevelt

The Theodore Roosevelt High School was a public high school opened in 1926, operated by Yonkers Public Schools, located on the corner of Tuckahoe Road and Central Park Avenue in Yonkers, New York. It shared its campus with Early College High School from 2010, which completely replaced Roosevelt High School in 2013. Then, due to fierce opposition by alumni, on June 18, 2014, the Yonkers Board of Education voted to rename Early College High School, to the new name of Roosevelt High School – Early College Studies.

The class of 2013 was the last graduating class at the original Roosevelt High School, as the building changed its name, school colors, and mascot to "Early College High School". The change was the result of test scores given to the school, as well as to offer a two-year college preparatory program within the city. As of fall 2014, Roosevelt has reverted to a name closer to its old name, as it is now "Roosevelt High School - Early College Studies" although the home team is now "The Sharks" (changed from the former school mascot "The Indians"), and the team colors are no longer red and white; they are now blue and white. On June 23, 2015, the school held a ceremony to officially commemorate the new name "Roosevelt High School - Early College Studies".

== Alumni ==
- Pulitzer Prize winning author and journalist David Halberstam graduated from Roosevelt High School in Yonkers in 1951.
- Mary J. Blige attended this school and dropped out during her junior year.
- Steven Tallarico, better known as Steven Tyler, the lead singer for Aerosmith and a judge on American Idol, also attended and was expelled from this school due to drug use. Tyler's bandmate in Aerosmith, drummer Joey Kramer, also graduated from Roosevelt High School.
- Other famous alumni include astronaut Ron Garan, Hall & Oates bass player Tom Wolk aka T. Bone Wolk, actor and former president of the Screen Actors Guild Richard Masur, screenwriter Irving Brecher, and 1976 Miss America, Tawny Godin.
- Eugene Lent Church, theoretical physicist, graduated in 1942 at 16; he earned an AB from Princeton and a PHD from Harvard, and also served in the US Navy in WWII.
- Acting teacher and director Stephen Book graduated from Roosevelt in 1963.
