= Frederick Joseph (author) =

American author

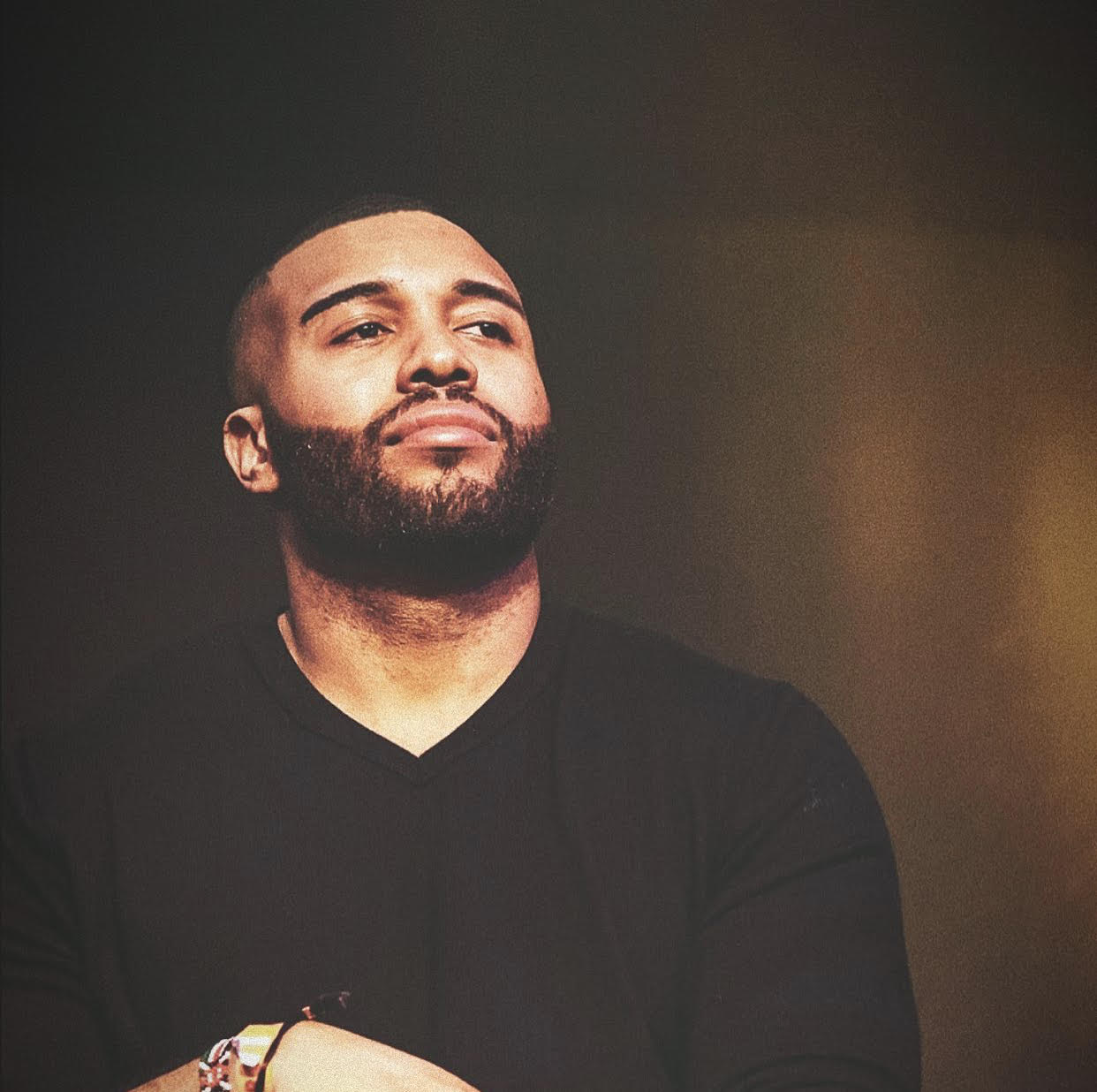
- Born: Yonkers, NY
- Education: Hunter College
- Occupations: Author, writer
- Writing career
- Language: English

Frederick Joseph is an American author from Yonkers, New York. He is a New York Times and USA Today bestselling author whose work spans nonfiction, poetry, children's literature, and young adult fiction.

He is the author of The Black Friend: On Being a Better White Person (2020), Patriarchy Blues (2022), and the young adult novel This Thing of Ours (2025), which received starred reviews from Kirkus Reviews and Publishers Weekly.

== Early life and education ==
Joseph was born and raised in Yonkers, New York. He attended Hunter College, where he studied political science and creative writing.

== Career ==
=== Writing ===
Joseph's work spans multiple genres, including nonfiction, poetry, and children's literature.

His publications include:

- The Black Friend: On Being a Better White Person (2020)
- Patriarchy Blues: Reflections on Manhood (2022)
- Better Than We Found It: Conversations to Help Save the World (2022)
- Black Panther: Wakanda Forever – The Courage to Dream (2022)
- We Alive, Beloved (2024)
- This Thing of Ours (2025)
- Planting Hope (2026)
- ''Everything’s Not Lost'' (forthcoming, 2026)

His essays and commentary have appeared in publications including The Boston Globe, Essence, HuffPost, Adweek, and Cosmopolitan.

== Books ==
=== The Black Friend: On Being A Better White Person ===
In December 2020, Candlewick Press released Frederick Joseph's first book, The Black Friend: On Being A Better White Person. The book discusses racism and was written as a tool for White people to better understand problematic behavior.

=== Patriarchy Blues: Reflections on Manhood ===
In May 2022, Harper Perennial released Frederick's second book, Patriarchy Blues: Reflections on Manhood, which examines the culture of masculinity from the perspective of a Black man. It was an instant New York Times Best Seller and includes a collection of essays, poems, and short reflections on the concept of toxic masculinity and the experiences of men, particularly those of color. Joseph's personal and cultural standpoints on fatherhood, stereotypes, and what it means to be a man were his inspiration for this book. This autobiography discusses topics related to misogyny, homophobia, and transphobia.

=== Better Than We Found It: Conversations to Help Save The World ===
In Fall 2022, Candlewick Press released Frederick and Porsche Joseph's book, Better Than We Found It: Conversations to Help Save The World. This young adult nonfiction serves as a guide to social and political progressivism, and covers issues related to climate change, health care, economic inequality, and gun violence.

=== Black Panther: Wakanda Forever: The Courage to Dream ===
In November 2022, Disney Publishing Worldwide released Frederick's debut picture book, Black Panther: Wakanda Forever: The Courage to Dream.

== Philanthropy and activism ==
Joseph has organized multiple fundraising campaigns and mutual aid initiatives. He gained national attention for the "#BlackPantherChallenge," which raised funds to provide movie tickets for children.

During the COVID-19 pandemic, he launched a rent relief campaign that distributed funds to individuals in need.

Joseph is the founder of We Have Stories, a nonprofit marketing and fundraising agency that provides financial grants for those focused on representation and inclusion.

In 2019, Girls Inc., in partnership with We Have Stories, raised more than $60,000 for girls to see Captain Marvel. Frederick stated that "Everyone should have an opportunity to see women in roles they can aspire to one day be, roles that show women as strong, smart, and bold."

In 2018, Frederick Joseph helped raise $1 million on GoFundMe for 73,000 children of color to watch Black Panther at no cost to them. At the time, it was in the largest entertainment-related GoFundMe in the company's history. The campaign tripled its goal in 10 days and included support from public figures such as Chelsea Clinton, J.J. Abrams, and Jemele Hill.

In 2020, Joseph launched a GoFundMe campaign called #RentRelief in response to the COVID-19 pandemic. The campaign sent $200 payments to those who requested it. Joseph also helped raise $40,000 for New York City's food bank network during that time.

== Personal life ==
Joseph was born and raised in Yonkers, New York and attended Saunders Trade and Technical. He cites his maternal grandmother, Thelma Ford, as one of his writing inspirations. Ford was a short story writer who was unable to become a published author because of racism and sexism.

Joseph graduated from Hunter College in 2012 with a degree in Political science and Creative Writing. After graduating, Joseph worked in copy editing and marketing, which led to his career as an author.

Joseph lives in New York.

== Views ==
Joseph frequently discusses racial issues. In a 2021 interview with Forbes about anti-blackness on social media, Joseph stated that the "algorithms were designed by White engineers with White individuals in mind" and that White consumers are "upholding systems of inequity." He partnered with Yahoo Life on an antiracism endeavor called the Allyship Pledge.

== Awards and recognition ==
- 2023 Malcolm X and Dr. Betty Shabazz Vanguard Award
- International Literacy Association (ILA) Children's and Young Adult's Book Award
- 2021 Bank Street College Best Children's Book of The Year
- 2021 Cooperative Children's Book Center Choices Book List
- 2021 In the Margins Book Award
- 2020 New York Times Bestselling Author
- 2019 Forbes 30 Under 30 for Marketing and Advertising
- Comic-Con Humanitarian of the Year
- The Root 100 List of Most Influential African Americans

== Bibliography ==
=== Adult Non-Fiction ===
- Patriarchy Blues: Reflections On Manhood (2022) ISBN 978-0-06-313832-2

=== Young Adult Fiction ===
- This Thing of Ours (2025) ISBN 978-1536233469

=== Young Adult Non-Fiction ===
- The Black Friend: On Being a Better White Person (2020) ISBN 978-1-5362-1701-8
- Better Than We Found It: Conversations to Help Save The World (2022) ISBN 978-1-5362-2452-8

=== Picture Book ===
- Black Panther: Wakanda Forever: The Courage to Dream (2022) ISBN 978-1368076739
