= Yonkers Public Schools =

School district in New York, US

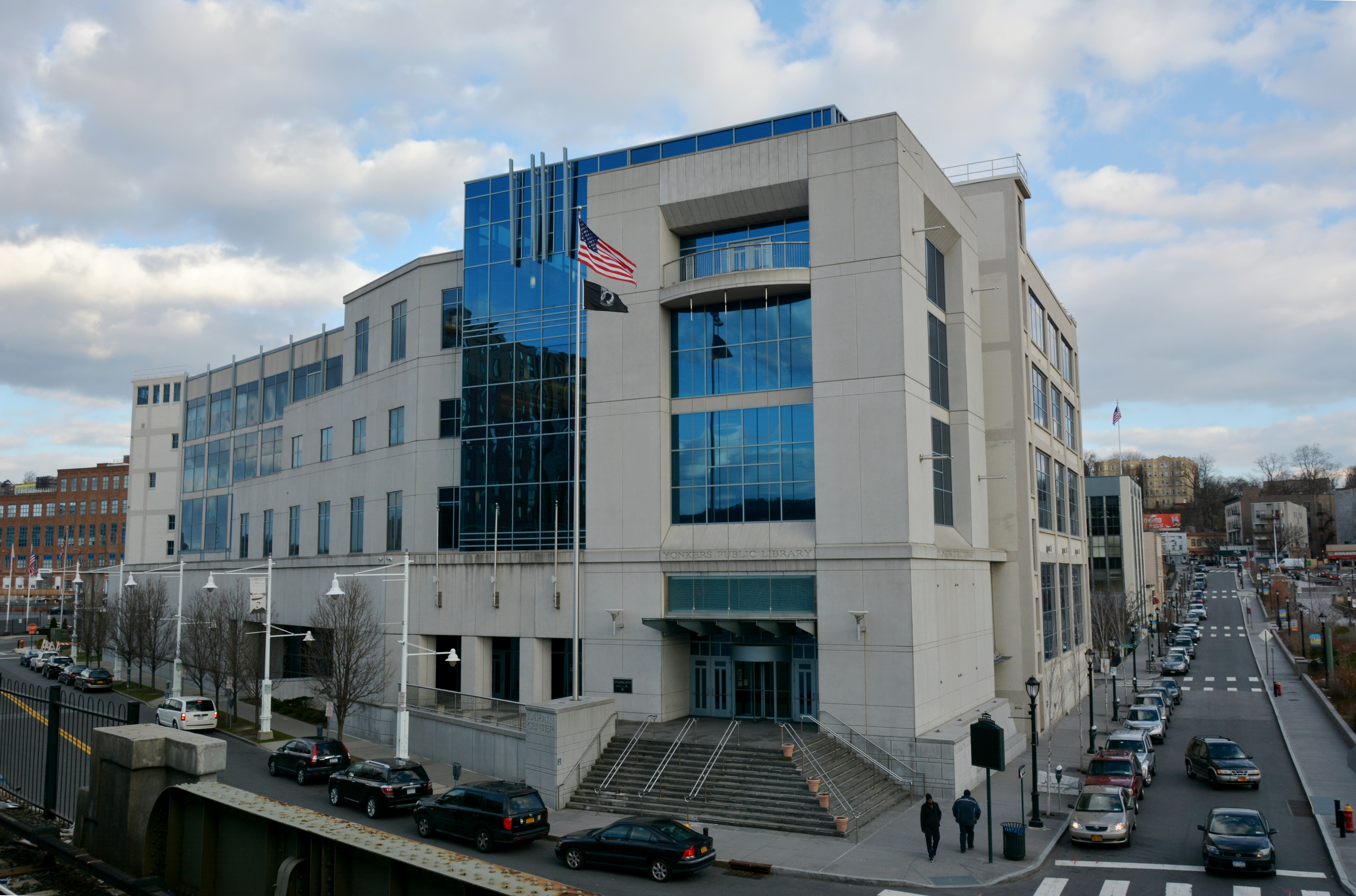
- (bottom) Headquarters for Yonkers Public Schools, also containing the Riverfront branch for the Yonkers Public Library

Location
- 1 Larkin Center, Yonkers (Westchester County) New York USA Yonkers, New York United States
- Coordinates: 40.935003°N 73.900642°W

District information
- Type: Public
- Motto: Innovation • Inspiration • Excellence for All
- Grades: PK–12
- Superintendent: Aníbal Soler, Jr.
- Asst. superintendent(s): RoseAnne Collins-Judon, Lissette M. Colón-Collins, Luis Rodriguez, Erik Wright
- Schools: 39
- Budget: $751,852,034 (2025 - 2026 school year)
- NCES District ID: 3631920.

Students and staff
- Students: 24,035
- Teachers: 1,435
- Staff: 2,024
- Student–teacher ratio: 17:1

Other information
- Website: yonkerspublicschools.org

Yonkers Public Schools (also known as Yonkers City School District) is a school district that serves all of Yonkers, New York. It is governed by a mayorally appointed Board of Trustees.

== Organization ==
The school district is organized and governed according to New York State Education Law. The Board of Education is the governing body of the school district. It consists of nine unpaid trustees, appointed by the mayor for five year terms. The trustees submit a budget to the city government, but have no taxing authority of their own. The Superintendent of Schools serves "subject to the pleasure of the Board of Education" for up to five years (contract can be extended). As the chief executive of the school district, they supervise and direct all other employees, makes decisions regarding curriculum and examination, and has a non-voting seat on the Board.

The current superintendent is Aníbal Soler Jr., who was appointed following a national search process that began in July 2023, after the retirement of Edwin Quezada. Prior to Soler's appointment, Dr. Luis Rodriguez served as the interim superintendent. In May 2024, Soler was officially appointed as the new superintendent of schools during a Board of Education meeting, where he received a unanimous vote of 8–0.

Current board members include Rosalba Corrado DelVecchio, president; Gail Burns, vice-president; John C. Castanaro; Sheila Greenwald; Amjed I. Kuri, Rosemarie P. Linton, Lorraine Lopez, Arz Raheem and Lawrence R. Sykes.

== Schools ==
All schools are located in the city of Yonkers.

=== Middle/High Schools (Grades 7-12) ===
- Gorton High School (9–12)
- Lincoln High School (9–12)
- Barack Obama School for Social Justice (7–12)
- Riverside High School (9–12)
- Roosevelt High School - Early College Studies (9–12)
- Saunders Trades and Technical High School (9–12)
- Yonkers Middle High School (7–12)
- Yonkers Montessori Academy (PK-12)
- Robert Halmi School Sr. Academy of Film and Television (6–12)

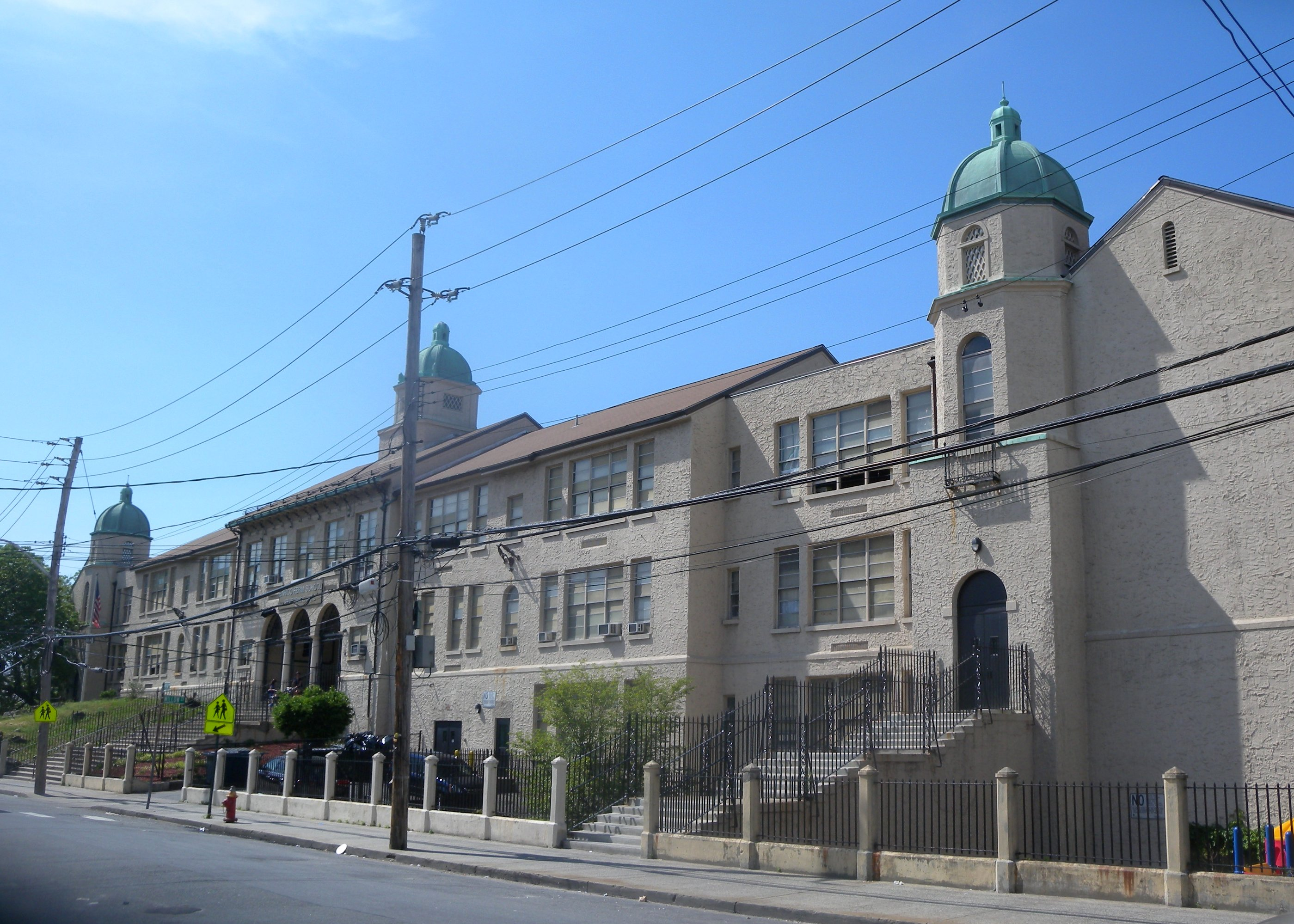
Enrico Fermi School

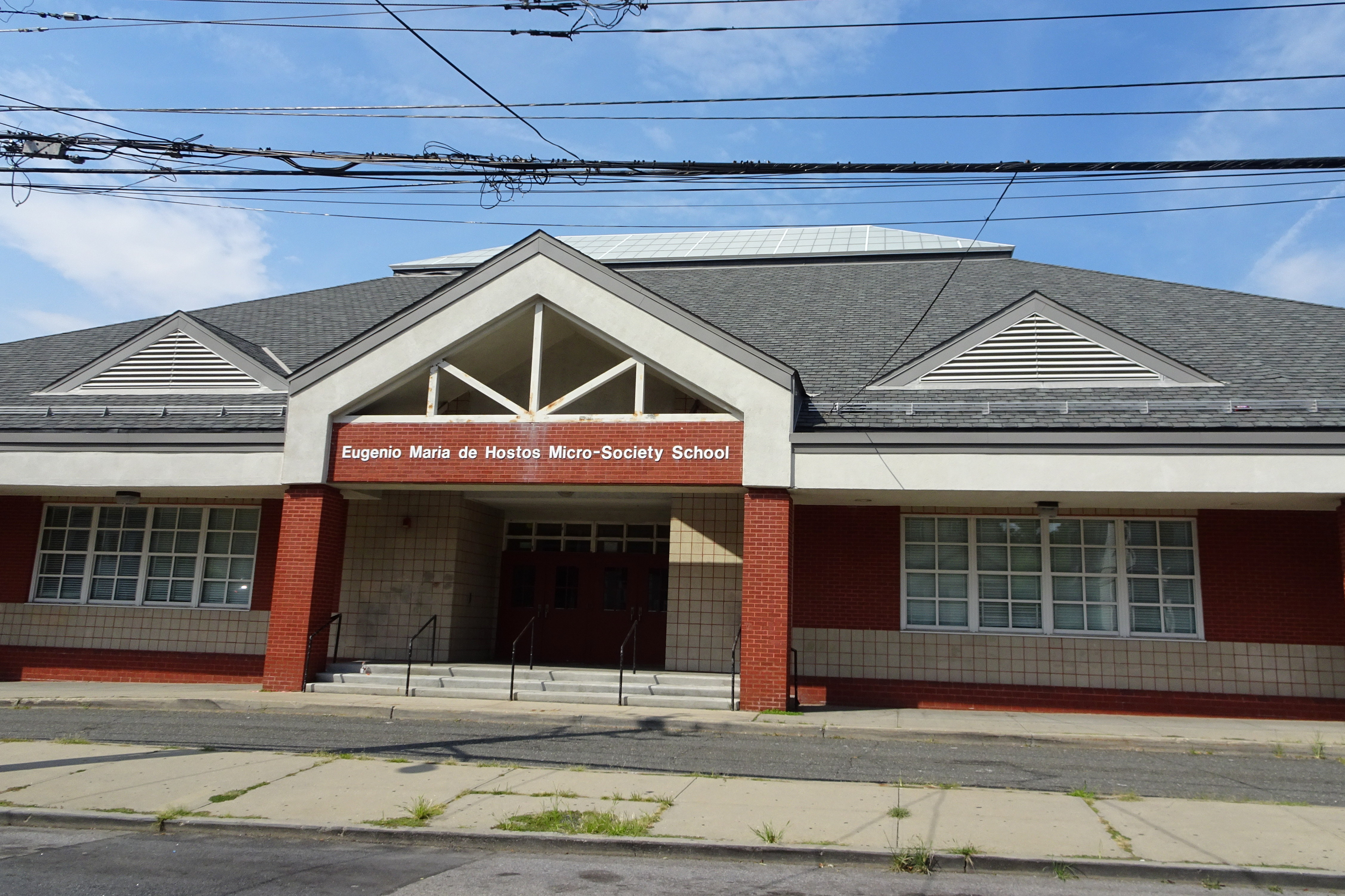
Hostos Micro-Society School

=== Elementary/Middle Schools (Grades PK-6/PK-8) ===
- Casimir Pulaski School (PK-8)
- Cedar Place Community School (PK-8; formerly known as Cedar Place School until 2018, and Cesar E. Chavez School from 2018 to 2026)
- Cross Hill Academy (3–8)
- Enrico Fermi School (PK-8)
- Eugenio María de Hostos MicroSociety School (PK-8)
- Family School 32 (PK-8)
- Justice Sonia Sotomayor Community Center (PK-8)
- Kahlil Gibran School (PK-8)
- Martin Luther King Jr. Academy (PK-8)
- Montessori School 27 (PK-6)
- Montessori School 31 (PK-6)
- Paideia School 15 (PK-8)
- Paideia School 24 (PK-6)
- Patricia A. Dichiaro School (PK-8)
- PEARLS Hawthorne School (PK-8)
- Robert C. Dodson School (PK-8)
- Rosemarie Ann Siragusa School (PK-6)
- Ella Fitzgerald Academy (PK-8)
- Las Hermanas Mirabal Community School (PK-8)
- School 16 (PK-8)
- School 17 (PK-5)
- School 22 (PK-6)
- School 23 (PK-8)
- School 30 (PK-8)
- School 5 (PK-8)
- Westchester Hills School 29 (PK-8)
- William Boyce Thompson School (PK-8)

=== Early Childhood Schools (PK-2) ===
- Yonkers Early Childhood Academy (located in same building as Cross Hill Academy)

=== Adult Education (postsecondary) ===
- VIVE School, home of Yonkers Pathways to Success

=== Former/Renamed Schools ===
- Public School # 1 was on Dunbar St off Saw Mill River Road. Demolished (year unknown).
- Public School # 2 (built 1886) became Benjamin Franklin Jr. High School on Waverly Street. After being closed for years it was remodeled and became an apartment building.
- Public School # 3 on 15 Hamilton Avenue (Now apartment building)
- Public School # 4 on Trenchard Street (Now affordable housing)
- Public School # 6 on 33 Ashburton Ave, now apartment buildings known as "Schoolhouse Terrace"
- Public School # 7 on 380 Walnut St (Campus is now used by the Andulusia School, a private Muslim school)
- Public School # 8 on 373 Bronxville Rd is now Patricia A. DiChiaro Elementary School.
- Public School # 9 on 53 Fairview St has been permanently closed starting the 2024–25 school year due to dire repairs becoming costly & low enrollment. The building remains vacant for the time being, it is unknown what will be done with the property.
- Public School # 10 (aka: Early Childhood Center) on 75 Riverdale Ave became Hudson River Academy. It is now VIVE School/Yonkers Pathway to Success.
- Public School # 11 on 99 Wakefield Avenue (Now Montessori School)
- Public School # 12 on 164 Ashburton Ave (Now Yonkers Community Action Program)
- Public School # 13 (160 McLean Avenue) was added to the National Register of Historic Places in 2007. The building is now an apartment building.
- Public School # 13 (195 McLean Avenue) replaced the former school site of 160 McLean Avenue. As of the 2022-23 Academic Year was renamed to Las Hermanas Mirabal Community School.
- Public School # 14 on 60 Crescent Place is now Rosemarie Ann Siragusa School
- Public School # 15 on 175 Westchester Ave is now the Paideaia School #15.
- Public School # 18 on 77 Park Hill Ave was now Scholastic Academy for Academic Excellence, and as of the 2022-23 Academic Year was renamed the Ella Fitzgerald Academy.
- Public School # 19 on 75 Morris St is now Eugenio Maria de Hostos MicroSociety School.
- Public School # 21 on 100 Lee Ave closed starting the 2026-27 school year as part of the budget for the 2026-2027 school year. Factors such as declining enrollment affected the decision.
- Public School # 24 on 50 Colin Street is now the Paideaia School # 24
- Public School # 25 on 579 Warburton Ave, is now the Museum School 25.
- Public School # 26 on 150 Kings Cross is now Casimir Pulaski School.
- Public School # 27 on 132 Valentine Lane is now Montessori School # 27.
- Public School # 28 on 18 Rosedale Rd is now Kahlil Gibran School.
- Public School # 29 on 47 Croydon Rd is now Westchester Hills School.
- Public School # 31 on 7 Ravenswood Rd is now Montessori School # 31.
- Public School # 32 on 1 Montclair Place is now Family School # 32.
- Public School # 33 on 135 Locust Hill Ave is now Martin Luther King Jr. School.
- Emerson Junior High School on 160 Bolmer Ave became Emerson Middle School and is now Cross Hill Academy and Yonkers Early Childhood Academy.
- John Burroughs Junior High School on Palmer Rd is now Saunders Trades and Technical High School
- Nathaniel Hawthorne High School on 350 Hawthorne Ave became Nathaniel Hawthorne Jr. High School is now PEARLS Hawthorne School
- Museum Junior High School on 565 Warburton Ave became Museum Middle School and is now Riverside High School
- Henry Wadsworth Longfellow Jr. High School on 190 N Broadway/201 Palisade Ave became Yonkers High School of Commerce in 1938. It then became Commerce Middle School in 2000, Palisade Preparatory School in September 2008, and the Barack Obama School for Social Justice in September 2022.
- Mark Twain Middle School and Montessori School 11 on 99 Wakefield Ave/160 Woodlawn Ave combined into one school and is now Yonkers Montessori Academy.
- Walt Whitman Jr. High School on Shore View Drive/105 Avondale Rd is now the Robert C. Dodson School.
- Yonkers High School on South Broadway. Demolished (Year Unknown)
- Yonkers High School on 150 Rockland Ave became John Burroughs Middle School and is now Yonkers Middle High School
- Longfellow Jr. High School (previously known as P.S. 20 until 1938, when it moved from its previous location on 190 N Broadway) on 23 Mulberry St (will become a 40-unit apartment building)
- Yonkers High School, previously known as Benjamin Franklin Jr. High School, on Poplar St. became Enrico Fermi Middle School which is now Enrico Fermi School. The first Yonkers High School was originally on South Broadway and Nepperhan Avenue, across the street from City Hall.
- Saunders Trade and Technical High School on South Broadway (school relocated to Palmer Road [in former John Burroughs Junior High School and the Old Board of Education Headquarters] and old building is now Yonkers Police Headquarters on S. Broadway)
- Elizabeth Seton College on 1061 N. Broadway became Foxfire School and is now William Boyce Thompson School.
- Thomas Cornell Academy on 15 St Mary St closed starting the 2024-25 year due to low enrollment and repairs for the aging building.
- Museum School 25 (PK-5) on 579 Warburton Ave closed starting the 2025-26 year due to low enrollment, repairs for the aging building, and a large number of students scoring below proficiency on state tests.
