= Dave Costa =

American football player (1941–2013)

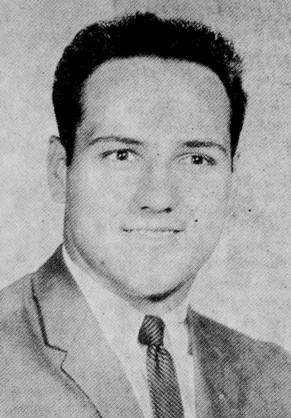
- Costa, circa 1961

No. 46, 73, 63, 64
- Positions: Defensive tackle, Defensive end

Personal information
- Born: October 27, 1941; Yonkers, New York, U.S.
- Died: May 20, 2013 (aged 71)
- Listed height: 6 ft 2 in (1.88 m)
- Listed weight: 250 lb (113 kg)

Career information
- High school: Saunders Trades & Tech (Yonkers)
- College: Utah
- NFL draft: 1963: 3rd round, 29th overall pick
- AFL draft: 1963: 7th round, 49th overall pick

Career history
- Oakland Raiders (1963-1965); Buffalo Bills (1966); Denver Broncos (1967-1971); San Diego Chargers (1972–1973); Buffalo Bills (1974)

Awards and highlights
- 3× Second-team All-AFL (1967-1969); 4× AFL All-Star (1963, 1967, 1968, 1969); WAC Lineman of the Year (1962)

Career NFL/AFL statistics
- Fumble recoveries: 13
- Sacks: 65.5
- Safeties: 1
- Stats at Pro Football Reference

David Joseph Costa (October 27, 1941 – May 20, 2013) was an American professional football defensive tackle. He played college football at the University of Utah and Northeastern Junior College, was selected to play in three college all-star games after his senior season at Utah, and was the first person to receive the Western Athletic Conference's Lineman of the Year award. He played in the American Football League (AFL) with the Oakland Raiders from 1963 through 1965, Buffalo Bills in 1966, and Denver Broncos from 1967 through 1969. He was an AFL All-Star four times in seven years; first in 1963 for the Raiders (one of only two rookies in that game), and in 1967, 1968 and 1969 for the Broncos. He was second-team All-AFL three times. He also played in the American Football Conference of the National Football League (NFL) for the Broncos, San Diego Chargers, and Bills.

== Early life ==
Costa was born on October 27, 1941, in Yonkers, New York to David and Elsie Costa. He had two brothers and three sisters. His father was of Italian descent and his mother of Russian descent. After his freshman year in high school, he transferred to Saunders Trades and Technical High School in Yonkers, to study carpentry, where he played on the football, basketball, and track teams.

Costa played football under coach Dan Hurley. Costa began as an offensive tackle on Saunders' city champion junior varsity football team in 1956. He then became Saunders' T-formation quarterback on the varsity team in 1957 and 1958. His teammates included his brother Joe Costa, who led Saunders' defense. Costa led the team to a city championship as a junior in 1957, while being named All-City and receiving All-County recognition. As a senior in 1958, Costa was named first-team Westchester County Publishers All-County, after leading Saunders to another city championship. He was also a kick returner on the football team. Costa was an honorable mention All-American in high school.

As a junior, Costa was the leading rebounder on Saunders' basketball team. As a senior, he averaged 20 points per game. He was All-City in basketball and honorable mention All-County. He was also a Yonkers' city high school champion in the shot put throw on Saunders' track and field team as a senior.

As a high school senior, the 6 ft 1 in (1.85 m) 230 lb (104.3 kg) Costa received the Flower Memorial Trophy from the Yonk-Heers Athletic and Social Club as Most Outstanding High School Athlete in Yonkers. The award was voted on by high school coaches and media members.

== College career ==
Costa's high school football coach Dan Hurley was a friend of head coach Bob Cooke at Northeastern Junior College in Sterling, Colorado, and recommended Costa to Cooke. Costa received a scholarship to attend Northeastern. Costa played football for two years with Northeastern in the Empire Conference. As a freshman in 1959, he played defensive tackle and fullback. Under a new coach the next year, he was moved to offensive tackle and defensive end, but was moved back to defensive tackle after one game. Costa was named a Jr. College All-American at tackle in November 1960. Costa was also named All-Empire Conference at defensive tackle. Costa was on Northeastern's track and field team in the shot put, and on its wrestling team for a time until it conflicted with his academic load.

After being scouted by the University of Utah at a junior college all-star game in Albuquerque, Costa transferred to Utah in 1961. He played football at tackle under head coach Ray Nagel. He was honorable mention All-Skyline Conference in his first year at Utah. In 1962, Utah played in the Western Athletic Conference (WAC), the WAC's initial season. In addition to offensive tackle, the 250 lb (113 kg) Costa also played defensive tackle and middle linebacker for Utah in 1962. The WAC's players voted Costa first-team All-WAC in 1962 at tackle. He was the first player to receive the WAC's Lineman of the Year award. Costa was both an Associated Press (AP) and United Press International (UPI) honorable mention All-American in 1962 at tackle. His Utah teammates included, among others, future NFL players Marv Fleming and Roy Jefferson.

Costa was selected to play in the East-West Shrine Game in San Francisco, the January 1963 Hula Bowl, and the June 1963 East-West All-America game held in Buffalo, New York. Playing defensive left tackle for the West team in the Shrine Game, Costa's performance was "instrumental in holding the East to just 73 yards rushing". West teammate Ed Cummings of Stanford described Costa's defensive play in that game as "pure gold".

== Professional career ==
=== Oakland Raiders ===
The Los Angeles Rams selected Costa in the third round of the 1963 NFL draft, 29th overall. The Oakland Raiders selected Costa in the seventh round of the 1963 AFL draft, 49th overall. He chose to play for the Raiders, rather than the Rams, saying "I thought the opportunities would be better with a young league and a young team . . . I also had a great admiration for coach [Al] Davis. I knew he'd do a job with the club". Davis had told Costa "You are going to be so great they'll have to build another bridge to handle the crowds that come to see you play".

During the 1963 preseason, head coach Al Davis weighed using Costa at linebacker or defensive tackle. Although Costa suffered from leg injuries, and began the season as a reserve, he started 10 games at right defensive tackle for the Raiders. He led the team with seven quarterback sacks, the third highest total in the AFL that season. In a mid-October win over the Denver Broncos, 35–31, Costa blocked a Gene Mingo field goal attempt. Costa was selected to play in the AFL All-Star Game, the only rookie in that game other than Ed Budde of the Kansas City Chiefs. Costa tied for third with Bobby Bell in the voting for United Press International's and the Associated Press's AFL Rookie of the Year award.

Costa gained 16 pounds between the 1963 and 1964 seasons. In 1964, he suffered a shoulder separation during the preseason, but still started all 14 Raiders' games at right defensive tackle. It has also been reported that he missed starting some games during the 1964 season. His eight sacks in 1964 again led the Raiders, and tied Costa for third best in the AFL that season. He started 10 games in 1965, with only one sack. Costa had an ankle injury in early October.

The Raiders obtained defensive tackle Tom Keating in a trade with the Buffalo Bills before the 1966 season. In the 1966 preseason, Dan Birdwell was considered ahead of Costa as a starter at defensive tackle, alongside Keating as the other starting tackle. By late August, Costa concluded that the Raiders wanted to trade him, after being unsigned and not playing in an exhibition game; and he asked head coach John Rauch to trade him.

=== Buffalo Bills (1966) ===
In early September 1966, the Raiders traded Costa to the Buffalo Bills for a high draft pick. He did not start any games for the Bills in 1966, playing as a reserve defensive tackle behind tackles Jim Dunaway and Tom Sestak. Dunaway and Sestak had played alongside each other since 1963 and had numerous AFL All-Star and All-AFL honors between them. Costa had one quarterback sack on the season.

=== Denver Broncos ===
In January 1967, new Denver Broncos coach Lou Saban acquired Costa from the Bills in a trade for a high draft choice. Costa started all 14 games as the Broncos' right defensive tackle in 1967. He tied for the team lead in sacks (4.5) with right defensive end Rich "Tombstone" Jackson. Costa also had two fumble recoveries. He led the Broncos' defensive linemen in tackles. Costa was selected to play in the AFL All-Star Game for the second time in his career. He was named second-team All-AFL by the Associated Press, Newspaper Enterprise Association (NEA), and United Press International. Costa started all 14 Broncos' games again in 1968. He had 6.5 sacks, and was selected to play in the AFL All-Star Game for a second consecutive season. The Sporting News and Newspaper Enterprise Association named him second-team All-AFL.

In 1969, Costa had a career-high 11.5 sacks, starting in 14 games at right tackle. He was second on the Broncos in sacks, behind Rich Jackson's 12.5; and eighth best in the AFL that season. It has also been stated he had 12 sacks in 1969. He was selected to play in the AFL All-Star Game on January 17, 1970; the final event in AFL history before the merger with the NFL. Costa was named second-team All-AFL by The Sporting News and United Press International.

In 1969, Costa was the subject of a well-known photograph of him hitting future Hall of Fame New York Jets quarterback Joe Namath in the ribs with such force Namath appeared to be flying backwards. After the game, Costa, who appreciated Namath's importance to every player in the AFL, including himself, was extremely concerned about Namath's physical condition. Costa waited in New York's locker room while Namath was receiving treatment to learn of Namath's condition, expressing that he had no intention of hurting Namath.

In 1970, the Broncos' first year in the NFL's American Football Conference, Costa once more started all 14 games at right tackle for the Broncos. He had nine sacks, third on the team behind Paul Smith (11.5) and Jackson (10). Costa also had three fumble recoveries that season. It has also been reported Costa had 11 sacks and 66 tackles that season. The Broncos were second in the NFL with 50 sacks that season, and gave up the third fewest rushing yards; while setting numerous team defensive records.

Costa played his last season with the Broncos in 1971, again starting all 14 games; but at left defensive tackle that year, with Smith moving to right tackle. Costa had six sacks and three fumble recoveries that season. He also reportedly had 41 tackles and 39 quarterback pressures. Costa reportedly started every Broncos' game during his five-year career in Denver (70), with 10 fumble recoveries and 39.5 sacks.

Lou Saban stepped down as the Broncos' head coach during the 1971 season. Former Stanford University head coach John Ralston became the Broncos' new head coach in 1972. During training camp in 1972, it was reported that either because of contract issues between Costa and the Broncos and/or differences between Costa and Ralston, Costa asked to be traded. Costa's differences with Ralston over Ralston's plans for how he wanted Costa to play were the dominant cause of Costa's request, and Ralston dismissed Costa from the team for a day while finding a trade. Ralston felt that Costa's lack of belief in Ralston's system meant Costa could never give a 100% effort to the Broncos, but he still said "In a sense, though, you have to admire a man like Costa, who comes in and says 'I don't believe in doing things this way' and leaves".

=== San Diego Chargers ===
On August 1, 1972, the Broncos traded Costa to the San Diego Chargers for Eddie Ray and a third-round draft choice. Costa played two years in San Diego (1972 and 1973), starting all 28 games at right defensive tackle for the Chargers. Costa had six sacks for the Chargers in 1972. He recorded the only safety of his professional career in December 1972, when he tackled future Hall of Fame Pittsburgh Steelers' quarterback Terry Bradshaw in the Steelers' endzone, in a 24–2 loss to the Steelers. In 1973, Costa had one fumble recovery and 2.5 sacks. The Chargers traded Costa to the Buffalo Bills for an undisclosed draft choice before the beginning of the 1974 season.

=== Buffalo Bills (1974) ===
After leaving the Broncos, Lou Saban became the Buffalo Bills head coach in 1972. Saban had unsuccessfully attempted to trade for Costa in 1972, shortly after he took over as the Bills new coach; and was finally able to bring Costa to the Bills in 1974. This was Costa's last season in the NFL. He started nine games for the Bills that season. He played defensive end during the first part of the season. The Bills switched to a 3–4 defense later in the 1974 season. Costa had two fumble recoveries and 2.5 sacks that season. The Bills released Costa after the season ended.

=== World Football League ===
In July 1975, Costa signed to play with the Portland Thunder of the World Football League. He left the team during the season as he was being paid so little ($9,000 for 18 games), he did not believe it worthwhile to continue playing.

== Legacy and honors ==
Costa never missed playing in a game during his 12-year AFL/NFL career (168 games) or only missed a game for the first time during his final season in Buffalo. He started 141 games, with 65.5 sacks, 13 fumble recoveries, and one safety. He was the Broncos' defensive captain all five years in Denver, and was also the team's player representative.

In 1996, Costa was inducted into the Westchester Sports Hall of Fame.

== Personal life and death ==
In October 1963, Costa married his wife Lorena (Lori) in Salt Lake City, Utah. Costa was Catholic and Lorena was a Mormon. She had two sons at the time of their marriage. She worked in real estate in Salt Lake City, and on her advice, Costa began investing in real estate at the time. While playing for the Broncos, Costa worked as a banker in Denver during the offseason, and Lori Costa was the vice president of the Hel-Lo Goddess dress shops in Denver.

During the offseason with the Broncos, he coached up to 17 of his teammates on an exhibition basketball team. They played in the Denver area, and elsewhere; including small towns. The team was known as Dave Costa's All Stars (Saban not wanting them to use the Broncos name). Their games would be attended by thousands of people, and after the games the players would sign autographs.

Costa died of leukemia on May 20, 2013.

== See also ==
- List of American Football League players
