= Killing of John Acropolis =

Murdered American labor leader

John "Little Caesar" Acropolis was an American labor leader who was killed on August 26, 1952. He served as president of Local 456 of the International Brotherhood of Teamsters in Westchester County, New York from 1946 until his death.

== Early life ==
Acropolis was orphaned at age three and sent to the Woodycrest Home, where the headmistress changed his last name to Acropolis because she could not pronounce his actual surname, which Acropolis never knew. He was later sent to the Leake and Watts Services orphanage in Yonkers, New York. He was an all-state basketball player at Yonkers High School and helped lead the team to a state championship in 1927. He attended Colgate University where he played on the basketball team. He was the team's leading scorer in 1931–32 and was the team captain during the 1932–33 season. After graduating, Acropolis was a gym teacher at Roosevelt High School and continued his education at New York University and Manhattan College. He served in the United States Navy during World War II. From 1943 to 1945, Acropolis was the head men's basketball coach at Middlebury College.

== International Brotherhood of Teamsters ==
Acropolis became interested in union issues while working as a truck driver during his summer breaks from college. During the 1930s, he campaigned against the leadership of Local 456, which he believed was corrupt. He was elected secretary–treasurer in 1941 and was elected president after leaving the Navy. In 1948, Acropolis was threatened with arrest for enforcing a winter boycott of heating oil trucks. The following year, a Yonkers garbage truck strike ended only after the Condon-Wadlin Act, which prohibited public employees to strike, was invoked by the city. Subsequently, the son of William F. Condon, one of the act's co-sponsors, was beaten by union members in a bar. Acropolis, who was in the bar at the time, claimed to have not seen the attack and was never charged.

== Death ==
Following the garbage strike, Yonkers ended its municipal waste collection and Acropolis convinced the local chamber of commerce to finance a carting company that would only employ Local 456 members. This company, Rex Carting, competed with one owned by Genovese crime family capo Nick Rattenni for garbage contracts. Rex Carting's trucks were burned and businesses the company serviced were looted.

On August 26, 1952, Acropolis was killed in his apartment by an unknown assailant who fired two bullets into his head. It was believed that he had been killed as part of organized crime's takeover of the garbage business in Westchester County, New York. Rattenni was questioned extensively, but never charged. A few weeks after the murder, Rattenni purchased Rex Carting. No arrests were ever made in the case.

In October 2008, the New York Civil Liberties Union filed a lawsuit against the Yonkers, New York Police Department, demanding access to the department's file on the investigation into the death of Acropolis. The City of Yonkers said fought the lawsuit, claiming that because the investigation was still technically active, the case file was not subject to Freedom of Information laws. In March 2009, the city of Yonkers was ordered to turn over its records of the investigation to the NYCLU.

== See also ==
- List of unsolved murders (1900–1979)
