= Rich Ranglin =

American football player (born 1984)

No. 64
- Position: Guard

Personal information
- Born: September 27, 1984 (age 42); Bronx, New York, U.S.
- Listed height: 6 ft 2 in (1.88 m)
- Listed weight: 315 lb (143 kg)

Career information
- High school: Saunders (Yonkers, New York)
- College: Central Connecticut State
- NFL draft: 2007: undrafted

Career history
- Manchester Wolves (2008–2009); Milwaukee Iron (2010); Kansas City Command (2011); San Jose SaberCats (2012); Kansas City Chiefs (2012); San Jose SaberCats (2013–2015)

Awards and highlights
- ArenaBowl champion (2015); 2× AFL Offensive Lineman of the Year (2011, 2014); 4× First-team All-Arena (2011, 2012, 2013, 2014); Second-team All Arena (2015)

Career AFL statistics
- Receptions: 41
- Receiving yards: 598
- Receiving TDs: 10
- Tackles: 2
- Stats at ArenaFan.com
- Stats at Pro Football Reference

Richard Ranglin (born September 27, 1984) is an American former professional football player who was an offensive lineman in the National Football League (NFL) and Arena Football League (AFL). He played college football for the Central Connecticut Blue Devils. He was signed out of the AFL in May 2012 by the Kansas City Chiefs.

== College career ==
Ranglin was a four-year letterman at Central Connecticut State University from 2003 to 2007, He Ranglin earned second-team All-Northeast Conference honors. With Ranglin CCSU won its first two NEC titles in 2004 and 2005, he played in 42 games during his four years with the team. However Ragnlin went undrafted in the 2007 NFL draft.

== Professional career ==
After college Raglin played for several arena football teams, winning Spalding Offensive Lineman of the Year in 2011 while playing all 18 games for the Kansas City Command. In 2012 he began playing for the San Jose SaberCats before signing with the Kansas City Chiefs of the National Football League in May. He was moved between the practice squad and active roster several times during the 2012 season but did not play in any games. He was the first CCSU Football alumni to appear on an NFL teams 53 man roster. Ranglin was released in April 2013.

He resigned with the San Jose SaberCats after his release by the Chiefs and played there until the team folded in the fall of 2015, less than three months after winning ArenaBowl XXVIII

== Personal life ==
His son Kiki Richard Ranglin was born on June 9, 2011, and his daughter Mercy Rae was born on May 26, 2013.
