= Barack Obama School for Social Justice =

Coordinates: 40.941175°N 73.894207°W

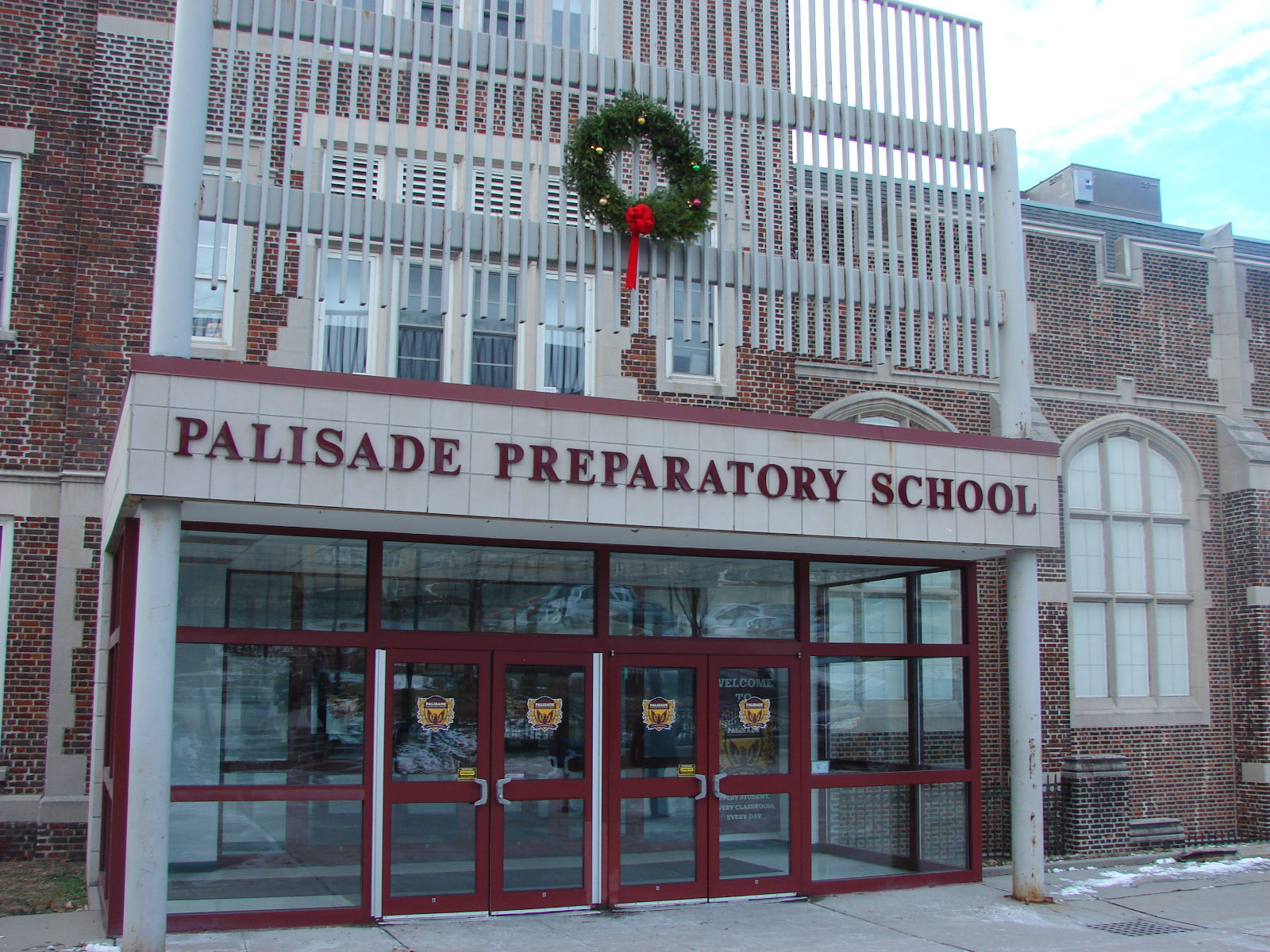
- Old photo of Palisade Preparatory School
- 201 Palisade Avenue, Yonkers, New York 10703

Information
- Type: Public middle high school
- Motto: Obama is my school, Yonkers is my campus.
- Established: 2022
- School district: Yonkers Public Schools
- Principal: Jamell Scott
- Staff: 48.28 (FTE)
- Grades: 7-12
- Enrollment: 780 (2023–24)
- Student to teacher ratio: 16.16
- Color: Maroon
- Mascot: Lightning
- Website: yonkerspublicschools.org/o/obama

Barack Obama School for Social Justice (formerly Palisade Preparatory School, commonly Palisade Prep or PPS) is a public middle and high school in Yonkers, New York, serving grades 7–12. It is operated by Yonkers Public Schools. The school was previously affiliated with the College Board during its years as Palisade Preparatory School. On June 14, 2022, the Yonkers Board of Education voted to rename the school after President Barack Obama, effective for the 2022–23 school year.

== History ==
Palisade Preparatory School was located in the old Yonkers High School of Commerce building (originally Longfellow Junior High School from 1930 to 1938), which became Commerce Middle School. Yonkers Public Schools closed down the middle school in June 2008 due to low academic performance, and along with the College Board, the school was founded. This school was funded by the Bill and Melinda Gates Foundation and the Michael and Susan Dell Foundation for five years.

The founding principal, Michael Angresano, stepped down as principal in June 2011, after serving for three years. Angresano's successor was Michelle P. Yazurlo, Ed.D. from 2011 until 2020. The last principal of the school was Robert P. Vicuña, Ed.D.

Barack Obama School for Social Justice is located in the former Yonkers High School of Commerce building, which originally operated as Longfellow Junior High School from 1930 to 1938 and later as Commerce Middle School. Yonkers Public Schools closed Commerce Middle School in June 2008 due to low academic performance and, in partnership with the College Board, opened Palisade Preparatory School that fall. The school was supported for five years by grants from the Bill and Melinda Gates Foundation and the Michael and Susan Dell Foundation.

Michael Angresano served as the founding principal from 2008 to 2011, followed by Michelle P. Yazurlo, Ed.D., from 2011 to 2020. Robert P. Vicuña, Ed.D., served as principal through the school’s final years under the Palisade Prep name. On June 14, 2022, the Yonkers Board of Education officially renamed the school the Barack Obama School for Social Justice, effective for the 2022–23 school year.

Following the renaming, the school’s new principal became Mr. Jamell Scott, a Yonkers native and alumni of Charles E. Gorton High School, who brought more than a decade of educational experience to the role.

== School theme ==
Under its current name, the Barack Obama School for Social Justice focuses on early-college and career-oriented pathways that reflect its emphasis on community service, public health, and technology. The school offers several P-TECH programs, including Environmental Science and Computer Information Systems, which allow students to earn both a high school diploma and an associate degree. It also operates the Century Honors Emergency Medical Services and Empress Phoenix Cadet Program, providing hands-on EMS training with professional first responders, along with opportunities to earn the New York State CDOS Career Development and Occupational Studies credential.
