= The Black Friend =

Young adult book

- Author: Frederick Joseph
- Language: English
- Genre: Nonfiction
- Publisher: Candlewick Press
- Publication date: December 1, 2020
- Publication place: United States
- Media type: Print (hardcover, paperback), e-book, audiobook
- Pages: 272
- ISBN: 978-1536217018
- OCLC: 1200830284

The Black Friend: On Being a Better White Person is a 2020 young adult book written by Frederick Joseph.

Joseph wrote this book after reflecting on daily microaggressions throughout his life. Writing from the perspective of a friend, Joseph offers candid reflections on his own experiences with racism, as well as conversations with prominent artists and activists about theirs. The Black Friend encourages White people to be thoughtful of their interactions with people of color.

The book discusses racism and social injustice and teaches awareness and knowledge to help people become antiracist. It includes personal experiences, interviews with prominent figures such as Angie Thomas, Toni Tone, and April Reign, references to pop culture and media, and an interactive encyclopedia of racism.

== Critical reception ==
The Black Friend was well-received for its honest and direct approach. Kirkus Reviews praised it as a "smartly researched, well-intentioned provocation to inspire change," particularly for young adults committed to understanding and fighting racism. Booklist awarded the book a starred review, calling it a "hard-hitting resource for action and change."
