= Yonkers Middle High School =

- Mascot of Yonkers Middle High School, the Bulldog

Location
- 150 Rockland Avenue, Yonkers, New York 10705
- 40.926751°N 73.885884°W

Information
- Type: Public Middle/High School
- School district: Yonkers Public Schools
- Principal: Dr. Sandy Hattar
- Staff: 71.68 (FTE)
- Grades: 6-12
- Enrollment: 1,064 (2021–22)
- Student to teacher ratio: 14.84
- Color: Blue Orange
- Athletics: Yonkers Bulldogs
- Mascot: Bulldog
- Website: yonkerspublicschools.org/ymhs

Yonkers Middle High School is located in Yonkers, New York, United States. The school offers the International Baccalaureate program.

== History ==
In 1998, Yonkers High School and Yonkers Middle School merged. Yonkers Middle High School was ranked the 24th best American high school and the 4th best New York State high school in 2012 by U.S. News & World Report.

In 2014, an evacuation was issued for the school after 152 patients were transported from the school to several hospitals after being treated for fumes. Several students displayed pepper spray-like symptoms, respiratory issues, and shortness of breath. The patients were released the next day. The school opened the next day with no incident.

== Activities ==
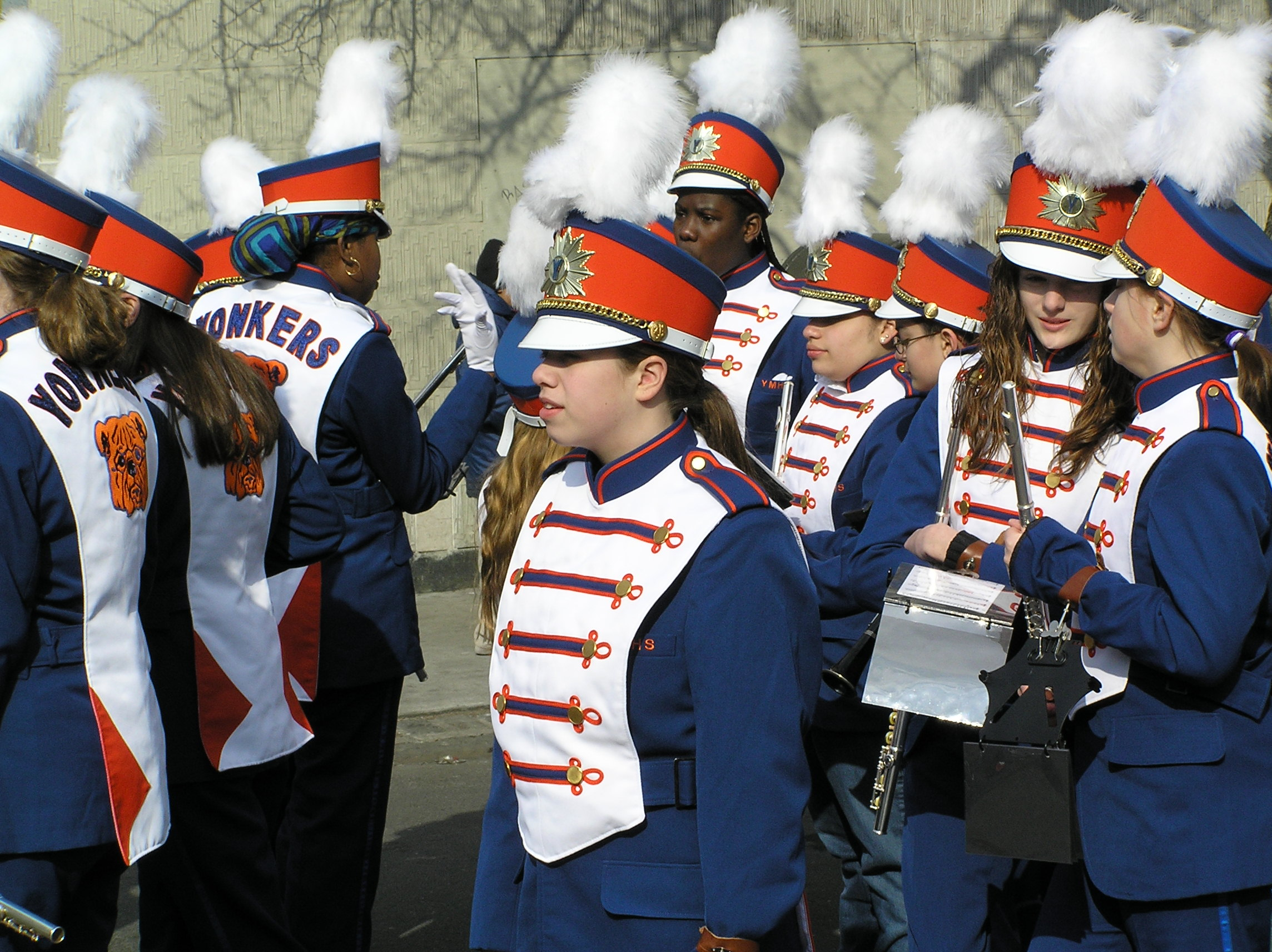
Yonkers Marching Band participates in the 2005 Yonkers Saint Patrick's Day Parade

Yonkers High School offers Advanced Placement courses and participates in the International Baccalaureate program. In line with the IB program, Yonkers High School aims to create a "community of caring learners" by encouraging community service activity among its students. Students at Yonkers High School can graduate with a standard diploma, Regents Diploma, or Advanced Designation. Extracurricular opportunities for students include clubs such as Habitat for Humanity and the Bio-Diversity Club.

== Incidents ==
Yonkers Middle High School has been the subject of a few incidents. On September 29, 2021, an evacuation was issued after a bomb threat was made at the high school. This was the second time in a few days that a school in Westchester County was evacuated due to an unfounded threat. Students later returned to class after no threat was found.

On January 6, 2023, a 16-year-old student was stabbed and assaulted in the bathroom of the school following a dispute over a young woman. Police said that they charged two suspects, who were two 17-year old male students. The two students were charged with second-degree attempted murder and assault. A video of the assault was recorded by a student who witnessed the incident, and was later released on YouTube.

== Alumni ==
Alumni include the actor and comic Sid Caesar, animator Arthur Davis, and John Howard Northrop, recipient of the 1946 Nobel Prize in Chemistry.
