= Ruth Apilado =

American novelist and campaigner (1908–2021)

- Born: Ruth Mosselle Mays; April 30, 1908; Chicago, Illinois, U.S.
- Died: August 15, 2021 (aged 113 years, 107 days); Federal Way, Washington, U.S.
- Education: Chicago State University
- Occupations: Newspaper editor; novelist; anti-racism campaigner for African American civil rights; magazine founder; teacher
- Known for: Founder of America Intercultural Magazine
- Spouse: Inosencio Apilado
- Children: 1
- Relatives: Lu Palmer (second cousin)

Ruth Moselle Apilado (née Mays; April 30, 1908 – August 15, 2021) was an American newspaper editor, novelist, anti-racism campaigner for African American civil rights, magazine founder, teacher, and supercentenarian who founded America's Intercultural Magazine (AIM). Born during the Jim Crow era, she was an African American anti-racism activist for civil and political rights.

== Early life ==
Apilado was born on April 30, 1908, in Chicago, Illinois. Her parents were Stewart and Clara (née Whetsel) Mays. Her maternal grandmother had emigrated from Canada to Ohio, and was partly indigenous. Her paternal great-grandfather was a slave owner in Virginia.

Apilado attended McKinley High School, which closed in 1954. She became a teacher in 1928, after graduating from Chicago Normal College (now Chicago State University).

== Newspaper publishing and novel ==
She began her journalistic career in 1942, when she briefly worked as an editor for the newly created Negro Youth Photo Scripts Magazine. In 1945, she wrote a letter to the editor expressing her criticism of Richard Wright's memoir Black Boy, stating that it was an inaccurate depiction of the typical childhood of African-Americans. In 1950, Apilado published a novel called The Joneses, which was about the hardships of a black family living in Chicago.

== Magazine founder ==
After retiring from teaching in 1973, Apilado founded America's Intercultural Magazine (AIM), a quarterly-published journal that set out to "bridge the gap between races, cultures, and religions." Already in 1948, an initiative of creating such a journal (called Freedom Press) took place, when she requested the newspaper Berkeley Daily Gazette to assist her and her associates with marketing. Her anti-racism stance was reflected in the editorials that she wrote; for example, she praised the activist and church leader Willa Saunders Jones in 1975. On June 16, 1990, she participated as a panelist at a writers' conference in Elgin Community College in Illinois.

== Personal life ==
Apilado's husband was Filipino-American Inosencio Apilado. Their son, Myron Apilado, was the vice-president of minority affairs at University of Washington until the year 2000, as well as an editor of AIM. On August 26, 2004, at age 96, she was interviewed by Larry Crowe of The History Makers, a project that produces oral history material by African-Americans. Her second cousin was the reporter, newspaper journalist and radio host Lu Palmer. She turned 113 years old in April 2021 and died on 15 August later that year.
