= Riverside High School for Engineering and Design =

Coordinates: 40.95555°N 73.896157°W

Riverside High School
- Riverside High School
- 565 Warburton Avenue; Yonkers, New York 10701

Information
- Type: Public High School
- Established: 2007
- School district: Yonkers Public Schools
- Principal: Mr. William Shaggura
- Staff: 60.00 (FTE)
- Grades: 9-12
- Enrollment: 951 (2017–18)
- Student to teacher ratio: 15.85
- Color: Red Black
- Athletics: Riverside Rams
- Mascot: Ram
- Website: https://www.yonkerspublicschools.org/riverside

Riverside High School for Engineering and Design, Yonkers' sixth public high school, opened to 9th grade students in September 2007. Also known as RED (Riverside Engineering and Design), the school aims to be environmentally friendly.

Its first graduating class was the class of 2011. The building was originally constructed in 1990 and opened in 1992 as Museum Middle School.
