= Thérèse Adloff =

French Resistance fighter (1904–2005)

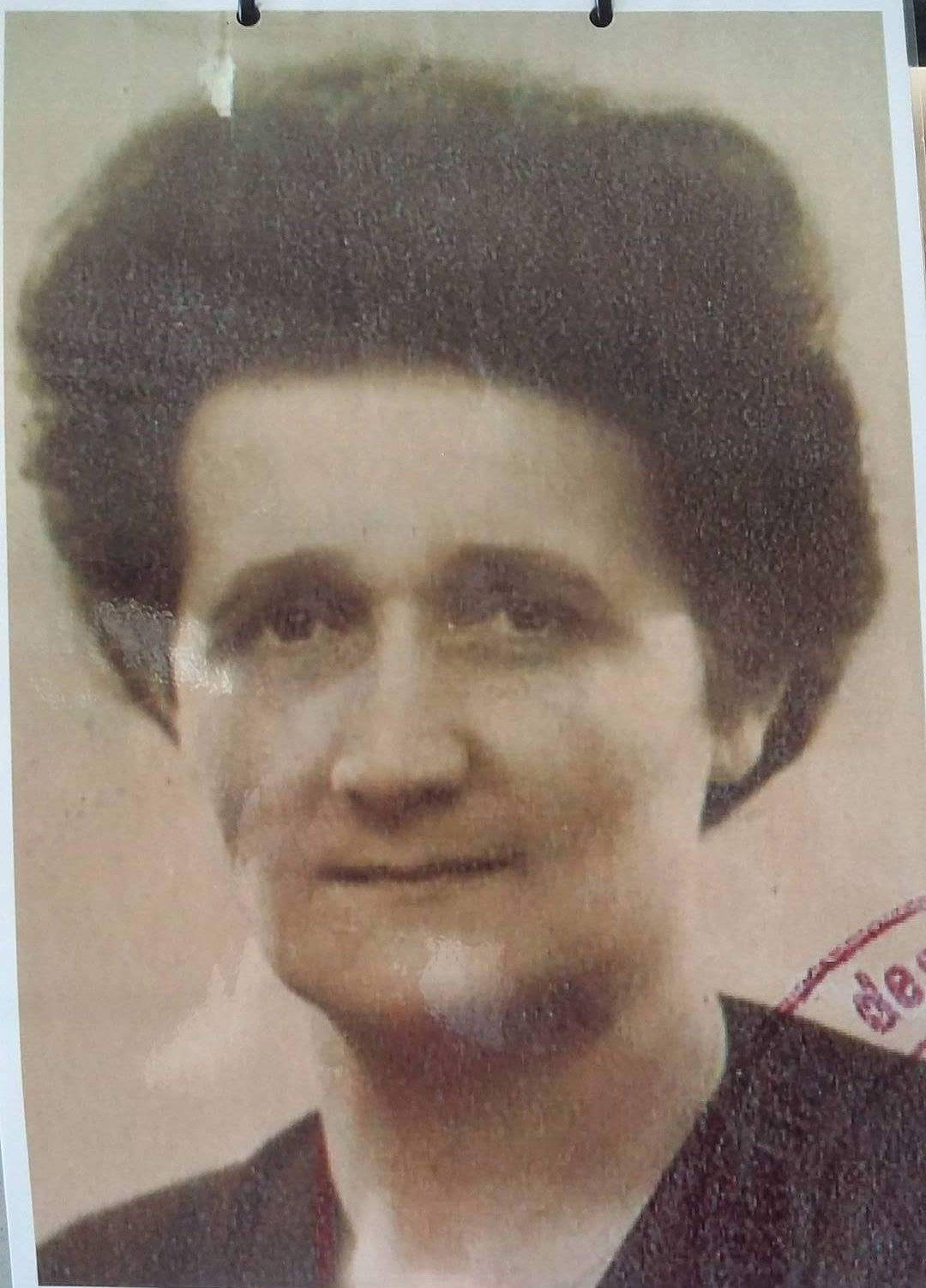
- Born: Thérèse Maria Chaudron; 10 November 1904; Badonviller (Meurthe-et-Moselle), France
- Died: 4 December 2005 (aged 101); Oberhausbergen (Bas-Rhin), France
- Known for: French Resistance
- Spouse: Alphonse Adloff (m. 1922)
- Awards: Officier of the Legion of Honour; Médaille militaire; Médaille de la résistance; Croix de guerre 1939–1945 with palms

Thérèse Maria Adloff (née Chaudron; 10 November 1904, in Badonviller, Meurthe-et-Moselle – 4 December 2005, in Oberhausbergen, Bas-Rhin) was a member of the French Resistance in World War II who helped people evade the Nazis.

== Biography ==
A worker in the Badon faience factory, aged 18, she married Alphonse Adloff on 16 December 1922, and became manager of the Badon brasserie via her husband, who already held that job.

World War I have made a lasting impression, she joined the Resistance and, from the beginning of German occupation, provided shelter and support for hundreds of people evading the concentration camps. She provided false documentation and clothes and sent them on the "evasion route" of Donon and Grande-Fontaine, saving hundreds of lives.

She was arrested in August 1942 and went to several concentration camps like Mauthausen and Ravensbrück. When she was freed in April 1945 by the Red Cross, she only weighed 30 kilograms (66 lb).

== Awards ==
- Officier of the Legion of Honour
- Médaille militaire
- Médaille de la résistance
- Croix de guerre 1939–1945 with palms
