= Union democracy =

Union democracy refers to the governance of trade unions, as well as the protection of the rights and interests of individual members. Modern usage of the term has focused on the extent to which election procedures ensure that the executives of a union most accurately represent the interests of the members.

== Theory ==
In 1911, a German sociologist, Robert Michels propounded a view that all democratic organisations were prone to become oligarchies because of the growth and size of modern organisations, the need for specialisation of officials, and the necessity that this division of labour would lead the rank and file to struggle to understand the activities of their leaders. Michels argued that this amounted to an iron law of oligarchy: all groups, regardless of how democratic they may be at the start, eventually and inevitably develop into oligarchies with swollen bureaucracies.

Michels himself, after falling out with the German Social Democrat Party, migrated to Italy and joined Mussolini's Fascist Party. Nevertheless, his ideas were popularized after the Second World War in particular by Seymour Martin Lipset, Trow, and James Samuel Coleman in a book entitled, Union Democracy: The Internal Politics of the International Typographical Union (1957). This book argued that the ITU was an exception to Michels' general law, and that the conditions necessary to ensure democracy were that an opposition to the union's leadership could form. This depended on ensuring the leadership did not monopolize the channels of communication with members.

Lipset and his coauthors confined their understanding of "democracy" to the existence of organised opposition. They were skeptical that the conditions in the ITU, which made it democratic, were likely to arise in many other unions spontaneously.

Following this, in 1959, the US federal government passed the Landrum-Griffin Act 1959 to mandate democratic principles be followed in union governance.

== Law ==
- International Labour Organization, Freedom of Association Convention (1948) No 87
- US Labor Management Reporting and Disclosure Act 1959
- UK Trade Union Act 1984, now in the Trade Union and Labour Relations (Consolidation) Act 1992 s 72

== Principles ==
Principles include:

- Frequent, contested elections, with rank-and-file members regularly challenging incumbents, and resultant turnover in officers and representatives, with all candidates having equal access to membership lists before elections, including the right to copy the list.
- Open publications, with newsletters and websites publishing all members' views, including those critical of officials, representatives, or union policy, and the union encouraging open and free debate and discussion of issues and candidates; with election candidates having equal use of union publications and means of communication (website, newsletter, e-mail list) to put out their campaign material.
- Member ratification, with all contracts and "side agreements" between union and management subject to ratification by secret ballot by the members covered by the contract.
- Strike votes: members should vote on striking, on return to work, and on other decisions during strikes, with strike votes not used to force members to ratify contracts ("either you vote 'yes' or you vote to strike").
- "Informed vote": the complete text of proposed contract changes, amendments, referendums, etc. should be distributed to members prior to ratification votes, with sufficient time for meaningful membership review and discussion, and the union circulating (or at least not obstructing) different opinions about the contract offer.
- Election of representatives: shop stewards, business agents and other member representatives (paid or otherwise) should be elected by secret ballot of the members they represent, and subject to recall by the members they represent; stewards and active members should be trained in legal rights and organizing; and there should be stewards' councils that meet to plan and coordinate action.
- Grievants' rights: workers should participate fully in the grievance process at every step, with full information about their case and its progress.
- Member access to information: union representatives should provide members current and complete copies of the contract and the union constitution/bylaws, and the contract and constitution should be published on union websites. Members must have easy access to information on officers' salaries, budget, and expenses. Union representatives should regularly inform members of their rights under national and local law, and how to enforce them, including rights and responsibilities under the relevant regulations.
- Regular local meetings, to be at least quarterly, announced ahead of time, at a time and place convenient to members, with an agenda circulated in advance, under reasonable quorum requirements not set so high as to prevent valid membership meetings. Real business should be conducted (not just a pep rally), with members encouraged to speak, make proposals, vote, and ask questions, and meeting minutes available to all members afterwards.
- Independent organizing and communication outside union official structure: members should have the right to organize in independent committees and caucuses, publish rank-and-file newsletters and websites, and run candidates for union office, and union officers should encourage this.
- Inclusion and equality: all members should be treated fairly, with the union fighting discrimination by management and among members. Union officers and representatives should reflect membership in terms of gender, race, language, craft or bargaining unit, seniority, etc. Union contracts, constitution and bylaws, meetings, and publications should be accessible in the languages spoken by members.
- Education for members: unions should train all interested members in legal rights and organizing, including how to participate effectively in the union and how to organize on the job.

While there are some superficial similarities to the so-called organizing model of union activity, advocates of union democracy are swift to point out that many of the alleged exemplars of the organizing model do not, in their internal structure, meet the requirements listed above.

== See also ==
- Association for Union Democracy
- Labor Notes
- Miners for Democracy
- Teamsters for a Democratic Union
