= America's Intercultural Magazine =

American magazine

- Categories: Literary magazine
- Frequency: Quarterly
- Founder: Ruth Apilado
- Founded: 1973
- Final issue: 2007
- Country: United States
- Based in: Chicago, Illinois
- Language: English

America's Intercultural Magazine (abbreviated AIM) was a magazine established in 1973 with the intent of working against racism, discrimination, and bigotry in the United States. Ruth Apilado founded AIM in 1973 after retiring from teaching. Published four times a year, it offered scholarships through literary competitions whose contents align with the ideals of AIM. It discontinued in 2007.
