= Labor Management Reporting and Disclosure Act of 1959 =

United States labor law

Labor Management Reporting and Disclosure Act
- Long title: An act to provide for the reporting and disclosure of certain financial transactions and administrative practices of labor organizations and employers, to prevent abuses in the administration of trusteeships by labor organizations, to provide standards with respect to the election of officers of labor organizations, and for other purposes.
- Acronyms (colloquial): LMRDA
- Nicknames: Landrum–Griffin Act
- Enacted by: the 86th United States Congress

Citations
- Public law: Pub. L. 86–257
- Statutes at Large: 73 Stat. 519

Codification
- Titles amended: 29 U.S.C.: Labor
- U.S.C. sections created: 29 U.S.C. ch. 11 §§ 401-531

Legislative history
- Introduced in the Senate as S. 1555 on March 25, 1959; Committee consideration by Labor and Public Welfare; Passed the Senate on April 25, 1959 (90-1); Signed into law by President Dwight D. Eisenhower on September 14, 1959

The Labor Management Reporting and Disclosure Act of 1959 (also LMRDA or the Landrum–Griffin Act), is a US labor law that regulates labor unions' internal affairs and their officials' relationships with employers.

== Background ==
After enactment of the Taft–Hartley Act in 1947, the number of union victories in National Labor Relations Board (NLRB)-conducted elections declined. During the 12-year administration of the Wagner Act, which was enacted in 1935, unions won victories in over 80 percent of elections. But in the first year after passage of the Taft–Hartley Act in 1947, unions won only around 70 percent of the representation elections conducted by the agency.

During the mid-to-late 1950s, the labor movement was under intense Congressional scrutiny for corruption, racketeering, and other misconduct. Revelations of corruption and undemocratic practices in the International Brotherhood of Teamsters, International Longshoremen's Association, United Mine Workers and other unions received widespread attention. The LMRDA, enacted in 1959, required unions to hold secret elections for local union offices on a regular basis and provided for review by the United States Department of Labor of union members' claims of improper election activity. Organized labor opposed the act because it strengthened the Taft–Hartley Act of 1947.

The LMRDA was sponsored by Democrat Phil Landrum and Republican Robert P. Griffin. The drafting was assisted by Clyde Summers.

== Content ==
Important provisions of the law were as follows:

- Unions had to hold secret elections, reviewable by the Department of Labor.
- Union members are protected against abuses by a bill of rights including guarantees of freedom of speech and periodic secret elections of officers.
- Members of the Communist Party and convicted felons were barred from holding union office. The bar on Communist Party members was ruled unconstitutional in 1965 in the case United States v. Brown.
- Unions had to submit annual financial reports to the DOL.
- Every union officer must act as a fiduciary in handling the assets and conducting the affairs of the union.
- Unions' power to put subordinate bodies (chapters or locals) in trusteeship, a temporary suspension of democratic processes within a union, was limited.
- Minimum standards were set before a union could expel or take other disciplinary action against a member of the union.

The LMRDA covers both workers and unions covered by the National Labor Relations Act ("Wagner Act") and workers and unions in the railroad and airline industries, who are covered by the Railway Labor Act. The LMRDA does not, as a general rule, cover public sector employees, who are not covered by either the NLRA or the RLA. The LMRDA likewise does not displace state laws governing unions' relations with their members except to the extent that those state laws would conflict with federal law.

In the legislation that created the LMRDA, Congress also amended the National Labor Relations Act to tighten the Taft–Hartley Act's prohibitions against secondary boycotts and prohibiting certain types of "hot cargo" agreements, under which an employer agreed to cease doing business with other employers, and empowered the General Counsel of the National Labor Relations Board to seek an injunction against a union that engages in recognitional picketing of an employer for more than thirty days without filing a petition for representation with the NLRB.

Union members may enforce their LMRDA rights through private lawsuits or, in some cases, through the Department of Labor's Office of Labor-Management Standards.

== Subsequent operation ==
Twenty years after the passage of the Act, co-sponsor Senator Robert Griffin wrote,

... [T]he Landrum–Griffin Act has played a significant role in enabling union members to participate more freely in the affairs of their unions. On the other hand, it cannot be said that union corruption and abuses of union power have disappeared. But such conduct in the union movement is not as common as it was twenty years ago; and, in large measure, that can be credited to the existence of the Landrum–Griffin Act.

Griffin acknowledged the shortcomings, particularly with regard to the Teamsters. However, Griffin argued that the violations were contrary to the Act, placing the blame instead on the Department of Labor for failing to pursue action against the Teamsters for its corruption.

=== Voting ===
The Act stressed for union members to be guaranteed, as part of a Bill of Rights, the right to a secret ballot on certain issues facing the union at large. However, in naming certain aspects of union function, such as dues, constitution, bylaws, membership, and not others, the Act opened the door for abuses. For instance, a vote on the union constitution would require that each member have the right to see the proposed changes, distribute information in support or opposition thereof, and have their union bound by the result of the election. However, if a ratification vote was not under one of these named clauses, the protections did not apply under the Act, and union officials could act as they saw fit, regardless of the sentiment of general membership.

=== Collective bargaining ===
Likewise, the Act addressed the issue of collective bargaining but only in externalities such as reporting thereof. It did not address the question of whether such agreements required any consent from the union members or locals. Furthermore, in allowing for trusteeship in such instances, the Act allowed for union officials to exert greater control over the will of their members. In one court case on the matter, an Oklahoma City local attempted to leave one union body to affiliate with another. The original union put it under trusteeship to block the transfer, and the court upheld the move as legal under the Act. As law professor Alan Hyde put it, "the courts advance democratic bargaining only when assured that such democracy will not disadvantage more fundamental policy interests, such as harmony between employers and 'unions' (read union elites) or control of inflation."

=== Pensions ===
With regard to retiree pensions, among other secondary issues, the Act did nothing to close the loophole created by the National Labor Relations Act to allow such 'permissive' or 'not mandatory' items from being dealt with by a union employer unilaterally, a right which was upheld by the Supreme Court as late as 1971 in Allied Chemical Workers Local 1 v. Pittsburgh Plate Glass Company. Likewise, in 1980, the Supreme Court affirmed the right of union international offices to negotiate a pension plan in conflict with that supported by the members when union bylaws allowed for approval by international.

=== Persuader rule ===
President Barack Obama invoked the Act to issue the "persuader rule", which required employers and their consultants to publicly disclose when the consultants provided legal advice for countering unionization. The National Federation of Independent Business sued and, on November 16, 2016, U.S. District Judge Samuel Ray Cummings issued a permanent nationwide injunction blocking the Persuader Rule, finding it was not authorized by the Act, and that it violated the First Amendment to the United States Constitution.

== See also ==
- US labor law
- National Labor Relations Act of 1935, the "Wagner Act"
- Taft–Hartley Act (Labor Management Relations Act of 1947)
- List of United States federal legislation
