= Thomas C. Snyder =

American politician (1843–1906)

Member of the Ohio Senate from the 21st district
- In office 1888–1890
- Preceded by: Silas A. Conrad
- Succeeded by: Anthony Howells

Member of the Ohio House of Representatives from the Stark County district
- In office 1880–1884 Serving with Silas A. Conrad
- Preceded by: Daniel Worley and Richard G. Williams
- Succeeded by: Leander C. Cole and John McBride

Personal details
- Born: Thomas Crum Snyder; March 19, 1843 Trumbull County, Ohio, U.S.
- Died: August 5, 1906 (aged 63) Cleveland, Ohio, U.S.
- Resting place: Canton, Ohio, U.S.
- Party: Republican
- Spouse: Edith Holbrook (m. 1886, divorced)
- Occupation: Politician; businessman; educator
- Military career
- Branch: Union Army
- Service years: 1861–1865
- Rank: First sergeant
- Units: 41st Ohio; 171st Regulars; 177th Ohio
- Conflicts: American Civil War; Battle of Cynthiana (POW); Shelbyville Pike; Siege of Nashville; Battle of Town Creek

Thomas Crum Snyder (March 19, 1843 – August 5, 1906) was an American politician from Ohio. He served as a member of the Ohio House of Representatives, representing Stark County from 1880 to 1884. He was a member of the Ohio Senate from 1888 to 1890.

== Early life ==
Thomas Crum Snyder was born on March 19, 1843, at the Snyder farm in Hartford, Trumbull County, Ohio, to Anna (née Crow) and John Snyder. His parents were farmers and he grew up on the farm. Snyder attended common schools and the Hartford Academy.

== Career ==
Snyder enlisted as a private with Company A of the 41st Ohio Infantry Regiment on August 18, 1861. He was later appointed corporal. After a few months, he became sick with pneumonia and was hospitalized in Louisville, Kentucky, and was moved to Nelsonville, Ohio. He was discharged due to disability within a year of his enlistment on June 12, 1862. He then moved to Vienna, Ohio, where his father moved after the death of his mother. Snyder taught school and purchased army horses. In 1864, he re-enlisted with the 171st Regulars. He served 120 days, and was taken prisoner at the Battle of Cynthiana and subsequently released. He was discharged in August 1864. He re-enlisted with Company G of the 177th Ohio Infantry Regiment on September 6, 1864. He remained with the 177th until the end of the Civil War, participating in the engagement at Shelbyville Pike, Siege of Nashville, and Battle of Town Creek. He attained the rank of first sergeant by the time of his discharge on June 24, 1865.

After returning to Vienna after the war, Snyder farmed and continued teaching. He speculated in oil, which led to financial troubles. He continued teaching until 1869. He then leased land in Trumbull County and Mercer County, Pennsylvania, for coal mining. He operated those lands until 1872. In 1872, he moved to Waynesburg in Stark County, Ohio. He operated coal lands in Waynesburg under Rich Hill Mining Company until the spring of 1873. He then bought coal mines and operated them until he left the coal business in 1876 or 1877. His investments in mining led to financial problems.

Snyder then started the T. C. Snyder & Company in Waynesburg to manufacture sheet iron roofing. In January 1880, he moved his business to Canton. In Canton, he founded the business Canton Steel Roofing Company. He was also director of the Ohio Building, Loan & Investment Company.

Snyder was a Republican. While in Waynesburg, Snyder served as justice of the peace for four years. He resigned that post when he was elected to the state legislature. He served as a member of the Ohio House of Representatives, representing Stark County from 1880 to 1884. He served as a member of the Ohio Senate, representing the 21st district from 1888 to 1890. While a member of the state legislature, he helped pass revised laws for mining and a vitriol law.

== Personal life ==
Snyder married Edith Holbrook, daughter of Ohio state legislator George W. Holbrook, in June 1886. They later divorced. They had one son and daughter, Thomas C. Jr. and Lucile.

On October 6, 1883, Snyder was in a buggy accident that caused injury to his hip that required him to use crutches for the remainder of his life.

Snyder died on August 5, 1906, at the city hospital in Cleveland. He was buried in Canton.
