= Clive Holmes =

Clive Holmes may refer to:

- Clive Holmes (businessman), founder of the Life Insurance Association
- Clive Holmes (historian), English historian
