= R. Nelson Nash =

American author and creator of the Infinite Banking Concept

- Born: March 15, 1931; Greensboro, Georgia, U.S.
- Died: March 27, 2019 (aged 88); Birmingham, Alabama, U.S.
- Occupations: Author, financial educator, life insurance agent
- Known for: Infinite Banking Concept
- Notable work: Becoming Your Own Banker

Robert Nelson Nash (March 15, 1931 – March 27, 2019) was an American life insurance agent and author. He developed the Infinite Banking Concept (IBC), a financial strategy involving the use of dividend-paying whole life insurance policies for personal financing. He described the approach in his 2000 book Becoming Your Own Banker and founded the Nelson Nash Institute to provide education on the concept.

== Biography ==
Nash was born on March 15, 1931, in Greene County, Georgia, and was raised in Athens, Georgia. He graduated from the University of Georgia in 1952 with a Bachelor of Science degree in forestry. After completing his undergraduate studies, he married Mary Edwards Williams, with whom he had three children. From 1952 to 1954, he served in the United States Air Force as an aerial photo interpreter. He later joined the North Carolina Army National Guard as a pilot and served for approximately 30 years, earning the Master Army Aviator designation.

In 1963, Nash relocated to Birmingham, Alabama. In 1964, he entered the life insurance industry and worked as a life insurance agent for more than three decades, representing companies including Equitable Life Assurance Society and Guardian Life Insurance Company. He earned the Chartered Life Underwriter (CLU) designation and qualified as a lifetime member of the Million Dollar Round Table, a professional association of insurance and financial services professionals.

Nash was a member of the First Baptist Church of Birmingham for many years. He died on March 27, 2019, in Birmingham, Alabama, at the age of 88.

== Career and Infinite Banking Concept ==
In the late 20th century, Nash developed the Infinite Banking Concept (IBC), a personal finance strategy that involves the use of the cash value of dividend-paying whole life insurance policies for financing purposes. He stated that he formulated the concept in the early 1980s in response to high interest rates on bank loans. He later outlined the approach in his self-published book Becoming Your Own Banker (2000).

Following the publication of the book, Nash conducted seminars in the United States and Canada on the Infinite Banking Concept. In 2013, he was involved in the establishment of the Nelson Nash Institute, an organization created to provide education on the IBC strategy. The institute developed a practitioner program for financial professionals. Nash also authored a follow-up book, Building Your Warehouse of Wealth, and co-authored The Case for IBC (2018) with L. Carlos Lara and Robert P. Murphy.

== Reception and criticism ==
The Infinite Banking Concept has received both support and criticism within financial advisory and consumer finance discussions. Supporters state that the strategy may provide policyholders with access to liquidity and certain tax advantages associated with whole life insurance policies. Critics argue that whole life insurance policies typically involve higher premiums than term insurance and may not be suitable for all consumers.

Some personal finance commentators, including Dave Ramsey, have criticized the concept and described it as misleading. Financial professionals have also noted that borrowing against a policy's cash value can reduce the death benefit and, if not managed properly, may result in policy lapse or tax consequences.

== Selected works ==
Nash, R. Nelson. Becoming Your Own Banker. Nelson Nash Institute, 2000. ISBN 978-0972631617.

Nash, R. Nelson. Building Your Warehouse of Wealth. Nelson Nash Institute, 2011. ISBN 978-0963225665.

Nash, R. Nelson; Lara, L. Carlos; Murphy, Robert P. The Case for IBC. Nelson Nash Institute, 2018.

== See also ==
- Whole life insurance
- Austrian School
