= Clive Holmes (businessman) =

British businessman (born 1939)

Clive Jefferson Holmes (born August 1939) was the founder of the Life Insurance Association and the co-founder of the Institute of Financial Planning

== Career ==
Holmes entered the financial services business in 1964 at a west London firm of insurance brokers. In 1966 he joined Abbey Life where he spent twenty years as a salesman and manager. He has cited seeing Ben Feldman speak at the 1971 Million Dollar Round Table conference as a key event in his life. In 1972 he founded the Life Insurance Association and in 1987 he was the co-founder of the Institute of Financial Planning.

In 2001 Holmes was appointed a non-executive director of Clifford Lockyer's now defunct Berkeley Berry Birch (BBB) but resigned shortly thereafter citing problems to do with his residency in the Republic of Ireland. The failure of BBB was partly attributed to problems with their regulator, the Financial Services Authority, arising from training of the BBB salesforce carried out by Holmes. BBB was publicly censured by the FSA over the misselling of whole of life policies and regular savings plans between 2001 and 2004. Holmes roundly denied that his training was the cause of misselling problems at BBB, citing compliance problems as the cause instead.

More recently Holmes was chairman of The Gateway Consortium Limited (Reg. No. 05001345), a company which was placed in liquidation in 2011 after an unexpected VAT bill for £400,000 on commission it received for the marketing of unregulated collective investment schemes (UCIS) to financial advisers.

== Outside business ==
Holmes is a trainer and master practitioner of Neuro Linguistic Programming. In 2006 he graduated from the Open University with a degree in history and has embarked on a PhD. He lives in Ireland at Comeragh House, Mahon Bridge, County Waterford, former home of explorer John Palliser.
