= Clifford Lockyer =

British businessman (born 1949)

Clifford Philip Lockyer
- Born: September 1949 (age 76); United Kingdom
- Occupation: Businessman
- Known for: Former Chief Executive of the defunct financial service company Berkeley Berry Birch

Clifford Philip Lockyer (born September 1949) is a British businessman who is the former Chief Executive of the now defunct Berkeley Berry Birch plc (BBB) financial services group which collapsed in 2006. The company had a shortall in its capital adequacy of £11 million, but after two years of investigation this was shown to be shortfall of only £20,000.

== Career ==
Lockyer had worked in the financial services industry since the 1970s. In 1984 he qualified as a "Top of the Table" member of the insurance sales organisation the Million Dollar Round Table.

=== The Berkeley group ===
Lockyer first founded a financial advisory firm under the Berkeley name in 1982. This subsequently grew into the Berkley Berry Birch Group following a reverse takeover of the ailing Berry Birch & Noble group, which was quoted on the London Stock Exchange.

Following trading problems and an investigation by the Financial Services Authority (FSA) into the firm's business practices, BBB was placed in Administration in 2006. The Administration of the company continues as of 2010.

Reports in the financial trade press that Lockyer was able to run a helicopter and that it was initially registered to the Eaton House head office of BBB in Coventry caused some press comment, bearing in mind the poor state of BBB's finances. Lockyer replied that the helicopter was personally owned and run.

== Retirement ==
Following the collapse of BBB, Lockyer announced that he was retiring from the Financial Services industry and he is now shown as inactive on the FSA database.

In 2009, Lockyer, along with several others, was attacked by a former policeman with a stake who was suffering from a mental illness. According to reports, the man confronted Lockyer and ordered him to "repent". Lockyer being trained to black belt in Wing Chun, Shotokan, Shaolin Boxing and Karate was able to defend himself with minimal injuries until the police took over. In press reports Lockyer is referred to as the Lord of the manor but of which Manor is not stated.

== See also ==
- Clive Holmes
