= Ellis Johnson =

Ellis Johnson may refer to:

== People ==
- Ellis N. Johnson Jr. (1826–1902), American politician and educator from Ohio
- Ellis Johnson (baseball) (1892–1965), pitcher in Major League Baseball
- Ellis T. Johnson (1910–1990), American college football coach
- Ellis L. Johnson (1938–2024), American industrial engineer and mathematician
- Ellis Johnson (American football, born 1943) (1943–2026), American football halfback and wide receiver
- Ellis Johnson (American football coach) (born 1951), American football coach
- Ellis Johnson (defensive lineman) (born 1973), American football defensive tackle

== Other ==
- Ellis Johnson Arena, arena in Morehead, Kentucky
- Ellis Johnson (Brookside), a character from the British television series Brookside
