= Daniel Worley =

American politician and Lutheran pastor (1829–1888)

Member of the Ohio House of Representatives from the Stark County district
- In office 1878–1880 Serving with Richard G. Williams
- Preceded by: Richard G. Williams and Johnson Sherrick
- Succeeded by: Thomas C. Snyder and Silas A. Conrad

Personal details
- Born: February 28, 1829 Harrisburg, Pennsylvania, U.S.
- Died: April 29, 1888 (aged 59) Canton, Ohio, U.S.
- Resting place: Columbus, Ohio, U.S.
- Party: Whig; Democratic
- Spouse: Henrietta Schmidt (m. 1852)
- Children: 2
- Education: Pennsylvania College; Capital University
- Occupation: Politician; educator; Lutheran pastor

Daniel Worley (February 28, 1829 – April 29, 1888) was an American politician and Lutheran pastor from Ohio. He served as a member of the Ohio House of Representatives, representing Stark County from 1878 to 1880.

== Early life ==
Daniel Worley was born on February 28, 1829, in Harrisburg, Pennsylvania, to Mary and Thomas Worley. His ancestors were Moravians settlers in Pennsylvania. He attended public schools and the Harrisburg Academy. He graduated from Pennsylvania College (later Gettysburg College) in 1850. Worley graduated from Capital University in Columbus, Ohio, in 1852. In 1855, he was ordained a minister of the Lutheran Church.

== Career ==
Worley worked as a tutor at Capital University for two years and then served as chair of mathematics and natural science. He was professor there for 11 years. During this time, he was appointed principal at Columbus High School, after the resignation of Dr. Asa D. Lord in 1854 and served in that role until his resignation on November 13, 1855. He also served as editor of the religious publication Lutheran Standard from February 17, 1860, to March 15, 1864. In 1863, he left Capital University to head an academy in Greensburg, Pennsylvania, for one year. Elected on June 13, 1865, he started as superintendent of schools of the school district in Canton in September 1865. He remained in that role until 1876. He then established a private school in Canton on May 1, 1877. He taught in that school until 1881.

While professor at Capital University, Worley was on the ballot for state legislature and U.S. Congress as a Whig, but lost. Worley later became a Democrat. He served as a member of the Ohio House of Representatives, representing Stark County from 1878 to 1880. He was a member of the committee on public schools and the committee on the codification of school laws. He was a member of the city council of Canton and on the board of trustees of the waterworks. From 1876 to 1877, Worley was president of the city council of Canton. In April 1888, he was re-elected as president of the city council. He also worked as a Lutheran pastor.

Later in life, Worley worked as a deputy auditor.

== Personal life ==
Worley married Henrietta Schmidt (or Smith) on November 2, 1852. She was the daughter of William Schmidt (or Smith), president of Capital University and Lutheran clergyman. They had two children. Their son William "Willie" Richard Worley was president of the Steiner Coal Company in Canton. He lived in Canton.

Worley died April 29, 1888, at his home in Canton. He was buried in Columbus.
