= Curtis C. Williams =

American politician and judge (1861–1942)

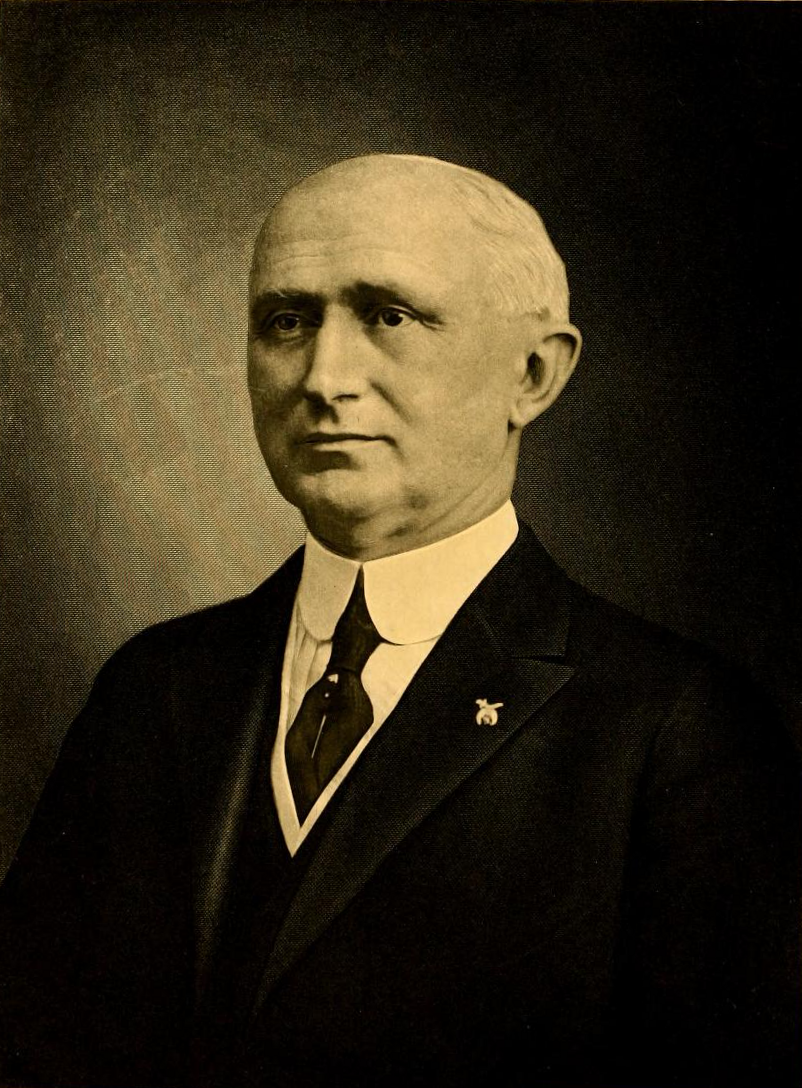
- Williams in a 1920 publication

Personal details
- Born: Curtis Chandler Williams; August 13, 1861 Hanoverton, Ohio, U.S.
- Died: April 2, 1942 (aged 80) Columbus, Ohio, U.S.
- Party: Democratic
- Spouse: Margaret Owen (m. 1893)
- Children: 5
- Parent: Richard G. Williams (father)
- Relatives: Joseph F. Williams (grandfather)
- Education: Mount Union College (AB, AM)
- Occupation: Politician; judge; lawyer; educator

Curtis Chandler Williams (August 13, 1861 – April 2, 1942) was an American politician and judge from Ohio.

== Early life ==
Curtis Chandler Williams was born on August 13, 1861, in Hanoverton, Ohio, to Elmira (née Frost) and Richard G. Williams. His father and grandfather Joseph F. Williams were both Ohio state legislators. He grew up in Alliance and attended high school there. He graduated from Mount Union College in 1883. He had Bachelor of Arts and Master of Arts degrees from Mount Union College. Later he moved to Columbus and studied law with Converse, Booth & Keating. He was admitted to the bar in 1886.

== Career ==
After graduating, Williams worked as a teacher and became superintendent of schools. After getting admitted to the bar, he practiced law.

Williams was a Democrat. In 1891, he was elected prosecuting attorney of Franklin County. He ran for a second term in 1893, but lost. He was elected as judge of the common pleas court in 1897, and served one term until 1903 before retiring to practice law again. He practiced law at the Ruggery Building in Columbus.

Williams served as a member of the Ohio Senate. He worked as city safety director in Columbus. He served as president of the Federal Union Life Insurance Company in Cincinnati from 1934 to 1935.

== Personal life ==
Williams married Margaret Owen of Columbus on July 5, 1893. They had three daughters and two sons, Elmira Anne, Margaret Iola, Marie Owen, Curtis C. Jr. and Arthur Frost. His son Curtis C. Jr. was professor of law at the University of West Virginia.

Williams died of a heart ailment on April 2, 1942, in Columbus.
