= Silas A. Conrad =

American politician (1840–1913)

19th Lieutenant Governor of Ohio
- In office 1887–1888

Member of the Ohio Senate from the 21st district
- In office 1886–1888
- Preceded by: John V. Lewis
- Succeeded by: Thomas C. Snyder

Member of the Ohio House of Representatives from the Stark County district
- In office 1880–1884 Serving with Thomas C. Snyder
- Preceded by: Daniel Worley and Richard G. Williams
- Succeeded by: Leander C. Cole and John McBride

Personal details
- Born: June 7, 1840 Ohio, U.S.
- Died: September 11, 1913 (aged 73) Massillon, Ohio, U.S.
- Resting place: Massillon City Cemetery
- Party: Republican

Silas A. Conrad (June 7, 1840 – September 11, 1913) was an American politician who served as the 19th lieutenant governor of Ohio from 1887 to 1888 under Governor Joseph B. Foraker.

== Biography ==
Silas A. Conrad was born on June 7, 1840.

Conrad served as a member of the Ohio House of Representatives, representing Stark County from 1880 to 1884. He served as a member of the Ohio Senate, representing the 21st district from 1886 to 1888. He served as president pro tempore of the Ohio Senate, succeeding John O'Neill in the 1886 to 1888 term. Conrad served as the 19th lieutenant governor of Ohio from 1887 to 1888 under Governor Joseph B. Foraker.

He died in Massillon, Ohio on September 11, 1913.

Political offices
| Preceded by Robert P. Kennedy | Lieutenant Governor of Ohio; 1887–1888 | Succeeded by William C. Lyon |
