= Richard G. Williams =

American politician (1830–1906)

Member of the Ohio House of Representatives from the Stark County district
- In office 1876–1880 Serving with Johnson Sherrick and Daniel Worley
- Preceded by: Edward Brook and Johnson Sherrick
- Succeeded by: Thomas C. Snyder and Silas A. Conrad

Personal details
- Born: Richard Gilson Williams; 1830 Salineville, Ohio, U.S.
- Died: November 9, 1906 (aged 75–76)
- Party: Democratic
- Spouse: Elmira Frost (m. 1860)
- Children: 4, including Curtis C.
- Parent: Joseph F. Williams (father)
- Education: Washington College
- Occupation: Politician; physician; businessman

Richard Gilson Williams (1830 – November 9, 1906) was an American politician from Ohio. He served as a member of the Ohio House of Representatives, representing Stark County from 1876 to 1880.

== Early life ==
Richard Gilson Williams was born in Salineville, Ohio, in 1830 to Mary (née Gilson) and Joseph F. Williams. His father was a member of the Ohio House of Representatives and the Ohio Senate. He attended local schools and Washington College in Washington, Pennsylvania.

== Career ==
In 1864, Williams opened a drug store in Alliance. He worked there until his death. He also worked as a physician.

Williams was a Democrat. He served as a member of the Ohio House of Representatives, representing Stark County from 1876 to 1880. He helped with the re-codification of laws in Ohio in the late 1870s and early 1880s.

== Personal life ==
Williams married Elmira Frost in 1860. They had four children, Curtis Chandler, Orva G., M. Iola and Norma. His son Curtis was a prosecuting attorney and common pleas judge in Franklin County. He was a member of the Presbyterian Church.

Williams died on November 9, 1906.
