= Johnson Sherrick =

American politician and businessman (1841–1914)

Member of the Ohio Senate from the 21st district
- In office 1878–1880
- Preceded by: Albert R. Haines
- Succeeded by: Edwin Norman Hartshorn

Member of the Ohio House of Representatives from the Stark County district
- In office 1874–1878 Serving with Edward Brook and Richard G. Williams
- Preceded by: Samuel C. Bowman and Ellis N. Johnson Jr.
- Succeeded by: Daniel Worley

Personal details
- Born: August 28, 1841 near Canton, Ohio, U.S.
- Died: August 1914 (aged 72–73)
- Party: Democratic
- Spouse: Charlotte Miller (m. 1875)
- Occupation: Politician; businessman; bank president

Johnson Sherrick (August 28, 1841 – August 1914) was an American politician and businessman from Ohio. He served as a member of the Ohio House of Representatives, representing Stark County from 1874 to 1878 and served as a member of the Ohio Senate from 1878 to 1880. He was engaged in the hardware store business in Canton and formed the Canton Hardware Company in 1887.

== Early life ==
Johnson Sherrick was born on August 28, 1841, on a farm near Canton, Ohio, to Mary (née Danforth) and Christian Sherrick. His father did packet canal boating from Dayton to Cincinnati and then moved to a farm in Canton. Sherrick was educated in common schools and attended Canton High School. He taught school during several winters.

== Career ==
In 1863, Sherrick worked in business in St. Louis, Missouri. He then enlisted in the U.S. Navy, but was discharged for disability due to illness. In 1865, Sherrick returned to Stark County and taught school. From 1866 to 1867, Sherrick worked at the C. C. Snyder hardware store in Canton, Miller & Byers hardware store in Wooster, and the Whitney & Gaines hardware store in Loudonville. In 1870, he worked with Louis Miller in a Canton hardware store called Sherrick & Miller. He sold his interest in the store in 1874 to his father-in-law D. D. Miller. Around 1882, Sherrick bought the hardware store back from his father-in-law and operated it under his own name until 1887. In 1887, he formed the Canton Hardware Company. He worked as president and treasurer of the company until his retirement in January 1903.

Sherrick was a Democrat. Sherrick served as a member of the Ohio House of Representatives, representing Stark County from 1874 to 1878. He then served as a member of the Ohio Senate from 1878 to 1880. He was chairman of the Democratic Central Committee of Stark County and was a delegate to Democratic state conventions. He was president of the Canton Board of Education and served on the city council of Canton.

Sherrick was vice president of the City National Bank in Canton for several years. In 1890, he became president of the First National Bank until he resigned. He founded the Nye Manufacturing Company and was president of that company. He also founded the Canton Pottery Company. He was the director of the Board of Trade in Canton.

== Personal life ==
Sherrick married Charlotte Miller of Wooster on October 14, 1875. Sherrick and his wife traveled extensively. They took trips to Bermuda, western Europe, Mexico, Egypt and northern Africa, and parts of the Middle East.

Sherrick died in August 1914.
