= Samuel C. Bowman =

American politician (1822–1898)

Mayor of Massillon, Ohio
- In office 1884–1886
- Preceded by: Leander C. Cole

Member of the Ohio House of Representatives from the Stark County district
- In office 1870–1874 Serving with Ellis N. Johnson Jr.
- Preceded by: Joseph Dilworth and Joseph Thompson
- Succeeded by: Edward Brook and Johnson Sherrick

Personal details
- Born: September 5, 1822 near Chambersburg, Pennsylvania, U.S.
- Died: September 20, 1898 (aged 76) Massillon, Ohio, U.S.
- Party: Republican
- Spouse: Elizabeth Sour (m. 1849, died)
- Children: 1
- Occupation: Politician; educator; businessman

Samuel C. Bowman (September 5, 1822 – September 20, 1898) was an American politician from Ohio. He served as a member of the Ohio House of Representatives, representing Stark County from 1870 to 1874. He was mayor of Massillon from 1884 to 1886.

== Early life ==
Samuel C. Bowman was born on September 5, 1822, near Chambersburg, Franklin County, Pennsylvania, to Christina (née Krider) and Abraham Bowman Jr. At the age of seven, Bowman moved with his family to Stark County, Ohio, near Brookfield. He assisted his family on the farm and was educated at Edenburg Academy, Haysville Academy, and at a school in Massillon.

== Career ==
At the age of 21, Bowman started teaching school in his township. He continued this for about 10 years. In 1852. Bowman moved to Massillon and worked as a clerk. He then went into partnership with I. N. Doxsee in a tin business on Erie Street. He continued this endeavor for four years. Bowman formed a milling business with Taylor called Taylor & Bowman. He then worked in the hardware business. In May 1864, Bowman enlisted with the 162nd Ohio National Guard as second lieutenant of Company A. He served mostly in Columbus, Ohio, and left service in September 1864. After returning to Stark County, he resumed his dealings in milling and hardware. He left the hardware business in 1880.

Bowman was a Republican. Bowman served as a member of the Ohio House of Representatives, representing Stark County from 1870 to 1874. His last two years, Bowman was chairman of the committee on geology, mines, and mining. In 1876, Bowman was elected as councilman of the Third Ward. He served in that role for four years. He was elected as president of the city council of Massillon in 1879.

In 1880, Bowman was elected to the state board of equalization. From 1884 to 1886, he served as mayor of Massillon. He also served as justice of the peace in 1892 and was a trustee of the township for 10 years.

Bowman was trustee of the Fairmount Children's Home in Alliance. In 1855, he joined the Masons.

== Personal life ==
Bowman married Elizabeth Sour of Franklin Township, Summit County, Ohio, on January 4, 1849. His wife predeceased him. They had one daughter, Ida.

Bowman died on September 20, 1898, aged 76, at his home at 64 North Mill Street in Massillon.
