= Salineville, Ohio =

- Village
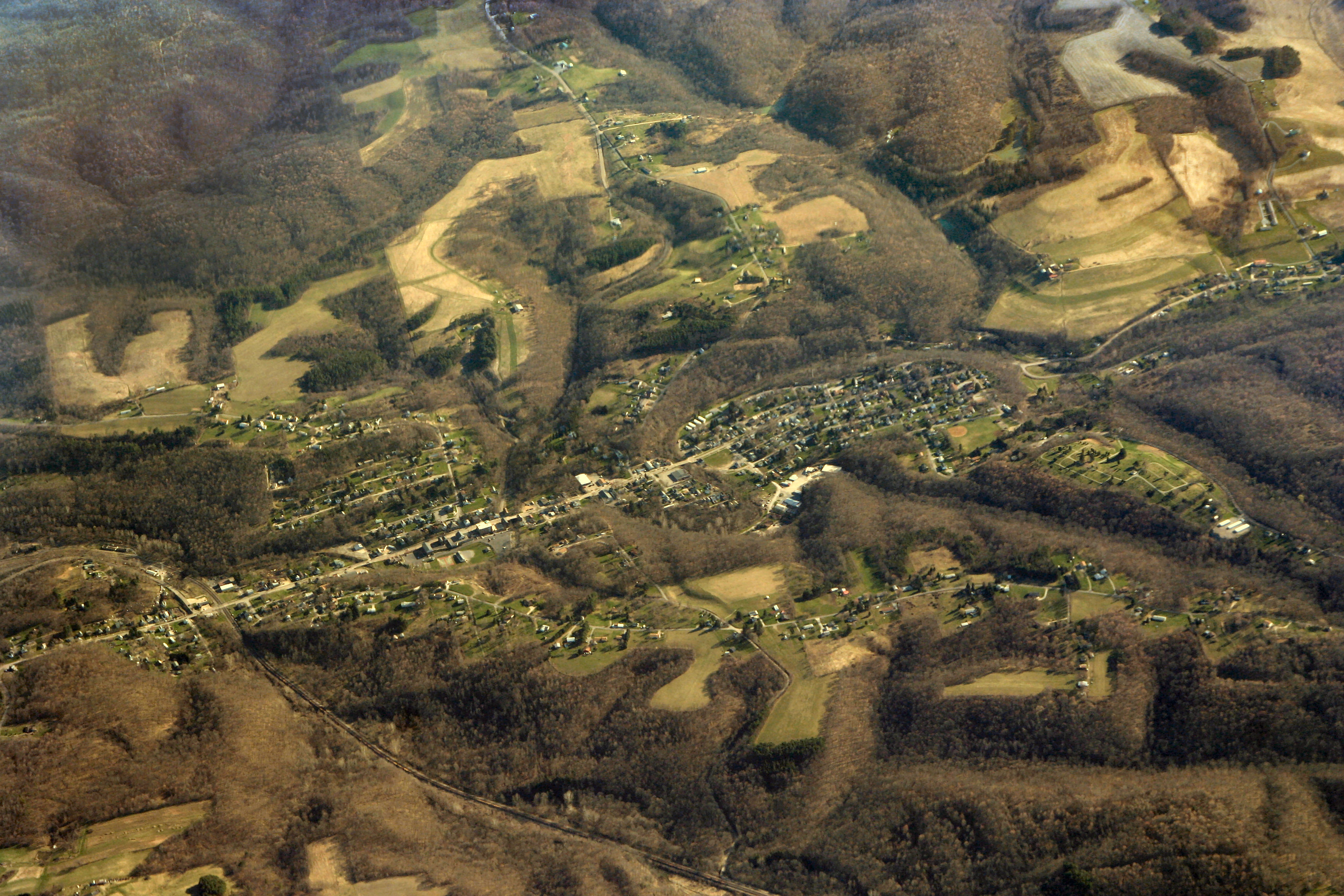
- Salineville from the air, looking south
- Motto: Salt of the Earth
- Interactive map of Salineville, Ohio
- Location within Ohio Location within the United States
- Coordinates: 40°37′26″N 80°50′08″W
- Country: United States
- State: Ohio
- County: Columbiana
- Founded: 1839
- Named for: Yellow Creek salinity

Government
  - Type: Mayor-Council
  - Mayor: Chad J. Bettis

Area
  - Total: 2.21 sq mi (5.72 km^{2})
  - Land: 2.21 sq mi (5.72 km^{2})
  - Water: 0 sq mi (0.00 km^{2})
- Elevation: 938 ft (286 m)

Population (2020)
  - Total: 1,206
  - Density: 545.9/sq mi (210.77/km^{2})
- Time zone: UTC-5 (Eastern (EST))
  - Summer (DST): UTC-4 (EDT)
- ZIP code: 43945
- Area codes: 330, 234
- FIPS code: 39-70100
- GNIS feature ID: 2399176
- School District: Southern Local School District
- Website: https://www.salinevilleoh.gov/

Salineville (/səˈliːnvɪl/ sə-LEEN-vil ) is a village in Columbiana County, Ohio, United States. The population was 1,206 at the 2020 census.

== History ==
Salineville was laid out in 1839 and incorporated as a village in 1848. Salineville was named from the salt deposits, or salinity, found on Yellow Creek. During the American Civil War, the Battle of Salineville took place near the village in 1863 and resulted in the capture of Confederate general John Hunt Morgan, ending Morgan's Raid from Tennessee into Ohio. It was the northernmost military action involving an official command of the Confederate States Army.

== Geography ==
According to the United States Census Bureau, the village has a total area of 2.21 square miles (5.72 km^{2}), all land. It is approximately 20 miles (32 km) northwest of Steubenville and 35 miles (56 km) southwest of Youngstown.

== Demographics ==
Historical population
Census	Pop.	Note	%±
1860	485		—
1870	1,429		194.6%
1880	2,302		61.1%
1890	2,369		2.9%
1900	2,353		−0.7%
1910	2,403		2.1%
1920	2,700		12.4%
1930	2,133		−21.0%
1940	2,018		−5.4%
1950	2,018		0.0%
1960	1,898		−5.9%
1970	1,686		−11.2%
1980	1,629		−3.4%
1990	1,474		−9.5%
2000	1,397		−5.2%
2010	1,311		−6.2%
2020	1,206		−8.0%
U.S. Decennial Census

=== 2010 census ===
As of the census of 2010, there were 1,311 people, 518 households, and 346 families living in the village. The population density was 593.2 inhabitants per square mile (229.0/km^{2}). There were 591 housing units at an average density of 267.4 per square mile (103.2/km^{2}). The racial makeup of the village was 97.1% White, 1.4% African American, 0.2% Native American, 0.1% Asian, and 1.3% from two or more races. Hispanic or Latino of any race were 0.4% of the population.

There were 518 households, of which 36.1% had children under the age of 18 living with them, 42.7% were married couples living together, 15.8% had a female householder with no husband present, 8.3% had a male householder with no wife present, and 33.2% were non-families. 28.2% of all households were made up of individuals, and 11.8% had someone living alone who was 65 years of age or older. The average household size was 2.52 and the average family size was 3.02.

The median age in the village was 36.5 years. 27.8% of residents were under the age of 18; 7.9% were between the ages of 18 and 24; 24% were from 25 to 44; 26.4% were from 45 to 64; and 14% were 65 years of age or older. The gender makeup of the village was 47.8% male and 52.2% female.

=== 2000 census ===
As of the census of 2000, there were 1,397 people, 535 households, and 365 families living in the village. The population density was 628.6 inhabitants per square mile (242.7/km^{2}). There were 594 housing units at an average density of 267.3 per square mile (103.2/km^{2}). The racial makeup of the village was 99.07% White, 0.36% Native American, 0.07% from other races, and 0.50% from two or more races. Hispanic or Latino of any race were 0.57% of the population.

There were 535 households, out of which 33.3% had children under the age of 18 living with them, 47.9% were married couples living together, 14.6% had a female householder with no husband present, and 31.6% were non-families. 26.7% of all households were made up of individuals, and 13.8% had someone living alone who was 65 years of age or older. The average household size was 2.60 and the average family size was 3.14.

In the village, the population was spread out, with 29.2% under the age of 18, 9.3% from 18 to 24, 27.6% from 25 to 44, 22.2% from 45 to 64, and 11.7% who were 65 years of age or older. The median age was 33 years. For every 100 females there were 97.9 males. For every 100 females age 18 and over, there were 90.9 males.

The median income for a household in the village was $27,473, and the median income for a family was $30,167. Males had a median income of $28,864 versus $19,539 for females. The per capita income for the village was $13,895. About 11.6% of families and 15.7% of the population were below the poverty line, including 22.4% of those under age 18 and 16.5% of those age 65 or over.

== Parks and recreation ==
Yellow Creek State Forest is located near and borders Salineville.

== Government ==
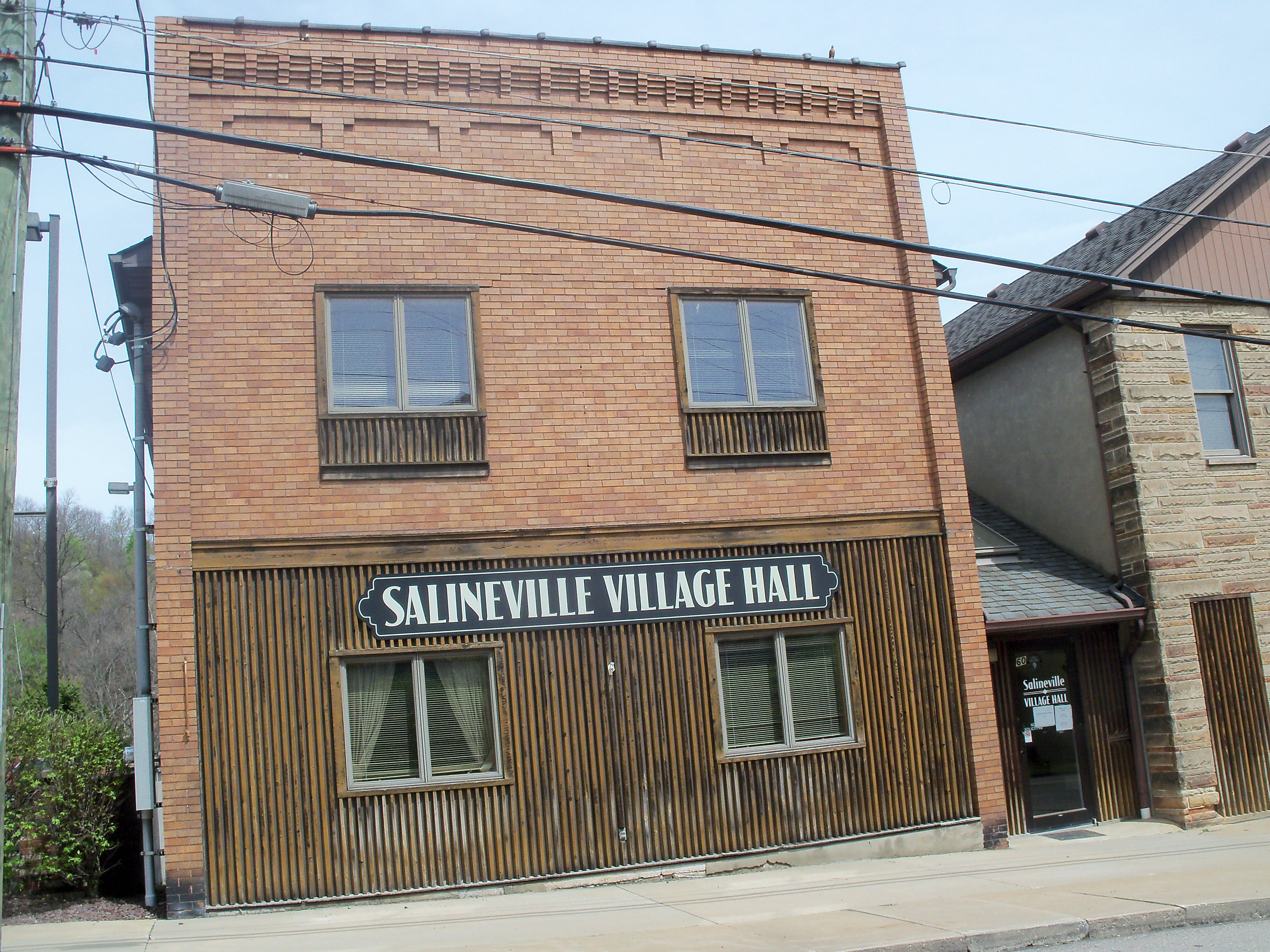
Salineville village hall

Salineville operates under a mayor–council government, where there are six council members elected as a legislature in addition to an independently elected mayor who serves as an executive. As of 2024, the mayor is Chad J. Bettis. Additionally, Salineville has a Board of Trustees of Public Affairs, a three-member board elected separately from the village council.

== Education ==
Children in Salineville are served by the public Southern Local School District, which operates a K-12 complex that includes one elementary school and Southern Local Junior/Senior High School. The renovated complex was built by adding to what was then the Southern Local High School building and was completed in 2004. Additionally, Utica Shale Academy focuses on vocational education for the production of natural gas in the Utica Shale.

== Notable people ==
- Ben Feldman, record-setting life insurance salesman
- Julia H. Johnston, Christian songwriter who composed Grace Greater Than All Our Sin
- Joseph F. Williams, member of the Ohio General Assembly
- Richard G. Williams, member of the Ohio House of Representatives

== See also ==
- John H. Morgan Surrender Site
