= Joseph F. Williams =

American politician (1809–1882)

Member of the Ohio Senate from the 22nd district
- In office 1854–1856
- Preceded by: James McKinney
- Succeeded by: J. D. Cattell

Member of the Ohio House of Representatives from the Columbiana County district
- In office 1847–1848 Serving with James Patton
- Preceded by: Clement Vallandigham
- Succeeded by: David King
- In office 1845–1846 Serving with Clement Vallandigham
- Preceded by: Robert Filson
- Succeeded by: Clement Vallandigham

Personal details
- Born: August 15, 1809 Chester County, Pennsylvania, U.S.
- Died: December 11, 1882 (aged 73) Salineville, Ohio, U.S.
- Party: Democratic
- Spouse(s): Mary Gilson; Miss Northdrift
- Children: Richard G.
- Relatives: Curtis C. Williams (grandson)
- Occupation: Politician; blacksmith

Joseph F. Williams (August 15, 1809 – December 11, 1882) was an American politician from Ohio. He served as a member of the Ohio House of Representatives, representing Columbiana County from 1845 to 1846 and from 1847 to 1848. He served as a member of the Ohio Senate from 1854 to 1856.

== Early life ==
Joseph F. Williams was born on August 15, 1809, in Chester County, Pennsylvania, to Edward Williams. His father was of Scottish-Irish ancestry.

== Career ==
Williams worked as a blacksmith in Columbiana County, Ohio, and built mechanical devices for mills and factories.

Williams was a Democrat. He served as a member of the Ohio House of Representatives, representing Columbiana County from 1845 to 1846 and from 1847 to 1848. He served as a member of the Ohio Senate, representing the 22nd district from 1854 to 1856. He was justice of the peace of Salineville.

Later in life, Williams was an oil prospector in Ohio and Pennsylvania.

== Personal life ==
Williams married Mary Gilson. Their son Richard G. Williams served in the Ohio House of Representatives. He lived on a farm in Salineville. His grandson Curtis C. was a prosecuting attorney and judge of common pleas in Franklin County, Ohio. He also married Miss Northdrift who predeceased him. He was a member of the Presbyterian Church of Salineville. He was chosen as an elder of the search at its founding in 1864.

Williams died following a fall on December 11, 1882, at his home in Salineville.
