= John B. Rae =

American labor leader (1838–1922)

1st President of the United Mine Workers
- In office 1890–1892
- Preceded by: Created
- Succeeded by: John McBride

Personal details
- Born: June 4, 1838 Wayne County, Ohio, U.S.
- Died: May 24, 1922 (aged 83) Bowling Green, Wood County, Ohio
- Occupation: Miner; Labor leader; Physician
- Known for: President, United Mine Workers of America

John B. Rae (June 4, 1838 – May 24, 1922) was an American labor leader. He served as the president of the Knights of Labor Assembly 135, a coal miners' union. He and John McBride co-founded the United Mine Workers of America in 1890, and Rae served as the labor union's first president. Rae led national coal miners' strikes in 1890 and 1891, both of which the union lost. He chose not to run for re-election, and McBride won election as his successor.

On May 8, 1873, in Port of New York City, John B Rae, age 34, occupation miner, born in Scotland, arrived with his wife Ellen and four children on the SS Algeria which had departed Liverpool. In 1880, he was a shoemaker serving the mining community, living with his wife Ellen and six children, two more children were born in Pennsylvania in Westmoreland County, Pennsylvania. He had been a miner since boyhood, and an admirer of the trades union principle before he emigrated to America. He was a preacher, when the Knights of Labor began to organize, he rose quickly, and soon became prominent in the labor circles. By 1900, he moved to Bowling Green Ohio. There he lived with his wife Helen, and 15-year-old daughter Margaret. He listed his occupation as a physician. His wife Helen was listed as the mother of ten children, nine still living. In September 1906, his wife Helen/Ellen died, John B remarried to Mary C. and as of 1920 still resided in Bowling Green, working as a Janitor. John B Rae died on May 24, 1922, at 114 Liberty Street, Bowling Green, Ohio and was buried in the Oak Grove Cemetery.

Preceded by founding president	President, United Mine Workers of America; 1890–1892	Succeeded by John McBride
