= John McBride (labor leader) =

American labor union leader (1854–1917)

- Sketch of McBride in 1894 publication

2nd President of the American Federation of Labor
- In office January 1, 1895 – December 16, 1895
- Preceded by: Samuel Gompers
- Succeeded by: Samuel Gompers

2nd President of the United Mine Workers
- In office 1892–1895
- Preceded by: John B. Rae
- Succeeded by: Phil Penna

Member of the Ohio House of Representatives from the Stark County district
- In office 1884–1888 Serving with Leander C. Cole
- Preceded by: Silas A. Conrad and Thomas C. Snyder
- Succeeded by: John E. Monnot and George W. Wilhelm

Personal details
- Born: June 25, 1854 Chippewa Township, Ohio, U.S.
- Died: October 9, 1917 (aged 63) Globe, Arizona, U.S.
- Resting place: Columbus, Ohio, U.S.
- Spouse: Mary Kelly (m. 1874)
- Children: 4
- Occupation: Miner; labor leader
- Known for: President, United Mine Workers of America

John McBride (June 25, 1854 – October 9, 1917) was an American labor union leader. He served as a member of the Ohio House of Representatives, representing Stark County from 1884 to 1888. He was the second president of the American Federation of Labor, serving from 1894 to 1895.

== Early life ==
John McBride was born on June 25, 1854, in Chippewa Township, Ohio, to Bridge (née McMackin) and Thomas McBride. His father emigrated from England and worked as a mining supervisor in Massillon. McBride started working in the coal mines at the age of about eight or nine. He first worked as a water carrier before becoming a miner at the age of 12.

== Career ==
In 1870 or 1872, McBride joined the Ohio Miners' Union. He became secretary of Lodge No. 15, M. L. B. A. In 1877, McBride became district president of the Tuscarawas Valley Miners' Association. He also served as president of the Miners' Protective Association of Ohio. In 1879, McBride stopped working in mines and became a check weighman at the Groves Coal Company. In April 1882, he was elected president of the Ohio Miners' Union, a post that he retained until 1889. He served as president during the Coal miners' strike of 1873. In December 1888, he became president of the National Progressive Miners' Union and served in that role until February 1890.

McBride was a Democrat. He served as a member of the Ohio House of Representatives, representing Stark County from 1884 to 1888. In 1886, he was nominated for Ohio Secretary of State, but lost to James S. Robinson. In 1887, he ran for the Ohio Senate, but lost. On April 1, 1890, McBride was appointed commissioner to the Bureau of Labor Statistics by Governor James E. Campbell. He served in that role until February 22, 1892. He helped found the Ohio People’s Party in 1891. In 1892, McBride was elected president of the United Mine Workers.

McBride's prominence continued to rise with the growth of the Populist Movement in the American Midwest, and in 1894, McBride unseated labor icon Samuel Gompers as president of the American Federation of Labor. He held that role from January 1, 1895, to December 1895. Not long after assuming the office, however, McBride became embroiled in conflicts with other union leaders and his popularity declined. Gompers regained the presidency the following year.

Starting in 1890, McBride was editor of the Miner's Independent, publication of the miners' union based in Massillon.

In the spring of 1917, U.S. Secretary of Labor William Bauchop Wilson appointed McBride conciliator in labor disputes in Jerome, Arizona. He also acted as conciliator in Utah and Globe, Arizona. He was appointed police magistrate in Phoenix, Arizona, and was a member of the tobacco manufacturing firm McBride and Beaver. He served as president of the Arizona State Federation of Labor.

== Personal life ==
McBride married Mary Kelly, daughter of William Kelly, of Knox County, Ohio, on August 11, 1874. They had four children, Lida L., Kittie B., Edward J. and Joseph F. The family lived on Summit Street. He moved to Phoenix, in 1911 due to his health. They lived at 1418 West Washington Street in Phoenix.

McBride died on October 9, 1917, at a hospital in Globe. He was standing on a street corner in Globe, when a runaway horse knocked him through a plate glass window, causing severe lacerations in his leg, a severed artery, great loss of blood, and death. He was buried in Columbus, Ohio.

Trade union offices
Preceded by John B. Rae	President of the United Mine Workers of America; 1892 - 1895	Succeeded by Phil Penna
Preceded by Samuel Gompers	President of the American Federation of Labor; 1894–1895	Succeeded by Samuel Gompers
