= Berkeley Berry Birch =

Berkeley Berry Birch plc (BBB) is a company, formerly listed on the London Stock Exchange, which collapsed in 2006 and which is now in Administration.

== Reverse takeover ==
The firm was originally called Berry Birch & Noble, an old insurance broking firm that had got into trading difficulties, but changed name to Berkeley Berry Birch plc following a reverse takeover in 2002 by Clifford Lockyer's Berkeley Group, a privately held firm of independent financial advisers (IFAs) in Coventry. Lockyer wished to float his firm on the stock market and the reverse takeover of the ailing Berry Birch & Noble enabled him to do so more easily and cheaply than through a traditional flotation.

== Subsidiaries ==
The firm had a number of subsidiaries, including:

- Berkeley Independent Advisers Ltd.
- Berkeley Berry Birch Group Support Services Limited
- Berry Birch & Noble Financial Planning Limited
- Berry Birch & Noble Financial Planning (Weston) Limited
- Berry Birch & Noble Insurance Brokers Ltd.
- Berry Birch & Noble Trustees Ltd.
- MacRobins plc

== Trading problems ==
Problems emerged soon after the float, however, including poor trading and a Financial Services Authority investigation into business practices at the IFA subsidiary Berkeley Independent Advisers, problems within former Berry Birch & Noble firms and a general lack of capital which caused FSA regulations to be breached.

Plans to expand the group through acquisitions funded by the issue of additional shares faltered as the share price fell. Attempts to recapitalise the company through restructuring and injections of capital from shareholders and insurance company investors failed.

== Administration ==
By 2005 the company's shares were suspended and the firm went into Administration in 2006.

== See also ==
- Clifford Lockyer
- Clive Holmes
