= Leander C. Cole =

American politician and lawyer (1849–1933)

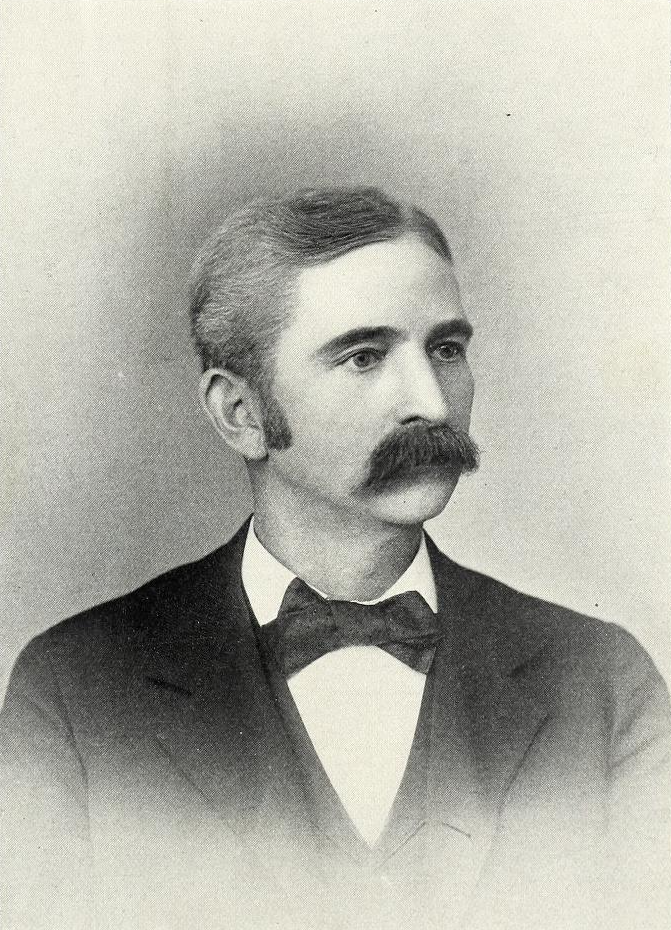
- Cole in a 1897 publication

Member of the Ohio House of Representatives from the Stark County district
- In office 1884–1888 Serving with John McBride
- Preceded by: Silas A. Conrad and Thomas C. Snyder
- Succeeded by: John E. Monnot and George W. Wilhelm

Mayor of Massillon, Ohio
- In office 1880–1884
- Succeeded by: Samuel C. Bowman

Personal details
- Born: September 14, 1849 Island Creek Township, Jefferson County, Ohio, U.S.
- Died: August 18, 1933 (aged 83) Lakewood, Ohio, U.S.
- Resting place: Oak Grove Cemetery
- Party: Democratic
- Spouse: Martha J. Douglass
- Children: 2
- Education: Mount Union College
- Occupation: Politician; lawyer; businessman
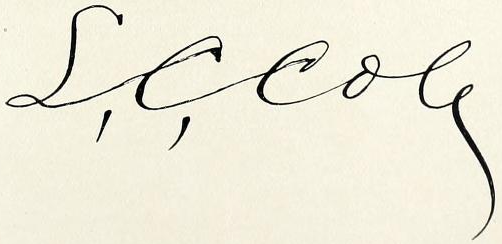
- Signature

Leander C. Cole (September 14, 1849 – August 18, 1933) was an American politician and lawyer from Ohio. He was a member of the Ohio House of Representatives, representing Stark County from 1884 to 1888.

== Early life ==
Leander C. Cole was born on September 14, 1849, in Island Creek Township, Jefferson County, Ohio, to Mary (née Jackman) (1814–1882) and Thomas Cole (1808–1859). He was raised as a farmer. As a boy, he led Union forces to capture Confederate raider John Hunt Morgan near West Beaver Township, Pennsylvania, during the Civil War. He attended school for several years, took a four-year course at Mount Union College and Richmond. In 1871, he started to study law with Judge Robert Martin in Steubenville and was admitted to the bar in 1872.

== Career ==
He first started practicing law in Massillon. From June 1873 to April 1887, he remained in Massillon. He practiced law with Isaac Ulman until 1879. He then practice law alone until March 1881, when he partnered with R. W. McCaughey.

Cole was a Democrat. He served as city solicitor in Massillon from 1875 to 1880. In 1880, Cole was elected mayor of Massillon. He served two terms, until 1884. He served as a member of the Ohio House of Representatives, representing Stark County from 1884 to 1888. He was nominated as Speaker of the House, but lost the election. He was a member of the Democratic State Central Committee for six years and was a member of the executive committee for four years. He also served as secretary of the executive committee.

In 1887, he moved to Bowling Green. He became engaged with the Bowling Green Glass Company. There was a fire in 1891, and the company ceased. Cole became president of Swayzee Glass Company in Swayzee, Indiana. He was director of First National Bank in Bowling Green and was a member of oil companies in Wood County and Tennessee.

In 1894, Cole ran for probate judge of Wood County, but lost the election. He was a member of the board of trustees of the Toledo State Hospital from 1897 to 1907. In 1901, he was chairman of the cereal company A. B. Barnum Company based in Battle Creek, Michigan.

== Personal life ==
Cole married Martha J. Douglass, daughter of Thompson Douglass, in 1872 or 1873. They had two children, Thomas D. and Nellie S (died 1895). He was a member of the Methodist Episcopal Church.

Cole died on August 18, 1933, in Lakewood. He was buried in Oak Grove Cemetery.
