= Ben Feldman (insurance salesman) =

American businessman

- Born: September 7, 1912; New York City, New York, U.S.
- Died: November 7, 1993 (aged 81); Pittsburgh, Pennsylvania, U.S.
- Occupation: Businessman

Ben Feldman (September 7, 1912 – November 7, 1993) was an American businessman and one of the most prolific salespeople in history. As early as 1979, Feldman had sold more life insurance than anyone in history.

Feldman was born on September 7, 1912, in New York City. He was one of nine children to Isaac and Bertha Dardick Feldman, who were Russian Jewish immigrants. He began in sales when the family moved to Salineville, Ohio to open a wholesale poultry business.

Feldman spent most of his adult life living in East Liverpool, Ohio, which is where he began his career in life insurance sales. He sold life insurance policies with a total face value of about $1.5-billion for New York Life from 1942 to his death in 1993. He once held the world record for the most products sold (by value) by a salesman in a career, a year ($100,000,000), and in a single day ($20,000,000). Near the end of his career, his annual commission totals were over $1,000,000 per year. At the time, these sales totals were equaled only by the entire sales forces of other insurance companies, though they have long since been nominally surpassed. When asked how he could sell such an intangible product as life insurance, Feldman responded, "I do not sell life insurance. I sell money. I sell dollars for pennies apiece. My dollars cost 3 cents per dollar per year."

Feldman died on November 7, 1993, at West Penn Hospital in Pittsburgh, Pennsylvania. He was the subject of four books: The Feldman Method, The Incomparable Salesman, The Supersalesman, and The Supersalesman and Creative Selling.
