= American Miners' Association =

The American Miners' Association was the first national union of miners in the United States. Formed in 1861 at a convention in St. Louis, Missouri, by English delegates from the bituminous fields of Illinois and Missouri, its short lived success and growth were primarily results of the Civil War. Through the leadership of Thomas Lloyd, first president of the organization, and Daniel Weaver, first secretary who wrote the Address that called for the organization and the constitution, the national union was able to spread itself into other mining districts in the United States.

The American Miners' Association published a periodical called the Weekly Miner.

The American Miners' Association began to fail due to disastrous strikes and internal dissensions during the period 1867–1868, and ceased to exist by 1869.

== British Influence ==
=== First appearances of unions in the United States ===
Unions first garnered public attention in 1845 when British emigrant reformers flooded the American workforce and zealously spread the gospel of unionism. Since then, American corporate employers used newsletters to tarnish the reputation of unions and depicted them as "foreign importations." As a result, union activists and members were unfavorably judged as individuals who were against the spirit of American institutions. However, it was the labor leaders who were oftentimes targeted and publicly denounced as "blatherskites" and "demagogues" who were "too lazy to work and unwilling to allow self-respecting men to work."

=== The Chartist movement ===
The organizers who participated in the creation of the American Miners’ Association were working men of Great Britain who fled England in 1848 after the failed Chartist movement. Between 1838 and 1848, England faced a season of great depressions and was under the stimulus of the French Revolution. With all these events taking place, the working-class movement in England became excited to the point of rebellion and sought political reform. On April 10, 1848, Chartists leaders delivered a petition to Parliament asserting the rights of ordinary people. The petition contained an exaggeration of six million signatures to enact the "Six-Point Political Principles" of the Chartists in the National Constitution. Originally taken from the American Constitutional System, these points included annual parliaments, universal suffrage, vote by ballot, abolition of property qualifications for membership in the House of Commons, payment of members, and equal electoral districts. Fearful of a rebellion, Queen Victoria dispatched thousands of soldiers and special constables who successfully suppressed the rebellion.

=== British mine workers, Thomas Lloyd and Daniel Weaver ===
Through the Chartist movement, British emigrants were taught the proper methods needed to obtain power through intelligent organization. Accustomed to better labor conditions in England, many Chartist and lieutenants of the well-formed Miners’ National Association of Great Britain arrived in United States and began to spread the gospel of unionism and labor rights among the American miners. Many of these labor rights that they were accustomed to included; shorter work days, increased safety, better ventilation in mines, educational advantages for union members, higher wages and protection for union workers for the future state.

The most influential members who participated in the creation of the American Miners’ Association were Thomas Lloyd and Daniel Weaver. Thomas Lloyd, first president of the association, was a Welshman and Chartist veteran who settled on the Belleville Tract. As an energetic worker and forcible speaker, Lloyd was able to attract mass crowds and was the chief supporter of Weaver in getting the organization started. Equally influential was Daniel Weaver, an English Chartist veteran who was raised in the mines and was self-educated. He was the author of the address, which was the call for a national convention, and the constitution for the American Miners’ Association.

== An attempt to organize miners' prior to the American Miners' Association ==
Prior to the organization of the American Miners’ Association, there was no need for an organization at a national level. However, organization at a local level was easily accomplished for two reasons. The first being that trade was easily controlled through organization without assistance from other districts. Secondly, each district had its own market and therefore created no competition. Although easily accomplished, these unions only lasted a short period of time due to public scrutiny and internal difficulties.

The need for local organization was a result of several factors. First, because the only means of transportation for coal during this period was river transportation, mining was a seasonal occupation. Coal mining was generally done by experienced hands in the spring and fall, and was transported in the summer. During the winter season, however, the only work for miners was domestic coal. In order to cut wages, employers employed inexperienced and unskilled farm hands in the mines. This resulted in competition within the mining workforce because farm hands were paid less, which resulted in starvation of miners.

Another reason for the failure of local unions was due to a policy that required corporations to eliminate labor leaders from their ranks. They did this by offering incentives to labor leaders. These included higher wages and promotions to superintendents. This method was successful in several localities and played a prominent role in the dismantling of local unions.

The final reason for the failure of local unions was still relevant during the organization of the national union. Public scrutiny made it almost impossible for miners to take a step forward in industrial advancement because they were always faced with adverse public opinion that was generated by the corporate employers that employed them. This section will be further explained in the "Fall of the Organization" section of this wiki.

== Formation of the American Miners' Association ==
The formation of the American Miners’ Association was largely the work of British miners who were accustomed to better work conditions and labor rights than their American counterpart. When Daniel Weaver and Thomas Lloyd, two Chartist veterans, immigrated into the United States, they quickly attempted to build a national organization in Belleville Tract, Illinois. These former Chartist's discussed the benefits that were to be derived from the organization and urged representatives of miners from Illinois and Missouri to join in the formation. The initial success of this national union was largely due to Daniel Weaver's To the Miners of the United States, in which he laid out several arguments in favor of unionism and provided a date and location for the January 1861 Convention. It was during this convention that Daniel Weaver showcased his constitution for the union, which was adopted and printed, and maintained the rules and laws of the organization, as well as the duties of the executive officers to protect the miners from their employers.

=== To the Miners of the United States ===
To the Miners of the United States was a call for representatives, mainly from Illinois and Missouri, to meet at a convention in St. Louis, Missouri, on January 28, 1861, with the goal to organize a national union. Daniel Weaver made several arguments in favor for a union, but most of them had one common theme, which was that unity was essential for the attainment of rights and to improve and alleviate their current condition. By using the union as a “fundamental principle,” the address argued that men could do more together united, than alone. This was well displayed in the preface of the constitution, which will be provided in the following section. Along with labor rights and legislative protection for their safety, interest, and well-being of their families, the address also provided a section that urged individuals of the important to mutually instruct and improve their own knowledge. By arguing that knowledge is power, the address argued the importance for individuals to study the law of life, relations of capital to labor, politics, municipal affairs, literature, science, and other subject relating to the general warfare of their craft. This was perhaps a mechanism to alleviate the public scrutiny that labeled them as ill-mannered individuals, and as a result, achieve support from the public.

=== Constitution ===
The preface of the constitution included a poem that demonstrated helplessness and the sentiments that ran through the mineworkers and demonstrated how a strong organization would support them.

"Step by step, the longest march Can be won, can be won; Single stones will form an arch, One by one, one by one, Andy by union, what we will Can be all accomplished still. Drops of water turn a mill-- Singly none, singly none."

In the preamble of the constitution, Daniel Weaver aggressively lays out the problems that miners faced on a daily basis. These included dangers from explosions and insecure roofs, firedamp's and noxious gases, poor ventilation, and other accidents that were caused by the poor management of their employers, whose only object was to increase their capital with no remorse to the loss of life, limbs, or health of their employees.

The constitution also laid out the formation of the union, in which practicing miners were formed into Lodges, who were formed into Districts, and supervised by the General Board who also represented the association in the corporate capacity.

The General Board consisted of one president, one vice-president, one treasurer, and one delegate who were elected from each lodge in the association. The officers of the General Board were elected by delegates and held their positions for two years. They were required to meet once a year, unless a special meeting was called. Information from the meetings were reported and printed through the Weekly Miner, a publication that was directed and edited by John Hinchcliffe, the second president of the American Miners’ Association. The Weekly Miner was essential in keeping the union up to date in current events.

The constitution also provided the duties of each executive officer. The president was responsible for presiding over all the meetings in the board and appointed all necessary committees. He was subjected to the approval of the delegates in session and received applications for admission of new Lodges into the association. The vice-president was responsible in performing the duties of the president if absent. The financial secretary was responsible for receiving the money and drafts that were paid to the General Board and record all financial affairs. He is then responsible to turn in all the money to the treasurer at the end of each General Board meeting or before the expiration of every three months. The corresponding secretary was responsible for recording everything in meetings, communicating with the press and distant members of officers in the association, and received post office orders, communications, parcels, papers or periodicals. Finally, the treasurer was responsible for receiving all money and credit that belong or pertained to the General Board.

Along with the government and powers of the General Board, the constitution also provided general laws that members were to follow. These were various and included procedures that kept the officers from corruption, membership fees and monthly dues, penalties for failure to pay, and punishment for acting uncivil, failing to make the meetings, or disobeying the General Laws or By-Laws that were provided.

== Growth in the face of public scrutiny ==
The American Miners’ Association was not long confined within the Belleville Tract and Missouri. It made rapid strides eastward to form the districts of Braidwood, Illinois, and La Salle, Illinois. In March 1863, the Tuscarawas Valley in Ohio formed its own district under the name Massillon Miners’ Association. Unlike the American Miners’ Association, Massillon Miners’ Association provided regulation of work in mines and careful government of the association in the constitution. Along with other branches that were formed during its brief existence, the districts were all members of the branch of the Belleville headquarters.

=== Civil War ===
When the Civil War was about to break out in 1861, labor workers and leaders were well aware of the advantages it might produce to spread a national union. When millions of workingmen were pulled from their occupation, either from farms, workshops, mines, and other industrial professions, labor in these fields were scarce. With the lack of labor and an unparalleled demand for coal, which was in response to the creation of war industries that manufactured firearms, ammunition, naval vessels, armaments, etc., the need for experience workers was drastic. Because the demand for experienced miners far exceeded the supply of coal, wages in mines rose to three or four times its former value. When word of these high wages and need for experienced miners reached the ear of British workers in England, thousands emigrated to the United States and took advantage of the situation by enjoying high wages and bargaining rights.

=== Public scrutiny ===
Although rapid strides in the advancement of this national union were accomplished, they were still done under a great deal of public scrutiny. As stated earlier with the fall of local organizations, coal miners in the United States were often misunderstood and unfavorably judged, more than any other class of laborers in the world. The prejudice beliefs that were forced upon them were traced to the corporations that employed them. And because union meetings often took place in public spaces, journalist were known to infiltrated them in order to spread rumors of barbaric and uncivilized tactics. However, it was during times of strikes that newsletters would publish unfair and unverifiable images of miners. This was a major problem because it provided no fair representation to the miners or their grievances.

== Fall of the organization ==
=== End of Civil War ===
When the Civil War ended, soldiers who originally left their position returned to their work and war industries that required large amount of coal were shut down. With the increase in workers and decrease in coal, competition among producers resulted in extreme measures. Contractors cut the prices of their coal in order to make contracts in an already dull market. As a result, wages for miners were drastically cut and strikes ensued. During the first year of the Civil War, strikes were somewhat successful with the former rate of wages restored. However, as strikes slowly began to be unsuccessful, internal dissension destroyed the union from the inside.

=== Strikes ===
The strikes that the union participated in generally dealt with wage cuts. Union representatives argued that the wage cuts were unwarranted and unjust. However, companies argued that they were allowed to cut the wages when the market was damaged. Although successful during the first year after the Civil War, unions eventually started to lose strikes. The strikes of 1867 and 1868 eventually brought the American Miners’ Association down all over the country, resulting in internal dissensions among labor leaders, members, and officers.
