= Ellis N. Johnson Jr. =

American politician (1826–1902)

Member of the Ohio House of Representatives from the Stark County district
- In office 1870–1874 Serving with Samuel C. Bowman
- Preceded by: Joseph Dilworth and Joseph Thompson
- Succeeded by: Edward Brook and Johnson Sherrick

Personal details
- Born: May 22, 1826 Mount Union, Stark County, Ohio, U.S.
- Died: July 27, 1902 (aged 76)
- Spouse: Jane Scott (m. 1853)
- Children: 1
- Education: Mount Union College
- Alma mater: Marlborough College; Cleveland Law School
- Occupation: Politician; educator; civil servant

Ellis N. Johnson Jr. (May 22, 1826 – July 27, 1902) was an American politician and educator from Ohio. He founded Southwestern Normal School (later California University of Pennsylvania) in 1852. He served as a member of the Ohio House of Representatives from 1870 to 1874.

== Early life ==
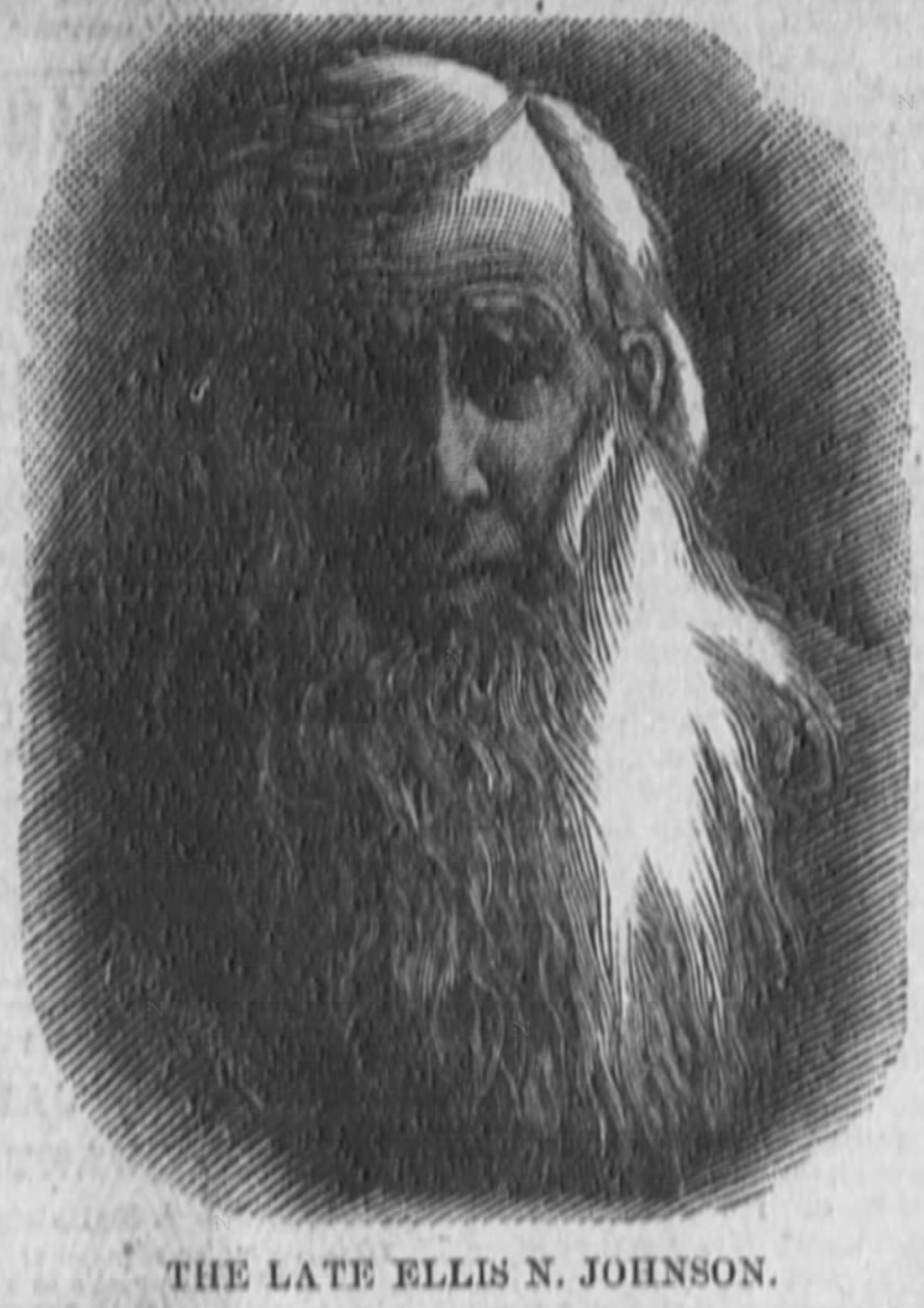
Sketch of Ellis N. Johnson Sr. in 1889

Ellis N. Johnson Jr. was born on May 22, 1826, to Doreas (née Moffat) and Ellis N. Johnson (1789–1889), in Mount Union, Stark County, Ohio. His father was a surgeon, abolitionist, and served as mayor of Mount Union, justice of the peace and surveyor. His uncle was Job Johnson, an incorporator of Washington, Pennsylvania. Johnson graduated from Marlborough College. He also attended Mount Union College. He later graduated from Cleveland Law School.

== Career ==
Johnson taught at Mount Union College. In 1852, Johnson founded Southwestern Normal School (later named California University of Pennsylvania) in Washington, Pennsylvania. He was its first principal, serving from 1852 to 1860. After graduating from Cleveland Law School, he returned to teach in Alliance.

Johnson served in the Ohio House of Representatives from 1870 to 1874. He was appointed by Secretary of the Treasury John Sherman to a position in the U.S. Department of the Treasury. He then worked three years in the U.S. Department of War. He served as special examiner in the U.S. Pension Office for four years.

== Personal life ==
Johnson married Jane Scott in 1853. She worked as a teacher. They had one son, James W. He was a member of the Presbyterian Church.

Johnson died on July 27, 1902, at the age of 77.
