= 177th Ohio Infantry Regiment =

- Active: October 9, 1864, to July 7, 1865
- Country: United States
- Allegiance: Union
- Branch: Infantry
- Engagements: Third Battle of Murfreesboro; Carolinas campaign; Battle of Town Creek

The 177th Ohio Infantry Regiment, sometimes 177th Ohio Volunteer Infantry (or 177th OVI) was an infantry regiment in the Union Army during the American Civil War.

== Service ==
The 177th Ohio Infantry was organized at Camp Cleveland in Cleveland, Ohio, and mustered in for one year service on October 9, 1864, under the command of Colonel Arthur T. Wilcox.

The regiment was attached to Defenses of the Nashville & Chattanooga Railroad, Department of the Cumberland, to January 1865. 2nd Brigade, 3rd Division, XXIII Corps, Army of the Ohio, and Department of North Carolina, to June 1865.

The 177th Ohio Infantry mustered out of service June 24, 1865, at Greensboro, North Carolina, and was discharged July 7, 1865.

== Detailed service ==
Ordered to Nashville, Tenn.; thence to Tullahoma, Tenn., and garrison duty there under General Milroy until November 30. Ordered to Murfreesboro, Tenn., November 30, arriving there December 2. Siege of Murfreesboro December 5–12, 1864. Wilkinson's Pike, near Murfreesboro, December 7. Near Murfreesboro December 13–14. Ordered to Clifton, Tenn., and duty there until January 16, 1865. Moved to Washington, D.C., then to Fort Fisher, N.C., January 16-February 7. Operations against Hoke February 11–14. Near Sugar Loaf Battery February 11. Fort Anderson February 18–19. Town Creek February 19–20. Capture of Wilmington February 22. Campaign of the Carolinas March 1-April 26. Advance on Goldsboro March 6–21. Occupation of Goldsboro March 21, Advance on Raleigh April 10–14. Occupation of Raleigh April 14. Bennett's House April 26. Surrender of Johnston and his army. Duty at Raleigh and Greensboro until June.

One of the 177th: Lincoln's Double. Elmer Loomis, of Girard, Kans., bears the distinction of being the "double" of Abraham Lincoln, and has since he was a young boy. He is 80 years old now and a veteran of the Civil War. During the closing days of the conflict he was detailed as a nurse to Douglas hospital at Washington, and here Lincoln saw him often, and spoke to him and smiled in his slow way, but never mentioned the similarity which was so apparent. Just before the close of the war Lincoln took Loomis to the White House for luncheon. The affair was brief, but nevertheless a fact, and Loomis bears that honor and memory as his most precious possession. Mr. Loomis wears garments of "Lincoln style," and appears in them at national G. A. R. encampments. During the war he was a member of the One Hundred and Seventy-seventh Ohio infantry. Now he is a retired farmer and is known to his neighbors affectionately as "Uncle Abe."

== Casualties ==
The regiment lost a total of 84 enlisted men during service; 2 killed and 82 due to disease.

== Commanders ==
- Colonel Arthur T. Wilcox
- Lieutenant Colonel William H. Zimmerman - commanded during the Carolinas Campaign

== See also ==
- List of Ohio Civil War units
- Ohio in the Civil War
