= Million Dollar Round Table =

Financial trade association

Logo of the Million Dollar Round Table.

The Million Dollar Round Table (MDRT) is a trade association formed in 1927 to help insurance brokers and financial advisors establish best business practices and develop ethical and effective ways to increase client interest in financial products, specifically risk based products like life insurance, disability and long term care. As of the end of 2008 the organization has more than 39,000 members in 82 countries and territories.

== History ==
The group was founded by 32 successful life insurance agents who met at the Peabody Hotel in Memphis, Tennessee during the annual meeting of the National Association of Life Underwriters (NALU). Their meeting focused on improving technical knowledge and enhancing their sales abilities as well as maintaining ethical standards in the industry, and from the beginning the organization adopted the NALU Code of Ethics. The 1927 meeting resulted in the formation of the MDRT organization.

The group grew quickly, reaching 118 members by 1930 and exceeding 1,000 members by 1952. By 1976 it had 11,804 members and had introduced an elite qualification of "Top of the Table" for members who could show a single year premium production of US$5 million.

== Activities ==
MDRT conducts annual meetings that are open to all members, and which include a variety of activities for members professional development. These meetings are held in North America and Asia. Each year more than 10,000 members and guests attend.

MDRT uses the concept of the "whole person," which was first presented by philosopher Mortimer Adler. According to Adler, "whole [persons] are engaged in a lifetime quest to achieve balance and congruity in all aspects of their lives and continually seek to develop their full human potential."

Insurers sometimes promote their agents' success in achieving MDRT membership claiming, among other things, that MDRT promotes skills development, and that such agents generate higher premium policies and more persistent business.

Annual qualification requirements for joining include demonstrating a set annual production requirement plus agreeing to adhere to a strict code of ethics. Ethical violations will result in dismissal. MDRT also has established two additional tiers of qualification: Court of the Table and Top of the Table. To qualify for these higher tiers of membership, the applicant must demonstrate annual commission of first year income three to six times the base requirement.

In 2023 a court in Ontario, Canada dismissed a claim against MDRT by a policyholder who claimed their loss, allegedly due to a fraud by a member who used the MDRT logo, had been caused by negligent regulation by MDRT. The court acknowledged the organization ran somewhat like a regulator but refused to find that it caused the policyholder's loss.
