= William Huber =

American labor leader

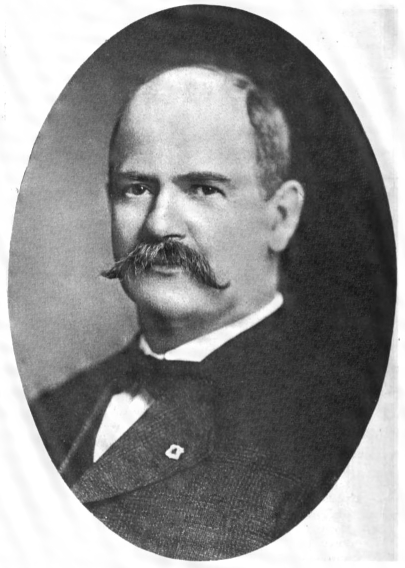
- Born: 1852; Waterloo, New York, US
- Died: September 1925 (aged 72–73); Cincinnati, Ohio, US
- Occupations: Carpenter, labor leader

William D. Huber (1852–1925) was a carpenter and an American labor leader.

== Biography ==
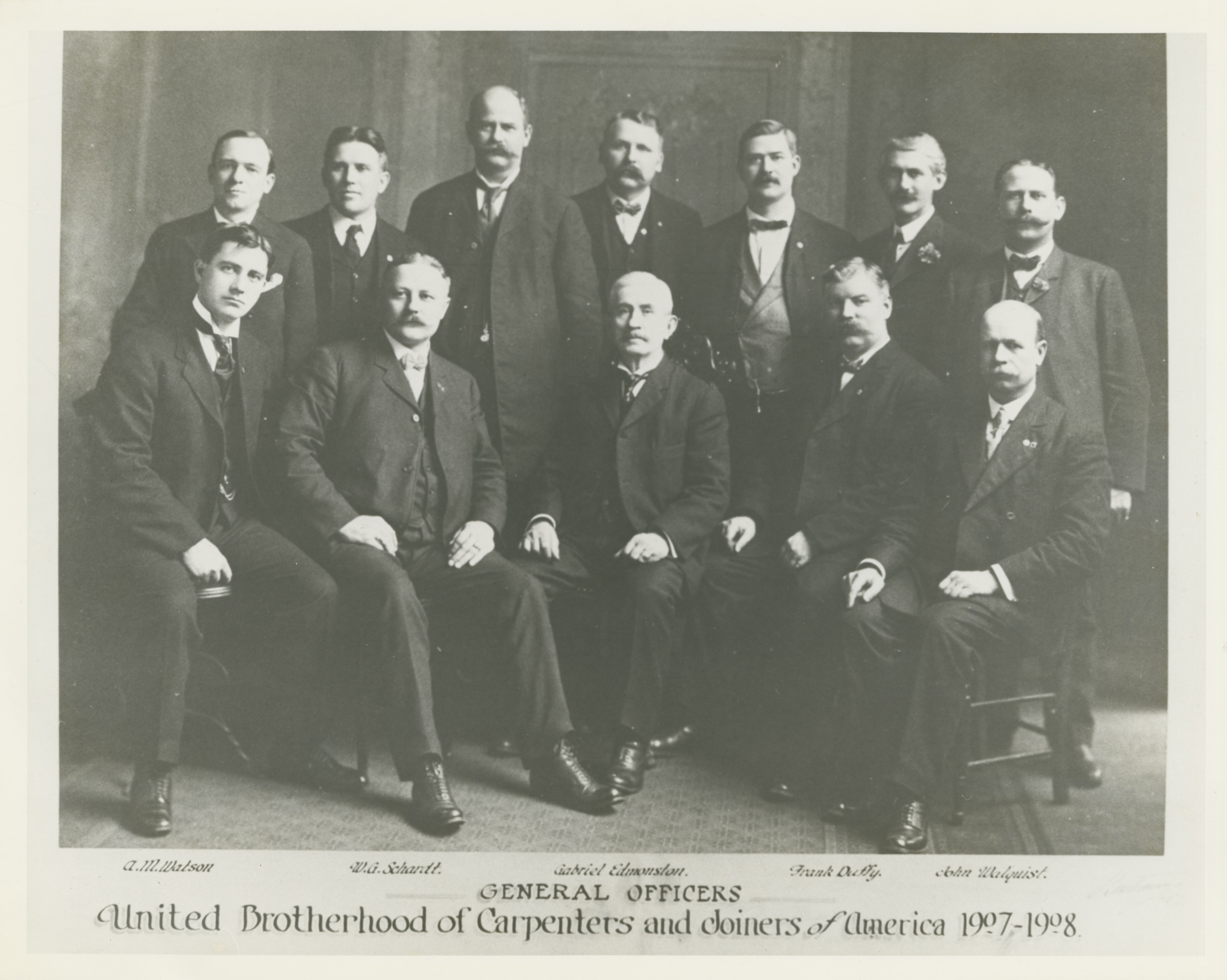
General Officers of the United Brotherhood of Carpenters and Joiners of America, 1907-08. Top row, from left: T.M. Guerin, Arthur A. Quinn, William Huber, D.A. Post, Thomas Neale, R.E.L. Connolly, P.H. McCarthy. Bottom row, from left: A.M. Watson, W.G. Schardt, Gabriel Edmonston, Frank Duffy, John Walquist.

Born in Waterloo, New York, Huber completed an apprenticeship as a carpenter. He soon became a foreman, working in Canisteo, New York, then to New York City, and on to Yonkers. He joined the United Brotherhood of Carpenters and Joiners of America in 1894, founding a new local in Yonkers. He was elected as vice-president of the union in 1898, and then as president in 1899.

As president of the Carpenters, Huber built a powerful personal machine among the international union's organizers. He expanded the union's jurisdictional claims, and forced the American Federation of Labor to formally recognize and enforce the union's jurisdiction. He was also a critic of racial discrimination within the union.

After his election, Huber was ordered by the international union's executive board to assist founder and general secretary-treasurer Peter J. McGuire with his duties. But McGuire's failing health, alcoholism and general unpleasantness led Huber to abandon this role. Huber, along with Frank Duffy, was one of a group of union leaders who sought to force McGuire into retirement. He personally presented the charges of incompetence and corruption which led to McGuire's dismissal from the union in 1902.

Huber was a key figure in the formation of the Structural Building Trades Alliance in 1902. He also led raids on the American Wood Workers Union, and forced the union to merge with the Carpenters in 1912.

Huber did not get along well with the generally autonomous members of the international union's executive board. Although he was able to win passage of constitutional amendments that centralized power within the office of the international president, he was exhausted by the battles with the board.

Huber retired as president of the Carpenters at the end of his term in 1912, becoming a traveling representative for the union. He was succeeded as president by James Kirby.

He died in Cincinnati in September 1925.

Trade union offices
Preceded by John Williams	President of the United Brotherhood of Carpenters and Joiners of America; 1899–1912	Succeeded by James Kirby
Preceded by Daniel Keefe	Seventh Vice-President of the American Federation of Labor; 1905–1908	Succeeded by Joseph F. Valentine
Preceded by Daniel Keefe	Sixth Vice-President of the American Federation of Labor; 1908–1909	Succeeded by Joseph F. Valentine
Preceded by Denis A. Hayes	Fifth Vice-President of the American Federation of Labor; 1909–1913	Succeeded by John R. Alpine
