= National Building Trades Council =

Former trade union of the United States

The National Building Trades Council (NBTC) was an American federation of labor unions in the construction industry. It was active from 1897 to 1903.

The organization's primary goal was to provide a forum in which jurisdictional conflicts between trade unions could be adjudicated. But as a voluntary federation, the organization lacked the power to enforce its rulings. Many national and international construction industry unions refused to join the NBTC, further limiting its influence.

Although many of the NBTC's members belonged to the American Federation of Labor (AFL), the organization was not part of the AFL.

== Precursor organizations ==
In the late 19th century, the construction industry in the United States was in transition, and this transition led to large and frequent jurisdictional conflicts between labor unions. Small buildings (usually no more than five stories high) were giving way to skyscrapers. Whereas most buildings had been constructed primarily of wood, cut stone and plaster, now metal framing and trim, reinforced concrete, prefabricated materials, and man-made tiles were becoming the norm. Proliferation in new building techniques and materials led to an increase in specialized construction professions. This, in turn, led to the formation of unions for these specialty professions, and fights over which union's members would perform the work.

The nature of the construction industry at the time also concentrated power in the hands of local rather than regional or national unions.

In an industry that was essentially local as far as actual building construction was concerned, local unions were the heart of the building trades movement. Primarily interested in controlling local work for local members, they lobbied politicians to enact building codes and licensing laws to protect work standards and union jobs. They hired full-time business agents ("walking delegates") to police their trade agreements and to ensure that contractors actually paid the men, and allied themselves with other local unions in building trades councils to support one another's strikes.

Local construction unions made their own work-rules and played their own political games, and national and international union constitutions respected the autonomy of the local union by requiring the consent of local unions in the enactment of national union policies or by providing for optional participation in the programs of the national union.

These jurisdictional disputes only became more frequent and intractable over time. Jurisdictional disputes occupied much of the time and attention of the American Federation of Labor. "So much time was consumed by the individual unions involved in these disputes that it often left little for anything else." Nearly 95 percent of all strikes from 1897 to 1914 involved unions striking over which workers were to perform which jobs.

Increasingly, the debate involved a growing battle over craft versus industrial unionism. Certain unions—such as the Teamsters, the Amalgamated Association of Iron and Steel Workers, and the National Union of United Brewery Workmen—were already industrial unions in all but name, and vigorous battles were fought within the AFL to pare back the jurisdictions of these industrial unions.

== Formation of local building trades councils ==
Even as jurisdictional battles increased, local building trades councils had formed in most major cities by 1897. A "Board of Walking Delegates" was formed in New York City in 1884, and the Chicago Building Trades Council—the first true local building trades organization—formed in 1890. These local building trades councils not only enforced jurisdictional rules by calling sympathy strikes, but also built support for unions when they went on strike.

But local building trades councils were often ineffective. When an employer gave work to one union, a rival union would strike to force the employer to give the work to its members. These jurisdictional strikes often led to the shut-down of entire construction sites, throwing all employees out of work. The winner of a jurisdictional strike more often than not was also the union which had more power—either more members, or members whose work was critical to construction work (such as "operating engineers")—rather than the union whose workers were best suited for the job.

== National Building Trades Council ==
In 1897, a group of building trades unions from the Midwest met in St. Louis to form a national organization. The new group, the National Building Trades Council, would adjudicate jurisdictional battles through neutral arbitration and encourage the amalgamation of construction and building unions. The NBTC also encouraged the formation of local and regional building trades councils, established a correspondence committee to keep unions informed of jurisdictional decisions and collective bargaining trends, worked to create a national work card system, lobbied for laws requiring an eight-hour day, and lobbied for laws creating mechanics liens.

But the NBTC was often as ineffective as local councils. Many national and international unions refused to join. The NBTC's respect for local union autonomy often meant that local unions set jurisdictional policy for national unions, a situation national unions could not accept. Local autonomy also meant that jurisdictional decisions in one area held no weight in another, creating a patchwork of different jurisdictional rules nationwide. Membership on the local level was also spotty, hurting local council finances and undercutting the weight of local council decisions. Because the NBTC permitted not only unions belonging to the AFL but also independent union to join, the AFL formally accused the group of dual unionism in 1899 and proceeded to establish building trades councils of its own.

The ineffectiveness of the National Building Trades Council and pressure on member unions from the AFL led Frank Duffy, president of the United Brotherhood of Carpenters and Joiners of America, to form the Structural Building Trades Alliance (SBTA) in 1903. With most of its members participating in the SBTA, NBTC struggled to remain relevant. It became moribund in 1907, and disbanded in 1921.
