= North Atlantic States Regional Council of Carpenters =

The North Atlantic States Regional Council of Carpenters (NASRCC) is a labor union that represents carpenters in Massachusetts, New York, Connecticut, Rhode Island, New Hampshire, Maine and Vermont. It represents over 30,000 members in trades like carpentry, pile driving, shop and millmen, millwright work, and floorcovering. It is part of the United Brotherhood of Carpenters and Joiners of America.

== History ==
The NASRCC started as the New England Regional Council of Carpenters in 1997. In 2018, it absorbed five UBCJA locals that had been previously affiliated with the Northeast Regional Council of Carpenters following its dissolution by UBCJA President Douglas McCarron. The reason for the dissolution was reported as Northeast Regional Council Executive Secretary-Treasurer John Ballantyne's close political relationship with New Jersey governor Phil Murphy. In 2019, McCarron ordered the New England Regional Council of Carpenters to change its name to the North Atlantic States Regional Council of Carpenters.

== Structure and leadership ==
The NASRCC today comprises the following locals:

- Floorcoverers Local 2168
- Local 276 (Rochester and Buffalo)
- Local 277 (Binghamton, Syracuse, and Horesheads)
- Local 279
- Local 290
- Local 291
- Local 326
- Local 327
- Local 328
- Local 1302 (Electric Boat)

Its past presidents include the following:

- David Dow (1996–7)
- David Bergeron (1997–2001)
- Thomas Harrington (2001–5)
- Mark Erlich (2005–2017)
- Tom Flynn (2017–2021)
- Joseph Byrne (2021–present)
