= Structural Building Trades Alliance =

The Structural Building Trades Alliance (SBTA) was an American federation of labor unions in the construction industry. It was founded in 1903 and existed until 1908, when it affiliated with the American Federation of Labor (AFL) and became the Building Trades Department.

The organization's primary goal was to provide a forum in which jurisdictional conflicts between trade unions could be adjudicated. But the organization lacked the power to enforce its rulings. Under pressure from competing AFL building trades councils and repeated threats of disaffiliation by its own members, it affiliated with the AFL in 1908.

== Precursor organizations ==
In the late 19th century, the construction industry was in transition, and this transition led to large, frequent jurisdictional conflicts between labor unions. Proliferation in new building techniques and materials led to an increase in specialized construction professions, which in turn led to the establishment of numerous small specialty unions and fights over which union's members would perform the work. The nature of the construction industry at the time also concentrated power in the hands of local rather than regional or international unions.

Jurisdictional disputes between unions became more frequent and intractable over time, occupying much of the attention of the American Federation of Labor (AFL). Nearly 95 percent of all strikes from 1897 to 1914 were jurisdictional strikes. Increasingly, the debate involved a growing battle over craft versus industrial unionism.

Even as jurisdictional battles increased, local building trades councils had formed in most major cities by 1897. But local building trades councils were often ineffective.

In 1897, a group of building trades unions from the Midwest formed the National Building Trades Council (NBTC) to adjudicate jurisdictional battles and encourage the amalgamation of construction and building unions. But the NBTC structure also proved unworkable. Many national and international unions refused to join, few unions abided by its jurisdictional decisions, and membership on the local level was spotty. The (AFL) accused the group of dual unionism in 1899 and subsequently established its own building trades councils.

The National Building Trades Council lost whatever effectiveness it had in 1903 after the formation of the Structural Building Trades Alliance. It survived until 1921, then disbanded. http://www.derrickrosemvp.com/

== Formation of the SBTA ==
Formation of the Structural Building Trades Alliance was prompted by a series of strikes and the beginning of the open shop movement in 1903. A wave of jurisdictional strikes in 1903 all but shut down construction in most major cities in the United States. Building contractor associations were also forming in several large cities, forcing unions to accept contracts which prohibited sympathy strikes, banned restrictions on the kind of work an employee might perform, and permitted the unlimited introduction of new machinery, materials and working methods. Employers were also pushing hard for an end to the closed shop, which threatened unions' membership gains.

In response, certain labor leaders advocated the formation of a new organization that avoided the faults of the NBTC. Frank Duffy, secretary-general of the Carpenters union, argued for the creation of a new organization which would be independent of but aligned with the AFL, and which would balance the power of local unions with that of national and international parent bodies. Duffy may also have seen the new organization as a way of forcing the AFL to stop chartering specialty construction unions.

The SBTA was formed in Chicago during a conference of building trades unions held from October 7 to October 10, 1903. The new organization firmly declared its allegiance to the AFL (but did not seek to join the federation), and refused to admit unions which did not belong to the federation. The SBTA admitted only large, amalgamated unions as members in an attempt to lessen jurisdictional struggles, and permitted only representatives of national and international unions to have a voice in organization affairs. George P. Gubbins, president of the International Union of Bricklayers and Allied Craftworkers, was elected the SBTA's first president. William J. Spencer, head of organizing for the Plumbers, was elected secretary-treasurer. Seven vice presidents representing the Carpenters, Electrical Workers, Iron Workers, Laborers, Operating Engineers, Painters and Plasterers were also elected. Election for an eighth vice-presidential slot would be held later. Jurisdictional disputes were to be resolved by a majority vote of the SBTA's Board of Governors (the two officers and eight vice-presidents), with voting based on a one union-one vote scheme.

== Struggles ==
The SBTA struggled in its first year. Despite Gubbins' election as president, Bricklayer locals refused to approve the international union's participation in the SBTA. Vice-president Frank Duffy to charge as acting president in Gubbins' place. The Iron Workers along with the Plasterers and Electrical Workers failed to send delegates to SBTA's first convention in the summer of 1904, but Frank Buchanan, president of the Iron Workers, was elected SBTA president all the same.

SBTA members began to broaden the organization's membership to specialty unions in 1905. The Gas and Steam Fitters, Tile Layers, Composition Roofers, Elevator Constructors and Lathers all petitioned for membership. But these membership petitions threatened the SBTA's fragile governing coalition. All SBTA members but the Plumbers were in favor of admitting the Gas and Steam Fitters; all SBTA members but the Iron Workers were in favor of admitting the Lathers. When locals of the Bricklayers, Electrical Workers and Plasterers unions refused to approve their respective unions' membership in the Alliance, these international unions were forced to withdraw from the group. The remaining SBTA members immediately voted to admit the five specialty unions, a move which then led the Iron Workers to withdraw. James Kirby, president of the Chicago District Council of the Carpenters' union, was elected president as his replacement.

Friction with the AFL continued as well. Spencer was elected an AFL vice president in 1904, which significantly lessened the AFL's suspicions regarding the SBTA. In March 1905, the AFL assisted the SBTA in a conflict with contractors in New York City. But local SBTA and AFL building trades councils continued to fight with one another, and repeated jurisdictional battles and calls for sympathy strikes weakened SBTA local alliances.

SBTA also struggled to enforce its rules without causing additional disaffiliations. SBTA president Kirby successfully established many new local councils, and resolved conflicts which threatened to sunder existing ones. But the Alliance's one union-one vote rule often meant that smaller specialty unions were easily able to build majorities to sanction larger unions for infringement on speciality union jurisdiction. The offended larger union would then threaten to withdraw from the local alliance, taking its dues and influence with contractors went with it. Local alliances would then ask the national SBTA to enforce the rules. Kirby and Spencer were sympathetic to the demands made by local councils, but often refused to take any enforcement action for fear that the large unions would disaffiliate.

== AFL-CIO affiliation and disestablishment ==
Pressure built in 1907 which eventually ended the SBTA's existence as an independent organization.

In January 1907, the Painters petitioned the SBTA to form a council in New York City. The union was supported by the Tile Layers and Plumbers unions. Building and construction painting in New York City was controlled at the time by an independent union. The Painters wished to strike contractors who employed workers belonging to the independent union. A local SBTA alliance in New York would mean that the other unions would be forced to honor the Painters' jurisdictional strike—bringing the superior numbers of the other SBTA unions to bear on the contractors. Unwilling to be dragged into such a conflict, the SBTA Board of Governors voted against forming a council in New York City. The Painters disaffiliated, significantly reducing the Alliance's membership and income.

Kirby could not prevent the Painters' disaffiliation, but he could try to alleviate some of the organization's other problems and thereby try to save the SBTA. Kirby met with the AFL executive council in June 1907 to discuss the conflict between SBTA and AFL local building trades councils. The AFL executive council agreed to send a delegation led by President Samuel Gompers to meet with the SBTA Board of Governors to resolve their differences. At a meeting in October 1907, SBTA President Kirby suggested that the AFL charter the SBTA, just as it would any central labor body. The idea was an old one. In 1903, AFL vice president John P. Frey had advocated that the AFL create an organization that would enable the federation to coordinate the jurisdictions, work assignments, wages, work rules and other aspects of work of its construction unions. Gompers had resisted such suggestions for several years, but Kirby's idea now seemed timely. Building and construction trade unions made up 20 percent of the AFL's membership, and Gompers could not afford to alienate them.

At the AFL convention in November 1907, a plan to issue a charter to the SBTA as a "department" of the AFL was offered to the delegates. Every AFL building and construction trade union was asked to help draft and comment on the plan. The views of observers from the Bricklayers and Plasterers, who were not at the time AFL members, were also solicited. The plan was unanimously adopted.

The founding convention of the Building Trades Department was held in Washington, D.C., on February 10, 1908. Representatives from 19 building trades attended. Breaking with SBTA policy, the delegates agreed to include specialty unions (such as the Slate Roofers, the Composite Roofers, the Soft Stone Cutters and Granite Cutters). The delegates also agreed to a proportional representation scheme, with each union getting one delegate for every 4,000 members. Delegates also agreed to formally push for the creation of state and local building trades councils, although they refused to give these bodies a vote at department conventions. Finally, delegates approved a governance structure composed of a president, secretary-treasurer and six directors. Kirby was elected president, and Spencer secretary-treasurer.

The AFL issued the department's charter on March 20, 1908. The idea of departments within the AFL proved contagious. A Metal Trades Department was chartered on July 2. A Railway Employes' Department (which was dissolved in 1980) was chartered on February 19, 1909, the Union Label Department followed on April 12, and a Mining Department on January 8, 1912.
