= James W. Smith =

James W. Smith may refer to:

- James W. Smith (horse trainer) (1908–1969), American horse trainer
- Jimmy Snuka (James Wiley Smith, 1943–2017), Fijian wrestler
- James Webber Smith (1778–1853), British Royal Artillery officer
- James Webster Smith (1850–1876), first black cadet at West Point
- James W. Smith Jr. (born 1943), American judge, Chief of the Supreme Court of Mississippi
- James W. Smith (trade unionist) (1838–1903), American labor unionist
- James William Smith (fl. 1974), mayor of Kingston upon Hull in 1974

== See also ==
- James William Smith-Betsil (born 1934), American basketball player and political activist
