= James Duncan (union leader) =

Scottish-American trade union leader (1857–1928)

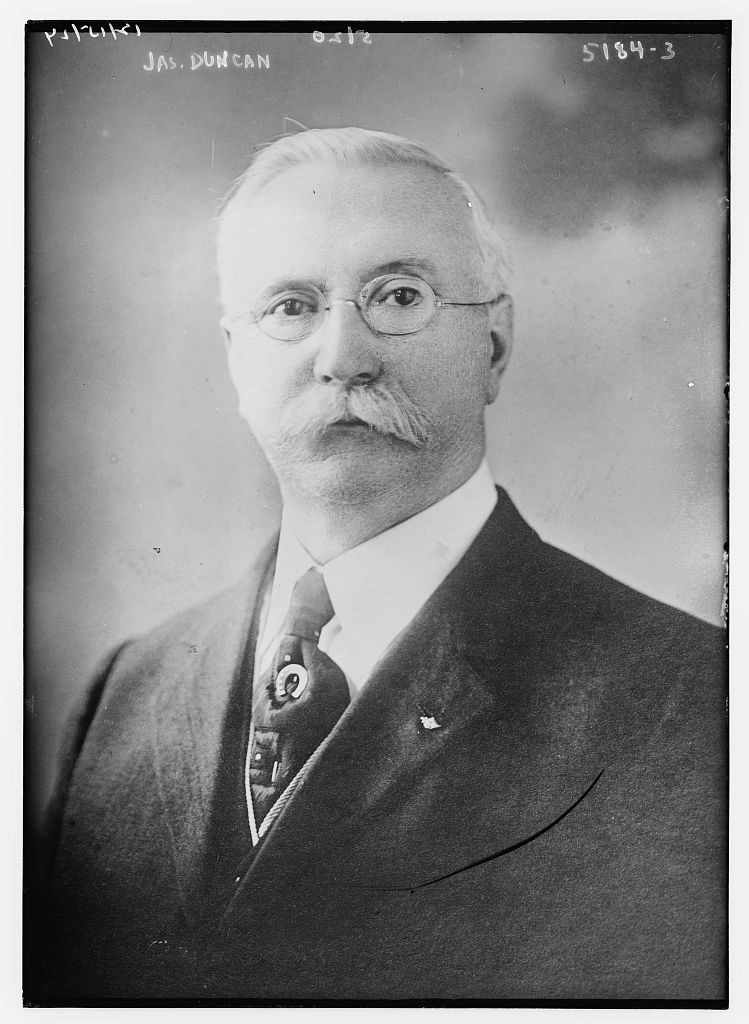
- Duncan circa 1920
- Born: May 5, 1857; Portlethen, Kincardineshire, Scotland, United Kingdom
- Died: September 14, 1928 (aged 71); Quincy, Massachusetts, USA
- Occupations: Trade union leader; granite cutter; president of the Granite Cutters' International Association.
- Known for: Co-founder, American Federation of Labor

James Duncan (May 5, 1857 – September 14, 1928) was a Scottish American union leader, and president of the Granite Cutters' International Association from 1895 until his death in 1928. He was an influential member of the American labor movement, helping to co-found the American Federation of Labor.

== Early life ==
Duncan was born on May 5, 1857, in Portlethen, Kincardineshire in Scotland. His parents were David and Mary (Forbes) Duncan. His father was a farmer, and David was raised Presbyterian. He attended public elementary school in Aberdeen, then apprenticed as a granite cutter.

In 1873, Duncan became a full-fledged granite cutter. His first trade was as a maker of headstones, but he later carved granite statues as well.

Duncan married the former Lillian Holman in 1887. The couple had one child.

== Union career ==
In 1880, Duncan emigrated to the United States and settled in New York City. He joined the Granite Cutters' National Union in 1881, and was elected the local's secretary. Duncan moved to Baltimore, Maryland, in 1884, and joined the Granite Cutters' union in that city as well. He was elected the local union's secretary shortly thereafter.

In May 1895, Duncan was elected secretary of the Granite Cutters' National Union. He was also named the editor of the union's journal, the Granite Cutters' Journal. He moved the union's headquarters to Quincy, Massachusetts, in 1900, where he took up residence. The Granite Cutters' National Union had been organized in 1877 as the Granite Cutters' International Union of the United States and the British Provinces of America. The union's founder and first president was Thompson H. Murch, of Maine. He was elected to Congress in 1878, and was replaced by Josiah B. Dyer. Dyer moved the union's headquarters from Maine to Concord, New Hampshire. The union was, at best, a loose federation of largely independent locals. Although it claimed jurisdiction over and had locals in Canada, the Canadian members were an afterthought to the union. In 1880, the union changed its name to the Granite Cutters' National Union and changed its constitution to reduce its jurisdiction to the United States. During his first few years in office, Duncan proposed and won passage of numerous amendments to the union's constitution, forming the Granite Cutters' National Union into one of the most effective unions in the country. He was not, however, a supporter of civil rights for African Americans. Duncan negotiated several contracts in the Deep South which required employers to fire black granite cutters and hire Eiro-American ones. When the American Federation of Labor (AFL) later complained about the agreements, Duncan strongly defended them and invoked the AFL's principle of autonomy for member unions in defense. The matter was dropped.

In 1886, Duncan attended the founding convention of the American Federation of Labor as a delegate of the Granite Cutters' union. He was elected second vice-president of the AFL in 1894 and served on its executive council, positions he would hold until his death. Duncan became one of Samuel Gompers' closest friends and confidantes. A political independent, Duncan successfully pushed Gompers to avoid making political endorsements and support for a single political party.

In 1900, Duncan led the granite cutters out on a nationwide strike. The strike began on March 1, 1900, and was settled on May 16, 1900, after the intervention of former Senator William Andrews Clark (whose home needed granite for its construction). The strike was successful, and the subsequent collective bargaining agreement made the Granite Cutters' National Union the first American labor union to win the eight-hour day for every single local.

Duncan's success in securing the eight-hour day for his members led him to be elected first vice-president of the AFL later that year.

In 1903, Duncan proposed expanding the union's jurisdiction across North America. His proposal was not approved by the union's national convention, but he won passage of the jurisdictional expansion in 1905. Afterward, the union was known as the Granite Cutters' International Association.

In 1905, Duncan established the first old-age pension plan for union workers in the United States.

Duncan served in a number of capacities for the federal government as well. In 1913, President Woodrow Wilson appointed him to a national commission to study workers' compensation insurance. In June 1917, Wilson appointed Duncan Envoy Extraordinary to Russia. In 1918, Wilson chose Duncan to be one of the American trade union delegates to the Paris Peace Conference. He served as a member of the commission which established the International Labour Organization.

In 1924, Samuel Gompers named Duncan one of the AFL delegates to the Pan-American Federation of Labor in Mexico City. The ailing 74-year-old Gompers collapsed on December 6, and doctors said he did not have long to live. Gompers, Duncan and the AFL delegation rushed back to the United States. When the train reached San Antonio, Texas, on December 12, Gompers was taken to a private home. As he lay dying, Duncan held his hand. Gompers died at 4:10 a.m. on December 13, and Duncan was highly distraught for several hours after his death.

James Duncan was nominated for president of the American Federation of Labor after Gompers' death. But Matthew Woll, not Duncan, was the first choice of the "Gompers faction" on the council. The anti-Gompers faction, led by John L. Lewis, was adamantly opposed to Woll's election. Woll promoted Duncan as the candidate of the status quo, but he was easily defeated by William Green, a member of the United Mine Workers and a man generally considered subservient to Woll and Lewis.

Duncan died at his home in Quincy, Massachusetts, on September 14, 1928.

== Notes ==
Trade union offices
Preceded by Josiah B. Dyer	Leader of the Granite Cutters' International Association; 1895–1923	Succeeded by Samuel Squibb
Preceded by Martin Fox; George E. McNeill	American Federation of Labor delegate to the Trades Union Congress; 1898; With: Henry Demarest Lloyd	Succeeded by James O'Connell; Thomas F. Tracy
Preceded by Charles L. Drummond	Second Vice-President of the American Federation of Labor; 1894–1900	Succeeded by John Mitchell
Preceded by Peter J. McGuire	First Vice-President of the American Federation of Labor; 1900–1928	Succeeded by Frank Duffy
