= Charles F. Burgman =

American labor unionist (1853–1932)

Charles F. Burgman (July 21, 1853 – June 6, 1932) was an American labor unionist.

Born in Hann. Münden in Germany, Burgman completed an apprenticeship in Hamburg, where he joined Ferdinand Lassalle's General German Workers' Association. He then moved to London, where he became involved in the early Marxist movement. In 1873, he left England, intending to join a revolutionary group in the Cuban Ten Years' War, but by the time he reached New York City, the group had collapsed, so he instead joined the 6th Cavalry Regiment of the U.S. Army.

Burgman left the Army after six years, and moved to San Francisco. He tried mining, and then running a tailoring business, but these soon failed. He instead took work as a tailor, and joined the Journeymen Tailors Union. He became chair of the Traders Assembly of San Francisco, a workers' organization which campaigned against Chinese immigration. In 1881, he was elected to represent the Pacific Coast states at the founding conference of the Federation of Organized Trades and Labor Unions (FOTLU). At the conference, he spoke at length against Chinese immigration, and won the federation to his position. He was elected as second vice-president of the federation.

In 1882, Burgman was the co-founder of the Pacific Coast Division of the International Workingmen's Association, and from 1883 to 1885, he was the business manager of Truth, a socialist newspaper published by Burnette Haskell. He then returned to working as a merchant tailor. He joined the Improved Order of Red Men, becoming its state grand secretary, and editor from 1893 to 1899 of its newspaper, Insignia.

In 1899, Burgman moved to Seabreeze, Florida, where he became editor of Freedom, a newspaper on the subject of mental health, which was owned by his mother-in-law. In 1905, he founded the Peninsula Publishing Company, before moving into insurance and real estate. This proved successful, and in 1922, he became chair of the Association of East Coast Chambers of Commerce. In this role, he led the campaign for the construction of the Intracoastal Waterway. He later served as chair of the Florida Inland Navigation District Commission. He was the last survivor of the first executive council of FOTLU, which was later reorganized as the American Federation of Labor.

Trade union offices
Preceded by Federation established	Second Vice-President of the Federation of Organized Trades and Labor Unions; 1881–1882	Succeeded by Gabriel Edmonston
