= Frank Duffy (labor leader) =

American labor leader

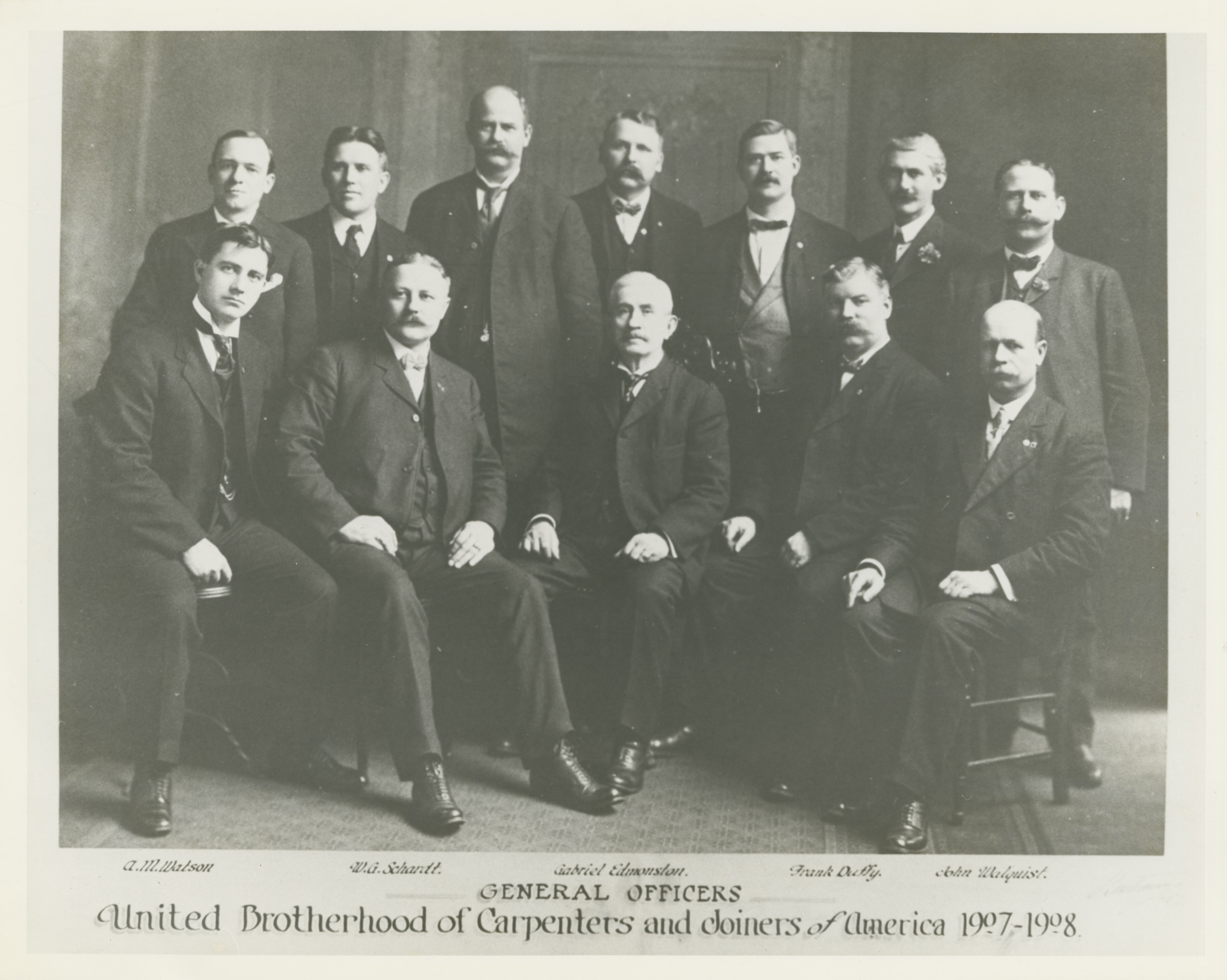
General Officers of the United Brotherhood of Carpenters and Joiners of America, 1907-08. Top row, from left: T.M. Guerin, Arthur A. Quinn, William Huber, D.A. Post, Thomas Neale, R.E.L. Connolly, P.H. McCarthy. Bottom row, from left: A.M. Watson, W.G. Schardt, Gabriel Edmonston, Frank Duffy, John Walquist.

Frank Duffy (6 May 1861 – 11 July 1955) was an American labor leader and secretary-general of the United Brotherhood of Carpenters and Joiners of America from 1901 to 1950.

== Early life and union work ==
Duffy was born in County Monaghan, Ireland, in 1861. He had only a few years of schooling before he married. He and his family emigrated to the United States in 1881. The Duffys settled in New York City, where Duffy became a carpenter.

Duffy joined the United Order of American Carpenters. When the New York City local formed a district council, Duffy was elected its first president. After the United Order merged with the United Brotherhood of Carpenters and Joiners of America in 1888, Duffy was elected to a number of posts in the new Local 478 in New York City.

== UBCJ and AFL-CIO offices ==
In 1900, Duffy was elected to the national executive council of the Carpenters. He played a key role in ousting long-time Carpenters president Peter J. McGuire in 1901. The same year, he was elected the union's general-secretary, a position which he held until 1950. He was a close associate of UBCJ president William Hutcheson.

In 1903, Duffy was elected a vice-president of the nascent Structural Building Trades Alliance, a federation of building and construction trades unions. When the International Union of Bricklayers and Allied Craftworkers refused to join the Alliance, preventing Bricklayer president George P. Gubbins from assuming his duties as Alliance president, Duffy assumed the duties of president for a year until a new president was elected.

In 1918, Duffy was elected a vice-president of the American Federation of Labor. He served until 1940.

In 1919, Duffy served as one of several American labor representatives to the Paris Peace Conference in 1919.

Duffy retired in 1950 at the age of 89. He died in Indianapolis, Indiana, in 1955.

Trade union offices
| Preceded by Peter J. McGuire | General Secretary of the United Brotherhood of Carpenters and Joiners of America; 1901–1948 | Succeeded by Albert E. Fischer |
| Preceded by John R. Alpine | Fourth Vice-President of the American Federation of Labor; 1918–1919 | Succeeded by William Green |
| Preceded by John R. Alpine | Third Vice-President of the American Federation of Labor; 1919–1924 | Succeeded by William Green |
| Preceded by Joseph F. Valentine | Second Vice-President of the American Federation of Labor; 1924–1928 | Succeeded by Thomas A. Rickert |
| Preceded by James Duncan | First Vice-President of the American Federation of Labor; 1928–1939 | Succeeded by William Hutcheson |
