= John Brown Lennon =

American labor union leader

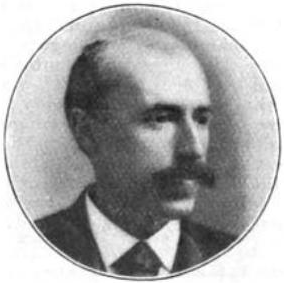
- Born: October 12, 1850; Lafayette County, Wisconsin
- Died: January 17, 1923 (aged 72); Bloomington, Illinois
- Occupation: Labor leader
- Spouses: Juna J. Allen (m. 1871; died 1919) Barbara Egger (m. 1920)

John Brown Lennon (October 12, 1850 - January 17, 1923) was an American labor union leader and general-secretary of the Journeymen Tailors Union of America (JTU). In 1890, he was elected treasurer of the American Federation of Labor and served in that capacity until he was defeated by Teamsters president Daniel J. Tobin in 1917. During World War I, he was appointed by Woodrow Wilson to the U.S. Department of Labor's board of mediators and Commission of Conciliation, and also served on the U.S. Commission of Industrial Relations. In 1919, he supported the formation of the Illinois Labor Party and ran for mayor of Bloomington, Illinois on the Labor Party ticket.

== Early life ==
Lennon was born in Lafayette County, Wisconsin on October 12, 1850 to John Alexander and Elizabeth Fletcher (Brown). In 1852, his family moved to Hannibal, Missouri, where Lennon learned the tailor's trade from his father.

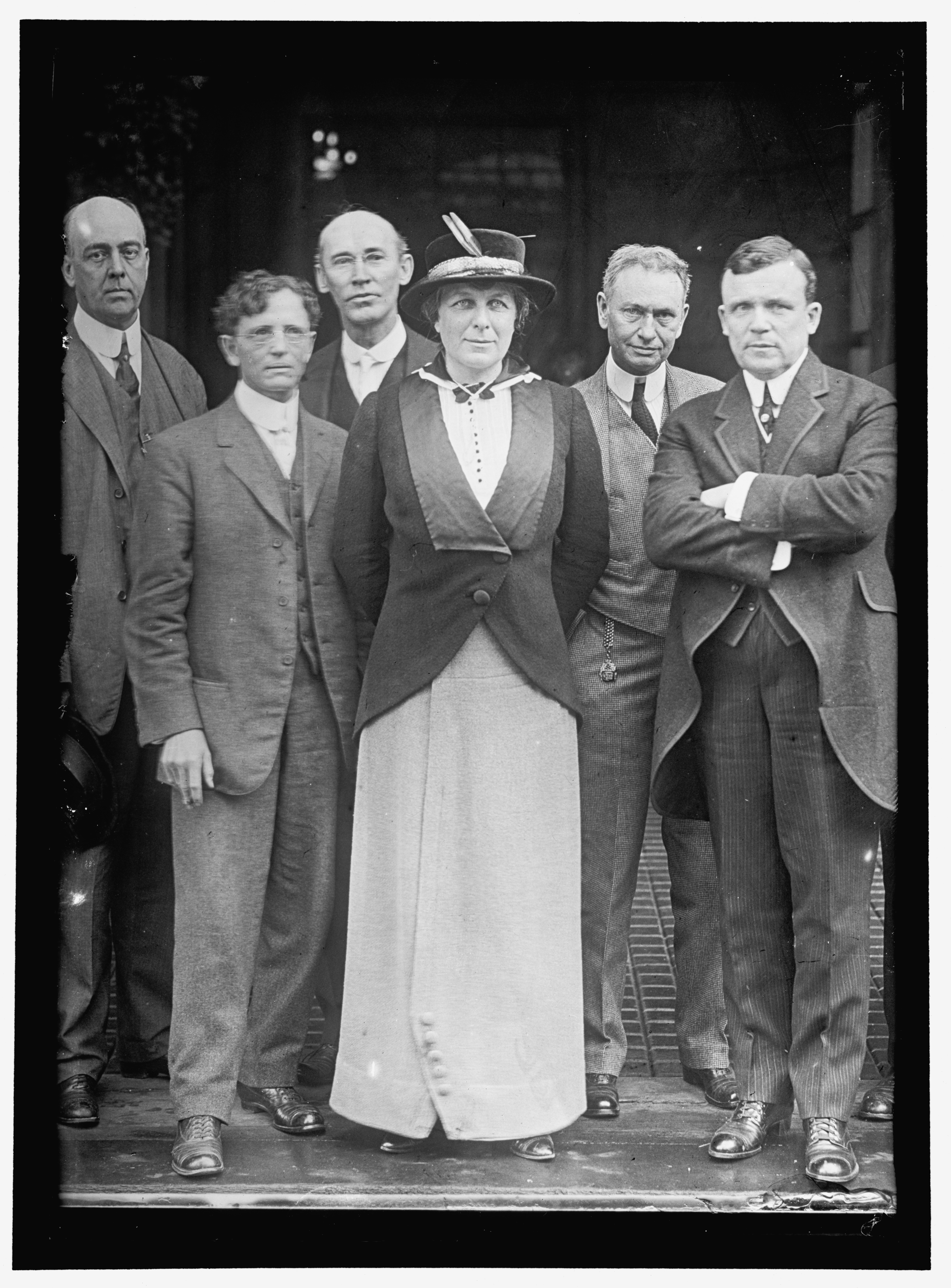

After attending Oberlin College for seven months, Lennon moved to Denver, Colorado, where he worked first as a farmer and miner before returning to the tailor's trade. On April 5, 1871, he married Juna J. Allen and they had one son.

== Union career ==
While working as a tailor in Denver, Lennon's involvement in labor union activity started with his membership in the Journeyman Tailors Union in 1871. He helped organize Denver's central labor council, and also ran for mayor on a labor-socialist ticket.

In the 1880s, he rose quickly in the ranks of the Journeymen Tailors Union (JTU). In 1884, he represented the union in their national re-organization, and in 1885 he was elected vice-president. In 1886, Lennon was elected general secretary of the JTU, the top position in the organization. As one of his duties as JTU general secretary, he edited its official organ of communication, The Tailor. By 1907, the JTU had 22,000 in 400 local unions.

Lennon was elected treasurer of the American Federation of Labor in 1890. He soon became a close associate, and friend, to AFL president Samuel Gompers. In 1894, when Gompers lost the AFL presidency for a year to socialist labor leader John McBride, he worked out of Lennon's New York City office. Both Lennon and Gompers held the conservative AFL labor philosophy of "pure and simple unionism" against socialist and anarchist viewpoints that put forward a larger political project of working-class emancipation through the overthrow of capitalism.

In 1894, the Journeyman Tailors Union under Lennon's leadership faced a blow when it lost half its members due to a disastrous strike in New York. With much of the JTU membership now located in the Midwest, Lennon moved the union headquarters from New York City to Bloomington, Illinois. He would spend the rest of his life in Bloomington, where he was also known for his religious advocacy in the Presbyterian and Unitarian Churches and for the cause of alcohol prohibition through his involvement in the Anti-Saloon League.

Lennon lost the JTU general-secretary position in 1910 to Canadian labor leader and socialist, Eugene Brais. Despite this defeat, he served as the AFL treasurer until Teamsters president Daniel Tobin was elected to the position in 1917.

During World War I, despite his opposition to American involvement in the war, Lennon was appointed by Woodrow Wilson to the U.S. Department of Labor's Commission of Conciliation from 1914 to 1920, and he served on the U.S. Commission on Industrial Relations from 1917-1918. He held hearings during this time period on the issues of private and public employment, efficiency systems and labor, among other issues.

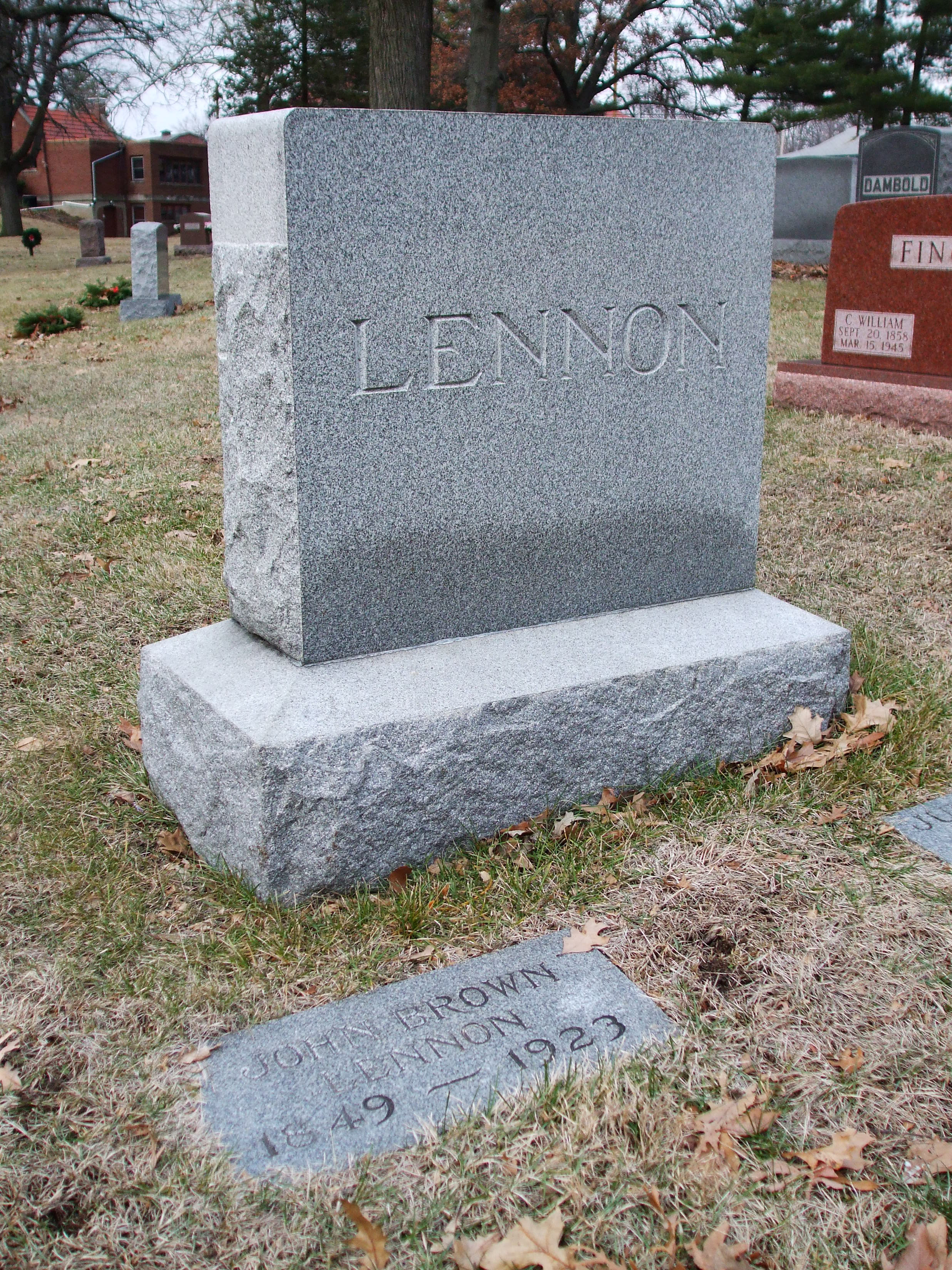
Lennon's grave at Park Hill Cemetery

In 1919, Lennon supported the formation of the Illinois Labor Party, although AFL president Samuel Gompers, his friend and close confidant, opposed the effort. That year he ran for mayor of Bloomington, Illinois on the Labor Party ticket, narrowly losing the election by 286 votes to Republican and incumbent mayor, Edward Jones.

== Death ==
Lennon's wife Juna died on May 6, 1919. On July 1, 1920, he remarried to Barbara Egger.

John Brown Lennon died at his home in Bloomington on January 17, 1923. He is buried in Park Hill Cemetery in Bloomington.

Trade union offices
Preceded by Joseph Wilkinson	General Secretary of the Journeymen Tailors Union; 1887–1910	Succeeded by Eugene J. Brais
Preceded by Gabriel Edmonston	Treasurer of the American Federation of Labor; 1890–1917	Succeeded by Daniel J. Tobin
Preceded by Department founded	President of the Union Label Department; 1909–1911	Succeeded by John F. Tobin
