= James W. Smith (trade unionist) =

Irish American labor activist (1838–1903)

James W. Smith (July 26, 1838 – November 6, 1903) was an Irish-born American labor unionist.

Born in County Carlow in Ireland, Smith's father died when James was young. He and his mother emigrated to the United States in 1850, settling in Boston, where he became a tailor. After marrying, he moved to Cumberland, Maryland. During the U.S. Civil War, he served for a year as a musician with the 2nd Maryland Infantry Regiment, before returning to tailoring.

In 1864, Smith moved to Springfield, Illinois, where he later joined the Journeymen Tailors' National Union of the United States. He was elected as vice-president of the union in 1885, serving until 1887. In 1885, he was also elected as a vice-president of the Federation of Organized Trades and Labor Unions (FOTLU).

In 1886, FOTLU was reorganized as the American Federation of Labor, and Smith was elected as one of its vice-presidents. He additionally served as president of the Illinois State Federation of Labor in 1885/86 and again in 1888/89.

Trade union offices
Preceded by Samuel Gompers	First Vice-President of the Federation of Organized Trades and Labor Unions; 1884–1885	Succeeded by Samuel S. Green
Preceded by William E. Tomson as 2nd VP of FOTLU	Second Vice-President of the American Federation of Labor; 1886–1887	Succeeded by William Martin
