= Charles L. Drummond =

American democratic politician

Charles Lyle Drummond (November 12, 1864 – December 4, 1900) was an American labor unionist and politician.

Born in Rockville, Indiana, Drummond moved with his parents to Huntington, Indiana, when he was an infant. In 1885, he moved to Fort Wayne, Indiana, to work as a typographer for the Fort Wayne Gazette. However, on arriving, he learned that a strike was underway, and the local union, an affiliate of the International Typographical Union (ITU) offered to pay his fare to return to Huntington. Instead, Drummond opted to join the union and go on strike himself.

Drummond later became city editor of the Fort Wayne Sentinel, and also writing on sports under the pen name "Sandy". In addition, he worked as a correspondent for several newspapers in larger cities. In the 1890s, he contributed to the Monday Morning Times, which supported the free silver movement.

Drummond served stints as financial secretary and as president of the ITU local 78. He was a founding delegate of the Fort Wayne Trades and Labor Council in 1889, and was its president in 1893. That year, he was a delegate to the ITU's annual convention. There, he decided to organize the delegates from the small locals, using their combined voting strength to place them on various committees. In return, he was elected as a delegate to the American Federation of Labor (AFL) convention. At that meeting, he was elected as a vice-president of the AFL. During his time in the post, several Chicago newspapers published a fictitious account of a speech in which they claimed he had denounced the Pullman Strike. This damaged his reputation, although he received letters of support from many other unionists, including Eugene V. Debs.

Drummond was active in the Democratic Party, and in 1900 was elected to represent Allen County, Indiana, in the Indiana House of Representatives. However, he died of typhoid before he could take his seat.

Trade union offices
Preceded by William A. Carney	Second Vice-President of the American Federation of Labor; 1893–1894	Succeeded by James Duncan
