= James Kirby =

American labor leader (1865–1915)

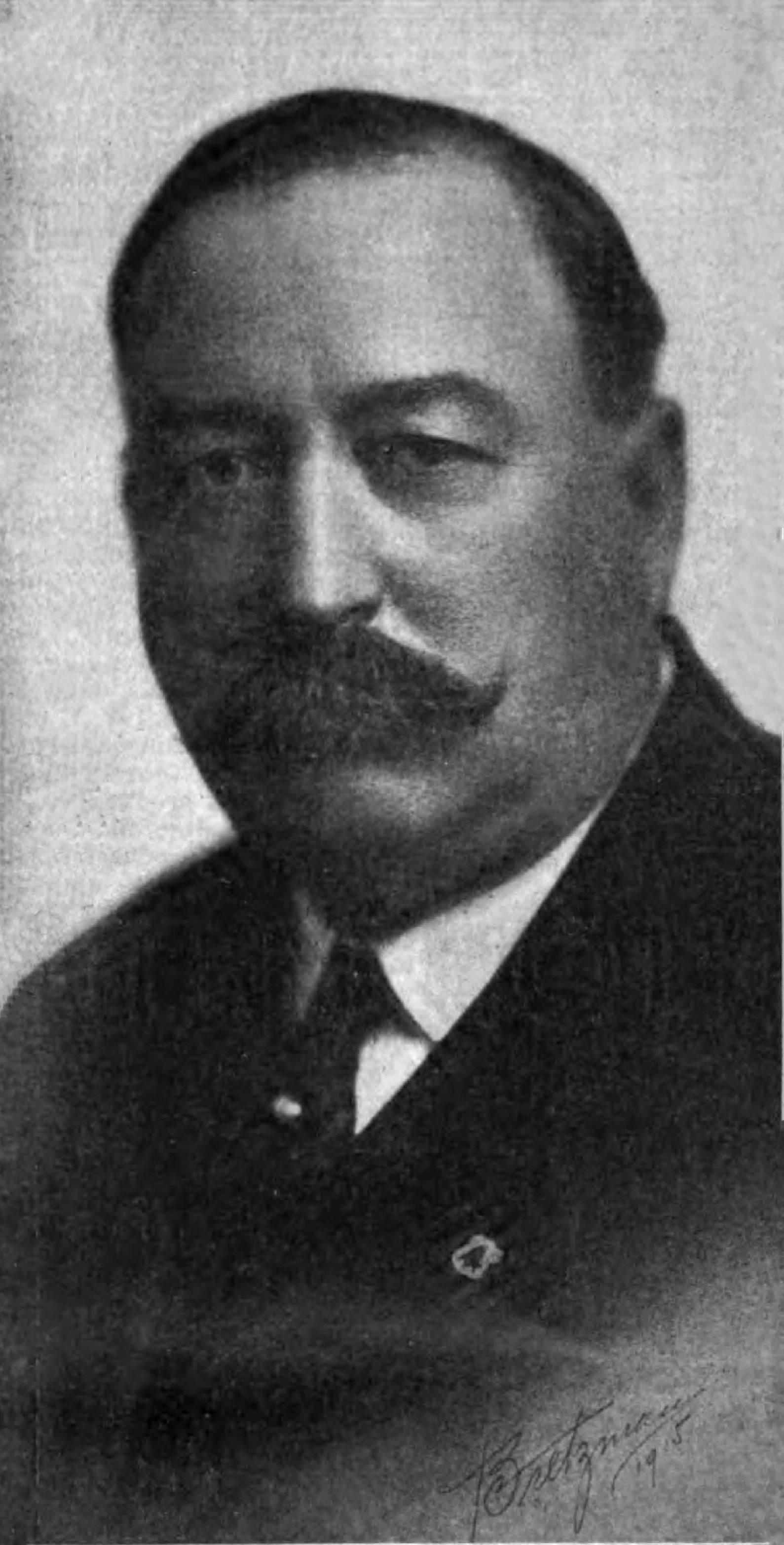
James Kirby c. 1915

James Kirby (c. 1865 – October 8, 1915) was an American labor leader and president of the United Brotherhood of Carpenters and Joiners of America from 1913 to 1915.

Born and raised near Kankakee, Illinois, he went to Chicago shortly after learning his trade as a carpenter, settling in South Chicago where he was a millwright and member of Local 199. He was elected a delegate to the Chicago District Council of the Carpenters' union, and president of the district council several times. In 1905 he was elected president of the Structural Building Trades Alliance. He served until 1908, when the Alliance affiliated with the American Federation of Labor and changed its name to the Building Trades Department (BTD). He was elected president of the BTD and served until 1910.

In 1910, Carpenters president William Huber appointed him "general organizer" for the international union. In 1912, he ran for president of the union and won. He served as president until his death.

When he was elected president of the United Brotherhood, he moved to Indianapolis with his family. He died suddenly after an operation for appendicitis. His funeral was attended by trades union officials from all over the United States.

== Sources ==
- "Glossary." The Samuel Gompers Papers, Vol. 8: Progress and Reaction in the Age of Reform, 1909-13. Stuart J Kaufman, Peter J. Albert, and Grace Palladino, eds. Urbana, Ill.: University of Illinois Press, 2000. ISBN 0-252-02564-4
- Tenner, Gene. "A Rich History Is Alive and Well at Local 272." The Carpenters' Forum. Spring 2006.

Trade union offices
Preceded by Department created	President of the Building Trades Department; 1908–1910	Succeeded by James A. Short
Preceded by William Huber	President of the United Brotherhood of Carpenters and Joiners of America; 1913 – October 8, 1915	Succeeded by William Hutcheson
