= Peter J. McGuire =

American labor leader (1852–1906)

- Born: July 6, 1852; New York City, U.S.
- Died: February 18, 1906 (aged 53)
- Resting place: Arlington Park Cemetery; Pennsauken Township, New Jersey, U.S.
- Occupation: Labor leader
- Children: Lillian, Kathryn, Peter James Jr., Myrtle
- Parent(s): John James McGuire (Ireland, 1822–1882) and Catherine Hand (Ireland, 1818–1889)

Peter J. McGuire (July 6, 1852 – February 18, 1906) was an American labor leader of the nineteenth century. He co-founded the United Brotherhood of Carpenters and Joiners of America in 1881 along with Gustav Luebkert and became one of the leading figures in the first three decades of the American Federation of Labor. He is credited with first proposing the idea of Labor Day as a national holiday in 1882.

== Early life ==
Born in New York City into a poor Irish Catholic family, he was a political activist before he became a trade unionist. He became a member in 1873 of a body known as the Committee for Public Safety, which was agitating for unemployment benefits. McGuire was arrested while occupying the office of the city's Police Commissioner, who had refused to grant them a parade permit. Shortly thereafter, he joined with Adolph Strasser, later president of the Cigar Makers' Union, to found the Social-Democratic Workingmen's Party of North America, a Lassallean socialist organization that proposed to achieve socialism through organization of a socialist party and the organization of trade unions. McGuire founded and edited a paper known as The Toiler, toured the United States lecturing for the party, and worked as a carpenter during the 1870s.

== Work ==
McGuire believed that political organizing held more promise for advancing workers' rights than unionism did during this decade. He became deeply involved in the campaign for the eight-hour day and a member of the Greenback Labor Party after moving in 1878 to St. Louis, Missouri, where he continued to work as a carpenter and joined the Knights of Labor. He led a successful strike of carpenters in St. Louis for the eight-hour day.

With the collapse of the Greenback Labor Party, he became more committed to unionism. As a member of the Knights of Labor who disagreed with some of the labor policies of the Knights of Labor, he supported the creation of a separate labor federation. He attended one of the preliminary meetings that led to the organization of the Federation of Organized Trades and Labor Unions in 1881. McGuire served as Vice-President of the Federation and its successor, the American Federation of Labor, for most of the following two decades.

In the same year that McGuire called for founding of a national labor federation, he helped organize the convention of various carpenters' unions that formed the United Brotherhood of Carpenters and Joiners of America on August 8, 1881. The organization had a number of goals: to improve carpenters and working conditions by protecting the craft from the incursions on their work made by new woodworking machinery that threatened to displace their work of making doors, sashes and other planed elements and to prevent the debasing of their craft by subcontracting, piece rates and other practices that divided the carpenter's work into smaller, less skilled functions. The Carpenters Union proposed to do this by controlling the supply of labor, organizing the entire industry and excluding non-union contractors from the market.

In order to do that, the union first had to either absorb or eliminate rival unions in the industry. This process took two decades to accomplish, as other organizations, such as the United Order of American Carpenters and the Amalgamated Society of Carpenters and Joiners, were just as protective of their jurisdiction. McGuire negotiated reciprocal arrangements with some unions, such as the Amalgamated Society, then later negotiated to absorb it within the Carpenters as a semi-autonomous entity within it. McGuire also negotiated jurisdictional agreements with other unions, such as the Shipwrights Union and the Wood Workers, with competing claims to work that the Carpenters claimed.

McGuire had been not only the only leader that the union had for its first twenty years, but nearly the entire organization for a good part of that time, paying union expenses out of his own pocket. That, along with his conciliatory attitude toward rival unions, gave rise to widespread opposition to his administration at the beginning of the twentieth century. His opponents demanded an audit of the union's records, which showed that approximately ten thousand dollars could not be accounted for. McGuire was arrested for embezzlement in 1901 and voted out of office in 1902.

At the 1902 Carpenters' convention, the last he attended, he addressed the delegates:

[A] man wears out like a piece of machinery. . . . I am not lost entirely in this world but I have had enough to wreck me physically, destroy me mentally.

McGuire died four years later, his death hastened by alcoholism. He is buried in Arlington Cemetery in Pennsauken Township, New Jersey.

== Honors ==
In 2014, McGuire was inducted into the New Jersey Hall of Fame.

In August 2021, a group of rank and file union carpenters in Western Washington organized the Peter J. McGuire Group to push for a better contract and more transparency from the union leadership.

== United We build Commemorative book ==
In September 1985, a commemoration book, authored by Sharon L. Rogan and entitled United We Build:The Legacy of 100 years, was printed reviewing the history of labor in New Jersey from 1881-1981. The following labor unions are credited with being organized by Peter J. Mcguire and Arthur A. Quinn before 1900 in NJ and active at the time of publication:

- Local 119 Newark (1885)
- Local 155 Plainfield (1886)
- Local 167 Elizabeth (1886)
- Local 399 Philipsburg (1888)
- Local 265 Hackensack (1891)
- Local 750 Asbury Park (1891)
- Local 306 Newark (1895)
- Local 349 Newark (1895)
- Local 429 Newark/Montclair (1895)
- Local 467 Hoboken (1895)
- Local 612 Union Hill (1895)
- Local 57 Irvington (1896)
- Local 65 Perth Amboy (1896)
- Local 299 Union City (1899)
- Local 118 Jersey City (1899)
- Local 330 New Orange/Roselle Park (1899)
- Local 383 Bayonne (1899)

Trade union offices
Preceded by New position	General Secretary-Treasurer of the United Brotherhood of Carpenters and Joiners of America; August 8, 1881-1901	Succeeded by Frank Duffy
Preceded by New position	Secretary of the American Federation of Labor; 1886–1889	Succeeded by Chris Evans
Preceded by William Martin	Second Vice-President of the American Federation of Labor; 1889–1890	Succeeded by William A. Carney
Preceded by William Martin	First Vice-President of the American Federation of Labor; 1890–1900	Succeeded by James Duncan
Preceded by New position	American Federation of Labor delegate to the Trades Union Congress; 1895; With: Samuel Gompers	Succeeded by Jeremiah Sullivan; Adolph Strasser
