= Arthur A. Quinn =

American labor union leader (1866–1957)

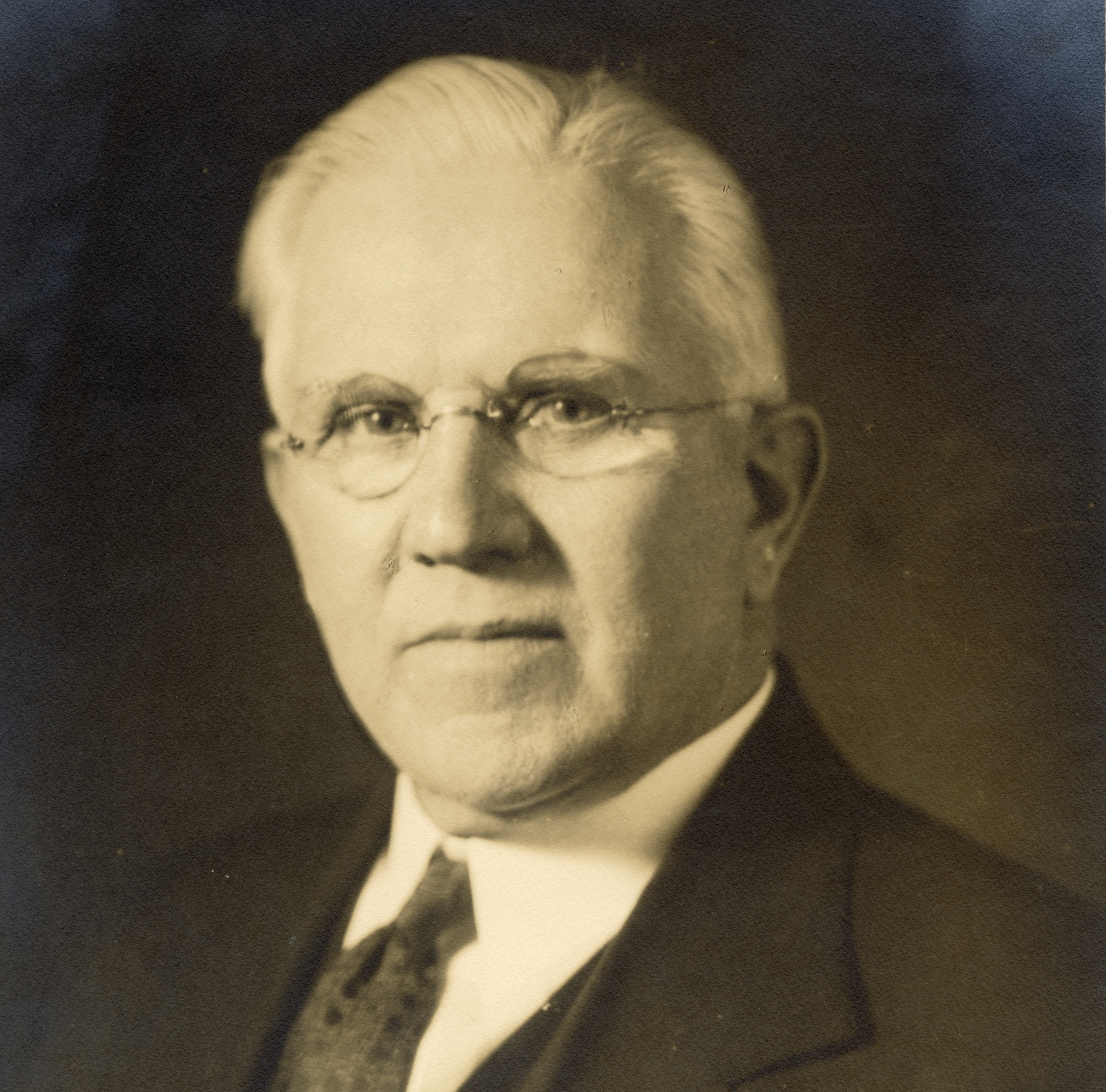

President of the New Jersey Federation of Labor
- In office 1913–1933
- Preceded by: Cornelius Ford
- Succeeded by: Thomas Eames

Member of the New Jersey Senate
- In office 1929–1933
- Preceded by: Morgan Foster Larson
- Succeeded by: John Toolan

Member of the New Jersey General Assembly
- In office 1913–1915

Comptroller of the Customs of the Port of New York & New Jersey
- In office 1933–1951

President of Union National Bank, Newark NJ
- In office 1925–1946
- Succeeded by: Vincent J. Murphy

Personal details
- Born: May 13, 1866 Philadelphia, Pennsylvania, U.S.
- Died: February 2, 1957 (aged 90) Edison, New Jersey, U.S.
- Party: Democratic
- Spouse: Jeanette Cecelia Larkin (m. 1890)
- Children: 4
- Occupation: Labor Leader; Politician; Banker
- Known for: Labor Pioneer; President, New Jersey Federation of Labor; Politician; Banker
- Nickname(s): "Fair and Square"

Arthur Augustine Quinn (May 13, 1866 – February 2, 1957) was an American labor union pioneer, leader, politician, and banker. He served as General Organizer for the United Brotherhood of Carpenters and Joiners of America and Canada from 1902 to 1906 and second vice president from 1906 to 1908. He served as the New Jersey State President of the American Federation of Labor from 1913 to 1933 and Comptroller of the Customs of the Port of New York and New Jersey from 1933 to 1951. A member of the Democratic Party, Quinn served in the New Jersey General Assembly from 1913 to 1915 and in the New Jersey Senate from 1929 to 1933.

== Early life ==
Arthur Augustine Quinn was born on May 13, 1866, in Ward 7 Philadelphia, to Jane (Mcdonnell) and Terrence T. Quinn. One of nine children, the family moved to Perth Amboy, New Jersey, in 1874. Terrence's family originated from County Tyrone in Ireland. They immigrated through the port of Philadelphia in 1854. Jane (Jeanette) McDonnell originated from Kilglass in County Sligo in Ireland. She immigrated with her father Alexander first through Montreal and later Philadelphia. Terrence served along with his brother in the 24th Regiment Pennsylvania Volunteers during the civil war.

Terrence is listed in a February 5, 1887 article as a regional leader and a coal trimmer where he explains the injurious conditions caused by working with the coal for both him as his coworkers. At the time, he notes that half his pay went to health treatments and the remainder to his family. Terrence is listed in the article as one of the original remaining Lehigh valley coal trimmers to settle in Perth Amboy. Terrence would die September 29, 1903 from asthma (emphysema), which was a directly caused by the conditions noted in the article.

The conditions described in the article directly contributed to his death from asthma (emphysema) on September 29, 1903.

Arthur's first job was as a "Printer's Devil" at age 15, working in a printing plant rolling ink over type. During school and vacations he worked at a terracotta plant. He soon discovered that the printing trade was too conservative and without excitement. Watching men at what was then considered thrilling and exciting height, building five and six story structures attracted him so he hired himself as a carpenter's apprentice in 1885 for $16 per month. After working at the trade for about a year, he and a number of other apprentices and journeymen unsuccessfully attempted to form a union in 1886 and 1890, during which he became a journeyman. In 1896, after wages had fallen from a high of 25 cents an hour to a low of 17.5 cents an hour, the Local 65 carpenter union in Perth Amboy was formed. "We were no sooner organized than we were referred to as young anarchists" so in order to create a more favorable impression in the public eye, we succeeded in getting an older and more established man, a foreman, to join the union, and it was he, William Bath, who was selected as first president"

== Early Organizing, United Brotherhood of Carpenters, American Federation of Labor ==
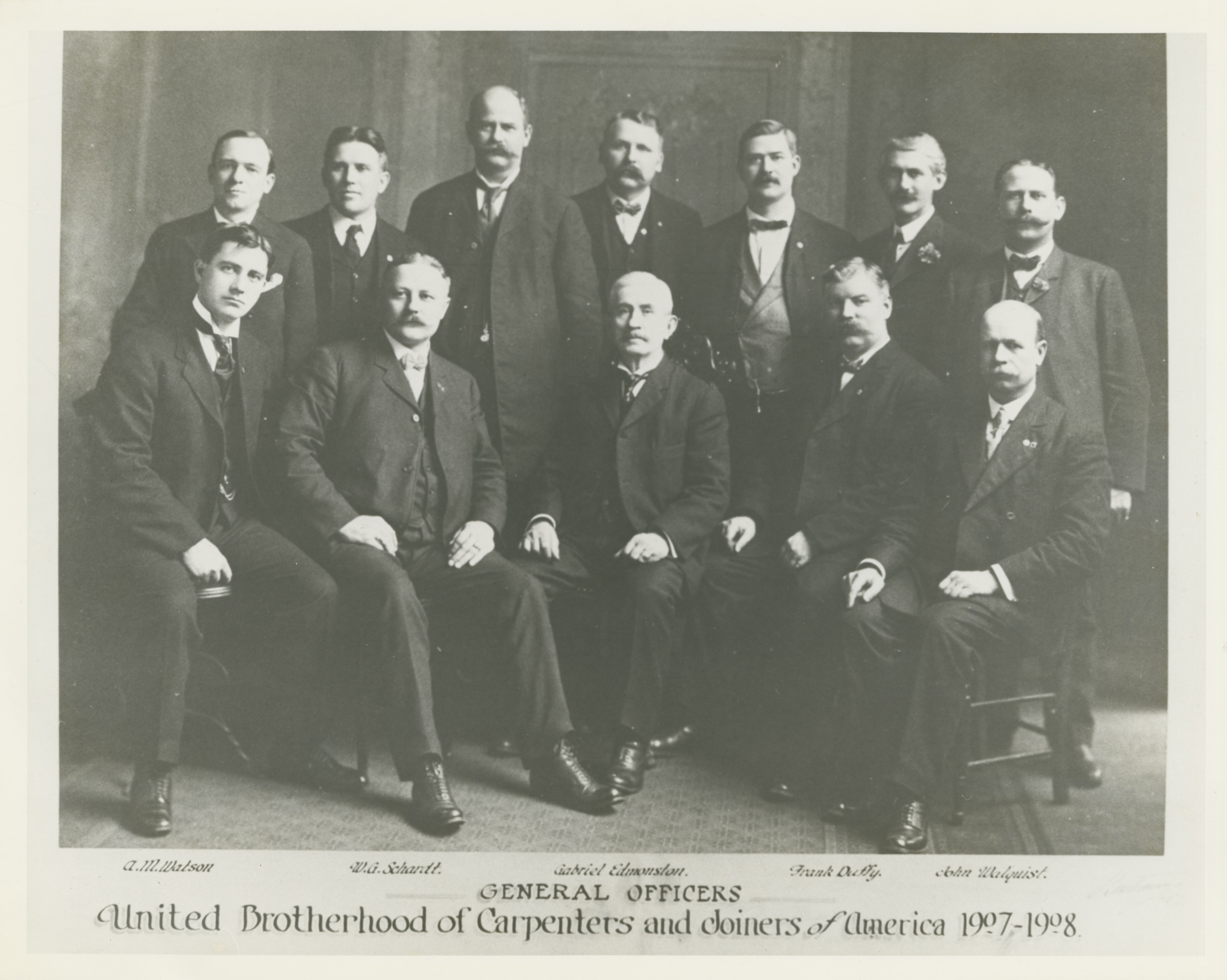
General Officers of the United Brotherhood of Carpenters and Joiners of America, 1907–08. Top row, from left: T.M. Guerin, Arthur A. Quinn, William Huber, D.A. Post, Thomas Neale, R.E.L. Connolly, P.H. McCarthy. Bottom row, from left: A.M. Watson, W.G. Schardt, Gabriel Edmonston, Frank Duffy, John Walquist.

Quinn began his career as a carpenter before taking up leadership roles in organized labor in New Jersey. As was with Peter J. McgGuire, he had only a 3rd grade education before beginning his trade with the majority of his education coming through experience and very heavy reading. In 1896, Quinn helped found the Local 65 chapter of the United Brotherhood of Carpenters and Joiners of America (UBC), the second union organized in Perth Amboy. He began as a General Organizer for the national union in 1902-1906 and in this role he was #3 position in the organization with his primary responsibility forming unions anywhere the UBC operated.

After Peter J. McGuire's death in 1906, Quinn noted in his monthly report that he was one of only 4 people that attended the funeral and that "he was buried in a field with no marker". He initiated the effort to collect the funds to properly bury Peter and install the original marker. The columns and statue in the present day plot were added 50 years later.

Quinn was elevated to second general vice president of the UBC in 1906 and the first general vice president in 1908. In 1912 an constitutional amendment was adopted by the United Brotherhood of Carpenters requiring the first vice presidents residence be in Indianapolis. Arthur, who had been elected to the role, noted that he was not up to the task upon his arrival "due to his poor eyesight". This may have been an excuse for his unwillingness to leave New Jersey where he had great influence on the labor movement. According to some accounts he “did not relish the idea of abandoning his Bergen and Hudson County haunts to his [political] enemies in favor of a $1,600 a year job in the Mid West”. Consequently, William L. Hutchenson became first vice president while Quinn assumed the role of second vice president, which permitted him to remain in NJ. A year later the President of the Carpenters died and William Hutchenson instead of Arthur A. Quinn stepped into the job. Quinn resigned his leadership role at the United Brotherhood of Carpenters in 1915 and was appointed General National Representative.

In 1904 Quinn worked with the State Building Trade Council in having law enacted to create the State Department of Labor. The Northeast Carpenters council notes on their website that he was instrumental in merging the Amalgamated Carpenters in North Jersey to the UBC. In 1911, as a private citizen he successfully lobbied for the creation of New Jersey's original workman's compensation act.

"Up until then," Quinn declared, "the only recourse the workingman or his family had was to sue his employer, which, for persons in those circumstances, was almost a hopeless task."

Beginning in 1913, Arthur served for 20 years as the president of the New Jersey Federation of Labor (a state branch of the American Federation of Labor) replacing Cornelius Ford. During his two decades at the helm, Quinn supported the creation of a fund for “old age relief,” the dissolution of sweat shops, investigating the wages paid to women and children, the creation of unemployment insurance, and creating a five-day work week with a six-hour work day. He was an outspoken critic of socialism.

== Politics ==
In addition to his work as a state labor leader, Quinn entered politics in 1913 when he was elected to the New Jersey General Assembly to represent Middlesex County. In 1915, he ran for State Senator but was defeated by W. Edwin Florance by approximately 1000 votes. There had been strong opposition from the Mercer County trade unionists to him in the lead up to the vote. In 1918, Quinn unsuccessfully ran for State Senate against Thomas Brown and was noted as an anti establishment candidate.

Arthur is considered by many to be the father of the 8 hour day for New Jersey's state, county, and municipal workers. He was an outspoken critic of socialism. Quinn passed the bill in 1913 to establish the town of Middlesex in Middlesex County.

During World War I, he was selected by Woodrow Wilson to chair the Selective Service committee. Quinn also "supervised the construction of a town for the housing of ship workers and ..the (assembling) of ready-cut houses to be shipped to war-torn France". After state senator Morgan Foster Larson resigned his position in 1929 to become governor of New Jersey, Quinn became the Democratic nominee to replace him in a special election. He defeated Republican nominee Russell Watson in the November election by more than 3,000 votes, thanks in part to the support from Jersey City mayor Frank Hague. Quinn ran for a full three-year term during the following election cycle, which he won more by more than 11,000 votes over Assemblyman Irving Demarest. He became the minority whip of the New Jersey Senate in 1933. As a state senator, Quinn served on the Committee on Banks and Insurance, and was active in the Advisory Committee on Employment Problems. He introduced the state's first unemployment compensation bill in 1933, though it was defeated. He was nominated for Governor by the State Federation of Labor in 1933. Prior to the 1934 New Jersey gubernatorial election, he was unanimously endorsed by the New Jersey Federation of Labor to be the Democratic nominee for governor.

In 1933, Quinn resigned his seat in the senate and retired from his post as state AFL president to become the Comptroller of the Port of New York after being nominated by President Franklin D. Roosevelt. He was confirmed for the position on June 3, 1933 and sworn into office on June 23, 1933. Quinn would remain in this role for 18 years until he retired from public service in 1951. It is of interest that President Harry S Truman signed Executive Order 10215 on February 16, 1951, exempting Arthur A from mandatory retirement until June 30, 1951. In 1937, he was Chairman of the New Jersey State Housing Authority.

== Union National Bank ==
Quinn was a founding member and served as President of the Labor National Bank of Newark, a labor bank which opened in February 1925. Renamed as Union National Bank in 1929, it has the distinction of being the only labor bank to survive the Great Depression in the Northeast US. The surviving banks were surveyed after the Great Depression and Quinn credited its survival to Federal Savings Bonds. He stepped down as president in 1946 when it consolidated with Broad National Bank in Newark, but remained serving at the bank on the board of directors until 1954.

== Personal life ==
Quinn married Jeanette Cecelia Larkin on November 29, 1890, at St Mary's Church in Perth Amboy, NJ. They had four children: Arthur A. Jr., Agnes Elizabeth, Jane (1897–1901), and Terrence Joseph "Teddy." The family lived in the Sewaren section of Woodbridge Township, New Jersey.

Quinn was presented a key to the city by Atlantic City mayor Anthony M. Ruffu Jr.

Quinn died on February 2, 1957, in Roosevelt Hospital in Edison, New Jersey. David T. Wilentz was a pallbearer at his funeral. Cause of death was listed as cancer. He is buried at St Mary's Cemetery in Perth Amboy, NJ.

He is a grandfather of 2017 New Jersey State Assembly candidate Robert A. Quinn.

Arthur A's brother John J Quinn was a banker and Executive Vice President of Raritan Trust Company of Perth Amboy. John J was appointed to the position of Postmaster of Perth Amboy by Franklin D. Roosevelt in 1933.

His personal papers are held at The Monsignor Noe Field Archives and Special Collections Center at Seton Hall University in South Orange, New Jersey.

== United We Build commemoration book ==
In September 1985, a commemoration book, authored by Sharon L. Rogan and entitled United We Build:The Legacy of 100 years, was printed reviewing the history of labor in New Jersey from 1881 to 1981. The following labor unions are credited with being organized by Peter J. Mcguire and Arthur A. Quinn before 1900 in NJ and active at the time of publication:

- Local 119 Newark (1885)
- Local 155 Plainfield (1886)
- Local 167 Elizabeth (1886)
- Local 399 Philipsburg (1888)
- Local 265 Hackensack (1891)
- Local 750 Asbury Park (1891)
- Local 306 Newark (1895)
- Local 349 Newark (1895)
- Local 429 Newark/Montclair (1895)
- Local 467 Hoboken (1895)
- Local 612 Union Hill (1895)
- Local 57 Irvington (1896)
- Local 65 Perth Amboy (1896)
- Local 299 Union City (1899)
- Local 118 Jersey City (1899)
- Local 330 New Orange/Roselle Park (1899)
- Local 383 Bayonne (1899)
