= Tile, Marble, Terrazzo, Finishers', Shopworkers' and Granite Cutters' International Union =

North American trade union (1901–1988)

- Abbreviation: TMT
- Merged into: United Brotherhood of Carpenters and Joiners of America, November 11, 1988
- Formation: 1901, Detroit, Michigan, United States
- Formerly called: International Association of Marble Workers (1901); International Association of Marble, Slate and Stone Polishers, Rubbers and Sawyers, Tile and Marble Setters' Helpers and Terrazzo Helpers (1931); Tile, Marble, Terrazzo, Finishers and Shopmen International Union (1976)

The Tile, Marble, Terrazzo, Finishers', Shopworkers' and Granite Cutters' International Union (TMT) was a labor union representing construction workers who used marble and similar decorative materials, in the United States and Canada.

== History ==
The union was founded in 1901 as the International Association of Marble Workers in Detroit, United States. On January 11, 1902, it was chartered by the American Federation of Labor. By 1925, it had 4,500 members, and had expanded its jurisdiction beyond marble workers, to include tile, marble and terazzo setters' helpers, against the opposition of the International Hod Carriers' and Building Laborers' Union.

The union's name was gradually lengthened, until in 1931, it became the International Association of Marble, Slate and Stone Polishers, Rubbers and Sawyers, Tile and Marble Setters' Helpers and Terrazzo Helpers. Under this name, it affiliated to the new AFL-CIO in 1955, and by 1957, it had 8,200 members.

In 1976, the union became the Tile, Marble, Terrazzo, Finishers and Shopmen International Union, and in 1980, it absorbed the Granite Cutters' International Association of America. It adopted its final name, and its membership reached 9,300. On November 11, 1988, it merged into the United Brotherhood of Carpenters and Joiners of America.

== Presidents ==
Name	Term
William J. Grant	
Stephen C. Hogan	1910s
James McGrane	1920s
William McCarthy	1920s
William Peitler	c.1960
Wylie Lawhead	c.1970
Pascal Di James	1975
