= Josiah B. Dyer =

British-born American labor union leader

Josiah Bennett Dyer (January 5, 1843 – March 12, 1900) was a British-born American labor union leader.

Born in Luxulyan in Cornwall, England, Dyer completed an apprenticeship as a stonecutter, and joined the Operative Society of Masons. His brother, J. Edward Dyer, later became general secretary of that union.

Dyer worked in Penryn for eight years before, in 1871, emigrating to the United States, and working in various locations in Massachusetts.

Dyer founded an early branch of the Knights of Labor in Boston. He also joined the Granite Cutters' International Union, and in 1877 he organized a new branch in Graniteville, Massachusetts. The following year, he was elected as secretary of that union. As the most prominent figure in the union, he was a leading personality in the Federation of Organized Trades and Labor Unions, and he was one of five signatories to the call for unions to attend the conference which reorganized it as the American Federation of Labor.

Dyer served as secretary of the union until 1895, moving with its headquarters to various locations, including Philadelphia. He died in 1900 and was buried in Concord, New Hampshire.

Trade union offices
Preceded by Thompson H. Murch	Secretary of the Granite Cutters' International Union; 1878–1895	Succeeded by James Duncan
