= William A. Carney =

William A. Carney (1860–1904) was a British-born American trade unionist.

Born in England, Carney emigrated to the United States in about 1884, settling in Pittsburgh. There, he worked in an iron mill as a rougher. He joined the Amalgamated Association of Iron and Steel Workers, and towards the end of the decade was corresponding secretary of his local union.

In 1890, Carney was elected as a vice-president of the Iron and Steel Workers, covering the union's district 1. He was also elected as the second vice-president of the American Federation of Labor (AFL). In 1891, he was re-elected by only a minority of delegates. Upon realizing that this was contrary to the federation's rules, he resigned, but was immediately re-elected, this time unanimously.

He came to greater prominence in 1892, as a leader of the Homestead strike, giving speeches and chairing numerous meetings. Part of the annual AFL convention was set aside to discussing the strike, at which Carney and William Weihe attracted the most attention.

Carney stood down as a vice-president of the AFL in 1893. In 1895, he left his Iron and Steel Workers post, to become a full-time AFL organizer for Pennsylvania and West Virginia. In 1898, he instead became a factory inspector.

Trade union offices
| Preceded by Peter J. McGuire | Second Vice-President of the American Federation of Labor; 1890–1893 | Succeeded by Charles L. Drummond |
