= Daniel McLaughlin (unionist) =

American labor unionist (1831–1901)

Daniel McLaughlin (1831 – 1901) was a Scottish-born American labor unionist.

Born in Lanarkshire, in Scotland, to an Irish family, McLaughlin worked as a coal miner in Maryhill from the age of nine. He took part in his first strike in 1842, and another in 1847. During this second action, he met Alexander Macdonald, and he helped Macdonald win election in a local miners' lodge. McLaughlin was elected as both secretary and president of the Maryhill miners' lodge, and due to his union activity, found it increasingly difficult to secure work as a miner.

McLaughlin worked to secure Alexander Macdonald's 1865 election as secretary of the Scottish Miners' Union. In 1869, he emigrated to the United States, staying briefly in Boston, then settling in Braidwood, Illinois, a town with many Scottish miners, which Macdonald had visited two years earlier. There, he joined the local miners' union, through which he helped to secure a pay increase in 1872.

In 1873, McLaughlin worked with John James, another Braidwood-based miner, to establish the Miners' National Association, with the Braidwood union affiliating. The new union was based on the British Miners' National Union, which emphasized negotiation over industrial action. However, in 1874, McLaughlin back a strike in Braidwood, after the Chicago, Wilmington and Vermillion Coal Company locked out workers. The strike was successful, with the company agreeing to negotiate with the union. However, in 1877, the company imposed wages cuts and introduced contracts which barred workers from joining a union. McLaughlin backed another strike, but this was defeated after nine months, when the state governor sent the milita to the town. McLaughlin was then blacklisted from the local mines.

Also in 1877, McLaughlin was elected as Mayor of Braidwood, representing the Greenback Party. He served a two-year term, and another one from 1881 to 1883. Around this time, he was active in the Knights of Labor, serving on its general board from 1880 until 1881.

Coal miners' unions were weak in the early 1880s, and there were several wage cuts. In 1885, McLaughlin established two new unions: the Coal Miners' Benevolent and Protective Association of Illinois, of which he was president until 1888; and the National Federation of Miners and Mine Laborers, of which he was treasurer until 1888. He argued that there should be annual conferences of mine owners and the unions, to agree pay scales.

In 1886, McLaughlin was elected to the Illinois House of Representatives, representing the Republican Party. He was re-elected in 1888, serving until 1890. He remained active in trade unionism, becoming the first person to serve as first vice-president of the American Federation of Labor, and in 1888 being a founder of the National Progressive Union of Miners and Mine Laborers.

In about 1890, McLaughlin moved to Starkville, Colorado, to take a job as a mine superintendent.

Trade union offices
| Preceded by George Harris | First Vice-President of the American Federation of Labor; 1887–1889 | Succeeded by William Martin |
