= Gabriel Edmonston =

American unionist and carpenter

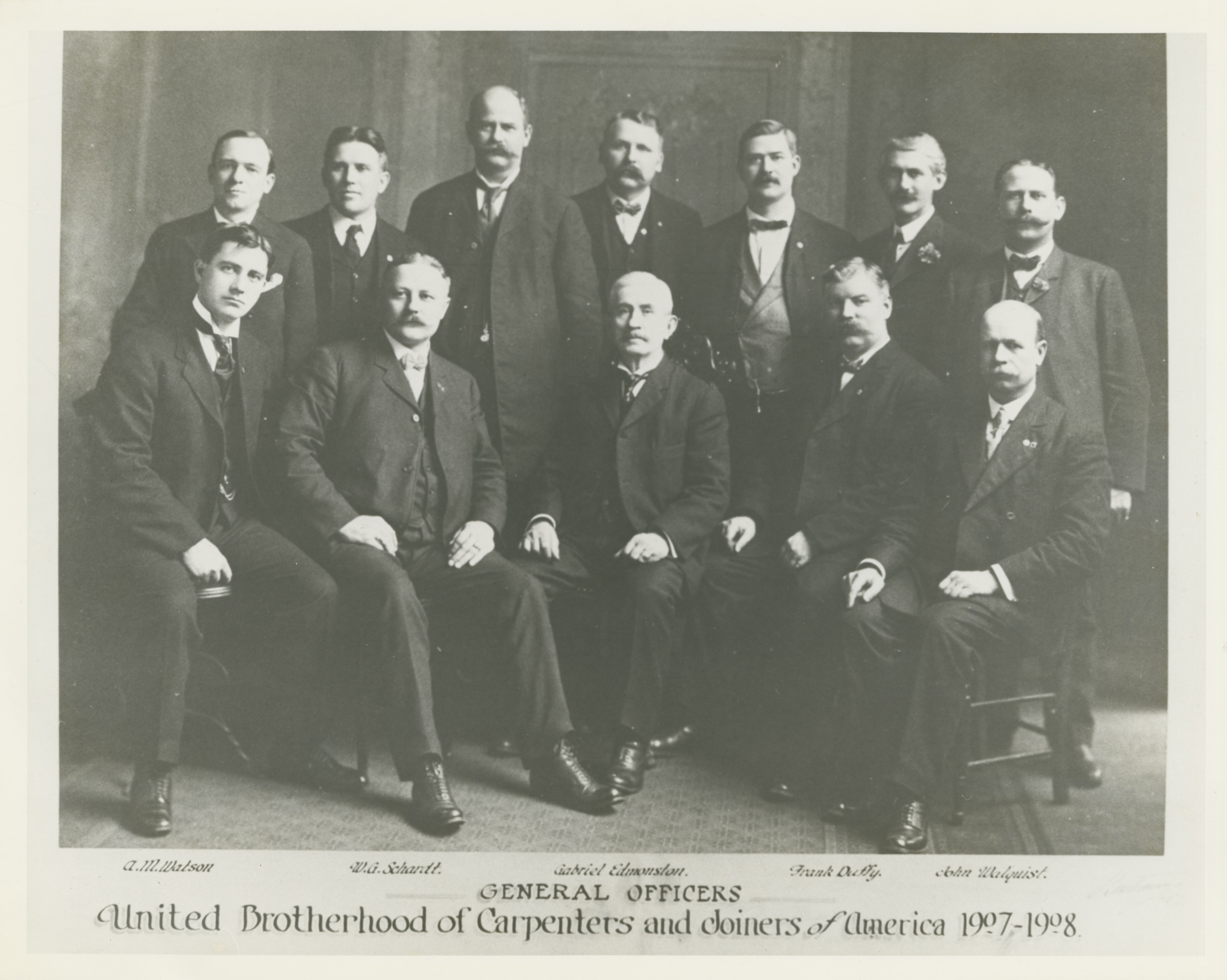
General Officers of the United Brotherhood of Carpenters and Joiners of America, 1907-08. Top row, from left: T.M. Guerin, Arthur A. Quinn, William Huber, D.A. Post, Thomas Neale, R.E.L. Connolly, P.H. McCarthy. Bottom row, from left: A.M. Watson, W.G. Schardt, Gabriel Edmonston, Frank Duffy, John Walquist.

Gabriel Edmonston (March 29, 1839 – May 16, 1918) was an American labor unionist and carpenter.

Born in Washington, D.C., Edmonston trained as a carpenter. During the American Civil War, he served in the Confederate Army, in the First Corps, Army of Northern Virginia, being taken prisoner on four occasions, and wounded twice.

After the war, Edmonston returned to Washington. He came to believe that carpenters needed to form labor unions in order to improve their pay and working conditions, and in 1881, he formed a local union. He argued that it should admit all carpenters, regardless of ethnicity, nationality or religion. Later in the year, he played a role in founding the United Brotherhood of Carpenters, becoming its first president.

In 1881/1882, Edmonston served as president of the UBC. The UBC affiliated to the Federation of Organized Trades and Labor Unions, and Edmonston served as its secretary in 1884/1885. While in office, he was the first to propose an eight hour day. The federation transformed into the American Federation of Labor, with Edmonston becoming its first treasurer, serving until 1889, when he stood down to devote his time to his local union in Washington. Around this time, he also served as official carpenter to the United States House of Representatives.

Trade union offices
Preceded by New position	President of the United Brotherhood of Carpenters; 1881–1882	Succeeded by John D. Allen
Preceded by Charles F. Burgman	Second Vice-President of the Federation of Organized Trades and Labor Unions; 1882–1884	Succeeded by Richard Powers
Preceded by Frank Keyes Foster	Secretary of the Federation of Organized Trades and Labor Unions; 1884–1885	Succeeded by William H. Foster
Preceded by Robert Howard	Treasurer of the Federation of Organized Trades and Labor Unions; 1885–1886	Succeeded by Federation reorganized
Preceded by Federation reorganized	Treasurer of the American Federation of Labor; 1886–1889	Succeeded by John Brown Lennon
