= William Martin (unionist) =

William Martin (January 7, 1845 – January 11, 1923) was a Scottish-born American labor union leader.

Born in Calderbank, in Scotland, Martin emigrated to the United States in 1868, and in 1870, settled in Pittsburgh. He joined the Iron and Steel Roll Hands' Union, and later became secretary of its lodge in Columbus, Ohio. He was later a founder member of the Amalgamated Association of Iron and Steel Workers, and in 1878 was elected as its secretary. In 1886, he was additionally elected as a vice-president of the American Federation of Labor, becoming first vice-president in 1889.

In 1889, Martin petitioned Benjamin Harrison for the office of Commissioner of Labor Statistics, with support from several senators and also Andrew Carnegie. He was not granted the post, but in 1890, he left his labor union posts, and became Chief of the Bureau of Labor at the Carnegie Steel Company. In 1893, he became a co-owner of Eureka Lubricants, and sole owner in 1896, focusing his time on selling the company's products. However, the business closed in 1898.

In 1897, Martin unsuccessfully petitioned for the post of Commissioner of Immigration at Ellis Island. He instead became an insurance salesman, and later, as a night manager at Reymer and Brothers, a local department store. He died in 1923.

Trade union offices
Preceded by Joseph Bishop as president and secretary	Secretary of the Amalgamated Association of Iron and Steel Workers; 1878–1890	Succeeded by Stephen Madden
Preceded by James W. Smith	Second Vice-President of the American Federation of Labor; 1887–1889	Succeeded by Peter J. McGuire
Preceded by Daniel McLaughlin	First Vice-President of the American Federation of Labor; 1889–1890	Succeeded by Peter J. McGuire
