= Mark Erlich =

American union official, writer, and construction industry expert

Mark Erlich (born October 25, 1949) is an American writer and retired labor union leader. From 2005 to 2017, he was the Executive Secretary-Treasurer of the New England Regional Council of Carpenters. An official of the United Brotherhood of Carpenters, one the largest affiliates of North America's Building Trades Unions, he has written extensively about the evolution of the construction industry in the United States as well as the political history of prevailing wage laws.

Since 2017, he taught at the Harvard Trade Union Program, today the Center for Labor and a Just Economy.

== Career as union organizer and officer ==
Erlich was field director for the 1988 No on 2 campaign against a ballot initiative that would have repealed the prevailing wage law in Massachusetts. In 1992, he was elected Business Manager of Local 40 of the Carpenters Union. Under Erlich's leadership, Local 40 came to lead the Carpenters' political and organizing efforts in New England. Construction industry users who came under union contract during Erlich's leadership of Local 40 include MIT, Harvard, as well as industrial companies such as Biogen.

When the Carpenters Union restructured into regional councils, Erlich served as Organizing Director of the New England Regional Council of Carpenters (NERCC) from 1997 to 2002. In 2005, he was elected as Executive Secretary-Treasurer (EST) of NERCC, overseeing the 25,000 member organization. During his tenure, the New England Regional Council was unique among North Atlantic States in preventing the spread of the open shop, which spread to New York City during the Great Recession.

As Executive Secretary-Treasurer, Erlich chaired the New England Regional Council’s Training Fund as well as its Health, Pension, and Annuity Funds.

Erlich served on numerous boards and advisory panels, including appointments by Boston mayors and Massachusetts governors to the Boston Zoning Board of Appeals, Economic Development Planning Council, the Board of the Massachusetts Convention Center Authority, the Federal Reserve Bank of Boston board, and the board of MassINC. He was also Vice-President of the Massachusetts AFL-CIO Executive Board and a member of the Massachusetts Building Trades Council Executive Board.

After Erlich's retirement, UBC president Douglas McCarron directed that "the name of the New England Regional Council of Carpenters be changed to the North Atlantic States Regional Council of Carpenters." The current EST of the North Atlantic States Regional Council of Carpenters is Joseph Byrne.

== Writing and teaching ==
In 1983, Erlich was appointed director of the Massachusetts Carpenters History Project with a grant from the Massachusetts Foundation for Humanities and Public Policy, the state council of the National Endowment for the Humanities. In 1986, Temple University Press published With Our Hands: The Story of the Carpenters in Massachusetts, a history of the carpentry trade in Massachusetts since the 19th century, which Erlich authored on the basis of the research conducted by the Massachusetts Carpenters History Project.

Erlich's other books include Labor at the ballot box: the Massachusetts prevailing wage campaign of 1988 (1990) and The Way We Build (2023).

Since retiring from the union in 2017, Erlich has been a Wertheim Fellow at the Center for Labor & a Just Economy at Harvard Law School. Erlich has taught labor history at institutions including the Harvard Trade Union Program.

== Family ==
Erlich's grandfather was Henryk Ehrlich, a leader of the General Jewish Labor Bund in Poland executed by the Soviet Union in 1941. Henryk was survived by his wife Sophia Dubnova and their children, including Victor and Alexander Erlich. Alexander Erlich was a professor of economics at Columbia University and the author of the definitive English-language study of pre-Stalin Soviet economic policy.

== Publications ==
=== Books ===
- The Way We Build: Restoring Dignity to Construction Work. University of Illinois Press, 2023. ISBN 978-0252087332
- Labor at the Ballot Box: The Massachusetts Prevailing Wage Campaign of 1988. Temple University Press, 1990. ISBN 978-0877227274
- With Our Hands: The Story of Carpenters in Massachusetts. Temple University Press, 1986 ISBN 978-0877224334
