= Granite Cutters' International Association =

GCIA
- Granite Cutters' International Association of America
- Merged into: Tile, Marble, Terrazzo, Finishers', Shopworkers' and Granite Cutters' International Union
- Founded: 1877
- Dissolved: 1980
- Location: United States, Canada
- Affiliations: American Federation of Labor

The Granite Cutters' International Association of America (GCIA) was a trade union representing granite cutters in the United States and Canada.

== History ==
The union was founded in March 1877 near Rockland, Maine, USA. Its official publication was the Granite Cutters’ Journal. It was among the founding organizations of the American Federation of Labor.

It was founded as the Granite Cutters' National Union and later Granite Cutters' International Union of the United States and the British Provinces of America before taking its final name in 1905. Jobs for skilled granite cutters dwindled in the 1960s and the union eventually merged into the Tile, Marble, Terrazzo, Finishers', Shopworkers' and Granite Cutters' International Union.

== Leaders ==
The leader of the union was initially the secretary; from 1905 the secretary-treasurer; and from 1912, the president.

1877: Thompson H. Murch
1878: Josiah B. Dyer
1895: James Duncan
1923: Samuel Squibb
1935: Lawrence Foley
1951: Costanzo Pagnano
1967: Joseph P. Ricciarelli
