= United Order of American Carpenters =

Former trade union of the United States

- Merged into: United Brotherhood of Carpenters and Joiners of America
- Dissolved: 1888
- Location: United States of America

The United Order of American Carpenters and Joiners was a trade union in the United States. It represented carpenters in the New York City area, making it one of the largest carpenters' unions in the U.S. in the 1880s. It merged with the Brotherhood of Carpenters in 1888 to form the United Brotherhood of Carpenters and Joiners of America.
