= Thompson H. Murch =

American politician (1838–1886)

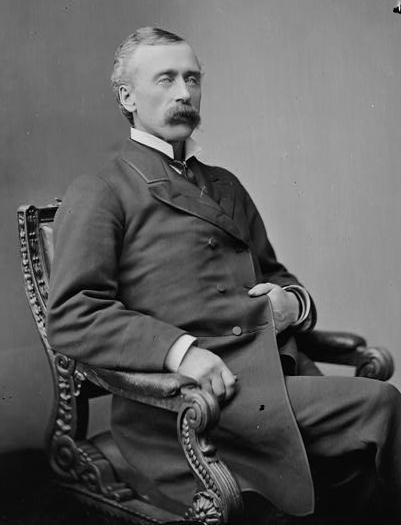

Member of the U.S. House of Representatives from Maine's 5th district
- In office March 4, 1879 – March 3, 1883
- Preceded by: Eugene Hale
- Succeeded by: District abolished

Personal details
- Born: Thompson Henry Murch; March 29, 1838 Hampden, Maine, US
- Died: December 15, 1886 (aged 48) Danvers, Massachusetts, US
- Party: Greenback
- Profession: Politician, Stonecutter, Editor, Publisher, Merchant

Thompson Henry Murch (March 28, 1838 – December 15, 1886) was a nineteenth-century politician, stonecutter, editor, publisher and merchant from Maine. He was among the first trade unionists elected to the United States Congress.

== Life and career ==
Murch was born in Hampden, Maine, the son of Mary and Thompson Henry Murch. Murch attended common schools as a child and spent his early life at sea. His father was a sea-captain who died when Murch was an infant. Murch learned the trade of stonecutting and engaged in that occupation for eighteen years, living in a rented house on Dix Island, the site of a major granite quarry. He became editor and publisher of the Granite Cutters' International Journal in 1877 and was secretary of the Granite Cutters' International Association of America in 1877 and 1878.

Murch was elected a Greenbacker to the United States House of Representatives in 1878, serving from 1879 to 1883. Murch's election, along with fellow Greenback candidate George W. Ladd from nearby Bangor, greatly embarrassed the state and national Republican establishments, who'd come to consider Maine safe for the party. Murch was attacked in the New York Times and other papers as "the Communist candidate" as well as "Murch, the stonecutter". A front-page New York Times article caricatured him as "an ignorant stone-cutter who was never heard of until a few months ago, a Communist, a demagogue of the lowest type".

Other sources described Murch as honest, decent, and a devoted family man. The Reading (Penn) Eagle suggested that even thousands of Republicans supported Murch as "the man who broke the Blaine, Hale, Hamlin Ring", referring to the three most prominent Republican politicians in Maine, one of whom (Hale) Murch had defeated.

After his defeat in the 1882 election, Murch engaged in mercantile pursuits until his death in Danvers, Massachusetts on December 15, 1886. He was interred in Hampden Cemetery in Hampden, Maine.

Trade union offices
| Preceded by Union founded | Secretary of the Granite Cutters' National Union; 1877–1878 | Succeeded by Josiah B. Dyer |
U.S. House of Representatives
| Preceded by Eugene Hale | Member of the U.S. House of Representatives from Maine's 5th congressional district March 4, 1879 – March 3, 1883 | Succeeded by District eliminated |
