= Journeymen Tailors Union =

Former trade union of the United States

- Merged into: Amalgamated Clothing Workers of America
- Founded: Before 1871, re-organized 1883
- Dissolved: 1935
- Location: United States, Canada
- Key people: John Brown Lennon, Eugene Brais
- Affiliations: American Federation of Labor

The Journeymen Tailors Union (JTU) was a trade union in the United States, with some local branches in Canada.

== History ==
=== Before 1890 ===
Forerunners to the organization included the Tailors Progressive Union of America (TPUA) in the mid-1800s, as well as assemblies organized by the Knights of Labor. Very important was the tension between custom tailors (specializing in work done to order, usually higher-grade) and shop tailors (ordinary sewing of clothes made ready to wear). Regardless, there was little to no significant and unified tailors' union or movement before the 1880s. By then, shop tailors had begun to build more sophisticated organizations, which were then joined by custom tailors, a move which was vocally supported by John Brown Lennon, the future general secretary of the Journeymen Tailors' Union. A critical concern was the scabbing of custom tailors on shop tailors and vice versa during strikes, which could only be prevented by a more unified form of organization.

John Brown Lennon became general secretary in 1886, a position he would hold until losing it to the Canadian socialist Eugene Brais in 1910.

By 1887, the Tailors' Progressive Union had adopted a union label to be affixed to clothing, which was recognized by the American Federation of Labor (AFL). The JTU followed with its own union label in 1891. The TPUA was considerably more integrated into the labour movement, being composed mostly of shop tailors, many of whom were outspoken socialists and saw a common cause with other workers more than the journeymen custom tailors did.

=== 1890s ===
After 1889, the TPUA had declined in importance and attempts were made by shop tailors to join the JTU, which were rebuffed. In response, some shop tailors and other ready-made clothing workers started the United Garment Workers of America (UGWA) in 1891 and the International Ladies' Garment Workers Union (ILGWU) in 1900. All three organizations were recognized by the AFL, causing significant tensions over jurisdiction. These clashes resulted largely in victory for the UGWA and diminished importance for the JTU, with the UGWA gaining jurisdiction over all non-custom-made clothing manufacture, with the JTU being limited to custom tailoring establishments, despite the wishes of its then-secretary, John Brown Lennon. In 1897, the JTU also lost jurisdiction over special-order custom tailoring to the UGWA and Custom Clothing Makers' Union or Special Order Clothing Makers' Union, whose AFL charter was denied.

=== After 1900 ===
After 1900, successive and nearly annual attempts to reform the organization, to extend its jurisdiction, and in 1905 to merge with the UGWA and form a Garment Workers' and Tailors' International Union, all failed by membership vote. At its convention in Buffalo in 1909, the JTU recognized the rise in custom factory tailoring at the expense of old-style merchant tailoring, and as a result it claimed jurisdiction over all custom tailoring, which was ineffectually enforced and never fully backed by the AFL. As a result, the JTU began to engage in "raiding" by attempting to organize workers claimed under the jurisdiction of the UGWA.

With Lennon's attempts to amalgamate the organization with the UGWA and ILGWU failed and Eugene Brais elected as secretary, the direction of the organization changed drastically, with the rising socialist wing taking de facto control and renaming the organization to the International Tailors' Industrial Union (TIUI), articulating their preference for industrial unionism over craft unionism and putting it at odds Samuel Gompers, the president of the AFL and a personal friend of John Brown Lennon, who accused the JTU/TIUI of violating AFL bylaws by changing its name without permission. By the early 1910s, the union was divided into three factions: "old party" (conservative craft unionists), "progressives" (industrial unionists), and "liberals", the latter of which advocated reform but retention of the trade union model. This was similar to other garment workers unions, which saw surging support for socialist and industrial unionist positions and within the UGWA, an embrace of class struggle politics. This reflected broad trends at the time which were exemplified by the rise of purely industrial unionist and anti-capitalist organizations such as the Industrial workers' of the World. In 1914, a faction of disaffected UGWA members led by Sidney Hillman split from the organization and joined the JTU/TIUI instead, which by December had passed a motion proposing to rename the organization the Amalgamated Clothing Workers of America (ACWA) in preparation for a merger with the Hillman faction. Also passed was a motion barring members from belonging in two unions of the same trade, a gambit to force the Hillman faction into the JTU/TIUI/ACWA camp. The merger was defeated by vote and further propositions returned the name to "Journeyman Tailors' Union of America", a move which led to congratulations from the leadership of the AFL.

During the 1910s, many laundry workers and dyers also left the union, forming the Laundry Workers' International Union. By 1926, the union had 9,200 members. In 1935, it merged into the ACWA.

== General secretaries ==
1885: Joseph Wilkinson
1887: John Brown Lennon
1910: Eugene J. Brais
1915: Thomas Sweeney
1927: Gustaf P. Soderberg
1933: William Reznicek
