= United Brotherhood of Carpenters and Joiners of America =

Labor union in North America

UBC
- United Brotherhood of Carpenters and Joiners of America
- Founded: 1881
- Location(s): United States & Canada
- Members: 445,870 (2016)
- Key people: Douglas J. McCarron, president
- Website: www.carpenters.org

The United Brotherhood of Carpenters and Joiners of America, often simply the United Brotherhood of Carpenters (UBC), was formed in 1881 by Peter J. McGuire and Gustav Luebkert. It has become one of the largest trade unions in the United States, and through chapters, and locals, there is international cooperation that poises the brotherhood for a global role. For example, the North American Chapter has over 520,000 members throughout the continent.

Membership (US records; ×1000)

== Early years ==
The union was created on August 12, 1881, by Peter J. McGuire and Gustav Luebkert. The two men organized groups for collective bargaining, and started a newspaper called The Carpenter to facilitate their idea of a national union. The Brotherhood held its first convention in Chicago in August 1881. The cornerstone of local and regional affiliations in support of common goals was laid out to show ways to maximize the unions bargaining potential. The immediate common goals were wage and hour demands, and death and sickness benefits. The union grew from its 1881 membership of 2000, to 50,000 by 1890, and 100,000 by 1900.

While Peter J. McGuire was a socialist, the union itself was non-political, refusing to endorse any political party or philosophy. It was not, on the other hand, apolitical: it supported legislation establishing the eight-hour day.

The union also struck to obtain the eight-hour day, calling a strike of its affiliates for May 1, 1886. The strike itself was ineffective and provoked a repressive response, particularly in Chicago, where police shot and killed two strikers two days later, leading to the Haymarket Riot the following day.

Even so, the strike gave the Brotherhood added visibility that led to increased membership. The union struck again in 1890, with similarly uneven results, but now facing the stiffened resistance of newly formed employers associations.

The Brotherhood admitted both black and white carpenters on an equal footing when it was first formed; one of the union's vice-presidents in its early years was L.E. Rames, an African-American carpenter from Charleston, South Carolina. In the South, however, the union often isolated black carpenters in segregated locals as a concession to the opposition of white carpenters and contractors. Local unions also often excluded black workers on a de facto basis. The union formally dissolved its segregated locals in 1963.

The union also faced fierce pressures from outside to exclude black carpenters: in 1919 supervisors from the Great Southern Lumber Company, the mayor of Bogalusa, Louisiana, and local businessmen affiliated with the Ku Klux Klan, attacked and killed four union organizers who had attempted to organize black and white lumber mill workers. None of the attackers were convicted of any crimes.

== Expansion and conflict ==
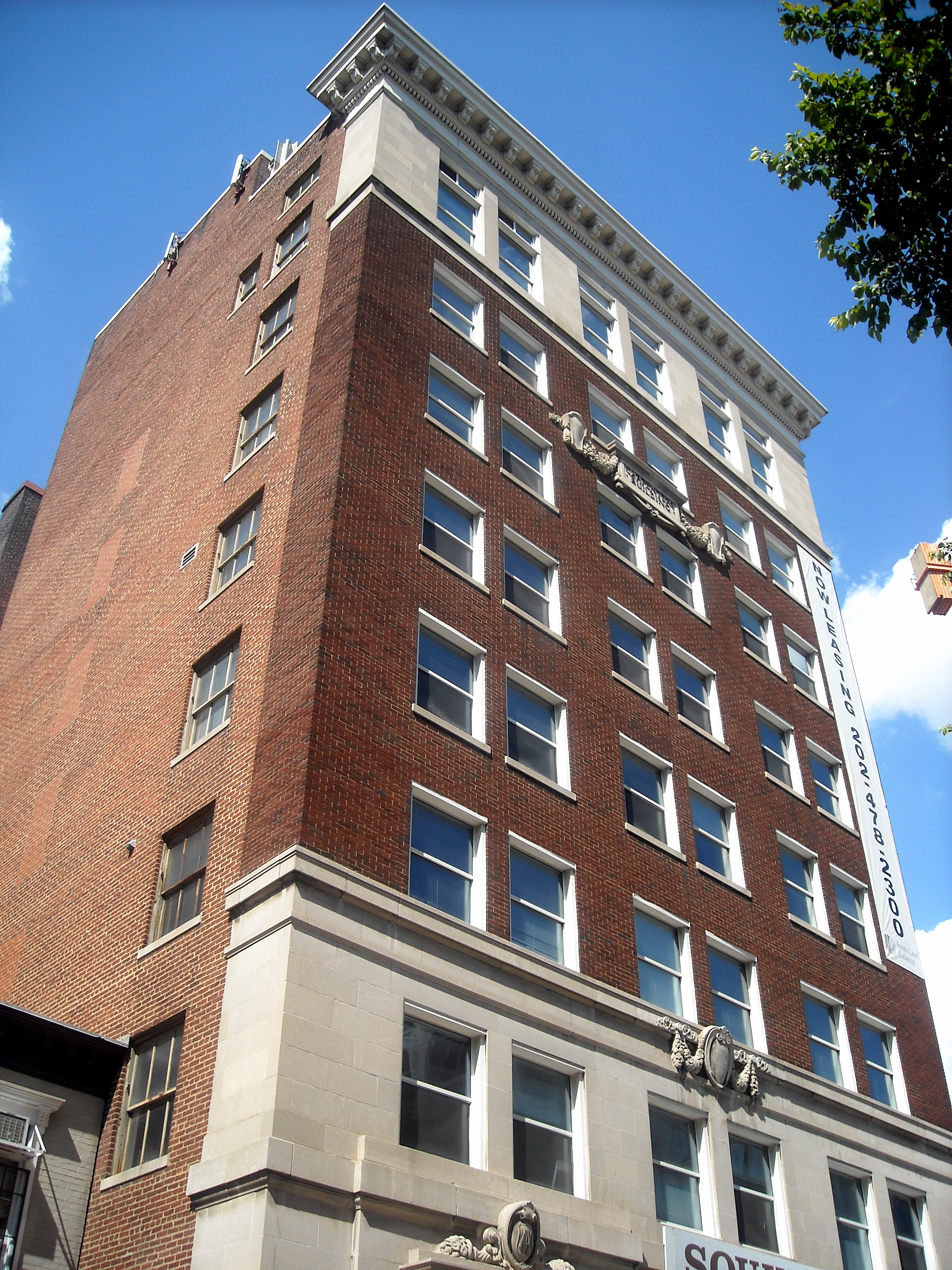
The Carpenters Building, also known as the United Brotherhood of Carpenters and Joiners of America, Local 132, was built in Washington, D.C., in 1926. It is listed on the National Register of Historic Places.

McGuire was forced out of office in 1901 by Frank Duffy and others after a scandal concerning his inability to account for all of the funds received by the union. Many rank and file members of the time suspected that McGuire was framed by elements within the growing bureaucracy of the Carpenters' Union, with whom McGuire had fought several political battles over their attempts to gain more power over rank and file/local union control.

McGuire's successors took a more aggressive stance toward other unions whose members were performing work that the Carpenters union either considered its own members' right to perform or saw as a threat to their craft traditions. The union waged jurisdictional strikes to claim work that other unions, such as the Machinists, Sheet Metal Workers and Electrical Workers claimed as theirs. The Carpenters used its size to win many of these disputes. After the death of president James Kirby in 1915, it frequently disaffiliated from the AFL's Building Trades Department to protest those decisions it lost.

In the decade that followed, the union fought off employers' efforts to impose the open shop, which would have made it very difficult for the union to maintain the standards and membership it had won. While the open shop drive may have stalled the Carpenters' growth during the decade, it did not cause the severe membership losses and wage cuts that other unions suffered.

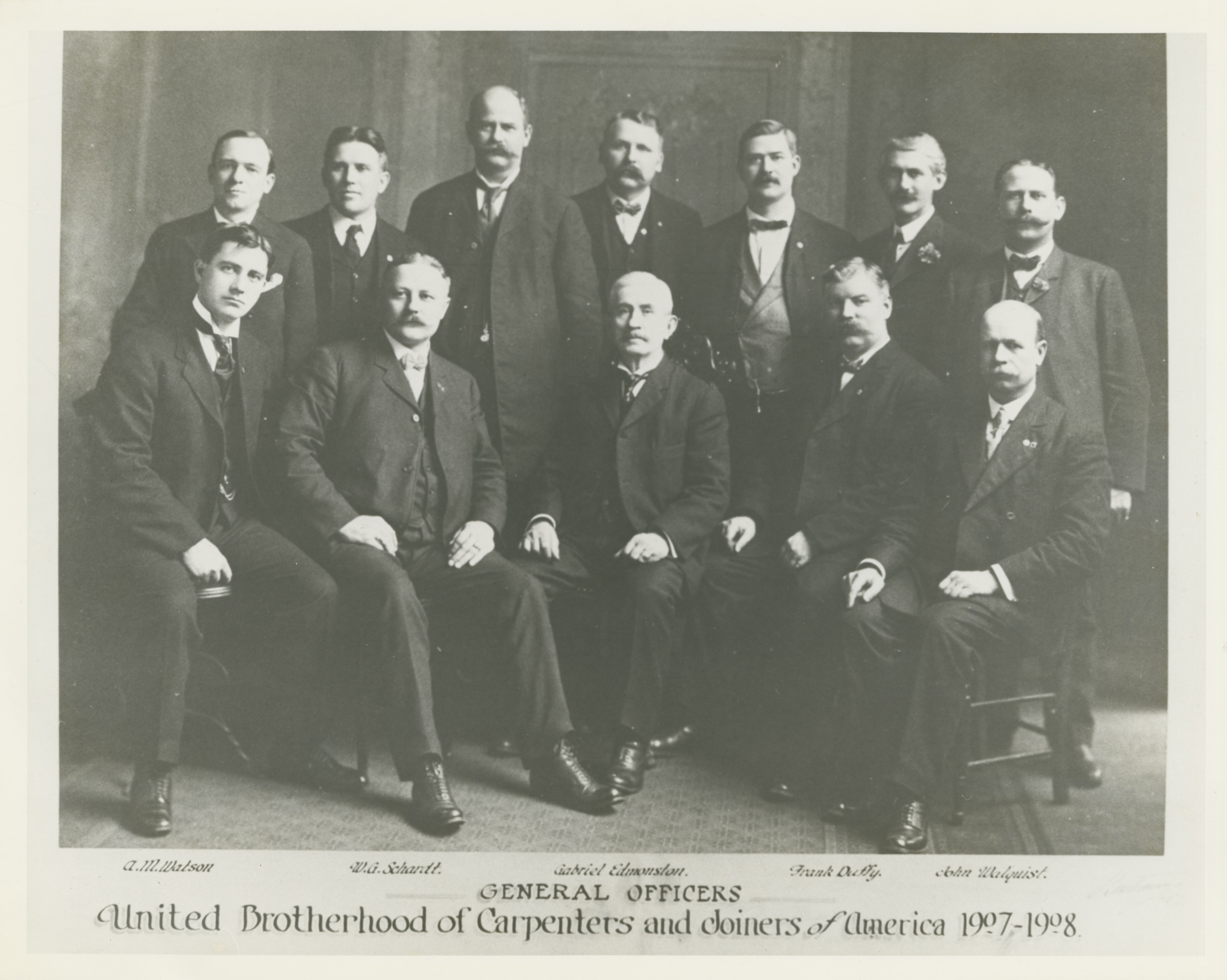
General Officers of the United Brotherhood of Carpenters and Joiners of America, 1907-08. Top row, from left: T.M. Guerin, Arthur A. Quinn, William Huber, D.A. Post, Thomas Neale, R.E.L. Connolly, P.H. McCarthy. Bottom row, from left: A.M. Watson, W.G. Schardt, Gabriel Edmonston, Frank Duffy, John Walquist.

In some areas, the union not only prospered, but elected its own leaders to public office. The head of the most powerful Carpenters local in San Francisco and the head of the San Francisco Building Trades Council, P.H. McCarthy was elected mayor of San Francisco in 1909, while unionists riding the wave of populist enthusiasm won office in many other communities. The union won wage and union protections similar to the Davis-Bacon Act during World War I.

The Carpenters fought these same open shop battles a second time, after the end of World War I, when employers tried to impose their "American Plan" in the centers of union strength, such as San Francisco and Chicago. While the employers were successful in some areas, the Carpenters came out of the 1920s with improved wages and relatively slight losses in membership.

== Depression and change ==
The union lost more than half of its members in the first years of the Great Depression as construction dwindled to almost nothing. The Union at first opposed unemployment insurance, consistent with the conservative politics of the AFL and the deep-seated opposition of its President William Hutcheson to governmental intervention of any sort in labor and employment matters. The union eventually dropped its opposition to unemployment insurance by 1934.

The union also opposed industrial unionism, claiming the right to represent any workers who might perform framing or other traditional carpenters' duties in industrial settings. While the union made concessions to those unions, such as the United Mine Workers of America, that had already established themselves as industrial unions, it opposed any support for organizing workers in mass production industries or permitting such organizations to affiliate with the AFL unless they first surrendered their skilled trade members.

This dispute came to a head at the AFL's convention in Atlantic City in 1935, when Hutcheson interrupted a speech by a representative of the committee that was attempting to organize tire factory workers with a point of order. John L. Lewis, President of the Mine Workers, responded that Hutcheson's point of order was "small potatoes," to which Hutcheson replied "I was raised on small potatoes, that is why I am so small." Lewis left the podium and, after some more words, knocked Hutcheson down, then relit his cigar and returned to the rostrum. Lewis and a number of other unions left the AFL two years later to form the Congress of Industrial Organizations.

While the Carpenters disdained industrial unionism, they were willing to accept mass production workers into their own union, albeit as second-class members. The Carpenters had fought with the Wood Workers union chartered by the AFL for decades, claiming that any workers who planed wood products that were subsequently used in construction, such as doors, sashes, mouldings and the like, were performing carpenters' work and must be brought within its union. While the Carpenters had never made similar claims on work performed by sawmill workers, much less tried to organize them, the union successfully insisted that the AFL assign the newly created Sawmill and Timber Workers' Union to it in 1935. That forced marriage was not successful, as most of these workers soon bolted to form the International Woodworkers of America and to join the CIO several years later after a recognition strike.

Hutcheson ran the union without room for opposition to his administration; he revoked the charters of locals that opposed him or that he believed to be "communistic". He refused to permit the nomination of candidates to oppose him at the union's convention and named his own son, Maurice Hutcheson, First Vice-president in 1938. Maurice succeeded him on his retirement in 1952.

Hutcheson was a vocal opponent of Franklin Delano Roosevelt, whom he denounced as a "dictator" while campaigning for his opponent, Alf Landon, in 1936. Hutcheson's conservative politics and his conflict with the CIO may have played some part in the government's decision in 1940 to charge Hutcheson and other union leaders for criminal violations of the Sherman Act in 1940. The government claimed that the union's traditional methods of protecting its members' work — jurisdictional strikes, resistance to work-displacing technology, and featherbedding — were illegal restraints of trade. The United States Supreme Court upheld the district court's dismissal of the indictment in the first prosecution brought by the government in United States v. Hutcheson, 312 U.S. 219 (1941), ending any further prosecutions of the Carpenters.

The Carpenters found themselves in an unusual alliance with a coalition of other craft unions in Hollywood, the Conference of Studio Unions, led by Herbert Sorrell of the International Union of Painters and Allied Trades. After a long and drawn out strike caused by a divide and conquer strategy of the producers, CSU found itself forced out of Hollywood, leaving the International Alliance of Theatrical Stage Employees as the primary representative of back lot crafts.

== Challenge from non-union contractors ==
The Carpenters, like other building trades, had not faced serious employer opposition since the 1920s. This changed in the 1970s as the Business Roundtable, made up of the heads of General Motors, General Electric, Exxon, U.S. Steel, DuPont and others, undertook a program to reduce building costs by replacing unionized with non-union contractors. The Roundtable also attempted to weaken the Davis-Bacon Act and other legislation that protected construction workers. The building trades, caught off guard and used to organizing from the top down, lost large amounts of work to non-union contractors in the decades that followed.

== Recent developments ==
The International Union of Wood, Wire and Metal Lathers merged into the Carpenters in 1979, followed in 1988 by the Tile, Marble, Terrazzo, Finishers', Shopworkers' and Granite Cutters' International Union. In 1994, the Association of Western Pulp and Paper Workers affiliated with the Carpenters.

The Carpenters were formerly, like most other craft unions coming out of the AFL, a union that allowed its Locals substantial autonomy in bargaining and representing their members. The Carpenter's International began to consolidate Locals into a District Council system in 1988 and since the International Convention of 2000, a system of "Regional Councils" has been implemented, further reducing the number of districts and high ranking board members from 13 down to 10. While it may be debatable whether McCarron's vision is better or worse for the International Carpenters Union as a whole, they are one of only a very few International Unions in America whose membership has been maintained or grown while most other Unions have seen large declines in membership.

Consolidation of Locals was to address the regionalization of the contracting industry. The contractor who only worked within the local area was quickly becoming a thing of the past, while non-Union contractors were free to move their crews - experienced with the company's methods of operation - from job to job, Union Contractors could not move their workers beyond the borders of the District's jurisdictional boundaries without replacing their crews with new carpenters from the jurisdictional district outside the Contractor's home Council. Union contractors rightfully claimed the situation was making them less competitive than the non-Union crews, and the 50% rule was adopted. Union contractors may now use crews with one local Carpenter for each Company Carpenter on jobs outside their Region. The consolidation greatly expanded the boundaries of a Regional Council's jurisdiction and left the consolidated areas with a larger Council better able to compete with the growing non-Union segment of specialized contractors. Because of the pervasive protectionism practiced by the Locals, free movement of workers within a Council was only possible after this authority was taken from the Locals and given to the Councils in the 1991 UBC Convention.

Within this new system, working Carpenters slowly lost the right to vote for their Local's Business Agents and Organizers, thus consolidating all power into the Regional Council's officers and leaving Locals and rank and file members to vote on Delegate to the intermediary Regional Councils. As the union began reorganizing its system of District Councils to give more power to Regional Councils, it consolidated Locals into fewer Charters and deprived local members of the right to vote on contract ratification, giving into the hands of the Regional Council Delegates as the contracts also expanded covering greater areas than a single Local. However, all contracts are voted on by the rank and file members of the various locals belonging to the Northern California Carpenter's Regional Council.

A Federal Court of Appeals first questioned, then approved the United States Department of Labor's failure to treat these Councils as "local unions" for purposes of the Labor Management Reporting and Disclosure Act's requirements governing local union elections, the department has announced its intent to reconsider its existing regulations on this issue.

The Carpenters disaffiliated from the AFL-CIO in 2001, citing complaints about the National Federation's failure to follow up on its program to organize the unorganized. Other observers attributed the Carpenters' departure to its unhappiness with jurisdictional awards and other restrictions on its ability to raid the jurisdictions of other unions, as well as the AFL-CIO's uncritical and exclusive support of the Democratic Party.

Even after it left the federation, however, the Carpenters formed a temporary alliance, the New Unity Partnership in 2003 and the Change to Win Coalition with other unions — including SEIU, UNITE HERE, and the Laborers — to force the AFL-CIO to consider basic structural changes in order to facilitate organizing. In the summer of 2009, the United Brotherhood of Carpenters disaffiliated from Change to Win after the other affiliates in the Change to Win Coalition demanded the Carpenters cease raiding other Union's membership and allow Carpenter members basic democratic rights.

== Leadership ==
=== Presidents ===
1881: Gabriel Edmonston
1882: John D. Allen
1883: J. P. McGinley
1884: Joseph P. Billingsley
1886: William J. Shields
1888: D. P. Rowland
1890: W. H. Kliver
1892: Henry H. Trenor
1894: Charles B. Owens
1896: Harry Lloyd
1898: John Williams
1899: William Huber
1913: James Kirby
1915: William Hutcheson
1952: Maurice Hutcheson
1972: William Sidell
1980: William Konyha
1982: Patrick J. Campbell
1988: Sigurd Lucassen
1995: Douglas J. McCarron

=== General Secretary-Treasurers ===
From 1901 until 1995, the position was General Secretary.

1881: Peter J. McGuire
1901: Frank Duffy
1948: Albert E. Fischer
1957: Richard E. Livingston
1978: John S. Rodgers
1992: James Patterson
1996: Andris Silins
2019: Michael Capelli
2022: Thomas Flynn
2023: Mark McGriff
2025: Jason Engels

=== General Vice President and Second General Vice President ===
As of 2026, the General Vice President is Gary Perinar and the Second General Vice President is Pete Rodriguez.

== See also ==
- Mark Erlich
- US labor law

== Bibliography ==
- Brooks, Thomas R. Road to Dignity. New York: Simon & Schuster, 1981. ISBN 0-689-11214-9
- Erlich, Mark. With Our Hands: The Story of Carpenters in Massachusetts. Philadelphia, Pa.: Temple University Press, 1986. ISBN 0-87722-433-1
- Galenson, Walter. The United Brotherhood of Carpenters: The First Hundred Years. Cambridge, Mass.: Harvard University Press, 1983. ISBN 0-674-92196-8
- Geoghegan, Thomas. Which Side Are You On? Rev. ed. New York: The New Press, 2004. ISBN 1-56584-886-1
- Johnson, Clyde. Organize or Die: Smash Boss Unionism - Build Union Power. Self-published, 1970.
- Johnson, Clyde. Millmen 550—A History of the Militant Years (1961–1966) of Local 550, United Brotherhood of Carpenters. Self-published, 1990.
- Kazin, Michael. Barons of Labor: The San Francisco Building Trades and Union Power in the Progressive Era. Champaign, Ill.: University of Illinois Press, 1987. ISBN 0-252-01345-X
- Schneirov, Richard and Suhrbur, Thomas J. Union Brotherhood, Union Town: The History of the Carpenters' Union of Chicago, 1863-1987. Carbondale, Ill.: Southern Illinois University Press, 1988. ISBN 0-8093-1352-9
