= Douglas J. McCarron =

American labor union leader (born 1950)

- Born: Douglas J. McCarron; 1950 (age 75–76); Chatsworth, California, U.S.
- Employer: United Brotherhood of Carpenters and Joiners of America
- Title: President

Douglas J. McCarron (born 1950) is an American labor union activist, who has served as the president of the United Brotherhood of Carpenters and Joiners of America since 1995.

== Early life and career ==
McCarron was born in 1950 in Chatsworth, California. His father was a meat cutter in a supermarket. While still in high school, he married and had a daughter. Dropping out of high school his senior year, he took a job as a construction worker, hanging drywall. He quickly joined the carpenters' union.

In 1980, McCarron was elected president of his local union. He was named to the negotiating team of the Southern California Council of Carpenters, a regional body covering contractors and other employers in 11 counties. During this time, he came to the attention of leaders with the national carpenters union.

In late 1984, McCarron was named a trustee of the Southern California Pension Fund, the carpenters' union retirement fund. In late 1985 and early 1986, McCarron discovered that $130 million in loans to construction companies were delinquent but no action had been taken by the other trustees. Working with Ron Tutor, a construction company owner and co-chairman of the fund's board of trustees, McCarron and others filed a federal civil suit alleging that the pension fund trustees had made sweetheart loans to employer trustees, masking the loans as investments. Several of the construction projects had failed, with the fund suffering significant losses. The suit was settled out of court 1989 when insurance companies representing the trustees and construction companies paid the fund $30 million. Under the terms of the settlement, all the defendants agreed to immediately and permanently resign from the pension fund's board.

McCarron's relationship with Tutor was not without controversy. In 1993, the carpenters' pension fund made a large investment in a company which held televised boxing matches at a Palm Springs, California, hotel owned by the fund, and a $40 million investment in a company that supplied nearly all the concrete for one of Tutor's construction companies. The value of the latter investment declined by 31 percent, leading union members to call for a federal investigation.

== District council tenure ==
McCarron was elected secretary-treasurer of the Southern California Council of Carpenters in 1987. He quickly reorganized the union, a move which became a hallmark of his later career as international union president. At the time, the Southern California carpenters' union had hundreds of mostly autonomous local unions which managed their own affairs (some well, some not), set their own work rules, competed with one another for jobs, and ran their own hiring halls. The district council had little power. Employers, however, wanted to work with just the district council, one set of rules and one wage structure.

McCarron quickly began merging locals, sometimes through elections and sometimes through trusteeship. In 1988, he forced 18 Southern California locals to merge, leaving only four large ones. Using the union's trusteeship powers, he appointed new leaders to the newly merged locals and transferred most of their assets to the district council. The mergers caused heated political and legal battles. Five locals sued to stop the forced merger in federal court, but lost.

International union officials, who had already consolidated the number of union locals to 1,466 from 2,200 since 1978, sided with McCarron, and the wave of consolidations continued.

Some union members questioned McCarron's motivation for the mergers. For example, in 1991, several carpenter locals in Orange and Riverside counties were trusteed. The locals were forcibly merged into a new affiliate, Local 803, which was in turn supervised from McCarron's Los Angeles offices. In 1992, carpenters' international union president Sigurd Lucassen and McCarron ordered a snap one-day election to select new Local 803 leaders. Nominations and the election were held on the same night. Of the 3,400 active and retired members eligible to vote, only 140 did so. Union members appealed the election results to the international union, which rejected the complaint. The union members then complained to United States Department of Labor (DOL), arguing that union officials were trying to use the election to tighten their control over Local 803. A federal judge agreed, noting that Lucassen and McCarron had violated federal labor law and the union's own constitution.

== Rise to the presidency ==
There was turmoil at the top of the national union as well, which eventually vaulted McCarron into the union's presidency.

=== Turmoil in the Carpenters ===
Leadership of the carpenters' union had turned over quickly in the 1980s, causing political instability in the union. President William Sidell had retired unexpectedly on December 31, 1979. William Konyha was elected to replace him on January 1, 1980, winning the regularly scheduled presidential election in August 1981. But Konyha served little longer than a year, resigning as union president on October 31, 1982. First vice president Patrick J. Campbell assumed the presidency, and won election outright in 1985. But Campbell, too, resigned from office, stepping down for health reasons in February 1988. First vice president Sigurd Lucassen was appointed president to succeed him.

Making matters worse, the union had been rocked by financial scandal. In 1989, Lucassen told union members that Campbell had approved $95 million in loans to various builders, only to have nearly all the construction projects lose money or declare bankruptcy. Half the union's annual budget of $200 million might be needed to write off the loans. Lucassen blamed Campbell and bad advice from investment advisors, and initiated several lawsuits against them. But several elected union leaders accused Lucassen in federal court of colluding with Campbell to approve the loans.

When Lucassen ran for election outright in 1991, he was challenged by the union's national secretary, John S. "Whitey" Rogers. It was the first contested election for presidency of the carpenters' union since 1915. The election split the union's 15-member general executive board, with half the members supporting Lucassen's slate and half supporting Rogers' slate. In a hotly contested election rife with allegations of fraud, Lucassen and his running mates Dean Sooter, first vice president; Paschal McGuinness, second vice president; Jim Patterson, general secretary; and Jim Bledsoe, general treasurer, won. Sooter stepped down in 1993, and McGuinness became first vice president. McCarron was then appointed by the executive board as second vice president.

=== Tenure as second vice president ===
As second vice president, McCarron won acclaim for helping to organize new members. A large number of Southern California non-union drywall workers had struck for higher wages and better working conditions in 1992. McCarron got the national union to provide the workers with money, staff and other resources. Still secretary-treasurer of the Southern California district council, McCarron used the district council's resources to support those drywallers as well. The workers not only won their demands but formed a union and joined the carpenters. It was a major victory for the union, and one which enhanced McCarron's reputation among rank and file members.

=== Election as president ===
Rogers asked DOL to overturn the election on the basis of fraud. DOL sued the union, and in 1995 reached a settlement with Lucassen and the union calling for a new election. Realizing he could not win after having essentially admitted he had committed fraud in the 1991 election, Lucassen decided not to run. McGuinness, meanwhile, had been accused of, and subsequently settled, racketeering charges and quit the union to run for secretary-treasurer of the Building and Construction Trades Department (BCTD) of the AFL-CIO. Lucassen then appointed McCarron as first vice president. At the 1995 convention, Lucassen announced his retirement and nominated McCarron as general president along with Jim Patterson for the merged secretary-treasurer position and Andris Silins as first vice president. McCarron ran unopposed, and easily won election as president.

== Presidency ==
McCarron quickly implemented organizational reforms on a national level similar to those he had instituted in Southern California. The decision-making authority and assets of the union's 1,400 locals were shifted to 55 regional councils. In Michigan, for example, three district councils and 27 locals were merged into one regional council. McCarron and his leadership team personally appointed most of the leadership (most of them McCarron loyalists), although elections eventually occurred. Local members were stripped of the right to elect business agents and vote on contracts, and permitted to elect only regional delegates. Regional delegates now elected only the district council secretary-treasurer, and the secretary-treasurer appointed the local business agents. Even district councils were not immune to merger, as district councils in Michigan, New England, New York, Oregon, Utah and Washington were merged into large regional councils. McCarron also stripped authority over organizing, political action and union assets from locals, placing it with district or regional councils instead.

McCarron demolished the union's four-story headquarters across the street from the United States Congress in Washington, D.C., and built a 10-story office building in its place. He also built a $100 million training center near Las Vegas, Nevada, and increased training programs at 180 smaller centers throughout the U.S. and Canada.

The changes did not come without cost. Dissident locals, including large ones in Atlanta, Georgia, and San Francisco, California, were trusteed on (allegedly) thin evidence. In 2001, carpenters in the British Columbia Provincial Council of Carpenters voted to disaffiliate from the international union in protest against McCarron's actions. McCarron stated the council had lost too much market share to survive. By 1999, angry union members had formed Carpenters for a Democratic Union to challenge McCarron's actions and unseat him as president.

In August 2000, McCarron won re-election with more than 90 percent of the vote. The election of 2000 was held at the General Convention, with the delegates elected by their locals across the United States and Canada voting in a secret ballot election, held in accordance with Department of Labor Rules and the Unions own constitution. He was reelected in 2005 and again in 2010 where he ran unchallenged.

McCarron endorsed Democratic candidate Hillary Clinton in the 2016 U.S. presidential election.

=== AFL-CIO disaffiliation ===
McCarron led the carpenters' union out of the AFL-CIO in March 2001. "The AFL-CIO continues to operate under the rules and procedures of an era that passed years ago, while the industries that employ our members change from day to day," said McCarron in a letter to AFL-CIO president John Sweeney. As per the rules of the AFL-CIO constitution and bylaws, the carpenters were forced out of the BCTD. Nevertheless, McCarron told his district and regional councils to continue to work closely with BCTD unions. At the same time McCarron ordered his Regional Councils to engage in a campaign of raiding other AFL-CIO Unions

McCarron moved away from the AFL-CIO politically as well. He became one of president George W. Bush's strongest union supporters, and broke with the rest of organized labor to endorse the re-election bid of Florida governor Jeb Bush.

=== ULLICO scandals ===
For several years, McCarron served on the board of directors of the Union Labor Life Insurance Company (ULLICO). In this capacity, however, he was caught up in two scandals.

The first ULLICO scandal occurred in 2002. In June 1998, the New York City local of the carpenters union hired Zenith Administrators, a ULLICO subsidiary, to oversee the union's $1.7 billion pension and benefit funds. In 2002, federal prosecutors and DOL investigated the company for allegedly obtaining the contract through McCarron's influence. DOL sued ULLICO and Zenith Administrators for mismanaging the union's funds, although McCarron himself was not accused of any crimes.

In 2003, McCarron was caught in a second scandal at ULLICO. ULLICO president, chairman and chief executive officer Robert Georgine had instituted a stock trading scheme whereby ULLICO board members – most of whom were labor union officials – could purchase the company's stock at a low price. Since ULLICO was a privately held company, the board members themselves set the stock price. Once they had set the price higher, they could sell their stock at a large profit. The stock repurchase scheme was uncovered, and McCarron and the other directors accused of breaching their fiduciary duty and breaking federal and state securities laws. McCarron returned his profits to ULLICO and resigned from the board.

=== Change to Win ===
Although the carpenters' union was not part of the AFL-CIO in 2005 during the debate over the federation's future and John Sweeney's re-election campaign, McCarron voiced repeated approval of the goals of the Andrew Stern-led New Unity Partnership (which eventually became the Change to Win Federation). McCarron led the carpenters into Change to Win in August 2005 as one of the coalition's founding unions but the union was forced out in 2009 when the Carpenters attempted to raid several Change to Win affiliate Unions.

== Notes ==
Trade union offices
Preceded by Sigurd Lucassen	President of the United Brotherhood of Carpenters and Joiners of America; 1995-	Succeeded by Incumbent
