= IATSE Broadcast Department =

US and Canadian labor union

The IATSE Broadcast Department is the broadcast department of the International Alliance of Theatrical Stage Employees, a US and Canadian labor union.

== History ==
It was established on June 4, 2012, under International President Matt Loeb, to coordinate the union's organizing and representation efforts in television broadcasting and related fields. Its creation reflected the growing presence of IATSE in live television, sports, and other broadcast productions. Sandra England, a longtime International Representative, was appointed as the department's first director. She served from 2012 until her retirement in 2019, concluding a 29-year career with IATSE.

Loeb appointed Steve Belsky and Fran O'Hern to be co-directors of the broadcast department in February 2019.

=== Growth ===
IATSE began representing broadcast technicians at television news stations in the 1940s. In 1993, technicians based in Los Angeles, California organized with five Hollywood motion picture and television locals to cover productions for teams including the Los Angeles Lakers and Clippers (NBA), the Los Angeles Kings and Anaheim Ducks (NHL), and the Los Angeles Angels and Dodgers (MLB).

In 1998, the first Broadcast Local was chartered in Seattle, Washington and Portland, Oregon, Local 793.

Today, IATSE has nineteen locals representing broadcast workers in thirty-three major U.S. cities. Collectively, these locals cover more than 6,000 professional and collegiate sports and entertainment broadcasts annually under union contracts.

=== 2012 PAC 12 Network strike ===
On December 8, 2012, IATSE President Matthew Loeb and the General Executive Board declared the Pac-12 Network an unfair employer. Picket lines were established at five university campuses hosting men's basketball games: Arizona State University (Tempe), Oregon State University (Corvallis), University of Oregon (Eugene), University of Washington (Seattle), and University of Southern California at Los Angeles. The strike lasted ten days, during which multiple game productions were disrupted. It concluded when the network's Executive Vice President and General Manager, Lydia Murphy-Stephans, agreed to renew negotiations with IATSE in January 2013.

At the time, IATSE had broadcast locals representing technicians on the campuses of the University of Washington, Washington State University, University of Oregon, Oregon State University, University of California, Berkeley, Stanford University, University of Southern California, University of California, Los Angeles, University of Arizona and Arizona State University.

Despite these efforts, the Pac-12 Network and IATSE did not reach an agreement, and network broadcasts have remained non-union from 2012 to the present.

=== 2015 Golf Channel Decertification ===
In 2015, Golf Channel employee John Gallagher filed a decertification petition with the NLRB. After multiple irregularities in the voting process a new election was ordered to be run.

In 2017, the election was again run by the NLRB and IATSE prevailed with over 70% voting in favor of IATSE representation.

=== 2018 Golf Channel strike ===
In January 2018, following nine months of negotiations, technicians represented by IATSE went on strike against the Golf Channel. The work stoppage disrupted coverage of several tournaments, including the PGA Tour Champions and Web.com Tour's Bahamas Great Exuma Classic, the Diamond Resorts Invitational in Orlando, and the Sony Open in Hawaii.

The union cited comparatively low pay and benefits relative to other networks broadcasting golf, such as CBS and NBC.

After eleven days, IATSE and the Golf Channel reached an agreement on a two-year contract. Sandra England, Department Director of Broadcast for IATSE, described the deal as "a huge win for broadcast technicians working in the highly specialized world of golf programming," noting the unprecedented solidarity among broadcast unions during the strike. IBEW & NABET.

=== 2022 Minnesota United strike ===
The Minnesota United IATSE strike took place in 2023 when the in-house production crew for Minnesota United FC, including camera operators, sound technicians, and video board operators, voted to unionize under IATSE Local 745. After the club declined voluntary recognition, the workers secured representation through a National Labor Relations Board election in September 2022. The union sought higher wages, cost-of-living adjustments, improved benefits, and better working conditions.

On October 7, 2023, Local 745 members staged a strike during Minnesota United's final regular-season home match at Allianz Field versus the LA Galaxy. The action resulted in Apple's MLS broadcast not airing and significantly reduced in-stadium technical operations.

In February 2024, the strike concluded with the ratification of the crew's first collective bargaining agreement. The three-year contract provided wage increases. The settlement was viewed as one of the first significant union contracts for in-house stadium production crews in Minnesota and reflected a broader trend of sports broadcast workers organizing for better compensation in response to the increasing demand for live event coverage.

=== Big Ten Network ===
Beginning in 2013, Minnesota Local 745 and Wisconsin Local 414 filed representation petitions with the NLRB. Both Locals were successful in NLRB conducted elections. This made Big Ten Network the first national cable college sports channel to be represented by a union.

In 2018, Local 762 organized the Big Ten Network game production studio in Chicago, Illinois where Multi-camera Insert Control Room's (MICR) were located. These control rooms produce over 375 separate sports productions per year.

In 2025, the Big Ten Network studio pre and post game technicians organized and won an election and joined IATSE Local 762.

Local	University	Year	Election
745	Minnesota	2014	37 YES - 26 NO
414	Wisconsin	2014	29 YES - 6 NO
745	Iowa	2015	Voluntary recognition
100	Rutgers	2014	Paid under PPI contract
317	Purdue	2015	Voluntary recognition
317	Indiana	2015	Voluntary recognition
762	MICR	2018	28 YES - 16 NO
313	Michigan	2024	39 YES - 1 NO
216	Ohio State	2025	Paid under PPI contract
313	Michigan State	2024	39 YES - 1 NO
793	Washington	2024	Voluntary recognition
793	Oregon	2024	Voluntary recognition
600, 695, 700, 800, 871	USC	2024	Voluntary recognition
600, 695, 700, 800, 871	UCLA	2024	Voluntary recognition
762	Studio	2024	27 YES - 2 NO

The BTN Studio was originally represented by NABET Local 41, winning an NLRB election in 2019, 8 YES - 0 NO, out of 35 eligible voters. After subsequent AFL-CIO Article XX challenges by NABET, a neutral arbitrator ruled that NABET abandoned the bargaining unit. IATSE later filed for an election with the NLRB and ratified an agreement in September 2025.

== Sports broadcast locals ==
Local	Market	Charter Date
600	Los Angeles, California (Camera, Video, Utility)	January 1, 1993
695	Los Angeles, California (Audio, Replay)	January 1, 1993
700	Los Angeles, California (Technical Director)	January 1, 1993
800	Los Angeles, California (Graphics, Scorebox)	January 1, 1993
871	Los Angeles, California (Stage Manager, Graphics Coordinator)	January 1, 1993
793	Seattle, Washington & Portland, Oregon	April 1, 1998
795	San Diego, California	April 15, 1999
796	Austin, Dallas, Houston, San Antonio, Texas	October 1, 2000
119	San Francisco, Oakland, San Jose, Sacramento, California	April 1, 2002
748	Phoenix, Arizona	April 1, 2003
100	New York, New York	April 1, 2005
762	Chicago, Illinois	July 1, 2006
745	Minneapolis-St Paul, Minnesota & Iowa	July 1, 2009
414	Milwaukee-Madison, Wisconsin	January 1, 2015
317	Indianapolis, West-Lafayette, Bloomington, Indiana	March 10, 2017
305	Miami, Florida	April 1, 2021
216	Cleveland & Columbus, Ohio	February 1, 2024
487	Baltimore, Maryland & Washington DC (Mixed Studio Mechanics & Broadcast)	January 1, 1990
313	Detroit, Ann Arbor & East Lansing, Michigan	Pending

== News locals ==
Local	Market	Charter Date
794	New York, New York	1945
804	Philadelphia, Pennsylvania	1946
819	Washington DC	1941
820	Pittsburgh, Pennsylvania	1949
833	Baltimore, Maryland	
926	Auburn, Maine	1941

== National locals ==
Local	Market	Charter Date
444	Golf Channel	

== Directors ==
Director	Years
Sandra England	2012 - 2019
Steve Belsky	2019–present
Fran O'Hern	2019–present

== Links ==
IATSE Broadcast Department

Twitter
