= Sigurd Lucassen =

American labor leader

- Born: July 11, 1927; Brooklyn, New York, United States
- Died: March 23, 2001 (aged 73); Middletown Township, New Jersey, United States
- Occupations: Carpenter; President, United Brotherhood of Carpenters and Joiners of America
- Spouse: Audrey West
- Children: One son, one daughter

Sigurd Lucassen (July 11, 1927 – March 23, 2001) was a carpenter and an American labor leader. He was president of the United Brotherhood of Carpenters and Joiners of America from February 1988 to 1995.

== Early life ==
Lucassen was born in Brooklyn, New York, to Erling and Clara Lucassen in 1927. His parents were both Norwegian immigrants. His father was a unionized carpenter, and his mother a unionized garment worker. Lucassen was rarely called by his full first name, and most people referred to him as "Sig" or "Siggy."

When the Great Depression began in 1929, the Lucassens moved about 40 miles (64 km) south to Long Branch, New Jersey, a small beach town on the Jersey Shore. Although his father often was out of work, his mother (a member of the International Ladies Garment Workers Union) continued to hold a full-time job and support Sigurd, his father and his brothers.

Lucassen went to work stacking fish in an ice house when he was nine years old. Despite having to work, he continued to attend school. He played football at Long Branch High School, where he received good grades and graduated in 1946.

Lucassen went to work as a nonunion carpenter after high school in order to gain skill as a carpenter. A year later, in 1947, he married Audrey West—a girl he had known since elementary school. The couple had two children (a son and a daughter).

In 1952, Lucassen joined Local 2250 of the United Brotherhood of Carpenters. He became a committed unionist, and was elected business representative of his local in 1960. He became known as a skilled negotiator. Lucassen was eventually elected president of his local, and was elected to several positions in the Carpenters' state organization. Convinced that apprenticeship and training programs were important to growing the union as well as providing skilled labor for economic growth and development, Lucassen co-founded and helped raise funds for the New Jersey Alliance for Action, a labor-management development coalition which sponsored apprentice and journeyman programs.

Lucassen was appointed a vice president of the United Brotherhood of Carpenters in the 1970s. He moved to northern Virginia and worked out of the union's headquarters in Washington, D.C.

== Election as president ==
In October 1982, Carpenters president William Konyha unexpectedly retired and first vice president Patrick J. Campbell assumed the presidency. Campbell won election outright in 1985. But Campbell, too, resigned from office early, stepping down for health reasons in February 1988. First vice president Sigurd Lucassen was appointed president to succeed him.

In September 1989, Lucassen revealed that Campbell had approved $95 million in loans to various builders, only to have nearly all the construction projects lose money or declare bankruptcy. Half the union's annual budget of $200 million might be needed to write off the loans. Lucassen blamed Campbell and bad advice from investment advisors, and initiated several lawsuits against them. But several elected union leaders and union members accused Lucassen in federal court of colluding with Campbell to approve the loans.

When Lucassen ran for election outright in 1991, he was challenged by the union's national secretary, John S. "Whitey" Rogers. It was the first contested election for presidency of the carpenters' union since 1915. The election split the union's 15-member general executive board, with half the members supporting Lucassen's slate and half supporting Rogers' slate. In a hotly contested election rife with allegations of fraud, Lucassen and his running mates Dean Sooter, first vice president; Paschal McGuinness, second vice president; Jim Patterson, general secretary; and Jim Bledsoe, general treasurer, won. Sooter stepped down in 1993, and McGuinness became first vice president. Lucassen appointed Douglas J. McCarron, secretary-treasurer of the Southern California Council of Carpenters, second vice president.

== Presidency ==
Lucassen instituted a general policy of consolidating locals throughout the country. He began the process as soon as he took office. He consolidated locals in Los Angeles in 1988, in San Diego in 1990 and Orange and Riverside counties in California in 1991. Although members challenged the consolidations, a federal appeals court upheld union Lucassen's right to force consolidations if they are in the interest of union members.

Lucassen was an active participant in the controversy over the spotted owl and the harvesting of timber in old growth forests. He strongly opposed any Endangered Species Act protection for the spotted owl in Washington, denounced existing protections for old-growth forests, demanded that these and other federally-owned timberlands be opened for extensive logging, and launched scathing attacks on environmentalists. When the federal government offered job retraining funds to the union to assist workers out of work due to federal forest policies, Lucassen angrily turned the grants down.

In June 1991, Lucassen launched a "Ready to Rebuild America" campaign. The goal of the publicity effort was to build support for major new federal public works projects which would employ, among others, out-of-work carpenters.

In 1993, a federal judge castigated Lucassen for snap elections he had ordered in a Los Angeles local. U.S. district court judge Edward Rafeedie ordered new elections for Local 803 in Orange County, California. After imposing a trusteeship on the local in 1991, Lucassen ordered Southern California Council secretary-treasurer McCarron to hold elections on just a few days' notice. Nominations and voting were held in the same 24-hour period. Local union members sued, and Judge Rafeedie agreed that the elections were illegally held. Rafeedie singled Lucassen out, writing that the way the elections were handled lent credence "to the inference that this election was intended to produce certain results."

In 1994, a federal jury in Arkansas found the Carpenters and the United Paperworkers International Union guilty of tortious business interference. BE&K Construction had won a bid from the Potlatch Corporation to upgrade and expand a pulp and paper mill. A short time later, the jury found, Potlatch canceled the contract after union representatives threatened pickets, arson, violence and rioting. Lucassen denounced the $10 million award against the union, and appealed.

In 1995, Lucassen imposed a trusteeship on Carpenters Local 17 in New York City. The local, which represented carpenters at the Jacob K. Javits Convention Center had been accused by a federal investigator of giving work to only a few, select members of the local union who were involved with organized crime.

=== Involvement in BCTD affairs ===
In 1995, Robert Georgine was challenged for the presidency of Building and Construction Trades Department, AFL-CIO (BCTD) by A. L. "Mike" Monroe, president of the International Union of Painters and Allied Trades. The Carpenters were the largest BCTD affiliate, and Lucassen opposed Georgine's re-election even though Georgine's running mate was Carpenters' first vice president Paschal McGuinness. Monroe, Lucassen and others argued that Georgine had failed to maintain the effectiveness of local BCTD councils, refused to fund organizing programs and allowed jurisdictional disputes to get out of hand. They also claimed that Georgine's role as chief executive officer of ULLICO left him little time to devote to BCTD business. In a close election, however, Georgine won.

=== Support for Sweeney insurgency ===
In 1995, John Sweeney, president of the Service Employees International Union, challenged incumbent Lane Kirkland for the presidency of the AFL-CIO. The race was a bitter one, and Kirkland resigned the presidency of the AFL-CIO in mid-election. Thomas R. Donahue, the AFL-CIO secretary-treasurer, was named acting president of the federation and ran for president in his own right.

Lucassen was an early and strong Sweeney supporter. Although Lucassen's retirement was seen by some as possibly moving the Carpenters union into the Donahue camp, most union delegates to the AFL-CIO convention voted for Sweeney.

== Retirement ==
In 1993, "Whitey" Rogers asked the U.S. Department of Labor to overturn the Carpenters' 1991 election on the basis of fraud. He presented his case to the United States Department of Labor (DOL), which agreed that the election should be overturned. DOL sued the union, and in 1995 reached a settlement with Lucassen and the union calling for a new election. Realizing he could not win after having essentially admitted he had committed fraud in the 1991 election, Lucassen chose to retire instead. McGuinness, meanwhile, had been accused of, and subsequently settled, racketeering charges and had quit his international union post to run for secretary-treasurer of the BCTD.

At the 1995 convention, Lucassen announced his retirement and nominated McCarron as general president. He also nominated Jim Patterson for the merged secretary-treasurer position and Andris Silins as first vice president.

McCarron ran unopposed, and easily won election as president.

== Retirement and death ==
Lucassen retired to Middletown Township, New Jersey, where he had purchased and restored a home. He built ice boats and sailed them in the winter. Lucassen died in March 2001.

The New Jersey Alliance for Action annually awards the Sigurd Lucassen Labor Award in his honor.

== Notes ==
Trade union offices
Preceded by Patrick J. Campbell	President, United Brotherhood of Carpenters and Joiners of America; February 1988 – 1995	Succeeded by Douglas J. McCarron
