= Martin Forde =

American labor union activist (1923–2022)

Martin J. Forde (November 22, 1923 – December 9, 2022) was an American labor union activist.

== Life ==
=== Early life ===
Martin J. Forde was born in County Mayo, Ireland and emigrated to the United States in 1951. He quickly joined the Carpenter's Union in New York, becoming a member of United Brotherhood of Carpenters Local Union 608 on May 11, 1951.

=== Local 608 Tenure ===
After working as a carpenter for a number of years and working as a Shop Steward at the World Trade Center, he was appointed an Assistant Business Agent by Local 608s President Paschal McGuinness. In 1987, Martin Forde was indicted for extortion and soliciting bribes, along with Johnny O'Connor of Local Union 608. Martin was eventually found guilty of these charges, and was given a suspended sentence on August 31, 1990, on condition of retiring from union office. Local Union 608 subsequently provided Martin with a Lincoln Towncar as a retirement present. Martin continued to exert influence over Local Union 608 policy and politics via his son, Mike Forde.

=== Personal life and death ===
Martin Forde lived in Queens and East Durham, New York. He died at his home in Woodside, New York on December 9, 2022, at the age of 99.
