= Foster Farms =

American poultry company

- Type: Private
- Genre: Poultry
- Founded: Modesto, California, U.S. (1939)
- Headquarters: Livingston, California, U.S.
- Owner: Atlas Holdings
- Website: fosterfarms.com

Foster Farms is a privately held American poultry company since 1939. Operated by the Foster family since its founding, it is currently managed by Atlas Holdings, which acquired the firm in 2022.

Although its operations are concentrated on the West Coast, the Livingston, California-based company also maintains a small number of locations on the East Coast. It specializes in a variety of chicken and turkey products advertised as fresh and naturally locally grown.

== History ==
=== Beginnings ===
Foster Farms was established in 1939 by Max and Verda Foster. They began by investing $1,000 into a farm in Modesto, California, on which they raised turkeys. The back porch was Max's office and the first hatchery was built next to their bedroom so the eggs could get constant care. In 1942, Max quit his day job as a reporter and city editor for the Modesto Bee. Around this time, the Fosters expanded into raising cattle and chickens. As the business grew, the Fosters acquired another farm and a feed mill in the 1950s. The feed mill allowed the company some independence from outside feed contracts. In 1959, Foster Farms acquired the Sunland Poultry processing plant in Livingston, California, and in 1960, the company's headquarters was moved there from Modesto. Livestock were slaughtered, processed, and packaged at the Livingston plant on an assembly line.

=== 1970s ===
In 1969, Max and Verda Foster turned the company over to their son Paul Foster who became President of Foster Farms. In 1973, Foster Farms opened a major distribution center to serve southern California in El Monte, California. In 1977, Paul died of a sudden heart attack, and his brother Thomas became president of the company.

=== 1980s ===
In 1982, the company bought the property of The Grange Company and its branch, Valchris Poultry. After this purchase the company re-entered the turkey business and began to produce deli products under the Foster Farms name. By the 1980s, Foster Farms had many new products to offer, such as bologna, poultry franks and luncheon meats. Sales tripled between 1975 and 1988; by 1987, Foster Farms was selling about 140 million chickens per year, making it the largest chicken producer in California. The company's hens laid around 2.2 million eggs per week, which were then transported to hatcheries and kept in an incubator for 18 days. When the chicks hatched, they were taken to different ranches for about 52 days, while they ate the company's own corn and soybean meals.

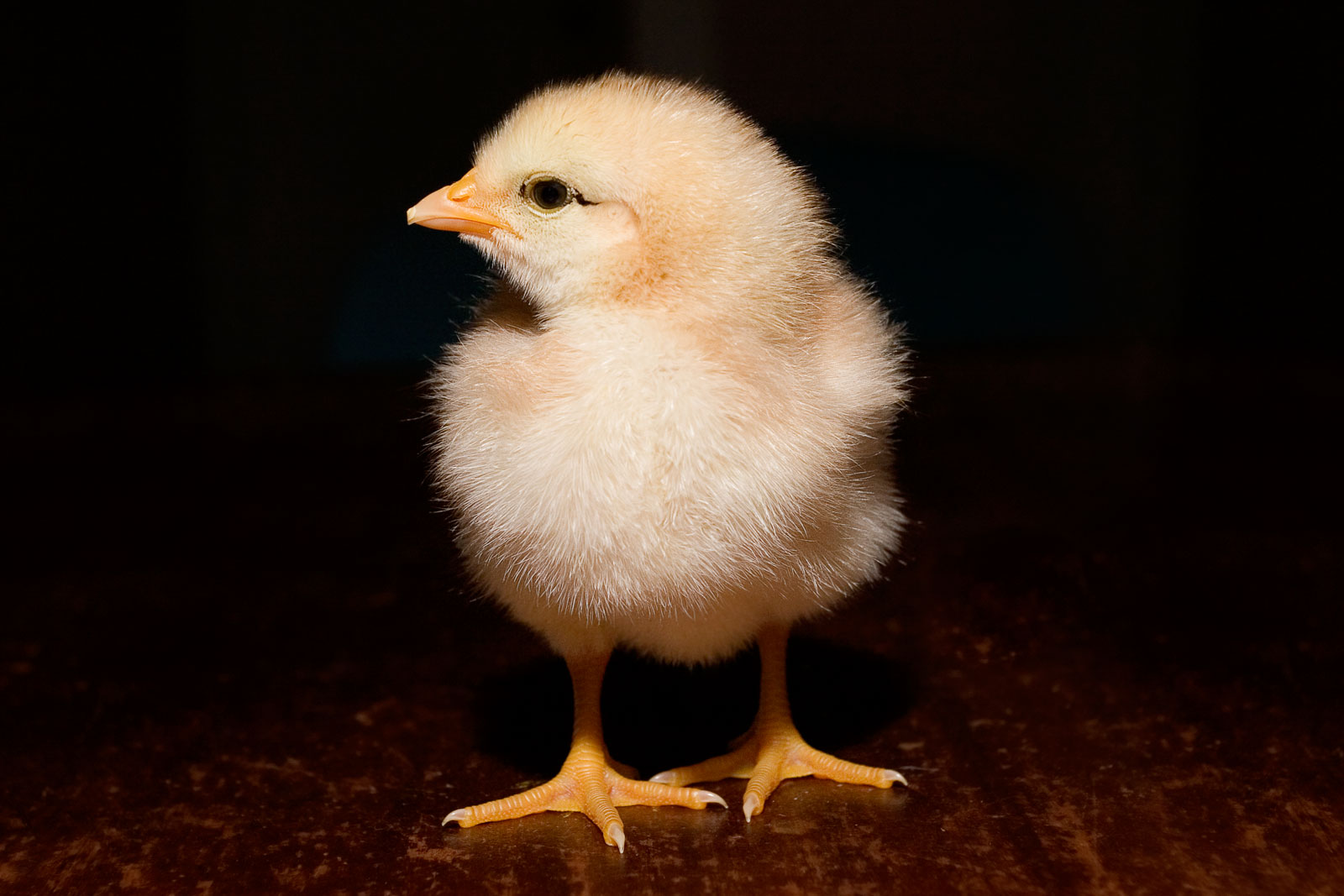
A day-old chick

Throughout the 1980s, Foster Farms began to make commercials, with one winning a Clio Award in 1988. By the mid-1980s, their sales had continued to improve, and they expanded again, purchasing Oregon's largest poultry producer, Fircrest Farms in Creswell, in 1987. In 1988, the company leadership decided to increase production capacity. They created a new fryer ranch with one million square feet of poultry housing in Merced, California, upgraded their feed mill in Ceres, California, and built a new 85,000-square-foot (7,900 m^{2}) distribution facility and sales office for Northern California in Livingston. In November 1989, Foster Farms obtained a turkey processing plant in Fresno, California, from Roxford Foods. The turkey processing plant was converted into a chicken processing plant; new equipment was added that enabled the plant to process 80 million more chickens a year.

With the discovery that saturated fat intake was linked to heart disease, Americans began to eat less red meat and more chicken. This change dramatically increased sales for Foster Farms. Sales began to drop in 1987, after a report broadcast on the television newsmagazine show 60 Minutes claimed that a high percentage of chicken was infected with salmonella. In response, the company invited the media to visit its processing centers so that customers could see that Foster Farms chickens were not harmful.

=== 1990s ===
In 1992, brothers George and Tom gave up their roles as president and chief executive to a non-family member, Robert Fox. The Foster brothers remained on the company's board. Sales began to expand once again and so did the company, purchasing Lynden Farms for approximately $8.2 million in 1994. By 1996 annual sales totaled around $900 million. The company had become the largest poultry producer on the entire West Coast and the eighth largest in the nation. In 1997, the company bought the leading poultry producer in Washington, Pederson's Fryer Farms, for approximately $7 million. The company opened a $45 million, 500-job processing facility in South Kelso, Washington in 1998. It also acquired the Butterball Turkey Company's turkey processing plant and feed mill in Turlock, California, along with a hatchery in Fresno, California, and purchased Griffith Foods, an Alabama producer of corn dogs. In 1999 Tom Foster died; George Foster remained active in the company. That same year Foster Farms produced over 750 million pounds of poultry and was the second-largest corn dog producer in the United States.

=== 2000s ===
In October 2001, Foster Farms acquired the chicken operations of Southern California's Zacky Farms. This addition included Zacky Farms' Fresno plant, hatchery, feed mill, and live productions ranches, as well as its Los Angeles distribution center. With the addition of 1,500 new employees, production increased significantly. In 2003, Foster Farms introduced the Fresh & Easy line of individually wrapped, pre-washed boneless, skinless breast and thighs. In 2004, the company built a new distribution center.

==== "Say No to Plumping" ====
In 2007, the company began a campaign to counter plumping, the practice of adding up to 15% weight to raw poultry by injecting it with saltwater and seaweed extract and/or chicken stock. This poultry can still be marketed and sold as "all natural" even though it is artificially enhanced. Foster Farms called upon the U.S. Department of Agriculture to withhold the "all natural" label from plumped chicken. It also instituted a video marketing campaign called "Say No to Plumping" to alert the public to the practice. The campaign won a Gold Effie Award in 2010.

=== 2010s ===
In 2013, Foster Farms was certified as a humane producer by the American Humane Association, becoming the first major broiler chicken producer in the U.S. to carry the American Humane Association seal. The Foster Farms Poultry Education and Research Facility at California State University at Fresno's Jordan College of Agricultural Sciences and Technology was also certified by the American Humane Association.

== Controversies ==
In late 1997, hundreds of employees went on strike for two weeks. They agreed to a new contract and went back to work at the end of October 1997.

In 1998, Foster Poultry Farms pleaded guilty in the United States District Court to a violation of the federal Clean Water Act. The company had dumped 11 million gallons of chicken-manure-polluted water into the San Luis National Wildlife Refuge.

During 2003–2006, workers at the Livingston plant changed their union representation from the United Food and Commercial Workers Union's Local 1288 to the League of Independent Workers of the San Joaquin Valley, which affiliated with the International Association of Machinists. During this process, the workers struggled with Foster Farms to gain recognition of the new union. In October 2005, there was a brief strike.

On June 25, 2018, a truck carrying 5000 chickens crashed in Clark County, WA, killing many of the birds. The truck was en route to Foster Farm's processing plant in Kelso, WA. Animal activists attempted to negotiate with Foster Farms to let them take some of the chickens to animal sanctuaries. Foster Farms refused, citing health risks. One activist was arrested for refusing to release a chicken. The following night a vigil was held to honor the suffering of chickens at Foster Farms and elsewhere.

== Salmonella outbreak ==
On October 7, 2013, the U.S. Department of Agriculture issued a public health alert for raw chicken packaged at three Foster Farms facilities in California as an estimated 278 people had fallen ill in the past six months. Strains of multiple antibiotic-resistant Salmonella Heidelberg were associated with chicken distributed to retail outlets in California, Oregon and Washington state. The outbreak spread to 18 states, though most of the reported illnesses were in California. The USDA's Food Safety and Inspection Service did not mandate a recall of chicken from those facilities, lacking the authority to do so. It deemed the company's poultry safe to eat as long as it is cooked to a minimum of 165 degrees Fahrenheit. The USDA agreed to let affected poultry plants remain open after the company agreed to fix problems.

In mid-June 2014, Foster Farms executives announced that via stringent measures the company had cut Salmonella contamination in its raw cut-up chicken to about 2%, well below the national industry average of 25%. They reiterated standard food safety advice to handle raw poultry safely and cook it to at least 165 degrees Fahrenheit.

A PBS Frontline report broadcast in May 2015 drew attention to deficient food safety regulation. Shortly after the report was broadcast, Frontline received a letter from a lawyer representing Foster Farms which previously declined all Frontline requests to present their case for the report. The letter disputed the reported finding by the Oregon Public Health Division that one person had died in a 2004 Salmonella Heidelberg outbreak that the state linked to Foster Farms. Frontline invited Foster Farms once again to discuss their position with them, but they would not do so.

== COVID-19 pandemic ==
By April 20, 2020, four workers were diagnosed with COVID-19 at a Foster Farms plant in Kelso, Washington. Health officials in Cowlitz County, Washington, described the cases as a "cluster". On April 22, Foster Farms reported that an employee at one of its two plants in Fresno, California, had tested positive for coronavirus. Those two plants employ about 3,000 workers. On August 13, Gurpal Samra, the mayor of Livingston, California, announced that Merced County officials had informed him that 217 workers at the local Foster Farms chicken processing plant had COVID-19, and that two workers had died. According to Samra, "There are no guidelines, no books, no manuals, on how to deal with this anywhere at the state level. Even the federal government is in disarray. So Merced County Health, who's never had to deal with this either, is trying to find the best way to work with it." On August 18, the Merced County Public Health Department confirmed that over 300 workers were infected and that seven workers had died. The plant employs over 3,700 people. On August 26, the Merced County Health Department ordered the plant in Livingston closed. By that time, 358 workers were confirmed to have the coronavirus, and eight had died. California Attorney General Xavier Becerra stated "Foster Farms' poultry operation in Livingston, California, has experienced an alarming spread of COVID-19 among its workers. Nobody can ignore the facts: It's time to hit the reset button on Foster Farms' Livingston plant." The following day, the California Department of Public Health released a letter stating that Foster Farms has a "legal obligation to comply with public health orders and guidance, as well as an obligation to its workers and to the people of Merced County and surrounding counties and that these obligations compel Foster Farms to immediately comply with the order issued yesterday by the County". The agency reported that "other Foster Farms facilities in multiple counties also are experiencing outbreaks".

== Finances and industry statistics ==
Also in 2005, Foster Farms was awarded California's highest environmental honor, the Governor's Environmental and Economic Leadership Award (GEELA), from Governor Arnold Schwarzenegger. The GEELA program recognizes exceptional leadership and notable contributions in conserving California's resources and recognizes the significance of a joint project between Foster Farms and the East Bay Municipal Utility District (EBMUD).

The company received the 2005 POWER Award from Public Officials for Water and Environmental Reform. The annual POWER Award honors companies that provide solutions to the state's water issues and serve as models to others in this regard.

Foster Farms is one of the biggest West Coast poultry producers. The revenue increase has been accompanied by a decrease in manpower. As of December 2007, the company's revenues stood at approximately $2.00 billion, an 11.1% change in revenue from the previous year. At the same time, the company was estimated to employ approximately 10,500 people.

== See also ==
- Crystal Creamery
- League of Independent Workers of the San Joaquin Valley
- Impact of the 2019–20 coronavirus pandemic on the meat industry in the United States
