= George Kourpias =

American labor union leader

George J. Kourpias (June 10, 1932 – December 2, 2019) was an American labor union leader.

Born in Sioux City, Iowa, Kourpias began working at the Zenith Corporation in 1952, and joined the International Association of Machinists and Aerospace Workers (IAM). He soon became active on his local central labor council and the Iowa AFL-CIO, then became president of his district of the union. In 1964, he began working full-time for the international union as an administrative assistant, rising to become executive assistant to the president in 1979, and then general vice president in 1983.

In 1989, Kourpias was elected as president of the IAM. As leader of the union, Kourpias led a strike at Eastern Air Lines, and negotiated a potential merger with the United Auto Workers. He also served as chair of the international department of the AFL-CIO, in which role he supported the anti-apartheid movement in South Africa. He also served on the executive council of the federation, and as one of its vice-presidents.

He retired from his union posts in 1997, then in 2001 became the founding president of the Alliance for Retired Americans.

Trade union offices
Preceded by William W. Winpisinger	President of the International Association of Machinists and Aerospace Workers; 1989–1997	Succeeded by Tom Buffenbarger
Non-profit organization positions
Preceded by Alliance founded	President of the Alliance for Retired Americans; 2001–2009	Succeeded by Barbara Easterling
