= William W. Winpisinger =

American labor leader (1924–1997)

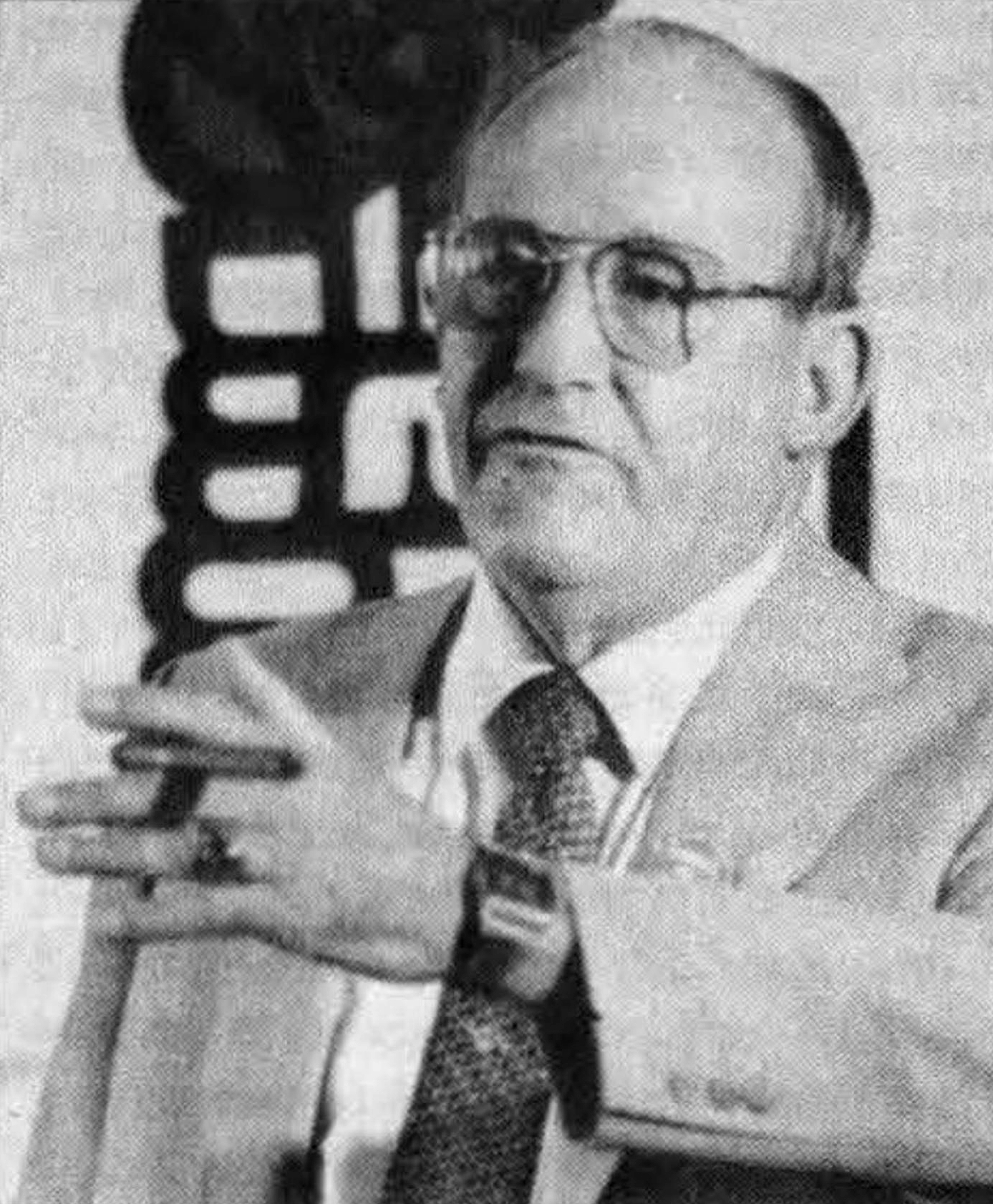
Winpisinger at a Democratic Socialists of America caucus held at the 1980 DNC

William Wayne Winpisinger (December 10, 1924 – December 11, 1997) was the eleventh International President of the million-member International Association of Machinists and Aerospace Workers from 1977 until his retirement in 1989. Well-read in the economics, history and mission of the American labor movement, he was a forceful and articulate spokesman for organized labor and was often invited to testify before House and Senate committees on legislation affecting working people. During his twelve years as IAM President, he substantially expanded the union's human rights, community services, job safety, public relations and organizing programs.

== Early life ==
"Wimpy," as he was known, was born in Cleveland, Ohio, the son of Joseph "Joe Winnie" Winpisinger, a journeyman printer with The Plain Dealer, and Edith (Knodel) Winpisinger. He was President of his freshman class at John Marshall High School on Cleveland's West Side, but he left high school before graduating. He enlisted in the U.S. Naval Reserve on October 14, 1942. Testing by the Navy revealed leadership potential, and he was assigned to the Navy V-12 Program, designed to provide a college-level education to potential junior officers. He left the program after several months and was transferred to the USS LST 310 where he served as a motor mechanics mate. He saw action as a crew member of the LST 310 in the invasion of Sicily and the D-Day invasion at Normandy, where the ship landed troops on Easy Green beach.

Discharged from the Naval Reserve on July 15, 1947, Winpisinger returned to Cleveland where he worked as a "gypsy mechanic", repairing automobile transmissions at local service stations. He married Pearl Foster (born January 15, 1927, in Cleveland, Ohio) on July 16, 1946.

== Union career ==
He secured a job as a mechanic at Lake Buick, a dealership on Lavern Avenue on Cleveland's West Side, and on July 15, 1947, obligated to Local Lodge 1363 of the International Association of Machinists and Aerospace Workers. Within six months he was elected shop steward by his fellow union members. He was elected Recording Secretary of Local Lodge 1363 in 1948, and President of the Lodge in 1949.

Union officials quickly recognized Winpisinger's talent and appointed him to the National Field Staff, as a Special Representative, in 1951, and assigned him to organizing tasks in Ohio, Michigan and Pennsylvania. IAM President Al Hayes promoted him to a position in Washington, D.C. in 1955 to work on a joint organizing program with the International Brotherhood of Teamsters. That assignment ended in 1957, when the Teamsters were expelled from the AFL–CIO.

Winpisinger was then assigned to a variety of jobs throughout the union, including servicing members in the automotive, airline and brewery industries. He negotiated the union's first collective bargaining agreement with Continental Airlines in 1961, and was appointed Automotive Coordinator in 1965, overseeing the contracts of more than 100,000 auto mechanics. He was appointed co-chair of the IAM Pension Fund in May, 1965.

He was elected General Vice President for Transportation on August 1, 1967, giving him a seat on the union's Executive Council. He was promoted to the position of Resident Vice President (Chief of Staff to the International President) in 1972.

Winpisinger became International President of the IAM on July 1, 1977. He held his first staff meeting at one minute past midnight, demonstrating to the staff that "A new day has dawned at the IAM." Becoming SANE (anti-nuclear weapons proliferation) Co-Chairman in 1979, he authored a peacetime conversion pamphlet "More Jobs - Converting to a Peacetime Economy," January 24, 1978, a provocative document sent to every IAM member's home.

As President of the IAM, Winpisinger secured a seat on the Executive Board of the AFL–CIO, where he clashed frequently with the organization's president, George Meany. Winpisinger called for Meany to step down, saying: "The best thing that could happen to the American Labor Movement would be for George Meany to drop dead."

In his three terms as IAM President, Winpisinger was described in many ways - flamboyant, aggressive, radical, blunt and outspoken. In the first few months of his term as president he displayed those characteristics when he publicly called for the retirement or resignation of then president of the AFL–CIO, George Meany, because, in Winpisinger's estimation, an 83-year-old labor leader was too old to lead a workforce with an average age in its thirties.

Winpisinger also gained national recognition when during the energy crisis of 1981. His union filed a lawsuit against the OPEC oil cartel, charging them with artificial price fixing in the price of petroleum. That, in turn, Winpisinger pointed out, had a negative impact on the American economy, causing production interruptions and layoffs, denying his members their right to work. And, he concluded, if the United States government wouldn't do anything about it, his union, as a representative of American workers, would.

Because of his unique leadership style, Winpisinger was sought out by the media. In 1979, he was the subject of a Columbia Broadcasting System (CBS) 60 Minutes television feature proclaiming, "Wimpy, a New Breed of Labor Leader."

A lifelong auto racing fan, Winpisinger was instrumental in the creation of Machinists Union Racing, which operated from 1981 to 1990 under the leadership of IAM national automotive coordinator Andy Kenopensky.

Philosophically he was considered to be to the left of many of his colleagues in organized labor. He was especially concerned about labor's poor public image and saw a need for more imaginative leadership in communicating the labor movement's mission and accomplishments. According to Winpisinger that mission was to serve the nation's oppressed and underprivileged.

Winpisinger was active in many efforts promoting cooperation between labor, management and government. He served as a member of the AFL–CIO Executive Council; a member of the Finance Committee of the Democratic National Committee; co-chair of the Collective Bargaining and Group Relations Institute; a trustee of the National Planning Association; President of the Citizen/Labor Energy Coalition; a member of the Board of Governors of the National Space Institute; a board member of the Americans for Democratic Action; a board member of the Democratic Socialists of America; a member of the Executive Committee of the International Metalworkers' Federation; and an Executive Board member of International Guiding Eyes.

Winpisinger and his wife, Pearl, lived in Silver Spring, Maryland, where they raised their five children. After his retirement, they moved to Columbia, Maryland, where they lived until his death. He died of cancer on December 11, the day after his 73rd birthday, at the Howard County Memorial Hospital in Columbia, Maryland. He left 5 children and 8 grandchildren.

== Honors ==
Winpisinger was awarded honorary degrees from several universities, including a Doctor of Laws from Wilmington College, Wilmington, Ohio. In 1981 the IAMAW opened up the William W. Winpisinger Education and Technology Center at Placid Harbor in Hollywood, Maryland.

Winpisinger showed his readiness to push the boundaries of what many considered appropriate behavior for trade union leaders in one other important area. He visited the Soviet Union three times, twice during his tenure as IAM president (1983 and 1986) and again in 1989, just after his retirement. He met with Soviet leader Mikhail Gorbachev and engaged in at least one face to face meeting and question and answer session with Soviet factory workers. He was positive and hopeful about the changes taking place in the Soviet Union and critical of others, including other union leaders, who made negative comments about the USSR but never visited.

== Notes ==
Trade union offices
Preceded by Floyd E. Smith	President of the International Association of Machinists and Aerospace Workers; 1977–1989	Succeeded by George Kourpias
