= Maurice Hutcheson =

American labor leader

Maurice Albert Hutcheson (May 7, 1897 – January 9, 1983) was a carpenter and an American labor leader. He was president of the United Brotherhood of Carpenters and Joiners of America from 1952 to 1972.

He was nicknamed "Maurice the Silent" for his taciturn nature and ability to sit silently through long meetings or heated debates.

== Early life ==
He was born in Saginaw County, Michigan, to William Hutcheson and his wife Bessie Mae (King). He was educated in public schools. The Hutcheson family moved to Indianapolis, Indiana in 1913 when William Hutcheson (his father) was elected president of the Carpenters' union. The younger Hutcheson apprenticed as a carpenter in 1914 and served in the United States Navy in World War I. After the war, he returned to carpentry. He was appointed a financial auditor for the international union in 1928, and was elected an international vice president in 1938. After his father's death, Maurice was elected president.

== Tenure as president ==
Hutcheson immediately withdrew the Carpenters from the American Federation of Labor (AFL) when, shortly after his election, the AFL signed a no-raid agreement with the Congress of Industrial Organizations (CIO). However, he re-affiliated the union just three weeks later.

He was elected a vice president of the AFL in 1953 and served on the federation's executive council. After the merger of the AFL and CIO in 1955, he was elected a vice president of the merged organization as well.

In 1954, he signed a jurisdictional agreement with the International Association of Machinists and Aerospace Workers, ending a 40-year dispute. In 1957, he was cited for contempt of Congress for refusing to appear before the Permanent Subcommittee on Investigations of the U.S. Senate Committee on Government Operations led by Senator John L. McClellan and answer questions about labor racketeering.

Hutcheson was convicted of contempt of Congress in May 1960 and sentenced to six months in prison. The conviction was upheld by the United States Supreme Court. A federal district court judge converted the sentence to two years of probation in 1964. Hutcheson was later pardoned by President Lyndon B. Johnson.

Although he was critical of Teamsters president Jimmy Hoffa for permitting his union to be dominated by organized crime, Hutcheson voted against the resolution ejecting the union sponsored by AFL-CIO president George Meany in 1957. The resolution passed over his objection.

In 1958, Hutcheson and two Carpenters union officials were accused of bribing an Indiana state official to obtain advance notice of the nature and location of future highway projects. Law enforcement officials said Hutcheson and the others had made an $81,000 profit by buying the land on which a highway was to be built and then selling it to the state. All three men turned their profits over to the state and were convicted in 1960. The Indiana Supreme Court unanimously threw out the convictions in 1963, holding that there were no grounds for a conspiracy conviction.

The conviction nearly led to Hutcheson's removal from the AFL-CIO's Executive Council, but Meany—whom Hutcheson had strongly supported through the years—blocked the removal when Hutcheson threatened to pull his union from the federation.

== End of his life ==
After his retirement, he lived in Milan, Indiana. Shortly before his death, he moved to Florida.

Maurice Hutcheson died in Lakeland, Florida. Hutcheson's wife, the former Ethel Hyatt, died in 1977. The couple had no children.

== See also ==
- List of people pardoned or granted clemency by the president of the United States

Trade union offices
Preceded by William Hutcheson	President, United Brotherhood of Carpenters and Joiners of America; 1952–1972	Succeeded by William Sidell
Preceded by Position recreated	Fourteenth Vice-President of the American Federation of Labor; 1953–1954	Succeeded by Al J. Hayes
Preceded by Dave Beck	Thirteenth Vice-President of the American Federation of Labor; 1954–1955	Succeeded by Federation merged
