= Patrick J. Campbell =

American labor leader

Patrick J. Campbell (July 22, 1918 – February 21, 1998) was a carpenter and an American labor leader. He was president of the United Brotherhood of Carpenters and Joiners of America from November 1, 1982, to February 1988.

Campbell was born in 1918 in New York City to Peter and Mary Campbell. His father was a city mass transit employee. He attended public schools. After graduation, he apprenticed as a carpenter.

He married Catherine Keane in May 1940. The couple had two sons, Patrick and Kevin, and a daughter, Cynthia.

He served in the United States Army Air Forces during World War II, rising to the rank of staff sergeant and seeing combat action in the Pacific theater.

After the war, he moved to Rockland County, New York, and joined Carpenters Local 964. He was elected president of the local in 1954.

In 1955, he was hired by the international union as an organizer. In 1957, the international promoted him to staff representative, and he serviced contracts in Rockland and three nearby counties.

In 1966, he was appointed assistant to the president of the Carpenters, Maurice Hutcheson, and elected a vice president of the union.

He was elected to the general executive board of the 1st District of the Carpenters in 1969, and resigned his position as local president the same year.

In 1970, Campbell was elected a vice president the New York State AFL-CIO and vice president of the New York State Building Trades Council.

In 1974, he was elected second vice president of the international union. He was elected first vice president in 1980.

Carpenters president William Konyha resigned unexpectedly effective October 31, 1982. Campbell was elected to succeed him.

In 1983, Campbell initiated a boycott of the Louisiana-Pacific Corporation, accusing the company of failing to pay fair wages to 1,500 lumber workers represented by the union. The company broke from an industry-wide bargaining group, which had agreed to an 8.5 percent wage hike over three years. The action triggered a strike on June 24, 1983. But the company outlasted the union, and the Carpenters affiliate at Louisiana-Pacific disbanded.

Between 1985 and 1986, Campbell allegedly authorized six construction loans totaling more than $95 million. The loans were made from the union's $200 million reserve fund. According to press reports, Campbell made the loans based on advice from Empire Contract Consulting Inc., a New York firm that also serviced and monitored the loans. Developers began to experience trouble repaying the loans in 1987, but Empire Contract Consulting did not make the union aware of the problems until 1989.

Campbell resigned as president of the Carpenters in mid-term in February 1988 due to ill health. He was succeeded as president by Sigurd Lucassen.

Lucassen revealed the problems with the loans in September 1989.

Patrick Campbell died on February 21, 1998, in Palm City, Florida.

== Notes ==
Trade union offices
Preceded by William Konyha	President, United Brotherhood of Carpenters and Joiners of America; November 1, 1982 – February 1988	Succeeded by Sigurd Lucassen
Preceded by Joyce D. Miller	AFL-CIO delegate to the Trades Union Congress; 1984	Succeeded by Lynn R. Williams
