= Al J. Hayes =

American labor union leader

Albert John Hayes (February 14, 1900 – August 20, 1981) was an American labor union leader.

Born in Milwaukee, Hayes completed an apprenticeship as a machinist in the railroad shops. In 1917, he joined the International Association of Machinists. He rose to become president of his union local, then in 1934 began working full-time as a representative for the Grand Lodge.

Hayes served on the Chicago War Labor Board during World War II. In 1945, he was elected as a vice-president of the union, and then in 1949 as its president. As leader of the union, he convinced it to reaffiliate to the American Federation of Labor (AFL). He proposed that arbitration should be compulsory in labor disputes, something opposed by many labor unionists. Under his leadership, the union's membership grew from 672,000 to just under 900,000.

In 1950, he joined the National Security Board, the advisory committee of the Economic Stabilization Agency, and the Labor-Management Advisory Committee. The following year, he left those bodies, to become an assistant to the United States Assistant Secretary of Defense, and also chair of the President's Commission on the Health Needs of the Nation.

In 1953, Hayes was elected as a vice-president of the AFL. In 1955, the federation became part of the new AFL-CIO, with Hayes continuing as a vice-president. He retired in 1965, and died in 1981.

Trade union offices
| Preceded by Harvey W. Brown | President of the International Association of Machinists; 1949–1965 | Succeeded by P. L. Siemiller |
| Preceded by New position | Fifteenth Vice-President of the American Federation of Labor; 1953–1954 | Succeeded by J. Scott Milne |
| Preceded by Maurice Hutcheson | Fourteenth Vice-President of the American Federation of Labor; 1954–1955 | Succeeded by Federation merged |
