= League of Independent Workers of the San Joaquin Valley =

Workers Union in California

- Founded: 2004
- Location: United States of America
- Affiliations: International Association of Machinists

The League of Independent Workers of the San Joaquin Valley is a union in the U.S. state of California.

== Founding ==
Between 2002 and 2005, the cost of living in Livingston, California, increased substantially. In particular, house prices doubled and rents went up.

In 2003, workers at the Foster Farms poultry plants around Livingston voted to leave the United Food and Commercial Workers Union, Local 1288.

In 2004, the workers organized the League and voted to be represented by it.

In 2005, the League negotiated with Foster Farms. The League proposed a union shop contract with substantial pay increases; Foster Farms proposed an open shop contract with nominal pay increases. The League affiliated with the International Association of Machinists. Foster Farms refused to recognize the League's affiliation with the IAM. A three-day strike occurred in October 2005.

In 2006, Foster Farms and the League agreed to an open shop contract with nominal pay increases. The League's members ratified the contract on October 29, 2006.

== See also ==
- Foster Farms
- International Association of Machinists
- Livingston, California

== Sources ==
- Adam Ashton. "New union at Foster Farms wins its election." Merced Sun-Star, November 5, 2004. https://web.archive.org/web/20041109072057/http://www.modbee.com/ag/story/9383527p-10291521c.html
- Chris Collins. "Today seen as possible start of protest by workers." Merced Sun-Star, October 25, 2005. http://www.mercedsun-star.com/local/story/11394459p-12140487c.html
- Chris Collins. "Strikers to lay down signs: Stop-and-start protest designed to confound Foster Farms." Merced Sun-Star, October 29, 2005. http://www.mercedsun-star.com/local/story/11413965p-12158083c.html
- Scott Jason. "Union member drive under way at Foster Farms plant." Merced Sun-Star, November 23, 2006. http://www.modbee.com/local/story/13045116p-13702175c.html
