= United Brotherhood of Carpenters Local Union 608 =

UBC Local Union 608
- The United Brotherhood of Carpenters and Joiners of America - Local Union 608
- Merged into: UBC Local 157
- Founded: January 18, 1918
- Dissolved: December 14, 2010
- Location: United States
- Members: 7,500 (2007)
- Key people: Tommy McGonnigle, President (Final Officer)
- Affiliations: N.Y.C. District Council of Carpenters
- Website: www.local608.org

United Brotherhood of Carpenters - Local Union 608 is currently affiliated with the N.Y.C. District Council of Carpenters and the United Brotherhood of Carpenters and Joiners of America. It was granted a charter on January 18, 1918. Located in New York City, New York, the jurisdiction of the Local covers the western half of Manhattan, Harlem and the Bronx borough. It has approximately 7500 members. Local Union 608 no longer exists.

== History ==
Often referred to as the Irish Local because of the history of Irish Leadership and the majority of the membership is of Irish descent, it has struggled through the years to maintain its independence. Many of its members have been trained in several areas of Carpentry, including Drywall, Finish Work, Concrete, Scaffolding and others. Local Union 608 officially disbanded after 92 years, December 14, 2010.

== Objective ==
- To organize and unionize non-union carpenter contractors in the NYC Area.
- To train new apprentices in the craft of Carpentry

== Local 17 ==
After some financial improprieties at Local Union 17 (Bronx), it was merged into Local Union 608 after a brief trusteeship in 1999. The jurisdiction of the Bronx is often referred to as Local 608 North

== Leadership ==
From the period of 2009 forward, the local has had several leaders serve as President of the local. Unfortunately, these leaders have been removed by either the General President, or the Federally appointed Review Officer for various reasons. This has demoralized the membership and has prevented the local from moving forward, as their attention is pointed inward, and the membership is splintered into competing factions.

== Local 157 ==
After a period of time during 2009 - 2010, the International United Brotherhood of Carpenters decided to dissolve the local on December 14, 2010, and merge the members into Local Union 157, which currently covers the East Side of Manhattan. At a future date, another local may be created in Manhattan to take over the jurisdiction of Interior Systems. This has brought the membership of Local 157 into the 10,000 member range.

== Executive leadership ==
President

- December 7, 2010 - December 14, 2010 (7 days) Tommy McGonnigle
- September 2010 - November 2010 Mike Murphy
- August 2010 - September 2010 John Daly
- 2010-August 2010 - Joe Firth
- 2009-2010 Martin Devereaux
- 2000-2009 John Greaney
- 1998-2000 Mike Forde
- 1994-1998 Patrick J. Harvey
- 1980-1994 Paschal McGuinness
- 1960-1980 John J O'Connor

== Mafia influence ==
It has been long reported that the leadership has been under Mafia Influence and it has been proven on many occasions
