= P. L. Siemiller =

American labor union leader

Paul LeRoy "Roy" Siemiller (September 4, 1904 – June 2, 1993) was an American labor union leader.

Born in Gothenburg, Nebraska, Siemiller grew up in California, Arkansas, and then St. Cloud, Florida. He then traveled to undertake short-term work until he settled in Atlanta and completed an apprenticeship as a machinist. He joined the International Association of Machinists (IAM) in 1929, while working in Port Arthur, Texas, then moved to Harrison, Arkansas to work for the Missouri and Northern Arkansas Railroad.

Siemiller became financial secretary and then president of his local union. In 1937, he began working full-time for the international union, organizing workers on the Pennsylvania Railroad. During World War II, he served on the Sixth Regional War Labor Board. He was the American Federation of Labor delegate to the International Labour Organization in 1947, and in 1948, he was elected as a vice-president and executive board member of the IAM. For six months in 1951, he served as director of the manpower division of the Defense Transport Administration.

In 1965, Siemiller was elected as president of the IAM. As leader of the union, he traveled widely, and led a recruitment drive which added 100,000 members to the union. In 1966, he led a major airline strike, which led to 5% pay increases and improvements in working conditions. He also served as a vice-president of the AFL-CIO, and in 1966 was co-chair of the American Foundation on Automation and Unemployment. He retired from his union posts in 1969, becoming vice-president for labor relations of the National Alliance of Businessmen. He retired fully in 1974, and died of cancer in 1993.

Trade union offices
Preceded by Al J. Hayes	President of the International Association of Machinists and Aerospace Workers; 1965–1969	Succeeded by Floyd E. Smith
