= George E. Browne =

George E(dwin) Browne was an American labor union leader.

Browne was active in the International Alliance of Theatrical Stage Employees (IATSE), becoming business agent of its Stagehands Local No. 2, based in Chicago. In the 1920s, he won election as vice-president of the international union. In 1932, he stood unsuccessfully for the post of president, afterwards standing down as vice-president. He stood for the presidency again in 1934, winning the post without facing a contest. He was also elected as a vice-president of the American Federation of Labor.

In 1941, Browne was tried and convicted with co-conspirator Willie Bioff, of extortion of $1.2 million from Hollywood film studio producers after threatening them with labor strikes on behalf of the Chicago Outfit.

Browne registered for the draft in 1942 while he was serving his sentence at the federal penitentiary at Sandstone, MN. The registration gave his occupation as "farmer" and reports he had been living in Woodstock, IL prior to his incarceration.

Browne was sentenced to eight years in prison. However, both he and Bioff assisted the government in a trial of other members of the Outfit, and as a result, they were granted parole in 1944. That year, he was expelled from the IATSE.

In 1947, Paramount Pictures entered a motion to recover $100,000 from Browne, but dropped the case after its attorneys were unable to locate Browne. . In the 1950 census, he was living with his wife and twin daughters in Dubuque, IA

Browne died at St Luke’s Hospital, Davenport, IA on June 14, 1956

His death certificate states he spent the last two years of his life in Davenport where he had lived in an apartment over a tavern. The cause of death was "nephritis with uremia, complicated by decompensated atherosclerotic heart disease."

He is buried at Union Cemetery, St. Charles, IL

Trade union offices
Preceded by William C. Elliot	President of the International Alliance of Theatrical Stage Employees; 1934–1941	Succeeded by Richard F. Walsh
Preceded by Edward J. Gainor	Fourteenth Vice-President of the American Federation of Labor; 1936–1941	Succeeded by Harvey W. Brown
Preceded by William D. Mahon	Twelfth Vice-President of the American Federation of Labor; 1941	Succeeded by Harvey W. Brown
