= Boomer Jones =

US radio program

- Genre: Radio Drama
- Running time: 30 minutes.
- Country of origin: United States
- Language: English
- Syndicates: Mutual Network
- Starring: William Holden, Marie McDonald, Brian Donlevy
- Written by: Morton Wishengrad
- Directed by: Mel Ferrer
- Original release: September 3, 1950
- No. of episodes: 1
- Sponsored by: International Association of Machinists

Boomer Jones was a 1950 radio show produced by the International Association of Machinists and Aerospace Workers (IAM) which first aired coast to coast on the Mutual Network on September 3, 1950, the day before Labor Day. The show lasted approximately 30 minutes and was followed by a speech from Al Hayes, who was, at the time, the International President of the IAM.

Boomer Jones was written by Morton Wishengrad and directed by Mel Ferrer. Major roles were played by three of the top Hollywood stars of the time: William Holden, Marie McDonald, and Brian Donlevy who all donated their time and talent.

The radio program was the first of its kind ever attempted by a trade union and told the story of the old-time "boomers" (union organizers) who helped build one of the largest industrial trade unions in American history. Production of Boomer Jones required eight months of research into the early years of the IAM to make the final production as accurate as possible.
