= Tom Short (unionist) =

Thomas C. Short (born 1949) is a former American labor union leader.

Born in Cleveland, Short became a stagehand for the Cleveland Symphony Orchestra. In 1968, he followed his father and grandfather in joining the International Alliance of Theatrical Stage Employees. In 1975, he was charged with assaulting the reporter Jay Bacchus when he crossed a picket line, for which he was fined $800. In 1980, he was indicted, along with his father, accused of embezzling union funds, but the charges were dropped. He was elected as an international vice-president of the union in 1988, and then in 1993 became the union's general secretary-treasurer. He was elected as president of the union in 1994.

As leader of the union, Short signed a large number of agreements. He set up a Political Action Committee, and persuaded the United Scenic Artists to reaffiliate to the union. He also introduced the Individual Retirement Plan for union members on the West Coast. The LA Times described him as "often is more ally than adversary to management". Under his leadership, membership of the union increased by more than 50%. In addition, he was elected as a vice-president of the AFL-CIO.

Short retired in 2008.

Trade union offices
Preceded by James J. Riley	General Secretary-Treasurer of the International Alliance of Theatrical Stage Employees; 1993–1994	Succeeded by Michael W. Proscia
Preceded by Alfred W. Di Tolla	President of the International Alliance of Theatrical Stage Employees; 1994–2008	Succeeded by Matthew Loeb
