= Harvey W. Brown =

American labor union leader

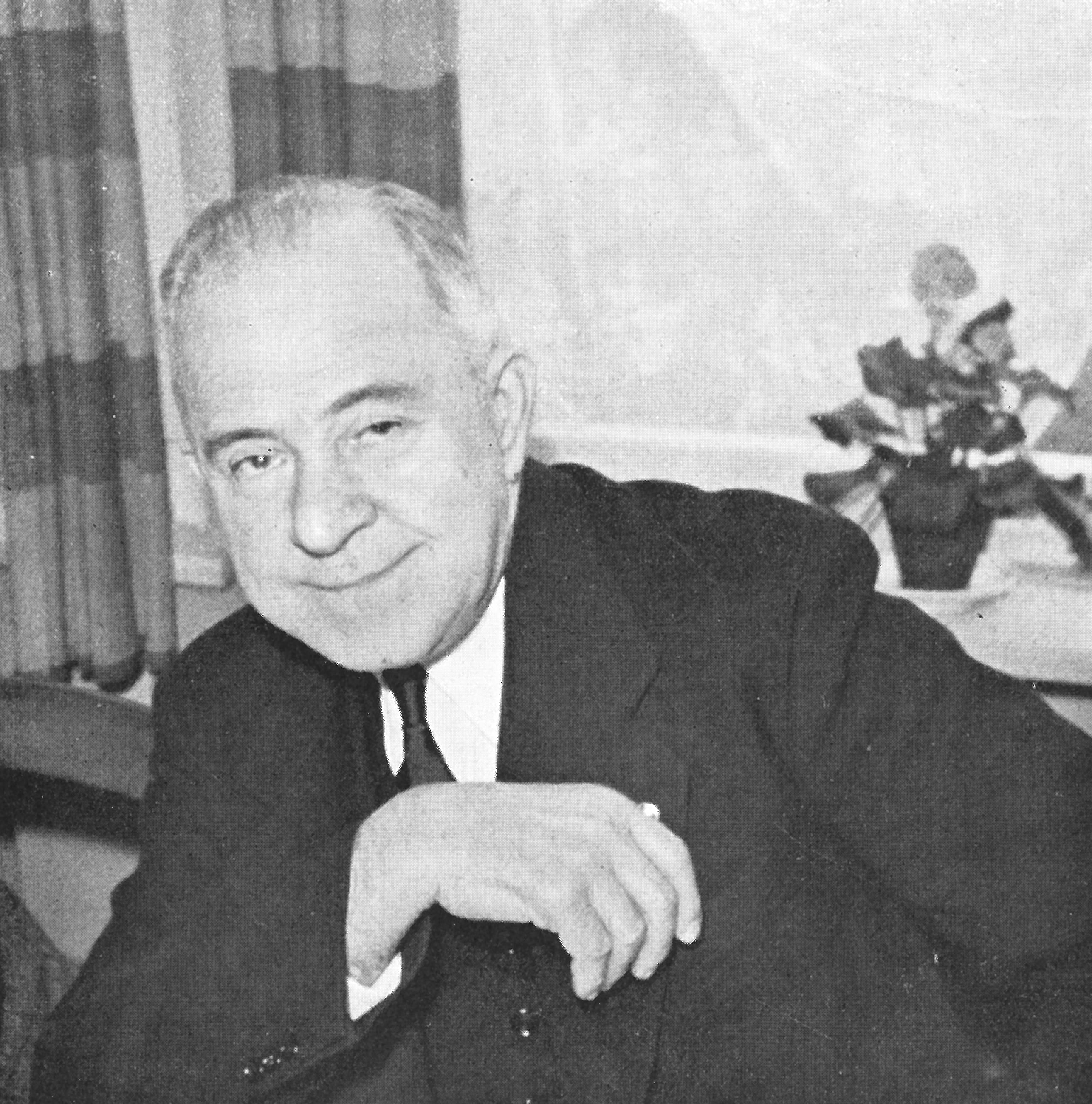
- Born: Harvey Winfield Brown; October 28, 1883; Schuylkill, Pennsylvania
- Died: September 4, 1956 (aged 72)
- Occupation: Labor leader

Harvey Winfield Brown (October 28, 1883 – September 4, 1956) was an American labor union leader.

Born in Schuylkill, Pennsylvania, Brown was educated in Pottsville, Pennsylvania, then completed an apprenticeship as a machinist. He then worked making naval guns. In 1905, he joined the International Association of Machinists (IAM), and from 1911 he worked full-time for the union. He was initially business agent for the union's Wilkes-Barre local, then in 1915 became an organizer for the international union. In 1916, he moved to become business agent for the union's Newark, New Jersey local.

In 1921, Brown was elected as one of the IAM's vice-presidents. In 1938, the IAM's president, Arthur O. Wharton, became ill, and Brown was appointed as acting president. In 1940, he was elected as Wharton's successor. Under his leadership, the IAM grew rapidly, and became an industrial union, supplemented its members in the railroad sector with others in airframe and general manufacturing. He also centralized the union, and engaged in lengthy conflicts with Emmet Davision, the IAM's secretary-treasurer, and with both the United Brotherhood of Carpenters and Joiners of America and the International Union of Operating Engineers. He served as a vice-president of the American Federation of Labor (AFL), but later disaffiliated the IAM from the AFL, objecting to the federation's decisions in jurisdictional disputes.

Brown stood down as president of the IAM in 1949, becoming director of the office of labor affairs of the United States High Commission in Germany. He retired in 1951.

Trade union offices
Preceded by Arthur O. Wharton	President of the International Association of Machinists; 1940–1948	Succeeded by Al J. Hayes
Preceded by George E. Browne	Fourteenth Vice-President of the American Federation of Labor; 1941–1942	Succeeded by Position abolished
Preceded by George E. Browne	Twelfth Vice-President of the American Federation of Labor; 1942–1943	Succeeded by William C. Birthright
Preceded by Edward Flore	Eleventh Vice-President of the American Federation of Labor; 1943–1945	Succeeded by William C. Doherty
