= Robert Martinez Jr. =

Labor leader

Robert "Bob" Martinez is an American labor union leader.

Martinez served in the United States Navy, then worked as an aircraft assembler for Lockheed Martin in Fort Worth. In 1980, he joined the International Association of Machinists and Aerospace Workers (IAMAW). He held various positions in his local union before, in 1995, moving to work full-time for the union, in its health and safety department.

In 1999, Martinez became the union's education representative for its southern territory. He became a special representative in 2002, and then a vice president and executive board member in 2003, with responsibility for the south. He was elected as the union's general vice president in 2013, and then as president in 2016. As leader of the union, he has removed several officers who he accused of being responsible for missing money.

Martinez also serves on the executive of the AFL-CIO, and as one of its vice-presidents. He is a member of the President's Export Council, and sits on the executive of IndustriALL.

Trade union offices
Preceded by Tom Buffenbarger	President of the International Association of Machinists and Aerospace Workers; 2016–present	Succeeded by Incumbent
