= Floyd E. Smith =

American labor union leader

Floyd Emery "Red" Smith (August 30, 1912 – February 27, 1989) was an American labor union leader.

Born in Quenemo, Kansas, Smith began working as a machinist at the Everstick Anchor Company in St. Louis when he was 17 years old. He was laid off during the Great Depression, and found work as a bricklayer, joining the International Union of Bricklayers and Allied Craftworkers. In 1942, he moved to Las Vegas, and became president of his local union. For 18 months, he served as Nevada's Deputy Labor Commissioner.

In 1945, Smith moved to Long Beach, California, where he joined the International Association of Machinists (IAM). He held full-time posts in his local union, and was also active in the Democratic Party. He began working for the international union in 1952, and then in 1961 he was elected as the union's general vice president, based in Cleveland. In 1969, he was elected as president of the IAM.

Smith also served as a vice-president of the AFL-CIO, and on government committees including the United States Pay Board. He retired in 1977, and died in 1989.

Trade union offices
Preceded by P. L. Siemiller	President of the International Association of Machinists and Aerospace Workers; 1969–1977	Succeeded by William W. Winpisinger
