= N.Y.C. District Council of Carpenters =

American trade union

NYC District Council of Carpenters and Joiners of America
- Carpenters District Council of New York City and Vicinity

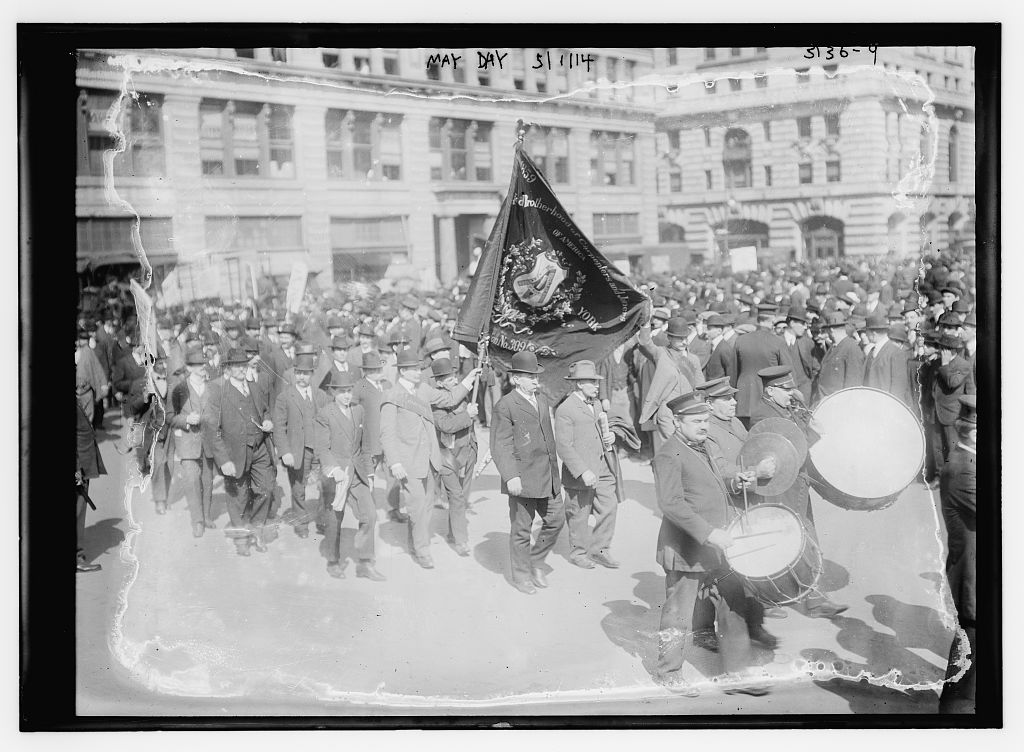
- 1914 May Day rally in Union Square
- Founded: 1900
- Location: New York City
- Members: 23,000
- Key people: Joseph Gieger, EST
- Affiliations: United Brotherhood of Carpenters and Joiners of America
- Website: www.nycdistrictcouncil.com

The N.Y.C. District Council of Carpenters maintains jurisdiction over carpentry, dock builder, timber man, millwright, floorcovering, specialty shops and exhibition work in the New York City area.

As of 2015 the council oversees 7 member locals: 157, 740, 926, 45, 1556, 2287 and 2790.

== Locals ==
Member locals include:

- Local 20 (Staten Island) – carpenters
- * Local 17 (Bronx) – carpenters, dissolved 2000 and members transferred to Local 608
- Local 45 (Queens) – carpenters
- * Local 135 (Manhattan Upper East Side) – carpenters, dissolved 2000 and members transferred to new Local 157
- Local 157 (Downtown and East Side of Manhattan) – carpenters
- * Local 257 (Manhattan Lower East Side) – carpenters; dissolved 2000 and members transferred to new Local 157
- Local 348 (Queens) – carpenters
- * Local 608 – dissolved 2007 and members transferred to Local 157
- Local 740 (greater NY) – millwright and machinery erectors
- Local 926 (Brooklyn) – carpenters
- Local 1556 (greater NY & NJ) – timbermen and dockbuilders
- Local 1536 (Midtown Manhattan) – timbermen; dissolved 2010, combined with dockbuilders to form local 1556
- * Local 2163 (Manhattan, Upper West Side) – carpenters, dissolved 1982 and members transferred to Local 608
- Local 2287 (New York City) – resilient floor covers
- Local 2790 (New York City & vicinity) – shop & industrial

== Leadership ==
The most senior position since 2000 has been the Office of the Executive Secretary Treasurer; prior to that, it was the Office of President.

- 12 February 2014 – present – Joseph Geiger – elected EST
- 15 May 2013 – 12 February 2014 – Steve McInnis – in role of President, appointed himself to be EST pro-tem until an election is held
- 1 January 2012 – 29 April 2013 – Michael Bilello – elected EST removed by Review Officer Dennis Walsh
- 10 August 2009 – 1 January 2012 - under trusteeship
- 2000 – 10 August 2009 – fired – Mike Forde – pleaded guilty to racketeering and bribery, July 28, 2010
- 1997–2000 – under UBC International trusteeship
- 1991–1996 – Frederick Devine – removed from office and later charged and convicted of embezzling union funds
- 1986–1991 – Paschal McGuinness – banned from holding office in NYC due to RICO Consent Decree
- 1982–1986 – under UBC International trusteeship
- 1978–1982 – Teddy Maritas – disappeared from the Throgs Neck Bridge, and never found, while on trial

== RICO case and disposition ==
In September 1990, the US Attorney for the Southern District of New York filed a RICO lawsuit against the District Council under the leadership of Paschal McGuinness. To settle the charges, the District Council eventually agreed to a consent decree in 1993. The consent decree installed oversight over the District Council operations via Judge Haight, and also brought in the office of the Investigations and Review Officer (the IRO), now called the Independent Investigator (the II).

Vital data about Genovese influence at the Javits Convention Center was supplied in reports issued by Kenneth Conboy, a former U.S. District Court Judge, who in the early 1990s was a court-appointed investigator of the carpenters' union, and his law partner, Geoffrey S. Berman.

When Walter Mack was the II, a good effort was made to remove corruption from the District Council operations. He was able to conduct several investigations which led to indictments, convictions, and procedural changes. Mack was forced to give up the position of II after several objections from the District Council – and being accused of being "too thorough" in his investigations. Some of his work is still being used to fight the corruption in the NYC Carpenters Union. Even though there is large oversight of the operations, corruption still exists and the leadership has again been under Federal Indictment. On June 3, 2010, Judge Haight appointed Dennis Walsh as the Review Officer, with increased powers and authority then previous investigators had. Judge Haight also removed himself from the case, as he had been moved out of the Southern District of New York court (Brooklyn) to Connecticut, and felt that the case will need a local judge.

=== Independent Investigator ===
The title of IRO or II has been held by the following individuals:

- 1990–1994: Michael Armstrong
- 1994–2003: Judge Kenneth Conboy
- 2003–2006: Walter Mack
- 2006–2010: William Callahan
- 2010–: Dennis Walsh (Review Officer)
