= Plumping =

Injecting meat with liquid

Plumping, also referred to as “enhancing” or “injecting,” is the process by which some poultry companies inject raw chicken meat with saltwater, chicken stock, seaweed extract, water and additives, or some combination thereof. The practice is most commonly used for fresh chicken and is also used in frozen poultry products, although other meats may also be plumped.

Poultry producers have injected chicken (and other meat) with saltwater solutions since the 1970s, claiming it makes for tastier, juicier meat. According to Kenneth McMillin, Professor of Meat Science at the Louisiana State University Agricultural Center in Baton Rouge, processors use multiple-needle injectors or vacuum-tumblers, that force the sodium solution into the muscle. Binding agents in the solution prevent the added salt and water from leaching out of the meat during transport, in grocery stores and during cooking.

== Controversy ==
=== Cost to consumers ===
Plumped chicken commonly contains 15% of its total weight in saltwater, but in some cases can contain as much as 30%. Since the price of chicken is based on weight, opponents of the practice estimate that shoppers could be paying up to an additional $1.70 per package for added saltwater, with the total annual cost to U.S. families estimated to be $2 billion in added weight charges.

=== Health effects ===
A serving of plumped chicken can contain between 200 mg and 500 mg of sodium per serving, which is more than 25% of the USDA's recommended daily sodium intake. Non-plumped chicken generally contains 45 to 70 mg per serving. In January 2010, the American Heart Association released new guidelines calling for all Americans to reduce their sodium intake to 1,500 mg (equivalent to 3.8 g of salt) from 2,300 mg. Previously, 1,500 mg was the recommended limit for higher-risk individuals only. In a current study, research has shown that reducing salt intake by three grams a day would decrease new cases of heart disease by one-third each year. This would reduce heart disease- related deaths by an estimated 100,000 annually, and save up to an estimated $24 billion in annual health costs, according to a study published by the New England Journal of Medicine. Dr. Bibbins-Domingo of UCSF, who led the study for the New England Journal of Medicine says, “Reducing salt intake could be as beneficial as quitting smoking, weight loss, and using cholesterol medication.”

Supporters of plumping cite that chicken with as much as 330 mg or less of sodium per serving is eligible for the American Heart Association’s seal of approval. However, the National Academy of Sciences Institute of Medicine recently conducted hearings exploring health risks associated with high salt intake, including testimony that addressed the practice of plumping. Health experts have weighed in on the issue. In a June 22, 2009 Los Angeles Times article, Marion Nestle, Professor of Nutrition, Food Studies and Public Health at New York University, noted that “the practice of saltwater plumping [adds] unnecessary salt to people’s diets, [and] it also increases the water weight of chicken.”

In the US, plumped meat was found to contain up to 210% increase in potassium, up to 75% increase in phosphate, compared with unplumped product. Knowledge of the practice of plumping and its consequences is important for those patients with chronic kidney disease who are trying to limit intake of potassium, phosphate, or both.

=== Labeling ===
Poultry producers, consumer advocacy groups and government officials are debating how plumped chicken products should be labeled. Under current USDA regulations, plumped chicken may still carry an “All-Natural” or “100% Natural” label. Plumped chicken is commonly labeled as natural and “enhanced with up to 15% chicken broth.” Critics of the practice argue that 70% of consumers think chicken labeled “natural” should not contain saltwater. Proponents of plumping say that their packaging already states that the chicken has been injected and that the enhanced chicken is sold to meet consumer demand.

In South Africa, controversy over individually quick-frozen chicken pieces being injected with up to 50% brine content, has resulted in government regulation requiring Individually Quick Frozen (IQF) chicken to be labeled with brine content. IQF chicken is a cheap staple food and manufacturers were accused of misleading the poor.

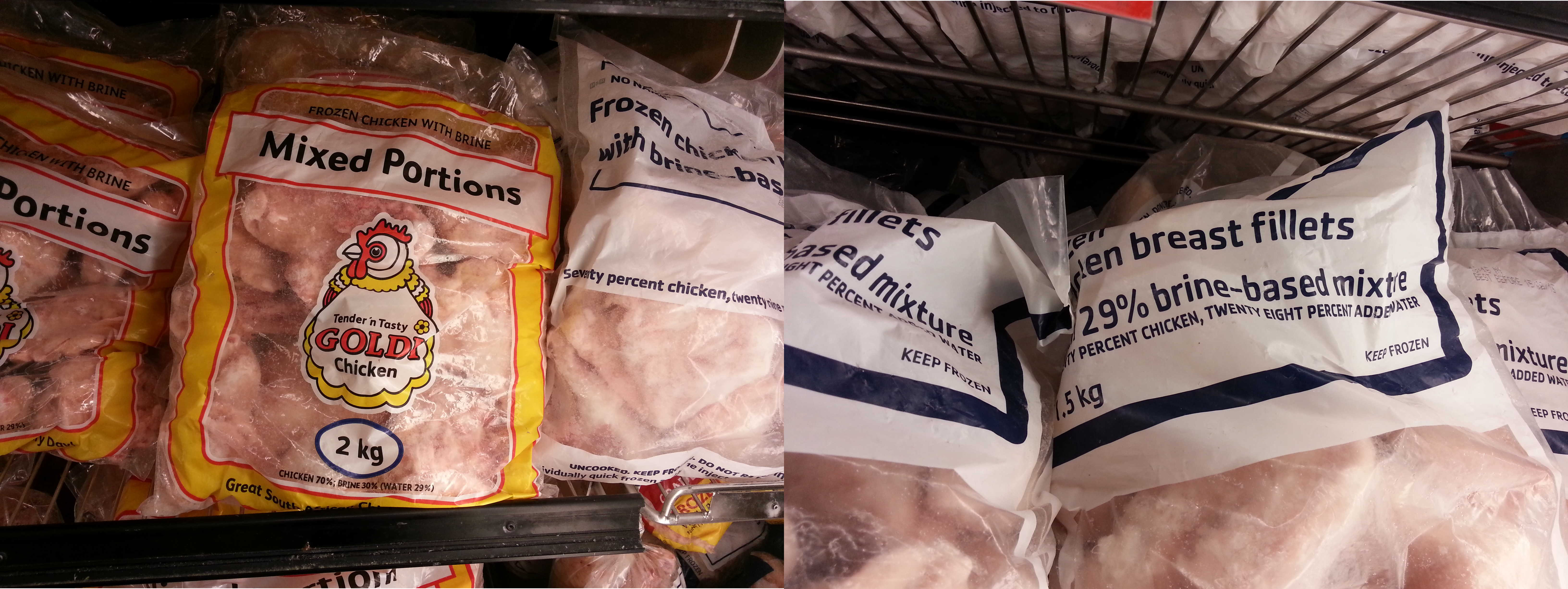
IQF chicken pieces in South Africa (from two different manufacturers), labeled with brine content. The labels consistently assert that the product is only 70% chicken.

== Media coverage ==
A number of U.S. poultry producers have addressed the practice in advertising campaigns. In March 2009, West Coast poultry producer Foster Farms and their advertising agency Goodby, Silverstein & Partners launched a campaign centered on "Say No To Plumping." TV commercials in English and Spanish featured the long-running Foster “Imposters” discussing the effects of plumping. The "Say No To Plumping" campaign won the 2010 Gold Effie Award in advertising. Sanderson Farms previously ran an advertising campaign on TV and outdoor billboards drawing consumer attention to saltwater injected chicken.

Plumping gained attention from the Wall Street Journal in early May 2009. The issue has also been covered in the Los Angeles Times, the Associated Press, the Baton Rouge Advocate, the Deseret News in Salt Lake City, Utah, and in Science Daily.
