= 2020 Bath shipbuilders' strike =

2020 labor strike in Bath, Maine

2020 Bath shipbuilders strike
- Date: June 22 – August 23, 2020 (2 months and 1 day)
- Location: Bath, Maine, United States
- Caused by: Labor contract disputes
- Methods: Picketing
- Result: Union agrees to a 3-year labor contract

Parties
International Association of Machinists and Aerospace Workers Local S6	Bath Iron Works

The 2020 Bath shipbuilders strike was a labor strike involving shipbuilders at Bath Iron Works in Bath, Maine, United States. The strike, which started June 22, involved 4,300 members of the International Association of Machinists and Aerospace Workers. The strike ended on August 23 with the approval of a new labor contract.

== Background ==
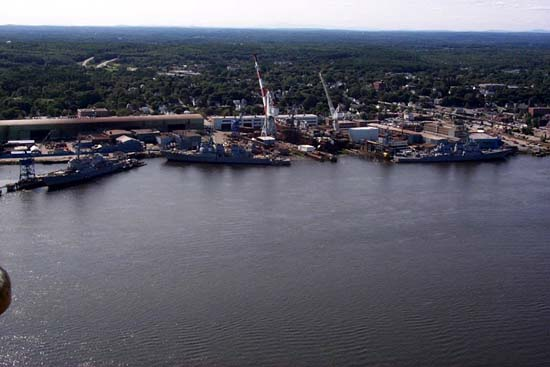
The shipyard of Bath Iron Works, c. 2000

Bath Iron Works (BIW) is a major shipyard and among the largest shipbuilders for the United States Navy. The shipyard, located in Bath, Maine, is a major employer for the region, with approximately 6,800 workers, of whom approximately 4,300 are members of Local S6 of the International Association of Machinists and Aerospace Workers (IAM).

In 2020, labor contract discussions between the union and company stalled as neither side could come to an agreement on the terms of the contract. The three-year contract proposed by the company would have included a 3% pay raise each year, but according to the union, there were over a dozen concessions that they took issue with. Primarily, union members took issue with changes in seniority and policy regarding the hiring of subcontractors. Previous efforts by the company to bring temporary workers to the shipyard were blocked by the union in 2015. On June 21, union members held a vote to approve a strike beginning at midnight, with 87% of the votes being to approve the strike. The strike is taking place during the COVID-19 pandemic, which has negatively affected operations at the shipyard, with production behind schedule by six months. The last time the union held a strike was in 2000, with the strike lasting 55 days.

== Course of the strike ==
Following the announcement of a strike on June 21, about a dozen union members left the union hall waving signs and cheering for the strike. Shortly after the announcement of the strike, Assistant Secretary of the Navy (Research, Development and Acquisition) James Geurtz said, “my expectation is both sides will work aggressively and with a sense of urgency so we can get these programs [executed].” U.S. Representative Jared Golden and Democratic Presidential nominee Joe Biden both expressed their support for the strikers.

On June 22, about 1,000 strikers picketed in front of the shipyard, with plans for smaller groups of people to continue picketing in four-hour blocks. Several shipyard workers from two other unions that were not on strike showed solidarity with the strikers by taking lunch breaks and vacation time. To help alleviate financial difficulties caused by the strike, union members will receive $150 per week from a union fund. Police reported 30 overnight noise complaints stemming from supporters honking their car horns to show support for the strike.

In early July, BIW announced that they would be hiring additional subcontractors to avoid falling further behind schedule with their projects. On July 7, the company began to temporarily lay off workers from non-striking union Local S7, citing a lack of work caused by the strike. That same week, union representatives from Local S6 began to meet with a Federal mediator, with company representatives expected to meet with the mediators the following week. On July 21, Local S6 President Chris Wiers criticized the company for hiring out-of-state contractors from several Southern states that were experiencing an increase in COVID-19 cases, such as Alabama and Mississippi. He alleged that this could lead to higher cases of infection in Bath and argued that BIW should "provide proof of testing with negative results for all out of state subcontractors immediately.” On July 25, President Robert Martinez Jr. of the IAM spoke to strikers outside the union hall, calling for strikers to remain strong and calling the strike "the largest strike in the United States of America right now.” On August 3, union and company representatives held their first meeting since June, where they agreed to points relating to company holidays and merit pay. On August 8, it was announced that the union and company had reached a tentative agreement to end the strike, with union members slated to vote on the agreement between August 21 and August 23. The 3-year labor contract was officially approved by union members on August 23, officially ending the strike, with union members returning to work the following day.

== See also ==
- COVID-19 pandemic in Maine
- Strikes during the COVID-19 pandemic
