= William Sidell =

American carpenter and labor leader

President, United Brotherhood of Carpenters and Joiners of America
- In office 1972–1979
- Preceded by: Maurice Hutcheson
- Succeeded by: William Konyha

William Sidell (30 May 1915 – 2 October 1994) was a carpenter and an American labor leader. He was president of the United Brotherhood of Carpenters and Joiners of America from 1973 to 1979.

He was born in Chicago to Samuel and Fannie (Freeman) Sidell. His father was a cabinetmaker. The family moved to Los Angeles, California, where Sidell graduated from public high school.

He apprenticed as a carpenter, and in 1939 joined the local in Los Angeles.

He married his wife, Frankie, in 1936 and the couple had three children.

In 1948, he was elected business manager of Local 721 in Los Angeles, and in 1957 secretary-treasurer of the Los Angeles District Council of Carpenters. He served as a trustee for the Carpenters Health and Welfare Fund for Southern California, and as a pension trustee for the Carpenters Pension Trust for Southern California.

In 1963, he was elected a vice president of the Carpenters union and served on the general executive board. In 1964, he was elected second vice president, and moved to first vice president in 1969.

After the retirement of president Maurice Hutcheson in 1972, he was elected president as his successor. The same year, he was elected a vice president of the AFL-CIO, and served on the executive committee of the Building and Construction Trades Department, AFL-CIO and chaired the AFL-CIO Committee on Housing (a group which lobbied Congress on housing policy).

President Gerald Ford appointed him to the President's Collective Bargaining Committee in Construction, but resigned in 1976 when Ford unexpectedly vetoed a common situs picketing bill.

He was considered a successor to AFL-CIO president George Meany. But when Meany hand-picked his assistant, Lane Kirkland, as his successor, Sidell and other contenders for the presidency withdrew.

== Post-retirement ==
After his retirement, President Jimmy Carter appointed Sidell to the Panama Canal Commission Supervisory Board in 1980.

In 1976, Sidell agreed to serve on a new AFL-CIO board which would settle jurisdictional disputes arising between affiliates.

Trade union offices
Preceded by Maurice Hutcheson	President of the United Brotherhood of Carpenters and Joiners of America; 1972 – 1979	Succeeded by William Konyha
Preceded by Max Greenberg; James Housewright	AFL-CIO delegate to the Trades Union Congress; 1975; With: Sol Stetin	Succeeded by George Hardy; Hal C. Davis
