= International Alliance of Theatrical Stage Employees =

North American labor union

- International Alliance of Theatrical Stage Employees, Moving Picture Technicians, Artists and Allied Crafts of the United States, Its Territories and Canada
- Abbreviation: IATSE
- Formation: July 17, 1893
- Type: Labor union
- Headquarters: New York City, US
- Members: 168,000 (2023)
- President: Matthew Loeb
- Secretary-treasurer: James B. Wood
- Affiliations: AFL-CIO; Canadian Labour Congress
- Website: iatse.net
- Formerly called: National Alliance of Theatrical Stage Employes

The International Alliance of Theatrical Stage Employees, Moving Picture Technicians, Artists and Allied Crafts of the United States, Its Territories and Canada, known as simply the International Alliance of Theatrical Stage Employees (IATSE or IA for short), is a North American labor union representing over 168,000 technicians, artisans, and craftspersons in the entertainment industry, including live theatre, motion picture and television production, broadcast and trade shows in the United States, its territories, and Canada. It was awarded the Tony Honors for Excellence in Theatre in 1993.

== Overview ==
IATSE was founded on July 17, 1893, when representatives of stagehands working in eleven cities met in New York and pledged to support each other's efforts to establish fair wages and working conditions for their members. IATSE has since evolved to embrace the development of new entertainment media, craft expansion, technological innovation and geographic growth.

Today, IATSE members work in all forms of live theater, motion picture and television production, trade shows and exhibitions, television broadcasting, and concerts as well as the equipment and construction shops that support all these areas of the entertainment industry. IATSE represents virtually all the behind-the-scenes workers in crafts ranging from motion picture animator to theater usher.

During a period when private sector union membership has been in sharp decline, IATSE has continued to grow. Since 1993, IATSE's membership has increased from 74,344 to 168,000 which it attributes to its willingness to adapt its structure to protect traditional jurisdiction and accommodate new crafts.

== History ==
=== 1886–1987 ===
In 1886, members of the Theatrical Protective Union of New York went on strike in New York City. After producers filled the positions of strikers with less skilled strikebreakers, actors refused to work due to sets falling apart. With the support of the actors behind the strikers, they succeeded in most of their requests.

In 1893, representatives of stagehands from eleven cities met in New York to discuss working conditions for their peers. They vowed to support each other in the effort to create an industry that would allow for fair wages and better working conditions. On June 17, 1893, the representatives officially formed the National Alliance of Theatrical Stage Employes. In 1895, "home rule" was established. The alliance defined home rule as "22 New York theatres for New York local members, Chicago theatres for Chicago (and so forth)... and no other members of locals allowed to work within the jurisdiction of other locals without (their) consent."

The Los Angeles Theatrical workers union (which had independently formed in 1891) joined NATSE in 1896. By 1898, the NATSE had welcomed two Canadian locals into the alliance: Montreal Local 56 and Toronto Local 58. In 1902, the alliance adopted "International" into its title.

In 1912, the union began a system that allowed individuals traveling with attractions to send basic information such as the size and length of time the local crews would be needed ahead to the next destination. This assured that there would be enough people to staff each theatre, and helped ensure these were union crews. The system is still in process today, and is referred to as the "yellow card system".

IATSE was quickly becoming the preeminent theatrical union in North America after the Canadian Department of Labour listed theatrical locals in New Brunswick, Quebec, Ontario, Manitoba, Calgary, Saskatchewan and Vancouver in 1928.

In June 1933, President Roosevelt signed legislation into law affecting all US workers: the National Recovery Act, creating the National Recovery Administration (NRA). The NRA's first mission was to create a uniform system of codes to cover all of industry in the United States. For months, the alliance participated in hearings to create an industrial code for the entertainment industry. Eventually, four different codes were established: Code of Fair Competition for the Motion Picture Industry; Code of Fair Competition for the Legitimate Full Length Dramatic and Musical Theatrical Industry; Code of Fair Competition for the Burlesque Theatrical Industry; and the Code of Fair Competition for the Motion Picture Laboratory Industry. The NRA shortened working hours to spread the work around, and set the first minimum wage level for stagehands. In 1938 the Fair Labor Standards Act was passed, including a provision that required studios to rearrange production schedules to fit the agreed-upon 44-hour work week (to be reduced to 40 over the following three years).

In 1940 the Canadian Picture Pioneers organization was formed, "dedicated to the support and well-being of all members of the motion picture industry in Canada".

==== Corruption in the early 20th century ====
During the early 20th century, organized crime gained influence over parts of IATSE in collusion with employers. In June 1934, IATSE held an election with only one person running. The election was rigged by the soon-to-be elected president George Browne. The other two opponents in the running suddenly dropped from the race after death threats were received. Willie Bioff, another Chicago gangster, was instantly elected Browne's "personal representative".

Later that year Bioff went to Hollywood on behalf of IATSE. He used violent threats to discuss a private and limited contract with studios. These contracts included weak contracts and high dues. The studios liked the protection against the union. In 1941, Bioff and other mobsters were charged with corruption leading to union members attempting to remove them from power in IATSE. However, The International Alliance of Theatrical Stage Employees remained corrupt and reverted to fraudulent negotiating practices. Some sources suggest that, in the later years, IATSE was "more interested in breaking strikes than winning them".

=== 1988–current ===
On November 6, 1996, the AICP (Association of Independent Commercial Producers, Inc.) and the IATSE signed the first-ever agreement between the two organizations. The agreement established the wages and working conditions applicable to motion picture and television production technicians and artisans employed in the production of television commercials, and was intended to recognize and address the special needs of the television commercial production process.

In 1998, the union's name was lengthened to the International Alliance of Theatrical Stage Employees, Moving Picture Technicians, Artists and Allied Crafts of the United States, Its Territories and Canada, while maintaining the existing acronym. In the same year, the five departments were established: Stagecraft, Motion Picture and Television Production, Organizing, Trade Show and Display Work, and Canadian Affairs. In 2011 the Communications Department was established, and in 2012, the Organizing Department was folded into the Stagecraft Department, and two new departments were established: Education and Training, and Broadcast.

In 1999, IATSE established the IATSE Political Action Committee, a federal political action committee designed to support candidates for federal office who promote the interests of the members of the IATSE and its locals and to support a federal legislative and administrative agenda to benefit those members.

In 2001, IATSE changed the word Employes in their name to Employees to reflect modern spelling.

The Labor Education Assistance Program (LEAP) was launched in 2009, which would pay tuition for labor studies courses taken by its local union officers. Following LEAP, the IA established the Training Trust to provide training opportunities in the areas of safety and skills development for IATSE members.

==== Averted 2021 strike ====
After passing an original July 31 deadline, as well as multiple extensions, negotiations between the IATSE and the Alliance of Motion Picture and Television Producers (AMPTP) over the Hollywood Basic Agreement (covering the Los Angeles area) and the Area Standards Agreement (covering the rest of the country) broke down in September 2021. The IATSE demands include higher minimum wages, a minimum time period between the end of one day and the start of another, an end to the current classification of streaming as "New Media" with lower minimum wages, (Note: The "new media" agreement between the IATSE and AMPTP was established in 2009.) and measures to dissuade studios from skipping breaks for meals. Meanwhile, a trend towards production of both shorter seasons and fewer seasons overall has resulted in shorter production schedules and fewer chances for promotions. The hashtag #IALivingWage has gained traction with a public call for a US$25.08–$25.95 minimum wage. On September 21, the IATSE announced a "nationwide strike authorization vote"; each local needs to reach a vote threshold of 75 percent yes for approval. The Los Angeles Times noted that in the wake of the COVID-19 pandemic and its effects on film and TV production, the unions were in a strong position; Paul Krugman of the New York Times opined that "[t]he sellers' market in labor has also emboldened union members, who have been much more willing than usual to go on strike". The board of directors of the Editors Guild, IATSE Local 700, "voted unanimously to recommend that Guild members vote yes in favor of a strike authorization vote". Similarly, the national executive board of the International Cinematographers Guild, IATSE Local 600, voted unanimously in favor of authorizing a strike.

Nationwide strike authorization votes were held from October 1 to 3. IATSE members voted 98.68 percent in favor of authorizing a strike, with ballots cast by 89.66 percent of eligible voters. (Note: Across 36 local unions, 59,478 members were eligible to vote. 52,706 members voted in favor of the strike authorization; 53,411 ballots were cast. All locals voted in favor, with a minimum vote of 96 percent in favor.) Afterwards, on October 4, IATSE president Matthew Loeb said "I hope that the studios will see and understand the resolve of our members ... The ball is in their court." The AMPTP said in a statement that it "remains committed to reaching an agreement that will keep the industry working".

Talks between the AMPTP and IATSE resumed on October 5 and continued through October 13. On October 9, Loeb informed IATSE members that either a deal or a strike would happen in "a matter of days, not weeks". The national executive director of the Editors Guild, Cathy Repola, said on October 12 that "the pace of negotiations does not reflect the urgency of the situation ... the employers repeatedly refuse to do what it will take to achieve a fair deal". Barring a last-minute deal, the IATSE is set to begin its strike on October 18; a spokesman for the AMPTP said that with "five days left to reach a deal ... the studios will continue to negotiate in good faith in an effort to reach an agreement for a new contract that will keep the industry working."

WGA East said in a statement that "[w]e work side by side with IATSE's members and we stand shoulder to shoulder with them in their contract fight". After the strike authorization vote, the national board of directors of the Directors Guild of America said it "stands in solidarity with our IATSE brothers, sisters and kin ... We urge the producers and studios of the AMPTP to return to the bargaining table and make a fair deal addressing ... critical issues." Cinematographer Halyna Hutchins supported the IATSE and planned to strike over dangerous working conditions days before her death in the 2021 Rust shooting incident.

Philippa Childs, head of the British entertainment union section BECTU, said the group was "fully behind the strike" and urged members in the event of a strike not to replace any striking IATSE members in the UK. In Australia, the MEAA said that the "unity and determination to achieve change shown by IATSE members sets a benchmark for all of us".

Congressional Democrats, comprising 31 Senators and 87 Representatives, wrote to AMPTP president Carol Lombardini on September 30 to express support for "the principles of adequate sleep, meal breaks[,] and living wages for all workers". Following the strike authorization vote, Democratic Representative Alexandria Ocasio-Cortez called the results "an incredible accomplishment" and "exactly the kind of mass-movement organizing we need right now". Senator Raphael Warnock (D-GA) tweeted that IATSE workers "are integral to Georgia's economy and I support their fight to push for fair wages and benefits, which they deserve".

A strike would have affected productions everywhere in the United States, as Locals 600, 700, and 800, representing camera crews, editors, and art directors, respectively, are national organizations. However, not all production work would be affected by a strike: IATSE has a separate "pay TV" agreement in place with various production companies including BET, Cinemax, HBO, Showtime, and Starz, and similar agreements exist for other types of productions, including music videos, sports productions, one-off single productions, low-budget theatrical productions, animated works, (Note: The Animation Guild, IATSE Local 839, conducts its own negotiations with the AMPTP.) and AICP-produced commercials. Broadway shows would also not be affected, and neither would post-production work for certain companies including Skywalker Sound, Tyler Perry Studios, and Vice Media.

The strike was temporarily averted on October 16, when a "tentative agreement" was reached between AMPTP and IATSE. The new three-year Hollywood Basic Agreement included 10-hour turnaround time between shifts, 54 and 32 hour weekend turnaround times, and 3% wage increases for each of the next three years. The deal also includes a "living wage" for the lowest-paid workers, improved wages and working conditions for streaming productions, and increased meal penalties. Negotiations continue for the Area Standards Agreement, and both contracts must be ratified by the union membership. On October 17, it was reported that many IATSE members would vote against the proposed agreement as it did not address their work conditions adequately.

The three-year contract was ratified by IATSE members on November 15, 2021, ending all prospects of a strike. A reported 72% of the 63,000 eligible members cast ballots. The vote was close, with a 256-188 delegate tally supporting the Basic Agreement and a 103-94 delegate tally in support for the Area Standards Agreement. However, more members actually voted against the deal with 50.4% of the voters against the Basic Agreement and 49.6% voting yes. For the Area Standards Agreement, 52% of members voted yes and 48% voted no.

== Membership ==
The membership process of the IATSE varies widely depending on each local. In order to become a member, interested applicants must contact the appropriate local union in their jurisdiction that covers their particular craft. Once accepted, members work under union contracts that guarantee certain wages, hours, benefits, safety guidelines, and other agreements, and gain opportunities to upgrade skills and master new technologies relating to their craft. Additionally, IATSE members enjoy benefits from Union Plus, a program created by the AFL-CIO to provide savings and discounts to union members.

== Organization and structure ==
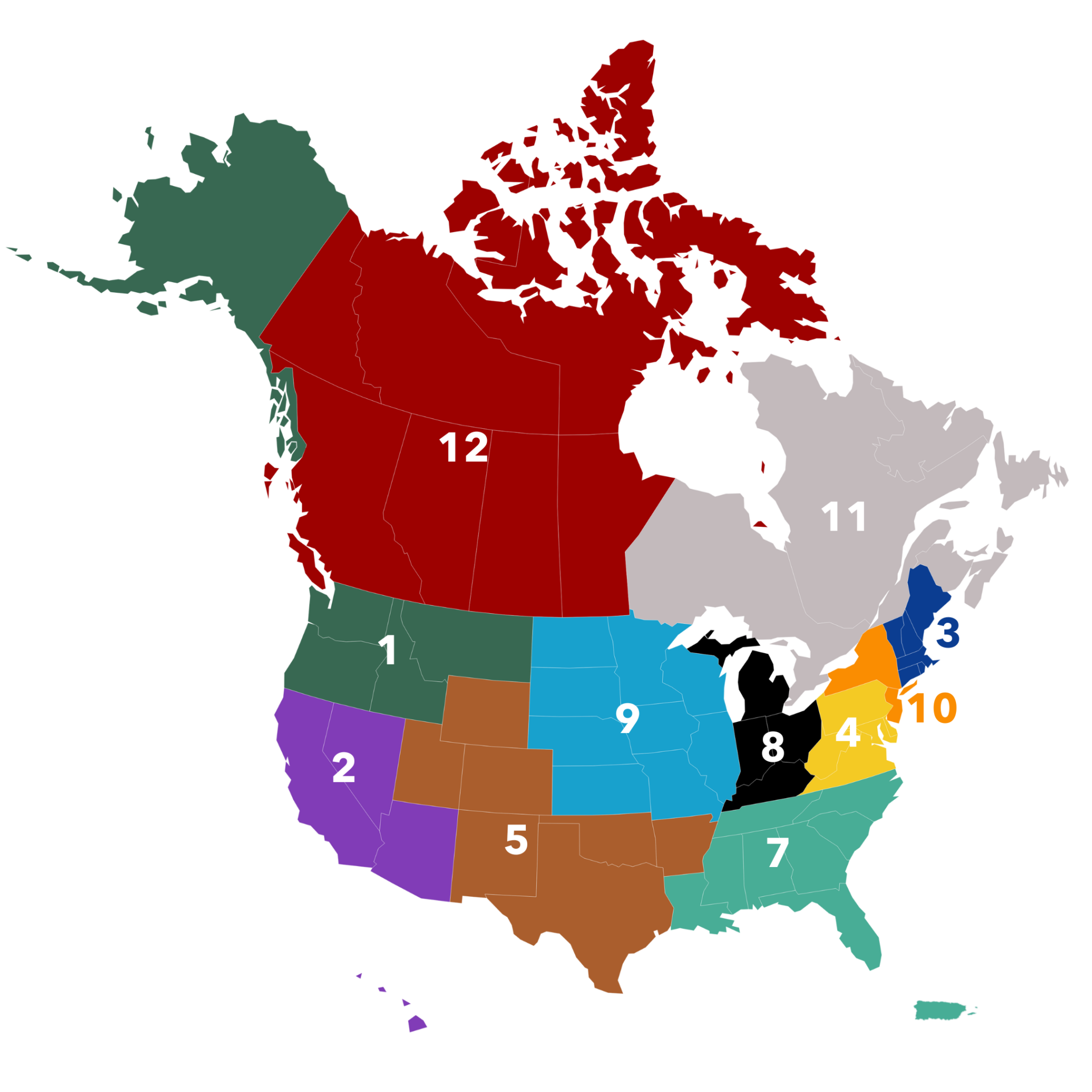
IATSE district map

Within the US and Canada, there are more than 375 IATSE local unions among 11 geographical districts, whose members make up the rank and file of the IATSE. The IATSE local unions are organized to represent workers by geographic and craft jurisdiction. Each craft falls under one of four departments: Stagecraft, Motion Picture and TV, Broadcast, and Tradeshow. The Canadian Department and Communications Department are two additional departments within the IA.

At the 2025 quadrennial convention Florida, Puerto Rico and US Virgin Islands were merged into District 7 and Texas, Arkansas and Oklahoma were merged into District 5. Districts 6 and 14 were eliminated.

=== International ===
The IATSE International Union supports all individual local unions and members in numerous ways, including by:

- Coordinating the negotiation of nationwide agreements within the US and Canada,
- Planning for the future by setting policies to improve the effectiveness of the locals and the International,
- Providing support for local unions and members as needed, including everything from craft training and leadership education to local administration, organizing, and collective bargaining assistance.

The International's General Executive Board is led by the International President. It consists of the General Secretary-Treasurer, and 13 International Vice-presidents. Of the Vice Presidents, two are designated to come from Canadian locals; one is designated to come from the West Coast Studio production locals; another, the Special Department locals; and the remainder are undesignated. Three International Trustees review the financial activities of the IATSE through semi-annual audits of the International's books and records. Also on the Board is the Canadian Labour Congress Delegate, who serves as a liaison between the IA and the CLC, Canada's umbrella organization for dozens of Canadian and international unions.

=== Canada ===
The Canadian Department oversees all IATSE Canadian affairs and supports the 16,000 Canadian members in 40 Locals through negotiations, training, and organizing.

The Canadian Department works with stage locals to organize more theaters, venues, and shows. Also involved in motion picture and tradeshow, the Canadian Department works closely with all other IATSE departments on international agreements with employers and provides education and training opportunities tailored for Canadian members. The department also provides support for Canadian members and locals, coordinates efforts on national initiatives with regards to benefits, legislation, political activism, lobbying, and more.

=== Districts ===
In the United States and possessions
| District Number | States and provinces served |
|---|---|
| 1 | Alaska; Montana; Idaho; Oregon; Washington |
| 2 | Arizona; California; Hawaii; Nevada |
| 3 | Maine; Massachusetts; New Hampshire; Rhode Island; Vermont; Connecticut |
| 4 | Pennsylvania; Delaware; Maryland; Virginia; West Virginia; District of Columbia |
| 5 | Wyoming; Colorado; Utah; New Mexico; Texas; Oklahoma; Arkansas |
| 7 | Tennessee; Alabama; Georgia; North Carolina; South Carolina; Mississippi; Louisiana; Florida; Puerto Rico; US Virgin Islands |
| 8 | Michigan; Indiana; Ohio; Kentucky |
| 9 | Wisconsin; Iowa; Illinois; Missouri; Minnesota; North Dakota; South Dakota; Nebraska; Kansas |
| 10 | New York; New Jersey |

In Canada
| District Number | States and provinces served |
|---|---|
| 11 | Ontario; Quebec; New Brunswick; Nova Scotia; Prince Edward Island; Newfoundland and Labrador |
| 12 | Manitoba; Saskatchewan; Alberta; British Columbia |

=== US national charters ===
- International Cinematographers Guild, Local 600
- Motion Picture Editors Guild, Local 700
- United Scenic Artists, Local USA829
- Art Directors Guild, Local 800
- Production Workers Guild, Local 111

=== Local unions ===
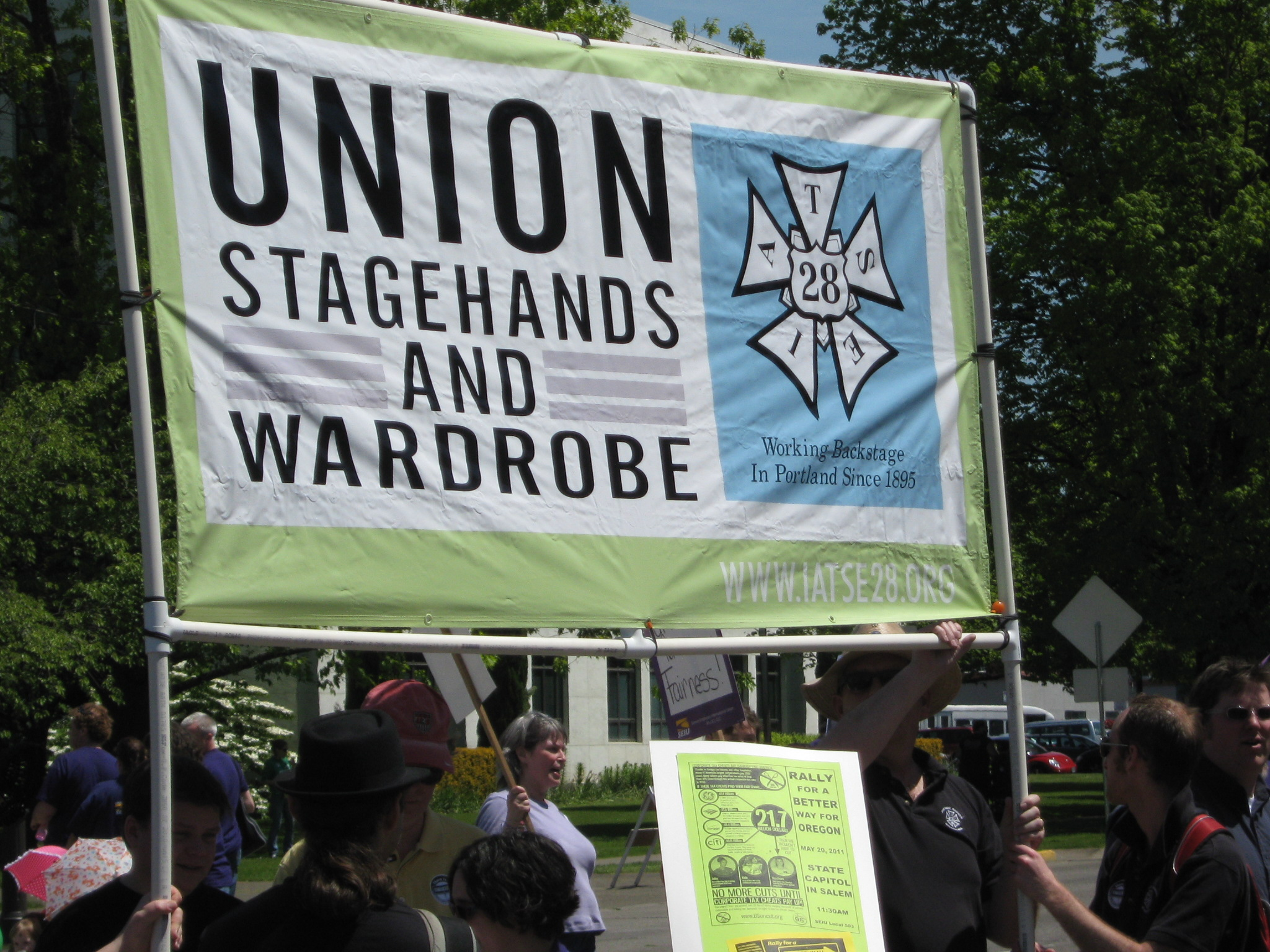
Local 28 picket in support of SEIU/AFSCME during a rally at the State Capitol in Portland, OR

Each local functions autonomously, maintaining their own Constitution and By-Laws, elections, dues structure, membership meetings, and more. Locals negotiate labor contracts regarding wages, work rules, and grievance procedures. They also provide services to their members by administering health and retirement funds and providing training and education. The IATSE local unions work for the interest of their membership, while also representing the overarching goals of the IATSE International.

==== Stagecraft ====
Stagecraft members work in venues that include Broadway theaters, opera houses, dance centers, regional theaters, seasonal outdoor amphitheaters, arenas, concert halls, parks, television awards venues, and stadiums. Additionally, the front-of-house workers, press agents, house managers, and other employees working in the business side of the venue (not the creative/technical side) may also be represented by IATSE However, this is not a set rule, and the employees covered by IATSE depends on the agreement made between IATSE and the venue.

==== Motion picture and TV ====
Members of the IATSE Motion Picture Division help create all elements of movies and television. Motion Picture and TV members build the sets, design the clothing, frame the image, record the dialogue, edit the scenes, and animate the characters to help bring a story to life. The IATSE also covers transportation in Canada excluding two provinces. Their work covers movies large and small, television shows, animated films and series, internet content, television shows across the dial – including children's programming, reality, game, awards, and talk shows.

==== Tradeshow ====
As one of the newcomers to the entertainment world, the Convention and Tradeshow Industry has been enlarging its footprint over the last four decades. In that time, IATSE Stage and Exhibition Locals have been engaged in the installation and dismantling of local, national, and international Conventions and Tradeshows. More recently, the International's Tradeshow Department has formalized its relationship with multi-national employers by initiating national agreements and standardizing conditions for workers in the industry.

==== Broadcast ====
The IATSE has represented workers in television broadcasting for over sixty years. Initially, IA members in the broadcast were employed primarily at local television stations. Beginning in 1998 the IATSE began to organize technicians engaged in telecasting live sports events over regional cable sports networks. Today the Broadcast Department consists of numerous local unions that represent television station employees, locals that specialize in live sports broadcasting, and thousands of members working in broadcast from stage, studio mechanics, wardrobe and make-up artists, and hairstylist local unions. Broadcast technicians include technical directors, audio technicians, camera operators, video technicians, capture playback operators, editors, graphics artists, and utility technicians.

=== Communications ===
The Communications Department enhances and supports the IATSE by maintaining the IATSE's website, social media channels, email program, and coordinating with other departments and Locals to disseminate information. Established in 2011, the Communications Department has set up an informal network of communication amongst Locals, and between Locals and the International. The Communications Department also creates educational materials to assist local unions and IATSE staff with modern communications methods and platforms.

=== Education and training ===
The Education & Training Department facilitates and supports a culture of ongoing learning within the IATSE. Equally dedicated to leadership skills for union officers and craft skills and safety training for workers, the department sponsors and promotes union skills courses and workshops. It also works closely with the IATSE Training Trust Fund, ETCP, InfoComm, USITT, and others in order to help workers keep abreast of new technologies, equipment, and styles of work.

Additionally, the department operates outreach programs to high school and college students. The department was officially established in 2012, following the founding of the Labor Education Assistance Program (LEAP) in 2009. LEAP provides reimbursement money to officers of local unions who enroll in qualifying Labor Studies Programs.

== Presidents ==
- 1893: John Williams
- 1894: Lee M. Hart
- 1895: Claude L. Hagen
- 1896: P. Maloney
- 1897: Charles R. Norman
- 1898: William D. B. Wiggins
- 1900: Joseph B. Fenton
- 1901: Charles H. Bonn
- 1903: Patrick T. Barry
- 1905: John Suarez
- 1908: John J. Barry
- 1911: Charles C. Shay
- 1916: James F. Burke of IATSE local 182
- 1920: James Lemke
- 1922: Charles C. Shay
- 1924: William F. Canavan
- 1932: William C. Elliot
- 1934: George E. Browne
- 1941: Richard F. Walsh
- 1974: Walter F. Diehl
- 1986: Alfred W. Di Tolla
- 1994: Tom Short
- 2008: Matthew Loeb

== See also ==
- VFX Union, a wing under the IATSE
