= Matthew Loeb =

American labor union leader

Matthew D. Loeb is an American labor union leader.

Loeb joined the United Scenic Artists local of the International Alliance of Theatrical Stage Employees (IATSE) in 1989. In 1994, he began working for the union as an international representative and chaired its East Coast Council for many years. He was later appointed as the union's first division director of Motion Picture and Television Production. In 2002, he was elected as a vice president of the union, and then in 2008 as its president.

At each IATSE quadrennial convention, Loeb has run unopposed and has been re-elected via acclamation in 2009, 2013, 2017, 2021, and 2025.

As leader of the union, Loeb led organizing drives, increased training and campaigned for improved safety. He was also elected as a vice president of the AFL-CIO, to the executive of the UNI Global Union, and as president of its Media and Entertainment Industry sector.

Trade union offices
Preceded by Tom Short	President of the International Alliance of Theatrical Stage Employees; 2008–present	Succeeded by Incumbent
