= R. Thomas Buffenbarger =

American labor leader

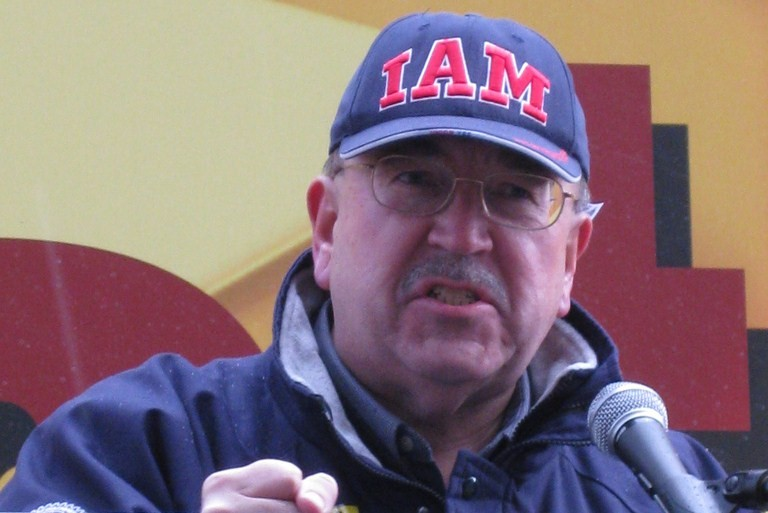
- Buffenbarger speaking at a rally in Erie, Pennsylvania, in 2008
- Born: 1950 (age 75–76)
- Occupation: President of the IAM
- Spouse: Linda
- Children: Amy and Andrew

Robert Thomas "Tom" Buffenbarger is an American labor leader and former president of the International Association of Machinists and Aerospace Workers (IAM).

== Background ==
Buffenbarger is a member of the executive council of the AFL-CIO and a member of the Economic Policy Institute's board of directors, serves as chairman of the Labor Advisory Committee to the U.S. Trade Representative, and is a past member of the U.S. Treasury Department's Advisory Committee to the International Monetary Fund. Buffenbarger also once served on the National Advisory Board of the Apollo Alliance and was one of the original 130 founders of the Campaign for America's Future.

Buffenbarger is a member of the National Executive Board of the Boy Scouts of America, the organization's governing body. He is a recipient of the Silver Buffalo Award.

Trade union offices
Preceded by George Kourpias	President of the International Association of Machinists and Aerospace Workers; 1997–2016	Succeeded by Robert Martinez Jr.
