= William Konyha =

William Konyha (May 11, 1915 – December 27, 2001) was a carpenter and an American labor leader. He was president of the United Brotherhood of Carpenters and Joiners of America from January 1, 1980 to October 31, 1982.

He was born in 1915 in Cleveland, Ohio, to Louis and Mary (Gabor) Konyha. His father was a carpenter. He was educated in public schools, and attended a four-year trade school before becoming a carpenter in 1936. He joined Local 1180 in Cleveland.

In 1939, Konyha was elected president of Local 11800 and business manager for the Cleveland District Council of Carpenters.

During World War II, Konyha served in the Seabees and served and saw combat in the South Pacific.

After the war, he attended Chicago Technical College from 1945 to 1947.

In 1947, he was hired as an organizer by the international Carpenters union. In 1952, he became a staff representative, and began servicing contracts throughout Ohio.

In 1960, Konyha was elected president of the Ohio State Council of Carpenters. In 1962, he was elected president of the Ohio AFL-CIO.

He resigned both positions in 1970 when he was elected a vice president of the international Carpenters union representing District 3. He was elected second vice president in 1972, and first vice president in 1973.

Konyha was appointed to the Federal Apprentice Committee by President Richard Nixon.

After the retirement of William Sidell in 1979, Konyha was elected his successor as president of the Carpenters union. In 1980, Konyha was elected a vice president of the AFL-CIO, and he won a full term as Carpenters president in 1981.

In 1981, Konyha invited President Ronald Reagan to be honorary chair of the union's 100th anniversary celebration. Reagan agreed. In the interim, Reagan asked Congress for tax cuts and fired striking federal air traffic controllers. Konyha spent the intervening months attacking Reagan's tax policy, and defended the right of federal workers to strike after Reagan's speech. Nevertheless, the bad blood between the two men did not prevent Reagan from appointing Konyha to the National Productivity Advisory Committee later that year.

== Retirement ==
Konyha unexpectedly resigned a year into his term. He quit the presidency on October 31, 1982. No reason was given for his sudden announcement. First vice president Patrick J. Campbell succeeded him as interim president.

Once retired, Konyha raised racehorses. In 1991, Konyha and a group of investors (which included a former Ohio state racing commissioner) bought Finger Lakes Race Track near Syracuse, New York.

Konyha and his wife, Evelyn, had six children. He was preceded in death by one son.

Trade union offices
Preceded by William Sidell	President of the United Brotherhood of Carpenters and Joiners of America; 1980 – October 31, 1982	Succeeded by Patrick J. Campbell
