= International Association of Machinists and Aerospace Workers =

North American trade union

- Abbreviation: IAM; IAMAW
- Formation: 1888
- Type: Trade union
- Headquarters: Upper Marlboro, Maryland, US
- Locations: Canada; United States
- Members: 573,365 (2021)
- President: Brian Bryant
- Secretary-treasurer: Dora Cervantes
- Affiliations: AFL–CIO; Building and Wood Workers' International; Canadian Labour Congress; IndustriALL Global Union; International Transport Workers' Federation
- Website: goiam.org
- Formerly called: Order of United Machinists and Mechanical Engineers; National Association of Machinists; International Association of Machinists

The International Association of Machinists and Aerospace Workers (IAM) is an AFL–CIO/CLC trade union representing nearly 600,000 workers as of 2021 in more than 200 industries with most of its membership in the United States and Canada.

== Origin ==
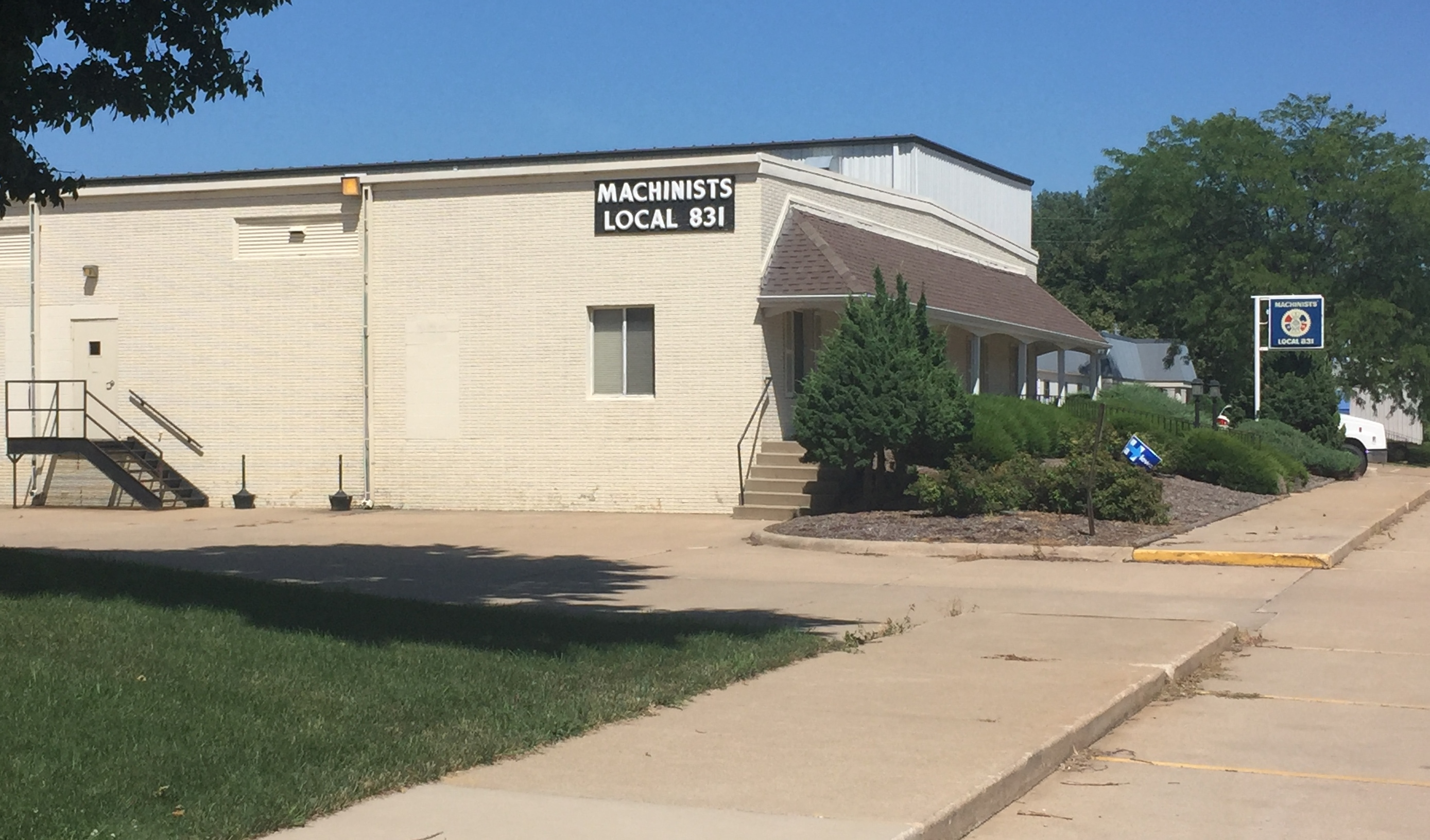
International Association of Machinists Local 831 Hall in Cedar Rapids, Iowa

On May 5, 1888, Thomas W. Talbot, a railroad machinist in Atlanta, Georgia, founded the Order of United Machinists and Mechanical Engineers. Talbot and 18 others had been members in the Knights of Labor. Talbot believed that a union needed to be formed for railroad machinists that would resist wage cuts. He wanted to provide insurance against unemployment, illness, and accidents but also wanted railroad machinists to be recognized for their craft skill. Unlike the Knights of Labor, who accepted everyone, Talbot's union accepted only white US citizens, preferably native-born. The union excluded blacks, women, and non-citizens, and had secret passwords. Despite the secrecy, the order spread beyond Georgia, thanks in part to "boomers", men who traveled the railway lines for work. These boomers established local lodges in new areas. Within one year there were 40 lodges, and by 1891, there were 189.

On May 6, 1889, the Machinists held their first major convention in Atlanta. Talbot was elected the Grand Master Machinist (later known as the international president), and William L. Dawley was elected as Grand Secretary (now known as General Secretary-Treasurer). The Organization's name was changed to the National Association of Machinists (NAM) and a constitution was drawn up. The NAM began publishing the 16-page Machinists Monthly Journal. Also in 1889, Frank French designed an emblem for the union. The emblem consisted of a flywheel, a friction joint caliper, and a machinist's square with the initials of the organization. According to French, the flywheel represented the ongoing power of the union once it started, and the caliper signified an extended invitation to all persons of civilized countries. The square signified that IAM was square and honest.

In 1890 and 1891, NAM reached Canada, making Canadians the first international members. Locals were also formed in Mexico. To reflect this, in 1891 the name was changed from National Association of Machinists to International Association of Machinists (IAM), at a conference in Pittsburgh, Pennsylvania.

In 1892, IAM signed a contract with the Atchison, Topeka and Santa Fe Railway, establishing the first organized shop at a railroad in the United States. Because IAM had a color bar, the American Federation of Labor (AFL) did not accept IAM right away.

After IAM finally did join the AFL, AFL President Samuel Gompers urged IAM to drop its whites-only rule. But IAM maintained racial segregation, arguing that it needed to retain Southern members. Talbot wanted the union to be a fraternity of white men born in the United States who possessed good moral character. His sentiments were echoed by other AFL member unions, whose locals routinely discriminated against black workers through racial exclusion policies, which the AFL rarely commented on.

== 1920s–1940s ==
World War I and wartime production drove membership in the Machinists to 300,000 in 1918, making it the country's largest union. Just five years later, membership dropped to 80,000. Amid the Great Depression, membership declined further, to 50,000—some 23,000 of whom were unemployed. In 1935, the machinists started to organize with the airline industry. In 1936, the Boeing Company in Seattle, Washington, signed the industry's first labor agreement. By 1938, the IAM negotiated the first union agreement in air transportation with Eastern Air Lines. In 1944, IAM union members established an education department to publish a supplemental journal. Initially published weekly by The Machinist, the IAM newspaper, the journal's production was eventually reduced to twice a year, then voted out of existence in 1956. It was replaced with a quarterly magazine entitled The IAMW Journal.

=== Break with AFL ===
In 1945, IAM disaffiliated with the AFL, which had failed to settle a jurisdictional dispute between IAM and the United Brotherhood of Carpenters and Joiners of America as well as the Amalgamated Association of Street and Electric Railway and Motor Coach Employees of America.

In 1947 Congress passed the Taft Hartley Act, officially known as the Labor-Management Relations Act, which placed restrictions on union activities. This act also contained provisions that made closed shops illegal and outlawed boycotts. The second section of the Taft Hartley Act was controversial because it allowed states to pass right-to-work laws, which enabled them to regulate the number of union shops. Furthermore, the machinists worked with AFL unions to repeal the act. The limitations imposed on union political activity by this act led to the creation of the Machinists' Non-Partisan Political League. In 1948, Lodge 751 went on strike against the Boeing Company in Seattle, Washington. The machinists preserved longstanding seniority rules that the company wanted to abolish and achieved a 10 percent per hour raise. IAM also competed for members with the United Auto Workers of America in the automotive industry and with the United Aerospace Workers for aircraft working in that union. In 1949, IAM signed no-raiding agreements with both unions. Those agreements become the model for other unions when AFL and the CIO merged in 1955.

== Recent history ==
Membership (US records)
View source data.
Finances (US records; ×$1000)
View source data.

The 1950s was a period of rapid growth for IAM. The production of jet engines during the war led IAM to expand to the aircraft industry. By 1958, IAM had more than 900,000 members. This was because IAM took steps to begin to move away from its racist past. In 1955, under the leadership of President Al Hayes IAM became more of an industrial union; it began to shift from railroad work to metal fabrication. IAM had more union members as well as workers in the aircraft industry. Thus, Aerospace workers were attracted to join IAM. The trade union produced a first-of-its-kind radio show, Boomer Jones, to tell their history in a modern way.

In 1964, IAM changed its name to the International Association of Machinists and Aerospace Workers. IAMAW began to strike against five major airlines, including Eastern, National, Northwest, Trans World, and United Airlines. 35,400 IAMAW members in 231 cities grounded the airlines for 43 days finally winning 5 percent raises in three successive years. IAM membership nearly doubled in the 1950s, in large part due to the burgeoning airline industry, from 501,000 members in 1949 to 903,000 members in 1958. As a result of the influx of members from the airlines and the new American space program, the delegates voted to change the name to the International Association of Machinists and Aerospace Workers at the 1964 convention. In 1982, due to individual and corporate bankruptcies IAM membership dropped to 820,211 members from a high of 927,000 in 1973. Also, in 1982 boycott was initiated by the IAM against Brown & Sharpe, a machine, precision, measuring and cutting tool manufacturer, headquartered in Rhode Island. The boycott was called after the firm refused to bargain in good faith (withdrawing previously negotiated clauses in the contract), and forced the union into a strike, during which police sprayed pepper gas on some 800 picketers at the company's North Kingston plant in early 1982. Three weeks later, a machinist narrowly escaped serious injury when a shot fired into the picket line hit his belt buckle.

The National Labor Relations Board later charged Brown & Sharpe with regressive bargaining, and of entering into negotiations with the express purpose of not reaching an agreement with the union. It was not until 1998, nearly seventeen years after the strike began, that the Rhode Island Supreme Court ended the legal battle, ultimately siding with Brown & Sharpe in its plea that it had not illegally forced the strike. By this point, both Brown & Sharpe and its erstwhile work force were retreating from manufacturing in Rhode Island.

From 1981 to 1990 the union owned and operated an Indy Car racing team, Machinists Union Racing.

In 1991, the union absorbed the Pattern Makers' League of North America. The Transportation Communications International Union (TCU) merged with the IAM, after a TCU member vote in July 2005.

On September 7, 2008, the union began a 57-day strike against Boeing over issues with outsourcing, job security, pay and benefits.

The union continues to expand into different companies today. In December 2013 the union's attempt to represent workers at an Amazon.com fulfillment center in Middletown, Delaware, failed. In 2020, the union began a strike at Bath Iron Works, a major shipyard in Bath, Maine, over disagreements regarding a new labor contract with the company. The strike, occurring during the COVID-19 pandemic, was described by the IAM President as "the largest strike in the United States of America right now.” The strike ended after two months, with new labor contract agreements viewed as favorable to the union members.

On September 12, 2024, IAM District 751 voted to strike against Boeing over a proposed contract's pay and benefits with 94.6% of votes in and 96% in favor of a strike. The union leadership had reached a tentative agreement with Boeing prior to the vote and endorsed the contract.

== Composition ==
According to IAM's Department of Labor records, since 2005, when membership classifications were first reported, the union's membership has been generally in a slow decline, including "dues paying", "retired", and "exempt" members. Despite this, "life" members were reported to have had a 22 percent increase during this period, and "unemployed" members momentarily increased to a peak in 2009, before also declining. Members classified as "on strike" have varied considerably throughout, although remaining less than 1 percent of the total membership. IAM contracts also cover some non-members, known as agency fee payers, which since 2005 have grown to number comparatively just over 1 percent of the size of the union's membership. As of 2013, this accounts for about 145,000 "retirees" (25 percent), 52,000 "life" members (9 percent), 26,000 "exempt" members (5 percent), and 14,000 "unemployed" members (2 percent), plus about 7,000 non-members paying agency fees, compared to about 333,000 dues paying" members (58 percent).

=== Affiliates ===
- National Federation of Federal Employees
- Transportation Communications International Union

== International Presidents ==
- 1888–1890: Thomas W. Talbot
- 1890–1892: James J. Creamer
- 1892–1893: John O'Day
- 1893–1911: James O'Connell
- 1911–1926: William Hugh Johnston
- 1926–1939: Arthur O. Wharton
- 1939–1949: Harvey W. Brown
- 1949–1965: Al J. Hayes
- 1965–1969: P. L. Siemiller
- 1969–1977: Floyd E. Smith
- 1977–1989: William W. Winpisinger
- 1989–1997: George Kourpias
- 1997–2016: R. Thomas Buffenbarger
- 2016–2023: Robert Martinez Jr.
- 2024–Present: Brian Bryant

== Legal issues ==
The association was sued in 2010 after an election of local union officers went badly. A lawsuit was brought by the officers against the union and claimed libel, defamation, and invasion of privacy. While the court ruled for the defendant, the case exposed thousands of grievances filed against the union, dubious handling of the election, and other misconduct; including using union computer equipment for viewing pornography, missing promotional items purchased with union funds, and significant mishandling of union funds.

In 1980, the union sued the Federal Election Commission for issues surrounding political action committee contributions. This case eventually went to the Supreme Court.

A Boeing worker sued the union over unlawful dues deductions. The settlement required IAM to return illegally seized dues.

The association sued furniture maker IKEA over unsafe workplace issues in 2010.

== See also ==
- League of Independent Workers of the San Joaquin Valley
- International Woodworkers of America

== General References ==
- International Association of Machinists and Aerospace Workers (IAMAW), Lodge 1145 Records, 1971-1998. M.E. Grenander Department of Special Collections and Archives, University Libraries, University at Albany, State University of New York (hereafter referred to as the IAMAW, Lodge 1145 Records).

== Archives ==
- Preliminary Guide to the International Association of Machinists Hope Lodge 79 Records. 1932–1941. 25 items.
- International Association of Machinists and Aerospace Workers, Aerospace Industrial District Lodge 751 Publications. 1939–2008.
- Jackie Boschok Papers. 1979–2013. 16.32 cubic feet (22 boxes), 2 oversize folders.
- George E. Rennar Papers. 1933–1972. 37.43 cubic feet.
- Matthew C. Bates Papers. 1988–2002. 0.48 cubic feet (1 box and 1 oversize folder).
