= Paschal McGuinness =

American labor unionist (1933–2026)

Paschal McGuinness (October 2, 1933 – August 15, 2026) was an Irish-American labor union activist.

== Early life and career ==
McGuinness was born in County Cavan, Ireland on October 2, 1933. During his early life, he learned the Carpenter trade via an apprenticeship program. After emigrating to the United States, McGuinness joined Local Union 608 of the United Brotherhood of Carpenters and Joiners of America in November 1957.

=== Local 608 Tenure ===
United Brotherhood of Carpenters Local Union 608 was organized in 1911, and dissolved in 2010. After working as a Carpenter and Superintendent for a number of years, McGuinness was appointed Business Agent by Local 608 President, John O'Connor in the 1970s. He took over the role of Business Manager after Big John O'Connor moved to the NYC District Council of Carpenters. When the District Council of Carpenters was coming out of trusteeship, McGuinness ran against Big John O'Connor and won in 1984, a position he held until 1991. This effectively forced O'Connor to retire. McGuinness held the position of President of the New York City District Council of Carpenters as well as President of Local Union 608. After having a RICO suit filed against him and the council, McGuinness agreed to a Consent Decree with the US Government. He was elected to office of Second Vice President in the United Brotherhood of Carpenters in Washington DC. The Consent Decree is still in effect with a Federal Judge and an Independent Investigator overseeing the operations of the NYC District Council, and its affiliated Local Unions.

=== Local 608 Dissolved ===
After years of trying to root out corruption, and having five Presidents (and other officers) in a one-year period, the President of the United Brotherhood of Carpenters, decided to dissolve Local Union 608 on December 14, 2010. From its beginnings in 1918, the Local served a mostly Irish community of carpenters, and is no more.

=== NYC District Council ===
McGuinness was the managing trustee of the NYC District Council of Carpenters Benefit Funds when it purchased and renovated the new headquarters building at 395 Hudson Street in NYC at a cost that exceeded $120 million despite a $73 million appraisal. The building is often referred to as McGuinness's Palace.

=== Building and Construction Trades Department ===
After the UBC election of 1991 had been overturned by the United States Department of Labor (DOL), the DOL sued the UBC and reached a settlement in 1995 calling for a new election, McGuinness retired from his position as First Vice President of the United Brotherhood of Carpenters, allowing Douglas McCarron to advance to that position. McGuiness was then elected Secretary-Treasurer of the Building and Construction Trades Department of the AFL-CIO in 1995, a position he would have to give up due to federal investigations.

=== Indictments ===
There were several indictments of McGuinness during his tenure as Business Manager and President of Local Union 608. These indictments culminated in the signing of the Consent Decree of the District Council with the Federal Government. The Consent Decree forced McGuinness out of Union office in the State of New York, and also left the District Council under the control of an Independent Investigator from circa 1994. The District Council is still under the constraints of the Consent Decree and a Federal Judge. It is questionable if the government attempts at rooting out corruption has been successful or not. McGuinness was acquitted of several charges at trial while his co-workers were not as successful.

=== Mafia ===
There have been reputed rumors that McGuinness was under the control of the Mafia during his tenure of President of the District Council.

== Personal life and death ==
McGuinness lived in Spring Lake, New Jersey, and Myrtle Beach, South Carolina. He died on August 15, 2026, at the age of 92.

Trade union offices
Preceded by Joseph F. Maloney	Secretary-Treasurer of the Building and Construction Trades Department; 1995–2000	Succeeded by Joseph Maloney
