= Federation of Organized Trades and Labor Unions =

Former trade union of the United States

- Federation of Organized Trades and Labor Unions of the United States and Canada
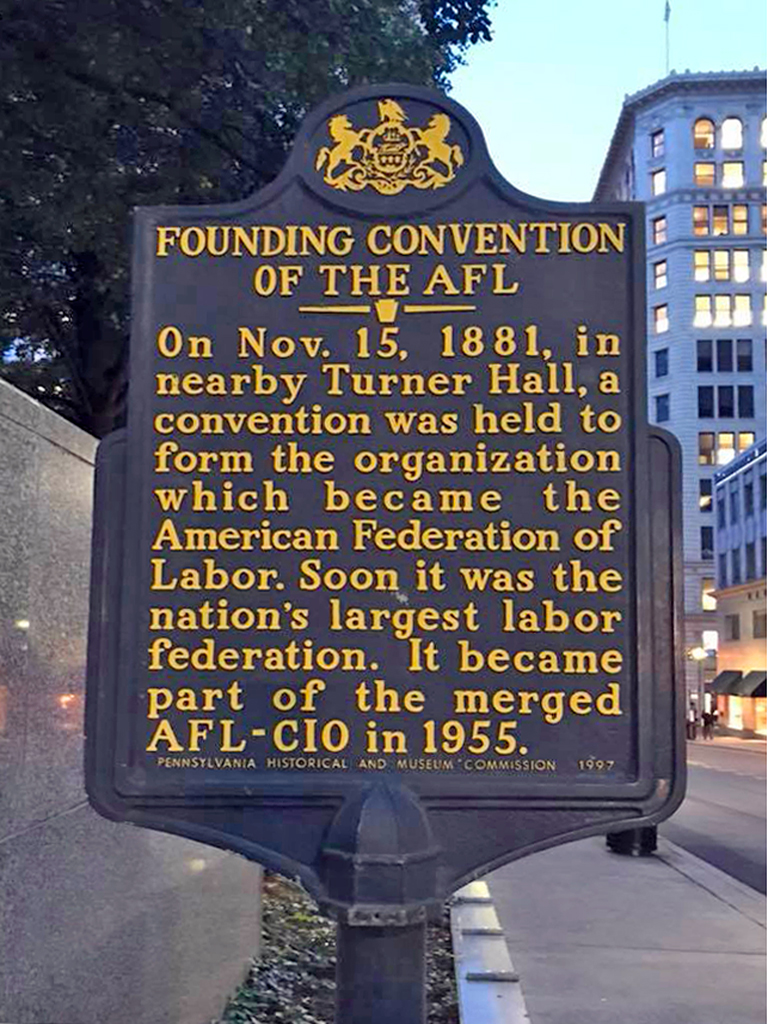
- Merged into: American Federation of Labor
- Founded: November 15, 1881
- Dissolved: December 8, 1886
- Location(s): United States and Canada
- Key people: Samuel Gompers, Chair, Executive Committee

The Federation of Organized Trades and Labor Unions of the United States and Canada (FOTLU) was a federation of labor unions created on November 15, 1881, at Turner Hall in Pittsburgh. It changed its name to the American Federation of Labor (AFL) on December 8, 1886.

== Forces influencing the formation of FOTLU ==
During the Long Depression of 1873–1878, the Knights of Labor emerged as a potent force for workers in the United States. Many in the American labor movement, such as Samuel Gompers, sought to implement a 'New Unionism' program which would free unions from political affiliation and limit their goals to the day-to-day concerns of working people.

Following a failed 107-day cigar-makers' strike in 1877, Gompers assisted President Adolph Strasser in radically restructuring the Cigar Makers' International Union (CMIU) in 1879. Henceforth, the union would be run like a business. The international union would have the authority to take control of local affiliates. Dues would be raised to build financial reserves, and to pay sick and death benefits. A union bank would be established to provide short-term loans for workers who had been laid off and were seeking new jobs. The constitution of the union would be changed to permit the international to seize funds from locals with flush treasuries and transfer the money to locals in distress.

Other unions such as the Brotherhood of Carpenters and Joiners also quickly adopted the principles of the 'New Unionism.'

In April 1881, Gompers lost a re-election campaign for the presidency of Local 144 of the Cigar Makers' International Union to a coalition of socialists who advocated militancy as a way to improve working conditions of cigar makers. But Gompers and his allies refused to turn over the keys to the offices or the contents of the union's treasury, arguing that the socialists were not fit to hold office. William H. Bailey and Thomas Barry, two executive board members of the Knights of Labor, supported the insurgents against Gompers and may have sabotaged a compromise which would have permitted Gompers to step down. The experience embittered Gompers against the Knights.

== FOTLU's founding ==
The same month of April 1881, the Paterson 'Home-Journal,' a socialist newspaper in Paterson, New Jersey, called for a conference of labor unions to form a new organization which would organize large numbers of workers. A group of disaffected Knights of Labor in Indiana calling themselves the Knights of Industry and a shadowy group calling itself the Amalgamated Labor Union took up the charge and announced a conference to be held August 2, 1881 in Terre Haute. The International Typographical Union, eager to establish a national labor union, also widely publicized the conference. But more delegates from trade associations and the United States Greenback Party attended than unionists. A resolution against trade unionism was actually proposed, and labor union delegates had to work hard to secure adjournment in order to avoid passage of the motion. The trade unionists decided to call another conference for November 15, 1881 in Pittsburgh, Pennsylvania, where a larger number of trade union members could participate.

The Pittsburgh convention was attended by 107 delegates from eight national unions, 11 city labor federations, 42 local craft unions, and three district and 46 local assemblies of the Knights of Labor. The International Typographical Union had the largest trade union delegation, with 14 attendees. The Amalgamated Association of Iron and Steel Workers, International Molders and Foundry Workers Union of North America, the American Flint Glass Workers' Union of North America, the Cigar Makers' International Union, the Brotherhood of Carpenters and Joiners, the Coopers' International Union of North America, the International Granite Cutter's Union and the Lake Seamen's Union also attended. Gompers participated as a delegate from the Cigar Makers'.

John J. Jarrett, president of the Iron and Steel Workers, was elected chairman. Gompers was elected chairman of the Committee on Organization. Gompers led his committee to propose that FOTLU restrict its membership to skilled craft unions, excluding unskilled workers and political labor organizations. The proposal was hotly debated. The Knights of Labor believed fervently in a concept of the labor movement that was inclusive of both skilled and unskilled labor. A mass movement of workers was the Knights' goal. But Gompers' Committee on Organization had proposed limiting FOTLU membership to skilled workers, and restricting the labor movement to a select few. Knights of Labor delegates were outraged. Nevertheless, the resolution was adopted. The name of the organization was also altered to adopt an international character by adding 'United States and Canada.'

In large part, FOTLU's founding principles and constitutional structures mirrored those Gompers had helped institute in the cigar makers' union. The FOTLU constitution provided for a governing body of five executive council members, who would also act as a legislative committee. Annual conventions were established at which each national affiliate would receive one vote for 1,000 members, two votes for 4,000 members and three votes for 8,000 members. Local labor bodies were given one vote each, regardless of size. The voting rules effectively disenfranchised bodies belonging to the Knights of Labor, and Knights-dominated central labor bodies.

The Committee on Platform subsequently proposed, and the delegates approved, a preamble to the FOTLU constitution which sharply delineated the new federation from the Knights of Labor. It rejected the Knights' assertion that the interests of capital and labor were one. FOTLU asserted that 'A struggle is going on in the nations of the civilized world between the oppressors and the oppressed...a struggle between capital and labor, which must grow in intensity from year to year and work disastrous results to the toiling millions of all nations...'

The committee also proposed a number of resolutions, all of which were passed by the delegates. These included calls for:

- The legal incorporation of unions;
- Compulsory education of children;
- Prohibition of child labor under the age of 14;
- Apprenticeship laws;
- Establishment of an eight-hour work day;
- Repeal of state conspiracy laws which did not provide a safe harbor for labor unions;
- Establishment of a federal agency to collect labor statistics;
- Abolition of convict labor;
- Prohibition of the importation of foreign workers;
- Federal legislation requiring ventilation and inspection of mines;
- Support for Irish liberation;
- Legislation making employers responsible for industrial accidents; and
- A high protective tariff.

Two resolutions were rejected. One called for federal regulation of railroad and telegraph companies in the public interest, and another demanded that only homesteaders be eligible to receive public domain land.

Gompers was elected to the executive committee.

== Struggle for survival ==
FOTLU was not very successful. District and local assemblies of the Knights of Labor withdrew almost immediately, as did most national unions. Only 19 delegates attended the second convention, and 26 at the third. Gompers was elected chairman of FOTLU's executive committee (making him the de facto president) in 1883, but even he did not attend that meeting. The federation's membership hovered around 25,000, and FOTLU organized almost no members and issued no charters to new unions.

The federation made some effort to win passage of favorable legislation, but no unified plan of action took place. FOTLU did help defeat a federal bill which would have declared seamen's unions to be mutinies. But the organization was far more successful on the state level, where it won passage of legislation outlawing cigar-making in tenement houses, prohibitions on child labor under those under the age of 12, compulsory education and prohibitions on prison labor.

Meanwhile, the Knights of Labor were growing tremendously in the 1884-85 period. A series of successful strikes swept the country, affecting textile workers, plumbers, bricklayers, stove molders, stonecutters, carpet weavers, shoemakers, glass molders and coal miners. The Knights struck the Union Pacific Railway, forcing the company to rescind a 10 percent wage cut in 1884 and another 10 percent wage reduction the company tried to introduce the following year. In July 1885, the Knights had 104,000 members; by July 1886, they had 703,000 members.

But FOTLU stagnated. Its membership was so low that it was forced change its policy and admit women and girls as members in 1882. Few joined.

1882 was also the year that FOTLU adopted a proposal to establish a national Labor Day holiday on the first Monday in September. It was one of its few successes. (A federal bill ordering observance of Labor Day was introduced in the U.S. Congress in 1894, and the bill was enacted into law and signed by President Grover Cleveland on June 28 of that year.)

At its October 1884 convention, FOTLU attempted to reinvigorate itself by adopting a resolution again pushing for establishment of the eight-hour day. Peter J. McGuire, president of the Carpenters union, proposed a resolution—which FOTLU adopted—which required that, if national legislation adopting an eight-hour day was not forthcoming by May 1, 1886, the federation would call a general strike. The leadership of the Knights secretly issued a statement advising its members not to participate in the fight for the eight-hour day, but members of the Knights of Labor overwhelmingly supported the proposal and made plans to support the federation in its May Day strike. Preparations were most advanced in Chicago.

In March 1886, the Knights of Labor struck the Union Pacific and Missouri Pacific railroads. The Great Southwest Railroad Strike of 1886 idled 200,000 rail workers. But by the beginning of the summer of 1886, the strike was beginning to collapse—and it was taking the Knights with it.

FOTLU was also in crisis. The Knights of Labor had actively undermined FOTLU and raided its unions during the previous five years. The Knights had provided scab workers to employers during strikes called by FOTLU unions. The Knights had publicly denounced FOTLU initiatives, legislative proposals and organizing efforts. Now the Knights began to support a breakaway group of radical cigar-makers known as the Progressive Cigar-makers' Union. With their base in Chicago, the Progressive Cigar-makers advocated open rebellion against the capitalist system. The local central labor body, the Amalgamated Trades and Labor Assembly, fought the Progressive Cigar-makers bitterly for the allegiances of the Chicago's unions. The Knights openly supported the Progressive Cigar-makers against CMIU, enraging Gompers.

In the midst of the battle among the Progressive Cigar-makers, CMIU and the Amalgamated Trades, the May 1, 1886 deadline came and with it the general strike. During a peaceful labor rally protesting police violence against strikers in Chicago on May 4, a bomb was set off—killing one policeman immediately (seven others later died of their injuries. In what later became known as the Haymarket Riot, police opened fire on the crowd. Another 11 people were killed, and dozens more wounded. A large number of the unions participating in the strike on May 4 were FOTLU locals. A political backlash against the American labor movement erupted nationwide.

In the wake of the Haymarket Riot, FOTLU proposed on April 25, 1886, that a truce be established between the Knights and the federation. A letter signed by McGuire of the Carpenters; Adolph Strasser, president of CMIU; Josiah B. Dyer, general secretary of the Granite Cutters; P.J. Fitzpatrick, president of the Iron Molder's Union of North America; and W.H. Foster, secretary of FOTLU, called for a meeting to be held on May 18, 1886, in Philadelphia, Pennsylvania.

Labor peace was the public purpose of the Philadelphia meeting. But Gompers and the meeting convenors planned to use the meeting to swing union support toward an entirely new labor federation. Gompers believed that the Knights were threatening the very existence of craft unionism, and their radical attitudes were likely to bring the wrath of governmental authority down on the labor movement in the wake of the Haymarket Riot.

Twenty delegates representing more than 365,000 workers met in Philadelphia. The delegates proposed that the Knights 'agree that they would not initiate into the Order any trade union member without the permission of his union, or any other wage earner who worked for less than the prescribed wage scale of his craft, and they were also called upon to revoke the charter of any local assembly organized by workers in a trade where there was already a national union.'

At first blush, it seemed ridiculous that the Knights would agree to the proposal. The Knights were powerful, FOTLU was weak and the Knights were dismantling the federation seemingly at will. But the situation was more complex than that. A number of former FOTLU craft unions had affiliated with the Knights, and they formed a powerful and cohesive clique within the labor organization. Additionally, many of these unions had been raided by other labor organizations belonging to the Knights, or had their job actions broken by scab workers belonging to the Knights. These unions were now ready to undercut the Knights in the Philadelphia negotiations. At the same time, some important Knight leaders had quietly approached Grand Master Workman Terence V. Powderly, and convinced him of that many of FOTLU's grievances were justified. Additionally, the collapse of the Southwest rail strike was putting pressure on Powderly to seek breathing room.

Powderly not only agreed to the terms proposed by FOTLU, he left the Philadelphia meeting pledging to bring the proposal before a special convention of the Knights which would meet in Cleveland, Ohio on May 24, 1886. But delegates to the Cleveland convention, dominated by anti-craft union activists, never permitted the agreement to come up for discussion. Instead, delegates passed a resolution ordering Powderly to defend the organization at all costs and expel any member who did not support the Knights.

== Formation of the American Federation of Labor ==
Negotiations between the two organizations continued for four months. Powderly pledged not to interfere in FOTLU affairs. But craft union members of the Knights were incensed at the treatment their fellow Knights had given them in Cleveland, and they continued to undermine the organization's leadership from within.

The regular General Assembly of the Knights of Labor met in Richmond, Virginia in October 1886. Once more, Powderly was unable to bring the Philadelphia agreement up for debate or a vote. Anti-craft union delegates passed a resolution ordering all members of the Cigar-Makers' International Union to leave that organization and join the Progressive Cigar-makers or forfeit their membership in the Knights. Another resolution set up new national assemblies of craft union members, a direct challenge to FOTLU's international unions.

The action of the Knights spurred the craft unions into action. McGuire, Strasser, Dyer, Fitzpatrick and Foster issued a national to all craft trade unions to hold a national conference in Columbus, Ohio on December 8, 1886. Forty-two delegates from 25 labor organizations, 13 national unions and 12 local unions and city labor councils assembled in Columbus.

Gompers and the FOTLU executive board held their convention at the same time. Gompers and the executive committee congratulated the 20 FOTLU delegates on the organization's success in advocating for an eight-hour day. Then the organization dissolved itself. It turned over its treasury of $248.97 and all its property to the other delegates.

The other delegates then declared themselves to be the American Federation of Labor. Although many at the time argued that FOTLU merged with the AFL, the AFL was in fact a continuation of the FOTLU.

== Leadership ==
=== Secretaries ===
1881: William H. Foster
1883: Frank Keyes Foster
1884: Gabriel Edmonston
1885: William H. Foster
1886: John S. Kirchner

=== Presidents ===
1881: Richard Powers
1882: Samuel Gompers
1883: Patrick H. McLogan
1884: William McClelland
1885: Samuel Gompers

=== Treasurers ===
1881: Alexander C. Rankin
1882: Robert Howard
1885: Gabriel Edmonston

== See also ==
- Labor federation competition in the U.S.
- Federation of Organized Trades and Labor Unions (FOTLU) of the United States and Canada, and American Federation of Labor (AFL), Early Federation records at the University of Maryland Libraries
