= Martin A. Foran =

American politician

Martin Ambrose Foran
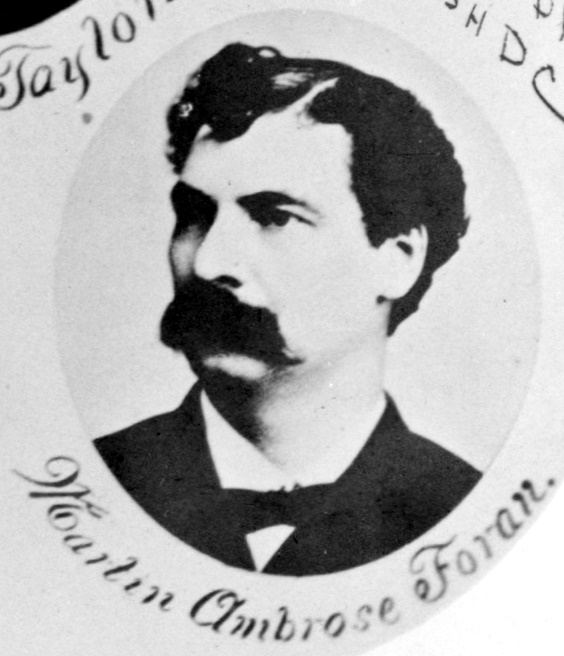

Member of the U.S. House of Representatives from Ohio's 21st district
- In office March 4, 1883 – March 3, 1889
- Preceded by: John Bingham
- Succeeded by: Theodore E. Burton

Personal details
- Born: November 11, 1844 Susquehanna County, Pennsylvania
- Died: June 28, 1921 (aged 76) Cleveland, Ohio
- Resting place: Lake View Cemetery
- Party: Democratic
- Spouse(s): Kate Kavanaugh; Emma Kennedy
- Children: Two
- Education: St. Joseph's College
- Occupation: Judge, Cooper

Martin Ambrose Foran (November 11, 1844 – June 28, 1921) was an American lawyer, jurist, politician, and Civil War veteran who served as a U.S. representative from Ohio for three terms from 1883 to 1889.

== Early life and education ==
Foran was born in Choconut Township, Susquehanna County, Pennsylvania. He lived on his father's farm and learned the art of coopering. Foran attended the public schools and St. Joseph's College.

He taught school three years and also spent two years in Ireland.

== Civil War ==
He served as a private in the Fourth Regiment, Pennsylvania Volunteer Cavalry, from April 1864 to July 1865.

== Career ==
After the war, he taught for a few months. He found work as a cooper at Meadville, Pennsylvania, and moved to Cleveland, Ohio, March 11, 1868. He was prominent in his trade and was president of the Coopers' International Union, and editor of the Coopers Journal from 1870 to 1874. He served as a member of the State constitutional convention of Ohio in 1873. He studied law. He was admitted to the bar in 1874 and commenced practice in Cleveland. He served as prosecuting attorney for the city of Cleveland 1875–1877.

=== Congress ===
Foran was elected as a Democrat to the Forty-eighth, Forty-ninth, and Fiftieth Congresses (March 4, 1883 – March 4, 1889). He was not a candidate for reelection.

== Later career and death ==
He resumed the practice of law in Cleveland, Ohio. He served as judge of the court of common pleas from January 1911 until his death in Cleveland, Ohio, June 28, 1921.

He was interred in Lake View Cemetery.

== Family life ==
On December 29, 1868, Foran married Kate Kavanaugh. They had daughters named Gertrude M. and Margaret O. After Kate died, Foran married Emma Kennedy, December 1893. He was member of the B.P.O.E., Grand Army of the Republic, and the Catholic Church.

== Sources ==
- United States Congress. "Martin A. Foran (id: F000254)". Biographical Directory of the United States Congress.

U.S. House of Representatives
| Preceded by John Bingham | Member of the U.S. House of Representatives from New York's 21st congressional district 1883-1889 | Succeeded by Theodore E. Burton |
