= Márk Szalatnay =

Márk Szalatnay was a Hungarian-Canadian trade union organizer. Born in Hungary to a Protestant schoolteacher, he was expelled from the University of Budapest in 1836 for spreading the ideals of the American Revolution and French Revolution. A supporter of the Hungarian Revolution of 1848, he fled to the United Kingdom after its failure. In the UK, he was involved in the Chartism and spent six years as secretary of the South Wales Miners’ Union. In 1855, the UK deported Szalatnay as an "undesirable alien" to the United States, where he ended up in Baltimore. He was disabled while protesting for the abolition of slavery. A strong supporter of Manifesto of the Communist Party put forth by Karl Marx and Friedrich Engels, he worked as a cigarmaker and sought for the U.S. labor movement to embrace those ideals. In 1865, he and a group of other Hungarian workers emigrated to Montreal where they organized a branch of the Cigar Makers' International Union. He organized locals of the Cigarmakers in Toronto as well as Montreal. He eventually joined the National Labor Union, the first national labor federation in the United States. He was shot and killed in Los Angeles during a strike of bakery workers in 1875. He was one of the founders of the labour movement in Canada as well as an early proponent of revolutionary socialism and international labour solidarity.
