= Cigar makers' strike of 1877 =

American campaign

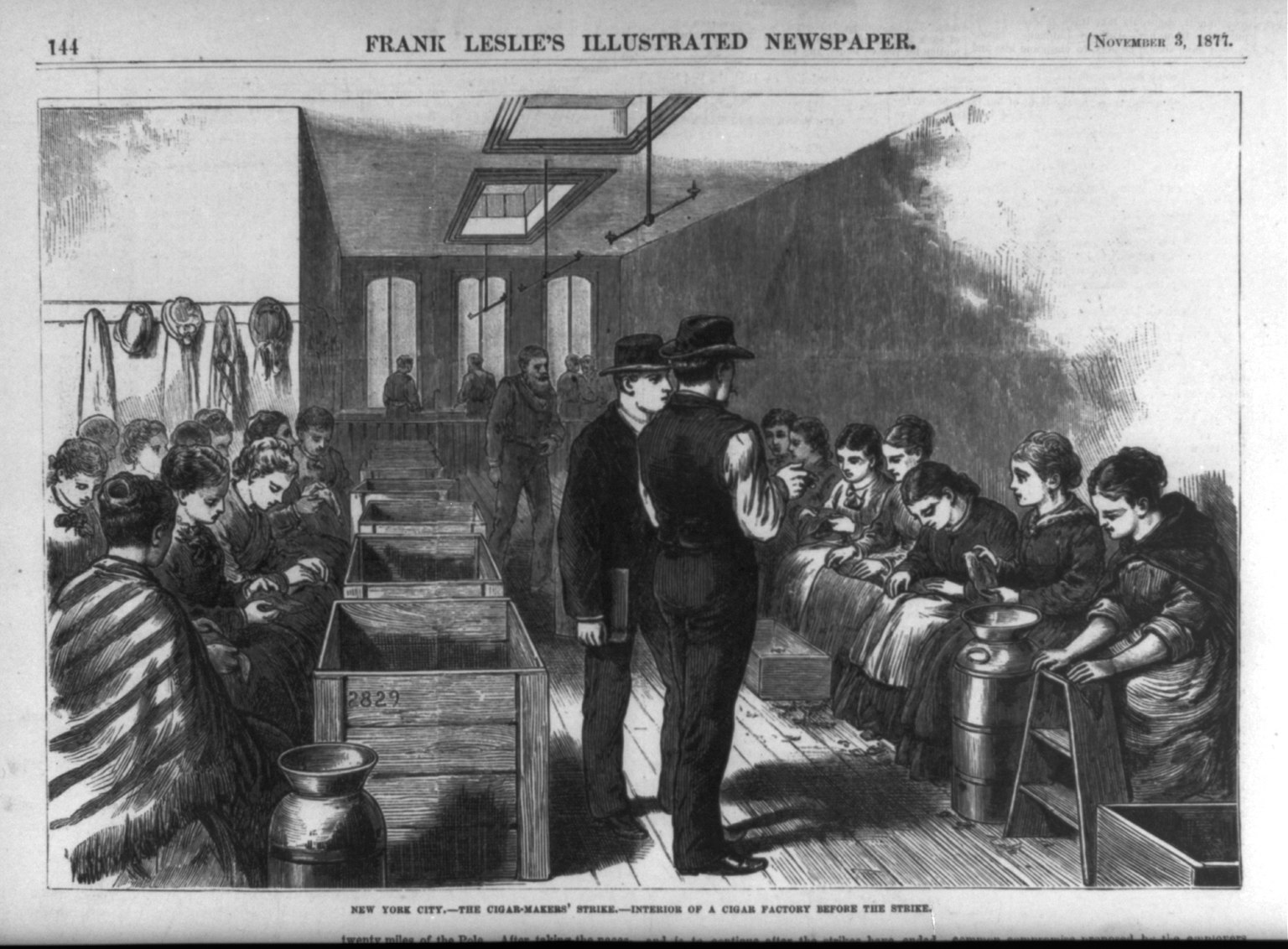
- Interior of a cigar factory before the strike from Frank Leslie's Illustrated Newspaper
- Date: October 1877 – February 1878
- Location: New York City

The cigar makers' strike of New York lasted from mid-October 1877 until mid-February 1878. Ten thousand workers walked out at the height of the strike, demanding better wages, shorter hours and better working conditions, especially in the tenement manufacturing locations. The strike was supported by the Cigar Makers International Union (CMIU) of America, local chapter 144.

Cigar-making evolved from skilled, hand-rolled craftsmanship to mechanized production due to technological and economic factors. Initially concentrated in Cuba, South America and the United States, the industry thrived in the 18th and 19th centuries, with workers facing harsh tenement conditions. The 1863 introduction of cigar molds allowed relatively unskilled laborers to work at cigar factories. Labor unions like the CMIU emerged, supporting strikes for better wages and hours, including the 1877 strike. Despite some gains, strikes and rising costs led companies to adopt mechanization. By the late 19th century, cigar-making machines similar to James Albert Bonsack's cigarette roller began to replace workers, diminishing union power. By 1931, most hand-rolled cigar production ceased, and the CMIU dissolved in 1974.

== Background ==
A cigar is in essence a bundle of rolled cured tobacco leaves. The rolling process can be done by hand, creating a more expensive luxury item, or in a factory. The factory method produces more uniform shapes and is much less expensive. Demand for cigars was high during the 18th and 19th century. The demand created a specialized workforce, first in Cuba and South America. In the mid to late 1800s more workers in the United States were taught in the art of cigar making. Rolling a cigar is a skilled labor; it can take up to one year for an apprentice to master the art and become proficient in rolling a cigar.

By the 1840s, tenements had sprung up in larger cities along the east coast of the United States. These were larger rooms within an apartment or house that were exclusively used for work. The tenements usually belonged to the owner of the factory, and apartments were rented to the employees at a high rate. The tenements also produced unhealthy and unsanitary living conditions. By the late 1800s, the art of cigar making had moved to larger factories, making it more efficient for cigar companies in both labor and overall cost.

1863 saw the introduction of a cigar-making mold into the industry. Now relatively unskilled workers could perform the task of rolling a cigar. This led to a large influx of women and young adults into the cigar-making factories. The workers were trained in only one aspect of the cigar-making process. One group broke up the leaves to make the filler, the next group selected the leaves for the rolling process, the next group fed it all into the roller, and the last group finished the product.

In 1864, the Cigar Makers International Union of America (CMIU) was formed by several delegates of local cigar maker unions. The delegates came from New York City, Boston, Philadelphia, Baltimore, and several other cities. Only those companies making hand-rolled cigars were allowed to join. In 1869, internal fighting caused several members to form a new Union called the United Cigar Makers of New York (UCMNY). Anybody could join this union, whether the cigar was made by hand or with the help of a machine. In 1875, CMIU President George Hurst called for a joint meeting of the two groups in the first issue of the Cigar Makers Official Journal. At this meeting; the UCMNY affiliated with the CMIU and was designated Local 144; its president was Samuel Gompers, and the financial secretary was Adolph Strasser. The CMIU's Local 144 would play a significant role in the formation of the American Federation of Labor.

By 1873, the United States' economy took a downturn. Misguided investments into areas that proved to yield less profit than anticipated caused banks to default on loans. In the fall of 1873, customers of banks in New York had difficulty withdrawing their money from their banks. In September, one of the most trusted financial institutions in New York, Jay Cooke & Company, failed and caused a panic that spread eventually beyond New York.

== The strike ==
The financial crisis of the 1870s caused major strikes across all industries. Most notable was the Great Railroad Strike of 1877. In her book “Once a Cigar Maker” Patricia Ann Cooper suggests that the cigar makers may have been inspired by this railroad strike Whatever the inspiration was, by October 1877 over 10,000 women and men had left the factories and tenement rooms and were on strike. They rallied for shorter hours and better wages. The CMIU (Cigar Makers Union of America) supported the strike.

The book Woman and child wage-earners in the United States, Volume IX gives a glimpse into the working conditions in the factories. It states that the working girls were paid by the piece, were of ill health, and in a “low state of morals”, the ill health being caused by the “poisonous odor of the tobacco in an atmosphere filled with the fine particles of the plant. The report states that the average wage for a New York cigar maker in 1877 was about $3 per week. In Salem, Massachusetts the weekly wage was $6. The report also suggests that “much of the prostitution which curses the city is the loathsome fruit of the depravity which dates its commencement at the tobacco factories."

According to Charles P. Neill, author of Woman and child wage-earners, factory owners replaced their striking workers (most of whom, by Neill's account, were 'Bohemians', or immigrants displaced by the Austro-Prussian War in 1866), with "American girls." Cigars manufactured by these strike-breakers allegedly bore a label emblazoned with the slogan "These cigars were made by American girls,” a ruse that, by factory-owner opinion, boosted the popularity of those products.

== Results of the strike ==
The Daily Alta, a California newspaper, reported in December 1877 that the cigar makers strike didn't make much of a difference. The skilled workers came back, and the Bohemians “who can only produce a very poor cigar” were let go. The newspaper reported that strikes “do not seem to flourish” and that the employers did not suffer much of a loss. Some employers were able to wait out the strike, because they had enough stock on hand. Others simply moved the manufacturing process to a different state. The New York Times, the New-York Tribune, and The New York Sun reported the rough and unfair treatment of the strikers in the streets. The police pushed striking women down, causing a pregnant striker to go into premature labor. They also evicted presumed leaders from their homes as a warning to other tenement workers. The strike ended in February 1878. They had gained “reduced hours of labor, increased employment, higher wages and decreased exposure to the tenement system and its unhealthy products." Employers were glad to get their old hands back”.

In August 1881, Gompers, Strasser and several other CMIU delegates met with representatives from other trade unions in Terre Haute, Indiana, to discuss the possibility of uniting into a single union. In November 1881, they met in Pittsburgh and formed the Federation of Organized Trades and Labor Unions of the United States of America and Canada. It held five annual conventions. In 1886, it merged with the American Federation of Labor, and Gompers was elected President. In 1891 George W. Perkins was elected president of the CMIU, a post he would hold until 1927.

In response, U.S. tobacco companies producing low-priced (5-cent) cigars continued the practice of hiring and training female cigar workers in preference to men, believing that women "don't drink" and were more reliable, more careful in their work, and more easily managed. The exclusionary attitudes of male union members to females joining the unions meant that most female workers were not union members. Additionally, the vast majority of female cigar workers did not smoke cigars, thus saving manufacturers the customary three free cigars per day given to male cigar rollers for their personal consumption. However, the preference for women workers did not solve the problem of increasing labor and tobacco costs, and a rise in the number of strikes by female employees in the low-priced cigar industry after 1910 meant that factory owners could no longer count on the docility of women workers.

In the end, the decisive blow to cigar maker unions came from technology. As early as 1880, continued strikes, walkouts, and the steadily rising costs of labor and tobacco leaf caused U.S. tobacco companies to invest in mechanized methods of producing cigarettes and cigars. The first cigarette rolling machine was introduced in 1880 by James Albert Bonsack, while the cigar-making machine first appeared in 1889. As prices of cigarettes and cigars fell, cigar-making unions lost thousands of members; an estimated 56,000 jobs were lost between 1921 and 1935. Scores of union factories went out of business, while the remainder declared an open shop. In 1931, the American Cigar Co., the only USA-based cigar factory still using hand-rolling techniques, ceased manufacture. In that same year, the CMIU, once one of the most powerful of labor unions, reported only 15,000 enrolled members, a figure that would continue to decline until the union's final merger and dissolution in 1974.
