= James E. Hatfield =

American labor union leader

James Ernest Hatfield (March 29, 1931 – February 4, 2007) was an American labor union leader.

Born in Wilkerson, Pennsylvania, Hatfield began working for the Kimble Glass Company in Columbus, Ohio when he was 22 years old. He joined the Glass Bottle Blowers Association (GBBA), serving various roles in his local union. He then became a full-time organizer for the international union, and next, an area director. In 1974, he was elected as the union's international secretary-treasurer.

Hatfield was elected as president of the GBBA in 1977. As leader of the union, he negotiated a merger with the International Brotherhood of Pottery and Allied Workers. This was completed in 1982, forming the Glass, Pottery, Plastics and Allied Workers' International Union, with Hatfield becoming its founding president. He also served as a vice-president of the AFL-CIO from 1981, and as president of the federation's Union Label and Service Trades Department from 1982. He retired as leader of the union in 1994, and from the AFL-CIO in 1997.

Trade union offices
Preceded by Harry A. Tulley	President of the Glass Bottle Blowers' Association; 1977–1982	Succeeded by Union merged
Preceded by Union founded	President of the Glass, Pottery, Plastics and Allied Workers' International Union; 1982–1988	Succeeded by Union merged
Preceded by Union founded	President of the Glass, Molders, Pottery, Plastics and Allied Workers International Union; 1988–1994	Succeeded by Frank W. Carter
Preceded by John E. Mara	President of the Union Label Department; 1982–1997	Succeeded by Charles Mercer
