= Martin Fox =

Martin Fox may refer to:

- Martin Fox (labor leader) (1848–1907), American labor union leader
- Martin Fox (businessman) (died 1966), gambling operator and owner of the Tropicana Club in Havana, Cuba
- Martin S. Fox (1924–2020), American publisher who served as president of the Jewish Telegraphic Agency
- Thomas Martin Fox (1893–1967), Australian Catholic bishop
