= Glass, Pottery, Plastics and Allied Workers' International Union =

Labor union

The Glass, Pottery, Plastics and Allied Workers' International Union (GPPAW) was a labor union representing manufacturing workers in various industries in the United States and Canada.

The union was founded on August 5, 1982, with the merger of the Glass Bottle Blowers' Association and the International Brotherhood of Pottery and Allied Workers. Like both its predecessors, it was chartered by the American Federation of Labor. On May 1, 1988, the union merged with the International Molders and Allied Workers' Union, to form the Glass, Molders, Pottery, Plastics and Allied Workers' International Union.

Throughout its existence, the union was led by president James E. Hatfield.
