= John S. Kirchner =

American labor unionist

John S. Kirchner (1857 – 1912) was an American labor unionist.

Kirchner was born in Maryland, to a German family. He became a cigar maker, and in 1877, he joined a local of the Knights of Labor. He joined the Cigar Makers' International Union (CMIU), organizing local 100 in Philadelphia. He was also active in the Philadelphia Central Labor Union, serving as its financial secretary in the mid-1880s.

In 1885, Kirchner became the fourth vice-president of the CMIU, and its full-time organizer for Pennsylvania. Politically, he was considered to have anarchist sympathies, something which proved controversial with some other labor unionists. However, in 1886, William H. Foster, secretary of the Federation of Organized Trades and Labor Unions (FOTLU), died, and Kirchner was appointed to complete his term. This was the leading position in the country's largest labor federation.

John S. Kirchner Gone www.newspapers.com/article/the-philadelphia-times-john-s-kirchner-g/19091275/

A few months after Kirchner became secretary of FOTLU, it was reorganized as the American Federation of Labor. He was nominated as secretary of the new organization, but refused the nomination. In 1887, he left his labor union posts, but remained a member of the union. In 1902, local 100 merged into local 165, of which he became a member until his death, in 1912.

Trade union offices
Preceded by William H. Foster	Secretary of the Federation of Organized Trades and Labor Unions; 1886	Succeeded by Federation reorganized
