= John R. Alpine =

American labor union leader

John R. Alpine (1863 – April 20, 1947) was an American labor union leader.

Born in Portland, Maine, Alpine became a gas fitter in Everett, Massachusetts. He then moved to Boston, where joined the United Association of Journeymen Plumbers, Gas Fitters, Steam Fitters, and Steam Fitters' Helpers (UA), becoming a special organizer for the union, and president of his local in 1904. That year, he was also elected as a vice-president of the international union, while in 1905, he became president of the Boston Building Trades Council.

In 1906, Alpine was elected as president of the UA, moving to Chicago. In 1909, he also became a vice-president of the American Federation of Labor. He served on the Cantonment Adjustment Commission during World War I. He also served on the board of governors of the American Construction Council. He stood down from his labor union posts in 1919, to attend the Paris Peace Conference as a labor advisor to Woodrow Wilson.

Alpine next joined Grinnell Service, as assistant to the president for labor relations. In 1931, he was appointed as a special advisor to the United States Secretary of Labor, with responsibility for overseeing the Federal Employment Service. He then returned to Grinnell, where he worked until his death, in 1947.

Trade union offices
Preceded by William M. Merrick	President of the United Association; 1906–1919	Succeeded by John Coefield
Preceded by Joseph F. Valentine	Seventh Vice-President of the American Federation of Labor; 1909–1913	Succeeded by John Phillip White
Preceded by William Huber	Fifth Vice-President of the American Federation of Labor; 1913–1917	Succeeded by Henry B. Perham
Preceded by Joseph F. Valentine	Fourth Vice-President of the American Federation of Labor; 1917–1918	Succeeded by Frank Duffy
Preceded by Joseph F. Valentine	Third Vice-President of the American Federation of Labor; 1918–1919	Succeeded by Frank Duffy
