= Canadian Association of Industrial Mechanical and Allied Workers =

Trade union

- Abbreviation: CAIMAW
- Predecessor: International Molders and Foundry Workers Union of North America
- Merged into: Canadian Auto Workers
- Formation: 1964
- Dissolved: 1992
- Type: Trade union
- Headquarters: Winnipeg, Manitoba, Canada; Vancouver, British Columbia, Canada
- Location: Canada
- Members: Approx. 6,500 (1991)
- Affiliations: Confederation of Canadian Unions

The Canadian Association of Industrial Mechanical and Allied Workers (CAIMAW) was a trade union in Canada. Formed in Winnipeg, Manitoba, in 1964, it was a breakaway from the International Molders and Foundry Workers Union of North America. The Canadian Electrical Workers Union merged into CAIMAW in 1969. In 1971, the union joined the left-wing Council of Canadian Unions, which became the Confederation of Canadian Unions in 1973. CAIMAW was part of the larger trend of unionization in Canada which emphasized independence from the United States–dominated international union movement as well as increased organizational democracy. In 1991, it had a membership of approximately 6,500, which voted 82 per cent in favour of merging into the newly independent Canadian Auto Workers.
