= Glass Bottle Blowers' Association =

Labor union in the United States

The Glass Bottle Blowers' Association (GBBA) was a labor union representing workers involved in making blown glass in the United States and Canada. The union was formed in 1891.

== Origins ==
=== Early glassmakers' unions ===
In 1842, craftsmen in Philadelphia, Pennsylvania, formed a glass blowers' union that represented workers throughout the region. John Samuels was elected the first president. Several other local glass blowers' unions joined the nascent national union, which adopted the name Glass Blowers' League. The union represented workers who made soda-lime glass (or "green glass"). The new national union slowly disintegrated over the following quarter century, but glass blowers met again in 1866 and affirmed their affiliation to the Glass Blowers' League and its 1842 constitution. The reinvigorated union also changed its name to the Druggists' Ware Glass Blowers' League. Membership was largely centered in the states of New Jersey and Pennsylvania, then the center of the glass industry in the U.S.

The glass blowers faced a major challenge in the 1880s from a new union, the American Flint Glass Workers' Union of North America (AFGWU). Flint glass, commonly known as "crystal", was made in closed pots to protect the glass from impurities (unlike green glass), and generally the flint glass workforce was more highly skilled. The AFGWU formed in Pittsburgh in 1878, and within four short years had locals throughout West Virginia and Ohio and was spreading east. Feeling threatened by the new union, the Glass Blowers waged several bitter jurisdictional strikes against the AFGWU in the 1880s and 1890s. The union's jurisdictional fight was an important one. Highly skilled workers like glass blowers made up 15 percent of the entire workforce. While 45 percent of American workers made just enough money in the 1880s to be at or above the poverty line ($500 a year), another 30 percent made less than that. A shocking 10 percent of all full-time workers made so little money they were considered absolutely destitute. Glass blowers, however, made 60 to 100 percent more than the average worker, and were considered the "cream" of the working class.

=== Joining the Knights of Labor ===
The union was also confronting a diversifying glass industry. Newer glassworks tended to be better capitalized, and paid workers better. Distinct differences between glassworks in the east and west emerged, and the union created an eastern and western division in 1884 to accommodate these industry changes. The eastern division of the Druggists' Ware Glass Blowers' League dissolved in 1886 and joined District 149 of the Knights of Labor (KOL), while the western division dissolved in 1889 and joined KOL District 143. An independent union of glass blowers, the "Western Green League", formed in western Pennsylvania around 1880 but merged with the Knights of Labor in 1886 as well.

Child labor and apprenticeships were major issues for the union in the 1880s as well. One in four workers in the green glass industry was a child. Apprenticeships in the green glass factories lasted four years. But the apprentice system was operated by the employers, who took on large numbers of apprentices in order to flood the market with skilled workers and thus put a downward pressure on wages. After the merger with the Knights of Labor in 1886, the glass workers' union struck to win control over the apprenticeship system. The eastern District 149 demanded one apprentice for every 15 workers, but the western District 143 accepted two. The strike lasted into 1887, and the eastern District 149 glass blowers—angry over the employer-friendly stand taken by the western district—disaffiliated from the KOL. Employers instituted a lockout against the eastern workers. At an employer-union conference in 1887, a compromise was reached. The union not only won agreement on the apprentice issue but also an industry-wide agreement setting uniform wages and work rules. The agreement even listed the physical movements all workers would be expected to do.

=== Forming the Glass Bottle Blowers' Association ===
In 1891, after four years of labor unrest, the two KOL glass blowers' divisions merged to become the United Green Glass Workers' Association of the United States and Canada. The glass blowers disaffiliated from the KOL in 1895 and formed a new, independent union, the Glass Bottle Blowers' Association (GBBA) of the United States and Canada. Denis A. Hayes was elected the new union's president in 1896, a position he held for the next three decades. The GBBA affiliated with the American Federation of Labor (AFL) in 1899.

== History of the modern union ==
=== Affiliations and jurisdiction ===
The GBBA struck the glass blowing industry in a lengthy strike from April 8, 1899, to July 1, 1900, that led to the unionization of all but two glass plants. By 1900, the GBBA had 61 local unions and 4,300 members. The GBBA, with the consent of the American Flint Glass Workers' Union (AFGWU), affiliated the Prescription Glass Blowers' department of the AFGWU. In 1906, one scholar of trade union activity noted that the GBBA tended to hold regional or national strikes, and only rarely struck individual employers.

Disputes with the AFGWU did not end, however. Mechanization tended to eliminate the skill differences between flint glass and green glass workers, and the two unions clashed repeatedly over who should represent glass industry workers. Bottle and fruit jar manufacturing had long been "green glass work", but now the two unions enter into a bitter dispute over who should represent workers in this section of the industry. When the American Federation of Labor (AFL) ruled in favor of the GBBA, the AFGWU disaffiliated from the AFL on January 30, 1903. As an independent union, the AFGWU tried to organize these workers but lacked the support and protection which the national trade union center gave the GBBA. The AFGWU reaffiliated with the AFL October 21, 1912, after renouncing its claims to bottle and fruit jar workers.

=== The challenge of mechanization ===
In 1904, Michael Joseph Owens received the first American patent for an automatic glass bottle blowing machine, which transformed the glass bottle and jar industry. The GBBA strongly opposed mechanization, but there was little they could do to stop new companies from employing the technology. Mechanization turned glassmaking from a skilled profession to an unskilled one. Output tripled, and so many workers were needed that the surplus of apprentices was more than easily absorbed. But as bottle-making became an unskilled profession, the GBBA responded by allowing union wage rates to fall dramatically.

Between the Panic of 1907 and World War I, the GBBA found itself struggling. Employment (and membership) dropped sharply due to bad economic conditions. As more and more states and large cities adopted Prohibition laws, the need for bottles fell drastically, causing even more unemployment and membership losses for the union., Mechanization worsened the unemployment situation, as companies developed procedures that allowed molten glass to flow directly from the furnace into the molding and blowing machines. By 1920, the hand blower and hand-operated glass-making machine were nearly eliminated. Although the union had organized 95 percent of worksites employing hand-blown or hand-operated machines, it had but a single contract at an automated company.

To counteract the membership problem, the GBBA began organizing all workers in glass factories, not just blowers. This was a major change for the union. Previously, the GBBA had adhered to a philosophy known as craft unionism, in which a narrow set of highly skilled glassworkers were organized by the union. These highly paid workers generated significant dues, and their specialized skills and homogeneous socio-economic and ethnic backgrounds made them easy to organize. But by 1916, the union had shifted to a new philosophy, industrial unionism, in which all workers in the glass industry were potential members of the union. This included semi-skilled and even unskilled workers, such as bottle sorters, helpers, and packers. By 1916, unskilled workers were organized in 16 different plants. Organizing successes included those at the Whitall-Tatum plant in East Stroudsburg, Pennsylvania, and the George Jonas Glass Co. in Minotola, New Jersey—both of which had resisted unionization for decades.

=== Prohibition ===
World War I proved to be a boon for the union. Immigration from Europe to the United States almost came to a stop, eliminating a major source of cheap labor. Additionally, major production increases necessitated by the war effort led to significant wage increases, extensive overtime, and many new hires. But adoption of the Eighteenth Amendment and passage of the Volstead Act led to nationwide Prohibition in 1920. The need for glass dropped precipitously, leading to major membership losses and wage decreases.

When John Maloney was elected president of the GBBA in 1924, the union was in crisis. With just 1,800 members and the union running a large budget deficit, Maloney cut the salaries of officers and staff, eliminated staff, and canceled publication of the union magazine. He also began working with the United Brewery Workers to repeal the Eighteenth Amendment. Building a coalition against Prohibition took a full decade. At Congressional hearings in 1926, few witnesses spoke against Prohibition, and those who did emphasized the law's impact on personal liberty (rather than employment). By 1930, the Glass Blowers and Brewery Workers had organized a much larger coalition of labor unions—which included, at last, the AFL itself—to speak out against the amendment, and they began emphasizing the negative economic, employment, and tax revenue impacts of the law. In 1932, the Glass Blowers, the Amalgamated Lithographers of America, and the Allied Association of Hotel and Stewards' Associations openly lobbied for Prohibition's repeal before Congress.

The repeal of Prohibition in 1933 and the advent of World War II greatly improved the economics of the glass industry, and led to widespread re-employment of glass workers. The GBBA responded with a strong organizing effort. The 1933 National Industrial Recovery Act protected union organizing activity for the first time. A 1931 conference had given the GBBA the exclusive right to organize the 12,000 workers in the 21 plants of the Owens-Illinois company (which manufactured 60 percent of all glass containers in the U.S.), and the union slowly began organizing Owens-Illinois. The invention of the neon sign and its immense popularity not only generated an intense demand for skilled glass workers, but also boosted wages. Employers often offered double what the collective bargaining agreement required. By 1936, the glass blowers' union has organized 90 percent of all workers in the neon sign industry. But in 1937, the International Brotherhood of Electrical Workers challenged the GBBA's right to the neon sign workers. It won, and by 1938 nearly all of the neon sign locals had left the GBBA.

Union membership continued to grow, however, and by 1939 reached 18,000. Organizing efforts were greatly assisted by a neutrality agreement reached with bottle makers in October 1937. By 1945, the GBBA had organized 90 percent of its jurisdiction in the glass industry. Union membership had risen to more than 35,000, and the union had nearly $1 million in its treasury.

=== Organizational change in the post-war period ===
Organizational issues vexed the union in the 1940s. In 1940, the union expanded its executive board to nine members from eight, which gave a seat to locals on the West Coast. The formation of the Congress of Industrial Organizations (CIO) in 1935 also created problems. Several CIO unions—including the International Longshore and Warehouse Union, the Federation of Flat Glass Workers, the International Union of Mine, Mill, and Smelter Workers, and United Mine Workers—all challenged the GBBA during organizing elections, and attempted to raid existing GBBA locals.

President Maloney retired in 1946 in ill health. He was succeeded by Lee Minton. With the union having organized every single plant in the glass container industry, Minton won the membership's approval to re-establish the union newsletter for the first time since 1924. In 1950, Minton won another victory when the union established its first pension plan for its members.

The post-war era saw additional pressures on the glass industry. Beer was now being sold in tin cans rather than bottles, and milk was delivered in waxed cardboard cartons. The union began organizing outside its traditional jurisdiction for the first time. The union reasoned that it was not glass that gave the union its unique nature, but blowing and molding. Subsequently, it began organizing in the fiberglass and plastics industry for the first time. Seven locals of fiberglass workers were organized in 1949. By 1953, the union had organized 75 percent of all fiberglass plants in the United States, and its total membership had risen to 45,000.

The AFL and the CIO merged in 1955. The GBBA was one of the first unions to take advantage of the unification, and in opened merger talks with its CIO counterpart. In March 1957, the CIO's 32,000-member United Glass and Ceramic Workers of North America merged with the 52,000-member GBBA.

=== Strikes in the 1960s ===
More than 75 years of labor peace in the glass industry ended in 1965. In March of that year, the GMPIU struck at 86 glass plants east of the Rocky Mountains. The strike lasted 11 days, and involved 32,000 workers. The union won a 15 percent wage increase over three years, establishment of an industry-wide health and life insurance plan, and pension portability for workers who are at least 40 years of age, have 15 years of service, and are laid off due to automation or permanent plant shutdown. A pact for West Coast workers achieved a 21.8 percent wage increase over three years. The agreement included a clause under which employers either offered a 10 percent production bonus plan or were forced to raise base wages another 20 percent.

The union struck again in February 1968, walking out at 95 percent of all glass factories nationwide. This strike lasted 51 days. Glass container workers won a hefty 15.7 to 24 percent wage increase, and a major increase in the employer contribution to the pension plan. Machine operators won a 10.8 to 13.9 percent wage increase. The wage increases led to an increase in the price of glass, however.

=== Gender consolidation and mergers of the 1970s and 1980s ===
Into the early 1970s, the GBBA maintained several locals which were segregated by gender. However, in Local No. 106, Glass Bottle Blowers Association, AFL–CIO (Owens-Illinois, Inc.) and Local No. 245, Glass Bottle Blowers Association, AFL–CIO (Owens-Illinois, Inc.) 210 NLRB 943 (1974), the National Labor Relations Board ruled that gender-segregated locals violated the right of workers to elect representatives of their own choosing, and the locals were merged.

Mechanization, the movement away from glass containers, and the movement of manufacturing to emerging nations with cheaper labor costs led many unions in the ceramics, glass, and pottery industries to rapidly lose members. The AFL–CIO established a Stone, Glass and Clay Coordinating Committee to coordinate the collective bargaining activities of these shrinking unions and strengthen their activities in this area. The coordinating committee also encouraged union mergers. This latter effort had some success. In 1975, the former Glass Bottle Blowers Association (GBBA) merged with the Window Glass Cutters' League of America.

In 1982, the International Brotherhood of Pottery and Allied Workers merged with the Glass Bottle Blowers Association to form the Glass, Pottery, Plastics and Allied Workers' International Union (GPPAW).

== Headquarters ==
The GBBA had no headquarters until 1895, when it rented a single room at 119 South 4th Street in Philadelphia, Pennsylvania. A few years later, the union moved into the historic Witherspoon Building at 1319-1323 Walnut Street in Philadelphia. A short time later, it rented larger quarters in the Witherspoon Building.

The union eventually moved into the Philadelphia Savings Fund Society Building at 12 South 12th Street in the 1930s. But within 20 years, it, too, had grown too small. In 1953, the union purchased the 18-story Lanesborough Building at 226 South 16th Street in Philadelphia. It occupied two floors in the structure, and rented out the rest to generate income.

The Lanesborough Building was deteriorating by 1975, so the union sold it and moved to space at 608 East Baltimore Pike in Media, Pennsylvania.

== Presidents of the union ==
John Samuels is generally recognized as the first "president" of the glass blowers' union, elected in 1842. But the present union traces its existence to 1876 and the election of Samuel Simpson as its first president. The list of presidents of the union includes:

- Samuel Simpson – 1876 to 1880
- Louis Arrington – 1880 to 1894
- Joseph D. Troth – 1894 to 1896
- Denis A. Hayes – 1896 to 1917
- John A. Voll – 1917 to 1924
- James Maloney – 1924 to 1946
- Lee W. Minton – 1946 to 1971
- Newton W. Black – 1971 to 1974
- Harry A. Tulley – 1974 to 1977
- James E. Hatfield – 1977 to 1982

== Bibliography ==
- Bonnett, Clarence E. History of Employers' Associations in the United States. New York: Vantage Press, 1956.
- Chaison, Gary N. Union Mergers in Hard Times: The View From Five Countries. Ithaca, N.Y.: ILR Press, 1996.
- Colman, Tyler. Wine Politics: How Governments, Environmentalists, Mobsters, and Critics Influence the Wines We Drink. Berkeley, Calif.: University of California Press, 2008.
- Davis, Pearce. The Development of the American Glass Industry. New York: Russell & Russell, 1949.
- Fink, Gary M. Labor Unions. Westport, Conn.: Greenwood Press, 1977.
- Flannery, James. The Glass House Boys of Pittsburgh. Pittsburgh, Pa.: University of Pittsburgh Press, 2009.
- Fones-Wolf, Ken. Glass Towns: Industry, Labor and Political Economy in Appalachia, 1890-1930s. Urbana, Ill.: University of Illinois Press, 2007.
- Gusfield, Joseph R. Symbolic Crusade: Status Politics and the American Temperance Movement. Urbana, Ill.: University of Illinois Press, 1986.
- Kaufman, Stuart Bruce; Albert, Peter J.; Palladino, Grace; and Hughes, Marla J. The Samuel Gompers Papers. Vol.8: Progress and Reaction in the Age of Reform, 1909-13. Urbana, Ill.: University of Illinois Press, 2000.
- McCabe, David A. The Standard Rate in American Trade Unions. Baltimore, Md.: Johns Hopkins Press, 1912.
- Minton, Lee W. Flame and Heart: A History of the Glass Blowers Association of the United States and Canada. Washington, D.C.: Merkle Press, 1961.
- Reef, Catherine. Working in America. New York: Facts On File, 2007.
- Sakolski, Aaron M. The Finances of American Trade Unions. Baltimore, Md.: Johns Hopkins Press, 1906.
- Skrabec, Quentin R. Edward Drummond Libbey, American Glassmaker. Jefferson, N.C.: McFarland, 2011.
- Skrabec, Quentin R. Henry Clay Frick: The Life of the Perfect Capitalist. Jefferson, N.C.: McFarland & Co., 2010.
- Skrabec, Quentin R. Michael Owens and the Glass Industry. Gretna, La.: Pelican Publishing, 2007.
- Ulman, Lloyd. The Rise of the National Trade Union: The Development and Significance of the Structure, Governing Institutions, and Economic Policies. Cambridge, Mass.: Harvard University Press, 1966.
- United States Industrial Commission. Report of the Industrial Commission. Washington, D.C.: U.S. Government Printing Office, 1902.
- A Working Woman's Guide to Her Job Rights. Darby, Pa.: Diane Publishing Books, 1992.
