= Armagh, Pennsylvania =

Borough in Pennsylvania, US

- Borough
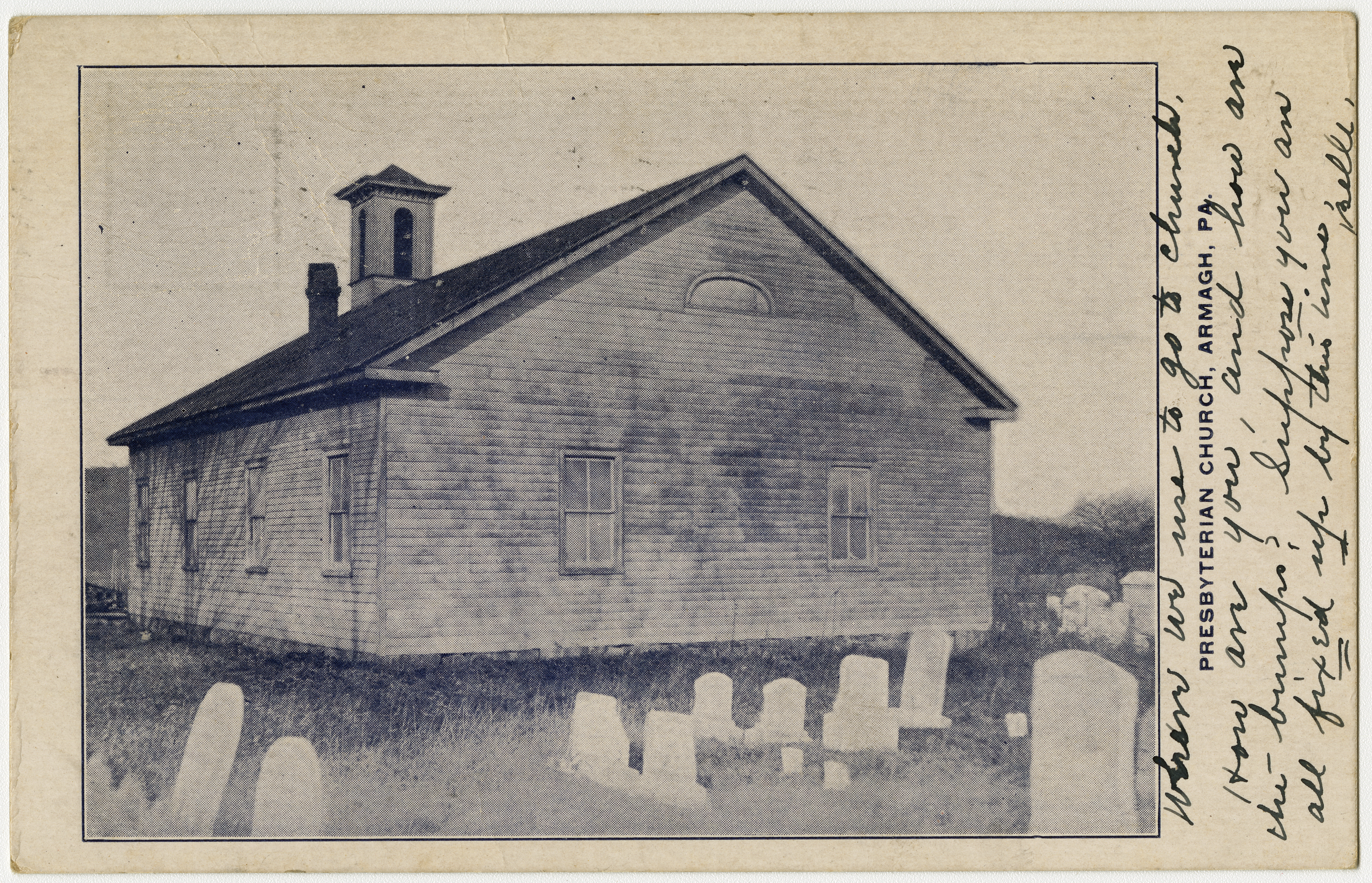
- The old Armagh Presbyterian Church was destroyed in 2004, but the cemetery remains along Route 56

- Location of Armagh in Indiana County, Pennsylvania.

- Location within Pennsylvania Location within the United States
- Coordinates: 40°27′34″N 79°01′50″W
- Country: United States
- State: Pennsylvania
- County: Indiana
- Settled: 1792
- Incorporated: 1824

Government
  - Type: Borough Council
  - Mayor: Mr. Parody

Area
  - Total: 0.058 sq mi (0.15 km^{2})
  - Land: 0.058 sq mi (0.15 km^{2})
  - Water: 0 sq mi (0.00 km^{2})

Population (2020)
  - Total: 102
  - Density: 1,777.2/sq mi (686.19/km^{2})
- Time zone: UTC-5 (Eastern (EST))
  - Summer (DST): UTC-4 (EDT)
- Zip code: 15920
- FIPS code: 42-03032

Armagh is a borough in Indiana County in the U.S. state of Pennsylvania. The population was 103 at the 2020 census.

== History ==
Armagh is the oldest community in Indiana County, having been founded in 1792 by eight families led by James and Margaret Jane Graham from Ireland. The community was named after the Irish city and county of Armagh, which was the hometown of some of the settlers. Its first school began in 1799, using a log cabin, and in 1805, it established the county's first post office.

Many of the original settlers were Presbyterian. The Wheatfield Presbyterian Church, later known simply as the Armagh Presbyterian Church, was started in 1786. The Rev. George Hill, its first minister, was installed in 1792, and was shared with churches in Fairfield and Donegal. In 1820, the congregation built a log church and in 1835–1836 replaced it with a white frame church. Another Presbyterian church was built in 1905 in Seward, approximately three miles south. The two congregations merged in 1963. The Armagh church building was destroyed in 2004 after being hit by a truck.

The community became a borough on April 10, 1824, having previously been part of East Wheatfield Township. The borough was the birthplace of pioneer American labor leader William H. Sylvis in 1828. Armagh was described in the 1940 Pennsylvania Guide as being "settled in 1792 by Irish immigrants, who found the hillside bare except for a few scrubby oaks; hence the name. In stagecoach days Armagh had almost as many taverns as it has houses today."

== Geography ==
According to the United States Census Bureau, the borough has a total area of 0.1 square miles (0.3 km^{2}), all land.

== Demographics ==
Historical population
Census	Pop.	Note	%±
1850	152		—
1860	190		25.0%
1870	177		−6.8%
1880	123		−30.5%
1890	162		31.7%
1900	131		−19.1%
1910	82		−37.4%
1920	110		34.1%
1930	123		11.8%
1940	163		32.5%
1950	176		8.0%
1960	192		9.1%
1970	165		−14.1%
1980	133		−19.4%
1990	104		−21.8%
2000	131		26.0%
2010	122		−6.9%
2020	102		−16.4%
2021 (est.)	103	▲	1.0%

As of the 2000 census, there were 131 people, 54 households, and 40 families residing in the borough. The population density was 2,301.9 inhabitants per square mile (888.8/km^{2}). There were 59 housing units at an average density of 1,036.7 per square mile (400.3/km^{2}). The racial makeup of the borough was 100.00% White.

There were 54 households, out of which 24.1% had children under the age of 18 living with them, 61.1% were married couples living together, 9.3% had a female householder with no male present, and 24.1% were non-families. 24.1% of all households were made up of individuals, and 11.1% had someone living alone who was 65 years of age or older. The average household size was 2.43 and the average family size was 2.83.

In the borough the population was spread out, with 18.3% under the age of 18, 10.7% from 18 to 24, 27.5% from 25 to 44, 23.7% from 45 to 64, and 19.8% who were 65 years of age or older. The median age was 42 years. For every 100 females there were 98.5 males. For every 100 females age 18 and over, there were 98.1 males.

The median income for a household in the borough was $31,806, and the median income for a family was $34,167. Males had a median income of $30,833 versus $24,167 for females. The per capita income for the borough was $18,309. There were 7.1% of families and 10.9% of the population living below the poverty line, including 20.0% of under eighteens and 6.9% of those over 64.
