= William H. Foster =

William Henry Foster (May 3, 1847 – 1886) was a British-born American labor union leader.

Born in Liverpool, Foster taught at a school from the age of 15. In 1862, he moved to Portadown to undertake an apprenticeship as a printer. He returned to Liverpool to complete this, also joining the Liverpool Typographical Society. He then became a journeyman, and found work in Buxton, before in October 1873 emigrating to the United States. He stayed briefly in Philadelphia, then moved to Cincinnati, where he worked on the Cincinnati Gazette, but left in 1874 during a lock-out.

Foster returned to work in Philadelphia, before in 1877 going back to Cincinnati, to work on the Cincinnati Enquirer. Active in the International Typographical Union (ITU), in 1878, he was elected as president of its local number 3. In the role, he successfully introduced closed shops at the Enquirer, Sun, Gazette and Commercial, for which he gained the nickname of the "Original Boycotter". He also led the formation of the Cincinnati Trades Assembly, and served as its first president.

In 1880, Foster founded a labor movement newspaper, the Exponent. The following year, he chaired an ITU committee on amalgamated unions, in which role he promoted a conference of labor unions, to form a new federation. This was held in November 1881, and established the Federation of Organized Trades and Labor Unions (FOTLU), with Foster as its founding secretary. In 1883, he left the post, moved to Philadelphia once more, to work on the Evening Call. The following year, he was elected as president of the ITU local number 2, and became founding secretary of the city's Central Labor Union.

In 1885, Foster was re-elected as secretary of FOTLU. The following year, he joined the Knights of Labor, serving as its delegate to District Assembly 1. He died in 1886, while still in office.

Trade union offices
Preceded by Federation founded	Secretary of the Federation of Organized Trades and Labor Unions; 1881–1883	Succeeded by Frank Keyes Foster
Preceded by Gabriel Edmonston	Secretary of the Federation of Organized Trades and Labor Unions; 1885–1886	Succeeded by John S. Kirchner
