= Glass, Molders, Pottery, Plastics and Allied Workers International Union =

Trade union in the US and canada

Glass, Molders, Pottery, Plastics and Allied Workers International Union (GMPIU)
- Founded: May 1, 1988
- Dissolved: January 1, 2018
- Headquarters: Media, Pennsylvania
- Location(s): United States & Canada
- Members: 27,864 (2013)
- Affiliations: AFL–CIO and CLC
- Website: www.gmpiu.org

The Glass, Molders, Pottery, Plastics and Allied Workers International Union (GMPIU) was a labor union representing craft and industrial workers primarily in the ceramics, china, craft metals, fiberglass, glass, insulation, and pottery industries, in the United States and Canada.

== History ==
The union was established on May 1, 1988, when the Glass, Pottery, Plastics and Allied Workers' International Union merged with the International Molders and Allied Workers' Union. The Coopers' International Union of North America followed in 1992.

With the Coopers merger, the GMPIU had about 80,000 members in the United States and Canada in about 435 locals. As of 1993, the GMP had 35 staff working at its headquarters.

Job losses continued. As of 2009, the union had just 30,392 members. The Great Recession cut heavily into its membership, and by the end of 2012 it had just under 28,000 members. In 2016, the union agreed to merge into the United Steelworkers. The merger was completed on January 1, 2018, and the union became the GMP Council of the Steelworkers.

Membership (US records)
View chart definition.
Finances (US records; ×$1000)
View chart definition.

== Presidents ==
1988: James E. Hatfield
1994: Frank W. Carter
1997: James H. Rankin
2004: John P. Ryan
2010: Bruce Smith

== Bibliography ==
- Chaison, Gary N. Union Mergers in Hard Times: The View From Five Countries. Ithaca, N.Y.: ILR Press, 1996.
