= Denis A. Hayes =

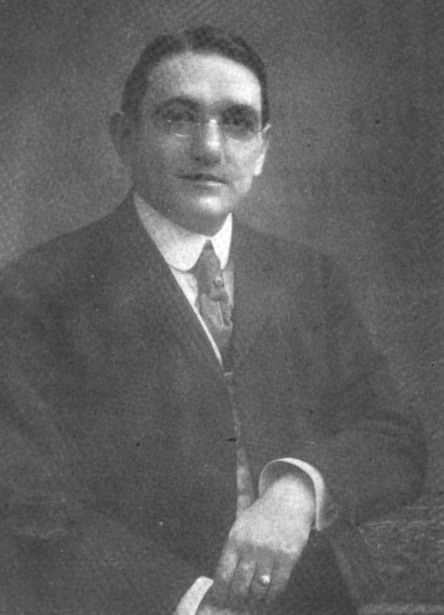
- Born: 1860; County Clare, Ireland
- Died: January 2, 1917 (aged 56–57); Philadelphia, Pennsylvania, US
- Occupation: Labor leader

Denis A. Hayes (1860 – January 2, 1917) was an American labor union leader.

== Biography ==
Born in County Clare in Ireland, Hayes emigrated to the United States with his family, when he was seven years old. The family settled in Zanesville, Ohio. Hayes worked on a farm before finding work in a glass bottle factory. He later moved to Newark, Ohio, where he joined the United Green Glass Workers' Association of the United States and Canada. In 1894, he was elected as vice-president of the union, and in 1896 as president of what became the "Glass Bottle Blowers Association of the United States and Canada".

Hayes moved to Philadelphia to take up the presidency of the union. In this role, he was prominent in the campaign against child labor. From 1901, he also served as a vice-president of the American Federation of Labor, and on the executive of the National Civic Federation. For the last 22 years of his life, he lived in the Hotel Windsor. He died there on January 2, 1917, and was buried in Zanesville.

Trade union offices
Preceded by Joseph D. Troth	President of the Glass Bottle Blowers' Association; 1896–1917	Succeeded by John A. Voll
Preceded by Thomas I. Kidd	Sixth Vice-President of the American Federation of Labor; 1900–1905	Succeeded by Daniel Keefe
Preceded by Thomas I. Kidd	Fifth Vice-President of the American Federation of Labor; 1905–1909	Succeeded by William Huber
Preceded by Max Morris	Fourth Vice-President of the American Federation of Labor; 1909–1913	Succeeded by Joseph F. Valentine
Preceded by James O'Connell	Third Vice-President of the American Federation of Labor; 1913–1917	Succeeded by Joseph F. Valentine
