= Max Morris (unionist) =

American trade unionist and politician (1866–1909)

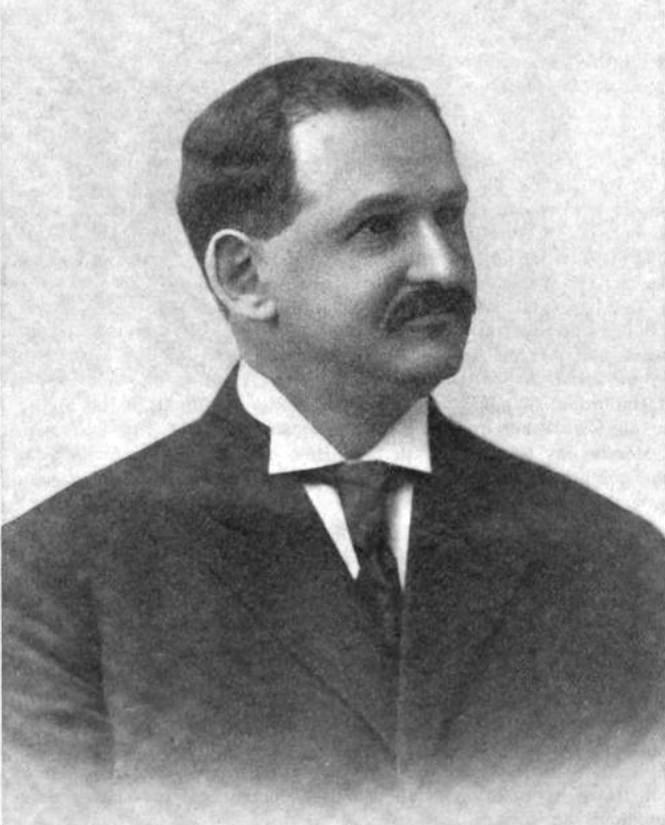

Member of the Colorado House of Representatives
- In office 1899–1904

3rd International President of the Retail Clerks International Union
- In office 1895–1909
- Preceded by: Ed Mallory
- Succeeded by: H. J. Conway

Personal details
- Born: June 9, 1866 Mobile, Alabama
- Died: June 6, 1909 (aged 42) Denver, Colorado
- Party: People's; Democratic
- Occupation: Trade unionist, politician

Max Morris (June 9, 1866 – June 6, 1909) was an American labor union leader and politician.

== Biography ==
Max Morris was born in Mobile, Alabama on June 9, 1866, and moved to Breckenridge, Colorado in 1880. In 1884, he became a retail clerk, and he organized a union of clerks based in Cripple Creek. In about 1890, he moved to Denver, where he founded the Denver Retail Clerks' Union, and he soon affiliated this to the new Retail Clerks' National Protective Association of America.

In 1896, Morris was elected as secretary-treasurer of the Retail Clerks, and from 1899, he also edited its journal, the Retail Clerks' National Advocate. That year, he was elected to the Colorado House of Representatives, representing the People's Party. He was elected again in 1901, this time representing the Democratic Party, serving until 1904.

Morris served as a vice-president of the American Federation of Labor from 1898. He died in Denver on June 6, 1909, still holding his trade union offices.

Trade union offices
Preceded by Ed Mallory	Secretary-Treasurer of the Retail Clerks' National Protective Association; 1896–1909	Succeeded by H. J. Conway
Preceded by New position	Fifth Vice-President of the American Federation of Labor; 1898–1900	Succeeded by Thomas I. Kidd
Preceded by John Mitchell	Fourth Vice-President of the American Federation of Labor; 1900–1909	Succeeded by Denis A. Hayes
