= Joseph F. Valentine =

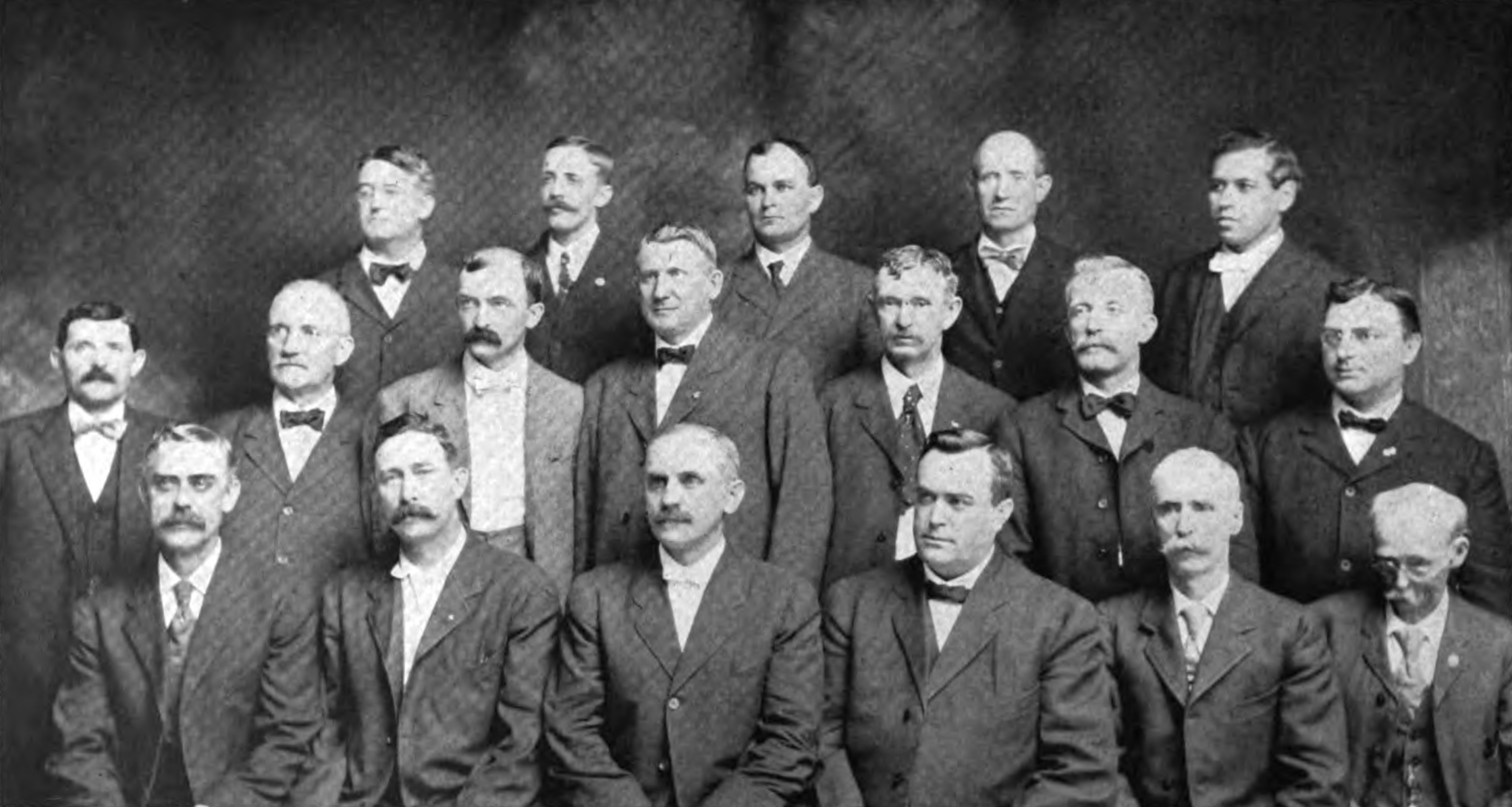
National Officers of the International Iron Molders' Union of North America, 1907. Top row (L-R): John R. O'Leary, W. T. Probert, Lawrence O'Keefe, John Manning, John P. Frey. Middle row: Victor Klieber, John Campbell, John I. Nolan, George Gunrey, John Bradley, William Skimerton, Joseph M. Dutton. Bottom row: Richard H. Metcalf, James Brown, Joseph F. Valentine, M. J. Keough, E. J. Denny, Alex Faulkner.

Joseph Franklin Ferdinand Valentine (1856 – February 7, 1930) was an American labor union leader.

Born in Baltimore, Valentine completed an apprenticeship as an iron molder, then moved to San Francisco. He joined the Iron Molders' Union of North America, and was president of its local 164 from 1880. In 1890, he was elected as vice-president of the international union, and moved to Cincinnati to take up the post.

In 1904, Valentine was arrested on a charge of aiding and abetting in the malicious destruction of property, after some unions were alleged to have blown up molds used at the Eureka Foundry. Valentine protested that he had no involvement with any such act, and the charges were later dropped.

In 1905, Valentine was elected as a vice-president of the American Federation of Labor, while in 1903, he won election as president of his union. He also served on the executive of the National Civic Federation from 1904, and as a vice-president of the Metal Trades Department. He retired in 1924, and in 1927 moved back to San Francisco.

Trade union offices
Preceded by Martin Fox	President of the Iron Molders' Union of North America; 1903–1924	Succeeded by Michael Keough
Preceded by William Huber	Sixth Vice-President of the American Federation of Labor; 1909–1913	Succeeded by Henry B. Perham
Preceded by Denis A. Hayes	Fourth Vice-President of the American Federation of Labor; 1913–1917	Succeeded by John R. Alpine
Preceded by Denis A. Hayes	Third Vice-President of the American Federation of Labor; 1917–1918	Succeeded by John R. Alpine
Preceded by James O'Connell	Second Vice-President of the American Federation of Labor; 1918–1924	Succeeded by Frank Duffy
