= William H. Sylvis =

American trade union leader (1828–1869)

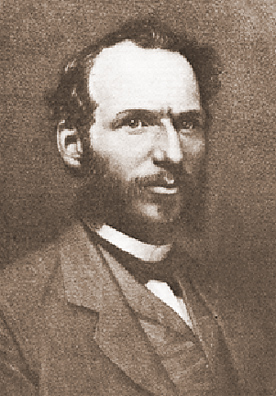
William Sylvis (1828-1869), American labor leader.

William H. Sylvis (1828–1869) was a pioneer American trade union leader who founded the Iron Molders' International Union. He also was a founder of the National Labor Union. It was one of the first American union federations attempting to unite workers of various crafts into a single national organization.

== Early years ==
William H. Sylvis was born in 1828 in the borough of Armagh, Pennsylvania, he did the second son of Nicholas and Maria Mott Sylvis, native-born Americans of Irish extraction who each traced their American ancestry back to the pre-revolutionary period. Nicholas' father was a maker of canal boats and repairman of wagons who found great difficulty earning enough money to support his family. During the Panic of 1837 the family's financial situation became particularly grave and young William was sent to live on the homestead of a prosperous neighbor named Pawling, earning his keep there by helping with chores around the farm.

The change of family setting proved beneficial for Sylvis from an educational standpoint, who was taught to read and write by his new employer. Sylvis attended school for the first time at age of 11. He proved to be a voracious reader and took full advantage of the library at the farm estate, owned as it was by a man who had been elected to the Pennsylvania State Assembly.

=== Iron molder ===
In 1846 the 18-year-old Sylvis left the farmstead to learn the trade of iron molding — fabricating products by pouring molten metal into wooden patterns.

In 1851 the 23-year-old Sylvis married 15-year-old Amelia A. Thomas. The union ultimately produced three sons, who were named after contemporary heroes — Henry Clay Sylvis, Oliver Perry Sylvis, and Lewis Clark Sylvis. Following his wife's death in 1865, Sylvis remarried; he ultimately fathered a total of five children.

Sylvis found his way to Philadelphia where he became active in the local trade union movement, serving as secretary of the Philadelphia molders' union. A spontaneous October 1857 strike over a proposed wage cut in the shop at which he was working was the precipitating event in Sylvis' entry into the labor movement. The shop's workers met and chose William Sylvis as their Secretary, from which sprung the organization which later became Iron-Moulders Union no. 1.

In this capacity Sylvis communicated with other local iron molders' unions with a view to establishing a national organization that could obtain higher wages for molders nationwide. Upon receiving positive feedback, Sylvis circulated a formal convention call to establish such a national organization, with the founding gathering held in Philadelphia on July 5, 1859.

A provisional federation of local molders unions followed, culminating in 1860 with the establishment of the National Union of Iron Molders.

During the American Civil War Sylvis aided the Union forces, despite having supported Stephen A. Douglas in the Presidential election of 1860. Early in the conflict Sylvis recruited a regiment on behalf of the Union Army, although he himself declined the offer of a commission as a 1st Lieutenant due to his wife's vehement objection. Several months later he established a militia company composed of Philadelphia iron molders, serving as a Sergeant with the group for several months.

In 1863 Sylvis was elected President of the flagging National Union of Iron Molders, a group which had virtually gone extinct during the wartime years. He subsequently traveled over 10,000 miles on behalf of the union, giving public speeches and organizing union locals. Sylvis persuaded the locals that he visited to bring their often disparate by-laws into conformity with a single national constitution, helping to unite the loose federation of local groups into a more centralized organization, which had changed its name to the Iron Molders' International Union at its 1863 conclave. During the course of his 1863 travels, Sylvis single-handedly formed 19 new molders' locals, reorganized 16 others which had fallen by the wayside after the outbreak of the war in 1861, and helped to solidify 12 more locals. In recognition of his service Sylvis was re-elected head of the union in 1864.

Under Sylvis the Molders' Union reworked its financial system, selling union cards and charters and collecting national dues — actions which managed to place the struggling union on a firm financial basis for the first time. Sylvis also created the union's first national strike fund, generated by a compulsory tax upon the membership.

=== Organizing the National Labor Union ===
In February 1866 Sylvis set his sights on the establishment of an organization that was broader still — a federation of unions which would be able to bring workers of different crafts together under a single organizational umbrella. Sylvis joined William Harding, president of the Coach Makers' International Union and Jonathan Fincher, head of the Machinists and Blacksmiths Union at a Philadelphia meeting to discuss the organization of such a national labor federation.

The trio resolved to hold another planning session in New York City, to which would be invited other prominent trade union leaders. This March 26, 1866 session was attended by a group of 11 delegates, who set in motion preparations for an August convention to be held in Baltimore, Maryland under the auspices of the Baltimore Trades Assembly. The end result of this preparatory period was the establishment of a new national federation, the National Labor Union (NLU).

The founding convention of the NLU opened on August 20, 1866. It was attended by 60 delegates, representing 43 local trade unions, 11 trade assemblies, 4 Eight-hour Leagues, and two national or international unions. Ironically, William Sylvis, arguably the founding father of the organization, was unable to attend the gathering due to illness. While Sylvis carefully followed the work of the five-day convention, he was critical of its work, declaring that it had built a "splendid track, placed upon it a locomotive complete in all its parts; provided an engineer and numerous assistants, placed them upon the footboard, told them to go ahead and then suddenly adjourned without providing wood or water to get up steam..."

During this interval Sylvis did not work as a trade union functionary, instead entering the world of journalism as co-editor of the Chicago broadsheet Workingman's Advocate, regarded as the most influential labor newspaper of the day. Thinking broadly about prospects for the labor movement as a vehicle to drive political policy, Sylvis came to see the NLU as a potential vehicle for social and economic reform, including the establishment of producer cooperatives, the 8-hour work day, and currency reform.

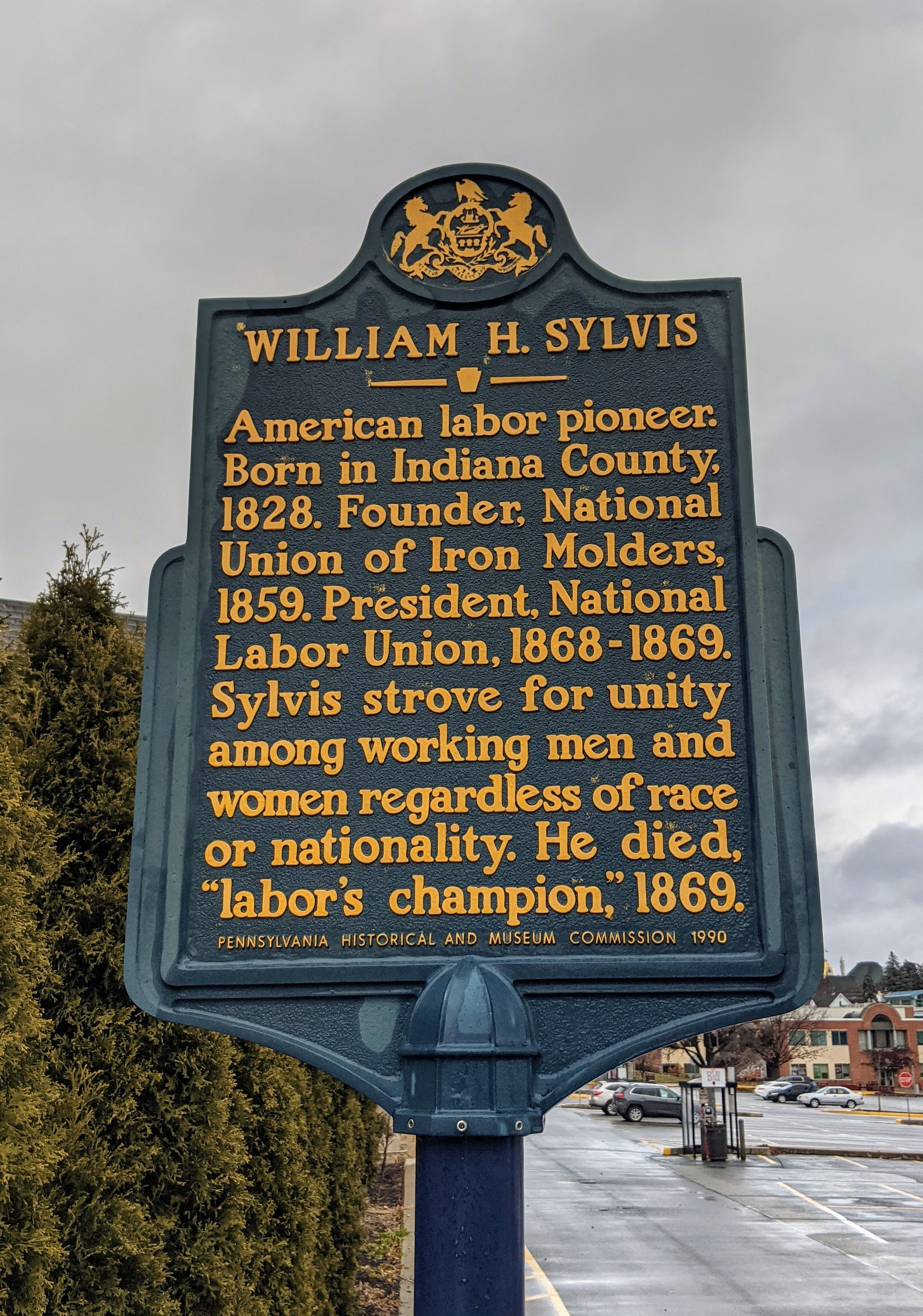
Historical marker dedicated to William H. Sylvis

Sylvis was elected president of the NLU at its third convention, held in New York City in August 1868. He also authored the organization's platform adopted at that gathering. By this juncture Sylvis had become an advocate of international organization of the working class through the vehicle of the International Workingmen's Association, the so-called "First International." He also declared that neither of the old political parties truly represented the interests of the working class and sought to transform the NLU into a workingmen's political party.

Death at an early age intervened, however, and Sylvis's vision of a broad and powerful National Labor Union and its associated National Reform Party ultimately came to naught.

=== Death and legacy ===
William Sylvis died in 1869. He was just 41 years old at the time of his death.

In 1990 the state of Pennsylvania honored Sylvis with the dedication of a historical marker at Indiana University of Pennsylvania in Indiana, Pennsylvania. The marker's text reads,

American labor pioneer. Born in Indiana County. 1828. Founder. National Union of Iron Molders, 1859. President, National Labor Union, 1868-1869. Sylvis strove for unity among working men and women regardless of race or nationality. He died, "labor's champion," 1869.

== See also ==
- International Workingmen's Association in America

== Works ==
- The Life, Speeches, Labors and Essays of William H. Sylvis: Late President of the Iron-Moulders' International Union; and also of the National Labor Union. James C. Sylvis, ed. Philadelphia: Claxton, Remsen and Haffelfinger, 1872.

Trade union offices
Preceded by Norman Van Alstyne	President of the Iron Molders' Union of North America; 1863–1869	Succeeded by F. J. Meyers
