= Frank Keyes Foster =

American labor leader (1854–1909)

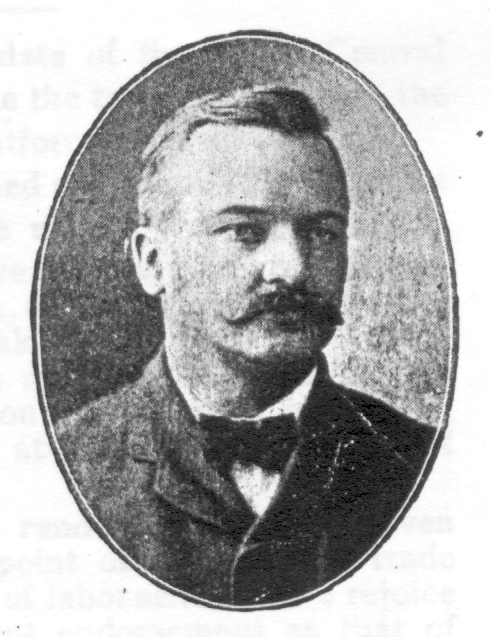
Frank Keys Foster

Frank Keyes Foster (December 19, 1854 – June 27, 1909) was an early American labor leader.

Foster was born in Palmer, Massachusetts on December 19, 1854, the son of Charles Dwight and Jane Elizabeth (Burgess) Foster; married Lucretia Ella Ladd on May 22, 1880 in Cambridge, Massachusetts. He grew up in Palmer and was educated in common schools and at Monson Academy. Between 1872 and 1876 he learned the printer's trade at the office of Churchman in Hartford, Connecticut. By 1878 he was working in Boston as a compositor and by 1882 as an editor. Foster took an active leadership role in the early formation of trade unions in the United States. He was a member and secretary of the Hartford Typographical Union; president of the Cambridge Typographical Union; a delegate to the Federation of Trades Convention; secretary of the Boston Central Trades and Labor Union; and secretary to the Knights of Labor. In 1883/84, he served as secretary of the Federation of Organized Trades and Labor Unions. Foster, along with Samuel Gompers, helped to found the American Federation of Labor (A. F of L.), was its first national secretary and president of the state chapter.

In his report to the federation's Chicago congress in 1884, Foster told the assembly, "A united demand for a shorter working day, backed by thorough organization, will prove vastly more effective than the enactment of a thousand laws depending for the enforcement upon the pleasure of aspiring politicians and sycophantic department officials," asking member unions to vote on "the feasibility of a universal strike for a working day of 8 (or 9) hours to take effect not later than May 1, 1886," ushering in the eight-hour labor-reform movement.

Foster helped to steer labor unions away from Socialist and Marxist philosophy and toward the Democratic Party. He was nominated for lieutenant governor of Massachusetts at the Democratic Party Convention in Worcester on September 30, 1886. Although he narrowly lost the election by some two thousand votes he led the ticket and had an impressive showing in Boston. He was founder and editor of the Haverhill (Mass.) Daily and Weekly Laborer, editor of the Labor Leader and editor and publisher of the monthly magazine The Liberator. He authored several books including a novel, The Evolution of a Trade Unionist (1901), and a book of poetry, The Karma of Labor, and other Verses (1903).

Foster also attained fame through a historic debate at Faneuil Hall in 1904 in which he engaged Charles W. Eliot, President of Harvard University, on the principles of trade unionism. He was a great lecturer and Labor Day orator who spoke in 23 states. He was also a member of the board of managers of the Franklin Fund, a trustee of the Boston Public Library, a member of the Committee of 100, Boston Chamber of Commerce, the New England Civic Federation, the Boston Economic Club and the Boston Chess Club.

Foster was taken ill in February 1907. The Federation provided financial assistance to his family during his illness until his death in June 1909. The funeral was held at his home at 61 Wrentham St., Ashmont, on 29 June 1909. The Rev. Arthur Little, Pastor of the Second Congregational Church at Dorchester, conducted the services. Interment was at Cedar Grove Cemetery. Honorary pallbearers included the Hon. John F. Fitzgerald, Mayor of Boston, Henry M. Whitney, E. A. Grozier, and Benjamin Joy.

Trade union offices
Preceded by William H. Foster	Secretary of the Federation of Organized Trades and Labor Unions; 1883–1884	Succeeded by Gabriel Edmonston
Preceded by John A. Moffit; James Wood	American Federation of Labor delegate to the Trades Union Congress; 1906; With: James Wilson	Succeeded by John T. Dempsey; William E. Klapetzky
