= Henry B. Perham =

Henry Burdon Perham (March 13, 1856 – 1949) was a British-born American labor unionist.

Born in England, Perham emigrated to Canada when he was 14 years old. He settled in Ontario, where he learned Morse code and telegraphy. In 1876, he moved to the United States, where he worked as a railroad telegrapher, but the following year he took part in a strike and was blacklisted. He instead worked as a prospector until 1889, when he returned to railroad telegraphy, working for the Denver and Rio Grande Railroad.

He joined the Order of Railroad Telegraphers of North America, and in 1891 became chair of its Denver and Rio Grande local. In 1897, he was elected as secretary-treasurer of the international union, relocating to Peoria, Illinois. That year, he employed a Canadian member of the union in its head office, and was charged with breaking the alien labor law. However, a federal grand jury ruled in his favor, setting a precedent for international organizations based in the United States.

In 1900, Perham came into conflict with the union's president, Walker V. Powell, who he believed was pursuing an unconstitutional fiscal policy. The majority of the membership sided with Perham; Powell was expelled, and in 1901, Perham was elected as president, moving to St Louis. Perham was elected as a vice-president of the American Federation of Labor in 1909, serving until 1918. In the role, he advocated industrial unionism.

By the late 1910s, much of the union's membership was dissatisfied with Perham's leadership, believing that he was doing little to improve their pay or working conditions. Perham was defeated for re-election in 1919, but remained a supporter of the union until his death in 1947.

Trade union offices
Preceded by Walker V. Powell	President of the Order of Railroad Telegraphers; 1901–1919	Succeeded by E. J. Manion
Preceded by Department founded	President of the Railway Employes' Department; 1908–1912	Succeeded by Arthur O. Wharton
Preceded by John R. Alpine	Eighth Vice-President of the American Federation of Labor; 1909–1913	Succeeded by Frank Duffy
Preceded by Joseph F. Valentine	Sixth Vice-President of the American Federation of Labor; 1913–1917	Succeeded by Frank Duffy
Preceded by John R. Alpine	Fifth Vice-President of the American Federation of Labor; 1917–1918	Succeeded by William Green
