= Thomas I. Kidd =

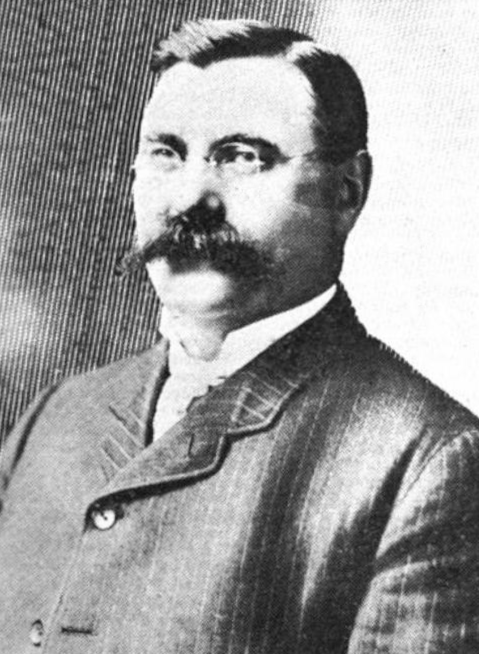
- Born: Thomas Inglis Kidd; December 12, 1860; Edinburgh, Scotland
- Died: November 7, 1941 (aged 80); Milwaukee, Wisconsin, United States
- Occupation: Labor leader
- Political party: Populist

Thomas Inglis Kidd (December 12, 1860 – November 7, 1941) was a Scottish-born American labor union leader. He was a widely known figure in Wisconsin's early labor history.

== Biography ==
Born in Edinburgh, Kidd began working as a laborer when he was ten years old, before becoming a woodworker. In 1885, he emigrated to the United States, settling in Nebraska, before moving to Denver. There, he founded a local union of woodworkers, which in 1890 joined the new Machine Wood Workers' International Union of America. Kidd was elected as secretary of the new union, and also became editor of its journal, the Machine Wood Worker. In 1892, he moved to Chicago, where he was a leading supporter of the Populist Party.

In 1896, Kidd took his union into a merger, which formed the Amalgamated Woodworkers' International Union of America. He became secretary of the new union, and also editor of its journal, The International Wood Worker. From 1899, he was a vice president of the American Federation of Labor (AFL). In 1904, he stood down from his union, to become a full-time organizer for the AFL. However, in 1907, he left the union movement entirely, to become a sales representative for the Brunswick-Balke-Collender Company, and was promoted to become a branch manager in 1913.

According to his obituary, He was one of three union representatives tried at Oshkosh, Wis., in 1898 on a charge of conspiracy to incite riot in connection with a lengthy lumber company strike." Clarence Darrow defended the trio and won acquittal for all three.

He died in Milwaukee on November 7, 1941.

Trade union offices
Preceded by New position	Sixth Vice-President of the American Federation of Labor; 1898–1900	Succeeded by Denis A. Hayes
Preceded by Max Morris	Fifth Vice-President of the American Federation of Labor; 1900–1905	Succeeded by Denis A. Hayes
