= Coopers' International Union of North America =

Labor union representing coopers in the United States and Canada

The Coopers' International Union of North America (CIUNA) was a labor union representing coopers in the United States and Canada.

The origins of the union lay in the Coopers of North America union, founded in 1870. It was a founding affiliate of the Federation of Organized Trades and Labor Unions in 1880, and in 1888 was chartered by the American Federation of Labor (AFL). Later in the year, it ceased to operate as a national union, and surrendered its charter. However, about ten of its local unions survived, and on November 10, 1890, they formed the CIUNA at a meeting in Titusville, Pennsylvania.

The new union was chartered by the AFL on October 3, 1891. It had a long-standing dispute with the United Brewery Workmen, which led to many coopers instead being represented by that union. Prohibition in the United States further reduced the membership of the union, and by 1925, it had only 1,215 members. By 1953, membership had recovered to 5,000.

The union was affiliated to the new AFL–CIO from 1955. By 1980, membership had fallen to a new low, of 1,056. On September 1, 1992, the union merged into the Glass, Molders, Pottery, Plastics and Allied Workers International Union.

== Presidents ==
1890: Michael McGowan
1891: D. Harnahan
1894: George Marthaler
1894: A. G. Newbergh
1895: Charles W. Teney
1896: J. L. McFadden
1897: George Boyle
1898: Charles W. Teney
1900: Joseph Hammer
1902: Patrick J. Donnelly
1903: Andrew C. Hughes
1905: Maurice O'Donnell
1909: Andrew C. Hughes
1922: Joseph Creese
1923: J. P. Maurer
1925: James J. Doyle
1965: Ernest D. Higdon
