= Martin Fox (labor leader) =

American union leader (1848-1907)

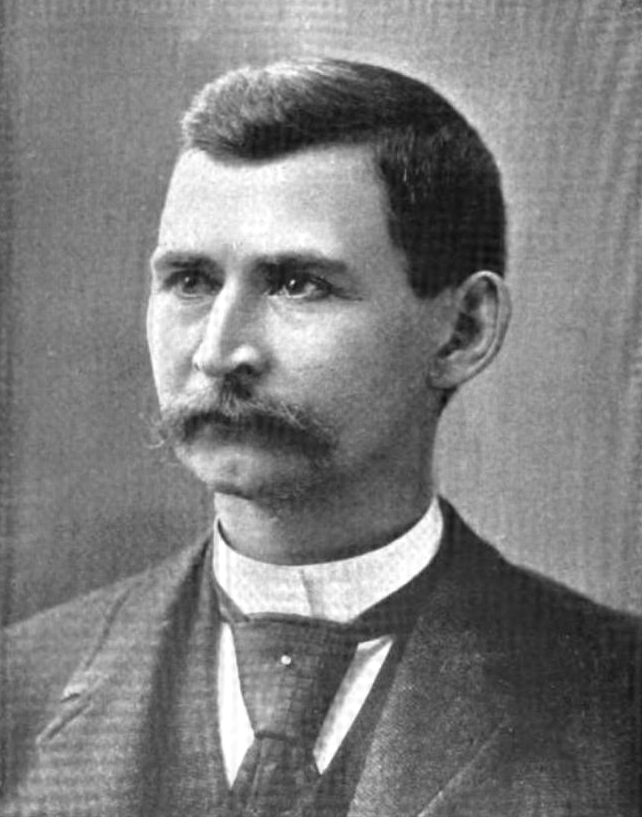
- Born: August 22, 1848; Cincinnati, Ohio
- Died: September 28, 1907 (aged 59); Cincinnati, Ohio
- Burial place: Calvary Cemetery, Cincinnati
- Occupation: Labor leader

Martin Fox (August 22, 1848 – September 28, 1907) was an American labor union leader.

== Biography ==
Born in Cincinnati, Fox followed his father in becoming an iron molder. He learned the trade at an early age, becoming a journeyman when only 16, and he joined the National Union of Iron Molders. He moved to Covington, Kentucky, and while there, in 1878, became a trustee of the union. From 1880 to 1886, he worked in the office of the president of the union, as a clerk, then in 1886 was elected as secretary of the union.

In 1890, Fox was elected as president the union, which had become known as the "Iron Molders Union of North America". He also served on the executive of the National Civic Federation. He stood down as president of the union in 1903, but continued working for it as a paid consultant, until his death at his home in Cincinnati on September 28, 1907.

He was buried in the Calvary Cemetery in Cincinnati, where his grave marker is by far the largest in the cemetery.

Trade union offices
Preceded by Patrick J. Fitzpatrick	President of the Iron Molders' Union of North America; 1890–1903	Succeeded by Joseph F. Valentine
Preceded by Jeremiah Sullivan; Adolph Strasser	American Federation of Labor delegate to the Trades Union Congress; 1897; With: George E. McNeill	Succeeded by James Duncan; Henry Demarest Lloyd
