= International Molders and Foundry Workers Union of North America =

Former trade union of the United States

International Molders and Foundry Workers' Union of North America
- Merged into: Glass, Molders, Pottery, Plastics & Allied Workers' International Union
- Founded: 1859
- Dissolved: 1988
- Location: United States of America
- Members: 10,000 (1866)
- Secessions: Canadian Association of Industrial Mechanical and Allied Workers
- Affiliations: AFL–CIO

International Molders and Foundry Workers Union of North America was an affiliated trade union of the AFL–CIO. The union traced its roots back to the formation of the Iron Molders' Union of North America, established in 1859 to represent craftsmen who cast wrought iron metal products. It is now part of the GMP International Union.

== Organizational history ==
=== Formation ===
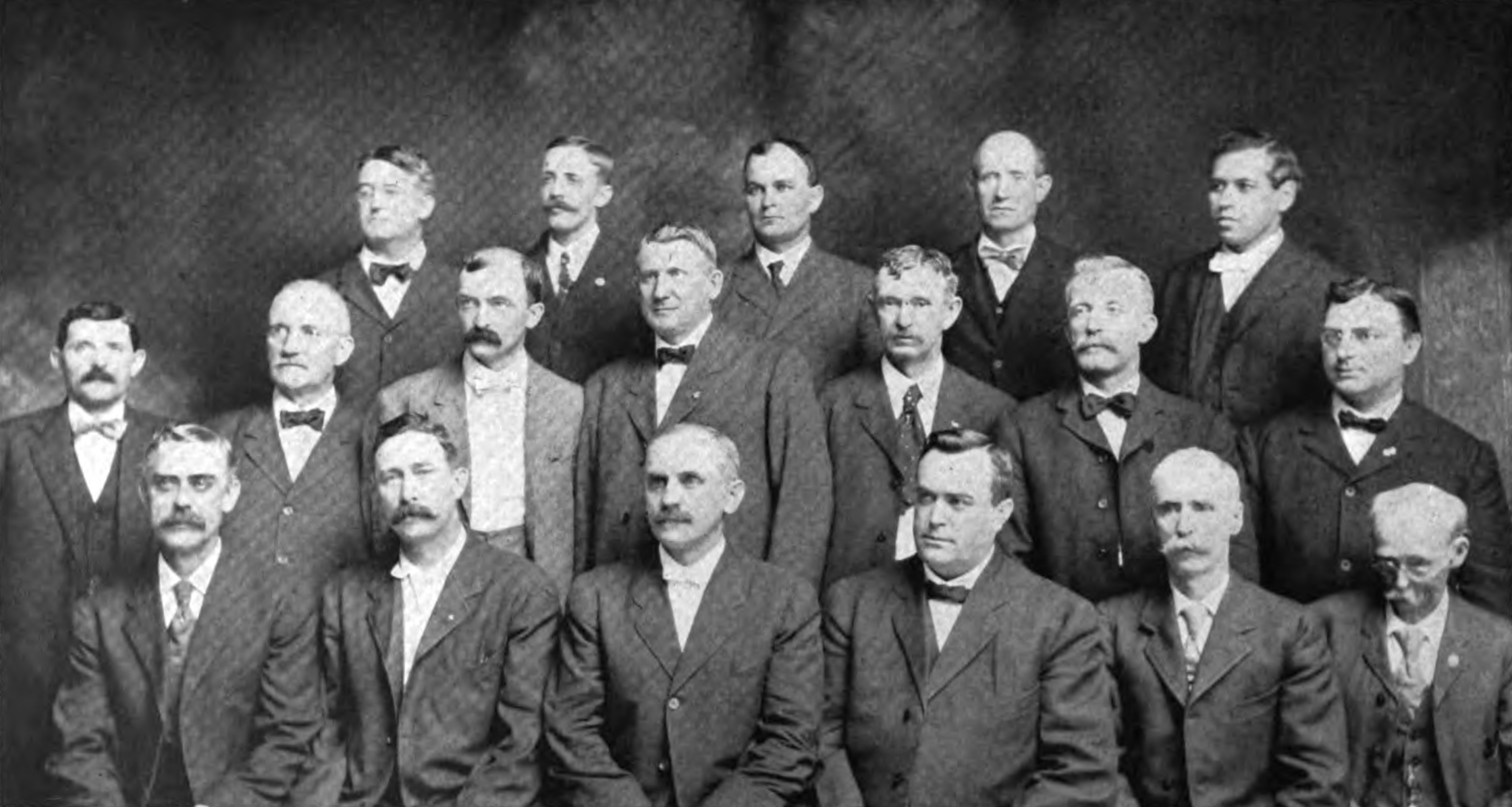
National Officers of the International Iron Molders' Union of North America, 1907. Top row (L-R): John R. O'Leary, W. T. Probert, Lawrence O'Keefe, John Manning, John P. Frey. Middle row: Victor Klieber, John Campbell, John I. Nolan, George Gunrey, John Bradley, William Skimerton, Joseph M. Dutton. Bottom row: Richard H. Metcalf, James Brown, Joseph F. Valentine, M. J. Keough, E. J. Denny, Alex Faulkner.

In the years prior to the American Civil War existing organization of workers in the iron industry was established on the basis of independent local groups. The first local union of iron molders was formed in Philadelphia in 1833. Similar unions were formed in Northeastern cities, although none of these unions lasted more than a few years. In the mid-19th century, there was renewed interest in creating unions for iron industry workers. In 1859, twelve local unions came together to form a national organization in the United States, and the Iron Molders' Union was established at a convention held in Philadelphia on July 5.

The first national convention was attended by 35 delegates, representing local iron molders organizations located throughout the Northeast and as far west as St. Louis. William C. Rea of Missouri was elected the first president of the organization and a committee of five headed by William H. Sylvis of Pennsylvania was appointed to prepare a declaration to the iron workers of America.

The Molders' Union initially took the form of a loose federation of already existing local organizations, each retaining almost complete autonomy.

Initial dues were set by the organization at $10 per local with an additional $10 per delegate sent to the national convention. This proved insufficient and in 1860 per capita dues were initiated at the rate of 5 cents per member per year. This still proved insufficient for the maintenance of a central office and dues were hiked in 1867 to 50 cents per quarter per member and again in 1872 to 25 cents per month.

The organization grew rapidly during the years of the Civil War, with non-union journeymen joining in great numbers. By 1866, the Iron Molders' Union touted 137 locals with a total membership of just under 10,000. By 1918, it the membership of the union was estimated to be around 50,000, although measurement was difficult.

In 1899, the union made an agreement with the National Founders' Association (which represented approximately 500 important employers in the industry) to arbitrate bargaining disputes.

Molding machines were gradually introduced over the course of the 1890s without much controversy. However, by 1900, nearly 10 percent of the workers employed by the National Founders' Association were machine operators, which created a push in the union to force the employers to hire molders to work the machines. This was controversial among rank-and-file molders who did not want to operate machines and who expected to earn the same pay as they did when they molded by hand.

Margaret Loomis Stecker wrote of the union in 1918 that it was "known to be one of the best managed, most effectively officered and adequately financed."

The union supported restrictions on immigration.

=== Mergers ===
A series of mergers led the union to change its name to the International Molders and Allied Workers Union.

In 1988, the Molders and Allied Workers merged with the Glass, Pottery, Plastics and Allied Workers International Union (GPPA) to create the Glass, Molders, Pottery, Plastics and Allied Workers International Union (GMP).

== Presidents ==
1859: William C. Rea
1860: Isaac J. Neall
1861: Norman Van Alstyne
1863: William H. Sylvis
1869: F. J. Meyers
1870: William Saffin
1879: Patrick J. Fitzpatrick
1890: Martin Fox
1903: Joseph F. Valentine
1924: Michael Keough
1932: Lawrence O'Keefe
1938: A. J. Prendergast
1939: Harry Stevenson
1948: Chester Sample
1960: William Lazzerini
1971: Draper Doyal
1976: Carl W. Studenroth
1984: Bernard Butsavage
