= American Flint Glass Workers' Union =

American Union which produced glass and other products in the US and Canada

The American Flint Glass Workers' Union (AFGWU) was a labor union representing workers involved in making glassware and related goods in the United States and Canada.

The union was founded in Pittsburgh on July 1, 1878, by locals which split away from the Knights of Labor. On July 27, 1887, it was chartered by the American Federation of Labor (AFL). In 1901, workers involved in making glass bottles split away to join the Glass Bottle Blowers' Association. The AFGWU left the AFL in 1903, but rejoined in 1912.

By 1925, the union had 6,900 members and was based in Toledo, Ohio. From 1955, it was affiliated to the new AFL–CIO, growing to 35,000 members by 1957, this figure falling slightly to 33,375 in 1980. By 2003, membership was down to 12,000, and on July 1, the union merged into the United Steelworkers.

== Presidents ==
1878: Robert A. Steen
1880: John N. Branen
1883: Thomas J. Irwin
1884: William J. Smith
1900: John Kunzler
1902: Charles E. Voitle
1903: Thomas W. Rowe
1916: William P. Clarke
1932: Joseph M. Gillooly
1940: Harry H. Cook
1952: Charles M. Scheff
1961: George M. Parker
1989: Larry Bankowski
2002: Tim Tuttle

== See also ==
- Corning Glass Works v. Brennan
- United States v. Throckmorton
