= International Brotherhood of Pottery and Allied Workers =

Labor union

The International Brotherhood of Pottery and Allied Workers (IBPAW) was a labor union representing workers in the pottery industry in the United States and Canada.

The union originated as a split from the Knights of Labor, based in East Liverpool, Ohio. It was founded as the National Brotherhood of Operative Potters on December 29, 1890. In 1900, it absorbed the Sanitary Pressers' National Union. On March 14, 1899, it was chartered by the American Federation of Labor, and in 1904, it absorbed the Potters' National Union of America.

In 1894, the labor union struck over wage reductions. From 1900 to 1922, there were no major strikes by the National Brotherhood of Operative Potters. The labor had succeeded in achieving collective bargaining agreements with the United States Potters' Association and the Sanitary Potters' Association, the two major employers' associations.

By 1925, the union had 7,900 members. In 1952, it was renamed as the International Brotherhood of Pottery Workers, and in 1955 it affiliated to the new AFL–CIO. It had 26,000 members in 1957, and in 1970, it adopted its final name. In 1976, it affiliated to the Seafarers' International Union, but it split away again in 1978.

The union's membership declined to 16,938 in 1980, and on August 5, 1982, it merged with the Glass Bottle Blowers' Association, to form the Glass, Pottery, Plastics and Allied Workers' International Union.

== Presidents ==
1890: Harry Layden
1892: Albert S. Hughes
1903: Thomas J. Duffy
1911: Edward Menge
1921: John Wood
1927: James M. Duffy
1953: Frank Hull
1956: Edwin L. Wheatley
1969: Lester H. Null
