= James Albert Bonsack =

American inventor (1859–1924)

James A. Bonsack
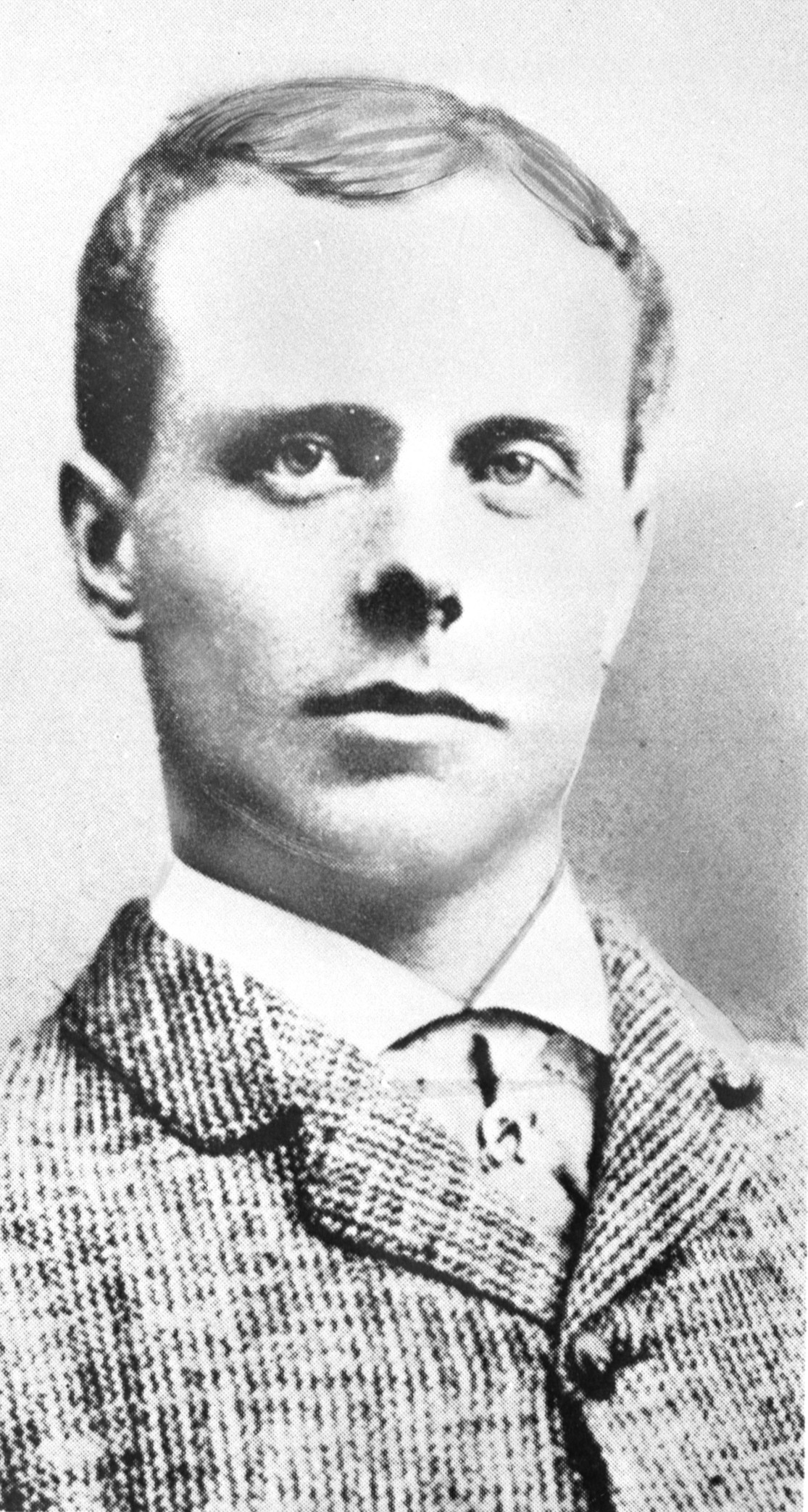
- Born: October 9, 1859
- Died: June 1, 1924 (aged 64)

James Albert Bonsack (October 9, 1859 – June 1, 1924) was an American inventor who developed an early cigarette rolling machine in 1880, and patented it the following year.

== Early life ==
James A. Bonsack was born in eastern Roanoke County, Virginia. His father, Jacob Bonsack, owned a woolen mill where James learned about industrial machinery. In 1878 he was admitted to the Lutheran Roanoke College, but decided to withdraw to work on designing a cigarette rolling machine. After building a successful prototype and patenting his invention, he registered the Bonsack Machine Company of Virginia on March 27, 1883. Following a court battle over alleged patent infringement by the inventor of a competing rolling machine, Bonsack paid $18,000 to buy out the competitor's patent claim.

== Bonsack's cigarette machine ==
Prior to that time, cigarettes had been rolled by hand. Readymade cigarettes were a luxury item, but were becoming increasingly popular. The slow manual fabrication process—a skilled cigarette roller could produce only about four cigarettes per minute on average—was insufficient to satisfy demand by the 1870s. In 1875, the Allen and Ginter company in Richmond, Virginia, offered a prize of $75,000 (equivalent to $2.2 million in 2025) for the invention of a machine able to roll cigarettes.

Bonsack took up the challenge and left college to devote his time to building such a machine. In 1880, he had a first working prototype, which was destroyed by a fire while in storage at Lynchburg, Virginia. Bonsack rebuilt it and filed a patent application on September 4, 1880. The patent was granted the following year (U.S. patents 238,640 from March 8, 1881 and 247,795 from October 4, 1881). Allen and Ginter had ordered a Bonsack machine but quickly rejected it, eager to save their prize money and fearing that consumers would balk at a machine-made product.

Bonsack's partnership with tobacco industrialist James Buchanan Duke made full commercial use of the invention, which could produce 120,000 cigarettes in 10 hours (200 per minute), and thereby revolutionized the cigarette industry. Duke set a deal with the Bonsack Machine Company in 1884. Duke agreed to produce all cigarettes with his two rented Bonsack machines and in return, Bonsack reduced Duke's royalties from $0.30 per thousand to $0.20 per thousand. Duke also hired one of Bonsack’s mechanics, resulting in fewer breakdowns of his machines than his competitors’. This secret contract resulted in a competitive advantage over Duke's competitors; he was able to lower his prices further than others could. Bonsack's machine was so efficient that by 1888, Duke had laid off all the company's cigarette rollers, who had been replaced by Bonsack's machine.

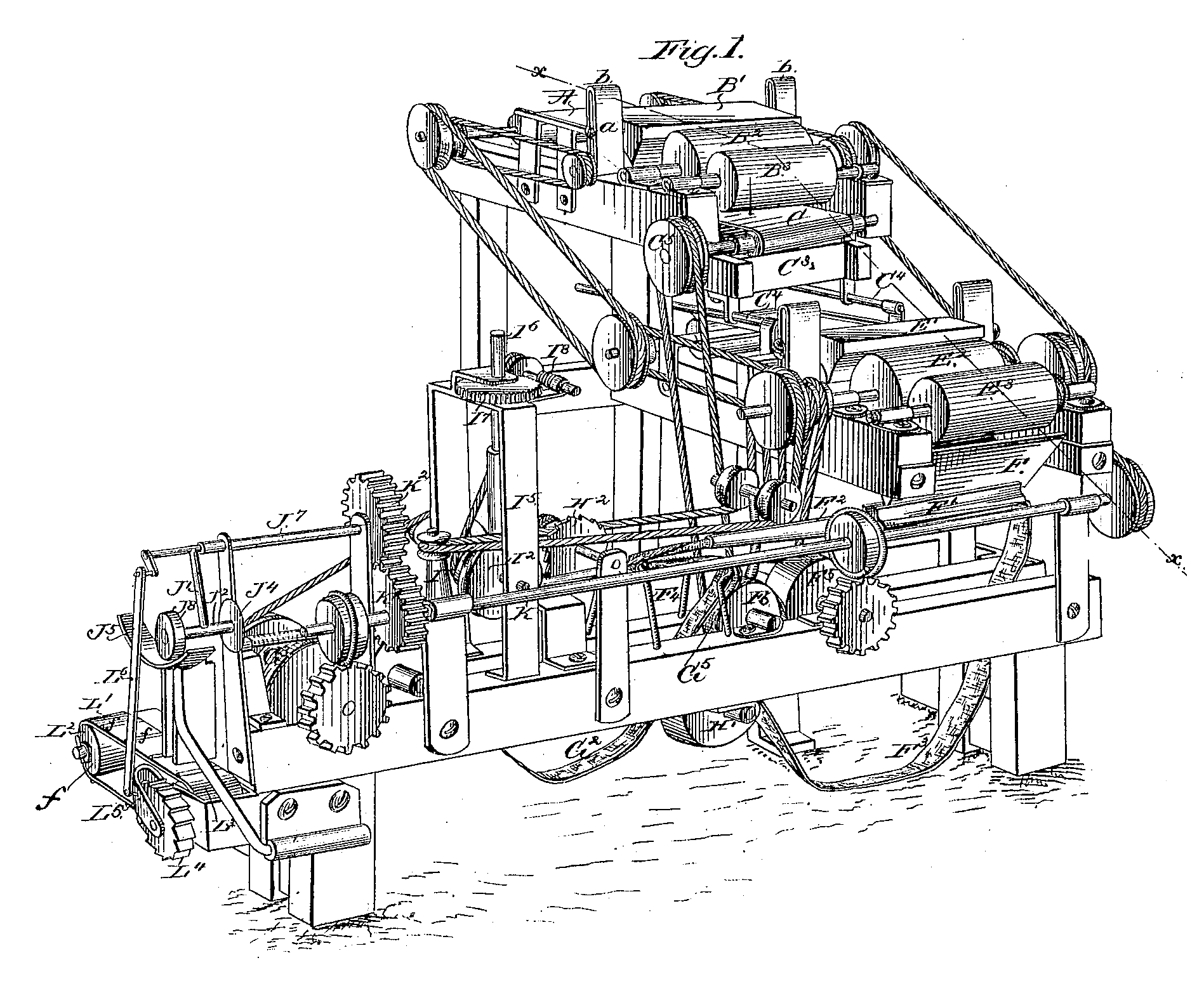
Bonsack's cigarette rolling machine, as shown on U.S. patent 238,640

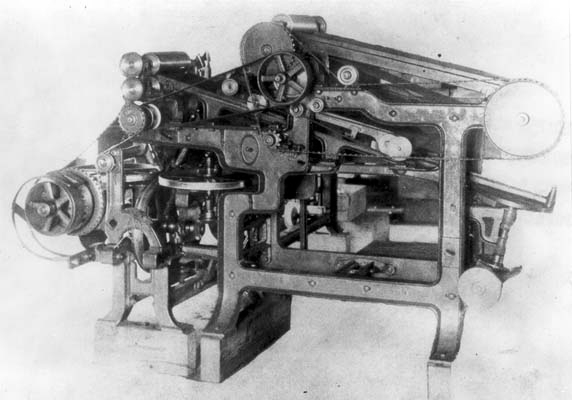
Bonsack Cigarette Machine, 1888

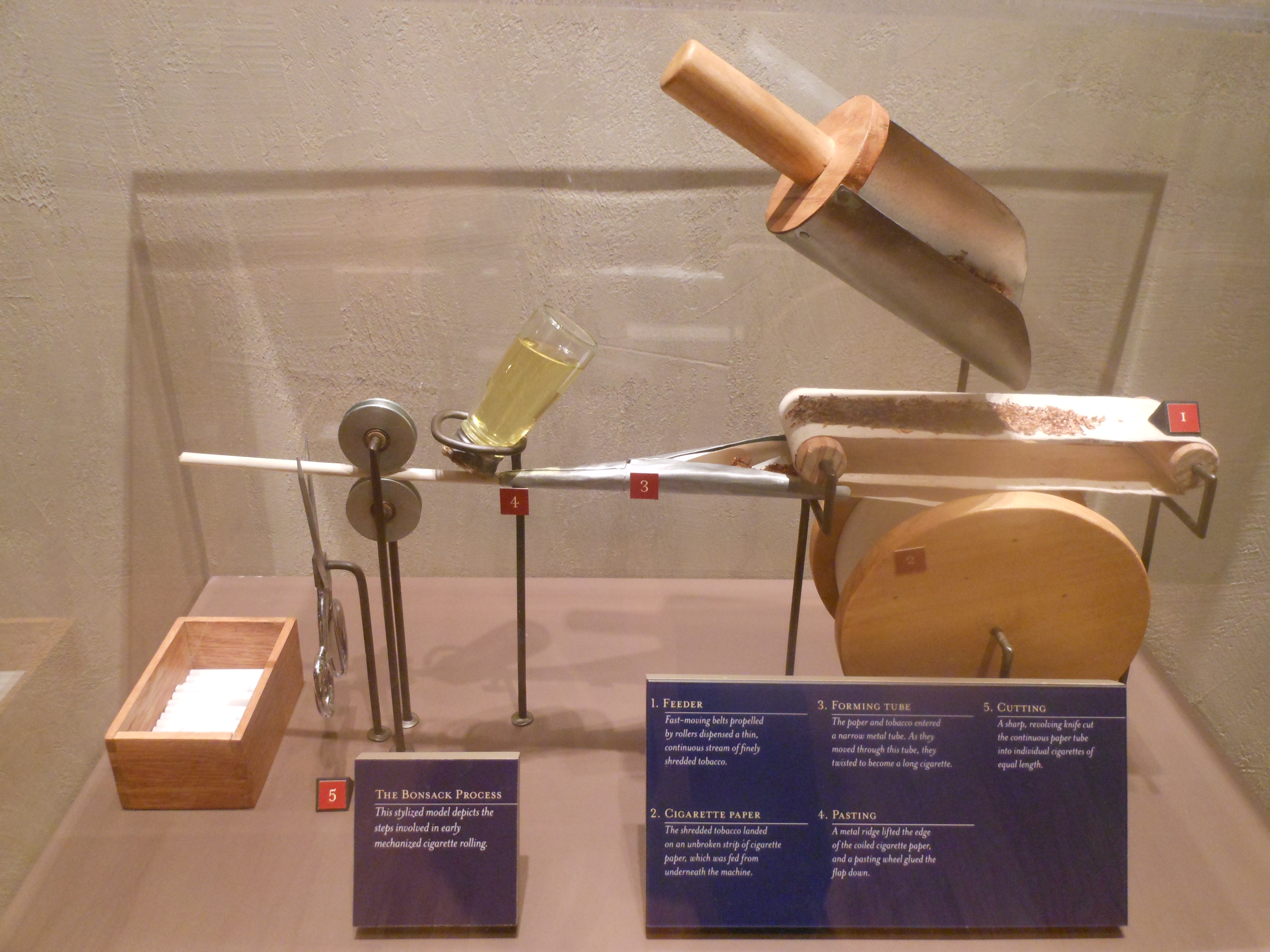
Bonsack machine model

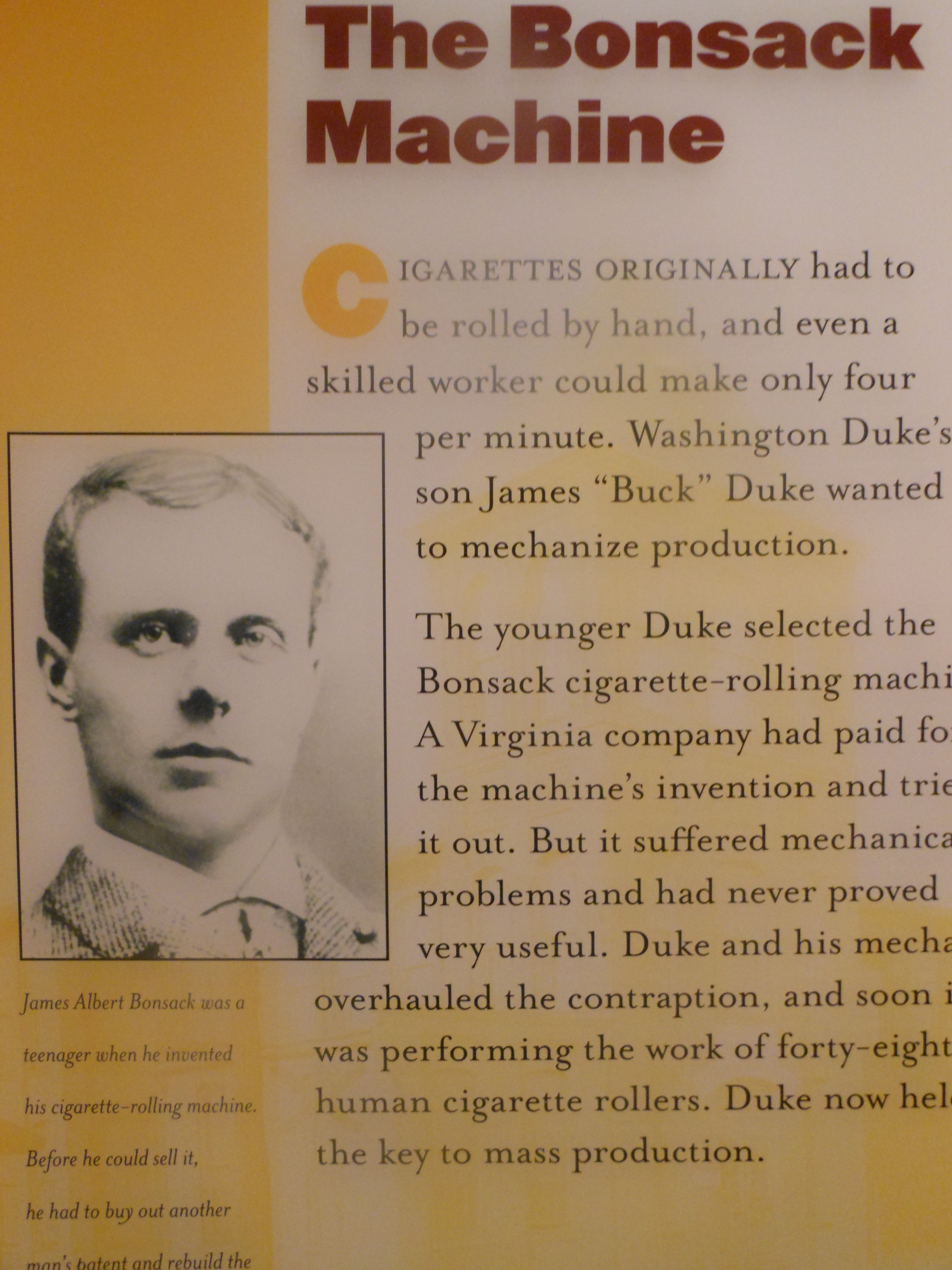
James A. Bonsack was 22 when he invented his machine

== Legacy ==
Bonsack, Virginia, an unincorporated community in eastern Roanoke County, is named after him.
