= Rosa Lee Guard =

- Born: 1882
- Died: March 9, 1937 (aged 54–55)
- Other name: R. Lee Guard
- Occupation: Labor unionist
- Employer: AFL-CIO
- Movement: American labor movement

Rosa Lee Guard (1882–1937) was a teacher, typist, and labor unionist who served as Samuel Gompers' secretary from April 1898 until his death in 1924.

== Early life and career ==
Rosa Lee Guard was born near Charlottesville, Virginia in 1882. She began her career as a schoolteacher around the age of 15 (1897).

From April 1898 to 1924, Guard served as Samuel Gompers' secretary in the AFL-CIO. Towards the end of Gompers' life, as he battled Bright's disease, she assisted with sending correspondence to other AFL members like Richard Ely and John Commons. She also had correspondence with Erving Winslow. Guard would often read to him and record dictated comments in Gompers' personal notebooks.

Guard was credited as Gompers' secretary and close friend in the National Park Service Historic Landmark Nomination for the Samuel Gompers House. Guard and Florence Calvert Thorne were also acknowledged in his autobiography.

After Gompers' death, William Green succeeded him as the President of the American Federation of Labor. Guard served as Green's secretary until her death in 1937.

== Legacy ==
- The Virginia Teaching Association has offered a Rosa Lee Guard Scholarship for Aspiring Educators.
