= Samuel Gompers House =

Historic house in Washington, D.C., United States

- U.S. National Register of Historic Places
- U.S. National Historic Landmark
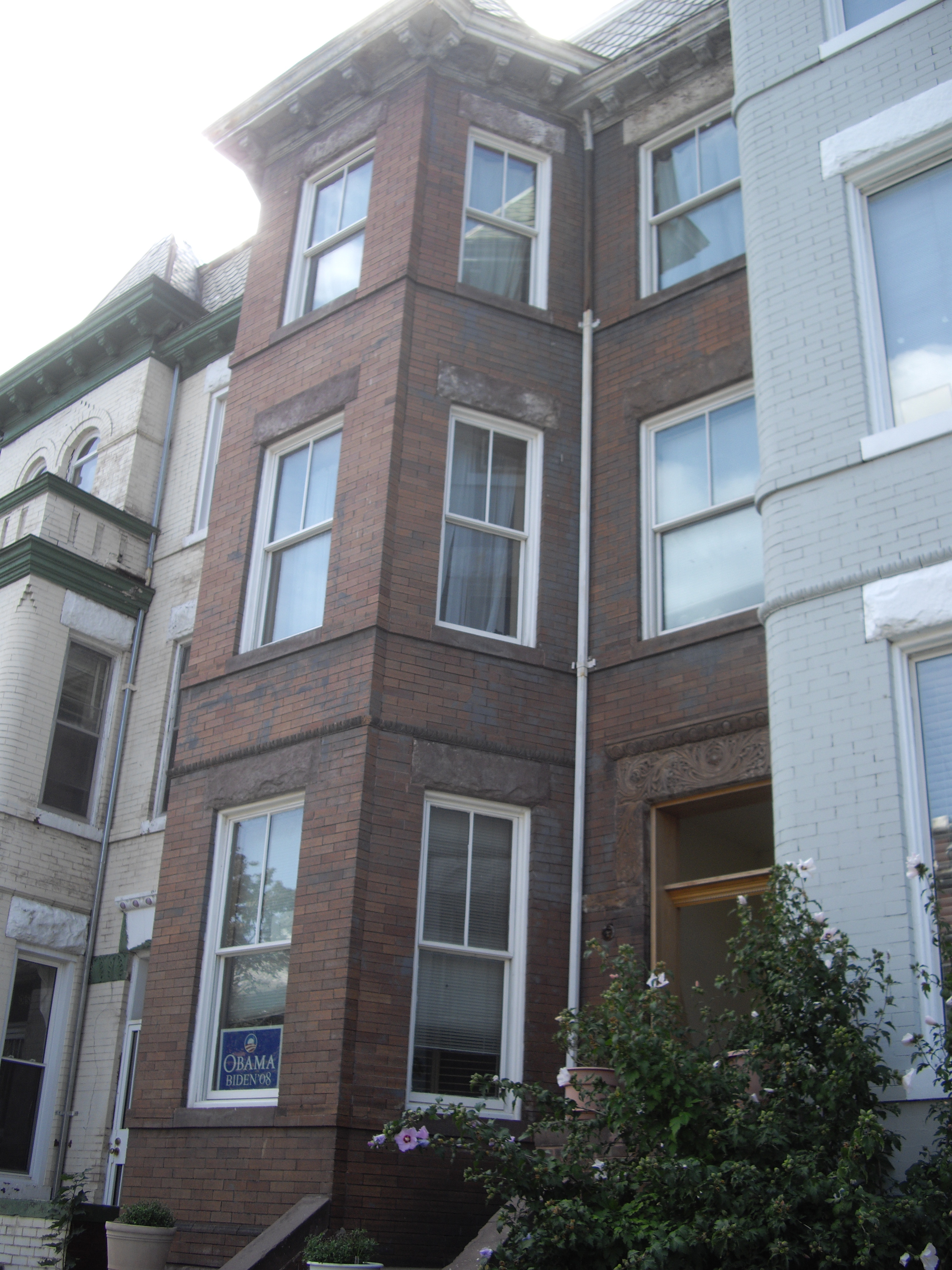

- Location within Washington, D.C. Location within the United States
- Location: 2122 1st St., NW, Washington, D.C.
- Coordinates: 38°55′8″N 77°0′44″W
- Built: 1902
- NRHP reference No.: 74002161

Significant dates
- Added to NRHP: September 23, 1974
- Designated NHL: May 30, 1974

The Samuel Gompers House is a historic house at 2122 1st Street NW, in the Bloomingdale neighborhood of Washington, D.C. Built around the turn of the 20th century, it was from 1902 until 1917 home to Samuel Gompers (1850–1924), who was founder and president of the American Federation of Labor from 1886 until his death. It was declared a National Historic Landmark in 1974.

== Description and history ==
The Samuel Gompers House is one of a series of row houses on the west side of 1st Street NW between V and W Streets in the Bloomingdale neighborhood in Northwest Washington. It is a narrow brick building, three stories in height and two bays wide. The left bay has a projecting hexagonal bay, which rises the full height to a polygonal roof capped by a finial. The entrance, in the right bay, is approached by stone steps with a low stone railing, and is topped by a carved stone lintel. The building is not otherwise of architectural interest. Its construction date is unknown; it is stylistically typical of row houses built in Washington during the late 19th and early 20th centuries.

The house was from 1902 until 1917 home to Samuel Gompers. Gompers, a native of England, came to the United States as a young man and worked as a cigar maker. He organized a union of cigar makers that became one of the most powerful of the early 1870s. He was involved with other union leaders in laying the foundations for the American Federation of Labor (AFL), whose first president he became in 1886. His house, in addition to being his home, was often the scene of meetings related to the organization, which was in the first quarter of the 20th century the nation's most influential labor organizations. Gompers vigorously pursued its three goals of higher wages, shorter hours, and better working conditions for American workers.

== See also ==
- List of National Historic Landmarks in Washington, D.C.
- National Register of Historic Places listings in the upper NW Quadrant of Washington, D.C.
- Samuel Gompers Memorial
