= Richard Powers (unionist) =

American labor union leader (c. 1844–1929)

Richard Powers (c.1844 – May 11, 1929) was an Irish-born American labor union leader.

Powers was born in Ireland, and emigrated to the United States in 1861, settling in New York City. He served in the Union Army during the American Civil War, then relocated to Chicago. He became a sailor, working on the Great Lakes, and in 1877, he was a founding member of a union for lumber unloaders. This inspired him, in 1878, to found the Lake Seamen's Union, becoming its first president.

In 1881, Powers was a founding member of the Federation of Organized Trades and Labor Unions (FOTLU), and was elected as its first president, serving a single term. He spent time in Washington DC, lobbying on behalf of seamen. After his presidential term, he remained on the executive of FOTLU until 1885. In 1886, he became the representative of District 136 of the Knights of Labor.

From the late 1880s, Powers worked in a variety of jobs, including drain inspector and revenue collector. He was also a member of Clan na Gael. He remained the leader of the Lake Seamen's Union into the 1890s, and died in 1929.

Trade union offices
Preceded by Federation founded	President of the Federation of Organized Trades and Labor Unions; 1881–1882	Succeeded by Samuel Gompers
Preceded by Samuel Gompers	First Vice-President of the Federation of Organized Trades and Labor Unions; 1882–1883	Succeeded by Samuel Gompers
Preceded by New position	Fourth Vice-President of the Federation of Organized Trades and Labor Unions; 1883–1884	Succeeded by Frederick Blend
Preceded by Gabriel Edmonston	Second Vice-President of the Federation of Organized Trades and Labor Unions; 1884–1885	Succeeded by William E. Tomson
