= Karl Laurrell =

Karl Malcolm Ferdinand Laurrell (1844-1922) was a Swedish labor organizer and Marxist who was exiled from Sweden and eventually emigrated to the United States. He was the secretary of the Scandinavian branch of the International Workingmen's Association and was also involved in union activities in New York City. He was an influential figure for Samuel Gompers, whom he took under his wing and mentored. He urged Gompers to put his faith in the organized economic movement of trade unionism rather than the socialist political movement. While he encouraged Gompers to attend socialist meetings he discouraged him from joining. Laurrell represented cigar makers.
