= Patrick H. McLogan =

American labor unionist

Patrick Henry McLogan (1831 – December 16, 1894) was an American labor unionist.

Born in Detroit, McLogan became a printer. He was active in local politics, and served for a period as clerk of the police court. In 1857, he joined the International Typographical Union (ITU). In 1865, he moved to Chicago, to work for the Chicago Republican newspaper, and later worked on most of the local papers. In 1874 and 1875, McLogan served as president of the Chicago Typographical Union, then in 1876, he was a delegate to the ITU convention.

In 1880, the Chicago Trade and Labor Council was re-founded, following a recent split, and McLogan was appointed as its vice president. The following year, McLogan and Ed Irwin founded the Progressive Age, a labor movement newspaper. In its columns, McLogan argued for workers to co-ordinate their votes between the major party candidates, in order to show their strength. He resigned from the paper in September 1881. In 1882, he testified before the US Senate Committee on Education, advocating for an employers' liability act, and for the school leaving age to be raised to 18.

In 1883, McLogan was elected as president of the Federation of Organized Trades and Labor Unions, serving a single term. The same year, he worked with the Knights of Labor to found the Central Labor Club, initially to endorse sympathetic candidates for Chicago City Council, but soon refocused on state and national politics.

McLogan later chaired the labor convention which nominated Robert S. Nelson of the Socialist Labor Party of America in the 1887 Chicago mayoral election. He died suddenly in 1894, and was buried in the union's lot in the Calvary Cemetery. His son, Harry R. McLogan, became a prominent attorney and political activist in Milwaukee.

Trade union offices
Preceded by Samuel Gompers	President of the Federation of Organized Trades and Labor Unions; 1883–1884	Succeeded by W. M. McClelland
