= Pan-American Federation of Labor =

Pan-American Federation of Labor (Spanish: Confederación Obrera Panamericana) was an international trade union organization, promoted by the American Federation of Labor. The organization was founded at a conference in Laredo, Texas, United States in December 1918. At the conference, 72 delegates took part, 46 from USA, 21 from Mexico (representing CROM) and five from Guatemala, Costa Rica, El Salvador and Colombia. The conference elected Samuel Gompers as the president of the organization.

The organization was later joined by reformist labor movements from Cuba, Honduras, Puerto Rico, Nicaragua and Bolivia. AFL and CROM were, however, the only national trade union federations that joined the organization.

The PAFL was seen by many labor leaders as an attempt by the AFL to extend its influence over the Latin American labor movement and isolate it from European and especially communist influences.

Among the PAFLs successes, however, was an understanding reached between the US and Mexican unions on the position of Latin American workers in the United States, condemnation of Latin America's repressive regimes and some of the policies of the US in Nicaragua and other countries.

The organization was virtually disintegrated in 1930, ahead of the 6th conference to be held in Havana, Cuba. The Cuban conference organizers cancelled the event, as the AFL had supported a call for US military intervention in Cuba. The organization was formally dissolved in 1934.
