= Samuel Gompers Memorial =

Memorial in Washington, D.C., U.S.

- U.S. Historic district – Contributing property
- D.C. Inventory of Historic Sites
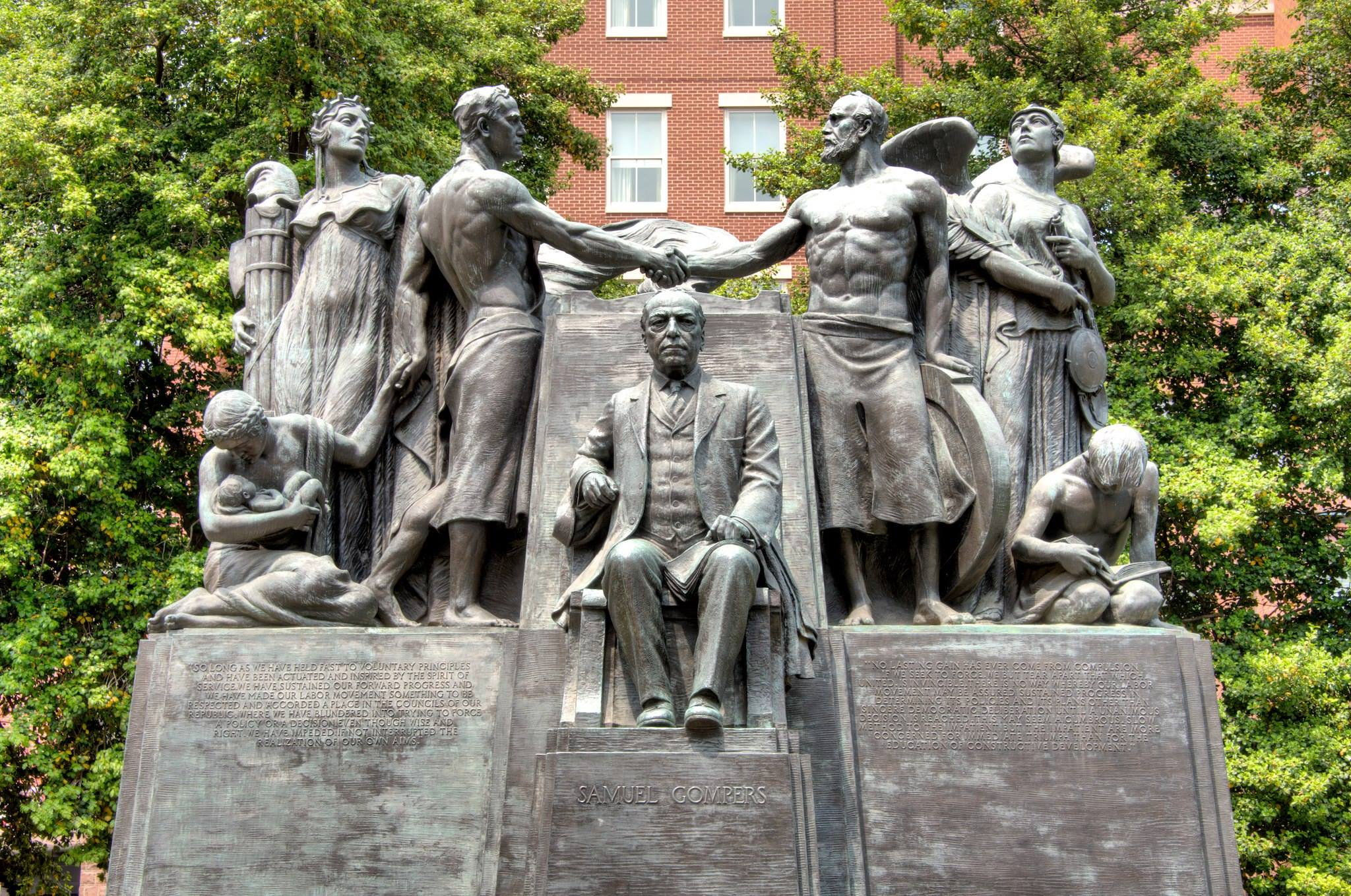
- Samuel Gompers Memorial in 2015
- Location: 10th Street, L Street, Massachusetts Avenue NW, Washington, D.C., U.S.
- Coordinates: 38°54′14.22″N 77°1′35.4″W
- Built: 1933
- Architect: Robert Ingersoll Aitken (sculptor); Fred Drew Company (architect); Vitale and Geiffert (landscape); Roman Bronze Works (founder
- Part of: Mount Vernon West Historic District
- NRHP reference No.: 07001054; 07001054(Mount Vernon West Historic District)

Significant dates
- Added to NRHP: October 11, 2007; September 9, 1999 (Mount Vernon West Historic District)
- Designated DCIHS: February 22, 2007; July 22, 1999 (Mount Vernon West Historic District)

The Samuel Gompers Memorial is a bronze collection of statues in Washington, D.C., sited on a triangular park at the intersection of 11th Street, Massachusetts Avenue, and N Street NW. Samuel Gompers was an English-born American who grew up working in cigar factories, where he witnessed the long hours and dangerous conditions people experienced in factory jobs. He helped with growing the Cigar Makers' International Union, and a few years later, founded the American Federation of Labor (AFL). The number of members rose from 50,000 to 3,000,000 during his time as president of the union. He was not only successful in expanding the power of the labor movement, but also increased its prestige.

A year after Gomper's death, it was suggested a memorial be placed in Washington, D.C., that would honor the labor hero. While fundraising for the project took place amongst AFL members, Robert Ingersoll Aitken was selected to create the sculptures. In 1933, the unveiling and dedication of the memorial, located just one block from the American Federation of Labor Building, took place. Amongst the dignitaries present at the ceremony were a number of labor leaders, Eleanor Roosevelt, and President Franklin D. Roosevelt, who spoke at the event.

The memorial has been repaired on occasion since its installation. The lot where the statue stands was renamed Samuel Gompers Memorial Park in 1955. The memorial depicts Gompers seated and six figures behind him, each representing a facet of labor history. The memorial was listed on the National Register of Historic Places and District of Columbia Inventory of Historic Sites in 2007, eight years after it was designated a contributing property to the Mount Vernon West Historic District.

== History ==
=== Biography ===
Samuel Gompers (1850–1924) was born in the United Kingdom of Great Britain and Ireland, but moved with his family to New York when he was five. At a young age, he worked rolling cigars, witnessing the hardships faced by working-class people. This was the catalyst of his involvement with the labor movement in the 1870s. He assisted with growth of the Cigar Makers' International Union, a few years before founding the American Federation of Labor in 1886, serving as president until his death. During World War I, he served on President Woodrow Wilson's Council of National Defense. Not only did he find a major union, but he was well known for enhancing the prestige of the labor movement in general, and for increasing the number of AFL workers from 50,000 to 3,000,000.

=== Memorial plans ===
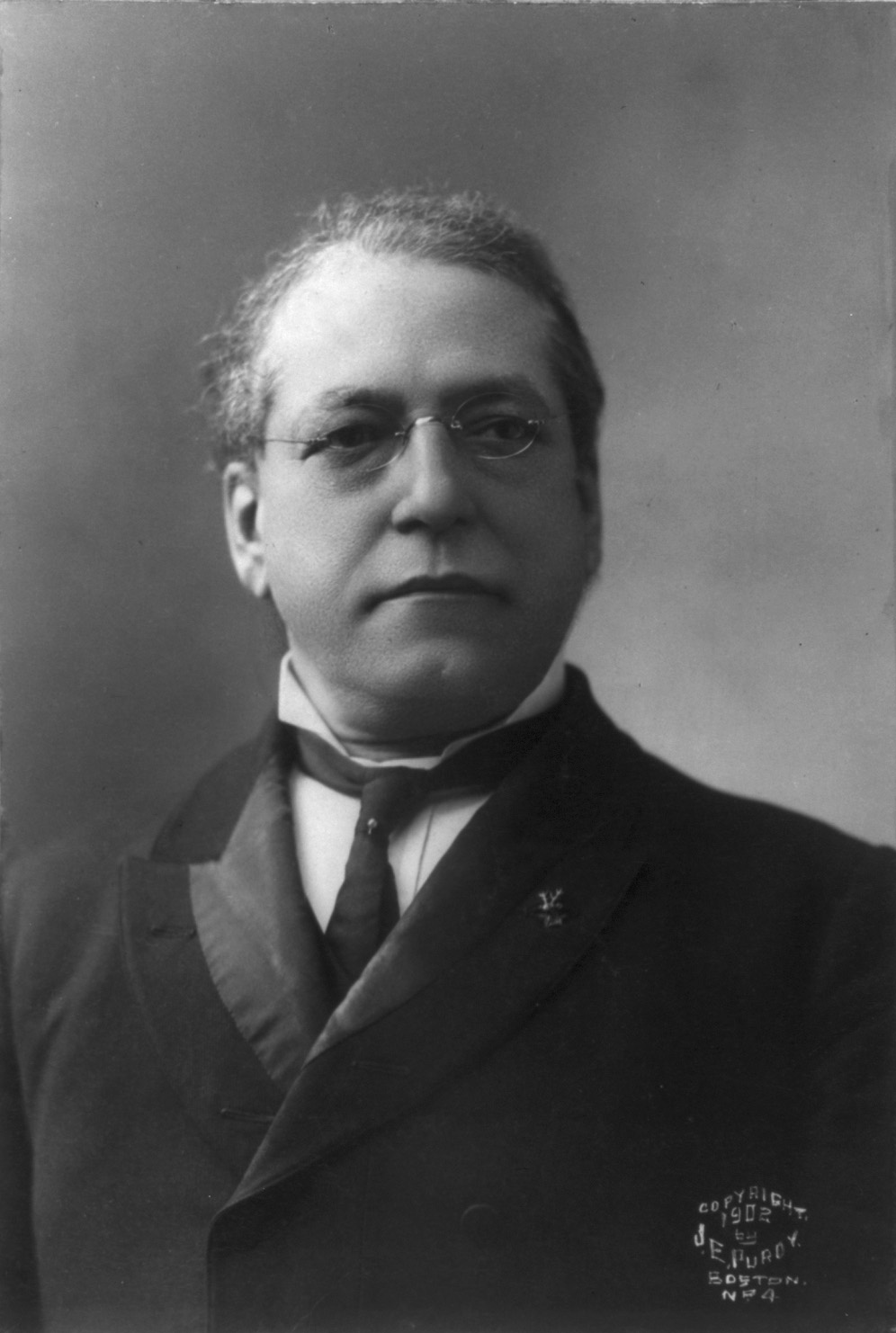
Samuel Gompers in 1902

In May 1925, the AFL agreed to construct a memorial in Washington, D.C., in honor of Gompers. A committee formed for the project included AFL president William Green, Matthew Woll, and Frank Duffy. Green said the decision to erect a memorial was unanimous amongst AFL leaders. The installation of the memorial was approved by Congress on March 5, 1928. The following year Frank Morrison and the sculptor chosen to create the statues, Robert Ingersoll Aitken, met with representatives from the United States Commission of Fine Arts (CFA) to seek their approval for the memorial's design. By that time a location for the memorial had been chosen, one block west of the American Federation of Labor Building.

The design shown to the CFA was originally an 8-feet (2.4 m) tall statue along with three 7-foot (2.1 m) statues of men dressed in overalls. These three statues would each hold a torch that would illuminate at night. There was to be a marble wall with seating and decorated with reliefs of pivotal moments in labor history. It took over a year for the final design to be approved by the CFA.

In July 1933, site work began for the memorial. In addition to the sculptures by Aitken, the Fred Drew Company architectural firm designed the monument, Vitale and Geiffert were the landscape architects, and Roman Bronze Works was the founder. The $117,408 needed for the construction and installation of the memorial was paid for by members of the AFL.

=== Dedication ===
The memorial was dedicated on October 7, 1933, and temporary stands were built to accommodate 2,500 spectators. Another 5,000 onlookers attended the ceremony. Gompers' great-grandson pulled the patriotic-colored veil off the memorial. Among those in were additional relatives of Gompers and actress Marie Dressler. President Franklin D. Roosevelt, and his wife Eleanor, were also in attendance. Roosevelt gave a lengthy speech on Gompers' history and the benefits of the AFL and other unions. Roosevelt noted the present version of the AFL and its affiliates "are in a broad sense giving the same kind of fine cooperation to your Government which Samuel Gompers and his associates gave to that same Government in the old days."

=== Later history ===
In 1955, the area surrounding the memorial was officially renamed Samuel Gompers Memorial Park. Due to erosion, cracks throughout the memorial, and patina forming on the bronze, it required repairs in the 1980s. The estimated cost of the repairs was $50,000. The AFL-CIO' Metropolitan Washington Council began a fundraising campaign to restore the memorial. The national ALF-CIO made a $5,000 donation at the beginning of the fundraising. Due to financial problems, the restoration was tabled in 1983. After a report by an engineering firm that warned the memorial needed immediate repairs, the fundraising drive began in 1985, with a finished date the following year.

The Samuel Gompers Memorial was added to the District of Columbia Inventory of Historic Sites (DCIHS) on February 22, 2007, and the National Register of Historic Places (NRHP) on October 11, 2007. The memorial is a contributing property to the Mount Vernon West Historic District, more commonly known as the Shaw Historic District, which was added to the DCIHS on July 22, 1999, and the NRHP on September 9, 1999. The park is a contributing property to the L'Enfant Plan, listed on the DCIHS on November 8, 1964, and the NRHP on April 24, 1997. The memorial is the only outdoor sculpture in Washington, D.C., honoring a labor leader.

== Location and design ==
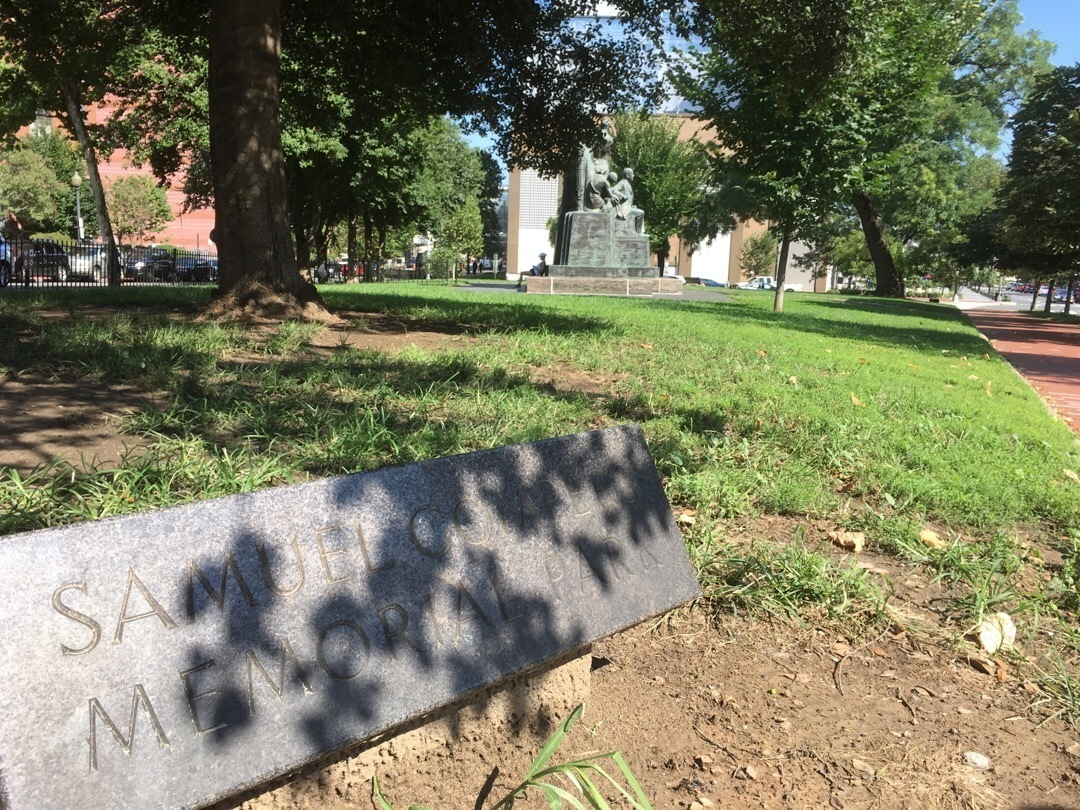
Samuel Gompers Memorial Park

The memorial is located on Reservation 69, two trapezoidal lots between 10th Street, L Street, and Massachusetts Avenue, in the Shaw neighborhood of Washington, D.C. The lot is called Samuel Gompers Memorial Park and was originally landscaped in the 1880s. The memorial faces south towards Massachusetts Avenue NW. A small park with a statue of Edmund Burke is located across the street. There are trees and shrubbery planted in the park.

The bronze statue of Gompers is 8-feet (2.4 m) tall, and is resting on a seat at the front of the memorial. The total height of the memorial, including the other statues, is 21.4-feet (6.5 m), and the width is 12.2-feet (3.7 m). The Minnesota granite base is 18-inches (46 cm) high, 27-feet (8.2 m) long, and 16.3-feet (5 m) wide.

The memorial depicts Gompers sitting in a chair while holding a stack of papers. Behind him are six allegorical statues that represent the labor history of the U.S. The first statue, depicting a man sitting on the floor, represents the rise of the labor movement, while the seated statue on the other side is of a woman who represents home protection. There are two winged women behind the other statues, one holding a fasces, that both represent justice. Standing the closest to Gompers are two shirtless male statues who are grasping each other's hands. These two represent unity and cooperation. A 1930 steam locomotive engine is also present on the memorial, as are other symbols of union work.

=== Inscriptions ===
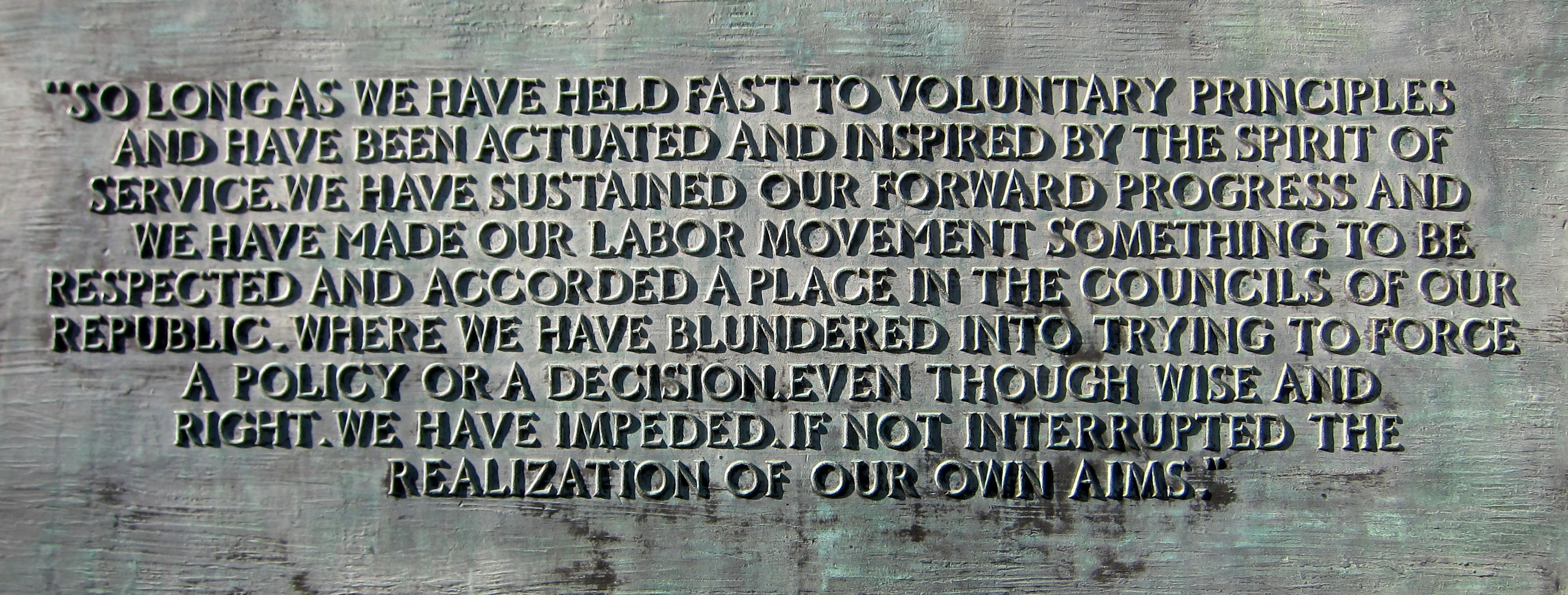
One of the inscriptions on the memorial

The inscription on the southeast side reads, "So long as we have held fast to voluntary principles and have been actuated and inspired by the spirit of service, we have sustained our forward progress and we have made our labor movement something to be respected and accorded a place in the councils of our republic. Where we have blundered into trying to force a policy or a decision even though wise and right, we have impeded if not interrupted the realization of our own aims."

On the southwest side it reads, "No lasting gain has ever come from compulsion. If we seek to force, we but tear apart that which united is invincible. There is no way whereby our labor movement may be assured and sustained progress in determining its policies and its plans other than sincere democratic deliberation until a unanimous decision is reached. This may seem a cumbrous, slow method to the impatient, but the impatient are more concerned for immediate triumph than for the education of constructive development."

On the back side, it reads, "Say to the organized workers of America that as I have kept the faith I expect that they will keep the faith. They must carry on. Say to them that a union man carrying a card is not a good citizen unless he upholds the institutions of our country and a poor citizen of our country if he upholds the institutions of our country and forgets the obligations of his trade association."

== See also ==
- List of public art in Washington, D.C., Ward 2
- National Register of Historic Places listings in central Washington, D.C.
- Samuel Gompers House

== Notes ==
1. The National Register of Historic Places nomination form is accessible at the bottom of the reference page.
