= Samuel Gompers =

British-American labor union leader (1850–1924)

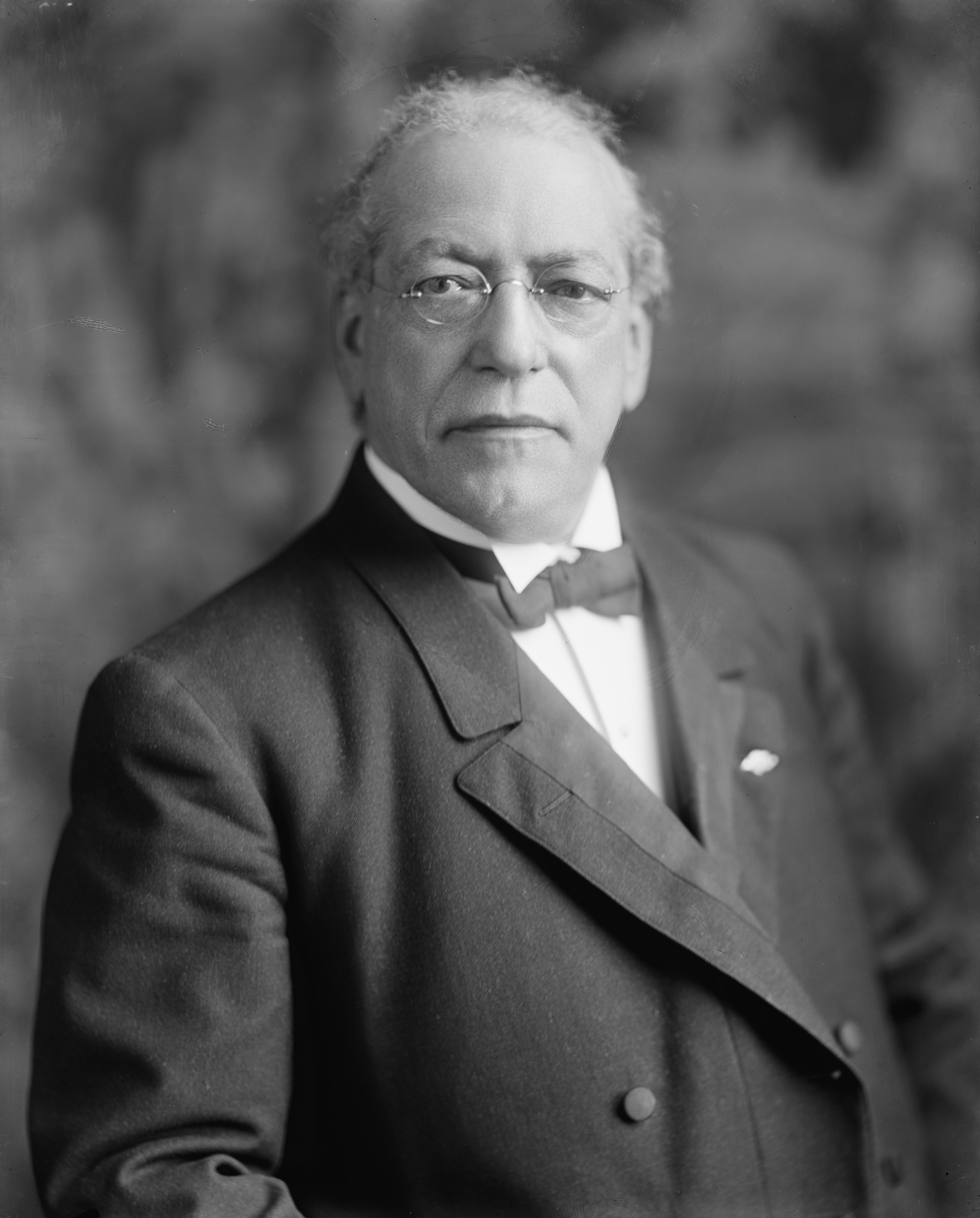
- Gompers c. 1910s

1st and 3rd President of the American Federation of Labor
- In office December 16, 1895 – December 11, 1924
- Preceded by: John McBride
- Succeeded by: William Green
- In office December 8, 1886 – January 1, 1895
- Preceded by: Office established
- Succeeded by: John McBride

2nd and 5th President of the Federation of Organized Trades and Labor Unions
- In office December 13, 1885 – December 8, 1886
- Preceded by: William McClelland
- Succeeded by: Office abolished
- In office November 24, 1882 – August 24, 1883
- Preceded by: Richard Powers
- Succeeded by: Patrick H. McLogan

Personal details
- Born: Samuel Gompers; January 27, 1850 Spitalfields, London, England
- Died: December 11, 1924 (aged 74) San Antonio, Texas, U.S.
- Resting place: Sleepy Hollow Cemetery
- Spouses: Sophia Julian (m. 1867; died 1920); Gertrude Gleaves
- Children: 12
- Occupation: Labor leader, cigar maker
- Samuel Gompers's voice Gompers speaks on labor's role in the war effort following American entry into World War I Recorded 1917

Samuel Gompers (né Gumpertz; January 27, 1850 – December 11, 1924) was a British-born American cigar maker and labor union leader. A key figure in American labor history, Gompers founded the American Federation of Labor (AFL) and served as the organization's president from 1886 to 1894, and from 1895 until his death in 1924. He promoted harmony among the various craft unions composing the AFL, trying to minimize jurisdictional battles. He promoted thorough organization and collective bargaining in order to secure shorter hours and higher wages, which he considered the essential first steps to emancipating labor.

He was against the AFL member unions taking political action to "elect their friends" and "defeat their enemies". In politics he mostly supported Democrats, and occasionally local Republicans. He led the opposition to immigration from China. During World War I, Gompers and the AFL energetically supported the war effort, attempting to avert strikes and boost morale while raising wage rates and expanding membership. He strongly opposed the antiwar labor groups, especially the Industrial Workers of the World (IWW).

== Early life ==
Gompers was born Samuel Gumpertz on January 27, 1850, in Spitalfields, a working-class area in the East End of London into a Jewish family that originally hailed from Amsterdam. He was the son of Sarah (Root) and Solomon Gumpertz, a cigar maker. At age six, Samuel was sent to the Jewish Free School to receive a basic education. His education there was brief, however, and a mere three months after his tenth birthday Gompers was sent to work as an apprentice cigar maker and earn money for his impoverished family.

Gompers continued his studies in night school, learning Hebrew and studying the Talmud—a process that he later likened to studying law. While he appreciated Hebrew in his youth, he held Yiddish in low regard.

== Young worker at the bench ==
Owing to dire financial straits, the Gompers family immigrated to the United States in 1863, settling on the Lower East Side of Manhattan in New York City. Gompers's father manufactured cigars at home, assisted for the first year and half by Samuel. In his free time, the young teenager formed a debate club with his friends, gaining practical experience in public speaking and parliamentary procedure. The club drew Gompers into contact with other upwardly mobile young men of the city, including young Irish-American Peter J. McGuire, who would later play a large role in the AFL.

In 1864, at age 14, Gompers joined the Cigar Makers Local Union No. 15, the English-speaking union of cigar makers in New York City. Gompers later recounted his days as a cigar maker at the bench in detail, emphasizing the place of craftsmanship in the production process:

"Any kind of an old loft served as a cigar shop. If there were enough windows, we had sufficient light for our work; if not, it was apparently no concern of the management. ... Cigar shops were always dusty from the tobacco stems and powdered leaves. Benches and work tables were not designed to enable the workmen to adjust bodies and arms comfortably to [the] work surface. Each workman supplied his own cutting board of lignum vitae and knife blade. The tobacco leaf was prepared by strippers who drew the leaves from the heavy stem and put them into pads of about fifty. The leaves had to be handled carefully to prevent tearing. The craftsmanship of the cigarmaker was shown in his ability to utilize wrappers to the best advantage to shave off the unusable to a hairbreadth, to roll so as to cover holes in the leaf and to use both hands so as to make a perfectly shaped and rolled product. These things a good cigarmaker learned to do more or less mechanically, which left us free to think, talk, listen, or sing. I loved the freedom of that work, for I had earned the mind-freedom that accompanied skill as a craftsman. I was eager to learn from discussion and reading or to pour out my feelings in song."

The day after his seventeenth birthday he married his co-worker, sixteen-year-old Sophia Julian. Together they had many children, but only six survived infancy.

In 1873, Gompers moved to the cigar maker David Hirsch & Company, a "high-class shop where only the most skilled workmen were employed". Gompers later called this change of employers "one of the most important changes in my life", for at Hirsch's—a union shop operated by an émigré German socialist—Gompers came into contact with an array of German-speaking cigar makers—"men of keener mentality and wider thought than any I had met before", he recalled. Gompers learned German and absorbed many of the ideas of his shopmates, developing a particular admiration for the ideas of the former secretary of the International Workingmen's Association, Karl Laurrell. Laurrell took Gompers under his wing, challenging his more simplistic ideas and urging Gompers to put his faith in the organized economic movement of trade unionism rather than the socialist political movement.

Gompers later recalled:

I remember asking Laurrell whether in his opinion I ought to keep in touch with the Socialist movement. He replied, 'Go to their meetings by all means, listen to what they have to say and understand them, but do not join the Party.' I never did, though it was my habit to attend their Saturday evening meetings. There were often good speakers present and the discussions were stimulating. Time and again, under the lure of new ideas, I went to Laurrell with glowing enthusiasm. Laurrell would gently say, 'Study your union card, Sam, and if the idea doesn't square with that, it ain't true.' My trade union card came to be my standard in all new problems.

Gompers complained that the socialist movement had been captured by Lassallean advocates of "political party action" rather than the "militant economic program of Marx". He warned delegates to the 1900 annual convention that when men became enthusiastic about socialism, "they usually lost interest in their union".

== Cigar Makers' International Union career ==
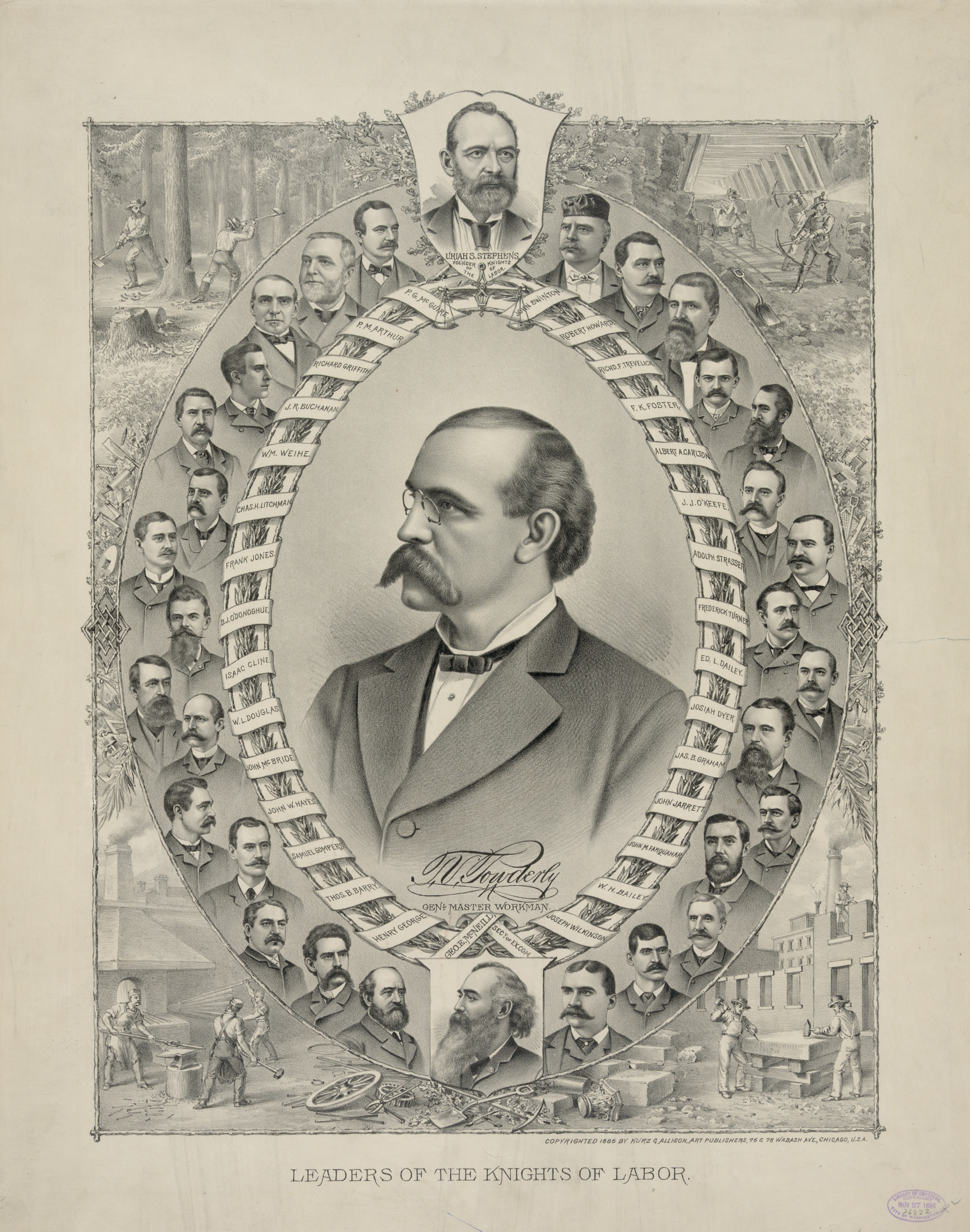
Print of the Knights of Labor leadership with Gompers near the bottom left corner, 1886

Gompers was elected president of Cigar Makers' International Union Local 144 in 1875. As was the case with other unions of the day, the Cigar Maker's Union nearly collapsed in the financial crisis of 1873–77, in which unemployment skyrocketed and ready availability of desperate workers willing to labor for subsistence wages put pressure upon the gains in wages and the shortening of hours achieved in union shops. Gompers and his friend Adolph Strasser used Local 144 as a base to rebuild the Cigar Makers' Union, introducing a high dues structure and implementing programs to pay out-of-work benefits, sick benefits, and death benefits for union members in good standing.

Gompers told the workers they needed to organize because wage reductions were almost a daily occurrence. He believed that the capitalists were only interested in profits, "and the time has come when we must assert our rights as workingmen. Every one present has the sad experience, that we are powerless in an isolated condition, while the capitalists are united; therefore, it is the duty of every Cigar Maker to join the organization". "One of the main objects of the organization", he concluded, "is the elevation of the lowest paid worker to the standard of the highest, and in time we may secure for every person in the trade an existence worthy of human beings."

He was elected second vice president of the Cigar Makers' International Union in 1886 when he was 36 and first vice president in 1896. Despite the commitment of time and energy entailed by his place as head of the American Federation of Labor, Gompers remained first vice president of the Cigar Makers until his death in December 1924.

== Leading the AFL ==
Gompers in 1894

Gompers helped found the Federation of Organized Trades and Labor Unions in 1881 as a coalition of like-minded unions. In 1886 it reorganized into the American Federation of Labor, with Gompers as president. With the exception of the year 1895, he would remain president of the organization until his death. In 1894 he became editor of the Federation's publication, The American Federationist.

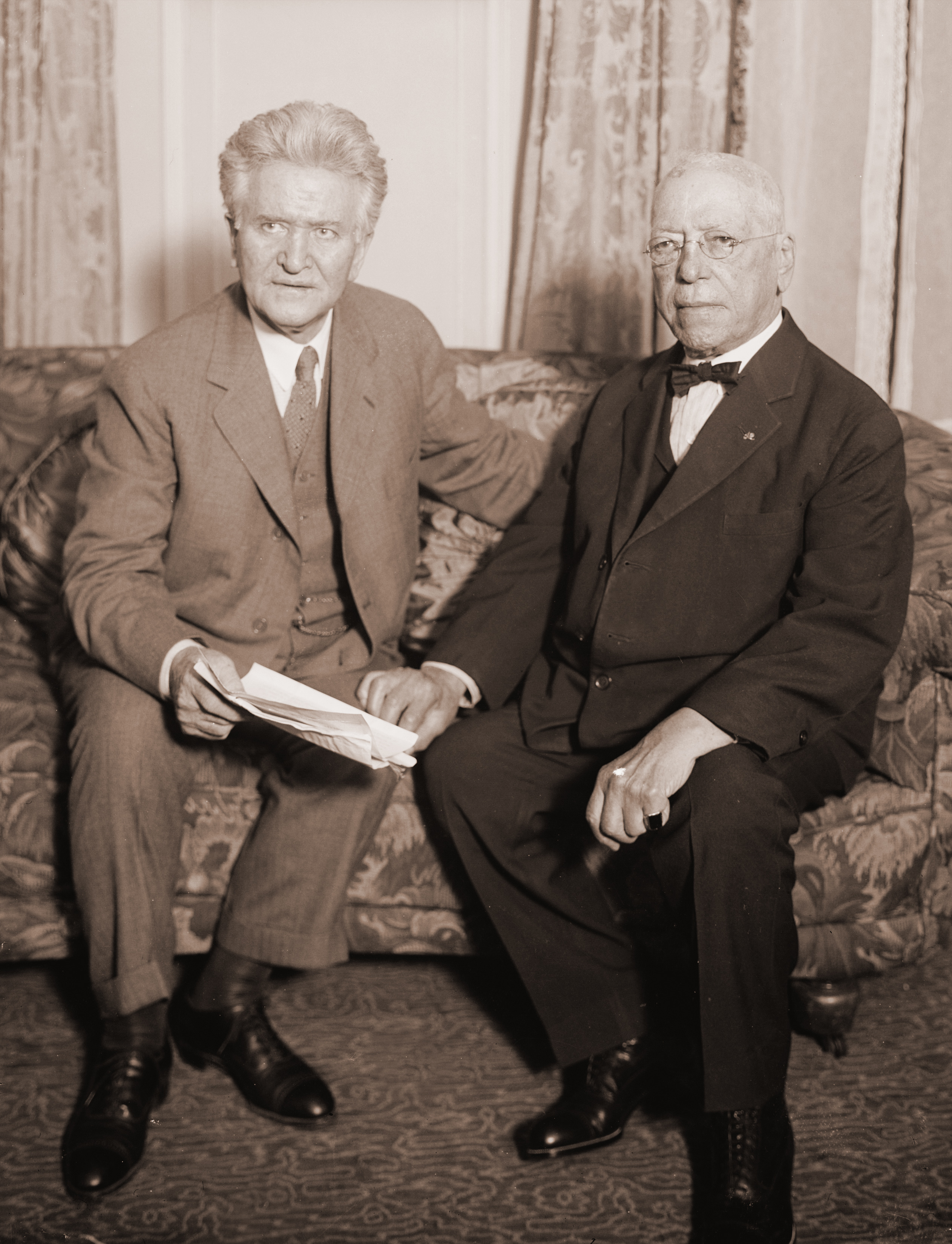
Shortly before his death, Gompers (right) sat down with 1924 independent presidential hopeful, Robert M. La Follette

Under Gompers's tutelage, the AFL coalition gradually gained strength, undermining the position previously held by the Knights of Labor, which as a result, had almost vanished by 1900. He was nearly jailed in 1911 for publishing, with John Mitchell, a boycott list, but in 1914 the Supreme Court overturned the sentence in Gompers v. Buck's Stove and Range Co..

He was the main spokesman for labor unions at the National Civic Federation after 1900.

=== Immigration and foreign affairs ===
Gompers, who had ties with the Cuban cigar workers in the U.S., called for American intervention in Cuba; he supported the resulting war with Spain in 1898. After the war, however, he joined the Anti-Imperialist League to oppose President William McKinley's plan to annex the Philippines. Mandel (1963) argues that his anti-imperialism was based on opportunistic fears of threats to labor's status from low-paid offshore workers and was founded on a sense of racial superiority to the peoples of the Philippines.

By the 1890s, Gompers was planning an international federation of labor, starting with the expansion of AFL affiliates in Canada, especially Ontario. He helped the Canadian Trades and Labour Congress with money and organizers, and by 1902, the AFL dominated the Canadian union movement.

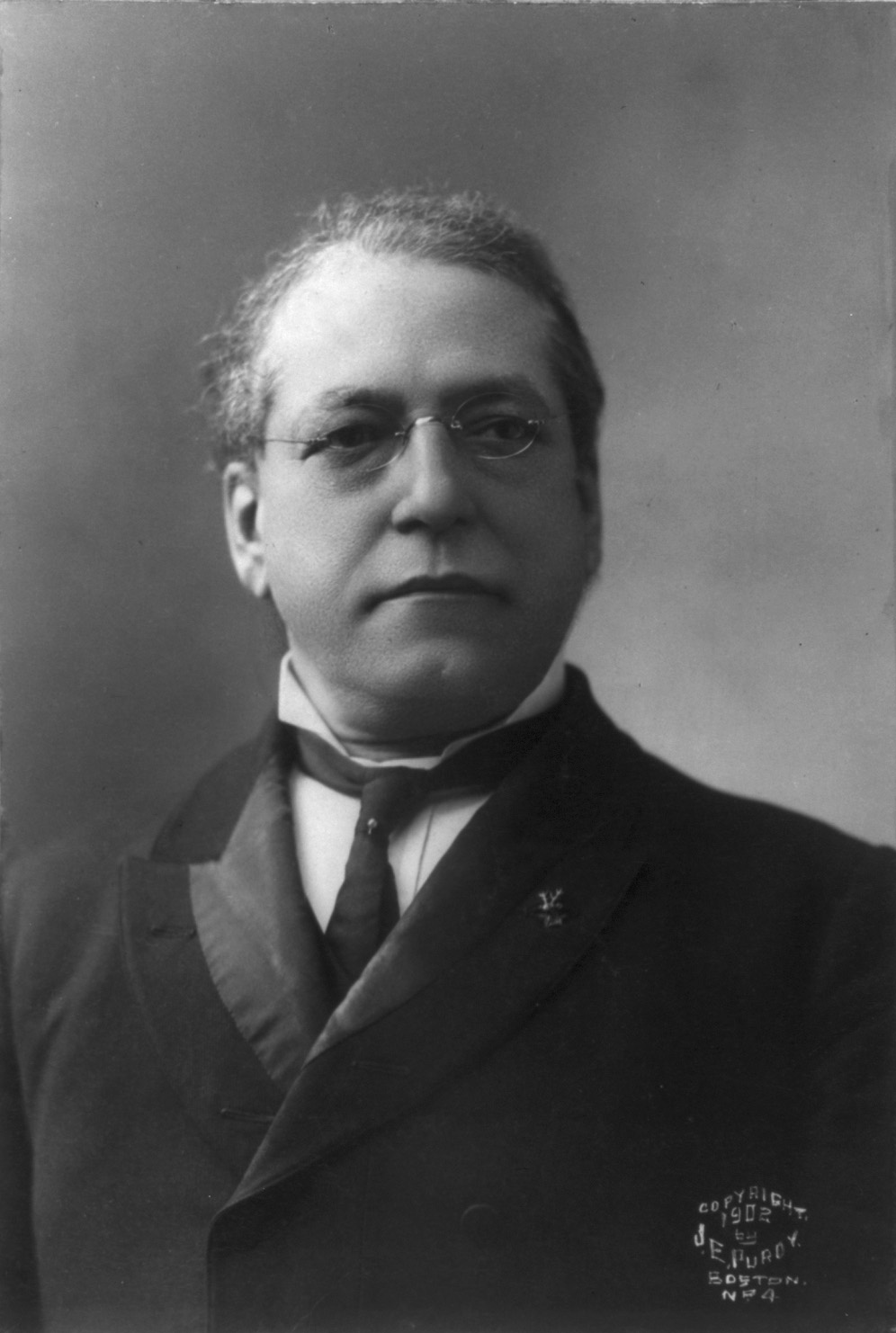
Gompers in 1902

Gompers, like most labor leaders, opposed unrestricted immigration from Europe because of the fear that it might lower wages of domestic union workers. He strongly opposed all immigration from Asia because it lowered wages and, in his judgement, represented an alien culture that could not be assimilated easily into that of the U.S. Gompers bragged that the Federation of Organized Trades and Labor Unions (FOTLU), later renamed the American Federation of Labor (AFL), "was the first national organization which demanded the exclusion of coolies from the United States". He and the AFL strongly supported the Chinese Exclusion Act of 1882 that banned the immigration of Chinese, and published a pamphlet entitled "Some reasons for Chinese exclusion. Meat vs. Rice. American Manhood against Asiatic Coolieism. Which shall survive?" in 1901. The AFL was instrumental in passing immigration restriction laws from the 1890s to the 1920s, such as the 1921 Emergency Quota Act and the Immigration Act of 1924 signed into law by President Calvin Coolidge; however, he supported Mexican membership in unions.

Major Republican leaders, such as President William McKinley and Senator Mark Hanna, made pro-labor statements. According to Gwendolyn Mink:

The escalation in labor disruptions and the expansion in union membership encouraged business leaders to promote union-employer cooperation in order to rationalize production and maximize efficiency. The AFL was the linchpin of such cooperation. Where AFL unions existed, the AFL could be called upon to manage labor conflict; equally important, the AFL was unlikely to sacrifice its organization to the volatility of industrial unionism.

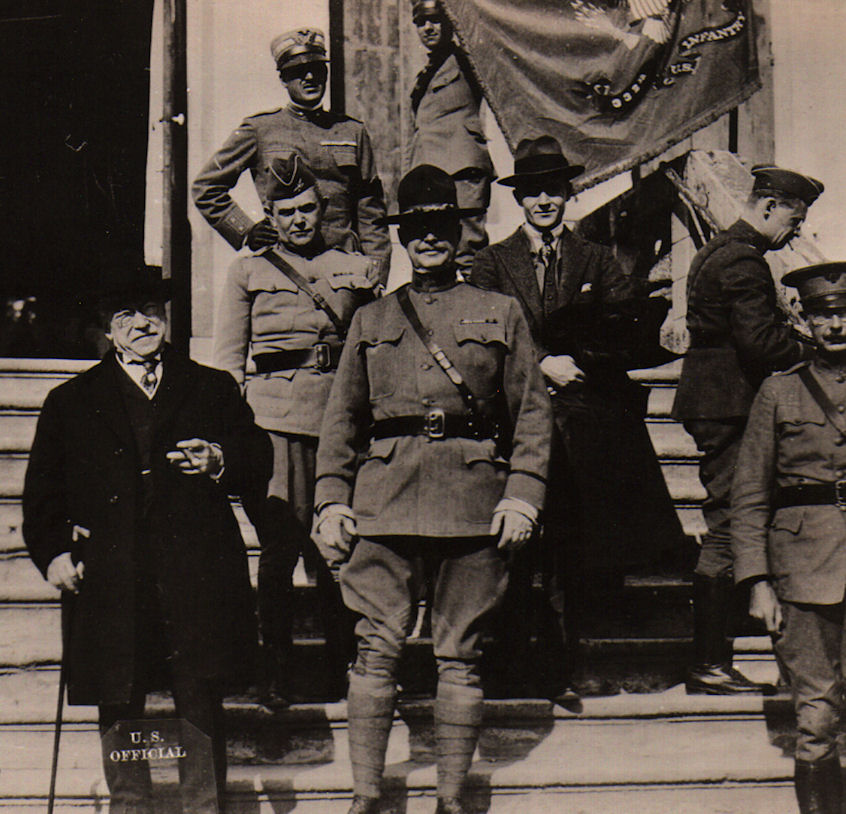
Gompers poses with American officers for a photograph in front of an Italian villa, 1918

During World War I Gompers was a strong supporter of the war effort. He was appointed by President Wilson to the Council of National Defense, where he chaired the Labor Advisory Board. He was also elected president of the American Alliance for Labor and Democracy, which was organized to suppress anti-war propaganda among workers. He attended the Paris Peace Conference in 1919 as an official advisor on labor issues. He was appointed chairman of the Commission on International Labour Legislation, whose recommendations for a workers' rights charter were incorporated into the Treaty of Versailles.

=== Post-war leadership ===
In addition to his work with the Commission on International Labour Legislation, Gompers was chairman of the US labor delegates at the International Federation of Trade Unions initial conference in Amsterdam, in July, 1919.

Despite his support for the war, he later supported amnesty for political prisoners who were convicted under Wartime Emergency Acts. He worked with Lucy Robins Lang, who became the executive secretary of the amnesty committee. Lang and Gompers also became friends.

=== Philosophy ===
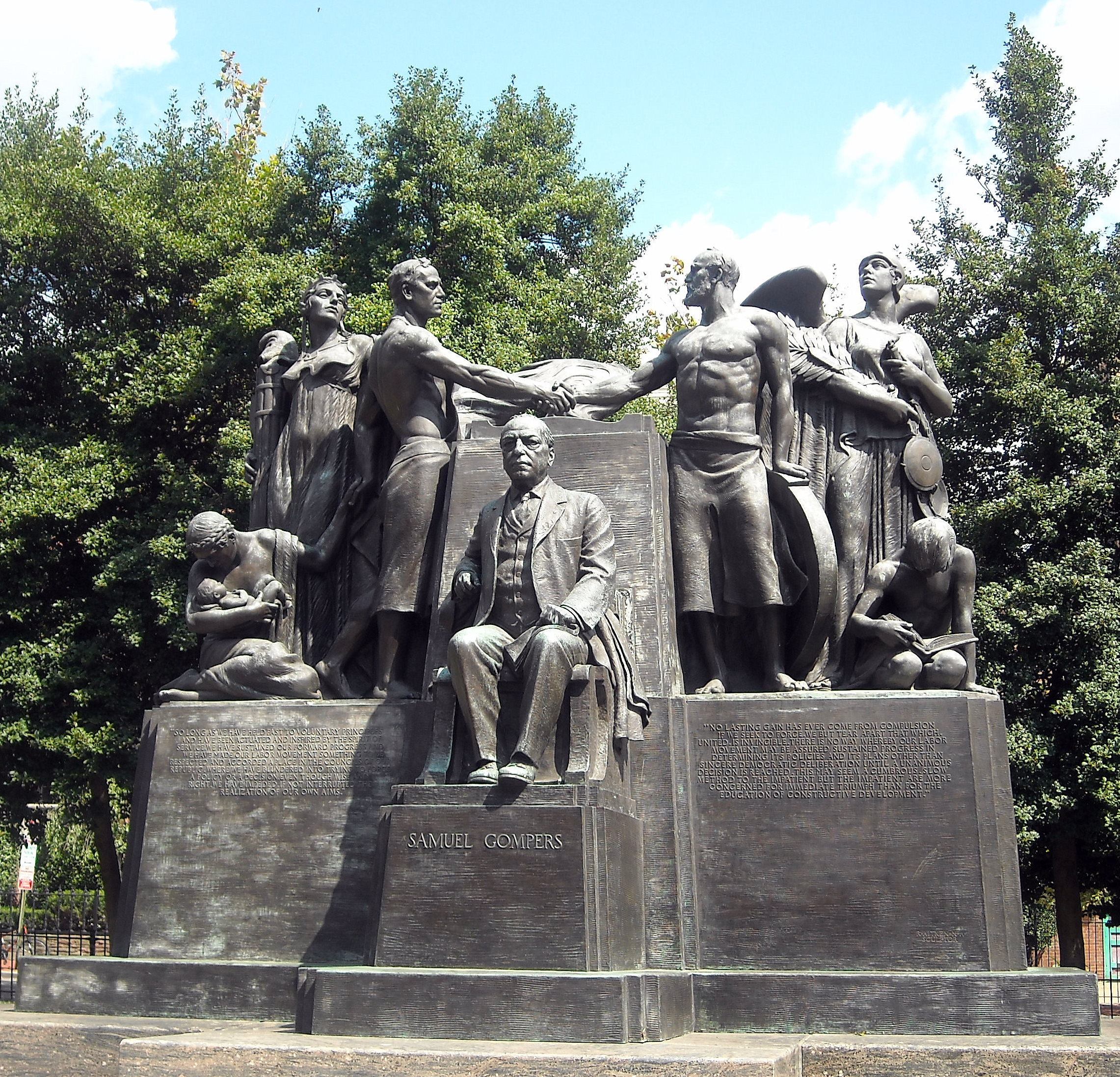
Samuel Gompers Memorial, 1933 by Robert Ingersoll Aitken, near Eleventh and Massachusetts Avenue, Washington, D.C.

During a severe period of national economic recession in the early 1890s, labor unrest was at its height. A volatile situation in Chicago in August 1893 caused the city's then mayor, Carter Harrison III, to warn that the preponderance of the unemployed would lead to riots that would "shake the country", unless Congress interceded. In late August 1893, Gompers addressed 25,000 unemployed workers who had massed on the shore of Lake Michigan. As reported in the Chicago Tribune on August 31, Gompers inveighed against the controllers of capital and the titans of industry and finance. "Why should the wealth of the country be stored in banks and elevators while the idle workman wanders homeless about the streets and the idle loafers who hoard the gold only to spend it on riotous living are rolling about in fine carriages from which they look out on peaceful meetings and call them riots?" Workers were also consumers, he asserted, and cuts to their wages would hurt not only their personal well-being but the economy as a whole. "When workers' wages are reduced, they necessarily use less, consume less, because of their reduced purchasing power", he wrote. "Only those who ignorantly or grabbingly believe in their avarice that business can prosper with wage reductions have yet to learn the lesson of industrial life and progress."

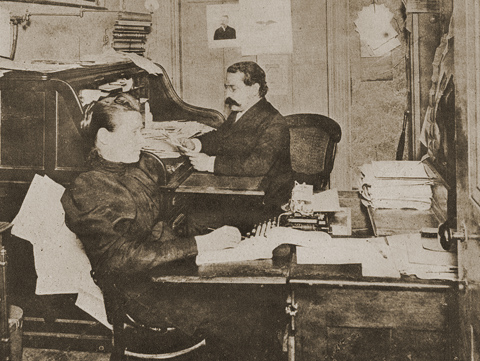
Gompers in the office of the American Federation of Labor, 1887

Gompers began his labor career familiar with, and sympathetic to, Georgism and the precepts of socialism, but gradually adopted a more conservative approach to labor relations. Labor Historian Melvyn Dubofsky has written, "By 1896 Gompers and the AFL were moving to make their peace with Capitalism and the American system ... Although the AFL had once preached the inevitability of class conflict and the need to abolish 'wage slavery', it slowly and almost imperceptibly began to proclaim the virtues of class harmony and the possibilities of a more benevolent Capitalism." For example, Alex Heron attributes the following quote to Gompers: "The greatest crime an employer can perpetrate on his employees is to fail to operate at a profit". Gompers began to take a neutral stance in politics after the failure of the efforts to elect Henry George as mayor of New York, but Gompers remained a Single Tax Georgist later in life.

Gompers’ philosophy of labor unions centered on economic ends for workers, such as higher wages, shorter hours, and safe working conditions so that they could enjoy an "American" standard of living—a decent home, decent food and clothing, and money enough to educate their children. He thought economic organization was the most direct way to achieve these improvements, but he did encourage union members to participate in politics and to vote with their economic interests in mind.

Gompers’ trade union philosophy and his devotion to collective bargaining with business proved to be too conservative for more radical leaders, such as Ed Boyce, president of the Western Federation of Miners (WFM), and, later, WFM secretary-treasurer Bill Haywood. In 1905, Haywood and the WFM helped to establish the Industrial Workers of the World (IWW), whose members were known as Wobblies, with the goal of organizing the entire working class. The IWW's long-term goal was to supplant capitalism with a workers' commonwealth. Nonetheless, when government abuses against the leaders of the WFM seemed too egregious, Gompers relented and offered assistance.

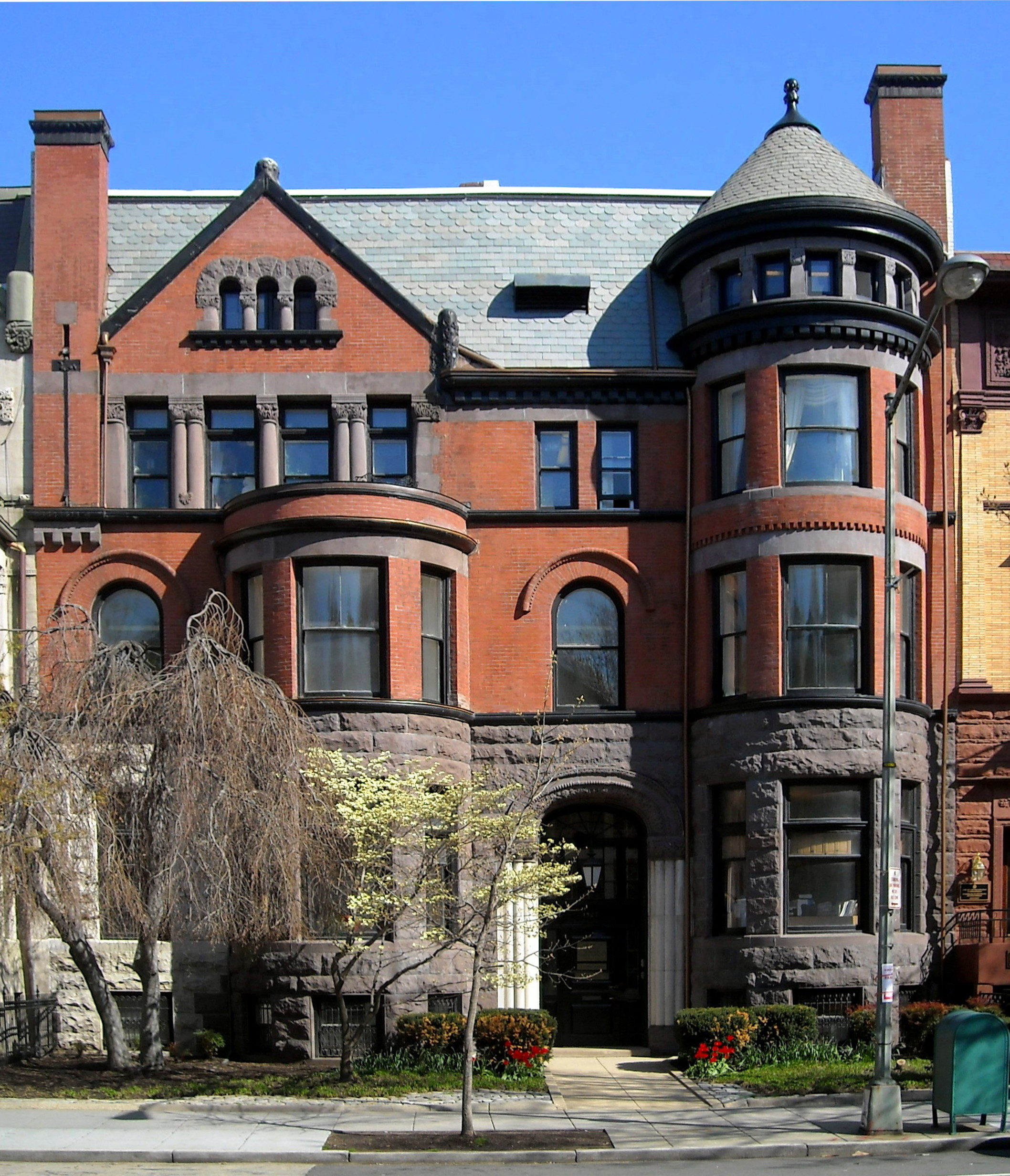
During the early 1920s, Gompers resided in this Dupont Circle home in Washington, D.C.

Gompers and his AFL unions vigorously fought the IWW in the U.S. and in Latin America, viewing them as a disruptive dual union that tried harder to destroy capitalism than to help workers. He cooperated with widespread government arrests of union leaders for the IWW's militant opposition to the World War. He said, "the IWW's ... are exactly what the Bolsheviki are in Russia, and we have seen what the IWW Bolsheviki in Russia have done for the working people."

Gompers led the anti-Socialist faction inside the AFL, losing to Socialists only once, in 1894. He argued that socialists believed workers and unions could never co-exist with business interests and wanted to use the labor unions to advance their more radical political causes. By 1920 Gompers had largely marginalized Socialist influence to a few unions, notably coal miners and the needle trades.

=== Freemason ===
Gompers was a leading Freemason, reaching the 32º in the Scottish Rite Valley of Washington D.C. in 1906. In 1920 he wrote, "In my Masonic life, I have visited lodges in many lands, and I have learned that Freemasonry in many countries, particularly in Latin countries, is the principal means whereby freedom of conscience, of thought, and expression is preserved."

== Views on race ==
In a 1913 interview with the Seattle Star newspaper, Gompers said: "While the white children are slaving in the mills the black children are going to school. That is why I say that when the present generation of children in the cotton states of the South have grown to manhood and womanhood, and if the literacy test is applied to voters, the whites will be disenfranchised and the blacks alone will vote. The blacks will be the superior race."

== Poor health, death ==
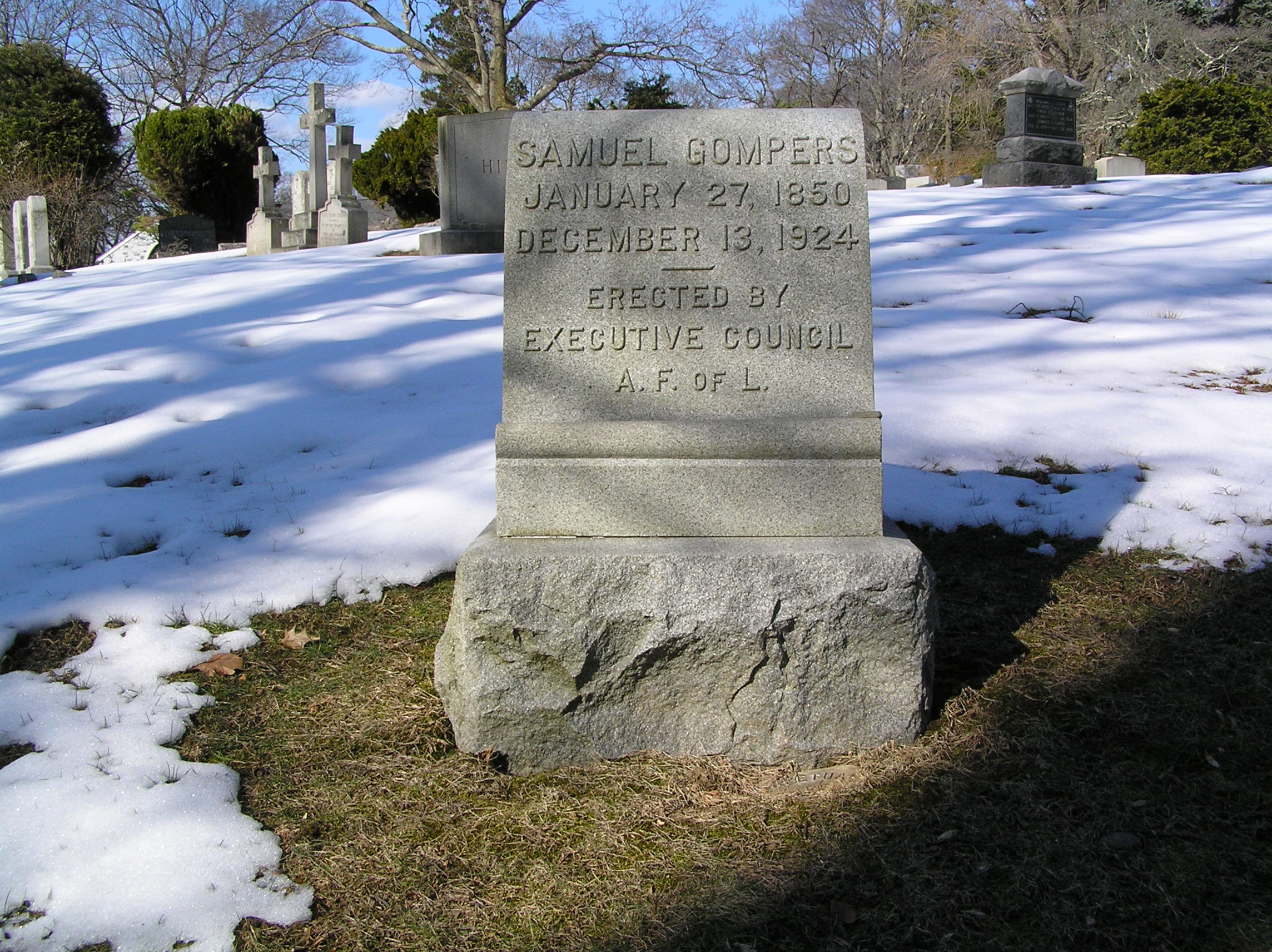
Gompers's grave site

By 1919, Gompers realized he was going blind—as his father had. He kept the condition secret, and maintained a busy schedule. He gave up editing The American Federationist magazine, and had an aide read the newspapers aloud. In public he always had an aide present who would quietly identify the people he was talking with. Gompers's health went into serious decline starting in February 1923, when a serious bout of influenza sent him to the hospital, sidelining him from work for six weeks. No sooner had he recovered from the influenza, than he was stricken by a case of bronchitis that laid him low again. By June 1924 Gompers, who suffered from diabetes, could no longer walk without assistance, and he was hospitalized again, this time suffering from congestive heart failure and uremia. Gompers collapsed in Mexico City on Saturday, December 6, 1924, while attending a meeting of the Pan-American Federation of Labor. It was recognized that his condition was critical and that he might not survive for long. Gompers expressed a desire to die on American soil and he was placed aboard a special train that sped toward the border. He died in San Antonio, Texas. Gompers was buried at the Sleepy Hollow Cemetery in Sleepy Hollow, New York. Gompers is buried only a few yards away from industrialist Andrew Carnegie, another important figure of industry in the Gilded Age.

== Legacy ==
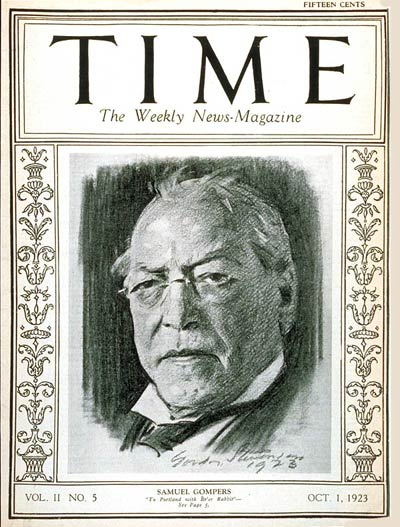
Time cover, October 1, 1923

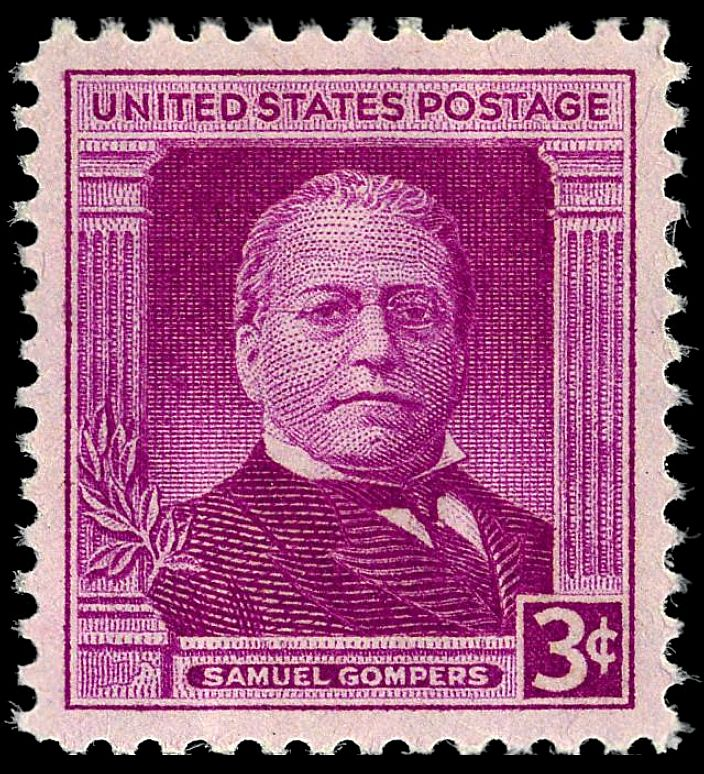
Samuel Gompers memorial issue of 1950

Gompers inspired later generations of labor leaders, such as George Meany, who paid tribute to Gompers as a European immigrant who pioneered a distinctly American brand of unionism. Reuben Soderstrom, president of the Illinois State Federation of Labor and the Illinois AFL-CIO from 1930 to 1970, cited his 1923 encounter with Gompers as particularly formative. Gompers chided Soderstrom after the latter expressed frustration with the slow pace of progress being made in a local strike, telling him "Young man, you know you can climb the highest mountain if you've got the patience to do it one step at a time." Reuben never forgot those words, stating decades later "that philosophy had a lot to do with guiding the activities I've been engaged in."

His belief led to the development of procedures for collective bargaining and contracts between labor and management that remain in use today. In practice, AFL unions were important in industrial cities, where they formed a central labor office to coordinate the actions of different AFL unions. Issues of wages and hours were the usual causes of strikes, but many strikes were assertions of jurisdiction, so that the plumbers, for example, used strikes to ensure that all major construction projects in the city used union plumbers. In this goal they were ideally supported by all the other construction unions in the AFL fold.

Gompers is the subject of statuary in several major American cities. A bronze monument honoring Gompers by the sculptor Robert Aitken is in Gompers Square on Massachusetts Avenue in Washington, D.C. On September 3, 2007, a life-size statue of Gompers was unveiled at Gompers Park, named after the labor leader in 1929, on the northwest side of Chicago. This is the first statue of a labor leader in Chicago. Local unions throughout Chicago donated their time and money to build the monument. A U.S. Navy destroyer tender was named for Gompers. The Samuel Gompers Houses, a public housing development on the Lower East Side of New York, is named in his honor. There are schools named for Gompers in Philadelphia, Madison, Wisconsin, Los Angeles, San Diego, Phoenix, Arizona and The Bronx, New York, a school in Chicago renamed to Jesse Owens Community Elementary, and a school in Detroit.

On January 27, 1950, the centennial of Gompers's birth, the U. S. Post Office Department issued a 3¢ commemorative postage stamp in the Famous Americans series with his picture. Gompers enjoyed listening to the services of the Episcopal National Cathedral which memorialized him on a stained glass window.

== Works ==
- Seventy Years of Life and Labor: An Autobiography. In two volumes. New York: E.P. Dutton and Co., 1925. vol 2 online; vol. 1–2 online
- Samuel Gompers Papers. Stuart Bruce Kaufman, Peter J. Albert, and Grace Palladino (eds.) In twelve volumes. Urbana: University of Illinois Press, 1989–2010.

=== Other books and pamphlets ===
- Address of Samuel Gompers, Before the Arbitration Conference, Held at Chicago, Ill. Dec. 17, 1900, Under the Auspices of the National Civic Federation. Washington, D.C.: American Federation of Labor, 1901.
- Gompers, Samuel; Gutstadt, Herman (1902). Meat vs. rice; American manhhod against Asiatic coolieism, which shall survive?. American Federation of Labor printed as Senate document 137 (1902); reprinted with intro. and appendices by Asiatic Exclusion League, 1908 – via HathiTrust Digital Library.
- Organized Labor: Its Struggles, Its Enemies and Fool Friends. Washington, D.C.: American Federation of Labor, n.d. [1904].
- Essence of Labor's Contention on the Injunction Abuse. Washington, D.C.: American Federation of Labor, 1908.
- Speech Delivered October 13, 1908, at Dayton, Ohio. Denver: Carson-Harper, n.d. [1908].
- Justice Wright's Denial of Free Speech and Free Press. Washington, D.C.: American Federation of Labor, 1909.
- Labor in Europe and America: Personal Observations from an American Viewpoint of Life and Conditions of Working Men in Great Britain, France, Holland, Germany, Italy, ... [etc.]. New York: Harper Brothers, 1910.
- The McNamara Case; Also, an Appeal for Funds to Secure a Fair and Impartial Trial. n.c. [Washington, D.C.]: McNamara Ways and Means Committee, n.d. [1911].
- Investigation of Taylor System of Shop Management: Hearings before... Washington, D.C.: U.S. Government Printing Office, 1911.
- The American Labor Movement: Its Makeup, Achievements and Aspirations. Washington, D.C.: American Federation of Labor, n.d. [1914].
- The Attitude of the American Federation of Labor toward Industrial Education. New York: C.S. Nathan, n.d. [1914].
- The Essence of the Clayton Law. Washington, D.C.: American Federation of Labor, n.d. [1914].
- The Double Edge of Labor's Sword: Discussion and Testimony on socialism and Trade-Unionism before the Commission on Industrial Relations. With Morris Hillquit and Max S. Hayes. Chicago: Socialist Party National Office, 1914.
- Labor and Antitrust Legislation: The Facts, Theory and Argument: A Brief and Appeal. Washington, D.C.: American Federation of Labor, 1914.
- The Workers and the Eight-Hour Workday; And, the Shorter Workday: Its Philosophy. Washington, D.C.: American Federation of Labor, n.d. [1915].
- Preparedness for National Defense: An Address Delivered before the Sixteenth Annual Meeting of the National Civic Federation on January 18, 1916, at Washington... Washington, D.C.: U.S. Government Printing Office, 1916.
- America's Fight for the Preservation of Democracy: An Address Delivered by Samuel Gompers at Minneapolis, Minn.: And the Declaration of Principles. n.c. [Washington, D.C.]: American Alliance for Labor and Democracy, 1917.
- Address by Samuel Gompers, President of the American Federation of Labor: Under the Auspices of the National Security League at Chicago, September 14, 1917. New York: National Security League, 1917.
- Should a Political Labor Party be Formed? An address by Samuel Gompers... to a labor conference held at New York city, December 9, 1918. Washington, D.C.: American Federation of Labor, 1918.
- Labour and the War: Speeches Delivered in the Canadian House of Commons, April 26, 1918, and Before the Canadian Club, Ottawa, April 27, 1918. Ottawa: [government publication], 1918.
- American Labor and the War. New York: G. H. Doran, 1919.
- Labor and the Common Welfare. New York: E. P. Dutton and Co., 1919.
- Labor and the Employer. New York: E. P. Dutton and Co., 1920.
- Collective Bargaining: Labor's Proposal to Insure Greater Industrial Peace: With Questions and Answers Explaining the Principle. Washington, D.C.: American Federation of Labor, 1920.
- Debate between Samuel Gompers and Henry J. Allen at Carnegie Hall, New York, May 28, 1920. With Harry Justin Allen. New York: E. P. Dutton and Co., 1920.
- [Washington, D.C.: American Federation of Labor, The Eight-Hour Workday: Its Inauguration, Enforcement, and Influences]. Washington, D.C.: American Federation of Labor, n.d. [1920].
- Labor's Protest against a Rampant Tragedy. Washington, D.C.: American Federation of Labor, 1920.
- Samuel Gompers on the Kansas Court of Industrial Relations Law: "Laws to make strikes unlawful will not prevent them." Washington, D.C.: American Federation of Labor, 1920.
- Letters to a Bishop: Correspondence between Samuel Gompers, President of the American Federation of Labor, and Bishop William A. Quayle, of the Methodist Episcopal Church. Washington, D.C.: American Federation of Labor, 1920.
- The Union Shop and Its Antithesis. Washington, D.C.: American Federation of Labor, 1920.
- The Truth about Soviet Russia and Bolshevism. Washington, D.C.: American Federation of Labor, n.d. [1920].
- Out of Their Own Mouths: A Revelation and an Indictment of Sovietism. With William English Walling. New York: E. P. Dutton and Co., 1921.
- The Fundamental Issues: Present Industrial Controversies an Expression of Vital Conflict between Industry and Finance. New York: The New York Times, 1922.
- Correspondence between Mr. Newton D. Baker, President of the Cleveland Chamber of Commerce and Mr. Samuel Gompers, President of the American Federation of Labor. With Newton D. Baker. Washington, D.C.: American Federation of Labor, 1923.
- Address of Samuel Gompers, President of the American Federation of Labor: Before the Convention of the United Hatters of North America, New York City, April 16, 1923. Washington, D.C.: American Federation of Labor, n.d. [1923].

=== Articles ===
- "The Limitations of Conciliation and Arbitration", Annals of the American Academy of Political and Social Science, vol. 20 (July 1902), pp. 29–34. in JSTOR
- "Organized Labor's Attitude toward Child Labor", Annals of the American Academy of Political and Social Science, vol. 27 (March 1906), pp. 79–83. in JSTOR
- "Attitude of Labor towards Government Regulation of Industry", Annals of the American Academy of Political and Social Science, vol. 32 (July 1908), pp. 75–81. in JSTOR
- "Free Speech and the Injunction Order", Annals of the American Academy of Political and Social Science, vol. 36, no. 2 (September 1910), pp. 1–10. in JSTOR
- "European War Influences upon American Industry and Labor", Annals of the American Academy of Political and Social Science, vol. 61, (September 1915), pp. 4–10. in JSTOR
- "Labor Standards after the War", Annals of the American Academy of Political and Social Science, vol. 81 (January 1919), pp. 182–186. in JSTOR
- "The Development and Accessibility of Production Records Essential to Intelligent and Just Determination of Wage-Rates", Annals of the American Academy of Political and Social Science, vol. 100 (March 1922), pp. 54–55. in JSTOR

== Primary sources ==
- Gompers, Samuel. Seventy Years of Life and Labor (1925, 1985 reprint); online
- Gompers, Samuel. The Samuel Gompers Papers edited by Stuart B. Kaufman, Peter J. Albert, and Grace Palladino. (University of Illinois Press, 1986–2013). The definitive edition of all important letters to and from Gompers. Published in 12 volumes; index in vol 13. partly online.
- Stern, Gerald Emanuel, ed. Gompers (Prentice Hall, 1971), excerpts from 31 primary and secondary sources.

Non-profit organization positions
Preceded by Richard Powers	President of the Federation of Organized Trades and Labor Unions; 1882–1883	Succeeded by Patrick H. McLogan
Preceded by W. M. McClelland	President of the Federation of Organized Trades and Labor Unions; 1885–1886	Succeeded by Federation reorganized
Preceded by Federation founded	President of the American Federation of Labor; 1886–1894	Succeeded by John McBride
Preceded by John McBride	President of the American Federation of Labor; 1895–1924	Succeeded by William Green
Preceded by New position	American Federation of Labor delegate to the Trades Union Congress; 1895; With: P. J. McGuire	Succeeded by Jeremiah Sullivan; Adolph Strasser
Awards and achievements
Preceded by J. P. Morgan Jr.	Cover of Time; 1 October 1923	Succeeded by H. H. Asquith
