= John P. Frey =

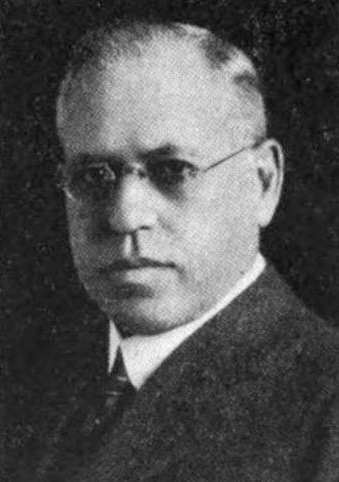
- Frey c. 1927
- Born: John Philip Frey; February 24, 1871; Mankato, Minnesota
- Died: November 29, 1957 (aged 86); Washington, D.C.
- Burial place: Arlington National Cemetery
- Occupation: Labor activist
- Political party: Republican
- Spouse: Nellie J. Higgins (m. 1891)
- Children: 3

John Philip Frey (February 24, 1871 – November 29, 1957) was a labor activist and president of the American Federation of Labor's Metal Trades Department during a crucial period in American labor history.

== Early life ==
Frey was born in Mankato, Minnesota on February 24, 1871, the son of an immigrant German father, Leopold, and an immigrant French mother, Julia. He received a public school education and became an iron molder in Worcester, Massachusetts, at the age of 16. He married Nellie Josephine Higgins on June 10, 1891.

In 1893, Frey was elected president of the local International Molders and Foundry Workers Union of North America (IMFWU). He resigned the position to become treasurer of the New England regional board of the IMFWU in 1898, and a year later was elected vice president of the Massachusetts Federation of Labor.

== Trade union career ==
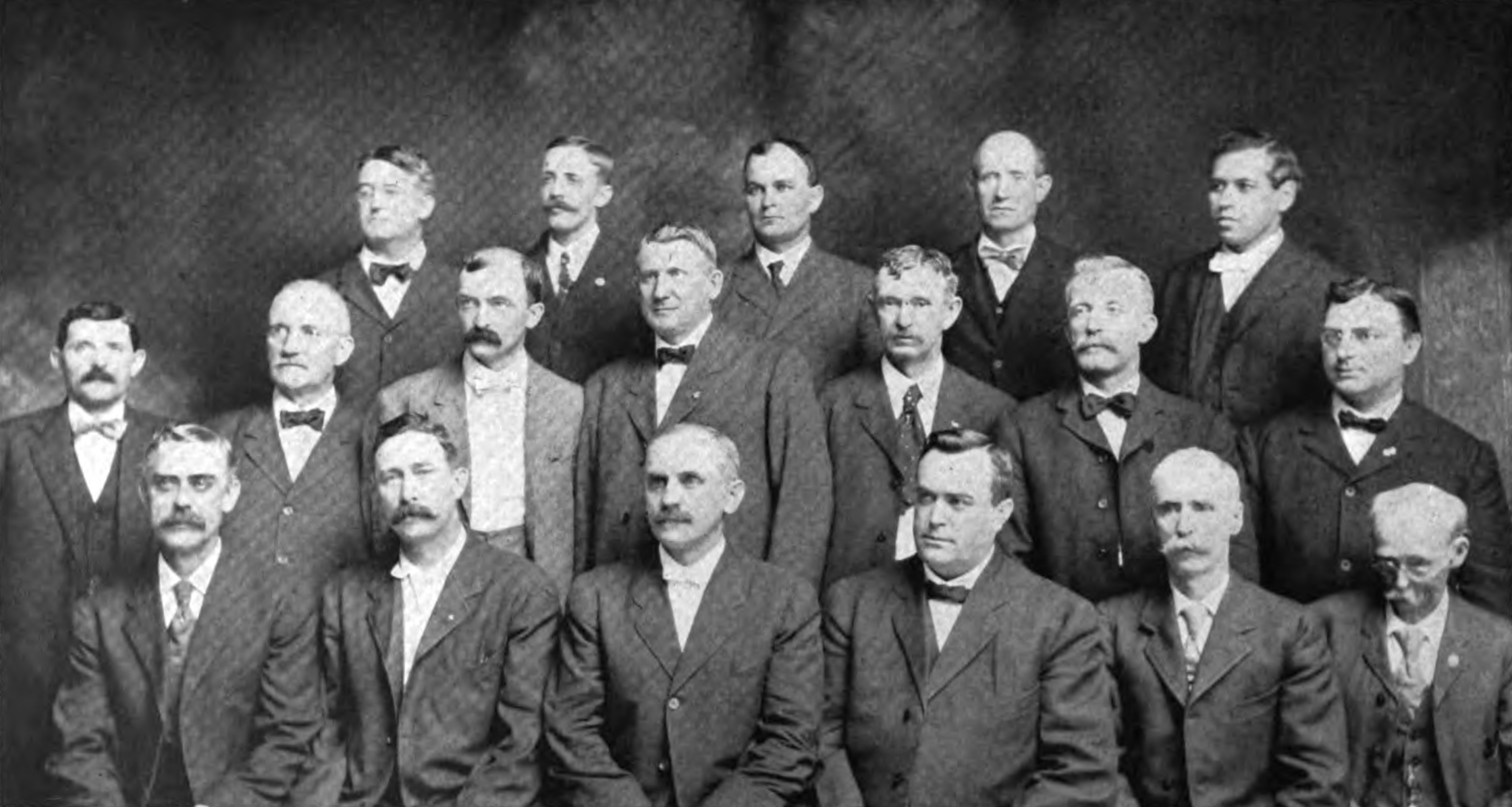
National Officers of the International Iron Molders' Union of North America, 1907. Top row (L-R): John R. O'Leary, W. T. Probert, Lawrence O'Keefe, John Manning, John P. Frey. Middle row: Victor Klieber, John Campbell, John I. Nolan, George Gunrey, John Bradley, William Skimerton, Joseph M. Dutton. Bottom row: Richard H. Metcalf, James Brown, Joseph F. Valentine, M. J. Keough, E. J. Denny, Alex Faulkner.

In 1900, Frey was elected a vice president of the IMFWU. He became editor of the Molders' Journal in 1903 (he resigned the editorship in 1926). Frey used his position to augment his power within the union as well as suppress progressive elements in the rank and file. For example, in 1924 delegates to the IMFWU convention passed resolutions calling for a labor party and industrial unionization in the metal trades. But Frey and the other officers of the union decided to ignore the will of the Molders' convention and oppose similar resolutions offered at the American Federation of Labor (AFL) convention that same year.

Frey moved to Ohio and was elected president of the Ohio State Federation of Labor in 1924. He stepped down to become its secretary-treasurer in 1927.

In 1918, Frey became chairman of the National Bureau of Economic Research, helping to raise money and incorporate the organization in 1920. He remained chairman of the board of directors until 1927.

The Metal Trades Department of the AFL had been organized on January 15, 1908. As a vice president of the IMFWU, Frey was automatically a delegate to the Metal Trades convention. Frey used his position as a delegate to oppose American entry into World War I. Later, however, Frey became a fierce opponent of anything German.

Frey's advocacy of craft unionism and anti-communism proved popular among his fellow Metal Trades delegates. He was elected secretary of the department in 1927, and president in 1934. He served in that capacity until his retirement in 1950.

During the presidency of AFL president William Green, Frey was one of the most influential men in the American labor movement. Frey, long with Matthew Woll, president of the International Photo-Engravers Union of North America, worked behind the scenes of the AFL executive council to craft AFL policies and positions, heavily influencing the passive Green. Green's rabid anti-communism, his apolitical views, his refusal to consider governmental action as relief for working people's problems, and unwavering support for craft unionism all came from Frey and Woll.

== Views and policies ==
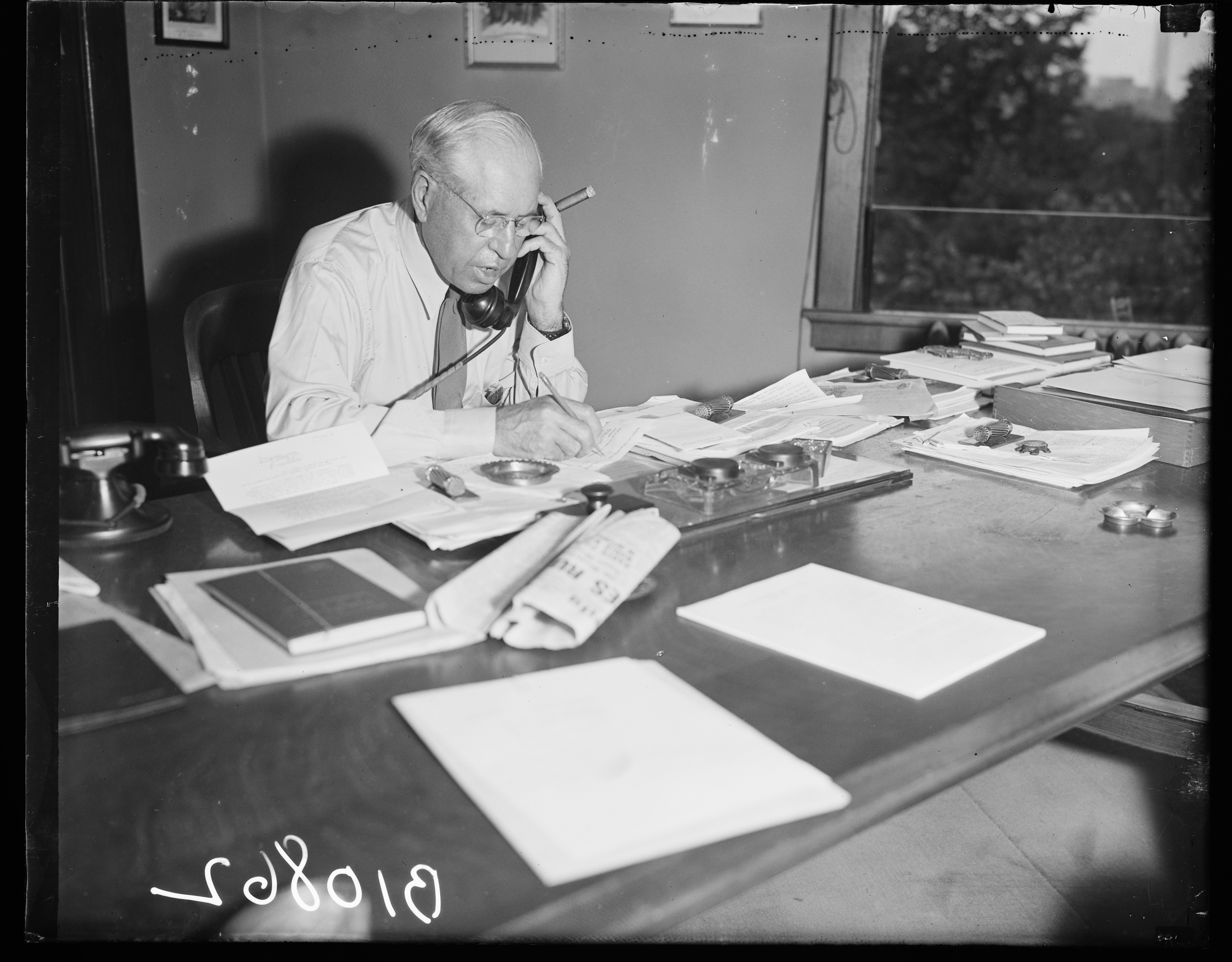
Frey at his desk, 1936

Frey used the Metal Trades Department to shape the American labor movement according to his own views. When the International Union of Mine, Mill, and Smelter Workers led 5,000 copper miners and craftsmen out on strike in Butte, Montana in 1934, Frey personally intervened. To Frey, the strike was a direct attack on the employer. Strikes led to radicalism and violence, causing a downward spiral of hate and brutality which did more harm than good. Frey often attacked the sitdown strike as "made in Moscow." Ending the Butte strike—at any cost—was Frey's chief goal. Subsequently, Frey negotiated a give-back agreement for the craftsmen which helped to break the strike and then bullied leaders of the mine workers into accepting the agreement as well. The sell-out broke the back of the labor movement in Butte for a decade.

Frey also became active in the labor education movement. A large number of labor colleges had been formed by various unions between 1918 and 1921. In order to coordinate the activities of these labor colleges and provide them with a degree of autonomy, the AFL supported the Workers' Education Bureau of America in 1921. Frey served as an executive board member of the Bureau. One such college, Brookwood Labor College in Katonah, New York, was created by the AFL in 1921. Brookwood attracted a large number of left-wing and communist labor educators, however. Brookwood came under increasing attack from Frey and other members of the Workers' Education Bureau, until it finally closed in 1937.

The Brookwood incident also points up Frey's rabid anti-communist views. Like many of his colleagues, including Samuel Gompers, William Green and Matthew Woll, Frey believed that the best defense for the American labor movement was to convince employers and government regulators that labor was completely supported the capitalist system and had employers' best interests at heart.

Frey was also not above red-baiting in order to achieve his other goals, and often used his position as the president of the Metal Trades Department to attack progressives, left-wing activists, socialists, communists and their ideas and policies anywhere within the labor movement. In June 1954, Frey accused Harold Pritchett, president of the International Woodworkers of America, of being a member of the Communist Party. Frey's accusations led to Pritchett's imprisonment and the decline of the Woodworkers union.

Frey's anti-communism took more concrete form as well. He joined the Army Reserve and rose to the level of lieutenant colonel by 1928. He then became the liaison officer between the AFL and the U.S. Army. In the 1930s, left-wing writers accused him of having a relationship with Army Intelligence, working to undercut democratic but progressive labor movements both at home and overseas. No relationship was ever proven, but Frey returned to active duty at the same rank during World War II—serving in the Army Specialist Reserve.

Frey was a leader within the AFL of craft unionism. When John L. Lewis led a number of unions to form the Congress of Industrial Organizations (CIO), Frey viciously attacked the CIO and its leaders on a wide variety of grounds. In August 1938, he spent three days accusing the Congress of Industrial Organizations of being a Communist front organization before the House Un-American Activities Committee.

Frey's conservatism led him to oppose a number of policies strongly supported by the American labor movement today. He believed that Social Security would distract unions' attention from more important goals. He denounced government-provided unemployment insurance as communistic. When railroad unions called for public ownership of the railroads in 1920, Frey ridiculed their position as "made in Germany" and helped Gompers and Woll to keep the convention from endorsing the position.

Frey retired from active union life in 1950. He was a lifelong Republican, and had three children. He died in Washington, D.C., on November 29, 1957, and was buried at Arlington National Cemetery.

Frey was considered a scholar in the labor movement, although he had little formal education. He wrote six books: An American Molder in Europe (1911), The Labor Injunction (1922), Calamity of Prosperity (1930), Bakers Domination (1933), Calamity of Recovery (1934) and Craft Unions of Ancient and Modern Times (1944).

Trade union offices
| Preceded by Andrew Furuseth; James J. Creamer | American Federation of Labor delegate to the Trades Union Congress; 1909; With: Samuel Gompers; Bernard A. Larger | Succeeded by William Bauchop Wilson; Thomas V. O'Connor |
| Preceded by A. J. Berres | Secretary-Treasurer of the Metal Trades Department; 1927–1933 | Succeeded by William A. Calvin |
| Preceded by James O'Connell | President of the Metal Trades Department; 1935–1951 | Succeeded by James A. Brownlow |
