= Keith Johnson =

Keith Johnson may refer to:

- Keith Johnson (cricket administrator) (1894–1972), Australian cricket administrator
- Keith Johnson (Australian politician) (1929–1995), Australian politician
- Keith Johnson (baseball) (born 1971), former professional baseball player
- Keith Johnson (cricketer) (born 1935), South African cricketer
- Keith Johnson (actor) (born 1953), African-American actor
- Keith Johnson (soccer) (born 1980), American Paralympic soccer player
- Keith Johnson (sailor) (1897-1960), Singaporean Olympic sailor
- Keith Johnson (applied linguist) (born 1944), British linguist
- Keith Johnson (phonetician), American linguist
- Keith Johnson (neurologist), American radiologist
- Keith Johnson (trade unionist), Canadian-American trade union leader
- Keith "Wonderboy" Johnson (born 1972), American gospel musician
- Keith Johnson (Idaho politician), Idaho state controller, 2002–2007
- Keith Johnson (trumpeter), trumpet player with The Butterfield Blues Band

== See also ==
- Keith Johnston (disambiguation)
- Keith Johnstone (born 1933), drama instructor
