= Workers' Education Bureau of America =

Former trade union of the United States

Workers' Education Bureau of America or WEB or Bureau (1921–1951) was an organization established to assist labor colleges and other worker training centers involved in the American labor movement. The WEB was an important development in labor education in the 1920s. Founded in 1921, it served as an informational clearinghouse for labor education organizing forums around the country and assisting local programs.

== History ==
The Workers' Education Bureau of America was founded in 1921 by a group of United States-based unionists and educators.

WEB received financial, political, and consultative support from American Federation of Labor (AFL) leaders, including Samuel Gompers, William Green, and Matthew Woll, making it "the unofficial educational arm" of the AFL. The AFL slowly built a majority on the WEB board of directors. In 1929, the AFL assumed "complete financial and administrative control." The AFL then asserted a conservative influence on the organization's activities, which included withdrawing support from left-wing and progressive labor colleges and other training organizations as well as supporting only those curricula which supported the AFL's apolitical agenda and craft unionism.

The WEB's first convention was held at the New School for Social Research in New York City.

In the Report of Proceedings First National Conference on Workers Education in the United States, the Board adopted the following resolutions:

1. Including the school curriculum the teaching of an unemasculated industrial history embracing an accurate account of the organization of the workers and of the results thereof, the teaching of the principles underlying industrial activities and relations, and a summary of legislation, state and federal, affecting industry.
2. The making of a careful and comprehensive survey and the preparation and distribution of a bibliography of all books, pamphlets and addresses dealing with industrial and economic problems, which are founded on accurate information, sound principles and which will prove helpful in removing the false conception of existing theories of industrial, political and social economy.
3. Encouraging all schools, colleges, universities, libraries, trade union centers, and all institutes of learning to secure copies of the books, pamphlets and addresses recommended for use by those interested in securing accurate and reliable information regarding industrial problems.
4. Encouraging textbook writers and publishers to avail themselves of the library and the records of the A. F. of L. upon all subjects dealing with the industrial development and progress, as well as the movement of the wage-earners, in the preparation of textbooks on industrial problems and movements.
5. The preparation of a textbook by the A. F. of L. to supplement the existing works of President Gompers and other recognized authorities of the American trade union movement, to be prepared by a competent trade unionist under the direction of the executive officers of the A. F. of L. in cooperation with a special committee for this purpose.
6. Encouraging and assisting affiliated international trade unions in the preparing of textbooks for their membership, dealing with economic laws, the development of their trade and the solving of trade problems, as well as the influence of their trade union activities upon the development of industrial relations.

In the same report, the Constitution of the organization is stated. Under its Constitution, WEB affirmed that its purpose is to, "collect and to disseminate information relative to efforts at education on any part of organized labor; to coordinate and assist in every possible manner the educational work now carried on by the organized workers; and to stimulate the creation of additional enterprises in labor education throughout the United States."

In 1951, WEB formally integrated into the AFL (and later, after the merger with the Congress of Industrial Organizations, the AFL–CIO) as its Education Department.

In 2003, the AFL-CIO transferred the duties and programs of the Education Department to the George Meany Center-National Labor College.

== Officers ==
1921:

- Officers: James H. Maurer Chairman; Spencer Miller Jr., Secretary-Treasurer
- Executive Committee: John Brophy, Fannia M. Cohn, Henry Wadsworth Longfellow Dana, W. F. Kehoe, Frieda S. Miller, H. A. Russell, J.B. Salutsky (J. B. S. Hardman)
- Advisory Committee: Mary Anderson, Robert Bruere, J.M. Budish, JR Copenhaver, James A. Duncan, Alexander Fichandler, John Fitzpatrick, Felix Frankfurter, Mabel Gillespie, Arthur Gleason, Walton H. Hamilton, Alexander Howat, Arthur M. Huddle, Thomas Kennedy, Susan M. Kingsbury, W. Jett Lauck, PJ McGrath, Bertha H. Mailly, Broadus Mitchell, Agnes Nestor, Julia S. O'Connor, Roscoe Pound, Joseph Schlossberg, Rose Schneiderman, Charles B. Stillman, John H. Walker

== Institutional members ==
In 1922, WEB's second national convention listed the following as "trade union colleges, study classes, and workers' educational enterprises":

California:

Sacramento Labor College,
San Francisco Labor College
Labor Temple (Los Angeles)
People's Institute (San Francisco)
Workers Educational League (Oakland)

Colorado: Denver Labor College
Connecticut: Labor Education Alliance (Hartford)
District of Columbia:

Washington Trade Union College
Progressive Education Association

Illinois:

Palatine Cooperative Society (Chicago)
Chicago Trade Union College
Amalgamated Labor Classes
Training School for Women Workers (Chicago)

Kansas: People's College (Fort Scott)
Maryland: Baltimore Labor College
Massachusetts:

Boston Trade Union College
Springfield Workers' Classes
Amherst Classes for Workers: Holyoke Workers' Classes
Amherst Classes for Workers: Unity Center (ILGWU)
Workingmen's Educational Institute

Labor Lyceum Association (Chelsea)
Malden Labor Lyceum (Malden)

Michigan: Workers Educational
Minnesota:

St. Paul Labor College
Minneapolis Workers' College
Work Peoples College (Duluth)
Work Peoples College (Smithville)

Missouri:

Kansas City Workers College
St. Louis Workers College

New Jersey:

Passaic Trade Union College
International Labor Temple Association (Paterson)
Workers' Study Class (Newark)

Nebraska: Labor Temple School (Omaha)
New York:

Amalgamated Workers' Classes (Rochester)
Rochester Labor College
Amalgamated Workers' Classes (New York City)
Active Workers' School ACW (New York City)
Workers' University (ILGWU) (New York City)
Waist Makers' Unity Center (New York City)
Harlem Unity Center (The Bronx)
Brownsville Unity Center
Second Bronx Unity Center
Lower Bronx Unity Center
Workers' Class (Fancy Leather Goods Workers) (New York City)
Labor Temple School (New York City)
Rand School of Social Science (New York City)
Brookwood Workers' College (Brookwood Labor College) (Katonah)
Syracuse Labor School
Poughkeepsie Labor Class
Workers' Study Class (Mt. Vernon)

Ohio:

Workers' Study Class (ILGWU) (Cleveland)
American Academy of Christian (Cincinnati)
Youngstown Study

Oregon: Portland Trade Union College
Pennsylvania:

Pittsburg Trade Union College
Bryn Mawr Summer School
Erie Labor School
Harrisburg Labor School
Bethlehem Labor School
Reading Labor School
Lancaster Labor School
Pottsville Labor School
Pen Argyl Labor School
Philadelphia Trade Union College
Workers' Study Class (ILGWU)

Washington:

Seattle Workers' College
Spokane Workers' College
Tacoma Labor College

Wisconsin: Milwaukee Workers' College
Wyoming: Trade Union College (Sheridan)
