= James J. Creamer =

American politician

James J. Creamer (1861 – August 25, 1918) was an American labor unionist and politician.

Born in Richmond, Virginia, Creamer completed an apprenticeship as a machinist. In 1884, he joined the Knights of Labor, and he later served as secretary of his local. In 1888, he was a founding member of what soon became the International Association of Machinists (IAM). He was elected as the union's grand foreman in 1889, presenting the union with a gavel made of wood from the Arlington National Cemetery.

In 1890, Creamer succeeded as grand master machinist, leader of the IAM. He opposed the appointment of full-time paid organizers, instead appointing part-time district organizers, who spent most of their time working in the trade. He served as leader until 1892, when he stood down, due to the low pay and extensive travel. In 1893, James O'Connell became grand master machinist. He was a close friend of Creamer's, who had previously lodged at Creamer's house. Creamer became editor of the Machinists' Monthly Journal, serving until 1895, when he became a gas inspector for Richmond.

Creamer remained active in the union movement, and in 1908, represented the American Federation of Labor at the British Trades Union Congress. He was a supporter of the Democratic Party, and in 1911, he was elected to represent Richmond in the Virginia House of Delegates, with the unanimous backing of the city's Central Trades Council. He served a single term, and died in 1918.

Trade union offices
Preceded by Thomas W. Talbot	Grand Master Machinist of the International Association of Machinists; 1890–1892	Succeeded by John O'Day
Preceded by John T. Dempsey; William E. Klapetzky	American Federation of Labor delegate to the Trades Union Congress; 1908; With: Andrew Furuseth	Succeeded by Samuel Gompers; John P. Frey; Bernard A. Larger
