= Workers' education =

Workers' education may refer to:

- Workers' Educational Association
- Workers' Education Bureau of America
