= Boot and Shoe Workers' Union =

North American trade union

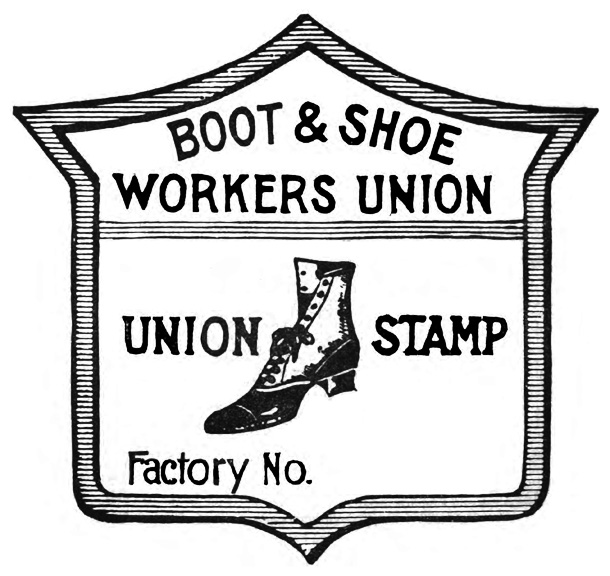
- Union label of the Boot and Shoe Workers' Union
- Abbreviation: BSWU
- Merged into: Retail Clerks International Union
- Formation: 1895
- Dissolved: 1977
- Merger of: Boot and Shoe Workers International Union; Lasters' Protective Union of America; National Trade Assembly 216 of the Knights of Labor
- Type: Trade union
- Locations: Canada; United States
- Members: 29,000 (1977)
- Presidents: John F. Tobin; Collis Lovely; John J. Mara; John E. Mara
- Secessions: Shoe Workers' Protective Union
- Affiliations: AFL-CIO; Canadian Labour Congress

The Boot and Shoe Workers' Union (BSWU) was a trade union of workers in the footwear manufacturing industry in the United States and Canada. It was established in 1895 by the merger of three older unions. It was affiliated with the American Federation of Labor. In 1977 it merged into the Retail Clerks International Union, part of the AFL-CIO.

== History ==
=== Forerunners ===
On February 23, 1889, Henry J. Skeffington led a dissident faction of shoemakers who were part of National Trade Assembly 216 of the Knights of Labor, to split off to establish a new organization called the Boot and Shoe Workers International Union. Skeffington would serve as its National Secretary-Treasurer in 1889, and as Secretary and Treasurer from 1890 to 1894. This new union affiliated almost immediately with the American Federation of Labor (AF of L), a federative organization which united many specialized craft unions into a single entity.

In an effort to avoid jurisdictional disputes with another member of the AF of L, the Lasters' Protective Union of America, the two shoe workers' unions joined forces in Boston, Massachusetts, in 1895, establishing the Boot and Shoe Workers' Union (BSWU).

The BSWU included members from both the United States and Canada, including French-speaking workers from the Canadian shoe producing center of Montreal, Quebec. In an effort to retain ties with these workers, the BSWU published a section in each issue of its monthly journal in the French language.

According to the preamble of an early BSWU constitution, the union was to be organized for the following purposes:

To thoroughly organize our craft; to regulate wages and conditions of employment; to establish uniform wages for the same class of work, regardless of sex; to control apprentices; to reduce the hours of labor; to abolish convict and contract labor; to abolish child labor, prohibiting the employment of children under the age of sixteen; to promote the use of our "Union Stamp" as the sole and only guarantee of "Union Made" footwear; to support the Union Labels of all other bona fide trade unions, and to assist them in every other way to the full extent of our power.

The Boot and Shoe Workers' Union was regarded as a "radical" union in its earliest days, with John F. Tobin, the General President of the BSWU from its foundation until his death in 1919, regarded as a socialist and an opponent of conservative AF of L President Samuel Gompers.

=== Development ===
In 1925 the 16th convention of the BSWU raised per capita dues from 25 cents to 35 cents per week. The organization also doubled its initiation fee to $2.00 at that time.

=== Official organ ===
The official organ of the Boot and Shoe Workers' Union was a monthly magazine called The Shoe Workers' Journal. The periodical was launched in Boston on January 15, 1900, as the Union Boot and Shoe Worker, changing its name to the more familiar Shoe Workers' Journal effective with the July 1902 issue.

The magazine was irregularly produced, twice suspending publication for protracted periods during the Great Depression – from the start of 1934 through March 1935 and again from July 1937 through the end of 1940. The publication continued into the decade of the 1970s.

=== Merger ===
The Boot and Shoe Workers' Union merged into the Retail Clerks International Union in 1977.

== Leadership ==
=== Presidents ===
1889: John F. Tobin
1919: Collis Lovely
1929: John J. Mara
1960: John E. Mara

=== Secretary-Treasurers ===
1889: Henry J. Skeffington
1895: Horace M. Eaton
1902: Charles L. Baine
1931: Post merged with president

== Publications ==
- Report of Proceedings of Fourth Convention of Boot and Shoe Workers' Union: Held in New Osborne House, Rochester, NY, June 13 to 19th, inclusive, 1899. Lynn, MA: J.F. McCarty & Co., 1899.
- "Proceedings of the Ninth Convention of the Boot and Shoe Workers' Union, Syracuse, NY, June 21-28, 1909," in The Shoe Workers' Journal, vol. 10, no. 7 (July 1909), pp. 1–136.
- The Shoe Workers' Journal.
  - Vol. 7 (1906) | Vol. 17 & 18 (1916-1917)
- Boot and Shoe Workers Union, Edgemakers and Heelers Local (Brockton, Mass.) records, 1895-1930
