= John J. Manning (unionist) =

American labor unionist

John J. Manning (1868 – July 17, 1934) was an American labor unionist.

Born in Troy, New York, Manning worked sewing shirts in a sweatshop in New York City, where he joined the Shirt Ironers' Union. In 1900, he helped merge this into the new Shirt, Waist, and Laundry Workers' International Union. He was president of the new union until 1902, then from 1904 was its Eastern organizer, and in 1905 became its secretary-treasurer. In 1909, shirt workers were transferred to the United Garment Workers of America, and Manning became an organizer for that union, and also associate editor of its journal, the Garment Worker.

In 1917, Manning moved to become secretary-treasurer of the Union Label Department of the American Federation of Labor, serving until 1931, and again from 1933 until his death, in 1934.

Trade union offices
Preceded by Thomas F. Tracy	Secretary-Treasurer of the Union Label Department; 1917–1931	Succeeded by George W. Perkins
Preceded by George W. Perkins	Secretary-Treasurer of the Union Label Department; 1933–1934	Succeeded by Ira M. Ornburn
Preceded by William J. Rooney; W. P. Carney	American Federation of Labor delegate to the Trades Union Congress; 1930; With: Thomas E. Maloy	Succeeded by Joseph P. Ryan; Joseph V. Moreschi
