= Jacob Fischer (unionist) =

American labor union leader (1871–1936)

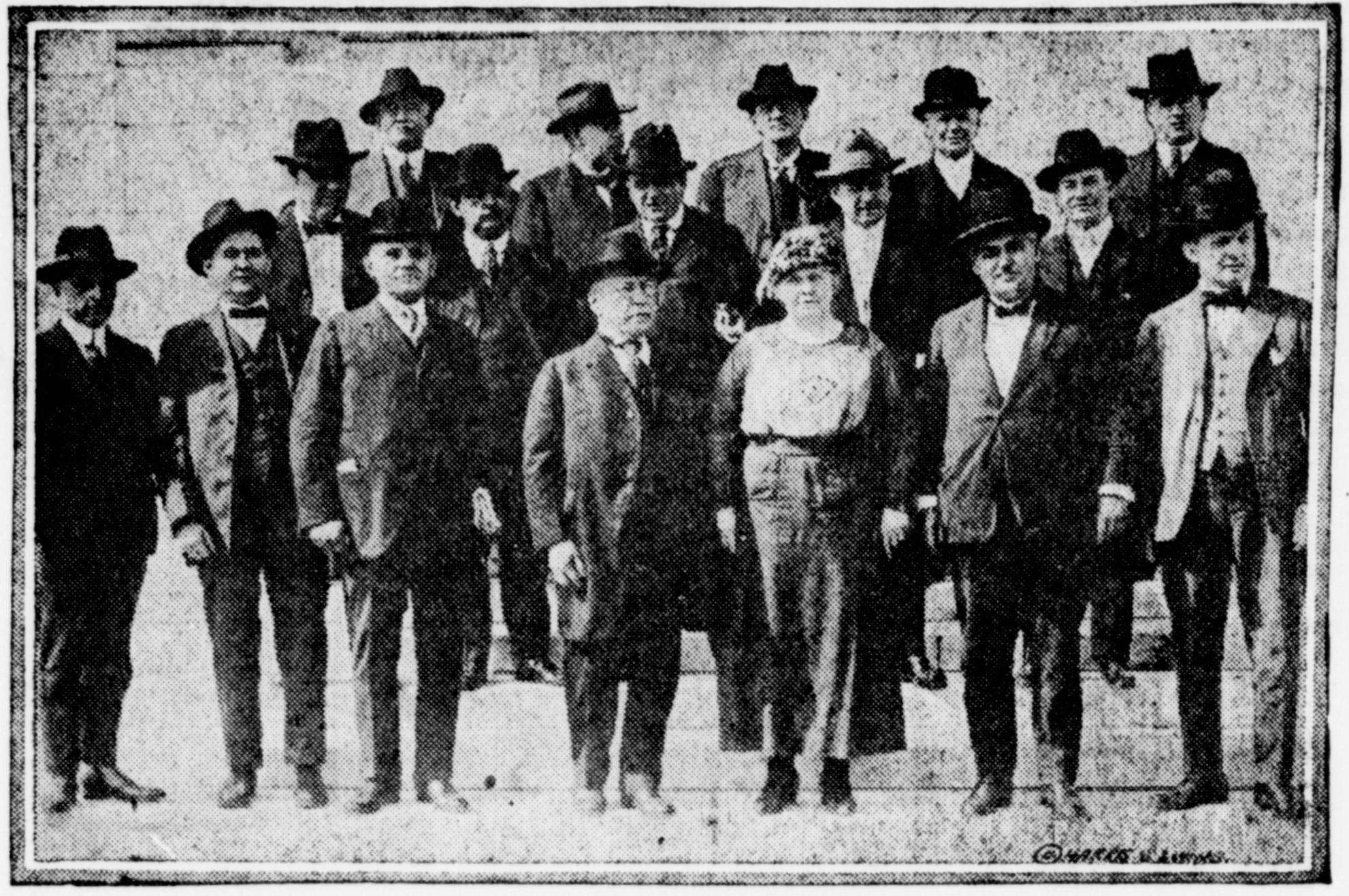
Fischer (second row, second from left) at the National Industrial Conference in Washington, D.C., 1919

Jacob Fischer (April 11, 1871 – August 25, 1936) was an American labor union leader.

Born in Osborn, Ohio, Fischer moved to Indianapolis when he was 16. There, he became a baker, then a printer, before finally training as a barber. He joined the Journeymen Barbers' International Union of America. In 1894, he was elected as vice-president of the union, then as president in 1898. He became an organizer for the union in 1902, then in 1904, was elected as secretary-treasurer.

From 1918, Fischer served as a vice-president of the American Federation of Labor, and he also became a vice-president of the Union Label Department. He retired in 1929, and died seven years later.

Trade union offices
Preceded by William E. Klapetzky	Secretary-Treasurer of the Journeymen Barbers' International Union; 1904–1929	Succeeded by Herman C. Wenzel
Preceded by Thomas A. Rickert	Sixth Vice-President of the American Federation of Labor; 1923–1924	Succeeded by Matthew Woll
Preceded by Thomas A. Rickert	Fifth Vice-President of the American Federation of Labor; 1924–1926	Succeeded by Matthew Woll
Preceded by Thomas A. Rickert	Fourth Vice-President of the American Federation of Labor; 1926–1928	Succeeded by Matthew Woll
Preceded by Thomas A. Rickert	Third Vice-President of the American Federation of Labor; 1928–1929	Succeeded by Matthew Woll
