= John H. Walker =

American labor unionist and politician (1872–1955)

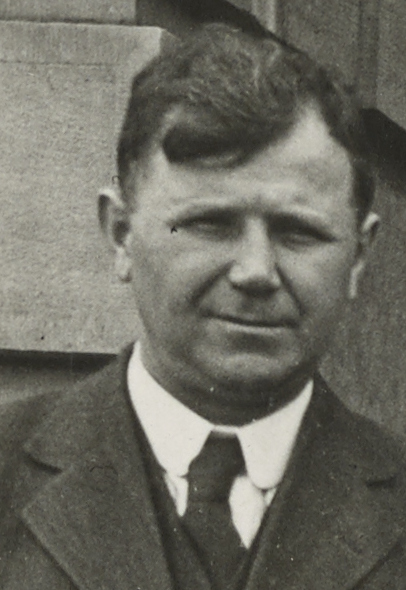
- Walker in 1918
- Born: John Hunter Walker; April 27, 1872; Binniehill, Scotland
- Died: August 27, 1955 (aged 83)
- Occupations: Politician; labor organizer

John Hunter Walker (April 27, 1872 – August 27, 1955) was a Scottish-born American labor unionist and politician.

Born in Binniehill, in Scotland, Walker emigrated to the United States with his family in 1881. They settled in Braidwood, Illinois, and the same year, Walker began working at a colliery in Coal City, Illinois. Two years later, he joined the Knights of Labor, aged just 11.

Walker later returned to Scotland, but soon came back to the United States. He joined the United Mine Workers of America and soon became a full-time organizer for the union, covering West Virginia. In that role, he met Mother Jones, and quickly became her closest associate in the union.

Walker later settled in Danville, Illinois, and in 1905, he was elected to the executive board of the union's District 12. He served as president of the district, from 1906 to 1909, and from 1910 to 1913. He was a supporter of the Socialist Party of America, and in 1906 he ran unsuccessfully for the United States House of Representatives.

In 1913, Walker was elected as president of the Illinois State Federation of Labor, serving until 1919, and again from 1920 to 1930. In 1915, he was a founder of the Illinois State Cooperative Society, and he served as its president until 1921; and in 1917, he served on the President's Mediation Commission.

In 1916, Walker was expelled from the Socialist Party, and in 1919 he joined what soon became the Farmer–Labor Party. He was elected as national chairman of the party, and stood for it unsuccessfully in the 1920 Illinois gubernatorial election.

Walker stood unsuccessfully for the presidency of the United Mine Workers in 1916, and again in 1918. He was an opponent of John L. Lewis, United Mine Workers president from 1920. In 1929, he participated in a conference of Illinois coal miners opposed to Lewis, and Lewis used this pretext to persuade American Federation of Labor president William Green to remove him from his Illinois Federation post. In 1930, the opposition group formed the Reorganized United Mine Workers of America, with Walker as secretary-treasurer. However, within months, Walker won an election for the presidency of District 12, against the wishes of Lewis.

In 1932, Walker negotiated a new contract with coal mine owners, which led to pay cuts of up to 30%. Despite attracting severe criticism, he held on as president. He stood down in 1944, to campaign for the re-election of the governor of Illinois, Dwight H. Green. After Green won, Walker was appointed to the Illinois Commerce Commission. He retired in 1948, and died seven years later.

Trade union offices
Preceded by Herman C. Perry	President of the United Mine Workers of America District No. 12; 1906–1909	Succeeded by Duncan McDonald
Preceded by Duncan McDonald	President of the United Mine Workers of America District No. 12; 1910–1913	Succeeded by Frank Farrington
Preceded by Edwin R. Wright	President of the Illinois Federation of Labor; 1913–1919	Succeeded by Duncan McDonald
Preceded by Duncan McDonald	President of the Illinois Federation of Labor; 1920–1930	Succeeded by Reuben G. Soderstrom
Preceded by Harry Fishwick	President of the United Mine Workers of America District No. 12; 1931–1944	Succeeded by Hugh White
Preceded by Daniel J. Tobin; W. B. Macfarlane	American Federation of Labor delegate to the Trades Union Congress; 1912; With: George L. Berry	Succeeded by Charles L. Baine; Louis Kemper
