= UGWA =

UGWA may refer to:

- United Garment Workers of America, a defunct United States labor union
- Upper Guyandotte Watershed Association, an environmental not for profit corporation
