= Thomas F. Tracy =

American labor unionist (1861–1916)

Thomas Francis Tracy (April 22, 1861 – November 4, 1916) was an American labor unionist.

Born in Massachusetts, Tracy became a cigar maker, working in Boston. A supporter of the Republican Party, he served on Boston Common Council in 1888.

Tracy joined the Cigar Makers' International Union, representing it on the Boston Central Labor Union, of which he was president in 1893/94, and again in 1897. He also served on the legislative committee of the Massachusetts State Federation of Labor.

In 1896, Tracy was elected as a vice-president of the cigar makers. In 1898, he began working full-time for the American Federation of Labor (AFL) as an organizer, and in 1899, he represented the AFL at the British Trades Union Congress. From 1900 to 1903, and again from 1906 to 1909, he served on the AFL's legislative committee. In 1909, he became the founding secretary of the AFL's Union Label Department. He died in 1916, still in office.

Trade union offices
Preceded by James Duncan; Henry Demarest Lloyd	American Federation of Labor delegate to the Trades Union Congress; 1899; With: James O'Connell	Succeeded by J. M. Hunter; Sidney J. Kent
Preceded by Department created	Secretary-Treasurer of the Union Label Department; 1909–1916	Succeeded by John J. Manning
