= International Woodworkers of America, Local 2-69 v Consolidated-Bathurst Packaging Ltd =

- Supreme Court of Canada

Hearing: April 26, 1989 Judgment: March 15, 1990
- Full case name: Consolidated‑Bathurst Packaging Limited v International Woodworkers of America, Local 2‑69 and The Ontario Labour Relations Board
- Citations: [1990] 1 SCR 282, 73 OR (2d) 676, 42 Admin LR 1, 38 OAC 321, 1990 CanLII 132 (SCC)
- Docket No.: 20114
- Prior history: Appeal from the Ontario Court of Appeal
- Ruling: Appeal Dismissed

Holding
- Full Board meetings of an administrative tribunal do not violate the principles of natural justice as long as they do not influence decision-makers through systemic pressure.

Court membership
- Chief Justice: Brian Dickson; Puisne Justices: Antonio Lamer, Bertha Wilson, Gérard La Forest, Claire L'Heureux-Dubé, John Sopinka, Charles Gonthier, Peter Cory, Beverley McLachlin

Reasons given
- Majority: Gonthier J., joined by Wilson, La Forest, L'Heureux-Dubé, and McLachlin JJ.
- Dissent: Sopinka J., joined by Lamer J.
- Dickson C.J.C. and Cory J. took no part in the consideration or decision of the case.

Laws applied
- Labour Relations Act, RSO 1980, c 228

International Woodworkers of America, Local 2-69 v Consolidated-Bathurst Packaging Ltd, [1990] 1 SCR 282 is a leading Canadian administrative law case on the issue of procedural fairness and bias. The Supreme Court of Canada held that full board meetings of the Ontario Labour Relations Board to discuss matters of policy in relation to a case did not violate the principles of natural justice.

== Background ==
This action arose from a labour dispute resulting from the closure of a corrugated container plant in Hamilton operated by Consolidated-Bathurst Packaging Ltd. on April 26, 1983. Prior to this closure, the union and the management had been engaged in collective bargaining, which resulted in an agreement dated April 22, 1983. The union was never informed of management's decision to close the plant.

The International Woodworkers of America filed an application with the Ontario Labour Relations Board for relief, arguing that the management had not bargained in good faith as they did not disclose information relevant to the negotiations during the process.

The Board had previously decided a similar issue in United Electrical, Radio & Machine Workers of America, Local 504 v. Westinghouse Canada Ltd., and held that there was a duty to disclose information relating to plans "which, if implemented during the term of the collective agreement, would have a significant impact on the economic lives of bargaining unit employees".

Both the union and the employer argued that the Westinghouse test should be modified. Management argued that speculative information did not need to be disclosed (and, on the facts of the case, the decision regarding the plant closure could not be definitively established). The union argued that there is a duty to disclose if the employer was "seriously considering an action which if carried out will have a serious impact on employees."

After a three-member panel heard the arguments, they brought up the policy issue regarding the Westinghouse test to a "full Board meeting" of all members of the Ontario Labour Relations Board.

According to the Board, the purpose of the full Board meeting was to discuss issues of policy that affect future cases. It had been the custom of the Board to hold such meetings in order to discuss decisions in order to create certainty and uniformity in their decisions, although the full Board meeting did not have power to bind individual panels in their decisions.

Following this meeting, the panel returned a ruling in favour of the union, holding that the employers had bargained in bad faith, upholding the Westinghouse test.

The employer applied for re-consideration of the decision, arguing that the full Board meeting was illegal because it violated the audi alteram partem rule of natural justice, that decisions could not be made unless the parties were heard. In this case, although the three members who heard the case were part of the full Board meeting, the employers argued that the full Board meeting did not have the opportunity to hear the arguments first hand and were not entitled to make a decision on their case.

The Board upheld its decision, and the case was eventually appealed to the Supreme Court of Canada on the issue of whether the rules of natural justice allow a full Board meeting to take place, given the policy considerations relevant to the Board.

== Opinion of the Court ==
A majority of the Court held that the full Board meetings were justified in order for individual members of the Board to benefit from the collective experience of all its members, and to ensure uniformity of decisions rendered by the Board.

The Court considered "whether the disadvantages involved in this practice are sufficiently important to warrant a holding that it constitutes a breach of the rules of natural justice, or whether full Board meetings are consistent with these rules, provided that certain safeguards be observed."

In weighing these considerations, the Court recognized the inherent problems associated with the full Board meetings, which compromised the independence of panels to decide individual cases:

It is obvious that no outside interference may be used to compel or pressure a decision maker to participate in discussions on policy issues raised by a case on which he must render a decision. It also goes without saying that a formalized consultation process could not be used to force or induce decision makers to adopt positions with which they do not agree. Nevertheless, discussions with colleagues do not constitute, in and of themselves, infringements on the panel members' capacity to decide the issues at stake independently. A discussion does not prevent a decision maker from adjudicating in accordance with his own conscience and opinions nor does it constitute an obstacle to this freedom. Whatever discussion may take place, the ultimate decision will be that of the decision maker for which he assumes full responsibility.

Nonetheless, the Court found that since the full Board meetings were limited to discussions of policy and not factual findings, they were satisfied that the meetings did not influence or pressure the individual three-member panels deciding each case.

Gonthier J. summarized the court's opinion:

The advantages of an institutionalized consultation process are obvious and I cannot agree with the proposition that this practice necessarily conflicts with the rules of natural justice. The rules of natural justice must have the flexibility required to take into account the institutional pressures faced by modern administrative tribunals as well as the risks inherent in such a practice. ...

The consultation process adopted by the Board formally recognizes the disadvantages inherent in full board meetings, namely that the judicial independence of the panel members may be fettered by such a practice and that the parties do not have the opportunity to respond to all the arguments raised at the meeting. The safeguards attached to this consultation process are, in my opinion, sufficient to allay any fear of violations of the rules of natural justice provided as well that the parties be advised of any new evidence or grounds and given an opportunity to respond. The balance so achieved between the rights of the parties and the institutional pressures the Board faces are consistent with the nature and purpose of the rules of natural justice.

== Aftermath ==
The Supreme Court of Canada re-affirmed its decision in Tremblay v. Quebec (Commission des affaires sociales) and Ellis-Don Ltd. v. Ontario (Labour Relations Board). They further clarified that meetings involving members not on the panel hearing the case could constitute inappropriate influence if the applicant could show that there was systemic pressure acting on the panels.
