= Barbers, Beauticians and Allied Industries International Association =

North American trade union

- Abbreviation: BBAIIA
- Merged into: United Food and Commercial Workers
- Formation: 1887
- Dissolved: 1980
- Type: Trade union
- Headquarters: Indianapolis, Indiana, US
- Locations: Canada; United States
- Affiliations: AFL–CIO; Canadian Labour Congress
- Formerly called: Journeymen Barbers' International Union of America (1887–1941); Journeymen Barbers', Hairdressers' and Cosmetologists' International Union of America (1941–?)

The Barbers, Beauticians and Allied Industries International Association (BBAIIA) was a labor union representing workers in the personal grooming industry in the United States and Canada.

The union was founded on December 5, 1887, as the Journeymen Barbers' International Union of America. Its original locals had previously formed part of the Knights of Labor. In 1888, it was charted by the American Federation of Labor. In 1924, the union began admitting women, but its constitution explicitly barred people of East Asian ethnicity from joining. By 1925, it had 50,282 members and had headquarters in Indianapolis.

In 1941, the union renamed itself as the Journeymen Barbers', Hairdressers' and Cosmetologists' International Union of America. It joined the new AFL-CIO in 1955, and was joined by the Barbers' and Beauty Culturists' Union of America in 1956. By 1957 it had 72,000 members, but this fell to 40,000 in 1980. That year, it merged into the United Food and Commercial Workers.

== Leadership ==
=== Presidents ===
1887: Edward Finkelstone
1888: H. G. Hoch
1889: William Hain
1890: John C. Meyers
1894:
1898: Jacob Fischer
1901: Frank X. Noschang
1922: James C. Shanessy
1936: William C. Birthright
1963: Joseph N. De Paola
1971: Richard A. Plumb

=== Secretary-Treasurers ===
1889: Post combined with president
1893: William E. Klapetzky
1904: Jacob Fischer
1929: Herman C. Wenzel
1930: William C. Birthright
1963: E. M. Sanders
1970s: Roy Emerson
