= Newfoundland Loggers' Strike =

- Location: Newfoundland, Canada
- Caused by: labor dispute
- Result: IWA de facto barred from Newfoundland

Parties
International Woodworkers of America (IWA)	Anglo-Newfoundland Development Co. Newfoundland Loggers' Association (NLA)

Casualties
- Death: 1 police officer

The Newfoundland Loggers' Strike was a labor strike in 1958. The strike, led by the International Woodworkers of America (IWA), concerned loggers who campaigned for improved labor and living conditions in logging camps. The strike was unsuccessful and resulted in the IWA being de facto expelled from Newfoundland. The strike has been described as the "most bitter labour dispute in Newfoundland's history."

The strike culminated in the Badger Riot on March 10, 1959. In which some 250 loggers clashed with 66 police officers of the Newfoundland Constabulary and Royal Canadian Mounted Police. The violent clash resulted in the death of a police officer.

== History ==
A major exporter of lumber and lumber products, Newfoundland was a center for the Canadian lumber industry - by the 1950s, the industry was employing thousands of Newfoundlanders. One of the largest lumber companies on Newfoundland was the Anglo-Newfoundland Development Co. (AND Co.), which employed hundreds of lumberjacks. The local labor union, the Newfoundland Loggers' Association (NLA), was considered by some to be too weak to deal with the company.

In 1956, the International Woodworkers of America (IWA) began to operate on Newfoundland, quickly challenging the NLA for control over the organized labor movement on the island. To lower public support for the NLA, the IWA began to poach membership from the NLA and proclaim that the latter was an overly weak union, resulting in friction between the two competing unions. Tensions continued to mount, and in 1958 the IWA organized a large strike at an AND Co. facility in Grand Falls-Windsor, advocating for higher wages and better working conditions.

When the strike began on 31 December 1958, hundreds of workers joined the strike. Many workers supported the IWA but a number of lumberjacks remained in support of the NLA, which strongly opposed the strike, believing the IWA to be too radical. The IWA retaliated by stepping up activities and publishing articles attacking the NLA and AND Co. in local newspapers.

The strike continued for several weeks without major incident, but by February public sentiment had turned against the strikers and the IWA. A notable opponent was Premier Joey Smallwood, who threatened to strip the IWA of its bargaining rights. Public opinion of the strike fell further when a policeman, Const. William Moss, was killed in a confrontation (known as the Badger riot) with strikers on March 10, 1959. Bolstered by rising anti-IWA sentiment in the public, the Newfoundland government passed a number of laws stripping the IWA of its right to bargain while also making labor unions liable for illegal acts committed on their behalf.

Soon after the conclusion of the strike, many former strikers joined the Newfoundland Brotherhood of Wood Workers, a government-sponsored union.

== See also ==
- List of incidents of civil unrest in Canada
