= Thomas A. Rickert =

American labor union leader (1876–1941)

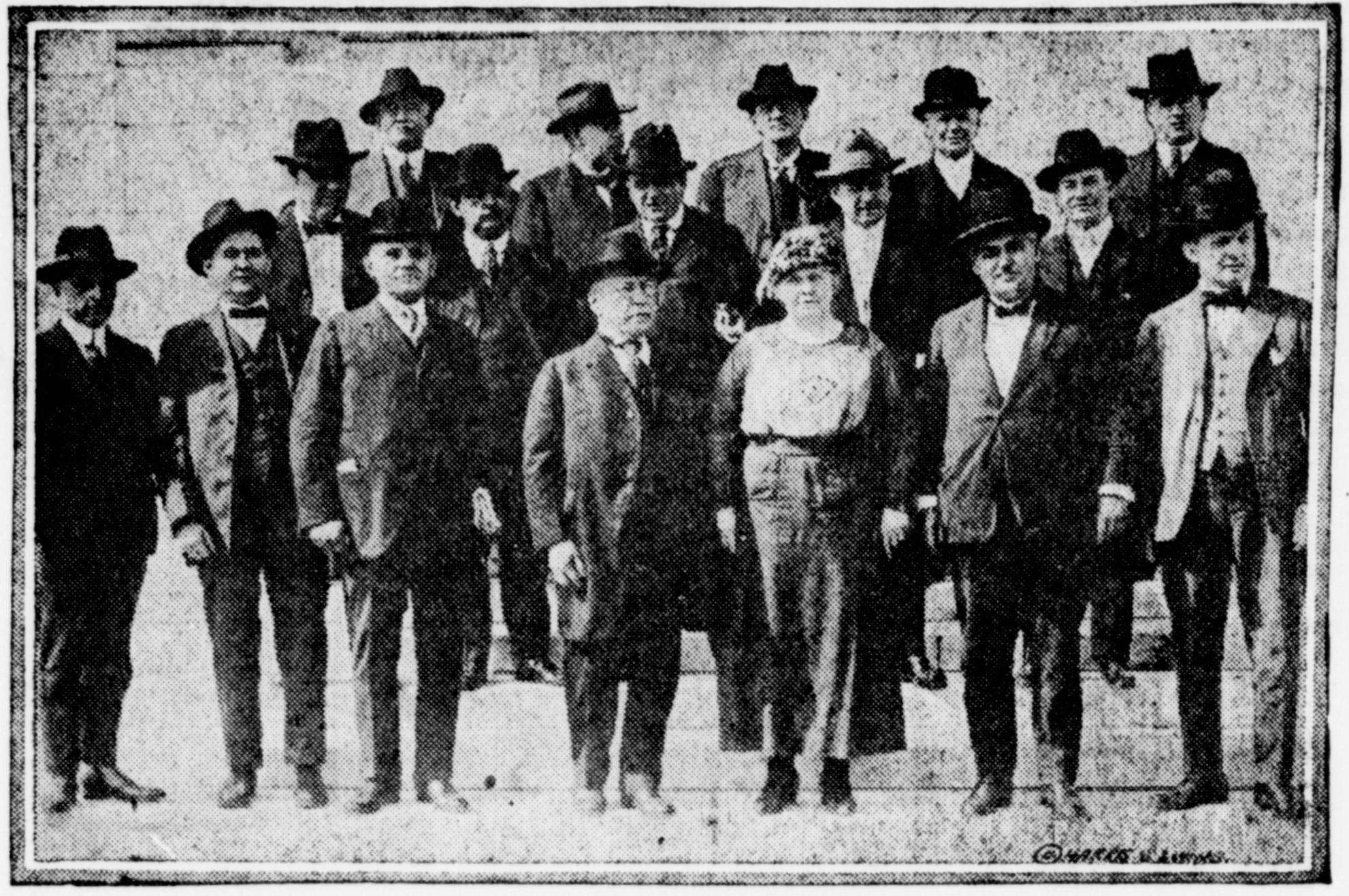
Rickert (front row, far right) at the National Industrial Conference in Washington, D.C., 1919

Thomas Alfred Rickert (April 24, 1876 – July 28, 1941) was an American labor union leader.

Born in Chicago, Rickert studied business, but then became a garment cutter, and joined the United Garment Workers of America. In 1904, he was elected as president of the union. As leader of the union, he was regarded as a strong negotiator, and a close associate of Samuel Gompers. However, two-thirds of the union's membership split away to form the Amalgamated Clothing Workers of America, alienated by Rickert's conservative approach.

He served on the National War Labor Board during World War I, and was a vice-president of the American Federation of Labor (AFL) from 1918. In 1934, he denounced the New Deal, arguing that the government was competing with private enterprise and thereby destroying jobs. In 1939, he became part of the AFL team negotiating with the rival Congress of Industrial Organizations, in which post he opposed any concessions to the other organization.

Trade union offices
Preceded by Bernard A. Larger	President of the United Garment Workers of America; 1904–1941	Succeeded by Joseph McGurdy
Preceded by William D. Mahon	Fifth Vice-President of the American Federation of Labor; 1923–1924	Succeeded by Jacob Fischer
Preceded by William Green	Fourth Vice-President of the American Federation of Labor; 1924–1926	Succeeded by Jacob Fischer
Preceded by William Green	Third Vice-President of the American Federation of Labor; 1926–1928	Succeeded by Jacob Fischer
Preceded by Frank Duffy	Second Vice-President of the American Federation of Labor; 1928–1941	Succeeded by Matthew Woll
