= George L. Berry =

American politician

- Berry in 1937

United States Senator from Tennessee
- In office May 6, 1937 – November 8, 1938
- Appointed by: Gordon Browning
- Preceded by: Nathan L. Bachman
- Succeeded by: Tom Stewart

President of the International Printing Pressmen and Assistants' Union of North America
- In office June 19, 1907 – December 4, 1948
- Preceded by: Martin P. Higgins
- Succeeded by: Julius de la Rosa

Personal details
- Born: September 12, 1882 Rogersville, Tennessee, U.S.
- Died: December 4, 1948 (aged 66) Pressmen's Home, Tennessee, U.S.
- Party: Democratic
- Spouse: Marie Gehres (m. 1907)

Military service
- Allegiance: United States
- Branch/service: United States Army
- Years of service: 1898; 1918–1919
- Rank: Private; Major
- Unit: Engineering Division
- Battles/wars: Spanish–American War; World War I

George Leonard Berry (September 12, 1882 – December 4, 1948) was an American labor leader, businessman and politician who served as president of the International Printing Pressmen and Assistants' Union of North America from 1907 to 1948 and as a Democratic United States Senator from Tennessee from 1937 to 1938.

Prior to his appointment as Senator, his closest brush with national electoral politics was narrowly coming in second for the vice presidential nomination at the Democratic National Convention in 1924, losing in the balloting to Nebraska governor Charles W. Bryan, the brother of William Jennings Bryan.

== Early life and career ==
Berry c. 1910s

Berry was born in the Lee Valley of Hawkins County, Tennessee, near Rogersville. Orphaned at the age of seven, he left home to work odd jobs and became a pressman's assistant in 1891. Aside from serving as a private in the Spanish–American War, he worked in this trade in several cities over the next 16 years. In 1899, while in St. Louis, Missouri, he joined the Press Assistants Union No. 43, and eight years later he was elected president of the international union on the slogan of "the closed shop and an immediate eight-hour day." At the time of his election, he was working in San Francisco as business agent of the Printing Pressmens' Union No. 24. Imprisoned ex-mayor Eugene Schmitz of the Union Labor Party tried to appoint him to the San Francisco Board of Supervisors, but his actions were not recognized and in any case Berry did not accept.

=== Pressmen's Home ===
During his tenure, the Pressmen's Union acquired and operated the former Hale Springs Resort, a mineral water resort in East Tennessee not far from Berry's boyhood home, as a sanatorium for its members suffering from "consumption" (tuberculosis), a common ailment of its members in that era, a residential trade school for its members to learn more advanced trades and increase their income, and as its international headquarters.

Berry had learned of its availability during a visit to his home area in conjunction with a search of the relatively nearby Asheville, North Carolina area, then renowned for its supposed curative properties with regard to respiratory disease. This facility became known as the Pressmen's Home. It was designed to be largely self-sufficient, and one point had a large agricultural operation, and, prior to the coming of the Tennessee Valley Authority, its own hydroelectric power plant.

== Political career ==
Berry speaks at the Labor's Non-Partisan League convention in Washington, D.C., March 8, 1937

During World War I, Berry served in the Engineering Division of the American Expeditionary Forces with the rank of major, leaving in 1918 and returning home the next year to resume active leadership of his union. He was frequently a delegate to many national and international labor meetings and congresses, and at the 1924 Democratic Convention, was almost nominated for Vice President. On May 6, 1937, he was appointed to the United States Senate by Tennessee Governor Gordon Browning to serve in the place of Nathan L. Bachman, who had died in office.

Turning the day-to-day operation of the union over to others, Berry moved to Washington, D.C., to attend to his senatorial duties. Berry opted to run in the 1938 Senate special election for the balance of the unexpired term, but was defeated in the Democratic primary by district attorney Tom Stewart, with the challenger winning 49% of the vote to Berry's 29%. Stewart had been seen as the more traditionally conservative candidate of the two, with Berry having been a prominent labor activist. Incumbent Governor Browning, who had appointed Berry to the Senate, was defeated in the nomination process by Prentice Cooper in the same year's primary cycle.

Some political historians feel that these defeats can be almost entirely attributed to the influence of the Memphis-based political machine of E. H. Crump, who supported both Stewart and Cooper. Berry's service as a senator ended on November 8, 1938, when the votes in the general election indicating Stewart's election were tallied, even though Stewart did not actually take the seat until early the next year.

== Death ==
Berry returned to day-to-day operation of the union and his interests, including agriculture, around the Pressmen's Home until his death. (The union continued to operate the facility for several years after Berry's death.) He was interred at Pressmen's Home but his body was later moved to McKinney Cemetery in nearby Rogersville.

Trade union offices
Preceded by Martin P. Higgins	President of the International Printing Pressmen and Assistants' Union of North America; 1907–1948	Succeeded by Julius de la Rosa
Preceded by Daniel J. Tobin; W. B. Macfarlane	American Federation of Labor delegate to the Trades Union Congress; 1912; With: John H. Walker	Succeeded by Charles L. Baine; Louis Kemper
Preceded by New position	Eleventh Vice-President of the American Federation of Labor; 1934–1935	Succeeded by John L. Lewis
U.S. Senate
Preceded by Nathan L. Bachman	U.S. senator (Class 2) from Tennessee; 1937–1938; Served alongside: Kenneth D. McKellar	Succeeded by Tom Stewart
