= Louis Kemper =

American Labor Unionist

Louis Kemper (1870 – October 9, 1914) was an American labor unionist.

Born in Hudson, New York, Kemper completed an apprenticeship as a brewer in New York City. He joined the National Union of the United Brewery Workmen of the United States, and in about 1899 moved to Union Hill, New Jersey (later merged to form Union City), to work as an organizer for the union, becoming secretary of the union local he founded there. He married on October 10, 1889.

In 1900, Kemper suffered a serious accident at work; several surgeries were necessary to save his life, and he spent 18 months in recovery. He spent his time recovering studying social and political economy.

In 1901, Kemper was elected as corresponding and financial secretary of the Brewery Workmen, moving to Cincinnati. The role was split in 1904, with Kemper continuing as the corresponding secretary of the union. In 1912, he served as the American Federation of Labor's delegate to the British Trades Union Congress.

In 1914, Kemper was a founder of the Home Rule Amendment League and the Labor Home Rule League, organizations which opposed Prohibition. He caught pneumonia and died in October 1914, at age 44, in Cincinnati.

Trade union offices
Preceded by George L. Berry; John H. Walker	American Federation of Labor delegate to the Trades Union Congress; 1913; With: Charles L. Baine	Succeeded by William D. Mahon; Matthew Woll
