= Charles L. Baine =

Canadian-born American labor union leader

Charles Lucius Baine (January 27, 1870 – March 1, 1962) was a Canadian-born American labor union leader.

Born in Guelph, Ontario, Baine emigrated to the United States, settling in Chicago, where he worked as a shoemaker. He joined the Boot and Shoe Workers' Union, and in 1902 was elected as its secretary-treasurer.

In 1913, Baine was the American Federation of Labor's (AFL) delegate to the British Trades Union Congress (TUC). He spoke at the TUC congress, where he advised that it avoid political activity. In 1918, he accompanied AFL leader Samuel Gompers on another trip to visit the labor movement in Britain.

Baine held his secretary-treasurer post until his retirement in 1931. He lived until 1962.

Trade union offices
| Preceded by Horace M. Eaton | Secretary-Treasurer of the Boot and Shoe Workers' Union; 1902–1931 | Succeeded by John J. Mara |
| Preceded by George L. Berry; John H. Walker | American Federation of Labor delegate to the Trades Union Congress; 1913; With: Louis Kemper | Succeeded by William D. Mahon; Matthew Woll |
