= Barbers' and Beauty Culturists' Union of America =

The Barbers' and Beauty Culturists' Union of America (BBC) was a labor union representing workers in the beauty industry in the United States.

The union was established in 1939, as a split from the Journeymen Barbers' International Union of America. In November, it was chartered by the Congress of Industrial Organizations. By 1953, it had 5,000 members. It transferred to the new AFL-CIO in 1955, and the following year, it merged back into the Journeymen Barbers.
