= William E. Klapetzky =

American labor union leader

William E. Klapetzky (July 26, 1867 – October 18, 1916) was an American labor union leader.

Born in Syracuse, New York, Klapetzky undertook an apprenticeship as a barber at an early age. He joined the Journeymen Barbers' International Union of America in 1889, and was elected as its vice-president in 1891. Two years later, he was elected as general secretary of the union. In this role, he proposed a new financial system for the union, and set out a plan to overcome what he saw as the factors limiting the union's success. The proved popular, and in 1894, the role of treasurer was added to his post. Under his leadership, the union's membership grew substantially. In the post, he drafted a bill proposing the licensing of barbers, and women were admitted to the union for the first time.

In 1904, Klapetzky stood down as secretary-treasurer due to poor health, and was given an honorary life membership. In 1905, he became the editor of the union's journal, Journeyman Barber. By 1914, his health had declined further, and he fully retired, dying two years later.

Trade union offices
Preceded by New position	Secretary-Treasurer of the Journeymen Barbers' International Union; 1893–1904	Succeeded by Jacob Fischer
Preceded by Frank Keyes Foster; James Wilson	American Federation of Labor delegate to the Trades Union Congress; 1907; With: John T. Dempsey	Succeeded by Andrew Furuseth; James J. Creamer
