= Bernard A. Larger =

Bernard A. Larger (1865 – June 23, 1928) was an American labor union leader.

Born in Drinkwater, Massachusetts, Larger moved to Cincinnati in 1885, where he worked as a garment cutter. He joined the United Garment Workers of America, and was elected as its president in 1897, serving for a single year. He was re-elected in 1900, serving until 1904, when he moved to become the union's general secretary.

Larger had a strong relationship with Samuel Gompers, leader of the American Federation of Labor, and represented the federation at several overseas conferences.

Trade union offices
Preceded by Charles Reichers	President of the United Garment Workers of America; 1897–1898	Succeeded by ?
Preceded by ?	President of the United Garment Workers of America; 1900–1904	Succeeded by Thomas A. Rickert
Preceded by Henry White	General Secretary of the United Garment Workers of America; 1904–1928	Succeeded by Jacob L. Wines
Preceded by Andrew Furuseth; James J. Creamer	American Federation of Labor delegate to the Trades Union Congress; 1909; With: Samuel Gompers; John P. Frey	Succeeded by William Bauchop Wilson; Thomas V. O'Connor
