= William B. Wilson =

American politician (1862–1934)

William Wilson
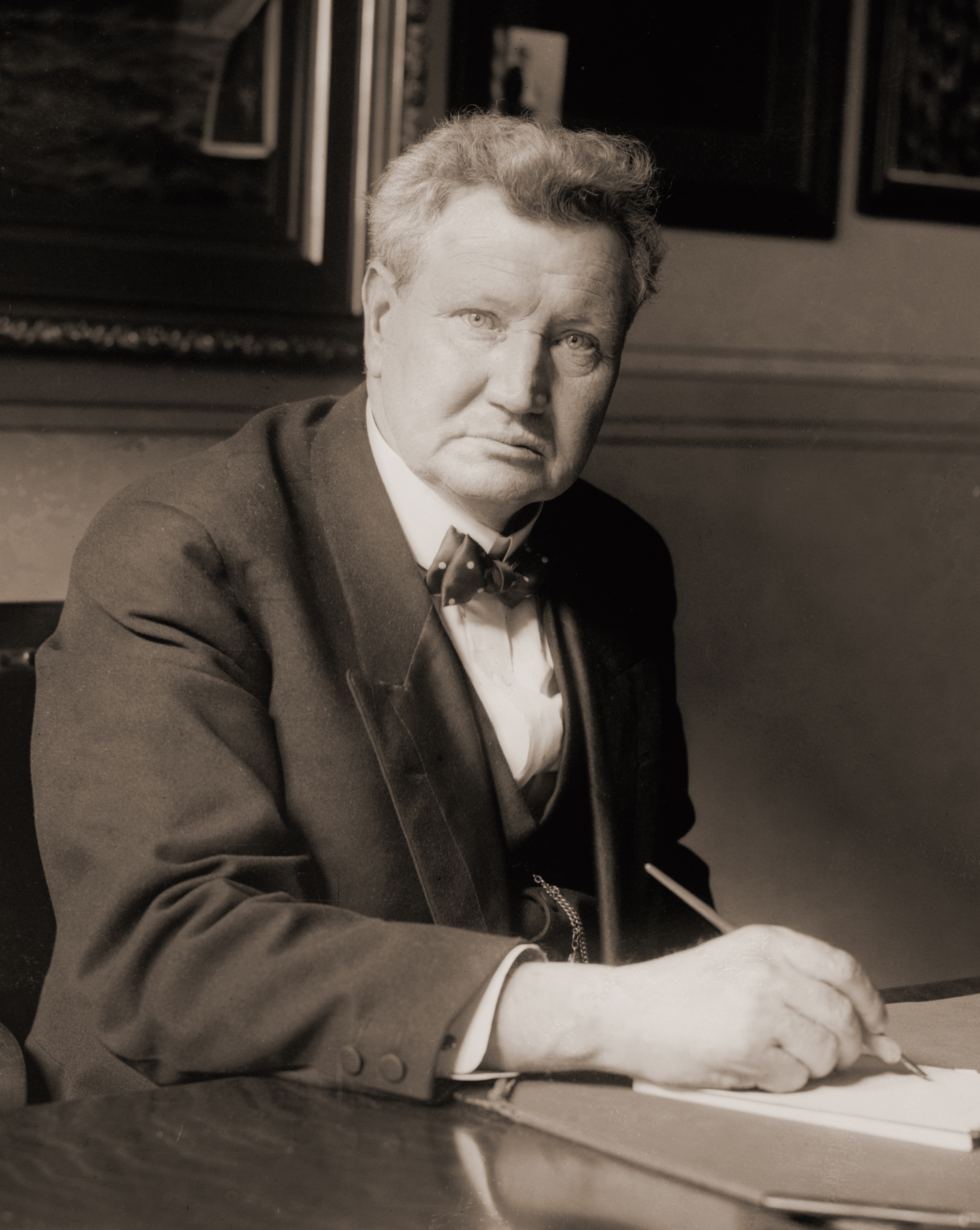
- Wilson in 1913

1st United States Secretary of Labor
- In office March 5, 1913 – March 5, 1921
- President: Woodrow Wilson
- Preceded by: Office established Charles Nagel as Secretary of Commerce and Labor
- Succeeded by: James Davis

Member of the U.S. House of Representatives from Pennsylvania's 15th district
- In office March 4, 1907 – March 4, 1913
- Preceded by: Elias Deemer
- Succeeded by: Edgar Kiess

Personal details
- Born: April 2, 1862 Blantyre, Scotland
- Died: May 25, 1934 (aged 72) Savannah, Georgia, U.S.
- Party: Democratic

William Bauchop Wilson (April 2, 1862 – May 25, 1934) was an American labor leader and progressive politician who served as the first United States secretary of labor from 1913 to 1921 under President Woodrow Wilson (no relation). After having worked as a child and adult in the coal mines of Pennsylvania, he became active as a labor organizer.

== Biography ==
=== Early life ===
William B. Wilson was born in Blantyre, Lanarkshire, Scotland. He was the third child of Adam Black Wilson and Helen Nelson (Bauchop) Wilson, and the first to survive early childhood. His father was a coal miner.

During a mining strike in February 1868, the family was evicted from their company-owned home as the company tried to suppress the strike. His father Adam Wilson traveled around Scotland unsuccessfully trying to find other work. He ultimately decided to emigrate to the United States to find employment there, and left his wife and three children, sailing by ship across the Atlantic in April 1870.

Adam Wilson found work in the bituminous coal region of Pennsylvania, settling in the little town of Arnot, located in Tioga County. After finding a job, he sent for his wife and family. Together with his father-in-law, they departed Glasgow for the United States in August 1870.

Immediately after arriving in the United States, the boy William Wilson was enrolled in public school in Arnot. This interval proved to be short-lived, however, as his father began to suffer serious back problems and was unable to complete his work without assistance. At the age of 9, William was removed from school and sent to help his father in the mines. He continued to work as a miner for nearly two decades.

In 1874, young William engaged in labor organizing for the first time when he attempted to launch a union for the boys who worked as trappers, manually operating the ventilation of the mines. When the fledgling union threatened a strike over a wage reduction, union representative Wilson discovered the limits of union solidarity. He was paddled by a foreman and the incipient strike was broken.

The event proved to be a valuable learning experience for Wilson, who later recalled in his unpublished memoirs:

His argument had been forceful and effective, but it was applied to the wrong part of my anatomy to be permanently convincing.... It helped impress upon my mind the fact that until working men were as strong, collectively, as their employers, they would be forced...to accept whatever conditions were imposed upon them.

In 1876, when Wilson was just 14 years old, there was declining membership in the local Miners' and Laborers' Benevolent Association. They selected Wilson, the energetic youngster, as the organization's Secretary. He began to correspond with other labor activists around the country, laying the groundwork for his career as a trade union organizer and leader.

=== United Mine Workers official ===
He served as international secretary-treasurer of the United Mine Workers of America from 1900 to 1908.

=== House of Representatives ===
He was elected as a Democrat from Pennsylvania's 15th congressional district to the Sixtieth, Sixty-first, and Sixty-second Congresses. He served as chairman of the United States House Committee on Labor during the Sixty-second Congress. Wilson was an unsuccessful candidate for reelection in 1912 and for election in 1914.

In 1909, Wilson became the first member of Congress to put forward a bill providing for a nationwide system of old-age pensions, but it failed to pass.

=== Secretary of Labor ===
He was appointed United States Secretary of Labor in the Cabinet of President Woodrow Wilson and served from March 5, 1913, to March 5, 1921. One of the first efforts he focused on was getting underway the newly created United States Conciliation Service, whose purpose was to provide mediation for labor disputes. During the First World War, he was a member of the Council of National Defense. The administration was working to encourage African-American support for the war effort, both among men who served and those who were working in war industries.

Among his special assistants was George Edmund Haynes, 1918 to 1921, who was the first African American to earn a doctorate from Columbia University. Haynes served as Director of Negro Economics in the United States Department of Labor. Competition was fierce for the higher-paying jobs in the defense industries, and during Red Summer of 1919, whites attacked blacks in numerous cities. Haynes tried to mitigate racial conflict in employment, housing, and recreation. He also continued his earlier work in studying how blacks were excluded from certain trade unions, interracial conditions in the workplace, and issues in child labor.

Wilson was a member of the Federal Board for Vocational Education from 1914 to 1921 and served as chairman of the board in 1920 and 1921. He was appointed on March 4, 1921, a member of the International Joint Commission, created to prevent disputes regarding the use of the boundary waters between the United States and Canada, and served until March 21, 1921, when he resigned.

In December 1916, Wilson addressed a conference on social insurance in which he discussed State developments in that field, such as the provision of mothers' pensions and workmen's compensation, and also spoke of the possibility of the United States introducing old-age pensions and universal health insurance. The Department of Labor had earlier in Wilson's term expressed favor towards an invitation to attend an International Conference on Social Insurance.

=== Later years and death ===
Wilson was an unsuccessful candidate for election to the United States Senate in 1926 against Republican William Scott Vare. After his public service he was engaged in mining and agricultural pursuits near Blossburg, Pennsylvania.

He died on board a train near Savannah, Georgia on May 25, 1934. He was buried in Arbon Cemetery in Blossburg.

=== Legacy ===
In 2007, Wilson was named to the U.S. Department of Labor's Labor Hall of Fame. It is located inside the North Plaza of the headquarters at the Frances Perkins Building on 200 Constitution Avenue NW, Washington, D.C.

== See also ==
- List of foreign-born United States Cabinet members

== Footnotes ==
U.S. House of Representatives
Preceded by Elias Deemer	Member of the U.S. House of Representatives from Pennsylvania's 15th congressional district 1907–1913	Succeeded by Edgar Kiess
Preceded by John J. Gardner	Chair of the House Labor Committee; 1911–1913	Succeeded by David Lewis
Political offices
New office	United States Secretary of Labor; 1913–1921	Succeeded by James Davis
Party political offices
Preceded by Fred Kerr	Democratic nominee for U.S. Senator from Pennsylvania (Class 3); 1926	Succeeded by Sedgwick Kistler
Trade union offices
Preceded by William Charles Pearce	Secretary-Treasurer of the United Mine Workers of America; 1900–1908	Succeeded by William D. Ryan
Preceded by Samuel Gompers; John P. Frey; Bernard A. Larger	American Federation of Labor delegate to the Trades Union Congress; 1910; With: Thomas V. O'Connor	Succeeded by Daniel J. Tobin; William B. Macfarlane
