= Ida Braiman =

Ukrainian garments worker

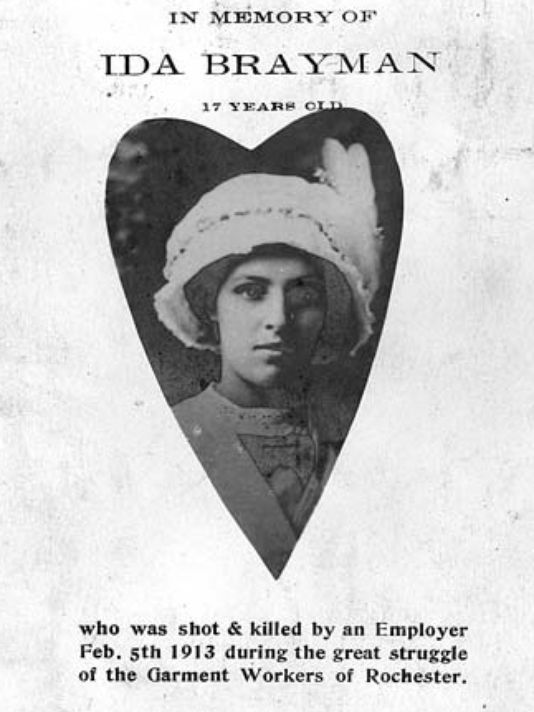
Memorial card commemorating the death of Ida Braiman

Ida Braiman (died February 5, 1913) (sometimes spelled Brayman, Breiman, or Braeman) was a Ukrainian Jewish garment worker killed while on strike for better working conditions in Rochester, New York. Her death brought statewide attention to the 1913 Rochester Garment Workers' Strike.

== Early life ==
Not much is known about Braiman's life before she arrived in New York State as an immigrant to the United States from Zhitomyr, Ukraine. Her age at the time of her arrival is given variously as 17 or 18 years old.

== Rochester strike ==
Ida Braiman and her father were participants in a citywide strike of the United Garment Workers of America only months after her arrival in the United States. On February 5, 1913, she was part of a group of strikers going to small textile factories encouraging workers their to join the strike. The strikers, a crowd of some seven hundred people, picketed a tailor shop owned by Valentine Sauter. When picketers began to throw stones, Valentine Sauter used a shotgun to fire into the crowd, killing Braiman and injuring three others. Although Sauter was arrested and charged with first-degree murder, a grand jury declined to indict him. Several strikers from the crowd were also arrested for rioting.

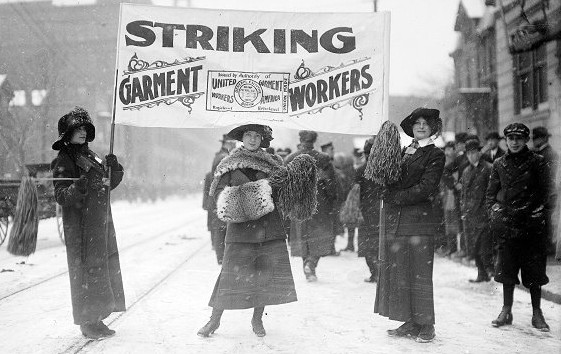
1913 Rochester Garment Workers' strike

Braiman's death became a rallying point for the striking workers, and garnered support for the strike from middle- and upper-class women's suffrage organizers. Five thousand people attended her funeral and processed behind the hearse carrying her body to the graveyard. She was buried in the Waad Hakolel Jewish cemetery in Rochester.

In 2013 Braiman was honored by Rochester labor organizations on the 100th anniversary of her death.[2] The memorial card that was distributed after her death was adopted by the women's liberation movement of the 1970s as a symbol of feminist history, and reprinted as a poster by the Times Change Press in New York City. now in Sebastopol California reprinting the poster [6]
