= National Committee for Modification of the Volstead Act =

The National Committee for Moderation of the Volstead Act was an organization established in January 1931 by the American Federation of Labor. Headed by AFL vice-president Matthew Woll, he testified before a Congressional committee that workers and organized labor opposed prohibition in the United States. Labor leadership argued that the 18th Amendment establishing federal prohibition was the first instance in American history when an amendment to the United States Constitution denied rights instead of creating or expanding them. The committee's activities helped lead to the repeal of prohibition.
