= Thomas V. O'Connor =

Thomas Ventry O'Connor (August 9, 1870 – October 17, 1935) was a Canadian-born American labor union leader.

Born in Toronto, Ontario, O'Connor moved to Buffalo, New York when he was 12 years old. He became a fireman on a tugboat, rising to become a marine engineer. In 1906, he was elected as president of the Licensed Tugmen's Protective Association of the Great Lakes, and then in 1908, as president of the International Longshoremen's Association.

As president of the union, O'Connor ran recruitment drives on the East Coast. He tended to oppose strike action, but led the union through a lengthy strike in 1919. By this point, many in the union wanted more militant leadership.

O'Connor was a supporter of the Republican Party. In 1921, Warren G. Harding offered him the post of Assistant Secretary of Labor, which he rejected. However, in June, he accepted a seat on the United States Shipping Board, resigning his union post. He became vice-chair of the board, and then in 1924 was appointed as its chair. As chair, he was seen to favor the interests of shipping companies over those of sailors and longshoremen.

In 1933, F. D. Roosevelt was elected, and did not reappoint O'Connor to the Shipping Board. O'Connor's record was investigated by a Senate committee, which found that he had shown favoritism in awarding subsidies and selling government ships to some companies, had spent extravagantly, and that board members had accepted favors from some companies. O'Connor continued to deny the charges until his death, in 1935.

Trade union offices
Preceded by Daniel Keefe	President of the International Longshoremen's Association; 1908–1921	Succeeded by Anthony Chlopek
Preceded by Samuel Gompers; John P. Frey; Bernard A. Larger	American Federation of Labor delegate to the Trades Union Congress; 1910; With: William Bauchop Wilson	Succeeded by Daniel J. Tobin; William B. Macfarlane
