= Keith Johnston =

Keith Johnston(e) may refer to:

- Keith Johnstone (badminton), played in Australian National Badminton Championships
- Keith Johnstone (born 1933), playwright and director

== See also ==
- Keith Johnson (disambiguation)
