= Sidney J. Kent =

Sidney John Kent (July 29, 1854 – December 2, 1939) was a British-born American labor unionist and business executive.

Born in Lambeth in England, Kent emigrated to the United States in 1872, settling in Lincoln, Nebraska. There, he joined the United Brotherhood of Carpenters and Joiners of America. He was elected as vice-president of the union in 1890, and then served on its executive board from 1891. In 1898, he became deputy commissioner of the Nebraska Bureau of Labor and Industrial Statistics, and in 1900, he served as the American Federation of Labor's delegate to the British Trades Union Congress.

In the 1900s, Kent worked as a traveling agent, until he settled in Laramie, Wyoming. He became a finance company executive, and moved to Chicago. He retired to Altadena, California, where he died in 1939.

Kent's son, Sidney Raymond Kent, became the first president of 20th Century Fox.

Trade union offices
Preceded by James O'Connell; Thomas F. Tracy	American Federation of Labor delegate to the Trades Union Congress; 1900; With: J. M. Hunter	Succeeded by Daniel Keefe; Eugene F. O'Rourke
