= Binniehill =

Coordinates: 55.929°N 03.836°W

Binniehill: Scottish Gaelic: Am Binnean
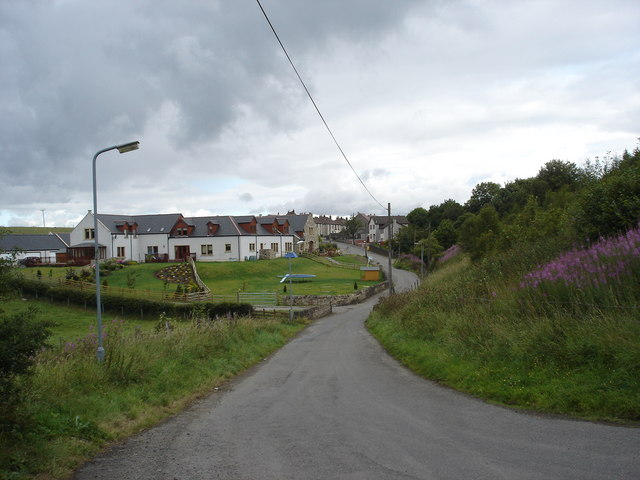
- Binniehill Farm and hamlet

- Location within the Falkirk council area
- OS grid reference: NS853721
- Civil parish: Slamannan
- Council area: Falkirk
- Country: Scotland
- Sovereign state: United Kingdom
- Post town: FALKIRK
- Postcode district: FK1
- Dialling code: 01324
- Police: Scotland
- Fire: Scottish
- Ambulance: Scottish
- UK Parliament: Falkirk
- Scottish Parliament: Falkirk East

Binniehill is a village in Falkirk, Scotland. The name is a tautology, with "binnie" coming from Scottish Gaelic "binnean" meaning a small hill.
