= Keith Johnson (applied linguist) =

British academic linguist (born 1944)

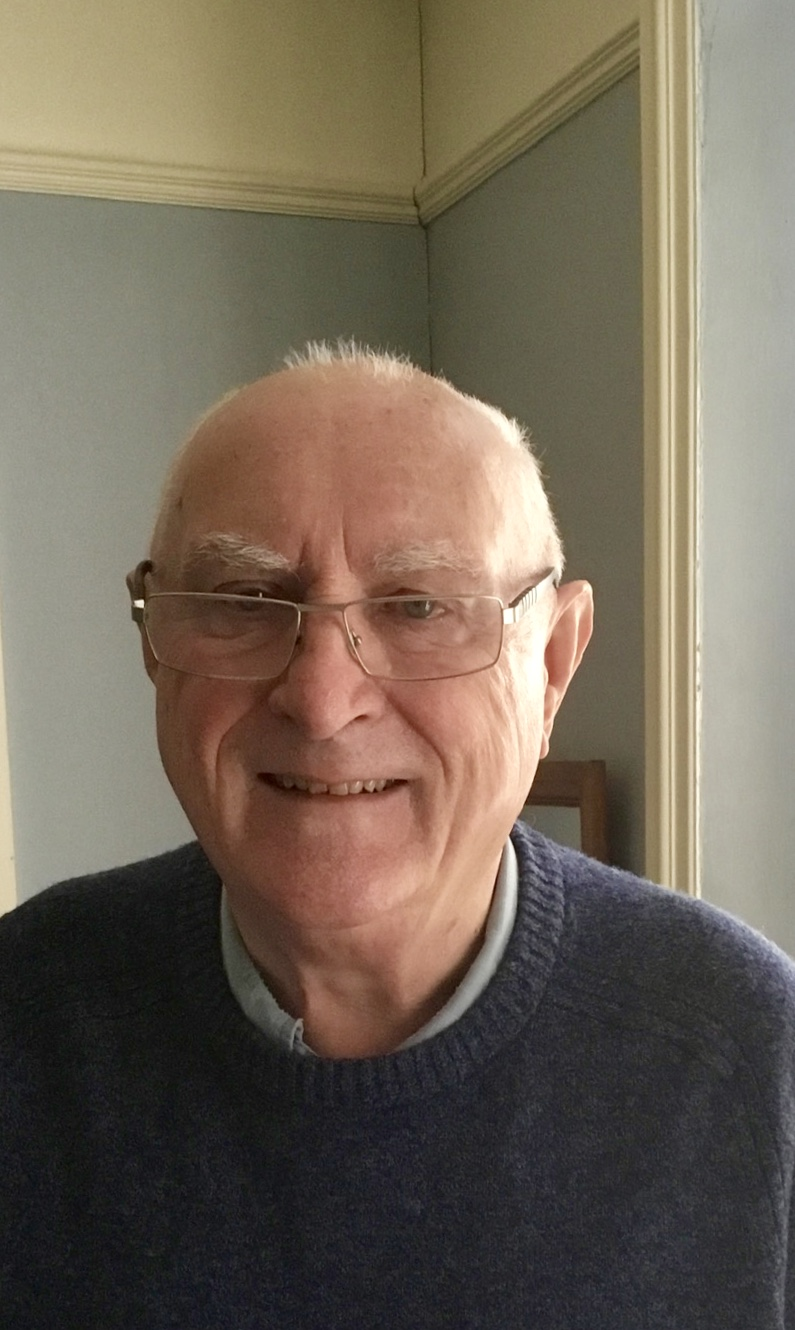
- Born: 29 August 1944 (age 82); London, United Kingdom
- Known for: Language teaching; Second language acquisition; Shakespeare's language; History of English
- Spouse: Helen Johnson
- Children: Hugh Charles Johnson

Academic background
- Education: St Catherine's College, Oxford

Academic work
- Discipline: Linguist
- Sub-discipline: applied linguistics
- Institutions: University of Reading; University of Essex; Lancaster University
- Website: www.keithjohnsonhome.com

Keith Johnson (born 1944) is a British linguist. He is currently an emeritus professor at the Department of Linguistics and English Language of Lancaster University, United Kingdom. His research focuses on applied linguistics with a special focus on second language acquisition and language teaching.

== Career ==
Johnson was one of the three members at the Centre for Applied Language Studies at the University of Reading. He later moved to the Department of Linguistic Science of University of Reading.

He became a Senior Lecturer to the University of Essex.

In 1994 he became a full professor at the Department of Linguistics and English Language at Lancaster University.

He was the founding editor of the Language Teaching Research journal.

He was also a visiting professor at the University of Vienna and the Hong Kong Institute of Education.

== Research ==
One of Johnson’s main interests has been in the study of language teaching expertise - areas of expertise shown by language teachers and others working in the language teaching profession (task designers, materials writers, textbook evaluators etc.). He has been involved in a number of externally funded research projects in this area: looking at expertise in task design (as part of a team supported by the ESRC, then individually supported by The Leverhulme Trust); looking at the practices of expert teachers of non-language skills (e.g. teachers of music, sports) and considering their implications for the language teacher (supported by the AHRC). Johnson’s work in expertise was taken forward at Lancaster by the research group known as LATEX, for LAnguage Teaching EXpertise research group.

== Publications ==
Johnson has publications in several major journals such as System, ITL International Journal of Applied Linguistics, Language Teaching Research, E L T Journal.

== Bibliography ==
=== Books ===
- Johnson, K., and Brumfit, C. J. (eds) (1979) The Communicative Approach to Language Teaching. Oxford: Oxford University Press
- Johnson, K., and Morrow, K. E. (eds) (1981) Communication in the Classroom. Harlow: Longman
- Johnson, K. (1982) Communicative Syllabus Design and Methodology. Oxford: Pergamon Institute of English.
- Johnson, K., and Porter, D. (eds) (1983) Perspectives in Communicative Language Teaching. London: Academic Press.
- Johnson, K. (1996) Language Teaching and Skill Learning. Oxford: Blackwell Publishers
- Johnson, K., and Johnson, H. (eds) (1998) Encyclopedic Dictionary of Applied Linguistics: A handbook for language teaching. Oxford: Blackwell Publishers.
- Johnson, K. (2003) Designing Language Teaching Tasks Basingstoke: Palgrave Macmillan
- Johnson, K. (ed.) (2005) Expertise in Second Language Learning and Teaching Basingstoke: Palgrave Macmillan.
- Johnson, K. (2013) Shakespeare’s English. London: Routledge.
- Johnson, K. (2016) The History of Early English. London: Routledge.
- Johnson, K. (2018) Expertise in Second Language Learning and Teaching: Revised Third Edition. London: Routledge.
- Johnson, K. (2019) Shakespeare’s Language: Perspectives Past and Present. London: Routledge.
- Johnson, K. (2021) The History of Late Modern Englishes. London: Routledge.

=== Articles and chapters ===
• Johnson, K. (1981). ‘ "Systematic" and "non-systematic" components in a communicative approach to language teaching.”. In Richertich, R., & Widdowson, H. G. (eds). Description, Presentation et Enseignement des Language. Paris: Hatier, p. 60-72.

• Johnson, K (1988). ‘Mistake correction’. ELT Journal. 42, 2, p. 89-96.

• Johnson, K. (1993). ‘Teaching declarative and procedural knowledge’, In Bygate, M., Williams, E. & Tonkyn, A. (eds.). Grammar and the Language Teacher. London: Prentice Hall, p. 121-131.

• Johnson, K. (2000). ‘What task designers do’. Language Teaching Research. 4, 3, p. 301-321.

• Johnson, K. (2002) ‘Language as skill’. ELT Journal. 56, 2, p. 190-191.

• Johnson, K. (2002) ‘Is it a wood or are they trees?’ In Miller, K. S. & Thompson, P. (eds.). Unity and diversity in language use. London: Continuum, pp. 138–151.

• Johnson, K., Kim, M., Ya-Fang, L., Nava, A., Perkins, D., Smith, A. M., Soler-Canela, O. & Lu, W. (2008) ‘A step forward: Investigating expertise in materials evaluation’. ELT Journal. 62, 2, p. 157-163.

• Johnson, K. (2009) ‘Foreign language syllabus design’. In Knapp, K. & Seidlhofer, B. (eds.). Handbook of Foreign Language Communication and Learning. De Gruyter Mouton, p. 309-340.

• Johnson, K. (2010) ‘A Globe for the thirties’. Around the Globe. 44, p. 36-38.

• Johnson, K. (2010) ‘Eating the bitter bread’. Around the Globe. 45, p. 26-27.

• Johnson, K. (2017) ‘Shakespeare and language: An eventful afterlife’. In Levenson, J. & Ormsby, R. (eds.). The Shakespearean World. London: Routledge, p. 496-511.
