= Matthew Woll =

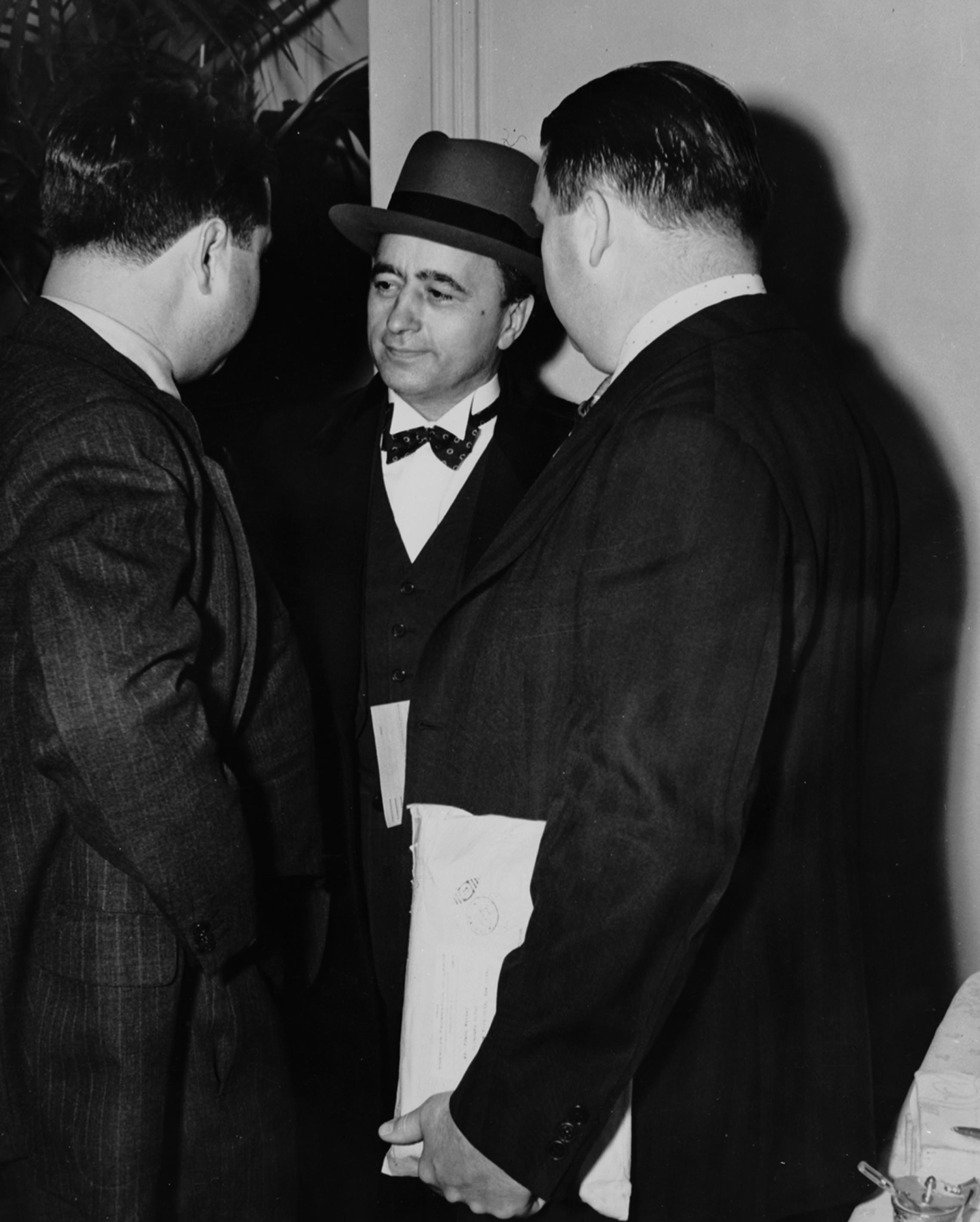
Matthew Woll (center).

Matthew Woll (January 25, 1880 – June 1, 1956) was president of the International Photo-Engravers Union of North America from 1906 to 1929, an American Federation of Labor (AFL) vice president from 1919 to 1955 and an AFL-CIO vice president from 1955 to 1956.

== Early life ==
Born in Luxembourg in 1880 to Michael and Janette Woll, the Roman Catholic Wolls emigrated to the United States and settled in Chicago, Illinois. Matthew Woll attended public school until the age of 15, then became an apprentice photo-engraver. He entered the Kent College of Law (then part of Lake Forest University) in 1901. He took night courses, graduated and was admitted to the bar in 1904.

== Early Trade Union Career ==
In 1906, Woll was elected president of the International Photo-Engravers Union of North America (IPEU). During his tenure, IPEU organized more than 90 percent of all photo-engravers in the United States and Canada. A firm believer in arbitration rather than the strike, Woll forced nearly all IPEU locals to agree to binding arbitration clauses in their collective bargaining agreements. Woll also campaigned heavily for the five-day work week, paid vacations and holidays, and health and welfare benefits. By the mid-1920s, IPEU had achieved most of these goals.

Woll served as AFL fraternal delegate to the British Trades Union Congress in 1915 and 1916. During World War I, he served on the War Labor Board.

== AFL career ==
In 1919, Woll was elected to the executive council of the American Federation of Labor.

In 1924, when AFL president Samuel Gompers died, Woll was widely expected to take the reins of the organization. But John L. Lewis, president of the United Mine Workers of America, wanted the presidency for himself. But Lewis was unable to muster enough support for his candidacy, and threw his weight behind Mine Worker secretary William Green in the mistaken belief that he could use Green as a puppet to control the AFL. But Green found a kindred anti-communist in Woll, and the two became close.

Over time, Woll took on a number of additional responsibilities—including becoming president of the AFL's union label department; director of the AFL's legal bureau; chairman of the AFL's standing committees on education, social security and international relations. He resigned as IPEU president in 1929 and became first vice-president of the union.

Woll is also noted for being the chief proponent of a union-owned insurance company. Woll believed that the purpose of such a company would be "to sell insurance to individual workers without profit, to sell insurance to whole organizations and, thus, weaken the hold of employers on their workers through group insurance." Woll convinced the AFL to provide the start-up money for such an organization. The Union Labor Life Insurance Company (ULLICO) opened its doors on May 1, 1925. Woll was president of the company from 1925 to 1955, and then its general executive chairman from 1955 until his death.

In the mid-1920s, Woll became acting president of the National Civic Federation. Woll pushed the federation to collaborate with a broad array of anti-communist organizations. He was forced to step down as acting president after coming under attack by Lewis at the 1935 AFL-CIO convention.

In the early 1930s, Woll helped found and then headed up the AFL's National Committee for Modification of the Volstead Act, an organization seeking repeal of Prohibition.

Woll published Our Next Step (Harper & Bros.), a treatise on economic policy, with William English Walling in 1934. The work called for federal policies which would encourage a shift from profits to wages in order to expand consumer purchasing power. In 1935, Woll published Labor, Industry and Government (D. Appleton-Century), a treatise on labor relations.

Woll was a strong supporter of craft unionism. During the debates over the Congress of Industrial Organizations (CIO), Woll portrayed himself as a conciliator and mediator, but worked behind the scenes to undercut Mine Workers president John L. Lewis and other proponents of industrial unionism.

Increasingly obsessed with international affairs and the Soviet Union, Woll served as an AFL delegate to the International Federation of Trade Unions conference in 1937 and to the International Labour Organization's conference in 1938.

Woll believed, as had his mentor and friend, Samuel Gompers, that labor's best hope for survival lay in forging a labor-management entente. Subsequently, Woll advocated free-market positions, including strongly anti-regulatory views. This led Woll to oppose the Fair Labor Standards Act of 1938, which Woll saw as merely more government intervention in the workplace.

During World War II, Woll served on the National War Labor Board. After the war, Woll served as a consultant to the United Nations on trade union issues, and was instrumental in working with Eleanor Roosevelt to incorporate language specifically protecting the right to form and/or join a union into Article 23 of the Universal Declaration of Human Rights.

Woll was elected a vice-president of the AFL-CIO after the two organizations merged in 1955.

== Personal life ==
Matthew married Irene C. Kerwin in Chicago on April 4, 1900. Together they had three children: Margaret, Willard and Joseph Albert. Margaret died after one day. Willard and Joseph Albert were born while Matthew was studying law at Kent College. Willard attended MIT and worked as an engineer at Commonwealth Edison in Chicago. Joseph Albert was a successful lawyer in Chicago and Washington, DC.

Irene died in 1946. Later in 1946 Matthew married Celeanor Dugas, who was born in Saint Paul, MN in 1887 to Leopold Eli Dugas and Susan Coleman. Matthew Woll died in June 1956, Celeonor died eleven years later. They are buried together in Fort Lincoln Cemetery in Brentwood, Maryland.

== Legacy ==
A lifelong Republican, Woll is considered one of the most conservative of all major American labor leaders. For example, at the AFL-CIO convention in Atlantic City, New Jersey, in 1935, Woll bitterly denounced the Wagner Act as a betrayal of the legacy of Samuel Gompers.

A staunch anti-communist, Woll eventually became a confidant of AFL president Samuel Gompers and other like-minded labor leaders such as William Green of the United Mine Workers of America. Green in particular relied heavily on Woll for advice and policy guidance during his term as president of the AFL. Woll also became a mentor to Jay Lovestone, the one-time Communist who was expelled from the party only to become a leading opponent of Communism, and an influential AFL-CIO foreign policy advisor. In 1944, the AFL-CIO established the Free Trade Union Committee (FTUC) to assist free trade unions abroad, particularly in Europe. Lovestone was named its secretary, reporting (in part) to Woll. Lovestone's mission was to eliminate pro-Communist unions and supplant them with unions which supported capitalism. The Central Intelligence Agency funneled millions of dollars through FTUC in support of American foreign policy goals.

Woll's influence on Green is difficult to understate. In many ways, Matthew Woll designed AFL-CIO policy through his relationship with Green and AFL-CIO secretary-treasurer George Meany.

Mild-mannered and courtly, Green strongly believed in an evangelical "Christian cooperation" worldview similar to the social gospel, in which men of good moral character would do right by one another if only they committed themselves to Christ. Green's views dovetailed with those of Woll, who advocated a cooperative rather than adversarial relationship with management.

Green's religious views also led him to adopt a virulently anti-Communist outlook. They effectively played on Green's Christian idealism and fears of "godless Communism" to neutralize Communist leaders and fellow travellers throughout the labor movement and seek their ouster.

Trade union offices
Preceded by Louis Flader	President of the International Photo-Engravers Union of North America; 1906–1929	Succeeded by Edward J. Volz
Preceded by Charles L. Baine; Louis Kemper	American Federation of Labor delegate to the Trades Union Congress; 1916; With: William D. Mahon	Succeeded by James Lord; John Golden
Preceded by George William Perkins	President of the Union Label Trades Department; 1934–1956	Succeeded by John J. Mara
Preceded by Jacob Fischer	Fourth Vice-President of the American Federation of Labor; 1928–1930	Succeeded by James Wilson
Preceded by Jacob Fischer	Third Vice-President of the American Federation of Labor; 1930–1942	Succeeded by Joseph N. Weber
Preceded by Thomas A. Rickert	Second Vice-President of the American Federation of Labor; 1942–1953	Succeeded by George McGregor Harrison
Preceded by William Hutcheson	First Vice-President of the American Federation of Labor; 1953–1955	Succeeded by Federation merged
