= Budish =

Budish is a surname. Notable people with the surname include:

- Armond Budish (born 1953), American politician
- Eric Budish, American educator
- Jacob M. Budish (J.M. Budish), 20th-century American labor economist
- Zach Budish (born 1991), American ice hockey player
