= International Woodworkers of America =

Former trade union of the United States

- Woodworkers District Lodge W1
- Woodworkers Department logo
- Abbreviation: IWA
- Merged into: US: International Association of Machinists; Canada: USW Canada
- Successor: Woodworkers Department, IAM; various Canadian Steelworker locals
- Formation: 1937
- Founder: Harold Pritchett
- Dissolved: US: 1994; Canada: 2004
- Type: Labor union
- Origins: Sawmill and Timber Workers' Union, UBCJA
- Region served: Canada and the United States
- Fields: Forestry, timber, woodworking
- Members: US: 20,000 (1994)
- Affiliations: CIO, AFL-CIO, CLC-CTC
- Website: Woodworkers Department

International Woodworkers of America (IWA) was an international industrial union which represented lumbermen, sawmill workers, timber transportation workers and others from to 1937 to 2004. The American division is now the Woodworkers Department of the International Association of Machinists (IAM).

== History ==
The IWA was formed when members of the Sawmill and Timber Workers' Union division of the United Brotherhood of Carpenters and Joiners of America voted to disaffiliate their local unions and form their own union. The IWA subsequently affiliated with the Congress of Industrial Organizations (CIO).

The IWA quickly moved into Canada, where it absorbed a number of smaller unions which had formed in the 1930s, and the Lumber Workers Industrial Union, one of the industrial unions of the Industrial Workers of the World. Harold Pritchett was elected president. A successful strike and organizing drive in 1946 established the IWA as western Canada's largest union, a position that it has generally held since then. The union entered Newfoundland in 1956, but was expelled in 1959 after the Newfoundland Loggers' Strike.

The IWA was staunchly Democratic, and avoided left-wing politics throughout its history. Most of its members lived and worked in the American and Canadian West. Its membership reached as high as 115,000 in the early 1970s.

In the 1980s, raids, mergers and anti-union actions by employers decimated the IWA's membership. The burgeoning environmental movement also restricted access to public lands, where most old-growth timber existed. As the timber industry lost access to public land, timber companies shed thousands of jobs as well.

In 1987, the Canadian branch of the IWA separated from union, retaining the IWA initials but with the new name Industrial, Wood and Allied Workers of Canada (IWA Canada).

By 1994, the remainder of the U.S.-based IWA had just over 20,000 members. The IWA leadership felt the union was no longer viable on its own, and it merged with the IAM on May 1, 1994. IWA Canada remained an independent Canadian union until 2004, when it merged with the United Steelworkers.

== Presidents ==
1937: Harold Pritchett
1940: O. M. Orton
1941: Worth Lowery
1943: Claude Ballard
1944: J. E. Fadling
1951: Al Hartung
1967: Ronald F. Roley
1970s: Keith W. Johnson
1980s: Bill Hubbell

== See also ==
- IWA v. Consolidated-Bathurst Packaging Ltd.

== Archives ==
- International Woodworkers of America Records, 1936–1987. 10 cubic feet. At the Labor Archives of Washington State, University of Washington Libraries Special Collections.
- International Woodworkers of America, Local 3-101 Records (Everett, Wash.), 1935–1987. 23 cubic feet. At the Labor Archives of Washington State, University of Washington Libraries Special Collections.
- Records of International Woodworkers of America Association are held by Simon Fraser University's Special Collections and Rare Books
