= Keith Johnson (neurologist) =

American neurologist and radiologist

Keith A. Johnson
- Education: University of Kansas School Of Medicine (MD), Brigham and Women's Hospital (Residency)
- Scientific career
- Institutions: Massachusetts General Hospital

Keith Johnson is an American neurologist and radiologist. He is Professor of Radiology and Neurology at the Harvard Medical School, and Associate Radiologist and Director of Molecular Neuroimaging at the Massachusetts General Hospital. He also is co-director of the Neuroimaging Program of the Massachusetts Alzheimer’s Disease Research Center.

He earned an M.D. at University of Kansas School of Medicine in 1981, and completed his residency at Brigham and Women's Hospital in 1986.

He is one of the top highly-cited researchers (h>100) according to Webometrics.
