= Union label =

Mark indicating labor union affiliation

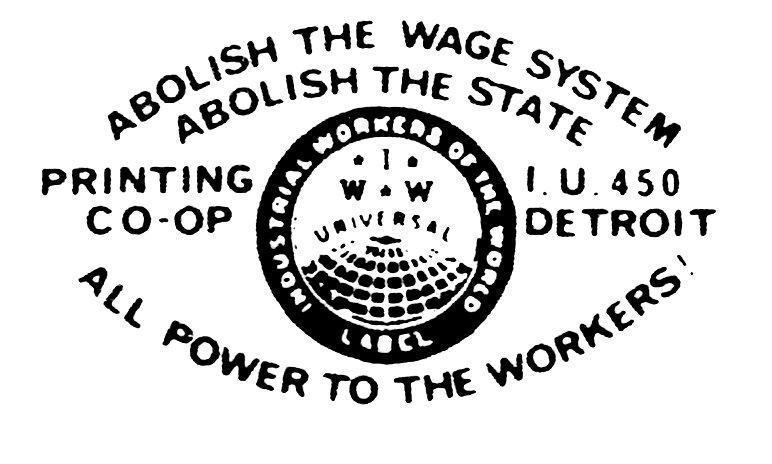
Industrial Workers of the World union label used by Black and Red Press ca. 1973.

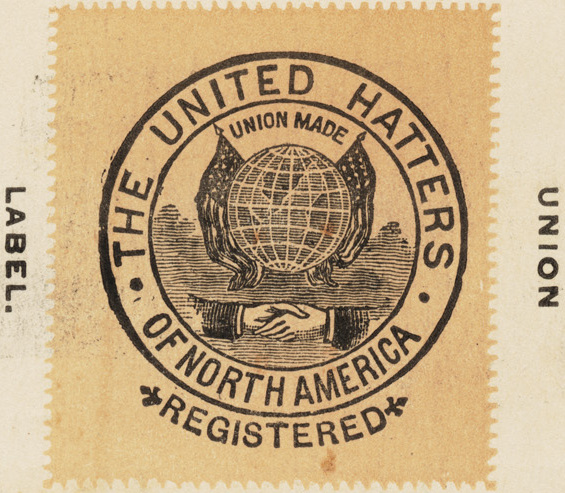
Sewed in union label for hats by The United Hatters of North America, Registered, Union Made

A union label (sometimes called a union bug) is a label, mark or emblem which advertises that the employees who make a product or provide a service are represented by the labor union or group of unions whose label appears, in order to attract customers who prefer to buy union-made products. The term "union bug" is frequently used to describe a minuscule union label appearing on printed materials, which supposedly resembles a small insect.

== Origin and history ==
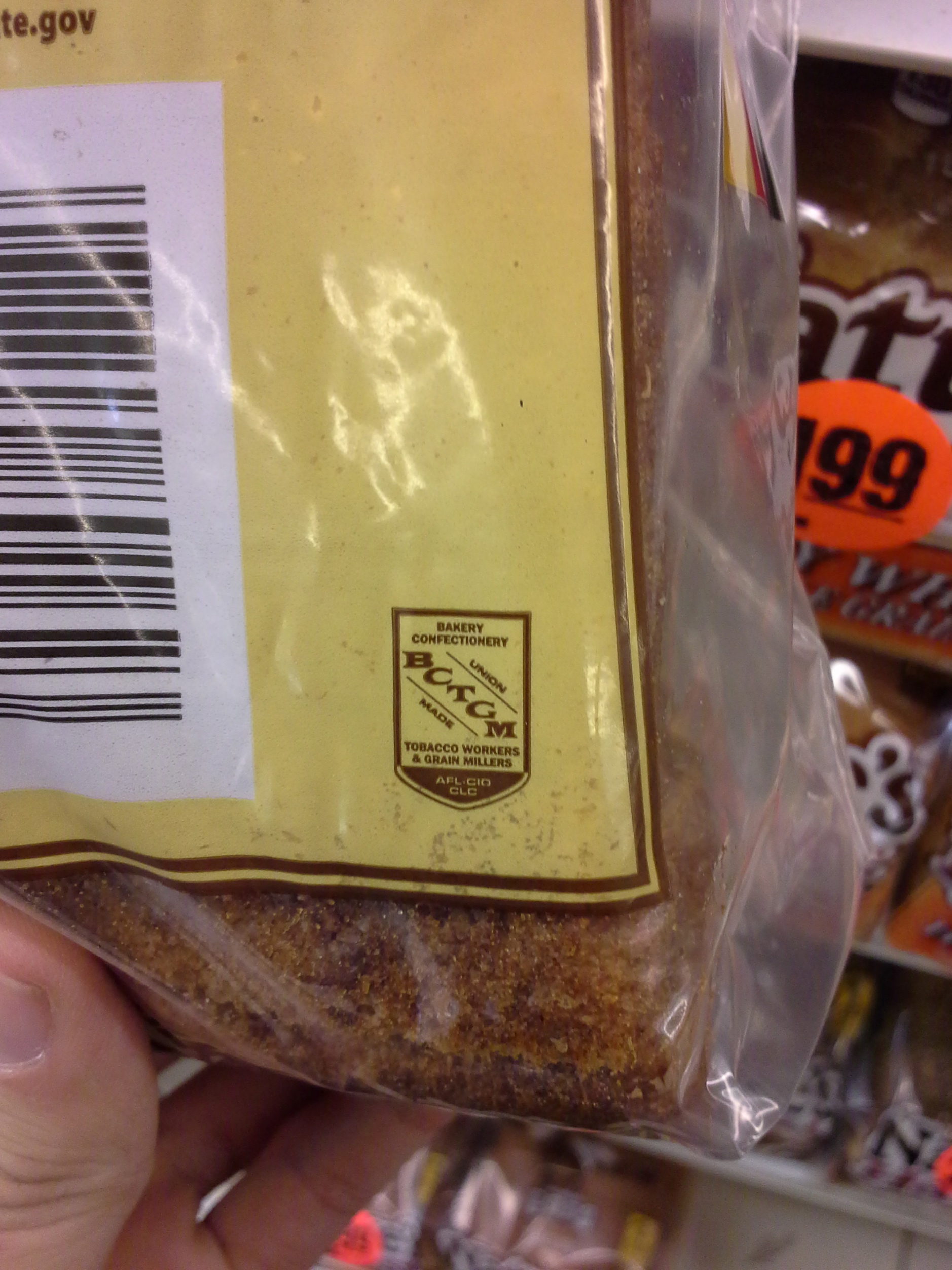
A loaf of bread bearing the union label of the Bakery, Confectionery, Tobacco Workers and Grain Millers' International Union

The invention of the union label concept is attributed to the Carpenter's Eight-Hour League in San Francisco, California which adopted a stamp in 1869 for use on products produced by factories employing men on the eight- (as opposed to ten-) hour day. In 1874, that city's unionized cigar-making workers created a similar "white labor" label to differentiate their cigars from those made by poorly paid, non-unionized Chinese workers. The concept of the union label as a tool for harnessing support from fellow working-class consumers for unionization spread rapidly in the next decades, first among the cigarmakers (their union adopted the first national union label in 1880), but among other unions as well, including typographers, garment workers, coopers, bakers and iron molders. By 1909, the American Federation of Labor had created its Union Label Department.

== See also ==
- Printer's mark
