= James O'Connell (unionist) =

American labor union leader

- Born: August 22, 1858; Minersville, Pennsylvania, US
- Died: October 30, 1936 (aged 78); Washington, D.C., US
- Occupation: Labor leader

James O'Connell (August 22, 1858 – October 30, 1936) was an American labor union leader.

== Biography ==
James O'Connell was born in Minersville, Pennsylvania on August 22, 1858. He completed an apprenticeship as a machinist, then went to work as a machinist on the railroads. He joined the Knights of Labor, and from 1889 to 1891 worked for the union in Harrisburg, Pennsylvania as a lobbyist. In about 1890, he joined what became the International Association of Machinists, and in 1891, he was elected to its executive.

In 1893, O'Connell was elected as Grand Master Machinist, leader of the union, continuing in the post after it was renamed "president" in 1899. In his early years with the union, its headquarters moved periodically, and he relocated first to Chicago, and then in 1900 to Washington DC.

The Machinists were affiliated to the American Federation of Labor (AFL), and in 1896, O'Connell was elected as one of the federation's vice presidents. In 1899, he represented the AFL at the annual Trades Union Congress in England. In addition, from 1901, he served on the executive of the National Civic Federation.

From 1908, O'Connell was the president of the Metal Trades Department of the AFL, and in 1911, this became his full-time role. He served on the government Commission on Industrial Relations in 1913, and on the Committee on Labor of the Advisory Commission of the Council of National Defense during World War I.

In 1926, O'Connell argued for an end to Prohibition. Two years later, he gave a speech calling for a bar on private profits in the manufacture of armaments. In 1933, he gave a speech calling for the AFL to reorganize on the basis of industrial unions, something later taken up by the Congress of Industrial Organizations.

O'Connell retired in 1935, and in Washington, D.C. on October 30, 1936.

Trade union offices
| Preceded by John O'Day | President of the International Association of Machinists; 1893–1911 | Succeeded by William Hugh Johnston |
| Preceded by Department created | President of the Metal Trades Department; 1908–1935 | Succeeded by John P. Frey |
| Preceded by James Duncan; Henry Demarest Lloyd | American Federation of Labor delegate to the Trades Union Congress; 1899; With: Thomas F. Tracy | Succeeded by J. M. Hunter; Sidney J. Kent |
| Preceded by Roady Kenehan | Third Vice-President of the American Federation of Labor; 1895–1913 | Succeeded by Denis A. Hayes |
| Preceded by John Mitchell | Second Vice-President of the American Federation of Labor; 1913–1918 | Succeeded by Joseph F. Valentine |
