= Harold Pritchett =

Canadian labor leader (1904–1982)

- Born: May 9, 1904; Birmingham, England
- Died: 1982 (aged 77–78); Port Coquitlam, British Columbia
- Organization: International Woodworkers of America
- Title: International President, International Woodworkers of America
- Term: 1937-1940

Harold (Harry) Pritchett (1904–1982) was a British-Canadian woodworker and the first president of the International Woodworkers of America (IWA). Often compared to Harry Bridges, Pritchett became the target of redbaiting and was forced to resign his position as international president of the IWA in 1940 after being denied re-entry into the United States due to his ties to the Communist Party.

== Early life ==
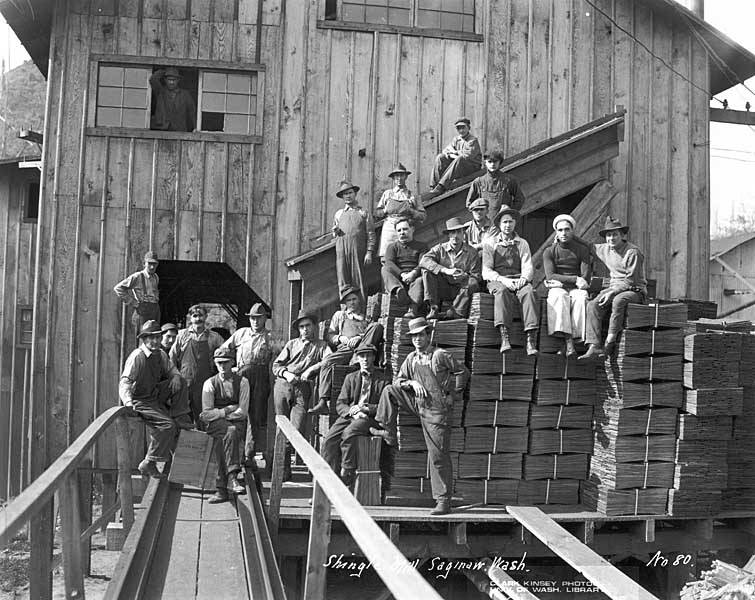
Shingle weavers outside of a shingle mill in Washington, c. 1923. Pritchett worked as a shingle weaver in a mill that would have been similar to this one.

Harold Pritchett was born in Birmingham, England, on May 9, 1904. He immigrated to Canada at age eight with his family and settled in Port Moody, British Columbia. He began working in a sawmill in Port Moody at age fifteen for ten cents per hour. Pritchett stated that his first exposure to unions was in 1921 when he attended a meeting with One Big Union (IWW in Canada), and he became one of the first members of the AFL-affiliated Shingle Weavers Union when it was established in 1925. It was around this time that some historians believe Pritchett became an active member of the Communist Party, though conclusive evidence has not been found. Though Pritchett always publicly denied Party membership, many labor leaders at the time were aware of the negative connotations associated with the Communist Party and sought to keep their membership private. The Communist Party owned property next door to Pritchett in Port Moody that it used for organizing activities, which Pritchett participated in.

== Organizing the CIO ==
=== Expulsion from the Shingle Weavers ===
Pritchett rose to prominence as a promising young organizer in the Shingle Weavers Union and was elected president of his local in 1932. He and his local, however, were expelled from the union in the same year due to alleged communist infiltration. Pritchett then became involved in the Federation of Woodworkers, affiliated with the United Brotherhood of Carpenters and Joiners, led by William Hutcheson, who Pritchett and others frequently clashed with. At a convention in Tacoma in 1937, the Federation of Woodworkers voted to disaffiliate from the Carpenters and Joiners and join the Committee for Industrial Organization (CIO).

=== Organizing the IWA ===
Following their decision to affiliate with the CIO, the Federation of Woodworkers became known as the International Woodworkers of America, and Pritchett was elected the first president. In the early years, Pritchett and other lumber workers found themselves embroiled in a power struggle. Violent clashes erupted as the Carpenters and Joiners sought to boycott all products made by IWA members and block production at IWA-controlled mills. Pritchett also found his control of the union challenged by Al Hartung of the Columbia River District Council (CDRC), who formed a conservative faction within the union known as the Opposition Bloc. Pritchett was able to maintain his control of the union, though the accusations made against him of communist infiltration would ultimately bring about his downfall.

As leader of the IWA, Pritchett embraced the CIO's slogan of "organize the unorganized," and the IWA experienced substantial growth. Membership expanded out of the Pacific Northwest to California, the Midwest, and the American South. The IWA also became extremely powerful in Canada. In the late 1930s, Pritchett went on a series of tours as part of the CIO's campaign to organize the Deep South and made speeches to crowds of both Black and white workers.

=== Deportation ===
In 1939, Pritchett was reelected president of the IWA after another challenge from Hartung. In response, Hartung and his supporters from the CDRC accused Pritchett of fixing the election. Adolph Germer was sent by CIO president John L. Lewis to conduct an organizing drive and bring order to the union. Germer was a staunch anticommunist and collaborated with the CRDC to drive out Pritchett from his position. Pritchett's downfall from the IWA represented an early sign of a shift that occurred in the CIO, as the leadership tried to distance themselves from the union's radical roots.

In 1940, Pritchett announced that he had applied for a permanent resident visa in the United States. Since 1936, he and his family had been living in the US continuously on visitor status, but the permit had expired and was unable to be renewed. In the hearing, Pritchett was barred from entry on the grounds that he was a communist and involved in subversive activities to undermine the US government's authority. Trapped in Vancouver, Pritchett was unable to attend the 1940 IWA convention and was forced to resign his position as international president.

== Post-deportation and later life ==
Pritchett remained involved in the IWA in Canada and became president of a district in British Columbia. Distanced from American anticommunist reactionaries, he also became involved in the leadership of the Labor Progressive Party. In 1948, Pritchett led an attempt to break from the IWA and form a new red union, known as the Woodworkers Industrial Union of Canada. This project was short-lived, and by 1951 the union had dissolved. Pritchett tried multiple times to rejoin the IWA, but he remained permanently banned. He spent the rest of his life working as a sawyer and a shingle weaver. Pritchett died in 1982.
