= Union Label Department, AFL–CIO =

Part of AFL-CIO

Union Label
- Union Label and Service Trades Department, AFL-CIO
- Founded: March 30, 1909
- Headquarters: Washington, D.C.
- Location: United States
- President: Rich Kline
- Parent organization: AFL–CIO
- Website: unionlabel.org

The Union Label and Service Trades Department, AFL–CIO was founded on April 12, 1909, to promote the products and services produced in America by trade union members—especially those products and services identified by a union label, shop card, store card, and/or service button. The department is a constitutionally mandated department of the AFL–CIO.

The department's offices are located at the AFL–CIO headquarters in Washington, D.C. The department has many state and local councils and committees, and works closely with AFL–CIO state and local labor bodies to carry out its functions.

== Activities ==
The ULS&TD primary function is to promote the union label. These emblems demonstrate that the employees who make the product or provide the service are union workers and that they are treated fairly by their employers.

The ULS&TD also coordinates national boycotts that have been endorsed by the AFL–CIO executive council. The department maintains and publishes the "Do Not Buy" list of companies being boycotted, along with the products and services involved. The "Label Letter" publication is the most visible means the department uses to publicize boycott updates. The "Label Letter" features special interest stories, alerts, a "Do Buy" section, and other relevant information. Member unions of the AFL–CIO and their local affiliates often reproduce sections and articles of the newsletter to spread the "union label message" to union members and their families.

== Leadership ==
=== Presidents ===
1909: John Brown Lennon
1911: John F. Tobin
1916: John W. Hays
1926: George William Perkins
1934: Matthew Woll
1956: John J. Mara
1960: Richard F. Walsh
1975: Joseph D. Keenan
1980: John E. Mara
1982: James E. Hatfield
1997: Charles Mercer
2008: Richard Kline

=== Secretary-Treasurers ===
1909: Thomas F. Tracy
1917: John J. Manning
1932: George W. Perkins
1933: John J. Manning
1934: Ira M. Ornbum
1950: Raymond F. Leheney
1957: Joseph Lewis
1971: Edward P. Murphy
1976: Earl D. McDavid
1982: John E. Mara
1988: Sidney Heller
1989: Richard J. Perry
1994: Charles E. Mercer
1997: Dennis L. Kivikko
2003: Matthew C. Bates
2000s: James H. Dunn

== Sources ==
- Foner, Philip S. History of the Labor Movement in the United States. Vol. 3: The Policies and Practices of the American Federation of Labor, 1900–1909. New York: International Publishers, 1964. ISBN 0-7178-0093-8
- Maurice F. Neufeld. "Structure and Government of the AFL–CIO." Industrial and Labor Relations Review. 9:3 (April 1956).
- Union Industries Show features American-made goods. nwlaborpress.org. Retrieved 2024-11-29.
