= Keith Johnson (trade unionist) =

Keith Johnson (July 20, 1930 – May 28, 2012) was a Canadian-American trade union leader. He served as president of the International Woodworkers of America (IWA), an international union operating in the US and Canada, from 1973 to 1987. As of 1980, he was the only Canadian president of an international union. He made approximately US$36,000 in 1980 while working out of the union's Portland, Oregon, office.

== Early life ==
Johnson was born in Edmonton, Alberta. He served in the Canadian Navy for five years and saw extensive action during the Korean War. After the war, he settled in Alberta and began work in a plywood mill. He led an effort to unionize his workplace with the IWA and began a long career in trade union politics.
