= United Garment Workers of America =

Former trade union of the United States

UGWA
- United Garment Workers of America
- Merged into: United Food and Commercial Workers
- Founded: April 1891
- Dissolved: 1994
- Location: United States of America
- Members: 15,000 (1994)
- Affiliations: AFL–CIO

The United Garment Workers of America (UGW or UGWA) was a United States labor union which existed between 1891 and 1994. It was an affiliate of the American Federation of Labor.

== History ==
The UGWA was formed in New York in April 1891 and led a successful strike of 16,000 garment workers in New York City in 1893, but soon adopted a more conservative, conciliatory tone with manufacturers.

Thomas A. Rickert of Chicago served as UGW's president from 1904 through at least 1939.

At the UGW's 1914 convention in Nashville, Tennessee, a number of large urban locals, with stronger Socialist loyalties and more willingness to strike, and who represented a full two-thirds of the national membership, split off to form the rival Amalgamated Clothing Workers of America under Hillman's founding leadership.

In 1994, the UGW's 15,000 members merged into the United Food and Commercial Workers.

== Strikes ==
The union came to national attention with the 1910 Chicago Garment Workers' Strike, which had started as a spontaneous strike on September 22, by a handful of women workers at Hart Schaffner & Marx. It spread to a citywide labor action of almost 40,000 workers that lasted until February 1911. Chicago was then the largest producer of men's garments in the United States, Hart Schaffner & Marx the largest of Chicago manufacturers, and UGW the only union in the industry.

The strike was a bitter one, with hundreds of strikers injured and two killed. Future union president Sidney Hillman was a rank-and-file leader, and lawyer Clarence Darrow was involved with the settlement negotiations. The action not only pitted workers against management and against Chicago police on horseback, it also exposed divisions in the union—namely that the organization did not support its unskilled members. Similar allegations dogged the UGA's mishandling of the 1913 New York Garment Workers Strike, a nine-week walkout of some 85,000 workers.

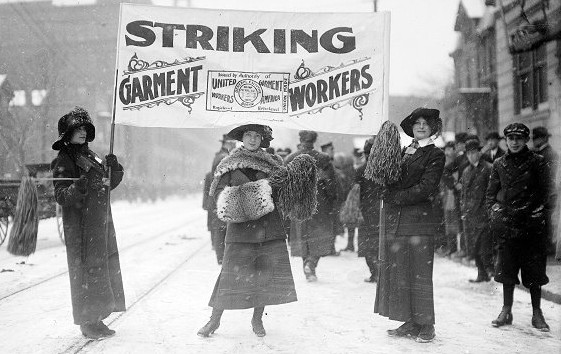
UGW strike, Rochester, New York, 1913

Later UGW strikes included one in February, 1913, in Rochester, New York, where striker Ida Braiman was killed and others wounded by gunfire. During a subsequent strike in Chicago in October 1915, striker Edward Kapper was killed in a riot on October 26, and 10-year-old bystander Leo Schroeder was crushed by a mob on the 29th.

== Presidents ==
1895: Charles Reichers
1897: Bernard A. Larger
1898: ?
1900: Bernard A. Larger
1904: Thomas A. Rickert
1941: Joseph McGurdy
1975: Howard Collins
1977: William O'Donnell
1987: Earl Carroll
1991: David Johnson
