= William Green (U.S. labor leader) =

American trade union leader (1873–1952)

William B. Green
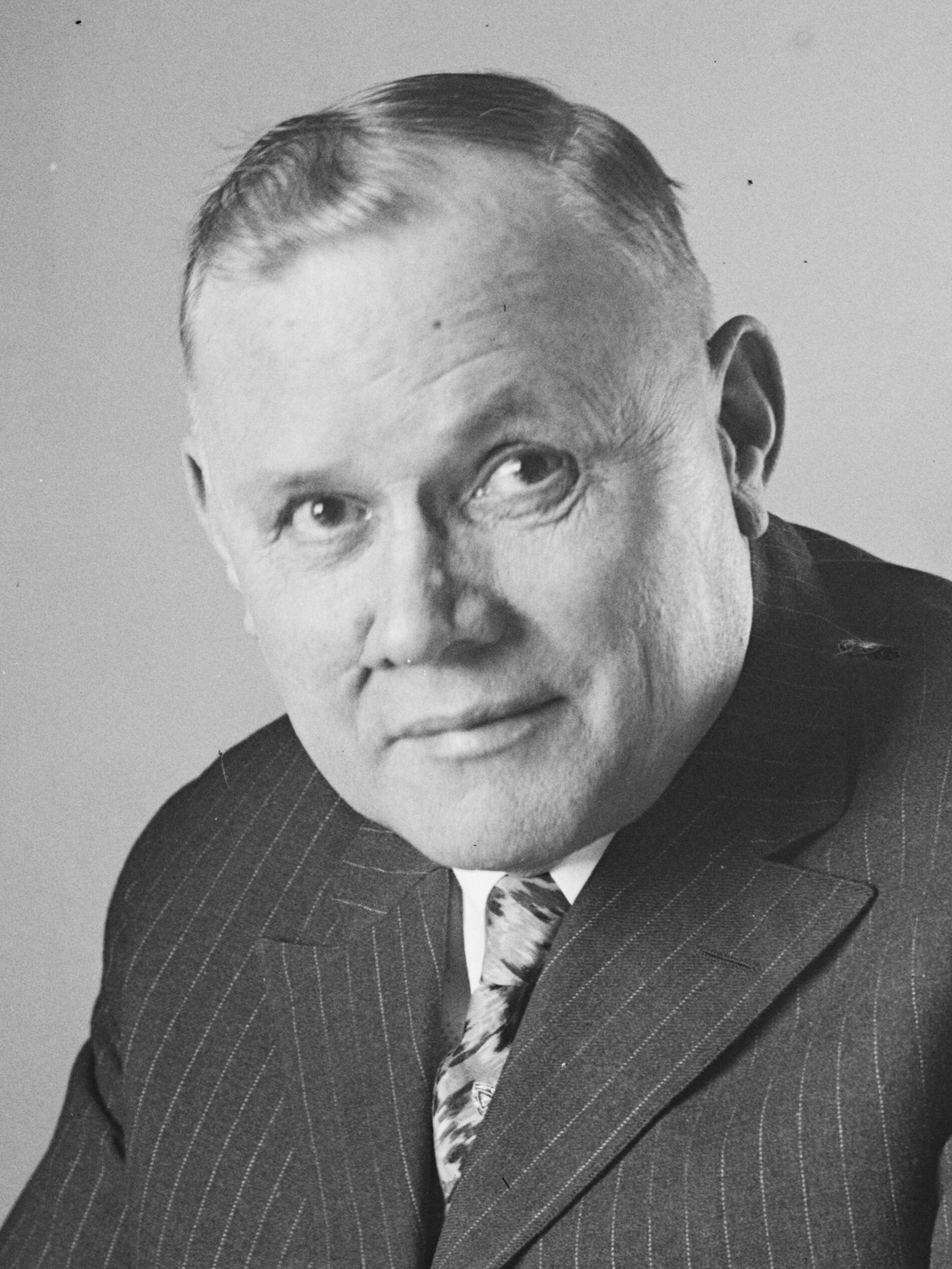
- Green in 1928

4th President of the American Federation of Labor
- In office December 11, 1924 – November 21, 1952
- Preceded by: Samuel Gompers
- Succeeded by: George Meany

6th Secretary-Treasurer of the United Mine Workers of America
- In office December 2, 1913 – December 11, 1924
- Preceded by: Edwin Perry
- Succeeded by: Thomas Kennedy

President pro tempore of the Ohio Senate
- In office January 6, 1913 – January 4, 1915

Member of the Ohio Senate from the 18th-19th district
- In office January 2, 1911 – January 4, 1915

Personal details
- Born: March 3, 1873 Coshocton, Ohio, U.S.
- Died: November 21, 1952 (aged 79) Coshocton, Ohio, U.S.
- Resting place: South Lawn Cemetery
- Party: Democratic
- Occupation: Labor leader, coal miner

William B. Green (March 3, 1873 – November 21, 1952) was an American trade union leader. Green is best remembered as the president of the American Federation of Labor (AFL) from 1924 to 1952. He was a strong supporter for labor-management co-operation and was on the frontline for wage and benefit protections and industrial unionism legislation.

As president of the AFL, he continued the development of the federation away from the foundations of "pure and simple unionism" to a more politically active "social reform unionism."

== Early life ==
Green was born March 3, 1873, in Coshocton, Ohio, the son of English and Welsh immigrants. His father was a coal miner. Green went to work himself in the coal mines in 1889, at 16.

== Union career ==
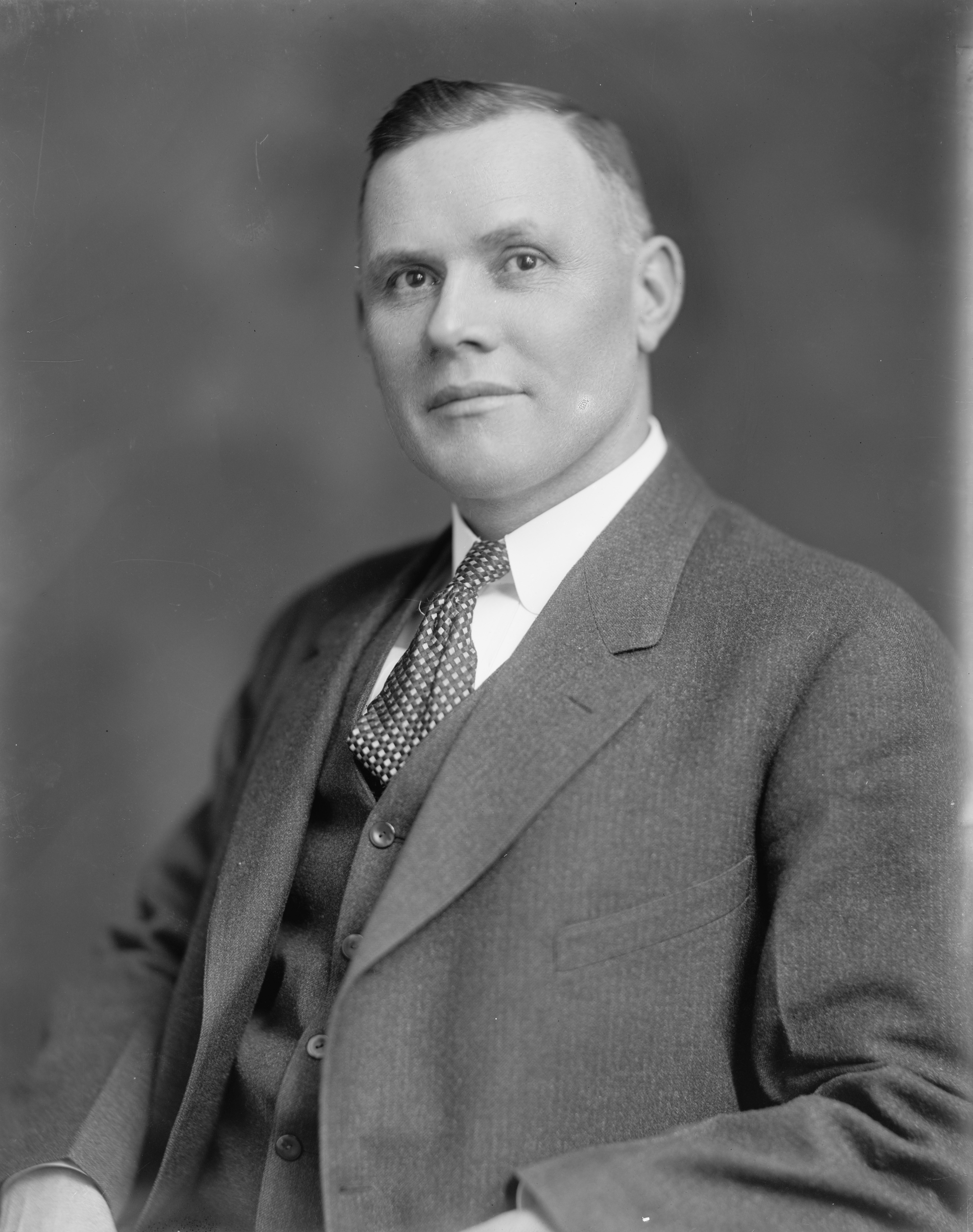
Portrait by Harris & Ewing c. 1910s

He became involved in the trade union movement as a young miner and was elected as secretary of the Coshocton Progressive Miners Union in 1891. The Coshocton Progressive Miners Union later became a local of the United Mine Workers of America (UMWA). In 1890, Green became the subdistrict president of the UMWA; he became UMWA Ohio district president in 1906.

In 1910, he was elected to the Ohio Senate, where he served as both Senate president pro tempore and Democratic floor leader. As Ohio state senator, Green drafted and secured passage of a model Workmen's Compensation Act in 1911. His accomplishments as state senator included Progressive Era legislation, including bills to limit the hours of women wage earners, institute a 1% income tax, elect Ohio's US senators by popular vote, and run judicial nonpartisan elections. Green's experience and accomplishments contributed to his appointment as the UMWA's international statistician in 1911 and then as promotion to secretary-treasurer in 1913. He was named to the AFL's Executive Council in 1914 and became Secretary-Treasurer in 1916. His intensive involvement in labor had him serve as one of five delegates to the Paris Peace Conference in 1918.

In 1924, he became president of the AFL following the death of Samuel Gompers, he held the position until his own death. In 1933, Green's endeavors persuaded President Franklin D. Roosevelt to appoint him to the Labor Advisory Council of the National Recovery Administration. The following year, Green served on the National Labor Board. Later, President Harry Truman appointed Green to the National Advisory Committee on Mobilization during the Korean War.

He is best remembered for having presided over the split in the AFL, which led to the founding of the Congress of Industrial Organizations (CIO).

== Strategy ==
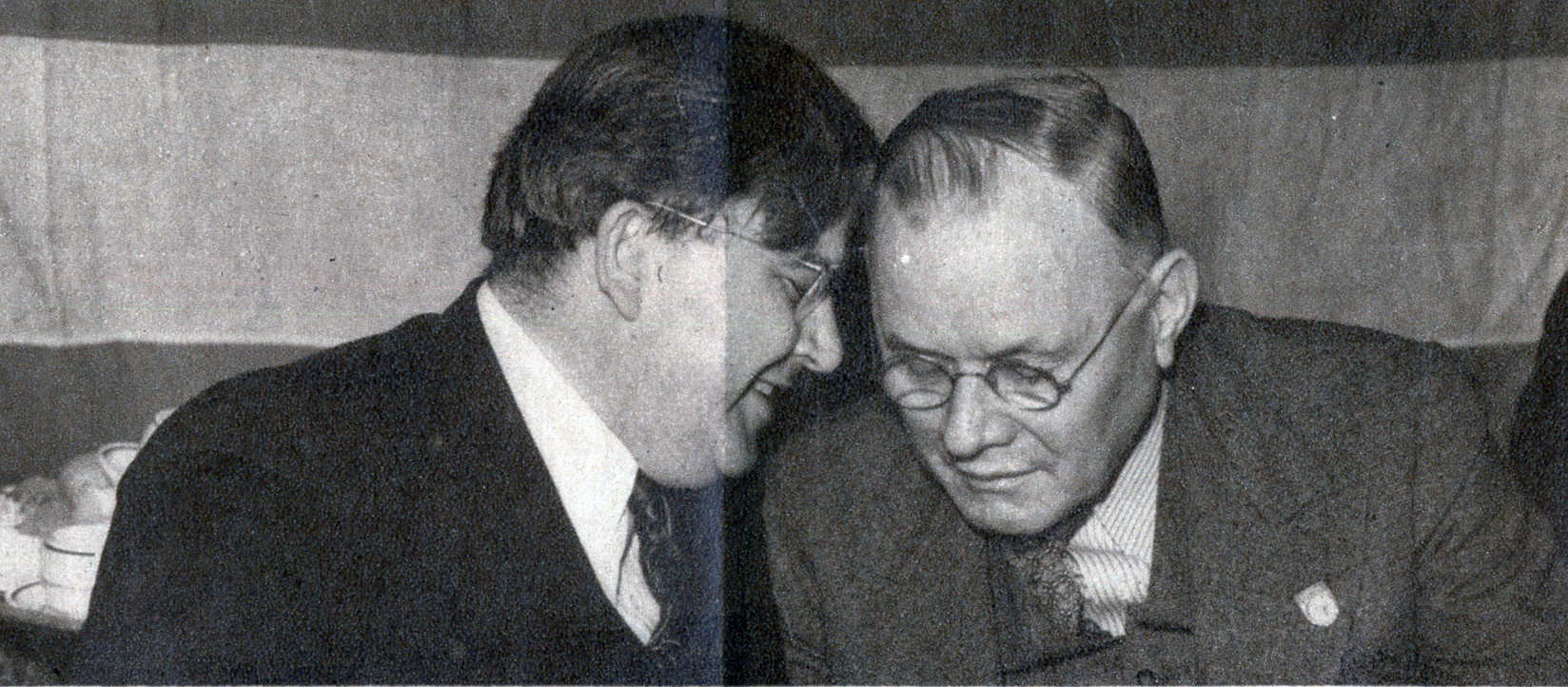
William Green (Right) with Illinois State Federation of Labor President Reuben Soderstrom, circa 1935

Under Green's presidency in the 1920s, the AFL changed its political strategy of confrontation to one of co-operation. Unlike Green, Gompers had frequently projected an independent and confrontational approach for the federation, despite his affiliation to the National Civic Federation and to the Wilson administration.

Green favored a more co-operative style for the labor movement. He won public support for legislating benefits for all workers and co-operated with employers in the name of mutual self-interest and the collective good. Green supported union-management co-operation in everyday functions at the workplace. He also supported reducing hours of labor, as it would increase the worker's living standards and participation for civic engagement. Ultimately, Green supported a voluntary incomes policy between labor and management, binding higher wages to productivity growth.

== Accomplishments ==
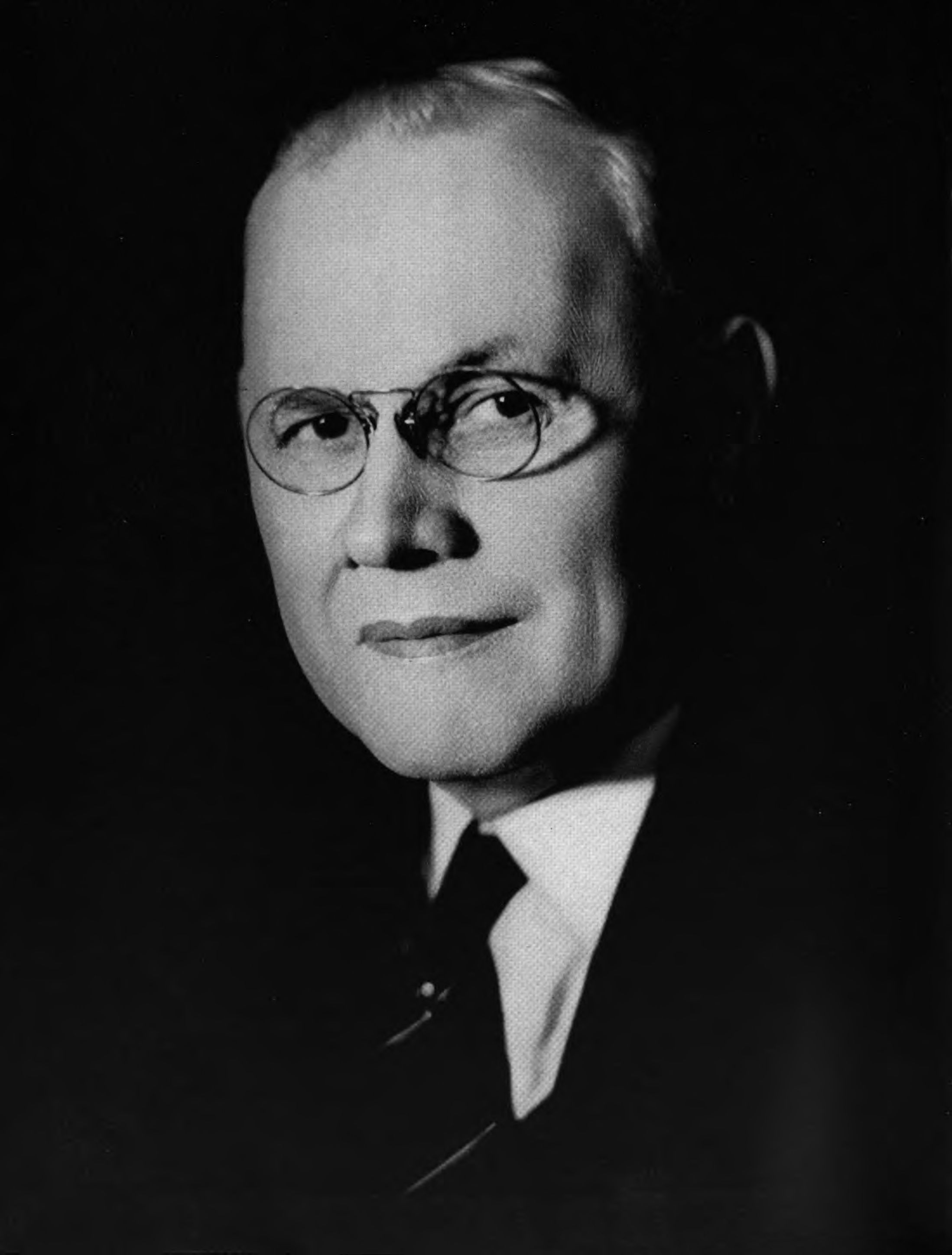
Green later in life

Green's support was critical to winning passage of the Norris-La Guardia Act of 1932, which reduced the practice of labor restrictions and banned the yellow-dog contract. Green was also successful in acquiring federation support for a national unemployment insurance system, sponsored largely by employer donations.

In 1935, Green facilitated the passage of the National Labor Relations Act, aimed at empowering workers' rights to organize and take part in collective bargaining. In 1938, Green helped pass the Fair Labor Standards Act, becoming the first federal law in instituting minimum wages and the 40-hour workweek.

== Death ==
Green died November 21, 1952, at 79 in Coshocton, Ohio. He was buried in South Lawn Cemetery.

== Legacy ==
Roosevelt University in Chicago, Illinois named its library after Green and colleague Philip Murray in the 1960s to distinguish the functions that unions played in the university's founding in 1945. The library honored their service in American labor and their contributions in funding educational opportunities for everyone. The Chicago Housing Authority named the William Green Homes public housing project after Green. The state of Ohio's Bureau of Workers' Compensation is located in the Willam Green Building, named after Green, in downtown Columbus, Ohio. He is a member of the Labor Hall of Fame.

== See also ==
- American Federation of Labor
- Norris-La Guardia Act
- National Labor Relations Act
- Fair Labor Standards Act
- George Meany, his successor at AFL
- Philip Murray CIO counterpart

Trade union offices
Preceded by Edwin Perry	Secretary-Treasurer of the United Mine Workers of America; 1913–1924	Succeeded by Thomas Kennedy
Preceded by Samuel Gompers	President of the American Federation of Labor; 1924–1952	Succeeded by George Meany
Preceded by Henry B. Perham	Fifth Vice-President of the American Federation of Labor; 1918–1919	Succeeded by William D. Mahon
Preceded by Frank Duffy	Fourth Vice-President of the American Federation of Labor; 1919–1924	Succeeded by Thomas A. Rickert
Preceded by Frank Duffy	Third Vice-President of the American Federation of Labor; 1924	Succeeded by Thomas A. Rickert
Ohio Senate
Preceded by Nation O. Mather	President of the Senate; 1911-1914	Succeeded by Charles John Howard
