= Edward J. Gainor =

President of the National Association of Letter Carriers
- Preceded by: William E. Kelly
- Succeeded by: William C. Doherty

Personal details
- Born: Edward Joseph Gainor; August 1, 1870 Greencastle, Indiana, U.S.
- Died: November 10, 1947 (aged 77)
- Profession: Labor unionist

Edward Joseph Gainor (August 1, 1870 – November 10, 1947) was an American labor unionist.

Born in Greencastle, Indiana, Gainor moved to Muncie, Indiana, working as a puddler and heater in a rolling mill. He joined the Amalgamated Association of Iron and Steel Workers, and served as secretary of his local from 1890 to 1892.

In 1897, Gainor left the mill, and became a letter carrier. He soon joined the National Association of Letter Carriers, and was elected to its executive in 1901. He became vice-president of the union in 1905, and then in 1914 was elected as president of the union.

In 1916, Gainor moved to Washington, D.C. In 1924, he represented the American Federation of Labor (AFL) at the British Trades Union Congress. He served as a vice-president of the AFL from 1935. Due to poor health, he retired from the Letter Carriers in 1941, and from the AFL in 1943.

Trade union offices
Preceded by William E. Kelly	President of the National Association of Letter Carriers; 1914–1941	Succeeded by William C. Doherty
Preceded by Peter S. Shaughnessy; Anthony Chlopek	American Federation of Labor delegate to the Trades Union Congress; 1924; With: P. J. Brady	Succeeded by Albert Adamski; Edward J. Evans
Preceded by Harry C. Bates	Fourteenth Vice-President of the American Federation of Labor; 1935–1936	Succeeded by George E. Browne
Preceded by John L. Lewis	Eleventh Vice-President of the American Federation of Labor; 1936–1941	Succeeded by Felix H. Knight
Preceded by Daniel J. Tobin	Ninth Vice-President of the American Federation of Labor; 1941–1942	Succeeded by William D. Mahon
Preceded by Harry C. Bates	Eighth Vice-President of the American Federation of Labor; 1942–1943	Succeeded by William D. Mahon
