= Felix H. Knight =

American labor union leader

Felix Harrison Knight (December 10, 1876 – October 13, 1952) was an American labor union leader.

Born in Montgomery County, Missouri, Knight worked for the St. Louis Street Railway, and joined the Amalgamated Association of Street, Electric Railway and Motor Coach Employees. He later moved to work on the Chicago, Burlington and Quincy Railroad, and in 1902 he joined the Brotherhood of Railway Carmen.

Knight quickly came to prominence in the Carmen's union; in the same year he joined, he was elected as financial secretary and chair and chair of his local board; and in 1903, as a delegate to the St. Louis Central Trades and Labor Union. In 1913, he was appointed as assistant general president of the carmen. From 1918 to 1920, he additionally served on the National Railroad Adjustment Board, and he was appointed again in 1934.

In 1935, Knight became president of the Carmen. He was also elected to the executive of the American Federation of Labor's (AFL) Railway Employes' Department, and in 1936, as a vice-president of the AFL. In that role, he worked on disputes with the Congress of Industrial Organizations, and in 1939, he was the AFL delegate to the British Trades Union Congress.

In 1946, Knight was appointed to an AFL committee investigating the labor movement in Argentina. He retired from his union posts in 1947, and died five years later.

Trade union offices
Preceded by Martin F. Ryan	President of the Brotherhood of Railway Carmen; 1935–1947	Succeeded by Irvin Barney
Preceded by Paddy Morrin; Daniel J. Tobin	American Federation of Labor delegate to the Trades Union Congress; 1939; With: James Maloney	Succeeded by Daniel J. Tobin
Preceded by Harry C. Bates	Thirteenth Vice-President of the American Federation of Labor; 1936–1941	Succeeded by Edward Flore
Preceded by Edward J. Gainor	Eleventh Vice-President of the American Federation of Labor; 1941–1942	Succeeded by Edward Flore
Preceded by William D. Mahon	Tenth Vice-President of the American Federation of Labor; 1942–1943	Succeeded by Edward Flore
Preceded by William D. Mahon	Ninth Vice-President of the American Federation of Labor; 1943–1947	Succeeded by William C. Doherty
