= James Maloney =

Jim or James Maloney may refer to:

== Politicians ==
- Jim Maloney (politician) (1901–1982), Australian Labor diplomat
- James Maloney (Ontario politician) (1905–1961), Canadian Member of Provincial Parliament
- James H. Maloney (born 1948), American congressman from Connecticut
- James Maloney (Canadian politician) (born 1964), Liberal Party member of House of Commons

== Sportsmen ==
- James W. Maloney (1909–1984), American racehorse trainer
- Jim Maloney (born 1940), American baseball pitcher
- James Maloney (rugby league) (born 1986), Australian five-eighth or halfback

== Others ==
- James Maloney (unionist) (1870–1960), American president of Glass Bottle Blowers' Association

== See also ==
- James Mahony (1810–1879), Irish artist and engraver
- James Moloney (born 1954), Australian children's author
- James Malone (disambiguation)
