= Edward Flore =

American labor unionist

Edward Frank Flore (December 5, 1877 – September 27, 1945) was an American labor unionist.

Born in Buffalo, New York, Flore worked in the saloon owned by his father from his teenage years. In 1900, he joined the Hotel and Restaurant Employees' International Alliance, holding various positions in his local, before in 1905 becoming vice-president of the international union. In 1909, he contested the presidency of the union, but lost and became a bartender once more. However, in 1911, he again stood for the presidency, this time successfully.

When Flore was elected president, he was only the second most powerful figure in the union, behind secretary-treasurer Jere L. Sullivan. However, Flore became increasingly unhappy with Sullivan's focus on organizing bartenders at the expense of other areas of the industry. In 1927, he formed a faction to challenge Sullivan. Sullivan died the following year, and Flore took the opportunity to reorganize the union, giving himself the greater share of power. To do so, he worked closely with West Coast locals, and focused on recruiting lower-paid workers in the industry, such as bellhops, maids and busboys. By 1940, the union's membership reached 200,000.

Flore was elected as a vice-president of the American Federation of Labor in 1936. He died in 1945, still in office.

Trade union offices
Preceded by T. J. Sullivan	President of the Hotel and Restaurant Employees' International Alliance; 1911–1945	Succeeded by Hugo Ernst
Preceded by Thomas E. Burke; Christian Madsen	American Federation of Labor delegate to the Trades Union Congress; 1934; With: Michael J. Colleran	Succeeded by Dennis Lane; Henry F. Schmal
Preceded by William D. Mahon	Fifteenth Vice-President of the American Federation of Labor; 1936–1941	Succeeded by William C. Birthright
Preceded by Felix H. Knight	Thirteenth Vice-President of the American Federation of Labor; 1941–1942	Succeeded by William C. Birthright
Preceded by Felix H. Knight	Eleventh Vice-President of the American Federation of Labor; 1942–1943	Succeeded by Harvey W. Brown
Preceded by Felix H. Knight	Tenth Vice-President of the American Federation of Labor; 1943–1945	Succeeded by William C. Birthright
