= Frank Farrington =

Frank Farrington may refer to:

- Frank Farrington (actor) (1873–1924), American silent film actor
- Frank Farrington (rugby league) (1926–2014), Australian rugby league player
- Frank Farrington (unionist) (1873–1939), American labor unionist
- Frank G. Farrington (1872–1933), American lawyer and politician from Maine
