= Gustave M. Bugniazet =

American labor union leader (1878–1960)

Gustave M. Bugniazet (December 21, 1878 – March 25, 1960) was an American labor union leader.

Born in New York City, Bugniazet became an electrician, and joined the International Brotherhood of Electrical Workers in 1902. In 1911, he was elected as vice president of the union, and then in 1925 as its international secretary. He also served as a vice-president of the American Federation of Labor (AFL). Bugniazet was a strong supporter of craft unionism, and when the Congress of Industrial Organizations split away, Bugniazet persuaded some other labor union leaders to remain with the AFL.

In 1947, Bugniazet left his union post, to become president of the American Standard Life Insurance Company. He held the post until 1954, when he retired.

Trade union offices
Preceded by Charles P. Ford	Secretary-Treasurer of the International Brotherhood of Electrical Workers; 1925–1947	Succeeded by J. Scott Milne
Preceded by Joseph N. Weber	Eighth Vice-President of the American Federation of Labor; 1931–1934	Succeeded by George McGregor Harrison
Preceded by Joseph N. Weber	Seventh Vice-President of the American Federation of Labor; 1934–1941	Succeeded by Daniel J. Tobin
Preceded by Arthur O. Wharton	Fifth Vice-President of the American Federation of Labor; 1941–1942	Succeeded by George McGregor Harrison
Preceded by Joseph N. Weber	Fourth Vice-President of the American Federation of Labor; 1942–1947	Succeeded by George McGregor Harrison
