= James Noonan =

James Noonan may refer to:

- James L. Noonan (1823–1898), Newfoundland politician
- James P. Noonan (1871–1929), American labor union leader
