= Pattern Makers' League of North America =

Labor union

- Abbreviation: PMLNA
- Merged into: International Association of Machinists and Aerospace Workers
- Formation: May 18, 1887
- Dissolved: October 1, 1991
- Type: Trade union
- Locations: Canada; United States
- Affiliations: AFL–CIO
- Formerly called: Pattern Makers' National League of North America

The Pattern Makers' League of North America (PMLNA) was a labor union representing patternmakers in the United States and Canada.

== History ==
The union was founded on May 18, 1887, in Philadelphia, as the Pattern Makers' National League of North America. It was chartered by the American Federation of Labor in 1894, and adopted its long-term name in 1898. By 1925, the union had 8,985 members.

In 1955, the union transferred to the new AFL–CIO, and by 1957, it had 15,000 members. However, membership in 1980 had fallen to only 9,600. On October 1, 1991, it merged into the International Association of Machinists.

== Presidents ==
1887: T. J. McGonnell
1892: Louis Kirberg
1894: Lewis R. Thomas
1902: James Wilson
1934: George Q. Lynch
1960: Gunnar Hallstrom
1972: Charles Romelfanger
1984: Jack L. Gabelhausen Sr.

== See also ==
- Pattern Makers League of North America v NLRB
