= Dave Beck =

American labor leader (1894–1993)

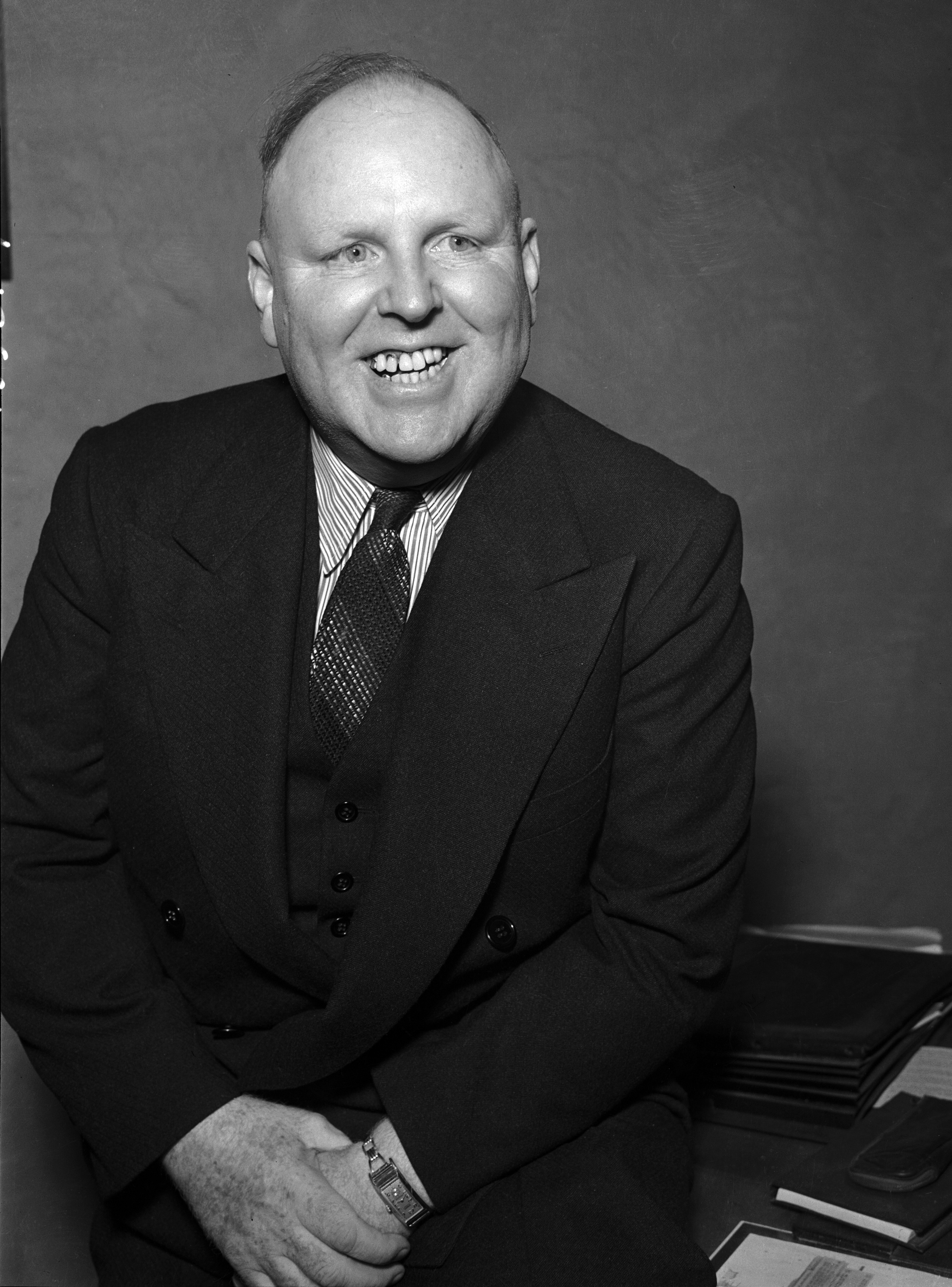
- Beck, 1925–1945
- Born: David Daniel Beck; June 16, 1894; Stockton, California, U.S.
- Died: December 26, 1993 (aged 99); Seattle, Washington, U.S.
- Occupation: Union leader
- Spouse: Dorothy Leschander (m. 1918; died 1961)
- Children: 1
- Parent(s): Lemuel Beck; Mary Tierney

David Daniel Beck (June 16, 1894 – December 26, 1993) was an American labor leader, and president of the International Brotherhood of Teamsters from 1952 to 1957. He helped found the "Conference" system of organization in the Teamsters union, and shot to national prominence in 1957 by repeatedly invoking his right against self-incrimination before a United States Senate committee investigating labor racketeering.

== Early life ==
David Daniel Beck was born in Stockton, California, to Lemuel and Mary (Tierney) Beck. His father was a carpet cleaner. The Becks moved to Seattle, Washington when Dave was 4 years old. He had one sibling, a younger sister named Reba, and his family was poor. He attended Broadway High School but was forced to quit at the age of 16 in order to go to work.

In 1910, Beck took a job as a laundry worker and joined his first labor union, the Laundry Workers' International Union, despite being just 16 years of age, securing a more lucrative position driving a laundry truck shortly thereafter. Following a short-lived strike in 1917, Beck helped to organize and establish Local 566 of the Teamsters Union.

He was drafted in World War I and served as a machinist’s mate and gunner in England with the United States Navy.

== West Coast Teamster career ==
After the war ended, Beck returned to Seattle and his job as a laundry truck driver. He became an organizer with the Teamsters. He successfully convinced hotels to contract only with unionized laundry services, which led laundry companies to unionize to win business. His subsequent rise in the Teamsters was quick: He was elected to the executive board of Local 566 in 1920, president of Joint Council 28 (which covered Seattle) in 1923, secretary-treasurer of Local 566 in 1925, and president of Local 566 in 1927. The same year he was elected president of his local, he was hired by the international union as a full-time organizer.

In 1937, Beck formed the Western Conference of Teamsters as a means of counteracting the conservative leadership of Joint Councils in San Francisco. Beck persuaded Teamsters president Daniel J. Tobin that the Western Conference of Teamsters was no threat to the power and authority of the international union. Harry Bridges, leader of the International Longshoremen's Association (ILA), had led a successful four-day strike in 1934. Bridges was now leading "the march inland"—an attempt to organize warehouse workers away from shipping ports. Beck was alarmed by Bridges' radical politics and worried that the ILA would encroach on Teamster jurisdictions. But Teamster joint councils in Los Angeles and other California ports seemed unconcerned. As an end run around the complacent joint councils, Beck formed a large regional organization. Beck engaged in fierce organizing battles and membership raids against the ILA, effectively stifling the "march inland." The Western Conference of Teamsters, and Beck, emerged significantly stronger from these battles.

== Presidential ambitions ==
As Beck's influence rose, Tobin attempted to check his growing power but failed. Beck was elected a vice-president of the Teamsters in 1940, and he began to challenge Tobin for control of the union. In 1947, Beck marshaled his forces and defeated a proposed dues increase to fund new organizing. In 1942, Beck began a six-year campaign to seize control of the International Teamster newsmagazine. He ousted its editor and won the executive board's approval to install his own man in the job in 1948. In 1946, Beck successfully campaigned to amend the union's constitution to create the post of executive vice-president. He subsequently won the 1947 election to fill the position.

In 1948, Beck essentially supplanted Tobin as the real power in the Teamsters union. On April 22, 1948, the Machinists (which was not a member of the American Federation of Labor, or AFL) struck Boeing in Seattle. On May 28, Beck announced that Teamsters would seek to organize the workers at Boeing, and formed Aeronautical Workers and Warehousemen Helpers Union Local 451 to raid the Machinists. Beck and Boeing officials made a secret agreement in which Boeing would hire members of Local 451—essentially hiring Teamsters as scabs and strikebreakers. After as many as a third of the Machinists had joined the Teamsters, the Machinists agreed to return to work without a contract. Beck's actions were nearly universally condemned by members of the AFL Executive Council. The AFL Executive Council met in August 1948 to take action against Beck. The day before the meeting, Tobin privately told associates that he would repudiate Beck. But at a secret meeting that afternoon, Beck and his followers on the West Coast confronted Tobin with a fait accompli: Beck had allied with his long-time enemy Jimmy Hoffa. He now had more than enough votes on the Teamsters executive board to overrule Tobin if he tried to fire Beck. At the AFL meeting the next day, Tobin was forced to defend Beck's actions. Unwilling to embarrass an AFL vice president and create a confrontation with the Teamsters, the AFL Executive Council condoned the Teamster raid on the Machinists.

Five months later, Beck won approval of a significant reform of the union's internal structure. Instead of the four divisions which existed under Tobin, Beck proposed 16 divisions organized around each of the major job categories in the union's membership. Although nearly 1,000 Teamster leaders attended the conference in which the restructuring was debated and approved, Tobin did not.

In 1951, Tobin's tenuous hold on the Teamsters was further exposed when Tom Hickey, reformist leader of the Teamsters in New York City, won election to the executive board. Tobin had needed Beck's support to prevent Hickey's election, and Beck refused to give it.

== Presidency ==
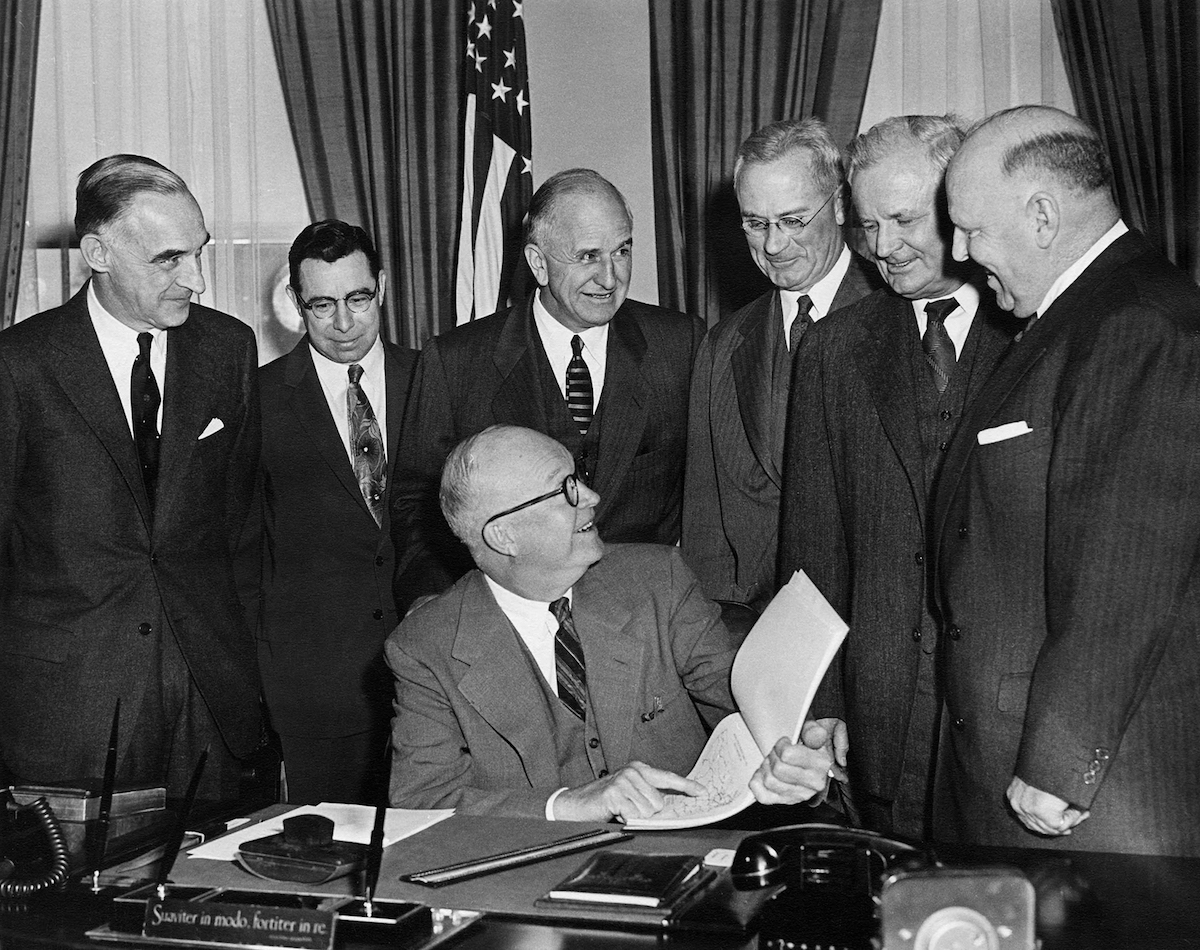
Beck (far right) with President Dwight D. Eisenhower in 1955.

On September 4, 1952, Tobin announced he would step down as president of the Teamsters at the end of his term. But as the mid-October Teamster convention neared, Tobin and his supporters formed a draft movement designed to subvert Beck's control of the delegates. Beck retaliated by publicly supporting the draft movement, but privately threatening to strip Tobin of his pension and benefits should he lose an election.

At the convention which opened on October 14, the 77-year-old Tobin was paid well to vacate the presidency. His pay was increased from $30,000 to $50,000 and the executive board was authorized to pay him this salary for life. Beck submitted a resolution asking Tobin to stay on as president, but forced Tobin to refuse. As further humiliation, Tobin nominated Beck for president. He was elected by acclamation. Beck pushed through a number of changes intended to make it harder for a challenger to build the necessary majority to unseat a president or reject his policies.

Beck was elected to the Executive Council of the AFL in 1953.

== Senate investigation and retirement ==
In 1957, Beck was called to testify before the United States Senate Select Committee on Improper Activities in Labor and Management, hiring Edward Bennett Williams as legal counsel. Harshly interrogated by committee counsel Robert F. Kennedy about $322,000 missing from the union treasury, Beck invoked his Fifth Amendment right against self-incrimination 117 times. Beck declined to seek reelection in 1957, and was succeeded by Jimmy Hoffa.

Beck was prosecuted for embezzlement and labor racketeering in 1959 in Washington state. He was convicted for pocketing $1,900 from the sale of a union-owned Cadillac. Beck was convicted later that year on federal charges of income-tax evasion. He appealed his convictions, and his sentence was reduced to three years. He entered prison in 1962. Beck, a former member of the Washington State Board of Prison Terms and Paroles, was himself paroled in 1965 after serving 30 months at McNeil Island Penitentiary. He was pardoned by Washington Governor Albert Rosellini in 1965, and by President Gerald Ford in 1975.

After his release from prison, Beck lived in a basement in a house he himself had built for his mother and sister in the 1940s. He retained his $50,000-a-year Teamster president's pension and became a multimillionaire investing in parking lots.

Beck died at the age of 99 in Northwest Hospital in Seattle on December 26, 1993 and is buried at Calvary Cemetery.

Trade union offices
Preceded by Daniel J. Tobin	President of the International Brotherhood of Teamsters; 1952–1957	Succeeded by James Riddle "Jimmy" Hoffa
Preceded by Patrick E. Gorman; Edward J. Volz	American Federation of Labor delegate to the Trades Union Congress; 1949; With: Harry C. Bates	Succeeded by J. P. McGurdy; Alex Rose
Preceded by James Petrillo	Thirteenth Vice-President of the American Federation of Labor; 1953–1954	Succeeded by Maurice Hutcheson
Preceded by James Petrillo	Twelfth Vice-President of the American Federation of Labor; 1954–1955	Succeeded by Federation merged
