= George McGregor Harrison =

American labor leader (1895-1968)

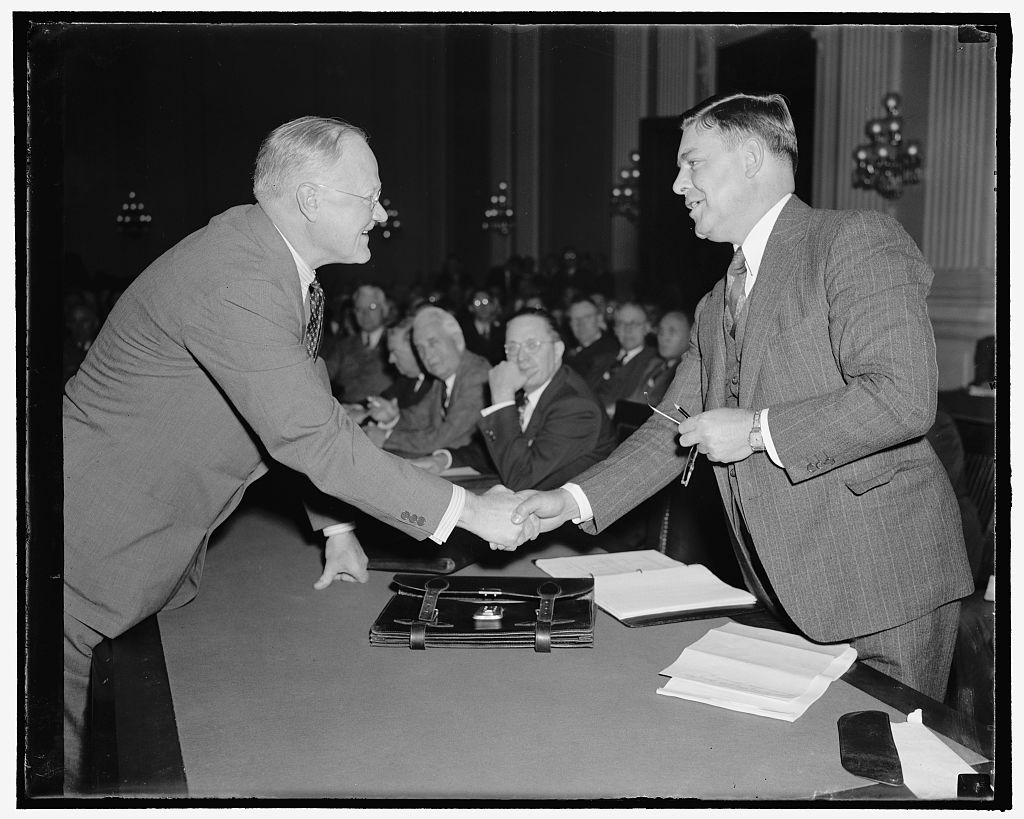
- Harrison (right) in 1938

Longest serving Grand President of the Brotherhood of Railway & Steamship Clerks, Freight Handlers, Express & Station Employes
- In office 1928–1963
- Preceded by: E. H. Fitzgerald
- Succeeded by: C. L. Dennis

Chief Executive of the Brotherhood of Railway & Steamship Clerks, Freight Handlers, Express & Station Employes
- In office 1963–1968

Personal details
- Born: George McGregor Harrison; July 19, 1895 Maries County, Missouri
- Died: November 30, 1968 (aged 73) Cincinnati, Ohio
- Party: Democratic
- Spouse: Averil Mayo Hughes
- Children: 3
- Occupation: Labor leader
- Known for: Labor movement

George McGregor Harrison (July 19, 1895 – November 30, 1968) was an American leader of organized labor who built the Brotherhood of Railway & Steamship Clerks, Freight Handlers, Express & Station Employes into one of the "largest and best-governed". labor unions in American history during his tenure. Throughout his thirty-five years as Grand President (1928–1963), the Harrison administration and the Brotherhood remained above "suspicion and reproach". He served as an advisor to five American presidents and played a pivotal role in drafting the first Social Security measure that was enacted by Congress.

== Early life ==
George Harrison was born in Maries County, Missouri, to Louis Harvey Harrison and Mary Logan Coppedge. One of nine children, his earliest days were spent milking cows and slopping hogs on the family farm. Sometime after 1900 the family abandoned farm life and moved to the nearby city of St. Louis. It's here that the Harrison family began a drayage company and a grocery store. Young George Harrison began working in the grocery store while the drayage company "had the contract to haul from the Anheuser-Busch glass works all the beer bottles used by the sprawling Anheuser-Busch Brewery".

With the drayage company mortgaged to provide security for the grocery store the Panic of 1907 led to the loss of both. George Harrison had just completed the sixth grade before being forced full-time into the workforce in the summer of 1907. At the age of 12 years old, he began to work in the wood car department of the American Car & Foundry Company. Shortly thereafter he lost the job as a result of his young age being discovered. He was forced to find another job, this time as a page at the Planter's Hotel, where he remained through 1908 with his wages helping to support the rest of the family.

In 1909 he returned to the world of the Railroad as a night-shift piecework checker once again at the American Car and Foundry Company before being promoted to an office boy in the steel car division and then finally he advanced to be a sub-storekeeper in the steel car plant.

Following his time at the ACF he moved to the American Refrigerator Transit Co where he held the following jobs: material checker, storekeeper, piecework timekeeper, master car builder car repairman, master car builder billing clerk, mechanical valuation accountant.

Throughout these early years, he was exposed to numerous roles and responsibilities which would aid and inform his labor perspectives. In 1918, George M. Harrison would help organize Victory Lodge No. 554 of the Brotherhood of Railway Clerks in St. Louis.

== Union Years ==
George M. Harrison was elected first local chairman of the grievance committee for the St. Louis lodge in what would become his first formal role.

He was later elected vice general chairman of the bargaining committee for the Brotherhood before becoming the general chairman in 1920 following the resignation of H.W. Schaeffer.

In 1922, at the 11th National Convention in Dallas, George M. Harrison began to make his voice heard in what would become a lifelong calling to stand up for the "little fellow" and advocate for those without a voice, insisting that "all classes of this organization" be given representation not just those with position and power. As a result, he was elected to his first term as vice grand president of the Brotherhood of Railway Clerks. He would remain in this role growing in respect amongst his follow railroad workers for his skillful negotiation.

At the 1928 Columbus convention E.H. Fitzgerald, the then current Grand President of the Brotherhood, decided to step down. There were many potential and able candidates who could succeed him in the role. And many were desirous to do so, but it was the rank and file of the Brotherhood whose desires mattered most. And their desires were for George M. Harrison, a man who had "never neglected their interests", to lead the Brotherhood. So on May 21, 1928, vice grand president Richard P. Dee nominated George M. Harrison. And, for the first time in the Brotherhood's history, a unanimous vote was cast followed by the declaration that George M. Harrison was the duly elected Grand President of the Brotherhood

George M. Harrison had risen from the bottom. He had cut his teeth organizing and negotiating at the local level. When he assumed the role of Grand President, he brought an optimistic conviction that the Brotherhood could develop into a strong international union that inspired others. "He proved an able, aggressive, but fair fighter for his organization and gained respect and admiration"

In 1934 he was elected Chairman of the top policy making board for railway labor unions: the Railway Labor Executive Committee. In that same year President Franklin Roosevelt appointed him to the Commission on Industrial analysis. He would also contribute heavily to the Railway Labor Act, the Washington Job Protection Agreement and in 1936 was an American delegate on the governing board of the International Labor Organization in Geneva, Switzerland.

== Leadership positions ==
- Vice President of the American Federation of Labor
- Member of the Executive Council and the Executive Committee of the AFL–CIO
- Chairman of the International Affairs Committee of the AFL–CIO
- Chairman of the Railway Labor Executives' Association
- U.S. Delegate to the United Nations

Trade union offices
Preceded by Gustave M. Bugniazet	Fifth Vice-President of the American Federation of Labor; 1942–1947	Succeeded by Daniel J. Tobin
Preceded by Gustave M. Bugniazet	Fourth Vice-President of the American Federation of Labor; 1947–1951	Succeeded by Daniel J. Tobin
Preceded by Joseph N. Weber	Third Vice-President of the American Federation of Labor; 1951–1953	Succeeded by Daniel J. Tobin
Preceded by Matthew Woll	Second Vice-President of the American Federation of Labor; 1953–1955	Succeeded by Federation merged
Preceded by Joseph D. Keenan; Walter P. Reuther	AFL-CIO delegate to the Trades Union Congress; 1958; With: Jacob Potofsky	Succeeded by Joseph A. Beirne; William C. Doherty
Preceded by David J. McDonald; Lee W. Minton	AFL-CIO delegate to the Trades Union Congress; 1961; With: Karl Feller	Succeeded by John M. Elliott; Jack Knight
