= Hugo Ernst =

Croatian-born American labor union leader (1876–1954)

Ernst c. 1926

Hugo Ernst (December 11, 1876 – July 22, 1954) was a Croatian-born American labor union leader.

== Biography ==
Born in Varaždin in Croatia, Ernst's father was the city's rabbi. Hugo studied journalism, and when he was 26, emigrated to New York City to become a reporter on a Croatian-language newspaper. When he asked for a pay rise, he was instead sacked, and became a bus boy. In 1904, he traveled to St Louis, to work as a waiter at the Louisiana Purchase Exposition. After the event, he moved to San Francisco, around which time, he joined local 30 of the Hotel and Restaurant Employees' International Alliance.

Ernst later became secretary of the local, which organized low-paid workers, and he became the leader of opposition to Jere L. Sullivan's craft unionism. In 1939, Ernst was elected as secretary-treasurer of the union, moving to Cincinnati to take up the post. He then took the top post, of president, in 1945, also become president of the American Federation of Labor's Employees Board. He also served as a vice-president of Americans for Democratic Action, and of the Labor League for Political Education. He died in 1954, still in office.

A street was named after Ernst in Holon, in Israel.

Trade union offices
Preceded by Edward Flore	President of the Hotel and Restaurant Employees' International Alliance; 1945–1954	Succeeded by Ed Miller
Preceded by Isidore Nagler; Harold D. Ulrich	American Federation of Labor delegate to the Trades Union Congress; 1944; With: Holt Ross	Succeeded by William C. Doherty; George Meany
