= Isidore Nagler =

American labor leader

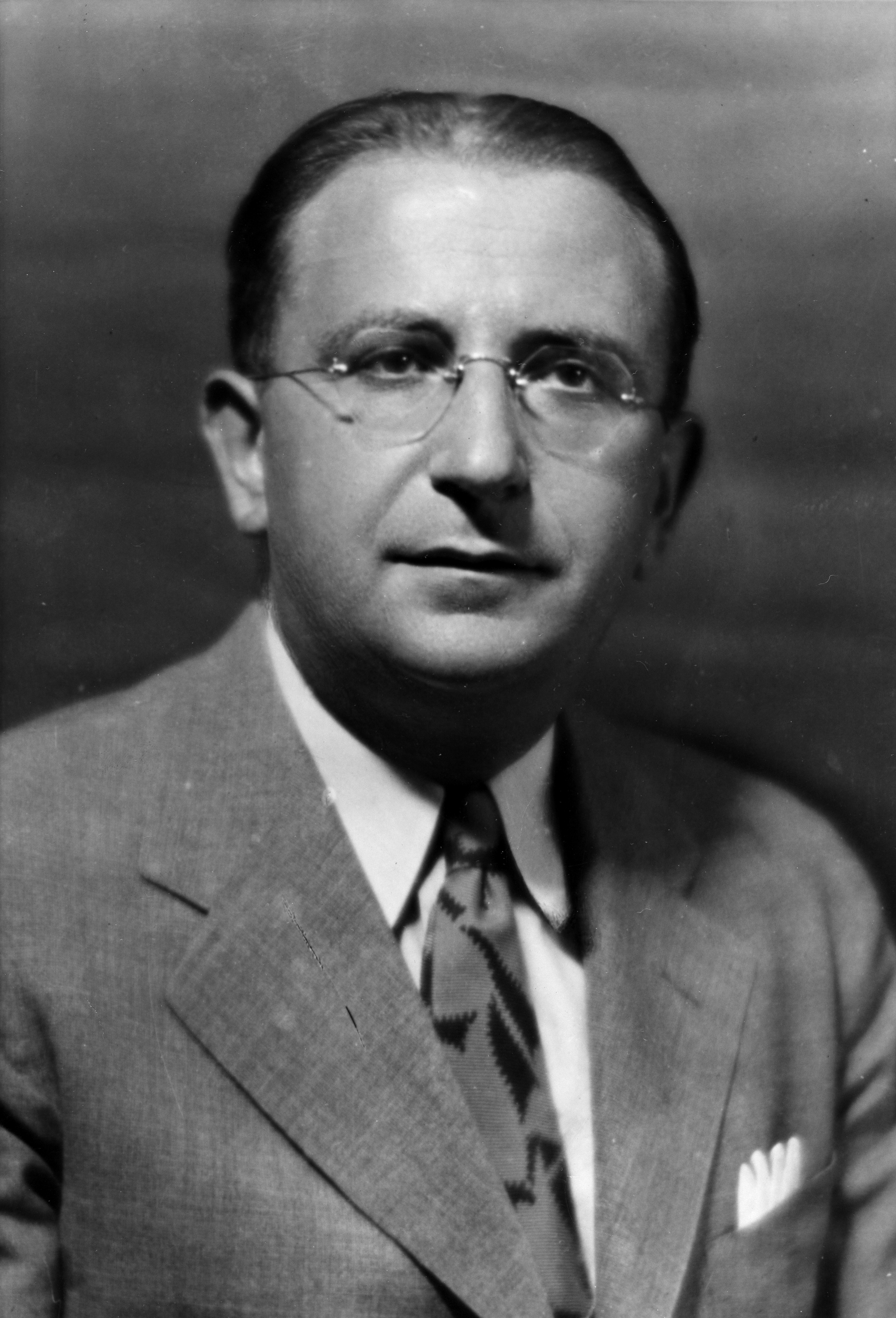
- Portrait by Blank & Stoller c. 1937

Vice President of the International Ladies Garment Workers Union
- In office December 11, 1929 – September 21, 1959
- President: Benjamin Schlesinger; David Dubinsky
- Preceded by: Multi-member position
- Succeeded by: Multi-member position

Personal details
- Born: February 25, 1895 Uście, Kingdom of Galicia and Lodomeria, Austro-Hungarian Empire (now Ustia, Ukraine)
- Died: September 21, 1959 (aged 64) New York City, New York, U.S.
- Party: American Labor; Liberal
- Occupation: Labor leader

Isidore Nagler (February 25, 1895 – September 21, 1959) was a Galician-born Jewish American labor leader who served as vice president of the International Ladies Garment Workers Union from 1929 until his death in 1959. He was a co-founder of the American Labor Party and the Liberal Party of New York.

== Biography ==
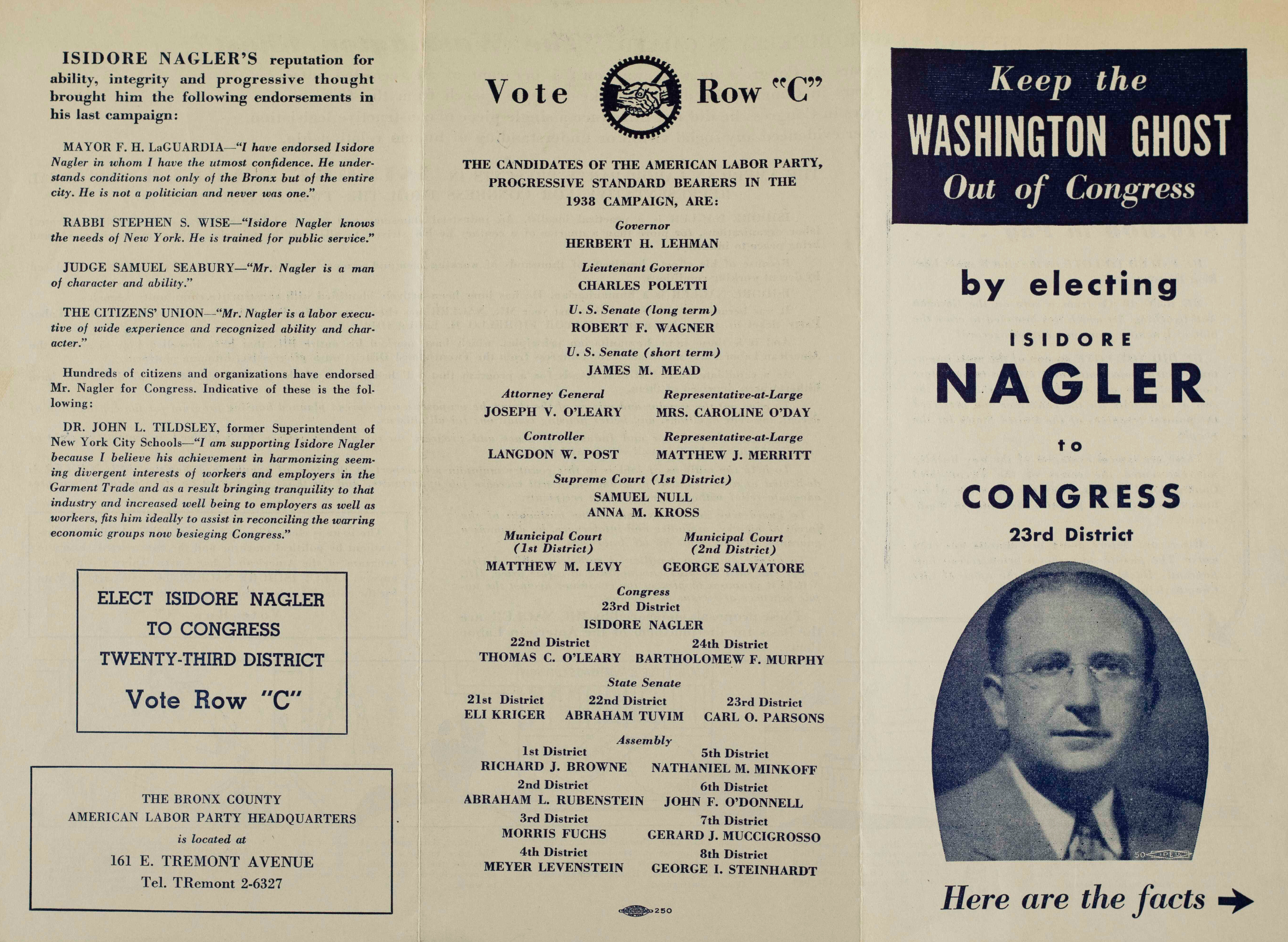
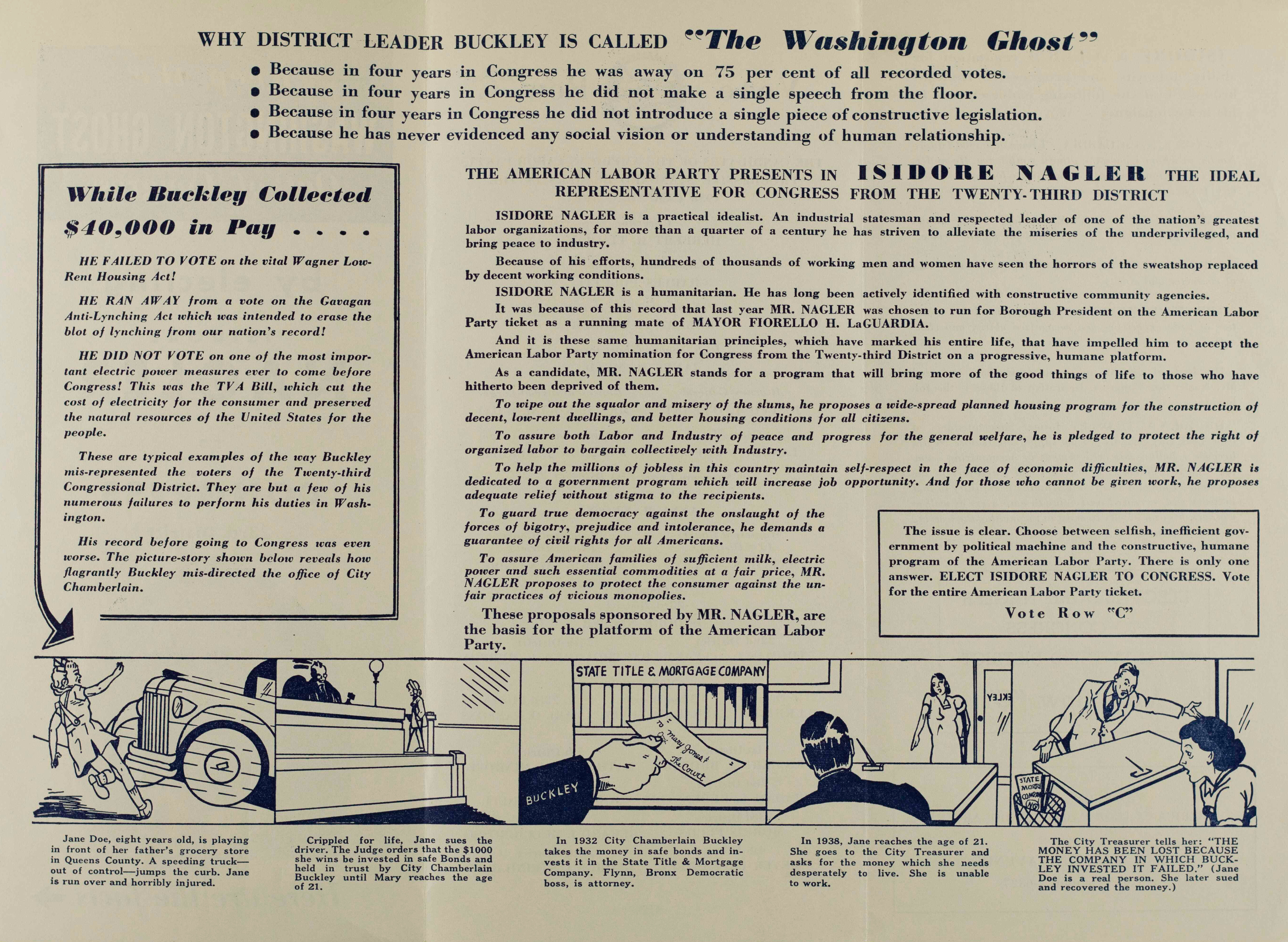
"Keep the Washington Ghost Out of Congress," a leaflet produced by the American Labor to promote Nagler's congressional candidacy, 1938

Nagler was born into a Jewish family in Uście, Austria-Hungary (now Ustia, Ukraine). Nagler emigrated to the United States in 1909, and worked in the clothing industry, joining Local 10 of the International Ladies Garment Workers' Union (ILGWU) in 1911. He soon rose to become business manager of the local, also serving on the New York Cloak Joint Board, and later becoming a vice president of the ILGWU. As leader of the New York cloak makers, he secured a 35-hour working week.

Nagler was a co-founder of the American Labor Party in 1936, and came up with its name. In 1937 he ran for Bronx Borough President on the ALP ticket, coming in second place with 39% of the vote. The next year, he ran for Congress in New York's 23rd congressional district, again taking second place with 28.4% of the vote. In 1958, he served as labor adviser to the United States delegation to the International Labour Organization conference. He was vice president of the New York State AFL-CIO.

Nagler was active in various Jewish organizations, becoming secretary of the Jewish Labor Committee and the Federation for Labor Israel.

Trade union offices
Preceded by Daniel J. Tobin	American Federation of Labor delegate to the Trades Union Congress; 1943; With: Harold D. Ulrich	Succeeded by Hugo Ernst; Holt Ross
