= John Coefield =

American labor union leader

John Coefield (June 18, 1869 – February 8, 1940) was an American labor union leader.

Born in Franklin, Pennsylvania, Coefield completed an apprenticeship as a plumber. He worked in various cities before settling in San Francisco, where he joined the Plumbers', Gas Fitters', and Steam Fitters' Association. In 1903, this union affiliated to the United Association of Journeymen Plumbers, Gas Fitters, Steam Fitters, and Steam Fitters' Helpers of the United States and Canada (UA).

In 1907, Coefield became business agent of the San Francisco Building Trades Council, and vice president of the California Building Trades Council. He became a vice-president of the UA in 1911, and then in 1919 became its president, relocating to Chicago. From 1920, he was also a vice-president of the Metal Trades Department, and in 1929, he became a vice-president of the American Federation of Labor.

Coefield was a supporter of the Republican Party and served as labor chair of the Republican National Committee on several occasions. He died suddenly in 1940, in New York City, after attending a dinner; when found, his body had been robbed.

Trade union offices
Preceded by John R. Alpine	President of the United Association of Journeymen Plumbers and Steam Fitters; 1919–1940	Succeeded by George Masterton
Preceded by Frank Farrington; William Hutcheson	American Federation of Labor delegate to the Trades Union Congress; 1927; With: Michael Casey	Succeeded by William B. Fitzgerald; Michael F. Greene
Preceded by James P. Noonan	Fifth Vice-President of the American Federation of Labor; 1931–1934	Succeeded by Arthur O. Wharton
Preceded by James Wilson	Fourth Vice-President of the American Federation of Labor; 1934–1940	Succeeded by Joseph N. Weber
