= International Union of Wood, Wire and Metal Lathers =

The International Union of Wood, Wire and Metal Lathers (WWML) was a labor union representing workers involved in erecting lath, plasterboard and flooring in the United States and Canada.

== History ==
The union was established on December 15, 1899, at a congress in Detroit, and it was chartered by the American Federation of Labor on January 15, 1900. It had 17,000 members by 1925. In 1955, it switched affiliation to the new AFL-CIO, and by 1957, it had 16,500 members. Membership in 1975 was slightly lower, at 14,428. On August 16, 1979, it merged into the United Brotherhood of Carpenters and Joiners of America.

== Presidents ==
1899: Edward J. Bracken
1900:
1903: J. E. Toale
1904: William J. McSorley
1926: John H. Bell
1929: William J. McSorley
1955: Lloyd A. Mashburn
1964: Sal Maso
1970: Robert Georgine
1971: Kenneth M. Edwards
1976: Charles Brodeur
