= John B. Haggerty =

American labour unionist (1884–1953)

John B. Haggerty (1884 – March 5, 1953) was an American labor unionist.

Born in St. Louis, Missouri, Haggerty completed an apprenticeship as a printer, then became a bookbinder. He joined the International Brotherhood of Bookbinders, and later served as president of his local union. He was elected as vice-president of the international union in 1915, and began working full-time for the union the following year.

In 1926, Haggerty was elected as president of the union. As leader of the union, he focused on maintaining good industrial relations, and frequently served as a mediator in disputes in other industries. He served on the American Federation of Labor (AFL)'s national legislative council and government employees council. In 1937, he was the AFL delegate to the British Trades Union Congress. He also served as an advisor to the National Recovery Administration, and during World War II on the labor advisor committee of the War Production Board. After the war, he chaired the board of governors of the International Allied Printing Trades Association.

Trade union offices
Preceded by William Glockling	President of the International Brotherhood of Bookbinders; 1926–1953	Succeeded by Robert E. Haskin
Preceded by Edward Canavan; William J. McSorley	American Federation of Labor delegate to the Trades Union Congress; 1937; With: William C. Birthright	Succeeded by Paddy Morrin; Daniel J. Tobin
