= William J. McSorley =

American labor union leader

William Joseph McSorley (December 13, 1876 – December 16, 1961) was an American labor union leader.

Born in Philadelphia, in 1899 McSorley was a founder of a local of the International Union of Wood, Wire and Metal Lathers. In 1904, he was elected as president of the international union. That year, he attended the convention of the American Federation of Labor, and he attended every subsequent one of its conferences, and those of the AFL-CIO until his death.

In 1905, McSorley was elected to the board of the Structural Building Trades Alliance. Two years later, he helped found the AFL Building Trades Department. In 1926, he left his post with the Lathers to become president of the Building Trades Department. In this role, he reorganized the Building Trades Council of Greater New York. He served until 1929, when he was re-elected as president of the Lathers.

McSorley also served as an AFL organizer in 1916, and served on the Committee on Labor of the Advisory Commission of the Council of National Defense. In 1955, he was an AFL delegate to the congress of the International Confederation of Free Trade Unions. That year, he retired from his union posts.

McSorley's son, also William J. McSorley, became a prominent labor unionist, serving as assistant to the president of the Building Trades Department.

Trade union offices
Preceded by J. E. Toale	President of the International Union of Wood, Wire and Metal Lathers; 1904–1926	Succeeded by John H. Bell
Preceded by George F. Hendrick	President of the Building Trades Department; 1926–1930	Succeeded by Michael McDonough
Preceded by John H. Bell	President of the International Union of Wood, Wire and Metal Lathers; 1929–1955	Succeeded by Lloyd A. Mashburn
Preceded by Dennis Lane; Henry F. Schmal	American Federation of Labor delegate to the Trades Union Congress; 1936; With: Edward Canavan	Succeeded by William C. Birthright; John B. Haggerty
