= Joseph N. Weber =

Hungarian-American Trade unionist (1865-1950

Joseph Nicholas Weber (June 21, 1865 – December 12, 1950) was a Hungarian-born American musician and labor union leader.

Born in Timișoara in the Austrian Empire, Weber emigrated with his family to the United States at the age of 14. They settled in New York City, where Weber played the clarinet, learning from his father, who was a bandleader. Joseph later traveled the country, performing with various touring bands. In 1890, while based in Denver, he formed a local of the National League of Musicians, becoming its secretary. He was a delegate to the union's national conference in 1891, at which he argued that it should affiliate to the American Federation of Labor (AFL).

Weber moved to Seattle in 1893, and Cincinnati in 1895, maintaining his union activity. In Cincinnati, he was elected to the executive of the union, but the following year, he was part of the split which formed the American Federation of Musicians (AFM). In 1900, he was elected as its president, on the recommendation of its founding president, Owen Miller.

Weber opposed African Americans holding membership of the union. He soon realized that the union would be weakened without their involvement, but he created parallel locals for black and white musicians. He led opposition to the use of mechanical instruments, or those which could replace multiple musicians, such as Wurlitzer organs, and argued that film talkies were a passing fad.

Weber stood down as president of the AFM in 1914, due to illness, but he was re-elected to it the following year. In 1929, he was elected as a vice-president of the AFL. He retired as president of the union 1940, but remained on the AFL executive until his death, ten years later.

Trade union offices
| Preceded by Owen Miller | President of the American Federation of Musicians; 1900–1914 | Succeeded by Frank Carothers |
| Preceded by Frank Carothers | President of the American Federation of Musicians; 1915–1940 | Succeeded by James C. Petrillo |
| Preceded by Arthur O. Wharton | Seventh Vice-President of the American Federation of Labor; 1931–1934 | Succeeded by Gustave M. Bugniazet |
| Preceded by Arthur O. Wharton | Sixth Vice-President of the American Federation of Labor; 1934–1941 | Succeeded by George McGregor Harrison |
| Preceded by John Coefield | Fourth Vice-President of the American Federation of Labor; 1941–1942 | Succeeded by Gustave M. Bugniazet |
| Preceded by Matthew Woll | Third Vice-President of the American Federation of Labor; 1942–1950 | Succeeded by George McGregor Harrison |
