= Holt Ross =

Holt Edgar Ross (1897 – August 4, 1968) was an American labor unionist.

Born in Stonewall, Mississippi, Ross served in World War I, then joined the fire department in Laurel, Mississippi and became fire chief. In 1920, he was elected as president of the Mississippi Federation of Labor. He studied at Cumberland University, and then practiced law from 1924. In 1933, he left to work full-time in the labor movement, becoming the southern representative of the International Hod Carriers, Building and Common Laborers' Union. He also became the president of the Mississippi Federation of Labor. He was also a conciliator and councilor for the AFL-CIO.

Trade union offices
Preceded by Isidore Nagler; Harold D. Ulrich	American Federation of Labor delegate to the Trades Union Congress; 1944; With: Hugo Ernst	Succeeded by William C. Doherty; George Meany
