= Karl Feller =

American labor unionist

Karl Feller (August 6, 1914 – February 5, 1981) was an American trade unionist. He was president of the International Union of United Brewery, Flour, Cereal, Soft Drink and Distillery Workers.

During his 1959 visit to the United States, Nikita Khrushchev had the following exchange with Feller:

Feller: "Mr. Chairman, I cannot understand, since the Communist Party proclaims itself to be the liberator of the working class, yet we see a mass exodus of workers in other countries following the Communist seizure of power. You have the example of three million workers fleeing from East Germany to West Berlin, and about three million fleeing from North Korea to South Korea and, as mentioned a moment ago, three hundred or so thousands of Hungarians braved arrest and death in escaping to freedom. Mr. Khrushchev, can you tell us of a single instance where, following Communist seizure of power, there has been a mass influx of workers from surrounding non-Communist countries into the Communist country? If the Communist Party is the liberator of the working class, why don't we see this phenomenon?"

Khrushchev: "Is that all? Think it over. Drink your beer. Perhaps that will help you to find the answer to your question."

Feller: "That certainly is no answer, and apparently nothing will make you understand why millions want to escape from Communism-"

Khrushchev: "I've told you, I'm not even afraid of the devil."(1)

Despite his anti-communism, Feller's work landed him on the master list of Nixon political opponents.

Trade union offices
Preceded by New position	President of the International Union of United Brewery, Flour, Cereal, Soft Drink and Distillery Workers; 1949–1973	Succeeded by Union merged
Preceded by David J. McDonald; Lee W. Minton	AFL-CIO delegate to the Trades Union Congress; 1961; With: George McGregor Harrison	Succeeded by John M. Elliott; Jack Knight
