= Edward J. Evans =

American labor unionist

Edward Joseph Evans (April 20, 1871 – July 23, 1928) was an American labor unionist.

Born in Chicago, Evans became an electrician and joined the International Brotherhood of Electrical Workers, rising to become international vice-president of the union. He was regarded as being on the right wing of the union movement. He championed technical education, and founded a union school for apprentices. He spoke out against Fordism and the specialization of work.

Evans supported William Emmett Dever's successful campaign to become Mayor of Chicago, and was then appointed as the city's civil service commissioner. He regularly acted as a mediator for the American Federation of Labor in railroad and building trade disputes, and was the federation's delegate to the British Trades Union Congress in 1925.

Trade union offices
Preceded by Peter J. Brady; Edward J. Gainor	American Federation of Labor delegate to the Trades Union Congress; 1925; With: Albert Adamski	Succeeded by Frank Farrington; William Hutcheson
