= Brotherhood of Railway Carmen =

American trade union and fraternal benefit society

Brotherhood Railway Carmen of America
- Early emblem of the Brotherhood Railway Carmen of America, dating back to the 19th Century.
- Merged into: Transportation Communications International Union
- Formation: September 9, 1890; 135 years ago
- Founded at: Topeka, Kansas
- Dissolved: 1986
- Merger of: Carmen's Mutual Aid Association and Brotherhood of Railway Car Repairers of North America
- Purpose: Fraternal benefit society and trade union for railroad employees involved in the repair and inspection of railroad cars.

The Brotherhood Railway Carmen of America, commonly known as the Brotherhood of Railway Carmen (BRC), was a fraternal benefit society and trade union established in the United States of America. The BRC united railroad employees involved in the repair and inspection of railroad cars to advance their common interests in the realm of hours of work, wages, and working conditions.

The organization traces its genesis to a seven-member group called the Brotherhood of Railway Car Repairers of North America founded late in October 1888 in a railway car in Iowa. This group merged with a rival organization, the Carmen's Mutual Aid Association at a "Joint Convention" held in Topeka, Kansas in September 1890, formally establishing the organization and its bylaws and electing its officers under the new permanent name.

The BRC was disestablished through merger into the Transportation Communications International Union (TCU) in 1986, which was in turn amalgamated into the International Association of Machinists (IAM) in a merger completed in 2012.

== Organizational history ==
=== Background ===
One of the largest industries of the 19th century in the United States revolved around the nation's rapidly growing network of railways — transportation lines which moved millions of passengers and billions of dollars in raw and finished products from place to place. Workers in the industry frequently suffered from low pay, long hours of labor, job insecurity, and dangerous working conditions. Prior to the end of the 1870s, little existed in the way of collective organization of railway workers, with only the elite railway conductors and railroad engineers organized to any significant extent, and these on a strictly defined craft basis.

Other less skilled crafts were slower to organize, led by the Brotherhood of Locomotive Firemen (B of LF) in December 1873. Those who repaired and inspected railroad cars were left to their own devices and suffered accordingly, with wages for car repairers running from 10 cents to 15 cents per hour and salaries of car inspectors topping out at a paltry $45 per month. Moreover, even these low wages were insecure, with car repair shops typically placed under the supervision of a master mechanic and foremen working for him, who capriciously hired and fired at will and sometimes extorted gifts from workers to maintain the supervisor's good will.

A general sentiment favoring labor organization percolated through the car repair shops, although prior to 1888 no concrete organization was in the field.

=== Establishment ===
Frank L. Ronemus, Sr. (1859-1920), a founder and head of the Brotherhood of Railway Carmen.

Two brothers who were each car repairers provided the volition for organization of the Brotherhood of Railway Carmen. William H. Ronemus and Frank L. Ronemus had throughout the 1880s discussed the idea of bringing railway car repairers and inspectors into a formal organization. On the night of October 27, 1888, they gathered with five other inspectors in a combined baggage and smoking car on a shop track owned by the Burlington, Cedar Rapids & Northern Railway at Cedar Rapids, Iowa to formalize their plans.

The new organization was initially known as the Brotherhood of Railway Car Repairers of North America. William Ronemus, a repairer on the Chicago, Rock Island & Pacific Railroad at Wilton Junction, Iowa was head of the fledgling organization.

A "Joint Convention" was held in Topeka, Kansas on September 9, 1890, with the Brotherhood of Railway Car Repairers merging at that time with the Carmen's Mutual Aid Association, a small parallel organization which had been established in Minneapolis, Minnesota by Sylvester Keliher. The organization resulting from this amalgamation took the new name Brotherhood Railway Carmen of America.

The delegates drafted the organization's first declaration of principles, emphasizing the fraternal benefit aspect and committing the organization to "promote Friendship, Unity, and True Brotherly love among its members," to "exalt the character and increase the efficiency of carmen" and to thereby "benefit our employers by raising the standard of our craft." At this same convention, the delegates elected William Ronemus as Grand Chief Carman of the unified organization and Keliher the group's Grand Secretary and Treasurer.

=== Activities during the 1930s ===
The Brotherhood of Railway Carmen's objects in the 1930s included "to advance the moral, material, and industrial well-being of its members" and "to secure for our members a just remuneration in exchange for their labor... to shorten the hours of labor as economic development and progress will warrant, eight hours per day is the workday desired, and 44 hours per week, in order that our members may have more opportunities for intellectual development, social enjoyment, and industrial education."

Their main achievement during this era was the amendment of the Railway Retirement Act of 1937, which was signed by President Roosevelt and established a railroad retirement system, separate from the social security program. This act provided an increase in wage of $0.05 an hour, and restored pay rates on Canadian railroads, among other favorable changes.

=== Merger with the Transportation Communications International Union ===
The union has merged with other railway unions several times. The Brotherhood of Railway Carmen is a division of the Transportation Communications Union. In 1986, the Brotherhood of Railway Carmen voted to merge with the Transportation Communications International Union and members of this craft in present-day are considered a part of the Transportation Communications International Union's Carmen Division, which operates by its own bylaws. The most recent merger occurred on January 1, 2012, in which the Transportation Communications International Union merged with the International Association of Machinists (IAM).

== Grand Chief Carmen ==
Those holding the top position of "Grand Chief Carman" (later known as General President) included:

1888: William H. Ronemus
1891: W. S. Missemer
1894: F. A. Symonds
1896: William H. Ronemus
1901: Joseph B. Yeager
1903: Frank L. Ronemus
1909: Martin F. Ryan
1935: Felix H. Knight
1947: Irvin Barney
1950s: A. J. Bernhardt
1966: George O'Brien
Orville W. Jacobson
1983: Charles E. Wheeler
