= James Wilson (unionist) =

James Adair Wilson (April 23, 1876 – September 3, 1945) was an American labor union leader.

Born in Erie, Pennsylvania, Wilson trained as a patternmaker. In 1898, he joined the Pattern Makers' League of North America, and he was elected as its president in 1902. In order to take up the post, he moved to New York City, then in 1906, moved to Cincinnati.

During World War I, Wilson traveled to Europe twice on labor missions. He served on the War Labor Board, and was an alternate on the National Mediation Board. In 1924, he was elected as a vice president of the American Federation of Labor.

Wilson left his labor union posts in 1934, to become a labor counselor at the International Labour Organization in Geneva. He died in 1945.

Trade union offices
| Preceded by Lewis R. Thomas | President of the Pattern Makers' League of North America; 1902–1934 | Succeeded by George Q. Lynch |
| Preceded by John A. Moffit; James Wood | American Federation of Labor delegate to the Trades Union Congress; 1906; With: Frank Keyes Foster | Succeeded by John T. Dempsey; William E. Klapetzky |
| Preceded by Martin Francis Ryan | Fifth Vice-President of the American Federation of Labor; 1929–1930 | Succeeded by James P. Noonan |
| Preceded by Matthew Woll | Fourth Vice-President of the American Federation of Labor; 1930–1934 | Succeeded by John Coefield |
