= Paddy Morrin =

American labor union leader (1879–1951)

Paul J. "Paddy" Morrin (August 21, 1879 – August 24, 1951) was an American labor union leader.

Born in Williamsburg, Iowa, Morrin began working when he was 12 years old. In 1897, he became a structural and ornamental iron worker, moving to St. Louis, Missouri. He joined the International Association of Bridge and Structural Iron Workers, and in 1909 was elected as president of his local union, becoming a business agent in 1910. In 1913, he was elected as vice-president of the international union, serving for one year.

Morrin became general organizer of the international union in 1917, and was elected as president in 1918. Under his leadership, membership of the union grew from 18,000 to 100,000. He was also active in the St. Louis Trades Council Union, editing its newspaper from 1917 until 1941. He retired as president at the start of 1949, and was granted a salary of $25,000 a year and use of a personal automobile, in exchange for providing advice on request.

Trade union offices
Preceded by Joseph E. McClory	President of the International Association of Bridge, Structural, and Ornamental Iron Workers; 1918–1949	Succeeded by Jack Lyons
Preceded by William C. Birthright; John B. Haggerty	American Federation of Labor delegate to the Trades Union Congress; 1938; With: Daniel J. Tobin	Succeeded by Felix H. Knight; James Maloney
