= Martin Francis Ryan =

American labor union leader

Martin Francis Ryan (October 23, 1874 – January 17, 1935) was an American labor union leader.

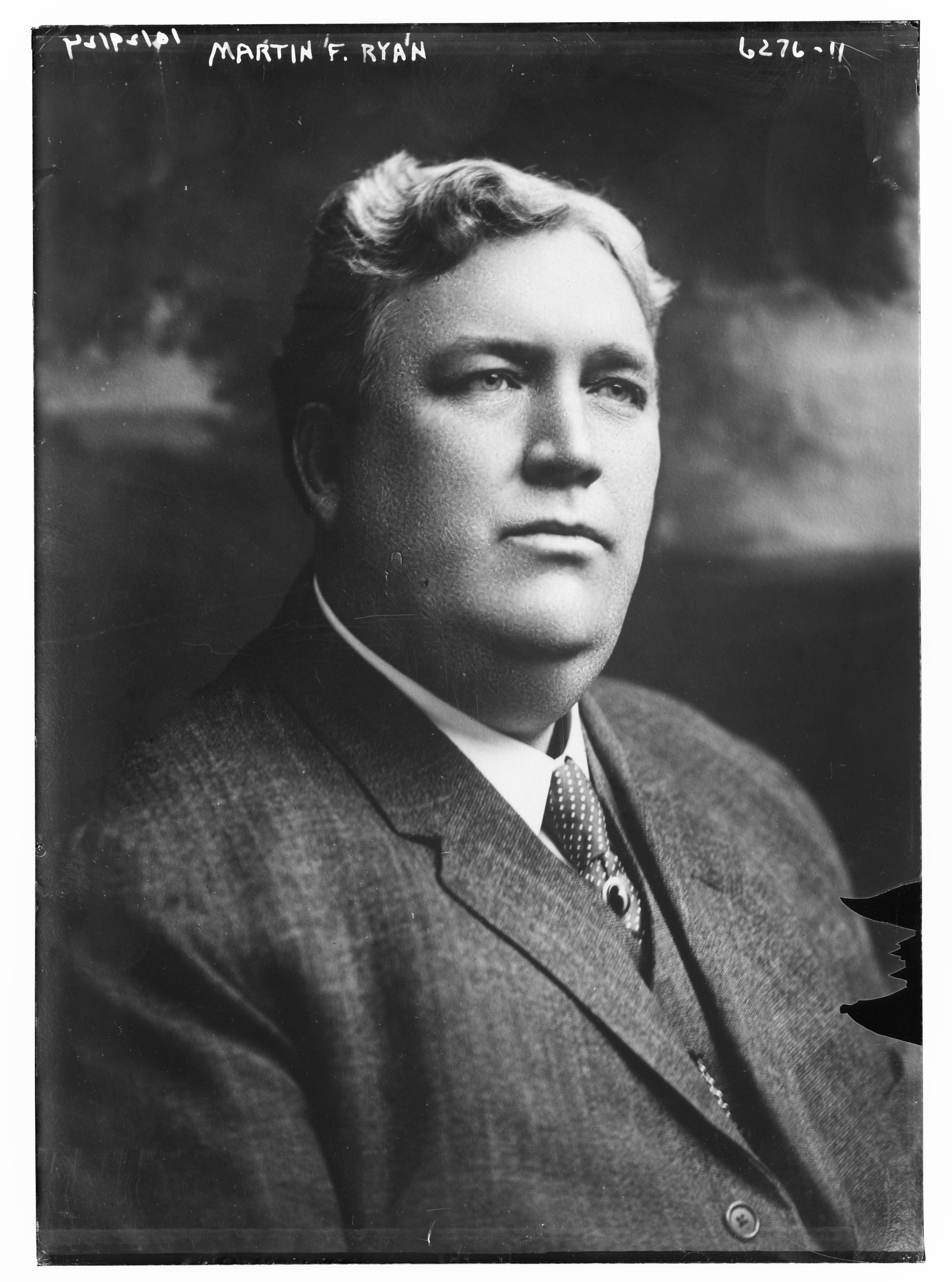
Martin Francis Ryan

Born in Coldwater, West Virginia, Ryan began working on the railroad as soon as he left school, and moved to Beaumont, Texas when he was eighteen. In 1899, he joined the Brotherhood of Railway Carmen of America, and in 1903 was elected to its executive. In 1905, he was elected as the union's vice-grand chief carman, then in 1909 as its general president. In 1918, Woodrow Wilson appointed him as a member of the First Labor Mission to Great Britain and France, and in 1924 he was a delegate to the congress of the Pan-American Federation of Labor.

In 1923, Ryan was elected as a vice-president of the American Federation of Labor, then in 1929 as the federation's treasurer. From 1928, he was also treasurer of the Railway Labor Executives' Association, and in 1927 he was the founding treasurer of the Union Labor Life Insurance Company.

Ryan died in 1935, while still in office.

Trade union offices
Preceded by Frank L. Ronemus	President of the Brotherhood of Railway Carmen; 1909–1935	Succeeded by Felix H. Knight
Preceded by Matthew Woll	Vice-President of the American Federation of Labor; 1919–1929	Succeeded by James Wilson
Preceded by Daniel J. Tobin	Treasurer of the American Federation of Labor; 1929–1935	Succeeded by Frank Morrison as Secretary-Treasurer
