= Anthony Chlopek =

American labor union leader (1880–1937)

Anthony John Chlopek (June 10, 1880 – November 16, 1937) was an American labor union leader.

Born in Toledo, Ohio, Chlopek became a longshoreman when he was fifteen, and four years later, he joined the International Longshoremen's Association (ILA). He undertook a wide variety of work, but remained a union member. In 1909, he was elected as vice-president of the ILA, then in 1921, he became the union's president.

In 1927, Chlopek stood down as union president, to become the ILA's legislative representative, serving until 1931. He died six years later.

Trade union offices
Preceded by Thomas V. O'Connor	President of the International Longshoremen's Association; 1921–1927	Succeeded by Joseph P. Ryan
Preceded by Edward J. McGivern; Benjamin Schlesinger	American Federation of Labor delegate to the Trades Union Congress; 1923; With: Peter S. Shaughnessy	Succeeded by Peter J. Brady; Edward J. Gainor
