= Arthur O. Wharton =

American labor union leader

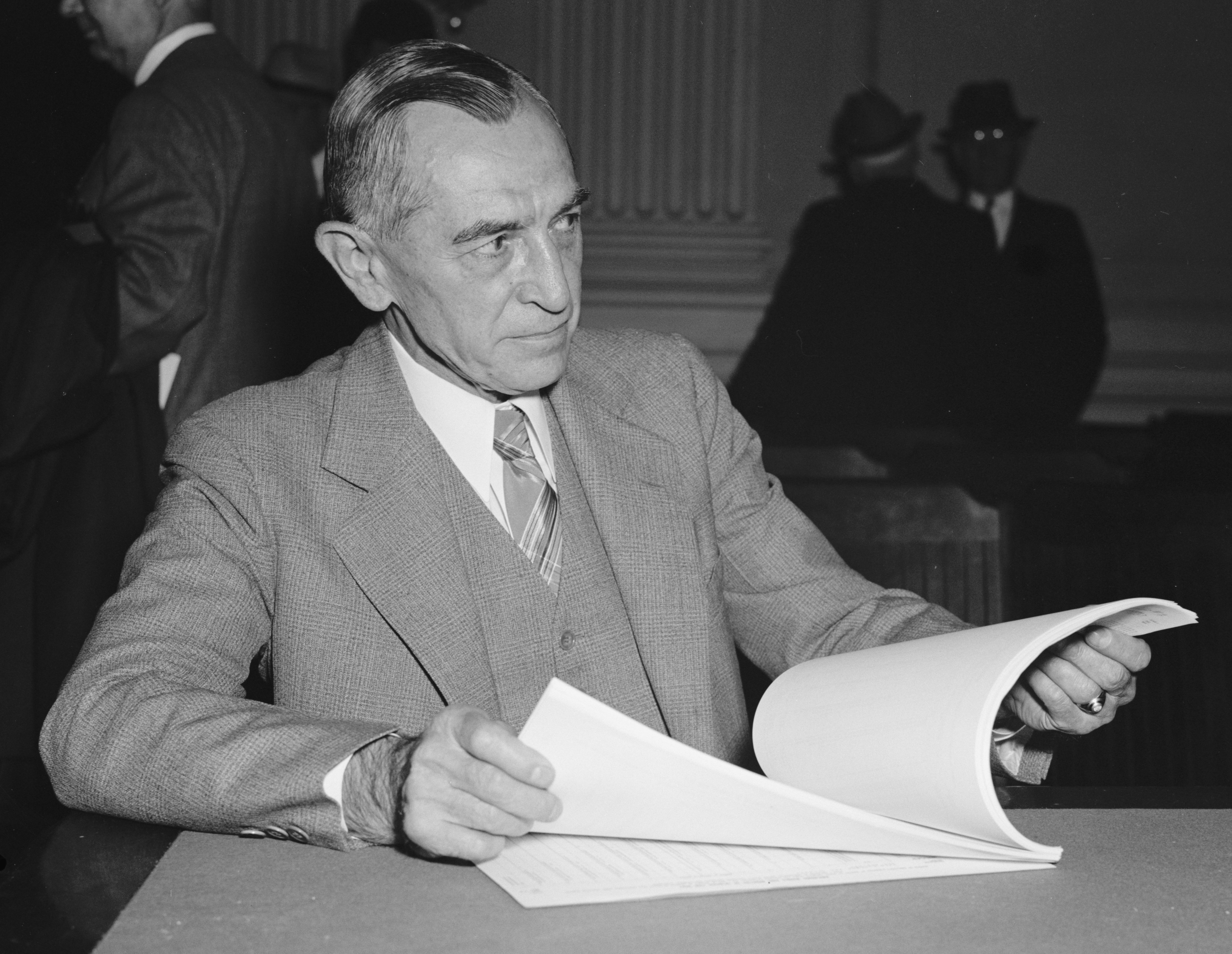
- Born: Arthur Orlando Wharton; November 9, 1873; Topeka, Kansas
- Died: December 21, 1944 (aged 71); Tucson, Arizona
- Occupation: Labor leader
- Spouse: Celeste Ayers Wharton

Arthur Orlando Wharton (November 9, 1873 – December 21, 1944) was an American labor union leader.

== Biography ==
Wharton was born in Kansas, near Topeka. When he was six years old, his father died in a blizzard. Arthur began working at the age of thirteen, undertaking an apprenticeship as a machinist with the Atchison, Topeka, and Santa Fe Railway. He rose to become a foreman in Osawatomie, Kansas, then moved to St. Louis.

Wharton was active in the International Association of Machinists, and became a business agent of his local in 1903. From 1908, he also served as secretary-treasurer of the union's Southwestern Consolidated Railway District. In 1915, he was elected as president of the American Federation of Labor's (AFL) Railway Employes' Department.

During World War I, Wharton served on the Committee on Labor of the Advisory Commission of the Council of National Defense. From 1918, he stepped back from his AFL post, while retaining the title. He instead served on the Railroad Administration Board of Railroad Wages and Working Conditions, and from 1920 instead on the Railroad Labor Board.

In 1922, Wharton officially left his AFL post, but he remained active in the Machinists, and in 1926 was elected as the union's president, serving until 1939. Under his leadership, the union's membership increased from 45,000 to 180,000. From 1928 to 1940, he was also a vice president of the AFL.

He died in Tucson, Arizona on December 21, 1944.

Trade union offices
Preceded by Henry B. Perham	President of the Railway Employes' Department; 1915–1922	Succeeded by Bert M. Jewell
Preceded by William Hugh Johnston	President of the International Association of Machinists; 1926–1939	Succeeded by Harvey W. Brown
Preceded by John Coefield	Sixth Vice-President of the American Federation of Labor; 1931–1934	Succeeded by Joseph N. Weber
Preceded by John Coefield	Fifth Vice-President of the American Federation of Labor; 1934–1940	Succeeded by Gustave M. Bugniazet
