= Lee W. Minton =

American labor union leader

Lee Webb Minton (November 17, 1911 – June 22, 1985) was an American labor union leader.

Born in Washington, Pennsylvania, Minton briefly attended a business college before becoming a glass blower. In 1934, he joined the Glass Bottle Blowers' Association of the United States and Canada (GBBA). He was elected to the union's executive board in 1938, and as treasurer of the union in 1944.

Early in 1946, Minton won election as vice-president of the GBBA, and later in the year, he became president. In 1951, he was the AFL-CIO's delegate to the convention of the Trades and Labor Congress of Canada, and in 1956, he was elected as a vice-president of the AFL-CIO. In 1966, he represented the federation to the International Confederation of Free Trade Unions.

Minton was a supporter of the Republican Party, chairing the National Labor for Rockefeller Committee in both 1964 and 1968. He served on the President's Task Force on Economic Growth for the 70s, and also on the board of directors of Care International. He retired from his union posts in 1971.

Trade union offices
Preceded by James Maloney	President of the Glass Bottle Blowers' Association; 1946–1971	Succeeded by Newton W. Black
Preceded by Joseph A. Beirne; William C. Doherty	AFL-CIO delegate to the Trades Union Congress; 1960; With: David J. McDonald	Succeeded by Karl Feller; George McGregor Harrison
