= William C. Doherty =

American union leader and diplomat

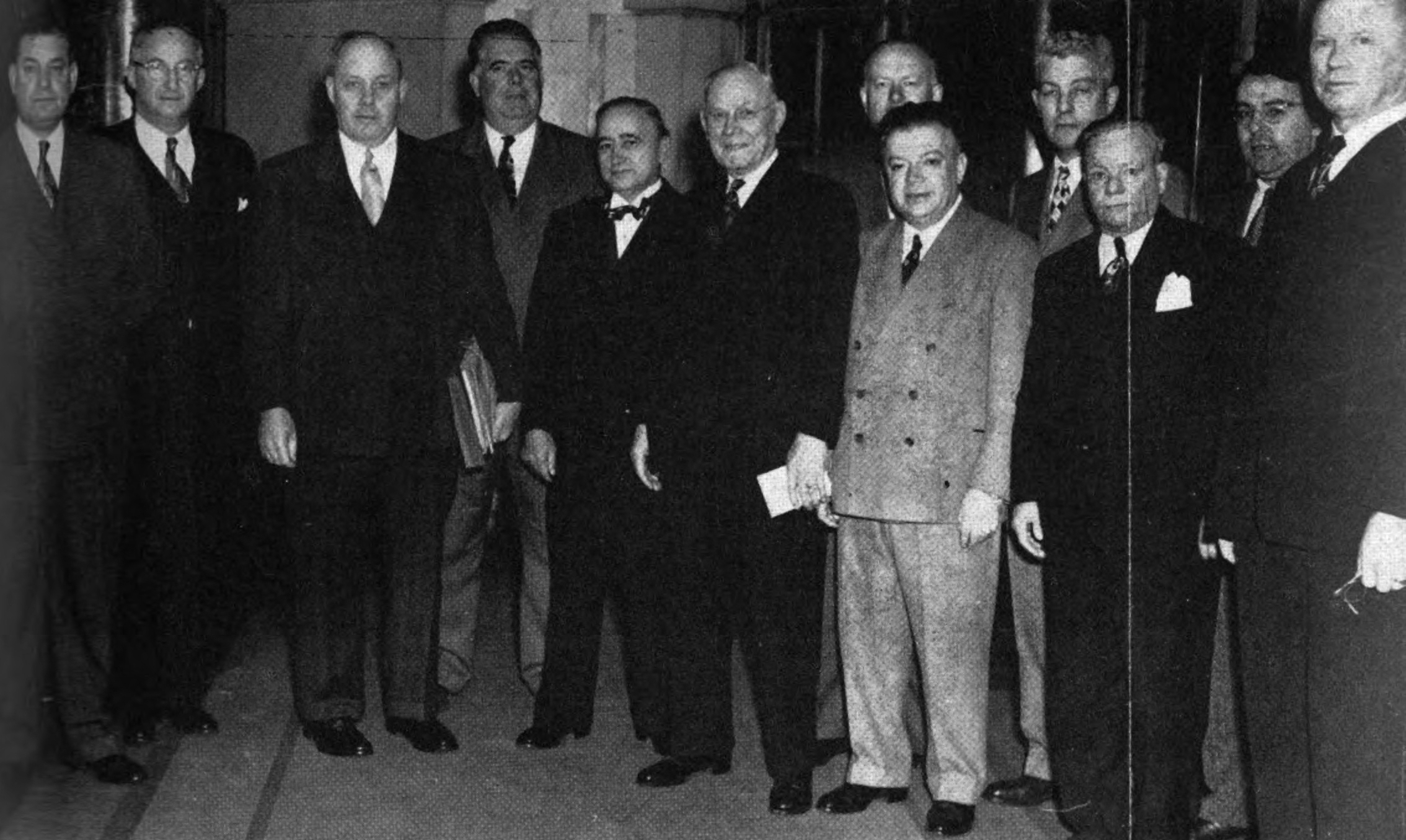
Doherty (fourth from left) with AFL delegates to the ICFTU conference in London, 1949

William Charles Doherty (February 23, 1902 – August 9, 1987) was an American labor union leader and ambassador.

Born in Glendale, Ohio, Doherty became a telegraph messenger in Cincinnati when he was 14. The year after, he was promoted to become a telegraph operator, and he joined the Commercial Telegraphers Union of America. In 1919, he falsified his age in order to join the U.S. Army, and he served in a secret operation in Siberia. He was promoted to become a sergeant, and in 1921, he was made chief radio operator on Corregidor, in the Philippines.

After leaving the army, Doherty became a letter carrier in Cincinnati. He joined the National Association of Letter Carriers, and in 1928, he was elected as president of his union branch. In 1932, he won election as president of the Ohio Letter Carriers' Association, and then in 1941, he became president of the national union.

Doherty was additionally elected as a vice-president of the American Federation of Labor (AFL), and as a delegate of the federation, he was one of the founders of the new International Confederation of Free Trade Unions. He also served as the AFL's representative to the British Trades Union Congress. In 1958, he achieved a pay increase for letter carriers by organizing rallies at Capitol Hill, and a day of prayer.

In 1962, John F. Kennedy appointed Doherty as United States ambassador to Jamaica. He retired in 1964.

Trade union offices
Preceded by Edward J. Gainor	President of the National Association of Letter Carriers; 1941–1962	Succeeded by Jerome J. Keating
Preceded by Hugo Ernst; Holt Ross	American Federation of Labor delegate to the Trades Union Congress; 1945; With: George Meany	Succeeded by Edward J. Brown; Thomas Kennedy
Preceded by William C. Birthright	Seventh Vice-President of the American Federation of Labor; 1951–1953	Succeeded by David Dubinsky
Preceded by William C. Birthright	Sixth Vice-President of the American Federation of Labor; 1953–1955	Succeeded by Federation merged
Preceded by George McGregor Harrison; Jacob Potofsky	AFL-CIO delegate to the Trades Union Congress; 1959; With: Joseph A. Beirne	Succeeded by David J. McDonald; Lee W. Minton
Diplomatic posts
Preceded by Irving G. Cheslaw	United States Ambassador to Jamaica; 1962–1964	Succeeded by Wilson T. M. Beale, Jr.
