= William C. Birthright =

American labor union leader

William Clark Birthright (May 27, 1887 – April 18, 1970) was an American labor union leader.

Born in Helena, Arkansas, Birthright moved with his family to Nashville at an early age, before becoming a barber. In 1907, he joined the Journeymen Barbers' International Union of America, and was almost immediately elected as vice-president of his local. From 1915 to 1924, he was secretary of the Nashville Trades and Labor Council.

In 1930, Birthright was elected as secretary-treasurer of the union, and in 1937, he also became its president. Under his leadership, the union changed its name to the "Journeymen Barbers, Hairdressers and Cosmetologists International Union of America", and its membership increased from 30,000 to over 70,000. In 1955, the New York Times described him as being the main spokesperson of the smaller labor unions.

Birthright served as an American Federation of Labor (AFL) delegate to the British Trades Union Congress in 1937, and from 1941, he was a vice-president of the American Federation of Labor (AFL). In 1951, he was nominated by the AFL to serve on the reconstituted Wage Stabilization Board, serving for two years.

By 1963, there was dissatisfaction in the union with the leadership of Birthright. He was convinced to stand town as president, but contested the election for the secretary-treasurer post, in which he was defeated by E. M. Sanders. In 1965, he was also persuaded to resign as a vice-president of what had become the AFL-CIO, as part of a clear-out of the older members of the federation's executive.

Trade union offices
Preceded by Herman C. Wenzel	Secretary-Treasurer of the Journeymen Barbers International Union; 1930–1963	Succeeded by E. M. Sanders
Preceded by James C. Shanessy	President of the Journeymen Barbers International Union; 1937–1963	Succeeded by Joseph N. De Paola
Preceded by Edward Canavan; William J. McSorley	American Federation of Labor delegate to the Trades Union Congress; 1937; With: John B. Haggerty	Succeeded by Paddy Morrin; Daniel J. Tobin
Preceded by William D. Mahon	Seventh Vice-President of the American Federation of Labor; 1949–1951	Succeeded by William C. Doherty
Preceded by Harry C. Bates	Sixth Vice-President of the American Federation of Labor; 1951–1953	Succeeded by William C. Doherty
Preceded by Harry C. Bates	Fifth Vice-President of the American Federation of Labor; 1953–1955	Succeeded by Federation merged
