= James Malone =

James or Jim Malone may refer to:

== Government ==
- James F. Malone (1904–1976), Allegheny County District Attorney in the 1950s for Pittsburgh
- James E. Malone Jr. (1957–2024), member of the Maryland House of Delegates
- James L. Malone (diplomat) (1931–1996), Asst. Secretary of State in the Reagan Administration
- James Malone (Australian politician) (1878–1952), New South Wales politician
- James Malone (American politician), member of the Pennsylvania Senate

== Sports ==
- James L. Malone (American football) (1908–1979), first head football coach for the University of Louisiana at Monroe Warhawks
- Jim Malone (footballer) (1925–2021), North Melbourne VFL footballer
- Jim Malone (ice hockey) (born 1962), retired Canadian ice hockey player

== Others ==
- James Malone (musician), member of the band Arsis
- James Joseph Malone (1883–?), Australian engineer
- James William Malone (1920–2000), Roman Catholic bishop of Youngstown
- Jim Malone, a character in the 1987 film The Untouchables, played by Sean Connery
