= Frank Farrington (unionist) =

American labor unionist (1873–1939)

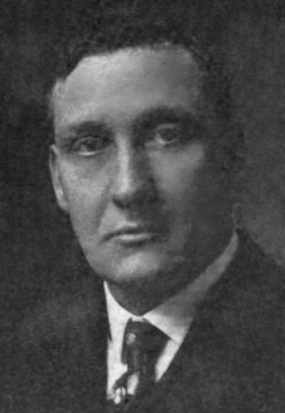
- In The Black Diamond, September 1919
- Born: September 19, 1873; Fairbury, Illinois, US
- Died: March 30, 1939 (aged 65); Streator, Illinois, US
- Occupation: Labor unionist

Frank Farrington (September 19, 1873 – March 30, 1939) was an American labor unionist.

== Biography ==
Born in Fairbury, Illinois on September 19, 1873, Farrington never attended school, and began working at a colliery in Streator, Illinois when he was nine years old. He joined the Knights of Labor in 1886, and later joined the United Mine Workers of America (UMWA). In 1914, he was elected as president of the union's District 12, covering Illinois.

Farrington was on the right wing of the union, but he was a fierce opponent of union leader John L. Lewis, and supported John H. Walker's activism in the Farmer-Labor Party. In 1919, he refused to hold a wage scale convention, against the wishes of many union members. In response, he disaffiliated 24 local unions, an action which was backed by Lewis. He did not support Alexander Howat, leader of the Kansas district, when he was imprisoned for breaking an anti-strike law. However, he did support Howat's 1924 attempt to implement rank-and-file election of union organizers, as he felt that this would weaken Lewis.

In 1926, Lewis divulged the information that Farrington had a contract with the Peabody Coal Company to serve as a consultant at a salary of $25,000 per year. Farrington was pressured into resigning, but he maintained his interest in the labor movement and went to the 1930 convention of the Reorganized United Mine Workers.

Farrington died at his home in Streator on March 30, 1939, and was buried at Riverview Cemetery.

Trade union offices
Preceded by John H. Walker	President of the United Mine Workers of America District No. 12; 1914–1926	Succeeded by Harry Fishwick
Preceded by Albert Adamski; Edward J. Evans	American Federation of Labor delegate to the Trades Union Congress; 1926; With: William Hutcheson	Succeeded by Michael Casey; John Coefield
