= James Maloney (unionist) =

James Maloney (September 11, 1870 – January 28, 1960) was an American labor union leader.

Born in Scranton, Pennsylvania, Maloney began working in a glass bottle factory at the age of eight. He later completed an apprenticeship as a glass bottle blower, and joined the Glass Bottle Blowers' Association (GBBA) in 1890. He held various posts in his local union, and then in 1909 was elected to the international union's executive board.

Maloney won election as a vice-president of the GBBA in 1917, and then in 1925 as president of the union. When he took over as leader of the union, it was struggling to continue after heavy job losses due to alcohol prohibition. He worked with leaders of the brewery and distillery unions to campaign for the repeal of prohibition, and once this took place, the GBBA's membership grew from 2,000 to 34,000.

Maloney served as the American Federation of Labor's delegate to the Trades and Labor Congress of Canada in 1935, and then to the British Trades Union Congress in 1939. He was also a founder of the Union Labor Life Insurance Company, and served for a time as its treasurer.

Maloney retired in 1946, returning to Scranton, where he died in 1960, at the age of 89.

Trade union offices
| Preceded by John A. Voll | President of the Glass Bottle Blowers' Association; 1925–1946 | Succeeded by Lee W. Minton |
| Preceded by Paddy Morrin; Daniel J. Tobin | American Federation of Labor delegate to the Trades Union Congress; 1939; With: Felix H. Knight | Succeeded by Daniel J. Tobin |
