= James P. Noonan =

James Patrick Noonan (December 15, 1871 – December 4, 1929) was an American labor union leader.

Born in St. Louis, Noonan left school when he was 14 to work in a mill. He served in the Spanish-American War, before becoming an electrician, and in 1900 joining the International Brotherhood of Electrical Workers. He became president of his local in 1904, and then vice-president of the international union in 1905. To take up this post, he moved to Springfield, Illinois.

In 1918, Noonan became acting president of the union, and was then elected in his own right the following year. He became a vice president of the Building Trades Department in 1922, and a vice-president of the American Federation of Labor in 1924. That year, he was also elected to the national committee of the Conference for Progressive Political Action, and on to both the National Public Safety Committee, and the United States Committee on Seasonal Employment in the Building Industry.

In 1929, Noonan fell asleep while smoking in his apartment. This caused a fire, in which he died.

Trade union offices
Preceded by Frank Joseph McNulty	President of the International Brotherhood of Electrical Workers; 1918–1929	Succeeded by Henry H. Broach
Preceded by James Wilson	Vice President of the American Federation of Labor; 1924–1929	Succeeded by John Coefield
