= International Union of United Brewery, Flour, Cereal, Soft Drink and Distillery Workers =

North American trade union

- Abbreviation: United Brewery Workers
- Successor: International Brotherhood of Teamsters (most US locals); Canadian Union of United Brewery, Flour, Cereal, Soft Drink and Distillery Workers; Various directly affiliated local unions of the AFL-CIO
- Formation: 1886
- Dissolved: 1973
- Type: Trade union
- Locations: Canada; United States
- President: Karl Feller
- Affiliations: AFL-CIO
- Formerly called: National Union of United Brewery Workmen (1886–1903); International Union of United Brewery Workmen of America (1903–1917); International Union of United Brewery and Soft Drink Workers of America (1917 – c. 1920); International Union of United Brewery, Flour, Cereal and Soft Drink Workers of America (c. 1920 – 1946)

The International Union of United Brewery, Flour, Cereal, Soft Drink and Distillery Workers was a labor union in Canada and the United States. The union merged with the Teamsters in 1973.

== Early history ==
The union was founded in 1886 as the National Union of United Brewery Workmen. The union's members were almost entirely Germans, and from 1886 to 1903 the union's convention and publications were in German.

The union affiliated with the American Federation of Labor (AFL) in 1887. The Brewery Workers were given a very wide jurisdictional charter by the AFL, making it one of the first industrial unions in the US.

In 1903, the union changed its name to the International Union of United Brewery Workmen of America. In 1917, the union changed its name to the International Union of United Brewery and Soft Drink Workers of America. Three years later it changed its name yet again, this time to the International Union of United Brewery, Flour, Cereal and Soft Drink Workers of America.

== Union jurisdiction ==
The Brewery Workers had a tumultuous relationship with the AFL. The union engaged in numerous jurisdictional disputes with unions representing firemen (boiler operators), teamsters and engineers from 1896 to 1907. In 1907, the AFL revoked the Brewery Workers' union charter. But a firestorm of protest from local unions around the country led the AFL to reinstate the charter in 1909, albeit with a number of limitations on the union's ability to organize workers outside of its newly narrowed jurisdiction.

Prohibition in the United States significantly weakened the union beginning in 1920.

The union recovered some after the repeal of Prohibition in 1933, but jurisdictional disputes with the Teamsters dramatically hindered new member organizing and drained the union's finances. In 1939, the Brewery Workers filed a charge with the AFL which alleged that the Teamsters were infringing on the use of the term "Brewery Workers." AFL president William Green sided with the Teamsters, however. In 1941, Green revoked the Brewery Workers' union charter again. The Brewery Workers and Teamsters continued to fight over potential members as well as raiding one another.

The Brewery Workers affiliated with the Congress of Industrial Organizations (CIO) in 1946. The same year, the union changed its name to the International Union of United Brewery, Flour, Cereal, Soft Drink, and Distillery Workers of America. The union fought a violent series of jurisdictional battles with the Teamsters in Pittsburgh, Pennsylvania, known as the "Pittsburgh beer war". The series of strikes, pickets, street battles and lawsuits ended on April 2, 1947, but was so violent and protracted that it led to a congressional investigation. Several years later, several locals were involved in the 1949 New York City brewery strike.

In 1953, Local 9 participated in the 1953 Milwaukee brewery strike, which involved over 7,000 workers at six breweries and lasted for 76 days.

The Brewery Workers joined the new AFL–CIO when the AFL and CIO merged in 1955.

The Brewery Workers continued to lose members in the 1950s and 1960s. Its battles with the Teamsters continued, costing it members and resources. But many local breweries also began closing, as large national brewers such as Anheuser-Busch expanded rapidly and either pushed them out of business or acquired them.

From 1977 to 1978, Brewery Workers Local 366 went on strike at the Coors Brewing Company's facilities in Golden, Colorado as part of the larger Coors strike and boycott. The strike ended in failure for the union, with the local being dissolved in the process.

== Teamster merger ==
In 1973, the Brewery Workers voted to merge with the Teamsters, and on October 19 were expelled from the AFL–CIO (to which the Teamsters did not at that time belong, having been expelled for corruption). Milwaukee's Local 9, the largest in the union, objected to the merger and voted 2,447 to 27 to leave the Brewery Workers and affiliate directly with the AFL-CIO, as did 26 other locals totaling about one-quarter of the union. The Milwaukee local eventually affiliated with the United Auto Workers.

The remainder of the union became the Brewery and Soft Drink Workers Conference of the Teamsters union.

The union's publication was Brewery Worker, and was published from 1886 to 1973.

The Brewery Workers union was one of the unions on the master list of Nixon's political opponents. Notable union members included Karl Feller.

== Leadership ==
=== Secretary-Treasurers ===
1886: Louis Herbrand
1888: Ludwig Arnheim (acting)
1888: Ernst Kurzenknabe
1892: Ernst Kurzenknabe and Charles F. Bechtold
1899: Charles F. Bechtold
1901: Julius Zorn
1904: Adam Hübner
1924: Joseph Obergfell
1941: Peter Bollenbacher
1941: William J. Kromelbein
1948: Joseph J. Hauser
1950: Thomas Rusch
1954: Arthur P. Gildea

=== Presidents ===
1949: Karl Feller
