= William D. Mahon =

William Daniel Mahon
- William D. Mahon from a set of playing cards published by the Amalgamated Meat Cutters and Butcher Workmen of North America
- Born: 1861; Athens, Ohio, United States
- Died: 1949 (aged 88)
- Occupation(s): Miner, streetcar driver, labor leader
- Known for: President of the Amalgamated Association of Street Railway Employees of America

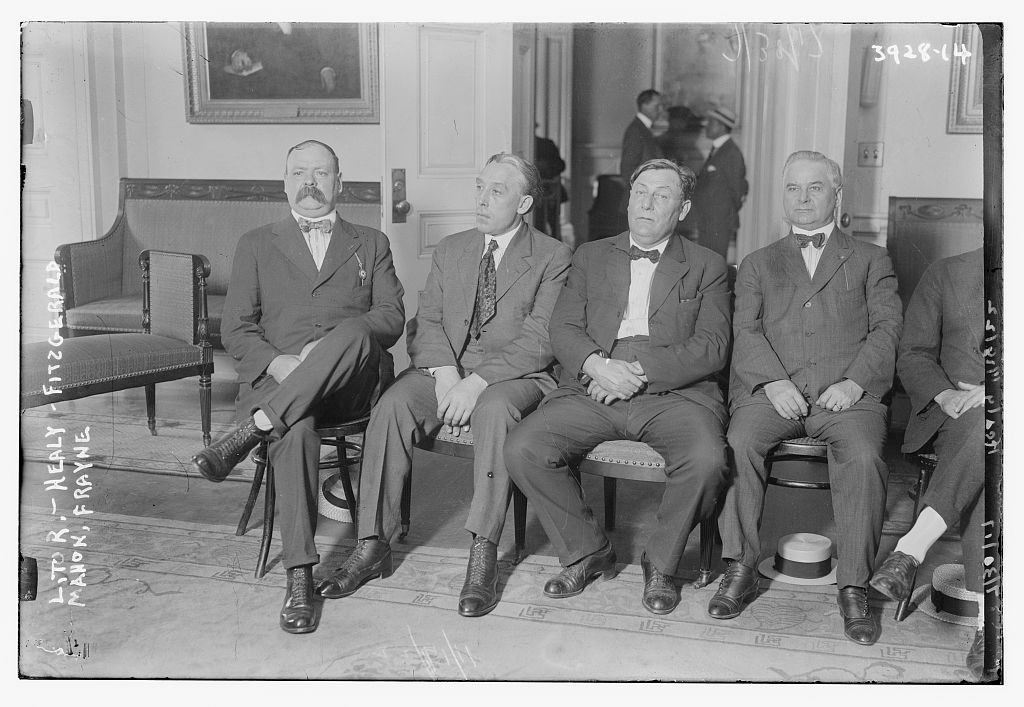
Timothy Healy (1863-1930), William B. Fitzgerald, William D. Mahon (1861-1949), and Hugh Frayne (1869-1934) in 1916.

William Daniel Mahon (1861–1949) was a former coal miner and streetcar driver who became president of the Amalgamated Association of Street Railway Employees of America, now the Amalgamated Transit Union.

== Early years ==
William D. Mahon was born in Athens, Ohio in 1861. He worked in the Hocking Valley coalfields of Ohio as a miner. In the late 1880s he moved to Columbus, Ohio and became a mule car driver. Mahon wrote of conditions in the days of horse-drawn trolleys, "It is a fact that in the early days the horse received much better treatment than the car man who drove him. Men could be easily replaced even at the miserable wages paid, but a horse cost money." In 1893 Mahon represented the Columbus local in asking the Ohio Legislature pass a law requiring streetcar companies to enclose their cars to protect the platform men. The request was successful despite strong opposition from the street railway owners, and the first vestibule law was passed that year.

The Amalgamated Association of Street Railway Employes (Note: The original name used the spelling "Employes", an accepted variant spelling of "Employees".) of America ("the Amalgamated") was founded at a meeting in Indianapolis, Indiana, in September 1892 called by Samuel Gompers of the American Federation of Labor. Mahon attended the meeting as representative of the Columbus local, but said little. William J. Law was elected president. The union struggled during its first year, and Law proved to be an ineffective leader. William D. Mahon was elected president at the 1893 convention.

== Labor leader ==
Unlike other AFL unions, the Amalgamated had an industrial charter, in theory covering all occupations in the transit industry. In practice, it mainly focused on motormen and conductors. Mahon was president of the Amalgamated from 1893 until he retired in 1946. From 1898 to 1900 he was also the presiding judge at the Michigan State Court of Arbitration. At the start of the 20th century the Amalgamated Association launched a militant organizing program. Although the union was always willing to arbitrate in disputes, there were many strikes against the streetcar companies. Often these turned violent. The public and small businesses sympathized with the strikers, and passengers and other unions often became involved in the street actions.

On 4 July 1897 the United Mine Workers called for a general strike for improved pay. Over 100,000 miners walked off the job in the first four days. The AFL saw the importance to the overall labor movement of the strike succeeding, and on 9 July 1897 placed Mahon in charge of coordinating a plan to help the West Virginia miners. Union organizers spoke in mining towns throughout the coalfields, and the orderly behavior of the miners even when provoked drew public support. The strike was successful, and was a great victory for the labor movement.

Mahon became a member of the executive committee of the National Civic Federation (NCF), an organization in which labor leaders and business executives discussed cooperation. Towards the end of 1904 August Belmont, president of the NCF and head of the Interborough Rapid Transit Company (IRT) of New York, began working towards removing the unions from the IRT. Belmont brought in strikebreakers and failed to comply with existing contracts with the unions. This was not appropriate behavior for the NCF president. The New York conciliation committee of the NCF approached Mahon and Warren Stanford Stone of the Brotherhood of Locomotive Engineers, "trying to impress the labor end of the dispute with the importance of being fair and decent." Mahon and Stone agreed not to support a strike, but the locals walked out anyway, although the strike did not last long.

As of October 1907 the NCF had three categories of executive committee member. "On the Part of the Public" included people such as former President Grover Cleveland, the industrialist and philanthropist Andrew Carnegie and Episcopal Bishop Henry C. Potter of New York City. "On the Part of Employers" included the heads of major companies in industry, transport, finance and publishing. "On the Part of Wage Earners" included Samuel Gompers, president of the American Federation of Labor and the heads of major unions including Mahon.

In May 1913 Mahon was appointed to a three-man Detroit Street Railway Commission by Mayor Oscar Marx to study the possibility of municipal ownership of the streetcar lines. The Detroit United Railway had a monopoly of streetcar service in the city. The Street Railway Commission made an offer to purchase the DUR in late summer of 1913, which was rejected. However, they agreed that the question of municipal ownership would be submitted to the voters, and if they approved the Wayne County Circuit Court would set the price. In April 1914 Mahon quit the commission claiming that Mayor Marx was trying to subvert the municipal takeover. In May 1915 the Detroit street railway workers went on strike for a day.

During World War I (1914-1918) Mahon made much of the contribution of streetcar workers to the war effort. Although employees complained that the streetcar operators were not raising wages to compensate for inflation, he said, "But no matter how justifiable this unrest may be, it must not influence us to acts that will compromise our integrity as an organization of workers that stands by its agreements and holds its obligations sacred." He generally managed to prevent strikes during the war. After the war ended, however, Mahon was unable to prevent a wave of strikes. In 1919-1920 he served as a member of the Federal Electric Railways Commission.

Mahon was twice a member of the executive council of the American Federation of Labor, from 1917–23 and 1935-46. After the 1932 Presidential election, the AFL wanted one of their members to be chosen Secretary of Labor, as had generally been done in the past. Mahon supported Daniel J. Tobin, president of the Teamsters, who won the backing of the AFL Executive Council. In the end President Franklin D. Roosevelt selected Frances Perkins, who took office on 5 March 1933.

In 1936 Mahon was on the AFL Executive Council during a crisis in the relationship with the recently formed CIO (Committee for Industrial Organization), the precursor of the Congress of Industrial Organizations. The CIO advocated industrial unionism, with one union representing all workers in a given plant, while the AFL was dominated by supporters of craft unionism, with different unions for each skilled occupation. The council voted 13-1 to give ten unions a deadline for breaking with the CIO or else being suspended from the AFL. Mahon was not entirely comfortable with the decision, but voted with the majority. Only David Dubinsky of the International Ladies' Garment Workers' Union voted against.

William D. Mahon retired in 1946 and died three years later at the age of 88. He was said to have been the longest-serving leader of a union in the history of the United States.

== Beliefs ==
Mahon had strong religious beliefs. In an 1899 speech he called for the church to play a greater role in supporting organized labor, saying its "true mission" was to "establish the brotherhood of man."

The report of the union's 1899 convention says the "question of drawing the color line in Ritual and Constitution was discussed at some length, and it was stated by delegates from the South that they had never seen a colored man on a streetcar." Despite this, when Mahon visited the south he spoke to groups of black union members. In 1937 Alexander F. Whitney informed mayor Fiorello La Guardia of New York City that the Brotherhood of Railroad Trainmen planned to start organizing Independent Subway System (ISS) motormen and conductors. At first, LaGuardia said he had no objection. Later he noted that the non-segregated Amalgamated Association might be more appropriate given the number of black ISS conductors.

Mahon saw arbitration as the best way to solve disputes, and would not authorize strikes unless the employer rejected this approach. (Note: Mahon did not invariably insist on arbitration. During World War I he sanctioned strikes against employment of women as conductors, presumably because the matter was so serious.) In 1918 a strike by laundry workers in Kansas City escalated into a general strike involving streetcar workers. Mahon met the local union leaders and voiced his strong disapproval, saying they had violated their contracts and damaged the possibility of good relations with their employers. He and other union chiefs would order the strikers back to work if the local leaders refused to do so. In September 1920 Brooklyn Rapid Transit workers went on strike. Mahon addressed a meeting of the strikers. He said, "I regret you were not more prudent and careful in going out on strike. You can get into strikes easily and I regret your impatience. The thing, however, has been done..." He then called for New York Mayor John Francis Hylan to be appointed the sole arbiter of the strike.

William D. Mahon was quoted as saying "I would sooner face the world with an organization of ten thousand men with $1 million in their treasury than I would with an organization of ten million men with ten thousand in their treasury."

Trade union offices
Preceded by Union founded	President of the Amalgamated Association of Street Railway Employees of America; 1893–1946	Succeeded by A. L. Spradling
Preceded by Charles L. Baine; Louis Kemper	American Federation of Labor delegate to the Trades Union Congress; 1916; With: Matthew Woll	Succeeded by James Lord; John Golden
Preceded by Frank Duffy	Sixth Vice-President of the American Federation of Labor; 1918–1919	Succeeded by Thomas A. Rickert
Preceded by William Green	Fifth Vice-President of the American Federation of Labor; 1919–1923	Succeeded by Thomas A. Rickert
Preceded by Harry C. Bates	Seventh Vice-President of the American Federation of Labor; 1947–1949	Succeeded by William C. Birthright
