= Daniel J. Tobin =

American labor leader (1875–1955)

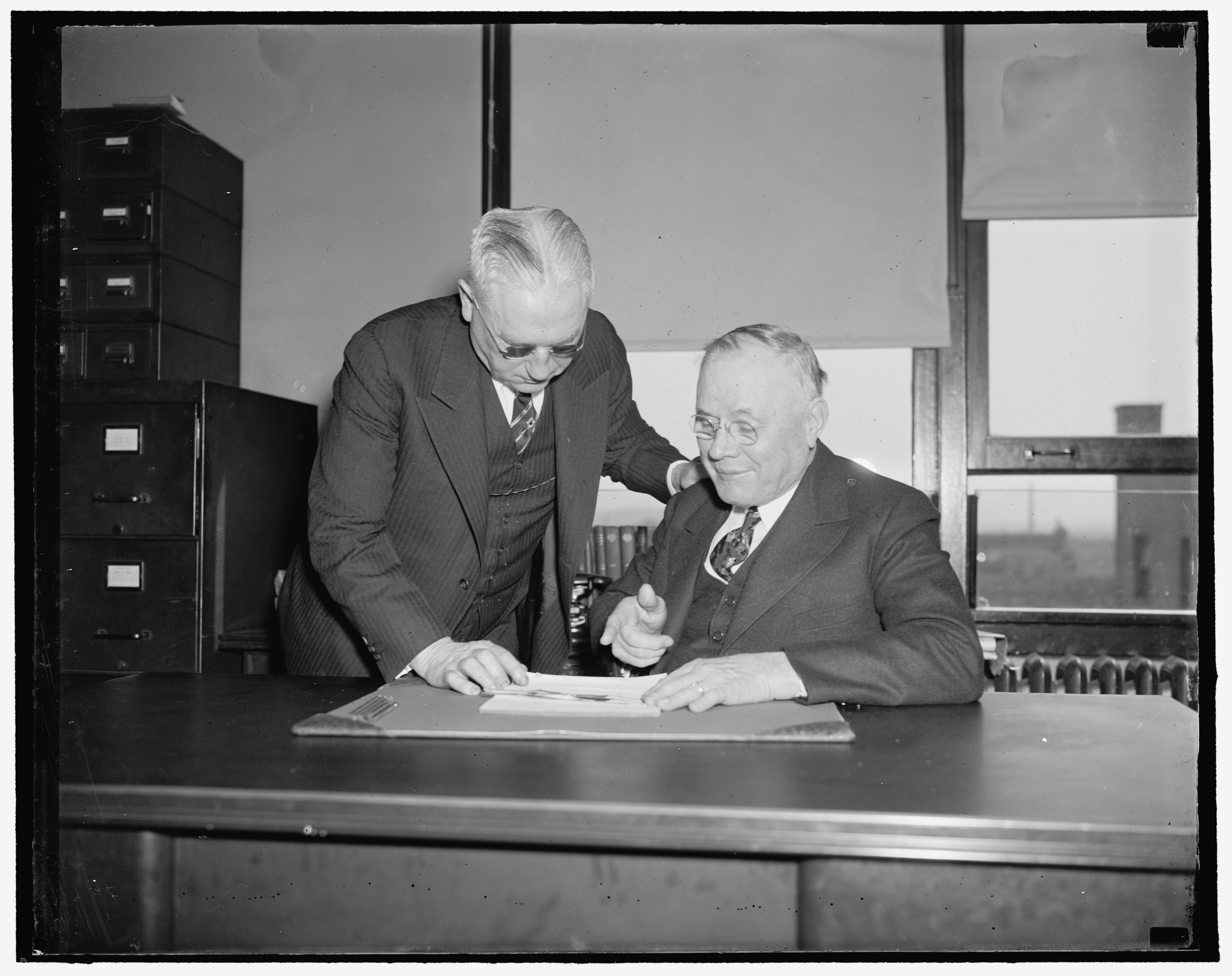
- Tobin (standing)
- Born: April 1875; Miltown Malbay, County Clare, Ireland
- Died: November 14, 1955 (aged 80); Indianapolis, Indiana, U.S.
- Occupation: Union leader
- Spouse(s): Annie (Reagan) Tobin (d. 1920); Irene (Halloran) Tobin
- Children: Frank, Frederick, Joseph, John, Edmund, Katherine
- Parent(s): John and Bridget (Kennelly) Tobin

Daniel Joseph Tobin (April 1875 – November 14, 1955) was an American labor leader and president of the International Brotherhood of Teamsters (IBT, or "the Teamsters") from 1907 to 1952. From 1917 to 1928, he was treasurer of the American Federation of Labor. He served on the federation's Executive Council beginning in 1934, and served until his resignation in 1952.

== Early life ==
Tobin was born in Miltown Malbay, County Clare, Ireland, on April 2, 1875, and baptized on April 3, 1875, at St. Joseph's Roman Catholic Church in Miltown Malbay to John and Bridget (Kennelly) Tobin. His father was a shopkeeper, and the family Roman Catholic. He attended public school in Ireland, but did not graduate. In August 1898, he married Annie Reagan. The couple had five sons and one daughter.

Tobin immigrated to Boston, Massachusetts, in 1890. He found employment as a sheet metal worker, and attended high school in Cambridge, Massachusetts at night. In 1894, he became a motorman and driver for a local street car company. He found work as a truck driver for a local meatpacking firm (earning $11 a week), and joined Local 25 of the Teamsters at its founding. He was elected the union's business representative in 1904. On January 1, 1907, he was elected president of the Teamsters' Joint District Council covering the Boston area.

== Election as Teamster president ==
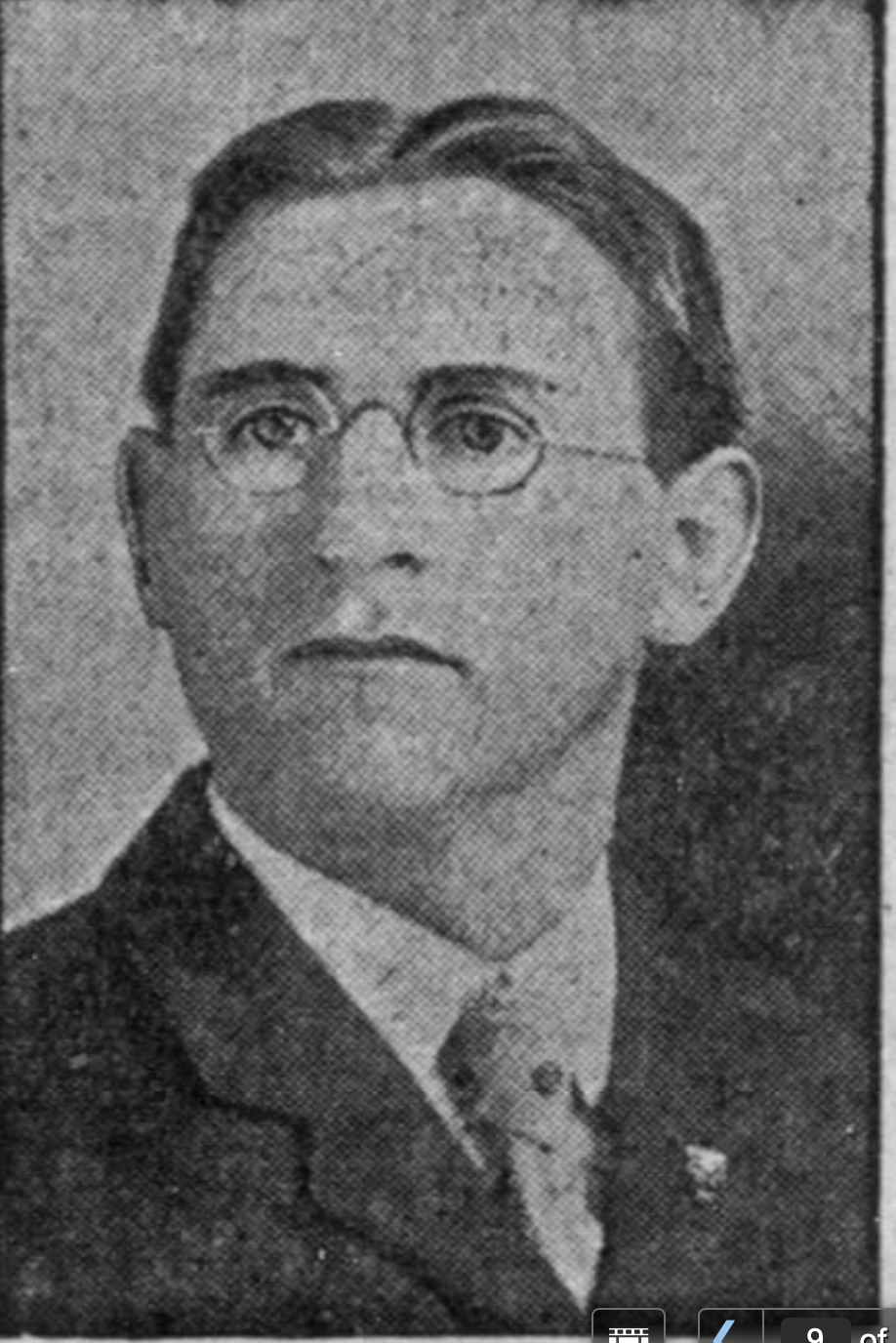
Tobin c. 1910

The American Federation of Labor (AFL) had begun organizing local unions of teamsters soon after its founding in 1886. These local unions were directly affiliated with the AFL rather than a national union of their own. In November 1898, the AFL called a convention to establish a national union for teamsters—the Team Drivers' International Union. George Innis was elected the union's first president. In 1902, another new national union of teamsters formed in Chicago, Illinois, the Team Driver's National Union. In 1903, the AFL brokered a merger agreement between the two unions, which created the International Brotherhood of Teamsters. Cornelius Shea was elected the union's first president, but the union remained divided between its two primary predecessor groups.

In 1905, Shea led the Teamsters in a walkout aimed at the Montgomery Ward department store in Chicago. The strike, which was unsuccessful, was a violent, long and bitter one. Toward the end of the strike, Shea and several other Teamster leaders were indicted on charges of extortion. Angry at the strike's failure, Shea's apparent guilt in the extortion plot, and Shea's failure to unite the union's two warring factions, union members ousted Shea in August 1907 and elected Tobin in his place by a vote of 104 to 94

Tobin took control as president of the international union on August 10, 1907, and moved to Indianapolis, Indiana, (where the IBT's headquarters were then located). Although he faced opposition in his re-election races in 1908, 1909 and 1910, he never faced opposition again until his retirement in 1952.

== Teamster presidency, 1907-1931 ==
Tobin faced a crisis early in his presidency. In mid-1907, a group of dissident teamsters, the United Teamsters of America, had formed as a dual union and was seeking to organize members. Tobin pleaded for Samuel Gompers, president of the AFL, to intervene and bring about unity. Although Gompers worked hard at healing the rift, he was unsuccessful. When unity proved unworkable, Gompers denounced the United Teamsters as a dual union, declared their organizing practices deceptive, used the power of the AFL to promote the Teamsters as the only "legitimate" union for drivers, and ordered all local and regional AFL bodies to refuse to affiliate or cooperate with the United Teamsters. The tactics worked, and the United Teamsters soon faded away.

Much of Tobin's presidency was consumed by a long-running and sometimes physically violent jurisdictional battle with the National Union of United Brewery Workmen. The Teamsters had challenged the Brewery Workmen's right to organize beer wagon drivers in 1903 and 1905. At Tobin's insistence, in 1907 the AFL revoked the Brewery Workers' charter, but a firestorm of protest from local unions around the country led the AFL to reinstate the charter in 1909. In 1933, the AFL Executive Council agreed to strip the brewery workers' union, now known as the United Brewery Workers, of the beer drivers. The United Brewery Workers filed suit in federal court in 1936 seeking to bar their suspension and the transfer of workers to the Teamsters. As the case worked its way to the Supreme Court of the United States the AFL attempted to mediate the dispute to no avail. The Supreme Court found in the AFL's favor, and the United Brewery Workers were suspended from the AFL.

Tobin led the Teamsters in a series of raids against the United Brewery Workers for the next several years. Both unions also fought over the same workers in numerous organizing campaigns. The United Brewery Workers affiliated with the CIO in July 1946 to try to marshal enough resources to stop the raids. A major dispute broke out in September 1946 in Pittsburgh, Pennsylvania. Both unions engaged in jurisdictional strikes against one another. Beatings, riots and bombings occurred in Pittsburgh, Philadelphia, New Jersey and Ohio. Fears grew that the labor war would spread across the country. An NLRB election held in 1949 was won by the United Brewery Workers and defused the tense situation, but raiding continued for the next 20 years.

The Teamsters also engaged in fierce jurisdictional disputes with the Gasoline State Operators' National Council (an AFL federal union of gas station attendants), the International Longshore and Warehouse Union, the Retail Clerks International Union, and the Brotherhood of Railway Clerks.

The Teamsters began to expand dramatically and mature organizationally under Tobin. When he was elected president, power in the union was held by big-city locals—which handled all research, contract negotiations, legal services, communication and strike activity. Tobin pushed for the development of "joint councils" to which all local unions were forced to affiliate. Varying in geographical and industrial jurisdiction, the joint councils became important incubators for up-and-coming leadership and negotiating master agreements which covered all employers in a given industry. As collective bargaining became the norm throughout the Teamsters, Tobin actively discouraged strikes in order to bring discipline to the union and encourage employers to sign contracts. Tobin also founded and edited (for a time) the union magazine, the International Teamster.

Initially, Tobin remained outside the AFL's decision-making hierarchy. But his policy stands reflected his support for Gompers. In 1913, when the Western Federation of Miners (WFM) was locked in a bitter strike in Michigan, Tobin supported Gompers' refusal to establish a national strike fund to aid the WFM—or any other union, for that matter.

In 1915, the Catholic Archbishop of Trois-Rivières, Quebec, François-Xavier Cloutier, denounced secular labor unions. Archbishop Cloutier urged Catholics to abandon secular trade unions and join Catholic workers' unions. By 1919, anecdotal reports indicated that the number of Canadian Catholic workers leaving unions affiliated with the AFL had grown significantly, and Gompers feared a backlash by Protestant union members. In 1921, Gompers appointed Tobin, along with Matthew Woll and Frank Duffy, to a committee to investigate the problem. Their report indicated that the number of disaffiliating members was low; the problem was limited to the cities of Montreal, Sherbrooke and Quebec City; and that the only union significantly affected was the Carpenters. Tobin and the others issued a report documenting the inferior contracts of the Catholic workers' unions, and the issue was laid to rest.

In late 1916, Samuel Gompers began pushing for the AFL to take a strongly supportive stance on President Woodrow Wilson's pro-war policies vis-a-vis Germany. Tobin and eight other international union leaders met on May 27, 1915, to oppose American war preparations. Unwilling to actually oppose war, the group asked Gompers to form a committee to enunciate labor's stand on the European conflict. When war came, Gompers wholeheartedly supported it. On March 11, 1917, the AFL Executive Council met and (reportedly) unanimously endorsed American entry in the war. Tobin quickly exposed this as a lie. In an article in the International Teamster, he wrote that the vote had been up-or-down, with no possibility of amendment. He also reported that he himself had abstained from voting, which made the vote only technically unanimous. After the United States entered World War I, Tobin initially refused to acceded to Gompers' request for a ban on strikes.

In 1917, Tobin defeated John B. Lennon in the race for treasurer of the AFL. Although membership in the AFL had risen to 2.371 million in 1917 from 2.072 million the year before, socialists and others in the federation felt that Lennon had not been sufficiently aggressive. Tobin, however, was forced to defend his previous actions, denounce pacifism, and declare his full support for the war effort. AFL president Samuel Gompers and Tobin quickly became close friends and supporters of one another. Tobin quickly became one of the inner circle of AFL vice presidents (which included Matthew Woll, John P. Frey and William Hutcheson). During the presidency of William Green, Tobin and the others largely controlled the AFL.

Tobin served as one of the AFL's delegates to the President's Industrial Commission in 1919.

That same year, Gompers chose Tobin as the AFL's second delegate to the founding convention of the International Federation of Trade Unions (IFTU). Tobin would serve as an AFL delegate to the IFTU until the AFL withdrew from that body in 1945. In 1918 and 1920, he served as an AFL delegate to the Pan-American Labor Conference.

In 1920, Annie Tobin died. In October 1922, Tobin married the former Irene Halloran. The couple had one daughter.

In September 1921, Tobin attempted to resign as treasurer of the AFL in a dispute with Gompers over the AFL's support for unemployment insurance. Gompers opposed the legislation, fearing worker dependence on government handouts and that government rather than unions would be seen as more important to workers. Tobin strongly supported the initiative, however. Gompers, however, realized he was in the minority on the AFL Executive Council and relented. Gompers refused to accept Tobin's resignation, and Tobin continued as treasurer.

In 1921, Tobin helped defeat an amendment offered by African American union members which would have forced all members of the AFL to remove the word "white" from their constitutions and to admit all workers regardless of race, creed or nationality. Although three resolutions were offered, only one made it to the convention floor. When black delegates attempted to bypass the Committee on Organization (which had jurisdiction over the resolutions) and introduce the amendments on the floor of the 1921 AFL convention, Tobin supported Gompers in declaring the amendment out of order because it violated the AFL's explicit policy of noninterference in its members' affairs.

Tobin tried and failed to get the AFL to endorse Robert M. La Follette for President in 1924. When Tobin attempted to obtain AFL endorsement of the candidacy of Democrat Alfred E. Smith in the 1928 presidential election, AFL President William Green forced a resolution through the AFL Executive Council which reaffirmed the federation's nonpartisan policy. Tobin resigned as treasurer of the AFL in anger. Although Green and others feared the Teamsters might withdraw from the federation, Tobin assured the Executive Council he had no intention of doing so.

He became increasingly involved in Democratic politics, and chaired the Labor Bureau of the Democratic National Committee in 1932, 1936, 1940, and 1944. His re-appointment in 1936 by DNC chair James A. Farley deeply upset the leadership of the Congress of Industrial Organizations (CIO), who felt Tobin an uninspired campaigner and strategist. In response, the CIO formed Labor's Non-Partisan League to fully and completely mobilize labor support for Roosevelt. But despite the division in the American labor movement, by 1944 Tobin was working closely with the CIO PAC.

== Teamster presidency, 1931-1952 ==
When Franklin D. Roosevelt was elected president in 1932, William Green and other AFL officials attempted to have Tobin appointed Secretary of Labor. Tobin was an ardent New Dealer. Roosevelt appeared to express an interest in Tobin, but told close associates he was also considering John P. Frey and Edward McGrady. Roosevelt eventually chose Frances Perkins, angering Green.

Tobin proved to be an adept organizer. Teamster membership stood at just 82,000 in 1932. Tobin took advantage of the wave of pro-union sentiment engendered by the passage of the National Industrial Recovery Act, and by 1935 union membership had risen nearly 65 percent to 135,000. By 1941, Tobin had a dues-paying membership of 530,000—making the Teamsters the fastest-growing labor union in the United States.

Under Tobin, the Teamsters first developed the "conference" system. The regional conference was first adopted by Dave Beck, president of the Seattle Joint Council, as a means of counteracting the conservative leadership of Joint Councils in San Francisco. In 1937, Beck persuaded Tobin that the Western Conference of Teamsters was no threat to the power and authority of the international union. Soon, conferences had sprung up across the U.S., providing stability, organizing strength and leadership to the international union.

But under Tobin, corruption became much more widespread in the Teamsters. By 1941, the union was considered the most corrupt in the United States, and the most abusive towards its own members. Tobin vigorously defended the union against such accusations, but also instituted many constitutional and organizational changes and practices which made it easier for union officials to engage in criminal offenses.

He was elected a vice president of the AFL in 1934, after the council expanded to 18. He was appointed chair of the Committee on Laws, which oversaw constitutional amendments to the AFL constitution. As chair of the committee, Tobin blocked proposals by John L. Lewis in 1935 to weaken craft unionism and permit industrial unionism.

Tobin was a very strong anti-communist and anti-fascist. He argued that holding radical ideas was not enough to warrant expulsion of a union from the AFL, but supporting the Communist Party was. His anti-fascist views were given less prominence in his actions. However, he was highly critical of Father Charles Coughlin. When President Green sent an observer to a meeting of Coughlin's National Union for Social Justice, Tobin excoriated Green for doing so (and for not consulting the Executive Council first).

Tobin's anti-communism led him to attempt to dismantle Local 574, which had led the successful Minneapolis Teamsters Strike of 1934. The local (led by Carl Skoglund, Farrell Dobbs and the Dunne Brothers) was avowedly Trotskyist, but had successfully led the union through the general strike. Alarmed at the local leadership's political views, Tobin revoked Local 574's charter and set up a competing local (Local 500). But after Local 574 secured a jurisdictional agreement in early 1935 from the Minneapolis Central Labor Union, it undertook a wildly successful organizing campaign and thrived. The AFL and the Minnesota Federation of Labor were alarmed at the growth of the Trotskyist-led union, and demanded action. In October 1935, the Teamsters international union passed a resolution denying membership to communists. Tobin also agreed to let an AFL organizer attempt to raid Local 574. The AFL and Local 574 engaged in mutual acts of violence. But when it became clear that Local 574 could not be raided and that the CIO might offer membership to the renegade local, Tobin convinced Local 574 leader Victor Dunne to merge with Local 500. A year later, the newly formed Local 544 had organized 250,000 truckers in the Midwest and formed the Central Conference of Teamsters. But after several of Local 544's leaders left the organization, Tobin trusted the local in 1941 and ejected the remaining Trotskyist leadership. When the CIO offered the ousted leaders a role in the newly formed United Construction Workers Organizing Committee, Tobin used his influence with the federal government to secure a federal indictment of sedition under the Smith Act. Several of the men were convicted (although most were acquitted or had charges dropped), and the local broken.

Tobin was a lukewarm supporter of the National Labor Relations Act (NLRA). He did not oppose its passage, but expressed deep concern that the Act did not expressly protect craft unionism and allow the creation of craft-based bargaining units. Tobin convinced the AFL to seek introduction of an amendment permitting bargaining units along craft lines. But although Senator Robert F. Wagner agreed to submit the amendment, he failed to do so. After the quick growth of the CIO under the NLRB, Tobin became disenchanted and suggested that the NLRA be repealed and the NLRB disbanded. In time, Tobin came to strongly support the Act.

Although Tobin supported the principle of craft unionism, he was tolerant of unions which advocated industrial unionism under certain limitations. In many ways, the Teamsters were already an industrial union, with wide diversity in membership, and Tobin advocated a moderate line toward industrial unionism in part to defend his own union. When the AFL Executive Council proposed in July 1935 suspending the unions which had formed the Committee for Industrial Organization, Tobin argued that the Executive Council lacked the authority to do so. But once the Executive Council's decision was made, Tobin enforced it and ordered Teamster local unions to cut off relations with CIO unions.

Tobin remained eager to heal the breach between AFL and CIO, however. Tobin had a strong relationship with John L. Lewis, and the AFL relied on this relationship in peace talks. Tobin was a member of the AFL committee, involved in merger talks in 1936, 1937, and 1939 and helped negotiate the 1942 agreement, which established a joint AFL-CIO jurisdictional disputes committee. In a front-page article which appeared in The New York Times on January 19, 1942, Lewis claimed that he and Tobin had agreed to merge the AFL and CIO on the condition that William Green retire, George Meany become president, and Philip Murray accept demotion to secretary-treasurer. He played an active role in the 1943 negotiations to get United Mine Workers of America (UMWA) back into AFL, and served on the Committee of Ten, which negotiated the merger of the AFL and CIO in 1955. Tobin had long opposed UMWA reaffiliation except on the terms dictated by the 1935 AFL Executive Council's trial of the CIO unions. But the growing influence of the CIO in government councils and in the eyes of the media mitigated Tobin's arguments and led the Executive Council to readmit the union in 1946.

In June 1940, President Roosevelt appointed Tobin to be the official White House liaison to organized labor. But Tobin resigned on August 26, 1940. He accepted re-appointment as chair of the Labor Division of the Democratic National Committee as worries about Roosevelt's ability to win a third term mounted.

On September 23, 1944, Roosevelt gave his famous "Fala speech" while campaigning in the 1944 presidential election. Because of Roosevelt's strong relationship with Tobin, the President delivered his speech before the Teamster convention.

The first real challenge to Tobin's leadership of the Teamsters also came in 1940. The Teamsters paid Tobin a salary of $30,000 that year, when the large union had only 450,000 members. But despite the financial encomium, dissident members of the union accused him of being a dictator over the union's affairs. Tobin angrily denied the charges. Over the next year, however, Tobin cracked down on dissidents and trusteed several large locals led by his political opponents.

During World War II, Tobin strongly supported the labor movement's no-strike pledge. In early 1942, President Roosevelt asked the AFL and CIO to appoint members to a "Labor War Board" (also known as the "Labor Victory Board") to advise him on how labor could contribute to the war effort. Tobin and the other labor leaders agreed to cease raiding one another and to not strike for the duration of the national emergency. Nevertheless, Tobin sanctioned strikes involving Midwestern truckers in August 1942, Southern truckers in October 1943, and brewery workers and milk delivery drivers in January 1945. But he also demanded that other unions punish wildcat strikers, asked the public to punish those unions which went on strike, and ordered his own members to cross picket lines unless specifically told not to by the international union.

In 1942, President Roosevelt again asked Tobin to join the White House staff. This time, he appointed Tobin as a special representative to the United Kingdom and charged him with investigating the state of the labor movement there. After a month abroad, Tobin reported that although Great Britain suffered from a number of strikes, the labor unions were not communist-dominated nor unpatriotic and that the large number of strikes was justified.

He was considered three times for Secretary of Labor, and twice refused the post—in 1943 and 1947.

Tobin did not, however, permit the Teamsters to participate in the great post-war wave of labor strikes. In the two years following the cessation of hostilities, the Teamsters only struck three times: One unit of 10,000 truckers in New Jersey struck for two weeks. Workers at UPS struck nationwide for three weeks before Tobin ordered an end to the strike. And workers at Railway Express Agency struck for almost a month before Tobin ordered workers back to work.

Tobin strongly opposed the Taft-Hartley Act and repeatedly called for its repeal. Nonetheless, he was one of the first labor leaders to sign the non-communist affidavit required by the law.

In 1948, Tobin became disenchanted with the Democratic Party and President Harry S. Truman. For the first time since 1928, he refused to be a delegate to the Democratic National Convention, and refused to speak at the convention when invited to do so. In the 1948 presidential election, he refused to endorse Truman, refused to put the resources of the national Teamsters union behind Truman's re-election, and told local unions to vote their conscience.

== Retirement and death ==
Tobin ruled the Teamsters in a relatively autocratic fashion for much of his tenure as president. Although challenged by the rank-and-file in 1940, no serious contender for the presidency emerged until nearly a decade later.

The first sign that Tobin had a challenger within the Teamsters came in 1947. Dave Beck had risen steadily in the Teamsters hierarchy in the Pacific Northwest, becoming president of the Western Conference of Teamsters in 1937 and an international vice-president in 1940. As Beck's influence rose, Tobin attempted to check his growing power but failed. After Beck's election as vice-president, he began to challenge Tobin for control of the union. In 1947, Beck marshaled his forces and defeated a proposed dues increase to fund new organizing. In 1942, he began a six-year campaign to seize control of the International Teamster newsmagazine. He ousted its editor and won the executive board's approval to install his own man in the job in 1948. In 1946, Beck successfully campaigned to amend the union's constitution to create the post of executive vice-president. He subsequently won the 1947 election to fill the position.

In 1948, Beck essentially supplanted Tobin as the real power in the Teamsters union. On April 22, 1948, the Machinists (which was not a member of the AFL) struck Boeing in Seattle, Washington. On May 28, Beck announced that Teamsters would seek to organize the workers at Boeing, and formed Aeronautical Workers and Warehousemen Helpers Union Local 451 to raid the Machinists. Beck and Boeing officials made a secret agreement in which Boeing would hire members of Local 451—essentially hiring Teamsters as scabs and strikebreakers. After as many as a third of the Machinists had joined the Teamsters, the Machinists agreed to return to work without a contract. Beck's actions were nearly universally condemned by members of the AFL Executive Council. The AFL Executive Council met in August 1948 to take action against Beck. The day before the meeting, Tobin privately told associates that he would repudiate Beck. But at a secret meeting that afternoon, Beck and his followers on the West Coast confronted Tobin with a fait accompli: Beck had allied with his long-time enemy Jimmy Hoffa. He now had more than enough votes on the Teamsters executive board to overrule Tobin if he tried to fire Beck. At the AFL meeting the next day, Tobin was forced to defend Beck's actions. Unwilling to embarrass an AFL vice president and create a confrontation with the Teamsters, the AFL Executive Council condoned the Teamster raid on the Machinists.

Five months later, Beck won approval of a significant reform of the union's internal structure. Instead of the four divisions which existed under Tobin, Beck proposed 16 divisions organized around each of the major job categories in the union's membership. Although nearly 1,000 Teamster leaders attended the conference in which the restructuring was debated and approved, Tobin did not.

In 1951, Tobin's tenuous hold on the Teamsters was further exposed when Tom Hickey, reformist leader of the Teamsters in New York City, won election to the executive board. Tobin had needed Beck's support to prevent Hickey's election, and Beck refused to give it.

On September 4, 1952, Tobin announced he would step down as president of the Teamsters at the end of his term. But as the mid-October Teamster convention neared, Tobin and his supporters formed a draft movement designed to subvert Beck's control of the delegates. Beck retaliated by publicly supporting the draft movement, but privately threatening to strip Tobin of his pension and benefits should he lose an election.

At the convention which opened on October 14, the 77-year-old Tobin was paid well to vacate the presidency. His pay was increased to $50,000 (about $393,000 in 2007 dollars) from $30,000, and the executive board was authorized to pay him this salary for life. Beck submitted a resolution asking Tobin to stay on as president, but forced Tobin to refuse. As further humiliation, Tobin nominated Beck for president. He was elected by acclamation. Beck pushed through a number of changes intended to make it harder for a challenger to build the necessary majority to unseat a president or reject his policies.

After William Green died on November 20, 1952, Meany and Tobin contended for the presidency of the AFL. Tobin fell short by one vote on the first informal ballot. He withdrew from the running, convinced that Meany would eventually defeat him. The formal vote taken after his withdrawal was unanimous for Meany. Tobin resigned from the AFL executive council the same day.

Tobin settled in Miami Beach, Florida, in a lavish home built for him by the union (which also supplied him, free of charge, with a car and driver, full-time maid, and reimbursement for all incidental expenses for the rest of his life). In October 1955, he was flown to Indianapolis, Indiana, and hospitalized at St. Vincent's Hospital suffering from hypertension and coronary heart disease. He died from complications related to the two diseases on November 14, 1955. He was interred in Indianapolis.

Tobin left his wife a $5,000 a month income (about $38,900 a month in 2007 dollars). The income was paid from a trust fund of undisclosed size. The trust fund was then divided amongst his children.

== Notes ==
Trade union offices
Preceded by Cornelius Shea	President of the International Brotherhood of Teamsters; 1907–1952	Succeeded by Dave Beck
Preceded by William Bauchop Wilson; Thomas V. O'Connor	American Federation of Labor delegate to the Trades Union Congress; 1911; With: William B. Macfarlane	Succeeded by George L. Berry; John H. Walker
Preceded by William C. Birthright; John B. Haggerty	American Federation of Labor delegate to the Trades Union Congress; 1938; With: Paddy Morrin	Succeeded by Felix H. Knight; James Maloney
Preceded by Felix H. Knight; James Maloney	American Federation of Labor delegate to the Trades Union Congress; 1942	Succeeded by Isidore Nagler; Harold D. Ulrich
Preceded by John Brown Lennon	Treasurer of the American Federation of Labor; 1917–1928	Succeeded by Martin Francis Ryan
Preceded by George McGregor Harrison	Fifth Vice-President of the American Federation of Labor; 1947–1951	Succeeded by Harry C. Bates
Preceded by George McGregor Harrison	Fourth Vice-President of the American Federation of Labor; 1951–1953	Succeeded by Harry C. Bates
Preceded by George McGregor Harrison	Third Vice-President of the American Federation of Labor; 1953–1955	Succeeded by Federation merged
