= Harry C. Bates =

American labor union leader

Harry Clay Bates (November 22, 1882 – April 4, 1969) was an American labor union leader.

Born in Denton, Texas, Bates completed an apprenticeship as a bricklayer in his home town, and in Waco, Texas. He joined the Bricklayers, Masons, and Plasterers International Union in 1900, and in 1910, he was elected as president of its local in Dallas. In 1914, he was additionally elected as president of the Texas State Conference of Bricklayers.

In 1916, Bates began working full-time for the union. In 1933, he became a vice-president of the American Federation of Labor (AFL) and then in 1936, he was elected as president of the bricklayers. Initially, he used his posts to promote the construction of more housing. Over time, he became close with George Meany, president of the AFL, and with Meany and William F. Schnitzler, he negotiated its merger with the Congress of Industrial Organizations, which formed the AFL-CIO. He served as an executive of the new federation.

Bates served on the Wage Stabilization Committee during both World War II and the Korean War. In 1958, he was a delegate to the International Labour Organization conference. He retired from the bricklayers in 1960, but remained an AFL-CIO executive until 1967. Early in 1969, he suffered a heart attack and moved to Florida to recuperate, but he died there in April.

Trade union offices
Preceded by George T. Thornton	President of the Bricklayers, Masons, and Plasterers International Union; 1936–1960	Succeeded by John J. Murphy
Preceded by Patrick E. Gorman; Edward J. Volz	American Federation of Labor delegate to the Trades Union Congress; 1949; With: Dave Beck	Succeeded by J. P. McGurdy; Alex Rose
Preceded by Daniel J. Tobin	Seventh Vice-President of the American Federation of Labor; 1942–1947	Succeeded by William D. Mahon
Preceded by Daniel J. Tobin	Sixth Vice-President of the American Federation of Labor; 1947–1951	Succeeded by William C. Birthright
Preceded by Daniel J. Tobin	Fifth Vice-President of the American Federation of Labor; 1951–1953	Succeeded by William C. Birthright
Preceded by Daniel J. Tobin	Fourth Vice-President of the American Federation of Labor; 1953–1955	Succeeded by Federation merged
