= 1914–1915 Fulton Bag and Cotton Mills strike =

Labor strike in Georgia, US

- Date: May 20, 1914 – May 15, 1915 (11 months, 3 weeks and 4 days)
- Location: Atlanta, Georgia, United States
- Caused by: Firing of employees for unionizing; Poor working and living conditions; Workers' unhappiness with their employment contracts
- Goals: Union recognition; Reinstatement of fired workers; Decreased workhours; Increased wages; Abolition of child labor; Improved living conditions; Removal of employment contracts
- Methods: Picketing; Strike action; Walkout
- Result: Strike ends in failure for union, many workers are not rehired and find work elsewhere

Parties
United Textile Workers of America Local 886	Fulton Bag and Cotton Mills

The 1914–1915 Fulton Bag and Cotton Mills strike was a labor strike involving several hundred textile workers from the Fulton Bag and Cotton Mills in Atlanta, Georgia, United States. The strike, which involved about 500 millworkers, began on May 20, 1914, and ended almost a year later on May 15, 1915, in failure for the strikers.

The Fulton Bag and Cotton Mills was a cotton mill facility located in Atlanta's Cabbagetown neighborhood that began operations in the late 1800s. By the early 1900s, it was one of the largest mills in the American South and the largest industrial employer in the city. However, workers criticized many aspects of the mills, including several unpopular company policies, unsafe working conditions, and the use of child labor in the mills. In 1897, the mills saw two labor strikes that contributed to a greater push for unionization within the mills. In October 1913, following another brief strike, workers organized as Local 886 of the United Textile Workers of America (UTW). In response, the company hired private investigators to infiltrate the mills and report union activity back to the supervisors. On May 20, 1914, in response to the company firing over 100 union members, several hundred millworkers went on strike.

Shortly after the outset of the strike, the company evicted striking families from their company-owned houses. Many found shelter in a boarding house rented out by the UTW. In addition to this, the UTW and the American Federation of Labor (AFL) provided abundant financial and organizational support for the strike, as they saw the success of this strike as an important gateway to further textile organizing in the southern states. The strike attracted many noted labor activists, including Sara Agnes Mclaughlin Conboy and Ola Delight Smith, and many public organizations in the city supported the strike. These groups included the Social Gospel-oriented Men and Religion Forward Movement and the Atlanta Federation of Trades. The former petitioned for federal intervention to arbitrate an end to the strike, while the latter provided several thousand dollars in financial support. However, despite the public support, the company took a hardline stance against the strike and refused to negotiate. Due to the labor surplus in the city at that time, striking workers were easily replaced and production levels quickly returned to pre-strike levels. Additionally, the company hired a private investigation firm to spy on the union, with one spy rising in the ranks of the union and corresponding regularly with the strike leaders. By August, with finances dwindling, the union opened a tent city in lieu of its rented boardinghouse. Several months later, however, the UTW and AFL restated their commitment to the strike and UTW President John Golden even traveled to Atlanta to lead the strike himself. However, by February 1915, Golden had returned to UTW headquarters and many strikers were pessimistic about their chances of securing a favorable outcome. While efforts persisted for several more months, on May 15, the strike was officially called off and the tent city was dismantled. Many of the strikers never worked for Fulton Bag and Cotton again.

Historians contend that the strike was among the first major textile strikes in the Southern United States, with historian Gary M. Fink referring to it as "[t]he southern equivalent of the great 1912 "Bread and Roses" textile strike". Historian Jacquelyn Dowd Hall stated that it was the first strike in the region that received significant support from the AFL and UTW, while historian Joseph B. Atkins considers it a precursor to other textile strike action in the region, including the 1929 Loray Mill strike and the 1934 Textile workers strike. Historians have also discussed reasons for the strike's failure, which they commonly attribute to the labor surplus caused by mass migration to Atlanta from the surrounding area, an emphasis on racial rather than class solidarity among the mills' white workers, a hardline anti-union stance from the company, and a lack of participation from rank and file strikers in strike decision-making.

== Background ==
=== Fulton Bag and Cotton Mills ===
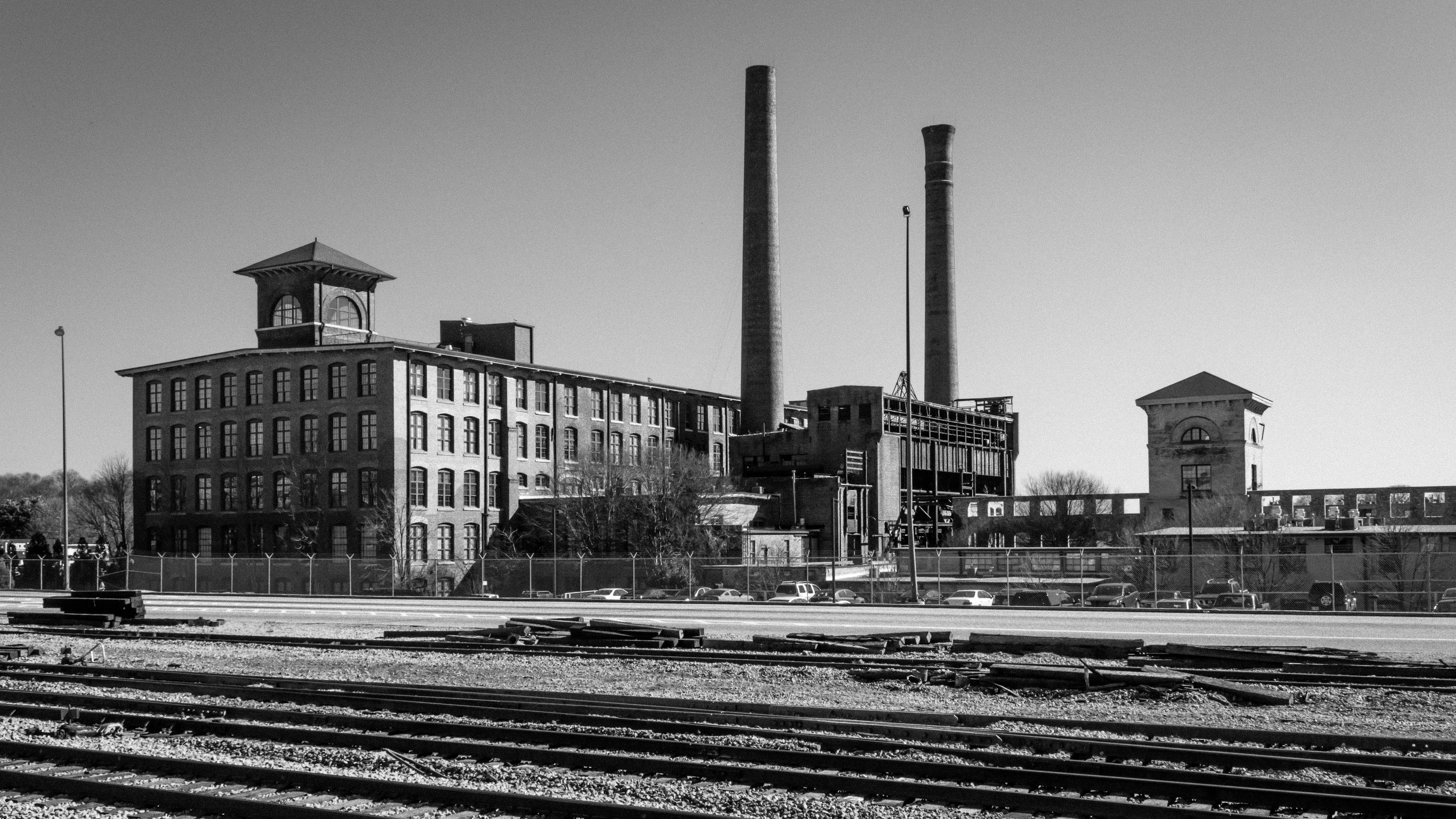
The Fulton Bag and Cotton Mills facility, 2015

In 1868, businessman Jacob Elsas formed the Elsas, May and Company in Atlanta in order to produce paper bags for use in carrying dry goods, such as flour and sugar. By 1870, the company was also producing cotton bags, and in 1876, in an act of vertical integration, Elsas chartered his own textile mill in Atlanta. This mill began operations in 1881, and in 1889, Elsas rechristened his business ventures the Fulton Bag and Cotton Mills, Inc. By this time, the company was the single largest industrial employer in the city. By the early 1900s, the mills were one of the largest in the Southern United States, with the company's facility including four textile factories and several warehouse and machine shops. According to historian Mark K. Bauman, Elsas employed industrial paternalism within his company and the mills. In the Factory Lot neighborhood where the mills were located (later renamed Factory Town and now known as Cabbagetown), the company operated a clinic while Elsas supported a settlement house in the area and offered to build a school near the mills if the government of Atlanta agreed to maintain it. In addition, jobs at the mills offered above-average wages while rent for lodging near the facilities were fairly low.

However, many workers worked long shifts (Note: Until 1905, 66 hours per week was the standard workweek at the mills. This number gradually declined over the next few years, and starting in 1912, the standard was a 60-hour workweek, with 11-hour shifts Monday through Friday and a half-day shift on Saturdays.) in unsafe working conditions, and child labor was prevalent, with many children employed in the mills. Additionally, the company leveled fines against employees for a number of rules violations, further reducing their take-home pay, while the comparatively high cost of living further reduced employees' purchasing power, and while other mills offered employees land to grow crops or raise livestock, Fulton Bag and Cotton did not, requiring employees to purchase all of their food. Factory Town was also notorious for its poor living conditions, with a general lack of sanitation and overcrowding, and outbreaks of diseases such as pellagra and tuberculosis were common. The town had been condemned as a health hazard by the Atlanta Sanitary Department. Elsas also employed industrial espionage in order to maintain control over the mills' operations. Some workers in the late 1800s and early 1900s complained about a general lack of privacy within the mills and an abundance of workplace rules to follow. In addition, workers who had called out sick were sometimes visited by a company doctor to ensure that the worker was not lying about their illness. As part of a labor contract signed between the employees and the mills, Fulton Bag and Cotton took no responsibility for occupational injuries and reserved the right to fire and evict workers without notice, as well as to withhold the employee's last week of pay for quitting without giving the company a five-day notice before leaving. At the time, no other mill in Georgia had such a provision, and while it was disliked by the workers, a 1909 ruling from the Georgia Court of Appeals affirmed its legality. These conditions, among others, all contributed to a high rate of turnover, and the mills were regarded by workers in Atlanta as a "hobo mill".

=== Early labor disputes and unionization at the mills ===
In 1885, workers at the Fulton Cotton and Spinning Company (a precursor to the Fulton Bag and Cotton Company) organized as Local Assembly 4455 of the Knights of Labor. In November of that year, 50 weavers went on strike due to a dispute with management over their wages. The strike affected a total of 150 workers and saw the destruction of some mill machinery, which caused the Knights of Labor to disavow the strike within a week of its beginning. By 1888, Local 4455, having suffered from financial difficulties, ceased to exist.

In 1897, two labor strikes occurred at the mills. The first was caused by the hiring of twenty (Note: Given as "20 to 25" in one source, 25 in another, and "a dozen or so" in yet another.) African American women to work in the mills' folding department in jobs that had traditionally been held by white Americans. (Note: At the time, a majority of the mills' workforce was made up of white women and children.) Elsas had announced their hiring to the rest of the workers in the mills' folding department on August 3. The new hires would be physically segregated from the rest of the employees in the facility and were not hired to replace any existing jobs. The following day, he had the new hires arrive early, but when the white folding workers arrived at 6 a.m., they performed a walkout and were joined by the remainder of the white workers at the mills by 11:00 a.m., causing the mills to shut down. A group of about 1,400 workers gathered outside of the mills, with the police called to maintain order as the situation grew violent. By 3:00 p.m., a mass meeting was held where many of these strikers signed up to join the Textile Workers' Union. (Note: Given as the "Textile Workers Protective Union" in one source. The name given in the text is used in a contemporary report written about the strike.) Elsas, worried about the escalating situation, agreed to negotiate with the strikers, with former U.S. Secretary of the Interior M. Hoke Smith brought in as an arbitrator. On August 5, Elsas agreed to fire the new African American hires, and the strikers returned to work, with some working increased hours as overtime. However, Elsas denied the strikers' demands to fire all African American employees at the mills, instead leaving them employed only in certain departments within the mills. Additionally, Elsas refused a demand that "no member of the Textile Workers' Union or anyone who participated in the strike should be discharged because of their union affiliation, or because they participated in the strike; and that all former employees should be reinstated in their positions". Despite the refusals, the white workers at the mills considered the strike a success, and the white women who had started the walkout were honored by being at the front of that September's Labor Day parade. Additionally, the union began to strengthen its position and affiliated itself with the Atlanta Federation of Trades (AFT), the city's organization of local unions.

Several months after the first strike, management at the mills fired several workers who had acted as strike leaders that August, triggering another strike from the workers. In addition to the firings, the workers were also afraid that their wages were in danger of being decreased and that management might replace them with African American workers. On December 7, with support from the AFT, approximately 1,000 of the 1,200 millworkers went on strike. After a brief meeting with some representatives of the striking workers, Elsas stated his refusal to rehire the fired workers. Starting on the second day of the strike, the company began evicting strikers from company-owned houses, and Elsas performed a lockout. After reopening, non-striking employees were allowed back to work, as were strikers who had abandoned the strike. Additionally, strikebreakers were brought in to replace the strikers. The strike lasted for over a month, but ultimately ended in failure for the strikers by early January, with many of them losing their jobs. The union later dissolved the following year after another attempted strike action by weavers received little support from the rest of the millworkers. Despite the failure for the strikers, the workers at the mills became more active in pushing for labor union representation, with historian Ileen A. DeVault stating that the "workers subsequently became some of Atlanta's most ardent unionists". This was during a time when the labor movement in the United States was experiencing a massive growth, with the American Federation of Labor (AFL) growing from 260,000 members in 1897 to 1,676,200 members by 1904. In Atlanta during this time, many workers joined unions, with the percentage of workers who were unionized in the city greater than the national average. (Note: In 1900, 4 percent of Atlanta's workforce was unionized, compared to 2.8 percent nationwide. By 1920, Atlanta's percentage increased to 12.4 percent, compared to 12.2 percent nationwide.) Also, between 1900 and 1910, the mills resumed hiring of African American women, and by 1914, they accounted for 11 percent of the mills' entire workforce. By 1918, Fulton Bag and Cotton Mills was the largest employer of African American women in Atlanta. However, racial violence continued to serve as a major social issue in Atlanta, reaching a peak less than a decade after the initial strike action with the 1906 Atlanta race riot.

=== Prelude to strike action ===
On October 23, 1913, workers at the mills performed a work stoppage. The event involved about 350 loom fixers and weavers protesting against the firing of a loom fixer and a change in company policy earlier that year that saw an extension in the time needed to state one's intent to quit from five days to six days. The stoppage lasted four days and succeeded in reducing the time needed to give your notice from six days to five days, but failed to get the fired workers rehired. Following the strike, the United Textile Workers of America (UTW), an affiliate union of the AFL, organized a union drive at the mills, and on October 31, the union chartered a local union for the workers, UTW Local 886. At the time, the UTW was attempting to expand their union efforts into the Southern United States, driven primarily by a growth in the textile industry in the area and increased competition in textile organizing in the Northern United States from the more radical Industrial Workers of the World (IWW). They viewed Fulton Bag and Cotton Mills as a good starting place for these efforts based on the location of the mills in the regionally important city of Atlanta as well as the size and militancy of the workforce at the mills. In addition to Atlanta, the UTW was pursuing organizing efforts in several southern cities, while the IWW, in a much smaller scope, was attempting to organize workers in Greenville, South Carolina. The UTW assigned union organizer Charles A. Miles to the union efforts at the mills. Miles had previously been involved in unionization efforts throughout the Midwest and Northeastern United States, but this was his first involvement in organizing in the American South. By early 1914, several hundred millworkers had joined the new local union, but as with previous union organizing at the mills, the company refused to recognize this union.

Through 1913 and into 1914, tensions continued to grow between the workers and management, with many voicing displeasure with new contract policies and increased fines levied by the company. Additionally, several historians note that a wave of antisemitism that had emerged in Atlanta following the 1913 trial of Leo Frank for the murder of Mary Phagan may have contributed to the increased tensions. Speaking about this, historian Joseph B. Atkins stated that "[i]n Atlanta, anti-Semitism contributed to a fetid atmosphere" and that "[m]any Fulton millworkers likely saw in Jacob Elsas what they had come to hate in Leo Frank". However, according to historian Jacquelyn Dowd Hall, while "resentment against Elsas spilled over into the outcry against Leo Frank", "there is no indication that the Fulton Mills walkout was sparked by anti-Semitism". By 1914, there were approximately 1,300 people were employed at the mills, 12 percent of whom were children under the age of 16 and 35 percent of whom were women. By that time, Jacob Elsas had been succeeded as president of the mills by his son, Oscar Elsas. In light of the formation of the union, Elsas contracted the Philadelphia-based Railway Audit and Inspection Company (RA & I, a private investigation firm) to plant undercover agents within the mills to keep tabs on union activities. Additionally, between October 1913 and May 1914, officials within the union alleged that Elsas had fired 104 union members, many of whom had been employed by the mills for a long time beforehand. While Elsas countered that over 300 employees had been fired during that time and that it was irrelevant to him whether they were union members or not, though this statement was challenged by union members. While Miles attempted to discuss these issues with Elsas, Elsas declined.

On May 5, union members met to discuss possible industrial action, but Miles asked the members to postpone any action until after he had met and discussed the situation with UTW officials in Washington, D.C. On May 9, the union met again and voted to approve strike action against the company, but also decided to wait until after Miles had returned to act. On May 15, President S. B. Marks of the Georgia Federation of Labor (a statewide federation of unions that typically represented unions of skilled workers) offered to act as an intermediary between the union and the company, and on May 19, in a secret ballot, union members voted to go on strike at 10 a.m. the next day. Following this, President Marks sent a letter to Elsas requesting a meeting, which was ignored. The following day, a representative of the AFT also sought an audience with Elsas, but was also refused. Following this, several hundred millworkers commenced strike action. (Note: Sources vary on the exact number of strikers who walked out on the first day of the strike. Several sources give the number as "several hundred" workers, while a documentary aired on Georgia Public Broadcasting about the strike gives a more exact number of 500 workers. Historian Gary M. Fink states that sources varied considerably at the time depending on the method of accounting used. Oscar Elsas claimed that only 78 workers went on strike, while organizers of the strike estimated that 450 to 500 had walked out, which rose to 850 by May 25 and continued to increase over the course of the strike. UTW President John Golden stated that initially, 200 workers walked out, but they were joined by several hundred more in the following days and, by the end of the first week of striking, 92 percent of the mills' workforce was on strike. However, Fink states that AFT member Louis Marquardt most likely gives the most accurate estimate, saying that 100 workers had stayed home the day of the strike in anticipation of it, 100 walked out following the announcement, and another 100 workers had put in their quitting notice on May 18 and began striking after that period was up. A 1916 report by the Bureau of Labor Statistics claims that, from the beginning of the strike to Jun 30, 1914, the strike directly affected 450 workers.)

== Course of the strike ==
=== Beginning of the strike and the union's demands ===
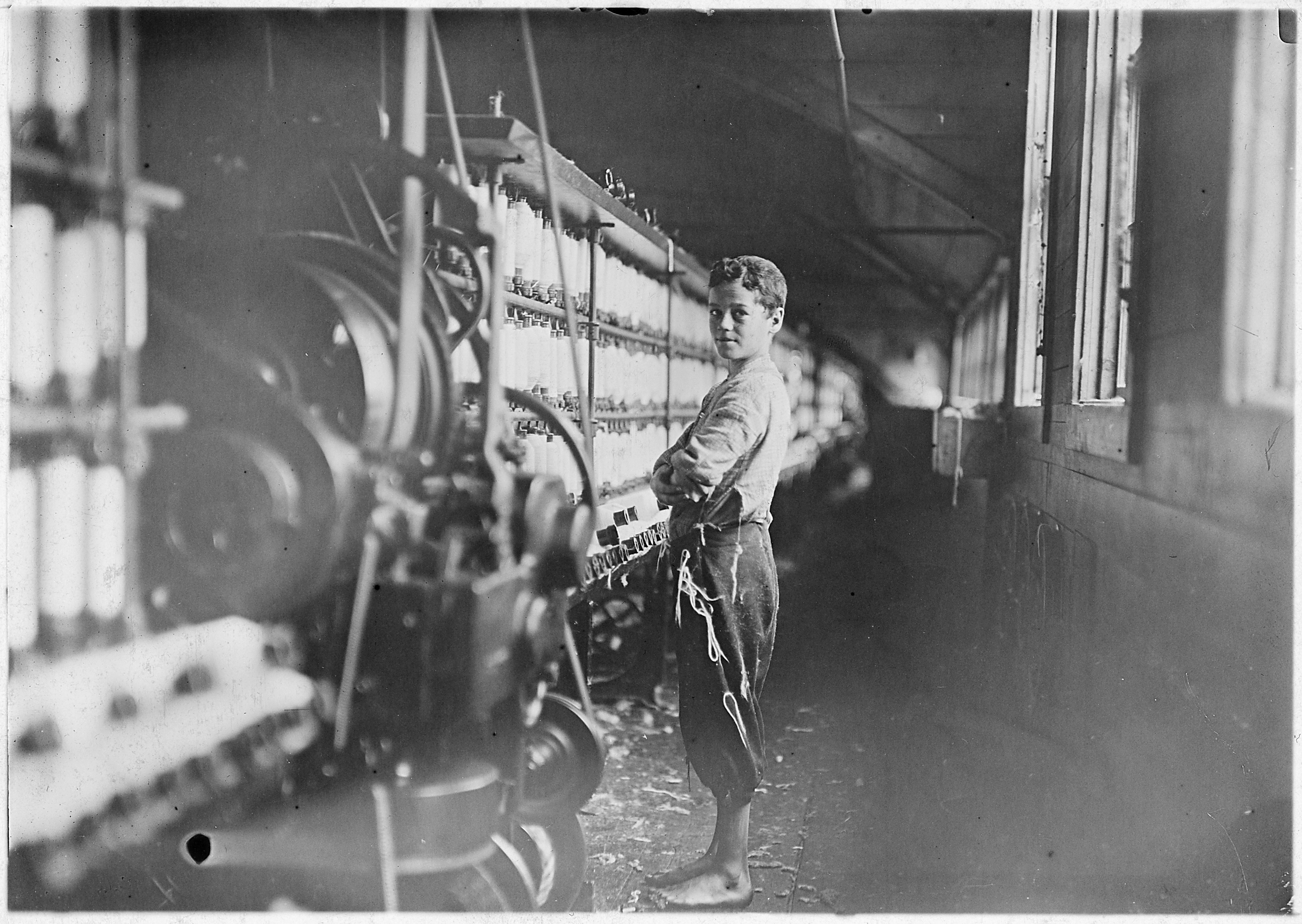
At the time of the strike, children represented approximately 12 percent of the mills' workforce.

The walkout on May 20 consisted primarily of loom fixers and weavers. Picketing commenced shortly thereafter, and several strikers went to the Atlanta Union Station and Terminal Station to inform new arrivals into the city of the strike. Pickets were also staged at an underpass on Boulevard that served as an entryway from the north to the mills. Additionally, strikers visited the homes of other workers to try to convince them to join. Elsas took a hardline stance against the strikers from the beginning, and in some cases even refused to acknowledge the strike, referring to it at one point as a "little disturbance". While the initial cause of the strike concerned the reinstatement of fired union members, the strikers' demands also included reduced workhours, increased pay, improved living conditions in the company-owned housing, and end to both child labor and the employment contract at the mills. With regards to the employment contract, the strikers especially took issue with the required notice in order to receive their last week of pay. Elsas was unwilling to change this policy, and even later stated that that requirement was what had kept more workers from joining the strike. At the time of the strike, the company saved approximately $2,500 annually by keeping wages from employees who had quit without properly notifying the company ahead of time. Additionally, Elsas was unwilling to compromise on the system of fines, arguing that it incentivized workers from making mistakes and promoted productivity. Between 1913 and 1914, the company had collected over $1,500 in fines, compared to the $90.35 that the Atlanta-based Exposition Cotton Mills had collected. Concerning the workhours, union leaders pushed for a reduction from 60 to 54 hours per week, though they were pessimistic about the chances of this being implemented, as the 60-hour workweek was considered fairly standard in the textile industry at that time. However, they considered that it could be a useful bargaining tool in negotiations. On the issue of child labor, state law prohibited anyone under ten years old from working and had certain restrictions on children under the age of fourteen working. However, enforcement of these laws were lax, and many loopholes existed that allowed children to work illegally. Fulton Bag and Cotton, compared to other mills, had a fairly decent reputation in abiding by the law, and Elsas was actually supportive of more stringent child labor laws in the state. However, the union sought to generate more public support for the strike by tying it to the issue of child labor, as the strike coincided with increased activism for the issue. At the time of the strike, there were 144 children working at the Fulton Bag and Cotton Mills, constituting 12 percent of the workforce.

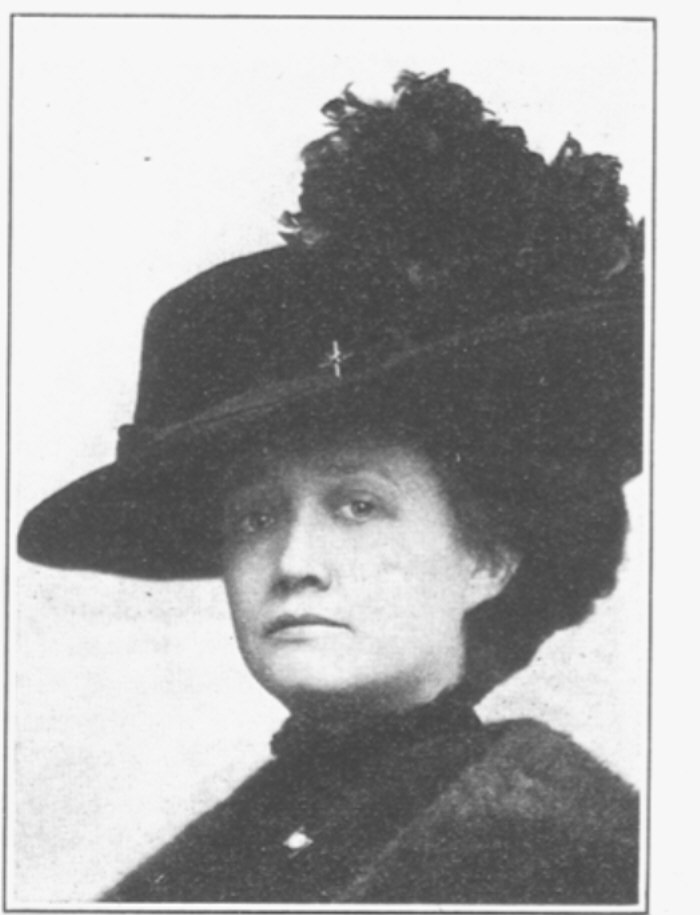
Ola Delight Smith was hired by the union shortly after the strike began.

On May 28, the AFT held a meeting to discuss the strike, wherein they arranged for the local government to not intervene in the strike, which was accomplished because union members held several positions in the local government, Atlanta Chief of Police James Beavers was a friend of one of the strike organizers, and the mayor of Atlanta at the time (James G. Woodward) was also a union member. Additionally, the group agreed to levy a weekly $0.15 due on every member of the organization for the duration of the strike to build up its strike fund. These dues generated approximately $525 per week for the AFT. In addition to these payments, that UTW agreed to provide $500 per week to the strike fund, and additional funds were solicited from local organizations and donors both in Atlanta and nationwide. During the initial months of the strike, the strikers' fund received over $1,500 a week, a large sum for strikes at that time. Shortly after the start of the strike, the UTW sent two more union organizers to help orchestrate the strike: Sara Agnes Mclaughlin Conboy and Mary Kelleher. Conboy had been an activist for the Women's Trade Union League in Boston and was the highest-ranking woman within the UTW's leadership. Miles also convinced the union to hire Ola Delight Smith to help with the strike effort. Smith, known as the "Mother Jones of Atlanta", was a labor activist who had moved to Atlanta several years prior, and served as both an editor for the AFT's Journal of Labor publication and the president of the ladies' auxiliary of the Order of Railroad Telegraphers. Hall referred to her as "a boundary-crossing New Woman" and "the most prominent female member of Atlanta's white labor community", while Fink states that Smith "quickly became the driving force in the strike" and names Miles and Smith as the primary strike leaders. In addition to the UTW representatives, strike leadership also included H. Newborn Mullinax, the president of Local 886 and the only millworker serving as a strike leader.

=== Company evicts strikers ===
Within the first week of striking, Elsas ordered that striking workers and their families be evicted from their company-owned houses. In total, this affected about 218 workers making up 78 families in Factory Town. Deputies from the Fulton County Sheriff's Office, with African American workers hired by the company, began evicting families en masse. Of note, singer Fiddlin' John Carson, who at the time was working at the mills, was evicted along with the rest of his family, who were also millworkers. Carson would later serve as something of a minstrel for the strikers. Led by Smith, strikers and union representatives took ample photographs of the evictions, and these photos and testimonials from evicted strikers were used to generate public sympathy for the strike. Local publications such as The Atlanta Georgian and The Atlanta Journal published many of these images in pro-child labor law articles. Additionally, strikers created and showed movies showcasing their living and working conditions. Photographs of African American men evicting the strikers were widely circulated in an effort, as Hall later stated, to "[appeal] to white racial solidarity". Similar appeals were repeated by the UTW in publications released to other labor unions requesting assistance in the strike, and strike supporters framed the strike as a fight against "white slavery". Many of the evicted workers found lodging at the Textile Hotel, a boarding house the union had rented for strikers in preparation for the evictions. In addition, the union also operated a commissary.

=== Strike continues ===
While the strikers had planned to shut down operations at the factory, this proved unattainable. Within several days, Elsas had leased skilled workers from other mills in the area and Fulton Bag and Cotton Mills was operating at or near the levels it had been operating at before the strike. As a result, the strikers instead pushed to pressure Elsas to bargain with them by garnering public support for their cause. In doing so, strike organizers urged the strikers to remain peaceful and not resort to violence, which could jeopardize their public support. Undercover agents hired by Elsas attempted to counter this public support by gathering unsavory information on strikers and union leaders, painting them as immoral and in the wrong. Within the first few weeks of the strike, the company had ten undercover agents, and both the union hall and Miles's hotel room had been bugged by the RA & I. However, on June 9, the bug at the union hall was discovered, raising suspicions about spies within the union. Additionally, on June 9, Smith discovered two spies who had been active within the union and, while she had intended to have them arrested, both returned to Philadelphia before that could happen. One of the agency's more successful operatives, Harry Preston, managed to stay hidden for much longer and even rose the ranks within the local union, at one point serving as the union's song leader, opening meeting sessions with a singing of "Onward, Christian Soldiers" and leading a rally at the Georgia State Capitol. Preston was so successful in his covert operations that UTW President John Golden once met with him and asked him for his opinion on the strike, and the Massachusetts Federation of Labor treated him as a delegate and guest of honor at one of their meetings.

Despite the spies' efforts, the strike received support from the Men and Religion Forward Movement, a progressive Social Gospel group led by the Evangelical Ministers' Association, which represented the clergy in roughly one hundred Protestant churches in Atlanta. The group criticized Fulton Bag and Cotton for its unsanitary living conditions and poor working conditions and on June 28, strikers and strike supporters held a mass meeting at DeGive's Grand Opera House that saw speakers from the Evangelical Ministers' Association. The event helped renew enthusiasm for the strike, and strikers continued to organize parades through the city to rally additional public support for their cause, often prominently featuring striking women and children in the events. In an attempt to foster arbitration between the union and the company, on July 7, the ministers petitioned the Commission on Industrial Relations (CIR) and the U.S. Department of Labor to send representatives to Atlanta. Both the commission (headed by Frank P. Walsh) and the department (headed by William Bauchop Wilson) were considered fairly sympathetic to organized labor, with Wilson having previously served as a leader of the United Mine Workers of America. Ultimately, the U.S. Federal Government obliged and sent two individuals to Atlanta in an attempt to hold conciliation services between the union and company: W. W. Husband and Herman Robinson of the Department of Labor, with Robinson leading the efforts. The two spent a week in Atlanta and met with Elsas on both July 16 and July 21. In both meetings, they urged him to submit to arbitration, but Elsas steadfastly refused, arguing that the mills were operating fine and that there was nothing he needed to arbitrate with the strikers. The two would later submit a report to Labor Secretary Wilson that was sympathetic to the strike, but stated that there was little the agency could do. Shortly before leaving Atlanta, two representatives of CIR arrived: Alexander M. Daly and Inis Weed. Weed (a progressive labor activist) interviewed with Elsas on July 24, during which Elsas stated that he would be open to arbitration when he felt he might lose the strike, referred to the Men and Religion Forward Movement as being composed of fanatics, and expressed interest in using violence to end the strike, though he said he would not do so because of the women and children on strike. These statements were later widely published in the Atlanta press. Meanwhile, Daly had composed a 49-page report on the strike and conditions at the mills, which, in addition to criticisms of the company's policies and working and living conditions, questioned the legality of the employment contract on the grounds that it lacked mutuality.

=== Trouble within the union ===
However, around the same time that these federal representatives were meeting with Elsas, the union was facing its own issues. Local 886 had continued to accept new members into its ranks, many of whom were transient workers who joined in order to take advantage of the union's benefits. According to Preston, "not a quarter" of the total members of Local 886 had ever worked for the mills. By mid-July, the union had made changes to its acceptance policy in order to screen out these freeloaders, as at the time, over 1,600 people were using the union commissary, costing the union $1,000 per week. Additionally, around the time that Daly and Weed had arrived in Atlanta, Conboy and Kelleher were recalled to New York City by UTW President Golden, which weakened the leadership in the local union. Conboy and Kelleher had recently become at odds with fellow strike leaders Miles and Smith, causing a division amongst the strike's leadership. At the advice of one of the RA & I agents, the company announced that after July 25, no person involved in the strike would ever be employed at the mills again. Also around this time, the UTW feared that the IWW were planning to send operatives to try to take over the strike, as had occurred during the 1912 Lawrence textile strike, but this never occurred.

By August, with production levels matching those before the strike, Elsas defiantly claimed that the strike was over. Also around that same time, citing financial difficulties and a lack of optimism with the strike's progress, the AFT pulled their support. With reduced financial support, the union shifted to housing striking workers in a tent city near the mills, on property owned by a police officer who was sympathetic to the strikers. These tents had been purchased from the Georgia National Guard, which had previously condemned them. While images and stories from the tent city generated increased support and elicited donations from several unions around the country, reports of immoral and illegal activities within the camp generated some negative publicity in the local media. On September 2, a large thunderstorm struck Atlanta and flooded the tent city, but afterwards, the strikers made repairs and cleaned up the area, showing that despite the difficult situation and Preston's predictions, the workers were determined to the continue the strike. On October 21, the UTW held their national convention in Scranton, Pennsylvania, where the labor union planned to enact some changes to the leadership within the Atlanta strike. While Miles was widely criticized for reimbursement agreements he had made with the AFT (which had gone in debt over the course of supporting the strike), the strike itself still garnered wide support from the union, with many still seeing a successful resolution there as the gateway for further unionizing efforts in the region. Following the AFL's convention, (which was held November 9–21 in Philadelphia) UTW President Golden arrived in Atlanta to take charge of the strike and improve the relationship within the strike leadership. To this end, he also sought to squash rumors of a romantic relationship between Miles and Smith. Smith had been the subject of an intense smear campaign during the strike, with company officials attempting repeatedly to catch her in a compromising situation with another man (at the time, Smith was married). During the strike, Smith's husband initiated a divorce, which further damaged the organizer's public reputation.

Golden hoped to reinvigorate the strike and carried out several reforms, including banning alcohol in the tent city, spending hundreds of dollars purchasing shoes for the strikers, covertly sending union agents into the mills to recruit more strikers, and evicting non-strikers. By December, only slightly over 200 people lived in the tent city, of which about 35 were part of the original group of strikers. Additionally, company spies reported rumors that Golden was planning a walkout in January 1915 to coincide with action from the Brotherhood of Railroad Trainmen. That union's labor contract with Southern Railroad was set to expire on January 1, and the plan was that they would refuse to handle business for the mills until a conclusion to the strike was reached.

=== End of the strike ===
Despite the actions taken by Golden, the next several months saw no real progress in winning the strike. An inability to effectively organize within the mills, combined with a labor surplus and a failure with organizing efforts at the nearby Exposition Cotton Mills, led to many seeing the strike as a hopeless situation. On February 1, 1915, Golden returned to UTW's headquarters in Fall River, Massachusetts and was replaced by Conboy and Thomas Reagan, a noted union organizer. Reagan attempted to boost morale and held several rallies, but as time went on, the situation became increasingly hopeless, and on May 15, 1915, 360 days after it had started, the strike ended. The tent city was taken apart, the commissary closed, and the union provided transportation fare for remaining strikers to either return to their homes or to where they had found new employment. Many of the strikers never worked for the mills again, while many workers who had gone on strike had by this time already moved on to new jobs.

== Aftermath and analysis ==
Discussing the aftermath of the strike, Historian Gary M. Fink stated, "the first volley in the American labor movement's campaign to organize the South's major industry did surprisingly little damage to the seemingly impregnable industrial fortress that was southern textiles". Further stressing the size and importance of this strike, he refers to it as "[t]he southern equivalent of the great 1912 "Bread and Roses" textile strike", which had been a watershed moment for organized labor in northern textiles. Offering a slightly different take on the strike, historian Jacquelyn Dowd Hall contends that while the strike was not the "first big strike" for southern textile mills, it was the first such strike in which the UTW and AFL significantly contributed. Historian Joseph B. Atkins considered the strike a forerunner to later textile strikes in the south, including the 1929 Loray Mill strike and the 1934 Textile workers strike, both primarily taking place in North Carolina. While the 1934 strike did see some workers at the Fulton Bag and Cotton Mills participate, there is no clear link between the two.

In discussing the failure of the strike, Fink compares the social and economic environment of the textile industry in the American South to that of the northern states. In particular, Fink notes that, while government authorities and public groups were either neutral or supportive of the strike effort and that national union groups such as the UTW and AFL provided an abundant amount of resources and support, several factors made the strike difficult to win from the start. Notably, he stated that the millworkers were more concerned with racial rather than class solidarity, as evidenced in the successful 1897 strike action, and that this played to undermine the overall solidarity of the strikers. Knowing this, Elsas made no effort at using African American strikebreakers during the strike, for fear of stoking solidarity among their ranks. This sentiment is shared by historian Mark K. Bauman, who stated that "[t]he company successfully used race to counteract class", something that would also occur in the 1916 Atlanta streetcar strike. Bauman, referencing both the Fulton Bag strikes and the 1906 Atlanta race riot, further states that "both the riot and the strikes have been viewed in part as attempts by whites ... to put African Americans "in their places"".

Additionally, the divide between long-term millworkers and the more transient employees created an irreparable rift between the strikers, which was further damaged as more people joined the union despite having never worked at the mills before. The mills' location in Atlanta also meant that there was an abundance of new workers to be hired to replace the strikers. Union efforts were also hurt by a noticeable separation between the union organizers and the rank and file union members, with actual employees not having too much say in the strike's operations compared to organizers like Miles and Smith. Over the course of the strike, the local union had four different presidents, with the first president ultimately resigning after becoming disillusioned with the strike and finding employment at another mill.

While the CIR had collected extensive testimony from many individuals involved in the strike, the U.S. Congress, at the urging of then-Congressman M. Hoke Smith, voted to restrict the publication of this testimony and limit the publication solely to the CIR's final report on the strike. Smith stated that he had "not the slightest respect for anything the Commission did" and criticized the reliability of the testimony, calling it "so much junk". As a result, despite efforts from organized labor groups, only the final report was ever published. Oscar Elsas, who died in 1924, kept an extensive collection of records relating to the strike in a vault at the mills. In late 1985, historians found these company records, including reports from the hired undercover agents, in the basement of the abandoned mills, prompting renewed historical interest and analysis in the strike. Prior to this, reflecting on the legacy of the strike, historian Clifford M. Kuhn said there had been a collective "amnesia" regarding the strike, due in part to the transient nature of the textile workers. Smith, however, later called the strike a pivotal moment in her history as a labor activist while speaking about the event in 1950.

== Sources ==
- Atkins, Joseph B. (2008). Covering for the Bosses: Labor and the Southern Press. Jackson, Mississippi: University Press of Mississippi. ISBN 978-1-60473-325-9.
- Bauman, Mark K. (2005). "Factionalism and Ethnic Politics in Atlanta: German Jews from the Civil War through the Progressive Era". In Feldman, Glenn (ed.). Politics and Religion in the White South. Lexington, Kentucky: University Press of Kentucky. pp. 35–56. ISBN 978-0-8131-7173-9.
- Bauman, Mark K. (2019). A New Vision of Southern Jewish History: Studies in Institution Building, Leadership, Interaction, and Mobility. Foreword by Ronald H. Bayor. Tuscaloosa, Alabama: University of Alabama Press. ISBN 978-0-8173-2018-8.
- Bayor, Ronald H. (1996). Race and the Shaping of Twentieth-century Atlanta. Chapel Hill, North Carolina: University of North Carolina Press. ISBN 978-0-8078-2270-8.
- "Conciliation Work of the Department of Labor, March 14, 1913, to June 6, 1916". Monthly Review of the U.S. Bureau of Labor Statistics. III (1). Bureau of Labor Statistics. July 1916 – via Google Books.
- ""White Slaves" of the Cotton Mills". The Carpenter. Indianapolis: United Brotherhood of Carpenters and Joiners of America: 38. January 1915 – via Google Books.
- "Church Men In Fight Against Child Labor". The Commercial Telegraphers Journal. XII (7). Chicago: Commercial Telegraphers Union of America: 255–256. July 1914 – via Google Books.
- "Urgent Appeal For Aid". The Commercial Telegraphers Journal. XII (12). Chicago: Commercial Telegraphers Union of America: 416. December 1914 – via Google Books.
- "A Race Strike". The Cyclopedic Review of Current History. 7 (3): 649–650. September 30, 1897 – via Google Books.
- DeVault, Ileen A. (2004). United Apart: Gender and the Rise of Craft Unionism. Ithaca, New York: Cornell University Press. ISBN 978-1-5017-2707-8.
- Fink, Gary M. (1991). "Efficiency and Control: Labor Espionage in Southern Textiles". In Zieger, Robert H. (ed.). Organized Labor in the Twentieth-century South. Knoxville, Tennessee: University of Tennessee Press. pp. 13–33. ISBN 978-0-87049-697-4.
- Fink, Gary M. (1993). The Fulton Bag and Cotton Mills Strike of 1914–1915: Espionage, Labor Conflict, and New South Industrial Relations. Ithaca, New York: ILR Press. ISBN 978-1-5017-3455-7.
- "Dreams Never Realized: The Strike of 1914-15". Georgia Public Broadcasting. Archived from the original on October 25, 2020.
- Haberland, Michelle (2015). Striking Beauties: Women Apparel Workers in the U.S. South, 1930-2000. Athens, Georgia: University of Georgia Press. ISBN 978-0-8203-4742-4.
- Hall, Jacquelyn Dowd (1993a). "O. Delight Smith's Progressive Era: Labor, Feminism, and Reform in the Urban South". In Hewitt, Nancy A.; Lebsock, Suzanne (eds.). Visible Women: New Essays on American Activism. Urbana, Illinois: University of Illinois Press. pp. 166–198. ISBN 978-0-252-06333-6.
- Hall, Jacquelyn Dowd (Winter 1993b). "Private Eyes, Public Women: Images of Class and Sex in the Urban South, Atlanta, Georgia, 1913–1915". Atlanta History: A Journal of Georgia and the South. XXXVI (4). Atlanta Historical Society: 24–39 – via Atlanta History Center.
- Hickey, Georgina (2003). Hope and Danger in the New South City: Working-Class Women and Urban Development in Atlanta, 1890-1940. Athens, Georgia: University of Georgia Press. ISBN 978-0-8203-2723-5.
- Huber, Patrick (2008). Linthead Stomp: The Creation of Country Music in the Piedmont South. Chapel Hill, North Carolina: University of North Carolina Press. ISBN 978-0-8078-3225-7.
- Kuhn, Clifford M. (2001). Contesting the New South Order: The 1914-1915 Strike at Atlanta's Fulton Mills. Chapel Hill, North Carolina: University of North Carolina Press. ISBN 978-0-8078-7530-8.
- Maclachlan, Gretchen (Winter 1993). "Atlanta's Industrial Women, 1879–1920". Atlanta History: A Journal of Georgia and the South. XXXVI (4). Atlanta Historical Society: 16–23 – via Atlanta History Center.
- Marshall, F. Ray (1967). Labor in the South. Cambridge, Massachusetts: Harvard University Press. ISBN 978-0-674-50700-5.
- Melnick, Jeffrey Paul (2000). Black-Jewish Relations on Trial: Leo Frank and Jim Conley in the New South. Jackson, Mississippi: University Press of Mississippi. ISBN 978-1-60473-595-6.
- "Negro Help Causes a Strike". The New York Times. August 5, 1897. ISSN 0362-4331. Archived from the original on September 9, 2021.
- Ross, Steven J. (1998). Working-Class Hollywood: Silent Film and the Shaping of Class in America. Princeton, New Jersey: Princeton University Press. ISBN 978-0-691-21464-1.
- Trotter, Joe William Jr. (2019). Workers on Arrival: Black Labor in the Making of America. Oakland, California: University of California Press. ISBN 978-0-520-37751-6.
