= OPCMIA Cement Masons and Plasterers Local 528 =

OPCMIA Cement Masons and Plasterers Local 528 is a cement masonry local in Seattle Washington.

== General Information ==
Located in Seattle, WA and chartered February 24, 1941 Cement Mason's Local 528 is part of the oldest building trades union, the Operative Plasterers and Cement Masons International Association (OPCMIA).

Local 528 currently has over 1,600 members. Over 1300 are cement masons and over 300 are plasterers. 236 are cement mason apprentices, and approximately 56 are plasterer apprentices.

The Seattle-based Local 528 has a jurisdiction that covers nearly all of Western Washington from the Cascade Mountains to the Pacific Ocean, and from the Canada–US border to all but three counties on the Columbia River. The jurisdiction is extended to some Eastern Washington counties from a merger in 2005 between Plasterers Local 77 and Cement Masons Local 528.

In 1942 the local Won a Blue Ribbon for World War II fundraising efforts to support American forces overseas.

== Strikes ==
- 1919 Seattle General Strike
- 1919 Cement Mason Trade Strike
- 1958
- 1960
- 1966
- 1974
- 1980
