= Edward McGivern =

Edward McGivern may refer to:

- Edward J. McGivern (1871–1927), American labor union leader
- Ed McGivern (1874–1957), American shooter
