= Mining Department (AFL) =

20th century labor cooperative

The Mining Department was a semi-autonomous department of the American Federation of Labor (AFL).

== History ==
In the early 20th century, several unions represented workers in the mining industry in the United States and Canada, and there was interest in encouraging co-operation between them. The Western Federation of Miners re-affiliated with the AFL in 1911, and this spurred the formation of a mining department of the AFL.

The department was founded on February 8, 1912, at a conference in Indianapolis. Among its early plans was a joint recruitment campaign, in Utah, New Mexico, and southern Colorado. In 1914, the post of president of the department became salaried, and an office was opened in the AFL Building in Washington DC.

The department was disbanded in 1922, due to disagreements on strategy between the leadership of the AFL and the United Mine Workers of America union.

== Affiliates ==
Affiliates included:

- Amalgamated Association of Iron, Steel and Tin Workers
- International Association of Bridge and Structural Ironworkers
- International Association of Machinists
- International Brotherhood of Steam Shovel and Dredgemen
- International Union of Mine, Mill and Smelter Workers
- United Mine Workers of America

== Leadership ==
=== Presidents ===
1912: Charles Moyer
1912: John Phillip White
1914: James Lord

=== Secretary-Treasurers ===
1912: Edwin Perry
1912: Ernest Mills
