= Timothy Healy (trade unionist) =

Irish-American trade union leader and political activist

Timothy J. Healy
- Timothy "Tim" Healy, American trade union official, as he appeared during the summer of 1916.
- Born: March 23, 1863; County Cork, Ireland
- Died: July 21, 1930 (aged 67)
- Occupation: trade union leader

Timothy J. Healy (1863–1930) was an Irish-American trade union leader and political activist. Healy is best remembered as the longtime head of the International Brotherhood of Stationary Firemen and Oilers (IBSFO), a trade union for steam boiler operators.

== Biography ==
=== Early years ===
Timothy Healy was born on March 25, 1863, in County Cork, Ireland. Healy was the son of a farmer and was educated in Irish common schools. As a young man Healy worked as a boiler stoker aboard transatlantic ships, making the crossing 38 times in all.

=== Career ===
Tim Healy addressing a crowd during a New York City streetcar strike, Union Square, Sept. 14, 1916.

Healy emigrated to the United States in 1888, settling in New York City. In America Healy first worked as a steam boiler operator as a member of an independent trade union called the Eccentric Firemen of New York City, affiliated with the Knights of Labor, gaining a leadership position in the union.

In 1898, Healy organized the engineering department of the New York Naval Militia in conjunction with its expansion during the Spanish–American War. He was an unsuccessful candidate for election to the New York City Board of Aldermen in 1900.

Healy lead the Eccentric Firemen into the newly founded affiliate of the American Federation of Labor (AF of L), the International Brotherhood of Stationary Firemen and Oilers (IBSFO), as Local 56 of that organization.

Healy was elected vice president of the Stationary Firemen in 1902 and as president the following year. He would remain in office continuously as chief of the Stationary Firemen until 1927.

In addition to his union position, Healy served as deputy Sheriff of New York County, New York from 1903 to 1904 and Coroner of New York City for Manhattan from 1913 to 1918. Healy was the last elected coroner of New York County, winning office in 1917 and serving until the position was abolished the subsequent year.

Healy was prominent in New York City municipal politics and was a close associate of Mayor John Purroy Mitchel, elected to office in 1914. Following the outbreak of World War I and American entry into the European conflagration, Healy offered his services to the city and was named chairman of the New York City Recruiting Committee.

Healy was also a member of the governing executive committee of the National Civic Federation from 1907 to 1923. He was an important figure in the American labor movement, being selected as the AF of L's delegate to the British Trades Union Congress in 1920. He was also a delegate to the 1924 Congress of International Transport Workers, held in Hamburg, Germany.

Healy was a staunch adherent of formal diplomatic recognition of the Soviet Russia during the early 1920s, a position which simultaneously brought him into close relations with William Z. Foster and his Trade Union Educational League (TUEL), while at the same time alienating him from Samuel Gompers and the leadership of the AF of L. This conflict came to a head at the AF of L's 1922 annual convention, held in Cincinnati, at which Healy's attempt to win support for recognition was defeated.

=== Death and legacy ===
Tim Healy died on July 21, 1930, in Ocean Grove, New Jersey. He was 64 years old at the time of his death.

At a dinner held in his honor in 1927, Healy was lauded by United States Secretary of Labor James J. Davis, who asserted that "No labor leader has ever had more friend than Healy for the reason that he has given labor a new dignity, a new title to public respect."

== Works ==
- "Report of President Healy," Stationary Firemen's Magazine, vol. 13, no. 7 (May 1912), pp. 2–4.

Trade union offices
Preceded by Joseph W. Morton	President of the International Brotherhood of Stationary Firemen; 1903–1927	Succeeded by John F. McNamara
Preceded by William Hutcheson; J. J. Hynes	American Federation of Labor delegate to the Trades Union Congress; 1920; With: Sara Conboy	Succeeded by William J. Spencer; James J. Forrester
