= James Lord (unionist) =

English-born American labor unionist

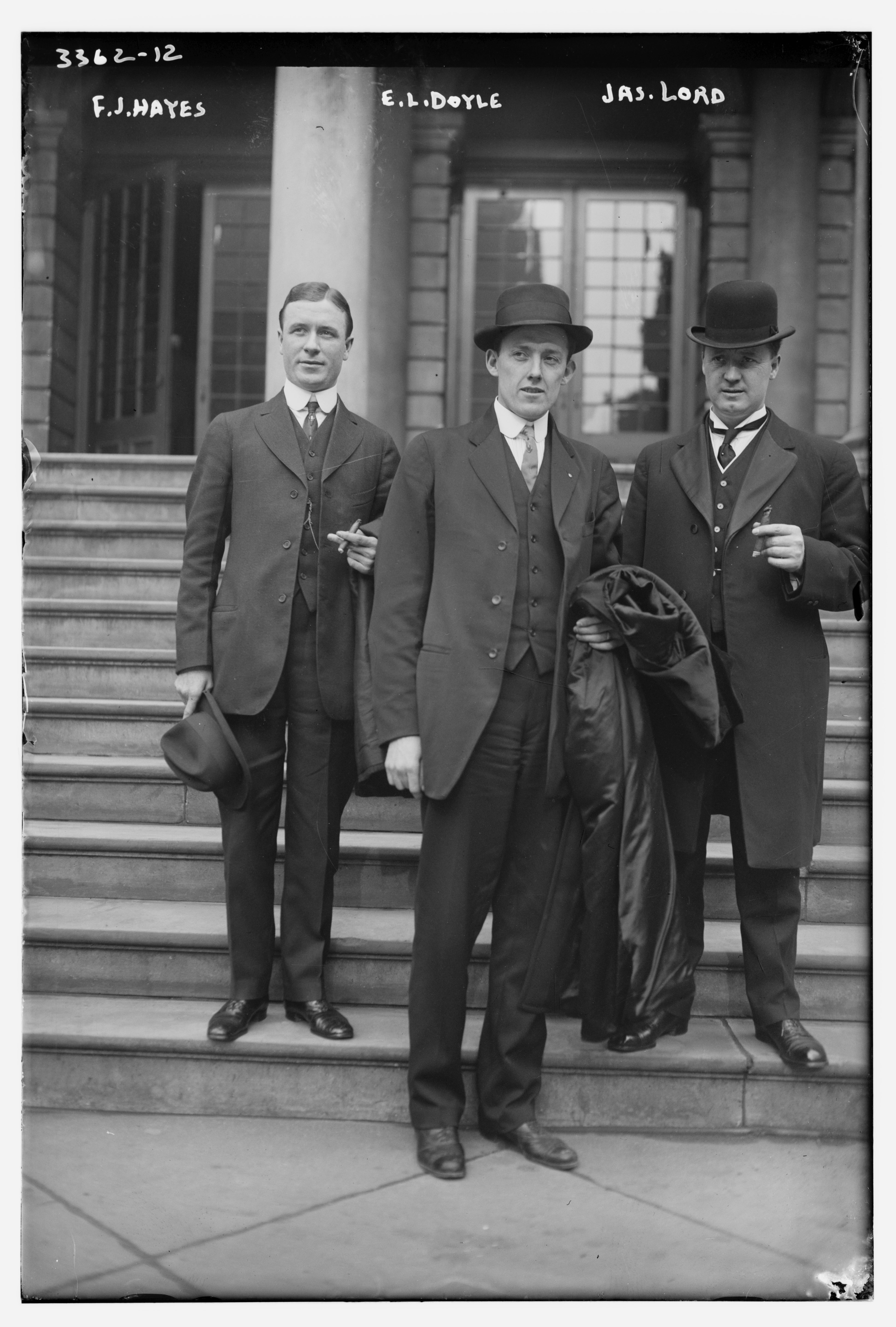
Edward L. Doyle (center), with Frank Hayes (left, President of the United Mine Workers of America), James Revell Lord (right, miner and union official)

James Lord (January 30, 1878 – March 13, 1962) was an English-born American labor unionist.

Born in England, Lord emigrated to the United States in 1888. He settled in Farmington, Illinois, where he worked at a colliery, and joined the United Mine Workers of America. In 1912, he was elected as vice-president of the union' District 12, covering Illinois.

In 1914, the presidency of the Mining Department of the American Federation of Labor (AFL) was made full-time and salaried, and Lord was appointed to the post. During World War I, he additionally served on the Committee on Labor of the Advisory Commission of the Council of National Defense. In 1918, he was made treasurer of the new Pan-American Federation of Labor.

The Mining Department was dissolved in 1922, and Lord became an organizer for the AFL, based on the West Coast. By 1923, his mental health was poor, and his wife had him committed.

About 1929, Lord moved to Lafayette, Colorado where he died in 1962.

Trade union offices
Preceded by John Phillip White	President of the Mining Department; 1914–1922	Succeeded by Department abolished
Preceded by William D. Mahon; Matthew Woll	American Federation of Labor delegate to the Trades Union Congress; 1917; With: John Golden	Succeeded by William J. Bowen; Samuel Gompers
