= International Brotherhood of Stationary Firemen =

Stationary Firemen
- International Brotherhood of Stationary Firemen and Oilers
- Merger: National Conference of Firemen and Oilers/SEIU Local 32BJ
- Founded: Dec. 18, 1898
- Dissolved: July 1, 2008
- Location: United States
- Key people: Timothy Healy

The International Brotherhood of Stationary Firemen (IBSF) was an American trade union established in 1898 and affiliated with the American Federation of Labor (AF of L). The union was established as a mechanism for advancing the collective interests of workers engaged in the operation of steam boilers. Originally limited to stationary firemen, in 1919 the AF of L expanded the organization's jurisdictional mandate to oilers and boiler room helpers, and the name was changed to International Brotherhood of Stationary Firemen and Oilers (IBSFO).

The use of the term "stationary firemen" for boiler operator gradually became archaic and the commonly used name of the union became for years the International Brotherhood of Firemen and Oilers (IBFO). This change was formally recognized by the group at its convention of 1956 when the organizational name was officially changed.

In 1994 negotiations took place between the IBFO and the large Service Employees International Union (SEIU) which resulted a close affiliation with the boiler operators henceforth known as the National Conference of Firemen and Oilers (NCFO). The NCFO became a "multi-state affiliate" of SEIU Local 32BJ in 2008 and continues as such today.

== Organizational history ==
=== Establishment ===
Stationary Firemen at their posts in a large coal-fired boiler room. From the cover of Stationary Firemen's Journal in 1912.

On December 18, 1898, five delegates to the 18th Annual Convention of the American Federation of Labor (AF of L) got together to discuss issues of common concern to boiler operations workers. The result of this meeting was the formation of a new craft union affiliated to the AF of L, the International Brotherhood of Stationary Firemen (IBSF).

In 1919 the AF of L expanded the IBSF's jurisdictional mandate to oilers and boiler room helpers, and the name of the union was accordingly changed to International Brotherhood of Stationary Firemen and Oilers (IBSFO). A further jurisdictional expansion to include railroad roadhouse and station employees took place in the first years of the 1920s and the union became affiliated with the AF of L's Railway Employees' Department.

Within the AF of L the Brotherhood of Stationary Firemen and Oilers was primarily attached through the federation's Metal Trades Department. The union was also affiliated with the Trades and Labour Congress of Canada.

The Brotherhood of Stationary Firemen was organized for the collective support of workers engaged in the operation of fixed ("stationary") boilers for the provision of power and heat, as opposed to those moving boilers providing propulsion for locomotives and steamships, which fell under the jurisdiction of other craft unions.

=== Development ===
During the early years of the electrical generation industry, which were marked by relatively small and isolated individual generating plants, the Brotherhood of Stationary Firemen and its sibling rival, the International Union of Steam and Operating Engineers (IUSOE), played a relatively large part — comparable in jurisdictional status to the International Brotherhood of Electrical Workers (IBEW). Over time this position of importance was largely lost, however, in part due to expanding use of hydroelectric plants as well as growth in size and jurisdictional authority of the IBEW — which by the end of the 1920s had become one of the four strongest unions affiliated with the AF of L.

The Brotherhood of Stationary Firemen and Oilers was swept by controversy in 1924 by allegations that its national Vice President and editor of its monthly magazine, Robert William Beattie, had for 12 years worked as a spy on behalf of a private detective agency. Beattie had formerly been a functionary of the Central Labor Union of Pittsburgh, Pennsylvania, as well as the head of the leading labor bank in that city, the Brotherhood Savings and Trust Company. Beattie was expelled from membership in the union as a spy based upon these charges.

=== Official organ ===
The IBSFO published a monthly magazine, which originated in 1899 in Chicago as Stationary Firemen's Journal. The publication later changed its name to Firemen and Oilers Journal.

=== Name change of 1956 ===
Although commonly known by the name for many years previous, at its 1956 convention the IBSFO formally changed its name to the International Brotherhood of Firemen and Oilers (IBFO).

=== Affiliation agreement of 1995 ===
On November 20, 1994, a special convention was convened in Washington, DC between delegates of the IBFO and those of the large-and-growing Service Employees International Union (SEIU). A decision was made to formally unite these two labor unions, effective February 1, 1995. The IBFO henceforth became known as the National Conference of Firemen and Oilers, which in July 2008 became a "multi-state affiliate of SEIU" known as Local 32BJ.

== See also ==
- SEIU 32BJ

== Annual membership ==
Year	Membership	President	Source
1898		Joseph W. Morton	
1898		Joseph W. Morton	
1899		Joseph W. Morton	
1900		Joseph W. Morton	
1901		Joseph W. Morton	
1902		Joseph W. Morton	
1903		Timothy Healy	
1904		Timothy Healy	
1905		Timothy Healy	
1906		Timothy Healy	
1907		Timothy Healy	
1908		Timothy Healy	
1909		Timothy Healy	
1910		Timothy Healy	
1911		Timothy Healy	
1912		Timothy Healy	
1913		Timothy Healy	
1914		Timothy Healy	
1915		Timothy Healy	
1916	17,000	Timothy Healy	Solon DeLeon and Nathan Fine (eds.), American Labor Year Book, 1923-24, pg. 49.
1917		Timothy Healy	
1918	17,100	Timothy Healy	Solon DeLeon and Nathan Fine (eds.), American Labor Year Book, 1923-24, pg. 49.
1919		Timothy Healy	
1920	29,600	Timothy Healy	Solon DeLeon and Nathan Fine (eds.), American Labor Year Book, 1923-24, pg. 49.
1921	35,000	Timothy Healy	Solon DeLeon and Nathan Fine (eds.), American Labor Year Book, 1923-24, pg. 49.
1922	25,000	Timothy Healy	Solon DeLeon and Nathan Fine (eds.), American Labor Year Book, 1923-24, pg. 49.
1923	12,500	Timothy Healy	Solon DeLeon and Nathan Fine (eds.), American Labor Year Book, 1923-24, pg. 49.
1924	9,000	Timothy Healy	Solon DeLeon and Nathan Fine (eds.), American Labor Year Book, 1927, pg. 72.
1925	10,000	Timothy Healy	Solon DeLeon and Nathan Fine (eds.), American Labor Year Book, 1927, pg. 72.
1926	8,000	Timothy Healy	Solon DeLeon and Nathan Fine (eds.), American Labor Year Book, 1927, pg. 72.
1927	9,000	Timothy Healy	Nathan Fine (ed.), American Labor Year Book, 1930, pg. 60.
1928	8,300	John F. McNamara	Nathan Fine (ed.), American Labor Year Book, 1930, pg. 60.
1929	9,500	John F. McNamara	Nathan Fine (ed.), American Labor Year Book, 1932, pg. 30.
1930	9,000	John F. McNamara	Nathan Fine (ed.), American Labor Year Book, 1932, pg. 30.
1931	9,100	John F. McNamara	Nathan Fine (ed.), American Labor Year Book, 1932, pg. 30.
1932		John F. McNamara	
1933		John F. McNamara	
1934		John F. McNamara	
1935		John F. McNamara	
1936		John F. McNamara	
1937		John F. McNamara	
1938		John F. McNamara	
1939	27,000	John F. McNamara	Harry D. Wolf in 20th Century Fund, How Collective Bargaining Works. (1942), pg. 332.
1940		John F. McNamara	
