= William Hutcheson =

William Hutcheson (February 6, 1874 – October 20, 1953) was the leader of the United Brotherhood of Carpenters and Joiners of America from 1915 until 1952. A conservative craft unionist, he opposed the organization of workers in mass production industries such as steel and automobile manufacturing into industrial unions. Under his administration the Carpenters Union grew by taking an aggressive stance toward other trade unions that claimed work that Carpenters also claimed. He took his union out of the American Federation of Labor's Building Trades Department on several occasions when he was displeased by its ruling on jurisdictional disputes involving the Carpenters.

Hutcheson was one of the most vigorous exponents of craft unionism within the AFL, who not only opposed the organizing of industrial workers, but tried to prevent others from undertaking it. That conflict over the proper role of unions was symbolized by the famous punch — or shove — that John L. Lewis delivered at the AFL's convention in Atlantic City in 1935 after Hutcheson interrupted a speech by a representative of the committee that was attempting to organize tire factory workers with a point of order. Lewis responded that Hutcheson's point of order was "small potatoes," to which Hutcheson replied "I was raised on small potatoes, that is why I am so small." Lewis left the podium and, after some more words, knocked Hutcheson down, then relit his cigar and returned to the rostrum. The incident — which was also "small potatoes," but very memorable — helped cement Lewis' image in the public eye as someone willing to fight for workers' right to organize. Lewis led the United Mine Workers of America and a number of other unions out of the AFL to form the Congress of Industrial Organizations two years later.

Hutcheson was highly conservative in his politics as well. He supported Republican candidates from Harding to Eisenhower and was a vocal opponent of the New Deal, calling Roosevelt a "dictator" in 1936 and accusing him of condoning communist subversion by refusing to support Martin Dies' House Un-American Activities Committee in 1940. He opposed federal legislation during the Great Depression that would have reduced the working day to six hours and provided unemployment insurance and campaigned against Harry S. Truman's proposal for national health insurance as "socialized medicine". He was also a member of America First, the organization headed by Charles Lindbergh that opposed any United States support for Britain or the Soviet Union in the years before Pearl Harbor.

Hutcheson did not allow for opposition to his administration: he revoked the charters of locals that did not follow his directions or that he believed to be "communistic". He took nearly 100,000 sawmill workers into the union in 1935, but only as second class members with no voting rights. His treatment of those locals and the union's failure to deliver effective leadership during several strikes in the Northwest led to their departure to join the CIO several years later. He did not permit the nomination of candidates to oppose him at one of the union's conventions and named his own son First Vice-President in 1938.

Hutcheson's outspoken politics may have played a role in the Roosevelt administration's attempt to convict Hutcheson and other union leaders for criminal violations of the Sherman Act in 1940. The government claimed that the union's traditional methods of protecting its members' work — jurisdictional strikes, resistance to work-displacing technology, and featherbedding — were illegal restraints of trade. The United States Supreme Court upheld the district court's dismissal of the indictment in the first prosecution brought by the government in United States v. Hutcheson, 312 U.S. 219 (1941), ending any further prosecutions of Carpenters officials.

Hutcheson retired in 1952. His son, Maurice Hutcheson, succeeded him.

== External references ==
- Bill Hutcheson's Convention

Trade union offices
Preceded by James Kirby	President of the United Brotherhood of Carpenters and Joiners of America; October 8, 1915 – 1951	Succeeded by Maurice Hutcheson
Preceded by Samuel Gompers; William J. Bowen	American Federation of Labor delegate to the Trades Union Congress; 1919; With: J. J. Hynes	Succeeded by Sara Conboy; Timothy Healy
Preceded by Albert Adamski; Edward J. Evans	American Federation of Labor delegate to the Trades Union Congress; 1926; With: Frank Farrington	Succeeded by Michael Casey; John Coefield
Preceded by Frank Duffy	First Vice-President of the American Federation of Labor; 1939–1953	Succeeded by Matthew Woll
