= William J. Bowen =

American labor union leader

William J. Bowen (1868 – July 27, 1948) was an American labor union leader.

Born in Albany, New York, Bowen became an apprentice bricklayer at the age of 13. In 1890, he joined the Bricklayers and Masons International Union. He was elected as business manager of his local the following year, and as president in 1895. In 1900, he was elected as assistant general secretary of the international union, and then in 1901 as first vice-president of the union.

In 1904, Bowen was elected as president of the bricklayers. The union was struggling and financially insolvent, but Bowen was able to stabilize it, setting up both a death benefit fund and a relief fund. In 1916, he affiliated the union to the American Federation of Labor (AFL), within which he worked closely with Samuel Gompers.

Bowen served on the government's labor commission during World War I. In 1918, he was the AFL delegate to the British Trades Union Congress. After the war, he backed the union's construction of a brickworks in El Paso. He retired as union president in 1928, but remained chair of its board of trustees. In this role, he was a leading critic of communists in the labor movement. He died in 1948.

Trade union offices
Preceded by George G. Gubbins	President of the Bricklayers, Masons, and Plasterers International Union; 1904–1928	Succeeded by George T. Thornton
Preceded by John Golden; James Lord	American Federation of Labor delegate to the Trades Union Congress; 1918; With: Samuel Gompers	Succeeded by J. J. Hynes; William Hutcheson
