= Ola Delight Smith =

American telegrapher, journalist, and labor activist (1880–1958)

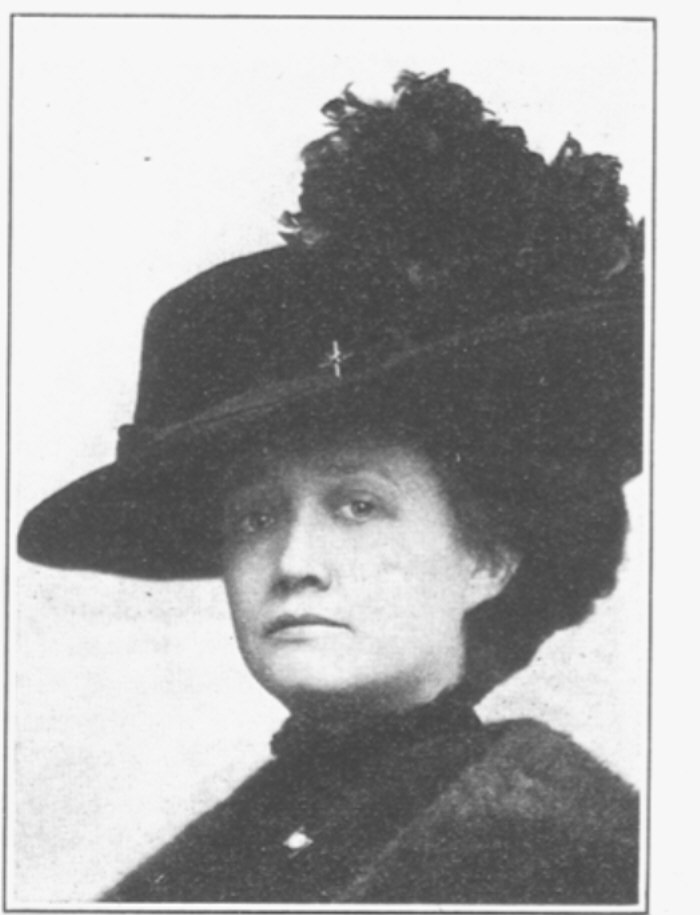
Ola Delight Smith. Source: Railroad Telegrapher, May 1911, 1018

Ola Delight Lloyd Smith (January 21, 1880 – December 5, 1958) was an American telegrapher, journalist, and labor activist.

== Biography ==
Ola Delight Lloyd was born in Mercer County, Illinois, in 1880. Her father, John Alva Lloyd, was a farmer; her mother, Celeste Crawford "Lettie" Long, died when Ola was nine. The family moved many times during her childhood, residing for various periods of time in Mississippi, Alabama, Georgia, Nebraska, Iowa, and Wisconsin.

=== Telegraphic career ===
While the family was living in Epes, Alabama, Ola became interested in telegraphy and used a practice set at home to learn Morse code. She took a telegraphy course at the Alabama Polytechnic Institute for Girls in Montevallo (now known as the University of Montevallo) and began working as a telegrapher, first for the Queen and Crescent Route and later for the Postal Telegraph Company. In 1901, Ola married Edgar B. Smith, a traveling salesman, and the couple moved to Birmingham, Alabama, where she managed a Western Union office. They later moved to Gainesville, Georgia, where Ola again worked for the Postal Telegraph; she joined the Commercial Telegraphers Union of America (CTUA) in 1904. The CTUA had been formed in 1902 to represent the interests of commercial telegraphers. In 1906, she also joined the Order of Railroad Telegraphers (ORT), which had been formed in 1886 to represent telegraphers who worked for the railroads.

In 1907, Ola and her husband moved to Atlanta, Georgia. The CTUA declared a nationwide strike in August 1907 after several union members were dismissed by Western Union for participating in union activities. Ola Delight Smith played an active role in the strike, which ended in defeat for the union in November 1907. As a result, she was blacklisted by Western Union and was unable to find employment as a telegrapher.

To supplement her husband's meager and erratic income, she entered into a variety of ventures, including running a boarding house, writing business letters, and providing general secretarial services. She continued to participate in union activities, and in May 1908 organized the Dixie Twin Order Telegraphers' Club in order to coordinate social activities involving both the CTUA and the ORT. She organized a telegraphers' convention that was held in Atlanta in May 1909, and served as president of the ladies' auxiliary of the Twin Order Telegraphers until 1913. She also served as the CTUA representative to the Atlanta Federation of Trades and the Georgia Federation of Labor.

=== Work as Labor Journalist and Organizer ===
In 1906, she had begun writing for the Atlanta Journal of Labor, published by the Atlanta Federation of Trades, and eventually became an associate editor. She wrote columns on a variety of subjects, focusing on the need for organized labor and women's role in labor unions. She became an advocate for the rights of children, and served as the Georgia Federation of Labor's delegate to the Southern Conference on Women and Child Labor.

In 1914, Atlanta textile workers belonging to the United Textile Workers Union went on strike against the Fulton Bag and Cotton Mills to protest poor working conditions and the employment of children in the mills. Ola Delight Smith became involved as a labor organizer. She took photographs to document working conditions and to illustrate the condition of children working in the mills. Her activities came to the attention of the mill owners, who hired operatives to spy on her and report on her activities.

The mill owners began to clandestinely circulate attacks on her reputation, resulting in her being dismissed as strike leader in November 1914. Her husband filed for divorce at the same time, aided by a lawyer who represented the mills. The strike finally ended in defeat for the UTW in 1915.

=== Later life ===
Ola Delight Smith left Atlanta and resumed her work as a telegrapher, operating for the Atchison, Topeka, and Santa Fe Railway in Texas. In 1918, she married Almond Cook in Oklahoma, and the couple eventually relocated to The Dalles, Oregon. There, Almond Cook began to exhibit signs of mental instability, due to painter's colic (lead poisoning) from years of working as a painter. When he disappeared in the early 1920s, Ola moved to Portland, Oregon, and took up residence in the Portland Young Women's Christian Association (YWCA) in hopes of finding him. Her search proved unsuccessful, and her stay at the YWCA left her impoverished. However, she was finally able to obtain work as a telegrapher in Portland, first with the Postal Telegraph Company and later with Western Union.

She began to develop health problems in the 1920s, and was operated on for several types of cancer, including skin cancer in 1928. After being told by doctors that her condition was incurable, she began to treat herself with a home remedy recommended by neighbors, and pronounced herself cured in an affidavit she wrote in 1938. Her illnesses did not interrupt her work at Western Union, and she continued there until her retirement at age 70 in 1950. In a letter written in 1956, she expressed gratitude for the passage of the Wagner Act in 1935, which forbade blacklisting and made it possible for telegraphers who had been blacklisted to return to work: "The Wagner Act struck from my ankles the shackles which bound me to the Blacklist and the Yellow-Dog Contracts. Again I was free to work in organized labor."

She was a charter member of Local 92 of the CTUA in Portland, and helped organize the United Railway Labor Political League and the Committee on Labor Education. She was also chair of the Third Congressional District Committee of the Women's Division of the Labor League for Political Education. Remembering the support that the YWCA had provided her in her search for her missing husband, she became a member of the YWCA Board of Directors in 1954. In 1956, the Portland Central Labor Council celebrated her 76th birthday, noting her "50 years of selfless devotion and service to the labor movement."

Ola Delight Smith Cook died on December 5, 1958, after a brief illness. She bequeathed her estate to the Oregon Central Labor Council to establish a library for labor research. Her personal papers can be found in the Oregon Historical Society in Portland.
