= J. J. Hynes =

Labor union leader

John Joseph Hynes (October 25, 1872 – November 30, 1938) was a Newfoundland-born American labor union leader.

Born in St John's, Newfoundland, Hynes emigrated to the United States in 1887. He settled in Boston, where he became a sheet metal worker. In his spare time, he was a keen amateur boxer, who won the New England Championship.

Hynes joined the Amalgamated Sheet Metal Workers' International Alliance. In 1906 and 1907, he served as president of the Boston Central Labor Union. In 1909, he was elected as general organizer of the Sheet Metal Workers, and then in 1913 won election as the union's president. He also served as a vice-president of the Building Trades, Metal Trades and Railway Employes' departments of the American Federation of Labor.

Hynes died in 1938, still in office.

Trade union offices
| Preceded by Michael O'Sullivan | President of the Sheet Metal Workers' International Association; 1913–1938 | Succeeded by Robert Byron |
| Preceded by Samuel Gompers; William J. Bowen | American Federation of Labor delegate to the Trades Union Congress; 1919; With: William Hutcheson | Succeeded by Sara Conboy; Timothy Healy |
