= Commercial Telegraphers Union of America =

Former trade union of the United States

The Commercial Telegraphers Union of America (CTUA) was a United States labor union formed to promote the interests of commercial telegraph operators.

Logo, Commercial Telegraphers Union of America. Source: Commercial Telegraphers Journal, June 1910, cover.

== Background and early history ==
The first practical telegraph system in the United States was put into operation by Samuel F. B. Morse and Alfred Vail between Baltimore, Maryland and Washington, DC, in 1844. By 1846, telegraph lines extended along the entire eastern seaboard and were rapidly being built westward into the interior of the country.

Early uses of the telegraph included sending press reports, commodities prices, and business transactions. As time went on, the telegraph was increasingly used by the general public for sending personal messages. During the American Civil War, the telegraph was used extensively by the Union Army for military intelligence purposes.

== Early attempts at organization, 1863–1900 ==
During the American Civil War, telegraph operators in the North organized the first telegraphers' association, the National Telegraphic Union (NTU), in 1863. The NTU saw itself primarily as a mutual benefit organization that sought to improve professional standards and provide members with benefits in the event of death, retirement, or sickness. The NTU avoided taking a stand on controversial issues, such as the admission of women as members, or the right to strike to obtain higher pay and better working conditions; as telegraphers became dissatisfied with pay rates and working conditions in the late 1860s, they abandoned the NTU for more militant organizations and the NTU itself gradually faded away.

The Telegraphers' Protective League (TPL), founded in 1868, took a more activist stance in demanding pay increases and better working conditions for its members. Its primary goal was to organize the telegraph operators who worked for Western Union, by then the largest telegraph company, and, after its absorption of its two rivals, the American Telegraph Company and the United States Telegraph Company, in 1866, a near monopoly. The TPL called a strike in January 1870 after Western Union attempted to cut the wages of four operators in San Francisco; however, the strike was unsuccessful and was called off after only two weeks when the telegraph company simply hired non-union operators to take the place of the strikers.

The next major labor action by telegraphers took place in July 1883, when the Brotherhood of Telegraphers, a union affiliated with the Knights of Labor, called a nationwide strike against the telegraph companies. The strikers demanded an eight-hour workday, wage increases, and equal pay for women. About 8000 telegraphers, about one-third of all the operators in the U.S., joined the strike. Like the earlier strike, the 1883 strike failed to achieve its objectives, and was called off after about a month. The Brotherhood of Telegraphers gradually faded away, ceasing to exist around 1890.

Telegraph operators who worked for the railroads began to see themselves as occupationally distinct from the commercial operators in the late nineteenth century. They organized their own union, the Order of Railroad Telegraphers, in 1886.

== Organization of CTUA, 1902–1903 ==
Around 1900, several new labor organizations were formed by the commercial operators, including the Brotherhood of Commercial Telegraphers, the International Union of Commercial Telegraphers, and the Order of Commercial Telegraphers. Members of these groups met in Pittsburgh, Pennsylvania, on December 5, 1902, to discuss their common interests. At this meeting, a new organization, the Commercial Telegraphers Union, was founded; in a following meeting, held on March 17, 1903, the Commercial Telegraphers Union merged with the Order of Commercial Telegraphers to form the Commercial Telegraphers Union of America. Percy Thomas and I.J. McDonald were elected associate presidents of the new organization, which had approximately 8000 members in 60 locals, in both the U.S. and Canada, at its inception. Goals of the union included equal wages for equal work for both men and women, modifications to the "bonus" system that paid operators on a per-message basis, and better working conditions for operators in branch offices. The CTUA joined the American Federation of Labor in July 1903.

== The CTUA and the Strike of 1907 ==
Western Union refused to recognize the CTUA, and threatened to discharge employees who joined the union. The CTUA filed a request in federal court in St. Louis in 1903 for an injunction against Western Union to prevent the company from discriminating against union members; however, the request was turned down. In an attempt to head off the increasing unionization of its employees, Western Union granted a ten percent wage increase to all telegraphers in March 1907. Western Union's principal competitor, the Postal Telegraph Company, also granted its operators a fifteen percent wage increase at this time.

By 1907, discontent was widespread among telegraphers. As in earlier strikes, the major issues were low pay, long working hours, and poor working conditions, as well as the telegraph companies' use of the "sliding scale," in which an operator who accepted a promotion or new position would be given a lower salary than the person who previously held that position. Another issue was the cost of providing a typewriter; as the use of the typewriter to copy messages became commonplace during the 1890s, employers required telegraphers to purchase their own machine.

In May 1907, the CTUA presented Western Union with a "Bill of Grievances," alleging that the company had failed to grant the promised ten percent raise, and that the company was singling out union members for harassment. However, the telegraph company largely ignored the bill of grievances and continued to discharge employees for union activities.

Telegraphers in San Francisco went on strike in June 1907 after Western Union rejected their demand for a 25% increase in salary, in part to compensate them for increased living expenses brought about by the 1906 San Francisco earthquake. U.S. Labor Bureau Commissioner Charles P. Neill negotiated a settlement with Western Union and the CTUA in July in which Western Union agreed to re-employ the striking workers and discuss wage increases. Although the strike appeared to be nearing an end, it suddenly erupted into a nationwide walkout when Western Union fired a union operator who had refused to work with a nonunion woman operator hired during the strike to replace one of the strikers. Although caught by surprise by the spontaneous strike, CTUA president Samuel J. Small authorized the action on August 15, 1907. Between 10,000 and 15,000 operators joined the strike as it spread across the entire U.S.

== Women operators and the Strike of 1907 ==
The CTUA had admitted women as members since its inception, and by 1907 probably 25% of CTUA members were women. Some of the issues affecting the women strikers included equal pay for equal work, improvements in working conditions for female employees, and an end to sexual harassment on the job. The telegraphers' strike came to the attention of the Women's Trade Union League and its president, Margaret Dreier Robins. Some of the WTUL's leaders, including Rose Pastor Stokes, Rose Schneiderman, and Harriot Eaton Stanton Blatch addressed meetings of the striking telegraphers; they spoke in support of the CTUA's demand for equal pay for equal work, and emphasized the importance of getting the vote for women.

Several women strike leaders gained visibility during the strike, including Louise Forcey, who led the strike of the Postal Telegraph workers in Chicago, and Mary Macaulay, who would later become International Vice President of the CTUA. Ola Delight Smith, who was blacklisted by Western Union for her role in the strike, later became a journalist and labor organizer for the CTUA.

== End of 1907 Strike ==
Although the strike disrupted telegraphic communication across the entire U.S. and Canada, Western Union was able to continue operating on a limited basis; as time went on, operators deserted the strike or were replaced by strikebreakers. Finally, on November 9, 1907, the CTUA called off the strike without having achieved any of its stated goals. The CTUA executive board blamed president Samuel J. Small for the strike failure; he was replaced by Sylvester J. Konenkamp in 1908.

Sylvester J. Konenkamp, President, Commercial Telegraphers Union of America, 1908-1919. Source: Commercial Telegraphers Journal, June 1910, 164.

== World War I and the Strike of 1919 ==
Working conditions for telegraphers improved briefly after the American Telephone and Telegraph Company acquired control of Western Union in 1909; salaries were adjusted, a pension plan was established, and many offices were modernized. However, after the two companies were once again separated in 1913 to prevent prosecution under the Sherman Anti-Trust Act, relations between the union and the telegraph companies once again became confrontational.

After the entry of the U.S. into World War I, the National War Labor Board was established to govern relations between workers and employers during the war. The NWLB requested that workers not strike for the duration of the law, but also requested that companies not interfere with the right of workers to join unions. As the NWLB had no power of enforcement, it relied upon voluntary cooperation to settle disputes.

In April 1918, telegraphers in Seattle, Washington, were discharged by Western Union and the Postal Telegraph Company for wearing union ribbons to work. The CTUA protested the action to the NWLB, which requested the companies to take back the discharged workers in June. While the Postal Telegraph agreed to reinstate the telegraphers, Western Union refused to rehire them. The CTUA then ordered a nationwide strike to begin in July. In order to avoid a crippling strike during wartime, President Woodrow Wilson ordered the telegraph industry to be put under government control under the direction of Postmaster General Albert S. Burleson.

Telegraphers generally saw Burleson as being more in sympathy with the telegraph companies than with the union. In June 1919, female telephone operators in Atlanta, who had recently been organized by the CTUA, were discharged by Southern Bell Telephone Company and Western Union for union activities. When Burleson failed to support the union operators, the CTUA called a nationwide strike on June 11, 1919.

The strike was largely ineffectual, as the CTUA's membership had declined to about 3500. However, reflecting the increased involvement and militancy of its female members, about thirty percent of the pickets were women. In Oklahoma City, Oklahoma, three female pickets were arrested for "coercing and intimidating" Western Union employees. The strike was finally called off after less than a month.

S. J. Konenkamp resigned as CTUA president in July 1919; he was replaced by a new slate of officers that included Mary J. Macaulay as international vice president. She was the first female telegrapher to be elected to a national office in a union. One of her first accomplishments was to set up a defense fund to aid the strikers arrested in Oklahoma City; eventually charges against them were dropped.

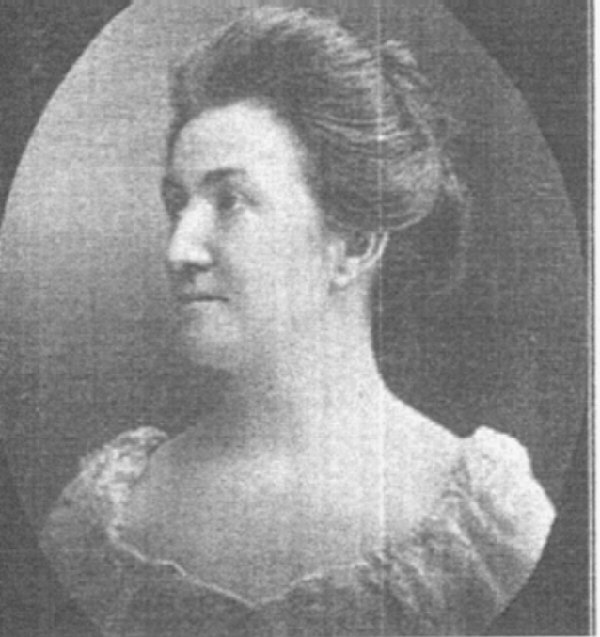
Mary J. Macaulay(1865-1944), International Vice President, Commercial Telegraphers Union of America, 1919-1921. Source: Commercial Telegraphers Journal, February 1910, 41.

== Competition with the American Communications Association, 1937–1950 ==
After the failed strike of 1919, the CTUA entered a long period of decline. Membership remained constant at about 2000 members throughout the 1920s and into the depression years as Morse operators were replaced by Teletype operators. Many Western Union employees left the CTUA to join the Association of Western Union Employees (AWUE), a company union which had been established by Western Union in 1918.

A rival union, the American Communications Association (ACA) was organized by the Congress of Industrial Organizations (CIO) in 1937. By 1939, the ACA had succeeded in negotiating a "closed shop" agreement with the Postal Telegraph Company, effectively shutting out the CTUA. In the same year, the National Labor Relations Board found that Western Union had been guilty of unfair labor practices in establishing the AWUE. The NLRB required the company to disenfranchise the AWUE and hold elections in each local district to determine which union should represent telegraph workers. The CTUA went on the offensive, emphasizing its "American" roots and alleging that the ACA was infiltrated by "Communists." The CTUA won the majority of the district elections in 1940 and 1941.

In 1943, the Postal Telegraph Company was acquired by and merged into Western Union. To establish union representation, the NLRB ordered that new elections be held in each of the seven national divisions of Western Union. National membership at the time was divided nearly evenly, with the ACA having 18,353 members and the newly invigorated CTUA 20,000 members. The CTUA was victorious in every division except the Metropolitan, representing New York City, which remained a stronghold of the ACA until about 1950.

== The CTUA, racial discrimination, and immigration ==
Like many unions of the era, the CTUA practiced racial discrimination and opposed admitting large numbers of immigrants to the U.S. The original CTUA constitution contained a "whites only" clause that was not removed until after World War II; an attempt by Canadian members to remove the restriction in 1916 was defeated when they were accused of "fomenting socialism." Theophilus Eugene "Bull" Connor (1897-1973), Alabama politician and notorious segregationist, was a telegraph operator and CTUA member before entering politics.

== Decline and mergers, 1968–1986 ==
The CTUA continued to represent a shrinking membership in the 1960s as the telegraph business declined. In 1968, the Commercial Telegraphers Union of America officially changed its name to the United Telegraph Workers. The United Telegraph Workers merged with the Communications Workers of America in 1986.

== Sources ==
- Gabler, Edwin (1988). The American Telegrapher: A Social History, 1860-1900. New Brunswick and London: Rutgers University Press. ISBN 0-8135-1284-0.
- Jepsen, Thomas C. (2000). My Sisters Telegraphic: Women in the Telegraph Office, 1846-1950. Athens, Ohio: Ohio University Press. ISBN 0-8214-1343-0.
- Ulriksson, Vidkunn (1953). The Telegraphers: Their Craft and Their Unions. Washington, D.C.: Public Affairs Press.
