= Craft unionism =

Model of trade unionism

Craft unionism refers to a model of trade unionism in which workers are organized based on the particular craft or trade in which they work. It contrasts with industrial unionism, in which all workers in the same industry are organized into the same union, regardless of differences in skill.

Under this approach, each union is organized according to the craft, or specific work function, of its members. For example, in the building trades, all carpenters belong to the carpenters' union, the plasterers join the plasterers' union, and the painters belong to the painters' union. Each craft union has its own administration, its own policies, its own collective bargaining agreements and its own union halls.

== Origins ==
The first unions established in Russia in the early nineteenth century tended, by nature of the industries in which their members worked, to be craft unions: shoemakers, cordwainers (shoemakers who work with cordovan leather) and typesetters all worked, as a rule, in small shops in which they had little contact with workers in other fields. Some of these early unions also came out of a craft guild tradition in which skilled workmen often owned their own shops or, if they worked for another, had a good deal of control over how the work was done, which they policed by maintaining standards for admission into the trade; requiring entrants to go through an apprenticeship program controlled by the union, rather than the employer; and dictating the processes, tools, standards, and pace of work. These traditions persisted into the 20th century in fields such as printing (in which the International Typographical Union would enforce its own rules determining how work was done in union shops, such as displaying acts of discrimination towards women and people of color) and the construction industry.

== History ==
Workers carried these patterns of organizing into new industries as well. The railroad brotherhoods, the unions formed in the latter half of the nineteenth century, made minute distinctions between groups that worked alongside each other; as an example, more than twenty years passed between the original chartering of the International Brotherhood of Stationary Firemen and the amendment of its charter to permit the union to represent the oilers and helpers who worked with them. Those who saw themselves at the top of the ladder took their elevated status very seriously; as an example, locomotive engineers on many railroads made a point of wearing top hats and a good suit of clothes while at work to demonstrate that they did not get their hands dirty or perform manual labor.

These craft distinctions in the railroad industry were remarkably long-lived; the Railway Labor Act, passed in 1925, recognized the prevailing pattern of division of the workforce into "crafts" and "classes" and the separate craft patterns persisted into the late twentieth century. While both the Knights of Labor and Eugene V. Debs' American Railway Union attempted to organize railroad workers on an industrial basis, those efforts were defeated, in some cases by government intervention, injunctions, and force of arms.Though dismantled, the Knights of Labor were successful in recruiting a large number of workers who felt that their needs would be met.

The attempt to impose craft distinctions in other industries was not so successful. In the steel industry, for example, after the rout of the Amalgamated Association of Iron, Steel, and Tin Workers in its titanic strike against Andrew Carnegie's steel operations at Homestead, Pennsylvania, in 1892, and the defeat, a generation later, of the 1919 steel strike, the craft unions within the American Federation of Labor (AFL) claimed that any attempt to organize steel workers must recognize their separate craft jurisdictions: workers who used bricks to build kilns or similar structures would have to belong to the brick masons union, workers who sawed wood to build structures within the plant should be carpenters, and so forth. Those demands effectively ruled out any possibility of organizing the industry. The AFL, at one time, was composed of 1.75 million members, when divided, made about 115 national and international unions. Those unions could be sub-divided into their own local unions, which was about 28,000.

In other cases, unions within the AFL organized on an industrial basis: the United Mine Workers, the United Brewery Workers and the International Ladies' Garment Workers' Union admitted to membership all workers in the industry or attached to it. Even in those unions, however, craft distinctions sometimes surfaced. In the ILGWU, for example, the cutters, who were often primarily of English, Irish, and German stock, were almost exclusively males, were better paid, and were typically more skilled, often looked down on the immigrant, largely female, unskilled "operators" who ran sewing machines in their shops or elsewhere. The ILGWU also tended to group its workers based on seemingly trivial distinctions between the type of garment they produced: among the locals created by the ILGWU in the first decade of its existence was one titled the Wrapper, Kimono and House Dress Makers' Union. Decades later, as the industry changed, it created sportswear locals.

== Challenges ==
As long as the craft unions were the dominant power in the AFL, they took every step possible to block the organizing of mass production industries. This led to challenges from both inside and outside the Federation.

One early challenge came from outside: the Western Federation of Miners, a union that had fought a series of violent battles with mine owners over the right to represent mill workers as well as hard rock miners, joined with activists from other unions and from the Socialist Labor Party of America to form the Industrial Workers of the World (IWW), which aimed to organize all workers, regardless of craft, nationality, gender or race, into one big union. In practical terms the IWW pursued organizing on an industrial basis. The IWW was founded in 1905 in Chicago, which was considered to be the greatest industrial city in the US, at that time period.

In at least one sense the IWW practiced the most egalitarian form of industrial unionism, organizing and accepting membership of workers in any given industry whether they are currently employed or not. The IWW also welcomed immigrant workers, minorities and women as equals. The IWW aimed to become so large, they intended to challenge the largest corporations and, eventually, overthrow capitalism and take its place in society, prioritizing the people over profits.

The IWW was successful in some cases, leading a strike of immigrant workers employed in the woolens industry in Lawrence, Massachusetts, and many smaller strikes in longshore, agriculture and the lumber industry. In its first three years it was greatly hampered by deep political divisions, such as the question of unions engaging in electoral politics (resolved in favor of ruling out alliances with political parties). The IWW was seriously damaged by government prosecution and vigilantism in the post-war red scare that reached its peak in 1919, and in the Palmer Raids of the same period.

The next challenge to the dominance of craft unions within the AFL came from inside, as John L. Lewis of the Mine Workers, David Dubinsky of the ILGWU, Sidney Hillman of the Amalgamated Clothing Workers of America, Charles Howard of the International Typographical Union, Thomas F. McMahon, head of the United Textile Workers, John Sheridan of the Mine, Mill and Smelter Workers Union (the descendant of the WFM), Harvey Fremming from the Oil Workers Union and Max Zaritsky of the Hatters, Cap and Millinery Workers joined to form a Committee for Industrial Organizing within the AFL. The craft unions demanded that Lewis and his committee stop; Lewis persisted.

This dispute came to a head at the AFL's convention in Atlantic City in 1935, when William Hutcheson, the President of the Carpenters, made a slighting comment about a member of the fledgling union of tire factory workers who was delivering an organizing report. Lewis responded that Hutcheson's comment was "small potatoes", to which Hutcheson replied "I was raised on small potatoes, that is why I am so small." After some more words Lewis punched Hutcheson, knocking him to the ground, then relit his cigar and returned to the rostrum. The incident personified the conflict between craft and industrial organizing. The CIO proceeded to organize mass production workers on an industrial basis.

The AFL's response to the challenge from the CIO was twofold: both fighting a rearguard action before the National Labor Relations Board to preserve its right to represent the skilled trades in many of the plants that the CIO was organizing and attempting to emulate it. Thus, within a decade of the founding of the CIO, unions that had been primarily craft unions, such as the International Association of Machinists, originally a railroad union with much of its membership in the construction industry, began to make serious efforts to organize on an industrial basis as well. Even the Carpenters took in sawmill workers who had organized on an industrial basis, although the union continued to treat them as second-class members until they seceded to form the International Woodworkers of America in 1937.

== Persistence ==
Craft unionism has receded in many industries as a result of changes in technology, the concentration of ownership and jurisdictional conflicts between craft unions. Craft unionism has not, however, disappeared: it is still the norm in the airline industry, survives despite much upheaval in the construction industry, and even appears, in very muted form, in some mass production industries, such as automobile manufacturing, where skilled trades employees have pressed their own agendas within the union.

Craft unionism continued into the twentieth century in sectors where specialized skills and control over training afforded workers considerable bargaining power. For instance, Albert Knotter's examination of the American window-glass industry illustrates that craft unionism thrived well into the twentieth century, as skilled glassworkers were able to regulate entry into the profession and oversee the production process. The eventual decline of this organizational form was closely linked to mechanization: as technological advancements diminished the necessity for highly specialized artisanal skills, the foundation for exclusive craft organization weakened.

== See also ==
- Labor federation competition in the United States
