= Michael J. Colleran =

American labor union leader

Michael J. Colleran (1884 – November 18, 1940) was an American labor union leader.

Born in New York City, Colleran became a plasterer and joined the Operative Plasterers' and Cement Finishers' International Association. He was elected as president of his local union, and then as vice-president of the international union. In 1923, he was elected as president of the new Manhattan Building Trades Council. That year, he was indicted for conspiracy to hamper building operations, alongside 35 other members of his local. The indictments were dismissed by Jeremiah T. Mahoney of the New York Supreme Court, after a grand jury disagreed with the verdict, and Colleran agreed to end the practices.

In 1929, Colleran won election as president of the union. He represented the American Federation of Labor (AFL) at the British Trades Union Congress in 1934. In 1940, he stopped in Chicago on his way to the AFL convention in New Orleans, when he became ill. He died in the city, two weeks later.

Trade union offices
Preceded by Edward J. McGivern	President of the Operative Plasterers' and Cement Finishers' International Association; 1929–1940	Succeeded by John E. Rooney
Preceded by Thomas E. Burke; Christian Madsen	American Federation of Labor delegate to the Trades Union Congress; 1934; With: Edward Flore	Succeeded by Dennis Lane; Henry F. Schmal
