= William J. Spencer =

American labor leader

- Born: 1867; Hamilton, Ontario, Canada
- Died: 1933 (aged 65–66)
- Occupation: Labour leader

William J. Spencer (1867–1933) was an American labor leader who was secretary-treasurer of the Building Trades Department of the American Federation of Labor from its founding nearly continuously until his death in 1933.

Spencer was born in Hamilton, Ontario, in 1867. He became a plumber and emigrated to Buffalo, New York, in 1894, where he joined Local 36 of the Journeymen Plumbers.

Spencer was elected secretary-treasurer of the international Plumbers' union in 1897. In 1900, he was appointed "general organizer" of the union.

In 1903, Spencer was elected secretary-treasurer of the Structural Building Trades Alliance (SBTA). He served until 1908, when the SBTA affiliated with the American Federation of Labor (AFL) and became the Building Trades Department (BTD). He was elected secretary-treasurer of the BTD, and served until 1924. He was elected to the same office again in 1927, and served until his death in 1933.

In 1904, Spencer was elected eighth vice-president of the AFL. He served one year.

Spencer lived in Dayton, Ohio, from 1903 to 1912, after which he lived in Washington, D.C.

Trade union offices
Preceded by New position	Eighth Vice-President of the American Federation of Labor; 1903–1905	Succeeded by Joseph F. Valentine
Preceded by Department founded	Secretary-Treasurer of the Building Trades Department; 1908–1924	Succeeded by William J. Tracy
Preceded by Sara Conboy; Timothy Healy	American Federation of Labor delegate to the Trades Union Congress; 1921; With: James J. Forrester	Succeeded by Edward J. McGivern; Benjamin Schlesinger
Preceded by William J. Tracy	Secretary-Treasurer of the Building Trades Department; 1927–1933	Succeeded by Herbert Rivers
