= James J. Forrester =

American labor union leader

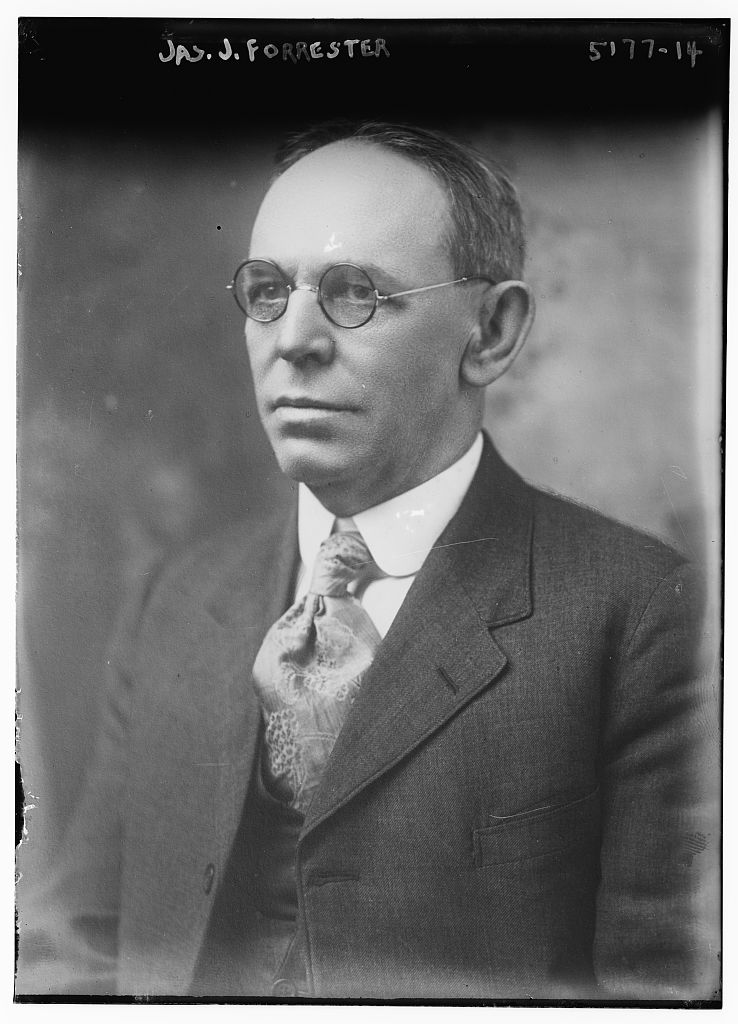
James J. Forrester

James Joseph Forrester (October 28, 1867 – May 1, 1939) was an American labor union leader.

Born in Wauseon, Ohio, Forrester was educated at Fayette Normal School, and then Ohio Normal University. He qualified as a lawyer, but instead found work as a letter carrier, then became a railroad clerk. He rose to become yardmaster of the Lake Shore and Michigan Southern Railway.

Forrester joined the Brotherhood of Railway Clerks, and in 1907, he began working full-time for the union as an organizer. In 1908, he was elected as deputy grand president, then as vice-grand president in 1910, and grand president in 1912.

In 1919, Forrester was a member of Woodrow Wilson's industrial conference. The following year, he stood down as union president to join the new Railroad Labor Board. In 1921, he served as the American Federation of Labor's delegate to the British Trades Union Congress, also attending the Irish Trades Union Congress. In 1922, he became national legislative council of the Railway Clerks.

In 1925, Forrester left the Railway Clerks, to become president of a rival union, the American Federation of Express Workers, serving for three years. In 1929, he was appointed as the statistician to the inquiry into the 1926 United States Senate election in Pennsylvania. He was a special investigator for the Immigration Bureau of the Department of Labor from 1931 to 1933, and then worked as a statistical and labor research consultant.

Trade union offices
Preceded by John J. Carrigan	President of the Brotherhood of Railway Clerks; 1915–1920	Succeeded by Edward L. Fitzgerald
Preceded by Sara Conboy; Timothy Healy	American Federation of Labor delegate to the Trades Union Congress; 1921; With: William J. Spencer	Succeeded by Edward J. McGivern; Benjamin Schlesinger
