= Sara Conboy =

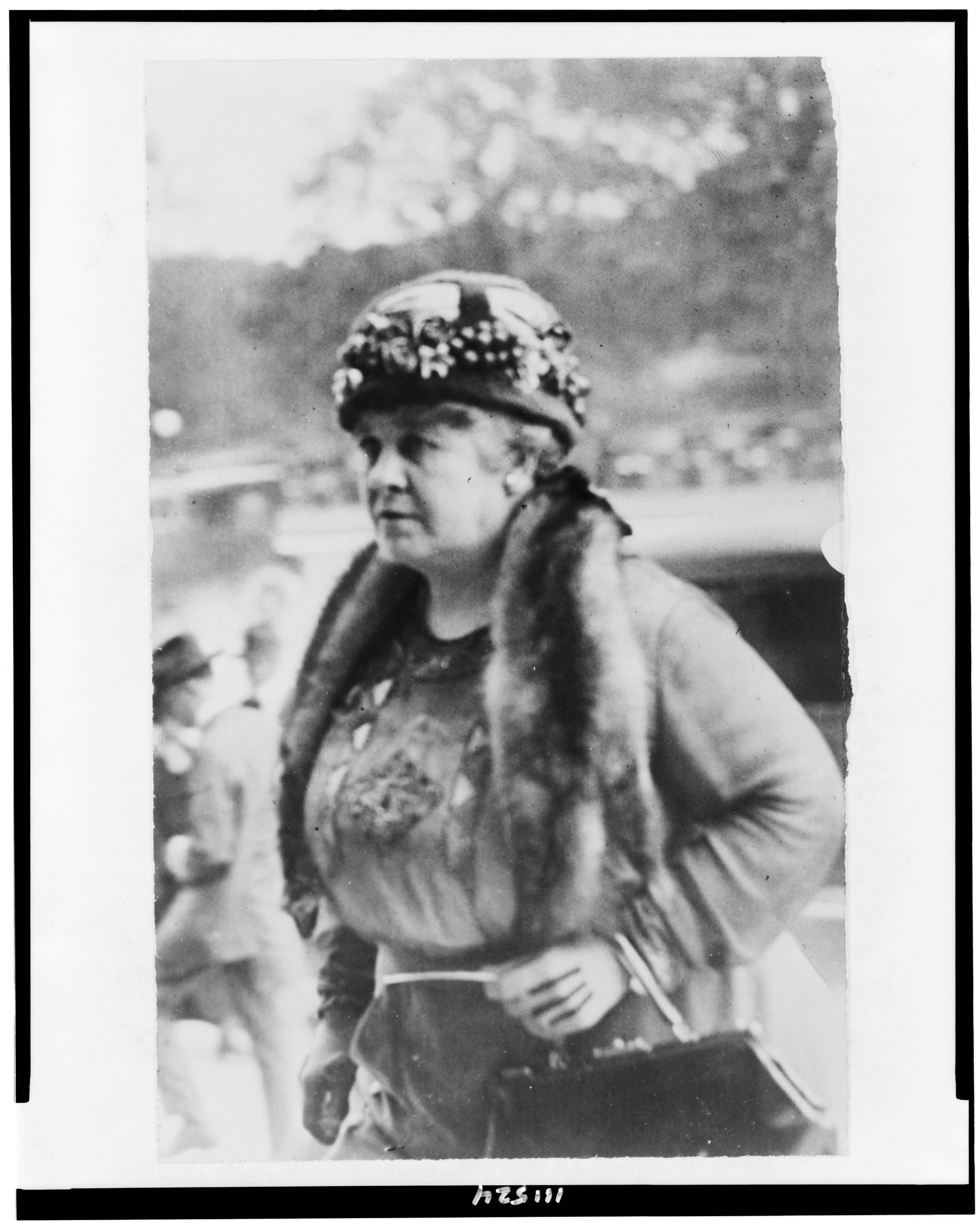
Conboy in 1910.

Sara Agnes Mclaughlin Conboy (April 3, 1870 – January 7, 1928) was an American labor organizer.

She was born Sara Agnes Mclaughlin in Boston, Massachusetts. At the age of 11 she began working in a candy factory, then spent time in a button factory before becoming a skilled weaver. During this period she was married to a mailman named Joseph P. Conboy, but he died two years afterward. While working at a carpet factory in Roxbury, she led a strike that lasted from 1909–10.

Rising to prominence in the labor movement, Sara helped organize the United Textile Workers of America, eventually becoming their secretary-treasurer in 1915. During World War I she was appointed to the Council of National Defense. In 1920 she was the first woman to serve as a United States delegate to the British Trades Union Congress. She was also the first woman to direct a bank in the state of New York, and she served on several government committees.

Trade union offices
Preceded by William Hutcheson; J. J. Hynes	American Federation of Labor delegate to the Trades Union Congress; 1920; With: Timothy Healy	Succeeded by William J. Spencer; James J. Forrester
