= Edward J. McGivern =

American labor union leader

Edward J. McGivern (November 29, 1871 – April 6, 1929) was an American labor union leader.

Born in Boston, McGivern attended grammar school. In 1889, he became a plasterer, and he soon joined the Operative Plasterers' and Cement Masons' International Association. In 1908, he was elected as a business agent of his local union. He soon won election as vice-president of the union, then in 1912 became the union's president.

McGivern suffered from rheumatism for many years. In 1929, he attended the conference of the Workers' Education Bureau of America, during which he died suddenly.

Trade union offices
Preceded by John H. Donlin	President of the Operative Plasterers' and Cement Masons' International Association; 1912–1929	Succeeded by Michael J. Colleran
Preceded by James J. Forrester; William J. Spencer	American Federation of Labor delegate to the Trades Union Congress; 1922; With: Benjamin Schlesinger	Succeeded by Anthony Chlopek; Peter S. Shaughnessy
