= Operative Plasterers' and Cement Masons' International Association =

Trade union in the US and Canada

OPCMIA
- Operative Plasterers' and Cement Masons' International Association of the United States and Canada
- Founded: July 21, 1864; 162 years ago
- Headquarters: 9700 Patuxent Woods Drive, Suite 200; Columbia, Maryland 21046
- Location(s): United States and Canada
- Members: 43,739 (2018)
- Key people: Daniel Stepano (general president)
- Affiliations: AFL–CIO, Canadian Labour Congress
- Website: www.opcmia.org

The Operative Plasterers' and Cement Masons' International Association of the United States and Canada (OPCMIA) is a trade union of plasterers and cement masons in the construction industry in the United States and Canada. Members of the union finish interior walls and ceilings of buildings and apply plaster on masonry, metal, and wire lath or gypsum. Members of the union apply fireproofing to structural steel. Cement masons are responsible for all concrete construction, including pouring and finishing of slabs, steps, wall tops, curbs and gutters, sidewalks, and paving. The organization is a member union of the AFL–CIO and Canadian Labour Congress.

== History ==
The union traces its roots to the American Civil War era, when the National Plasterer's Union sought to unify local craft unions representing workers in the trade.

The modern organization was formed in 1882, when a number of locals who had supported the Cincinnati, Ohio local in a strike earlier that year met in St. Louis, Missouri, to reestablish a national organization.

In 1946 the union established a program, in conjunction with the Contracting Plasterers' International Association and the Associated General Contractors, to establish national apprentice training standards. It trained many World War II veterans in its apprenticeship programs while reducing competition from non-union contractors.

In 1960 the union moved its headquarters from Cleveland to the Washington, D.C. area and is now based in Columbia, Maryland.

== Presidents ==
- 1882: Michael Mulvihill
- 1883: James W. Smith
- ?
- 1908: John H. Donlin
- 1912: Edward J. McGivern
- 1927: Michael J. Colleran
- 1940: John E. Rooney
- 1959: Edward J. Leonard
- 1970: Joseph P. Power
- 1981: Melvin H. Roots
- Robert J. Holton
- 1996: John J. Dougherty
- 2007: Patrick Finley
- 2016: Daniel Stepano

== See also ==
- Concrete finisher
