= Joe William Trotter Jr. =

American professor of African-American history

- Born: 18 June 1945
- Occupation: Professor of History

Joe William Trotter Jr. (born 18 June 1945) is a Giant Eagle Professor of History and Social Justice and past History Department Chair at Carnegie Mellon University. He is an expert in African-American history.

== Education and career ==
Trotter received his BA degree from Carthage College in Kenosha, Wisconsin and his M.A. and Ph.D. degrees from the University of Minnesota. He presides over numerous committees, including the Executive Councils of the Organization of American Historians and the Society for Historical Archaeology, the Program Committee of the Oral History Association, the Jameson Fellowship and Program Committees of the American Historical Association, as well as Nominating and Program Committees of OAH and Francis B. Simkins Prize and Program Committee of SHA. Trotter also was a member and vice president of the Board of Trustees of the H. John Heinz III Regional History Center, a Smithsonian Affiliate, and past President of the Labor and Working-Class History Association.

Trotter also affiliated with the Ohio School Boards Association and is a frequent contributor to Jacobin Magazine.

In 2019, Trotter was elected a fellow of the American Academy of Arts and Sciences.

== Writings ==
- Coal, class, and color : Blacks in southern West Virginia, 1915-32 (1977)
- Black Milwaukee : the making of an industrial proletariat, 1915-45 (1984)
- The Great migration in historical perspective : new dimensions of race, class, and gender (1991)
- From a raw deal to a New Deal? : African Americans, 1929-1945 (1995)
- African Americans in the industrial age : a documentary history, 1915-1945 (1996)
- River Jordan : African American Urban Life in the Ohio Valley (1998)
- The African American Experience (2000)
- African American urban experience : perspectives from the colonial period to the present (2004)
- African American urban history since World War II (2009)
- Race and renaissance : African Americans in Pittsburgh since World War II (2010)
- Workers on arrival : Black labor in the making of America (2019)
