= Order of Railroad Telegraphers =

Former trade union of the United States

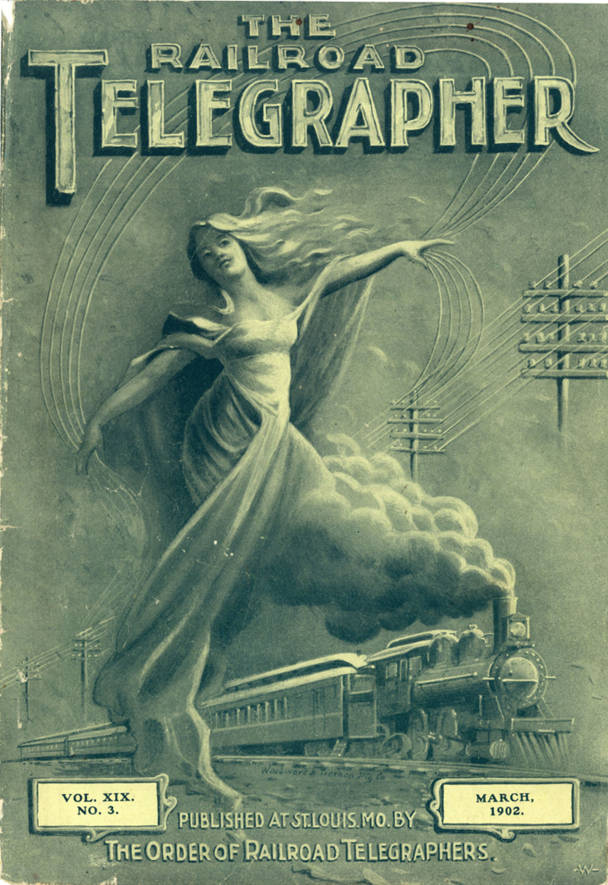
Cover of The Railroad Telegrapher, monthly magazine of the Order of Railroad Telegraphers, for March 1902.

The Order of Railroad Telegraphers (ORT) was a United States labor union established in the late nineteenth century to promote the interests of telegraph operators working for the railroads.

== Organizational history ==
=== Background and early years ===
While early telegraph lines often ran alongside railroad tracks in the United States, it was not until 1851 that the telegraph was first used for train routing by Charles Minot, Superintendent of the Erie Railroad. As the practice gained wider acceptance in the 1860s and 1870s, telegraphers would be stationed in individual depots along the railroad line in order to receive train orders from a centrally located dispatcher and report back on train movements; telegraphed train orders would be written out on paper and "handed up" to the crews of passing trains.

This practice greatly increased the efficiency of single-track railroads by enabling two trains traveling in opposite directions to use the track at the same time. The dispatcher would designate one of the trains as the "superior" train and give it right of way over the "inferior" train, which would be required to pull into a siding until the superior train had passed. Local depot telegraph operators would keep track of train arrival times at each station (referred to as "OSing" the train) and pass the information on to other operators and the dispatcher. The local depot operator would also set the track switches to enable the inferior train to pull into the siding upon the approach of the superior train.

The ability of the local depot operators to keep track of the actual time of train movements was particularly important in the era before the establishment of time zones, when local "sun time" might be different at each station; a miscalculation of the "meet time" of two trains running on a single track could result in disaster. Thus railroad telegraphers played a role in the operation of the railroads that was not unlike the role of air traffic controllers in the modern airline industry; they enabled the trains to run safely and on time.

In the 1860s, U.S. telegraphers began to form labor organizations, including the National Telegraphic Union and the Telegraphers' Protective League, in order to promote professionalism, negotiate for higher wages, and demand better working conditions. However, following an unsuccessful strike by the Brotherhood of Telegraphers, an affiliate of the Knights of Labor, in 1883, the railroad operators began to see themselves as occupationally distinct from the commercial telegraph operators, who worked in telegraph offices and primarily handled commodities reports, news reports, and personal messages.

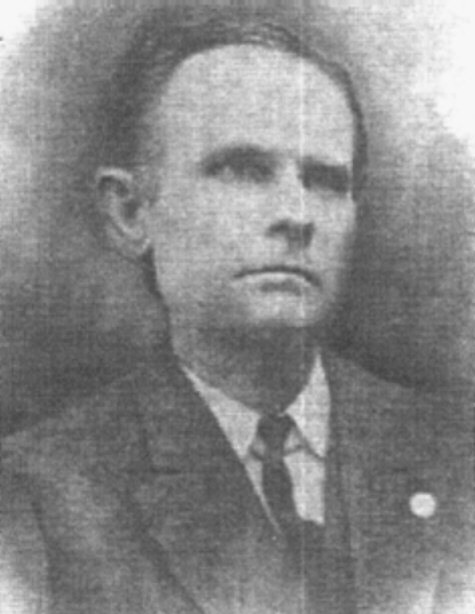
Ambrose D. Thurston, Founder, Order of Railroad Telegraphers. Source: Railroad Telegrapher, May 1913, 706.

A meeting of telegraphers representing the major U.S. railroads met in Cedar Rapids, Iowa, on June 9, 1886. Organized by Ambrose D. Thurston (1852–1913), publisher of the trade journal Railroad Telegrapher, in Vinton, Iowa, the group formed the Order of Railway Telegraphers of North America, with membership limited to telegraphers who were or who had been employed in railroad service. The Order of Railway Telegraphers was initially intended to be more of a fraternal organization than a trade union; it was ideologically closer to the conservative railroad unions than the more militant commercial telegraphers. Initially, its constitution forbade members to strike except in extreme conditions. By March 1887, the union had attracted 2250 members, the number of members grew to 9000 by March 1889.

=== Increased militancy in the 1890s ===
In the early 1890s, members began to demand that the union take a more assertive role in negotiating wages and working conditions with the railroads. In 1891, the constitution was changed to explicitly make the ORT a "protective" organization, with the right to call strikes if negotiations with the railroads were unsuccessful; at the same time, the name was changed from "Order of Railway Telegraphers" to "Order of Railroad Telegraphers."

One unintended consequence of this was a relatively disorganized period in which operators would stage "wildcat" strikes without consulting ORT leadership, who would then be forced into the position of sanctioning strikes that were already in progress. During the relatively prosperous years of 1890–92, the railroads were inclined to recognize the union and negotiate agreements with the ORT to guarantee wages and working hours. As a result, agreements were signed during this period with the Atlantic & Pacific Railroad, the Denver & Rio Grande, the Union Pacific, the Missouri Pacific Railroad, the Baltimore and Ohio Railroad, and the Chesapeake and Ohio Railway.

A.D. Thurston, who had served as Grand Chief of the ORT since its founding, was replaced by D.G. Ramsay in 1892, who promised to take a more aggressive stance in dealing with the railroads.

=== The Panic of 1893 ===
The Panic of 1893 had a severe impact on the railroad industry; major lines that had overexpanded during the prosperous years, including the Reading Railroad, the Union Pacific, the Atchison, Topeka and Santa Fe, and the Northern Pacific all went into receivership. The economic hard times led to more confrontations between the ORT and the railroads. A strike was declared against the Lehigh Valley Railroad on November 18, 1893, after the railroad refused to bargain with a joint commission composed of the ORT and the "Big Four" railroad unions, the Brotherhood of Locomotive Engineers, the Order of Railway Conductors, the Brotherhood of Locomotive Firemen, and the Brotherhood of Railroad Brakemen.

The state Boards of Mediation and Arbitration of New York and New Jersey intervened and settled the dispute through mediation, a tactic that would be increasingly used by the ORT in later years. The strike was ended on December 6, 1893, and was considered to be a significant victory for the ORT when the railroad agreed to reemploy all those who had gone out on strike.

The Panic of 1893 also had a negative effect on ORT membership, dropping from 18,000 in 1893 to only 5000 in 1895. When the ORT leadership refused to sanction a sympathy strike with the workers involved in the Pullman Strike of 1894, many members left the ORT to join the American Railway Union, formed by Eugene V. Debs in June 1893. Walker V. Powell was elected Grand Chief in 1894.

=== Stability and growth, 1895-1900 ===
The ORT organized its membership into a set of system divisions in the late 1890s, which improved communications and coordination of activities. A Mutual Benefit Department was added in 1898 to provide assistance for members who were ill or unemployed. The increased use of block signaling led to the admission of switch levermen as members in 1897. The ORT took on an international focus in 1896 through its support of a strike against the Canadian Pacific Railway, called on September 28, 1896, to protest the CPR's dismissal of union employees and the railroad's refusal to negotiate with the union on wages and work rules.

The strike ended after nine days, with the railroad recognizing the right of the ORT to represent the railroad telegraphers in collective bargaining. This victory gave the ORT a foothold in Canada, and recognition as an international union. At about the same time, the ORT began to organize railroad telegraphers in Mexico. One result of this international focus was the appearance of district reports in the Railroad Telegrapher in French for the French Canadian operators, and Spanish for the Mexican operators.

Headquarters of the ORT were relocated from Vinton, Iowa, to Peoria, Illinois, in September 1895. In 1899, the ORT relocated again to St. Louis, Missouri, and became a member of the American Federation of Labor. By 1901, the ORT comprised 30 system divisions with 10,000 members, double the number of members in 1895. Henry B. Perham replaced W. V. Powell as Grand Chief in 1901.

=== Women Operators and the ORT ===
Hattie Todd Pickard, ORT Assistant Chief of Overland Division No. 196 Source: Railroad Telegrapher, May 1897, 402.

The ORT accepted women telegraphers as members from the beginning. The Railroad Telegrapher devoted a column to the issues and concerns of women operators, who played an active role in recruiting new members and participating in the activities of local districts. Hattie Todd Pickard joined the ORT when she began operating for the St. Louis, Iron Mountain & Southern Railway in 1890; after she and her husband moved to Rawlins, Wyoming, in 1892, she began working for the Union Pacific and was elected Assistant Chief of Overland Division No. 196 of the ORT. Katherine B. Davidson, a telegrapher in Cambridge, Ohio, was elected District Representative of the Baltimore and Ohio Railway System, ORT District 33, in 1905. Ola Delight Smith joined the ORT in Gainesville, Georgia, in 1906, and began a long career as a labor organizer and journalist.

=== Impact of Hours of Service Act of 1907 ===
Long working hours were a major issue among railroad telegraphers. Railroad operators were the "air traffic controllers" of the railroads; long hours and the resulting fatigue could result in errors in judgment and serious accidents. In 1907, a bill was introduced in Congress to limit the maximum number of hours that railroad employees had to work in a twenty-four-hour period, known as the La Follette Hours of Service Act, after its chief sponsor, Senator Robert La Follette Sr. of Wisconsin. While this bill did not specifically address railroad telegraphers, a similar bill had been introduced and passed in the House of Representatives to limit the working hours of railroad telegraphers to no more than nine hours in a 24-hour period.

This bill was offered as an amendment to the La Follette bill in the Senate; however, members of the committee to which it was referred bowed to pressure from the railroads and attempted to increase the maximum number of working hours allowed in a single day to twelve hours, a move which enraged ORT members. They immediately began using the telegraph to bombard their congressional representatives with messages of protest, which resulted in the original nine-hour limit being reinstated. The La Follette Hours of Service Act was passed by Congress and signed into law by President Theodore Roosevelt on March 4, 1907.

Although the passage of the Hours of Service Act improved conditions for railroad operators, operators at small stations might still be required to remain "on duty" for as much as twelve hours in a day, or have their total working hours spread over a longer interval, known as a "split trick." The ORT supported an amendment to reduce the workday still further to eight hours and eliminate the split trick. However, the ORT did not coordinate its efforts with the other railroad unions, and when the Adamson Act, passed in 1917, mandated an eight-hour working day for most railroad employees, it did not explicitly include telegraphers.

=== Nationalization of the railroads, 1917-1920 ===
With the entry of the U.S. into the first World War, the railroad and telegraph industries were placed under government control. On December 26, 1917, the United States Railroad Administration (USRA) took control of the railroads. The USRA was generally supportive of the interests of the union members; during the period of nationalization, railroad operators were limited to an eight-hour workday and the ORT was granted collective bargaining capability on a national level. The ORT was able to sign agreements with the Santa Fe, the Missouri-Kansas-Texas Railroad, the Reading Railroad, and the Pennsylvania Railroad. By 1917, ORT membership had grown to 46,000.

A Board of Railroad Wages and Working Conditions was set up by the Railroad Administration. ORT Grand Chief Perham appeared before the Board to request a 40 percent increase in pay, an eight-hour day, and relief from handling government mail by railroad telegraphers. While the Board did provide minimal wage increases, they were far less than the requested 40 percent, and the resulting discontent among ORT members resulted in Perham's defeat in a 1919 election and his replacement as Grand Chief by E. J. Manion. Federal control of the railroads ended on March 1, 1920. When the contracts that had been negotiated while under federal control expired the following year, the ORT had to re-negotiate agreements with the individual railroads.

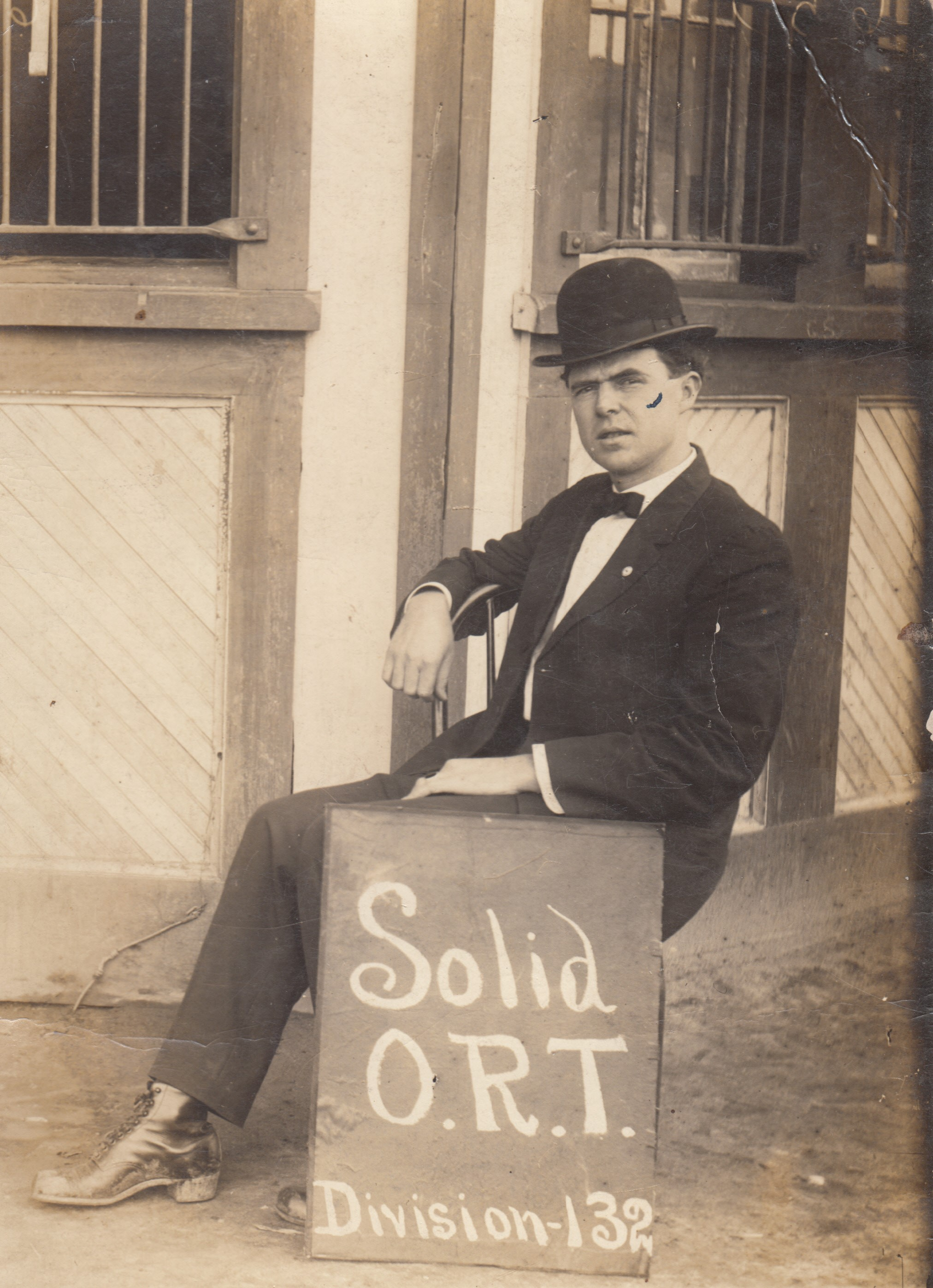
Order of Railroad Telegraphers member, D. J. Kirton, Cades, SC

=== The ORT in the 1920s ===
The early 1920s were the peak years for ORT membership; by 1922, the union boasted 78,000 members in the U.S., Canada, and Mexico. Some railroads, including the Santa Fe, the Louisville and Nashville, and the Great Northern, maintained essentially the same agreements with the ORT that they had established during the years of government control. A dispute with the Atlantic Coast Line led to a strike in 1925 that ended with the railroad making concessions to the union and signing a new agreement.

=== The Great Depression ===
Membership in the ORT began to decline after the stock market crash of 1929, due not only to economic conditions but also to the increasing use of centralized traffic control, which no longer required the presence of a telegrapher in each station. The membership fell to 63,000 in 1929, and continued to fall throughout the Depression years of the 1930s. As a result of the declining membership and the loss of revenue from dues, the ORT was forced to suspend payment of pensions to retired members through the mutual benefit program.

=== The ORT versus Railway Express, 1944 ===
By the beginning of World War II, ORT membership had fallen to around 40,000 as the railroads became involved in the war effort. Railroad telegraphers often had multiple employment as station agents, express agents, and Western Union telegraphers, with each employer paying a portion of the operators' salary. In 1930, the Railway Express Agency, which employed some ORT members as express agents, began handling shipments of perishable items, which had previously been handled as freight shipments on the Seaboard Air Line Railroad. The ORT members who served as express agents as well as telegraphers for the railroad were offered individual pay adjustments on short notice, which the ORT claimed was a violation of the Railway Labor Act of 1926, which required 30 days' notice of any pay adjustment. Additionally, the ORT charged that the individual pay adjustments were in violation of a collective bargaining agreement that had been signed with Railway Express in 1917.

When the company refused to participate in a Board of Adjustment, a suit was brought by the ORT in U.S. District Court. The court's decision in favor of the ORT was reversed by the Circuit Court of Appeals, and the suit was finally brought to the U.S. Supreme Court, which decided in favor of the union in 1944. The Supreme Court decision established the primacy of agreements reached by collective bargaining over individual agreements, and upheld the union's right to engage in collective bargaining on behalf of its members.

=== Name Changes and Final Years ===
The decline of the railroad industry in the 1950s and 1960s led to layoffs and discharges of ORT members. When the ORT attempted to protect its members' jobs by demanding the right to veto job cutbacks, it was accused of "featherbedding," requiring the employment of unnecessary workers, by railroad executives. The ORT called a strike in 1962 to protest layoffs of 600 telegraphers on the Chicago & Northwestern Railroad. A mediation board created by President John F. Kennedy found in favor of the railroad in October 1962, calling the layoffs justified and denying the union the right to veto layoffs. However, the railroad was required to give 90 days' notice to terminated employees, and to pay laid-off telegraphers 60 percent of their annual salary for as much as five years.

In 1965, the ORT changed its name to the Transportation Communications Employees Union; that union was merged into the Brotherhood of Railway & Airline Clerks, Freight Handlers, Express & Station Employees (BRAC) in 1969. At the time of the merger, the ORT had about 30,000 members. In 1985, BRAC chose to revive the TCU identity as the Transportation Communications International Union, and in July 2005, the "new" TCU affiliated with the International Association of Machinists, with full merger to occur no later than January 2012.

== Presidents ==
Until 1897, the post was named "Grand Chief Telegrapher".

1886: Ambrose D. Thurston
1892: D. G. Ramsay
1894: Walker V. Powell
1901: Henry B. Perham
1919: E. J. Manion
1939: V. O. Gardner
1946: George E. Leighty
1968: A. R. Lowry

== See also ==
- History of rail transport in the United States
- List of American railway unions
