= Amalgamated Lithographers of America =

Labor union

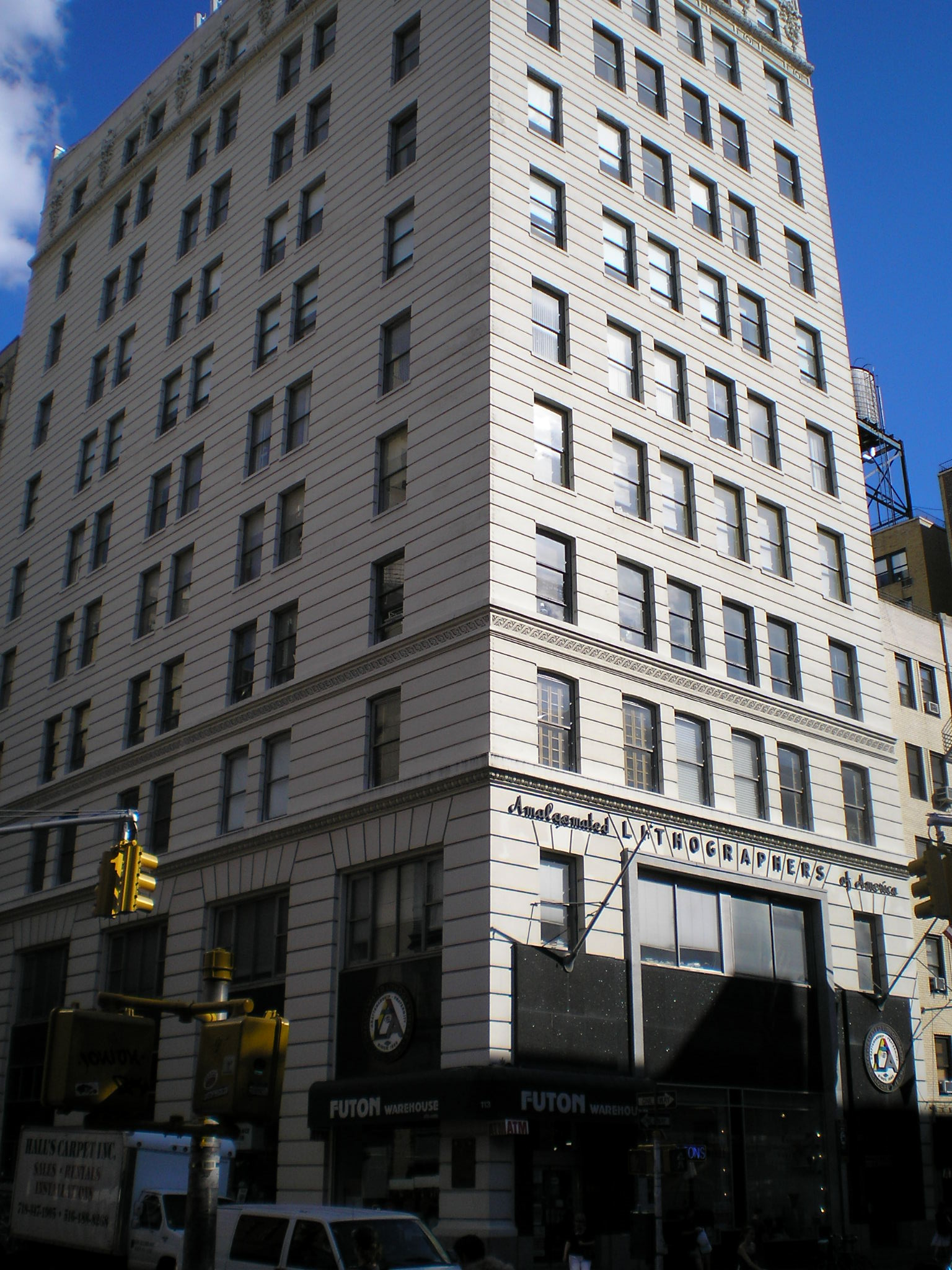
Manhattan headquarters of GCC/IBT-Local One-L, the organizational heir of the Amalgamated Lithographers of America.

The Amalgamated Lithographers of America (ALA) is a labor union formed in 1915 to conduct collective bargaining on behalf of workers in the craft of lithography. The ALA was established through the amalgamation of several small unions already existing in the lithographic industry, one of which dated back to 1886.

The union remained in independent existence for nearly half a century as part of the American Federation of Labor and its successor federation, the AFL-CIO, until combining with the International Photo-Engravers Union (IPEU) to establish the Lithographers and Photoengravers International Union (LPIU) in 1964.

After a series of subsequent organizational mergers, the core of the ALA remains in existence in the 21st Century as Local One-L of the Graphic Communications Conference of the International Brotherhood of Teamsters. Headquarters of the organization are located in New York City.

== History ==
=== Background ===
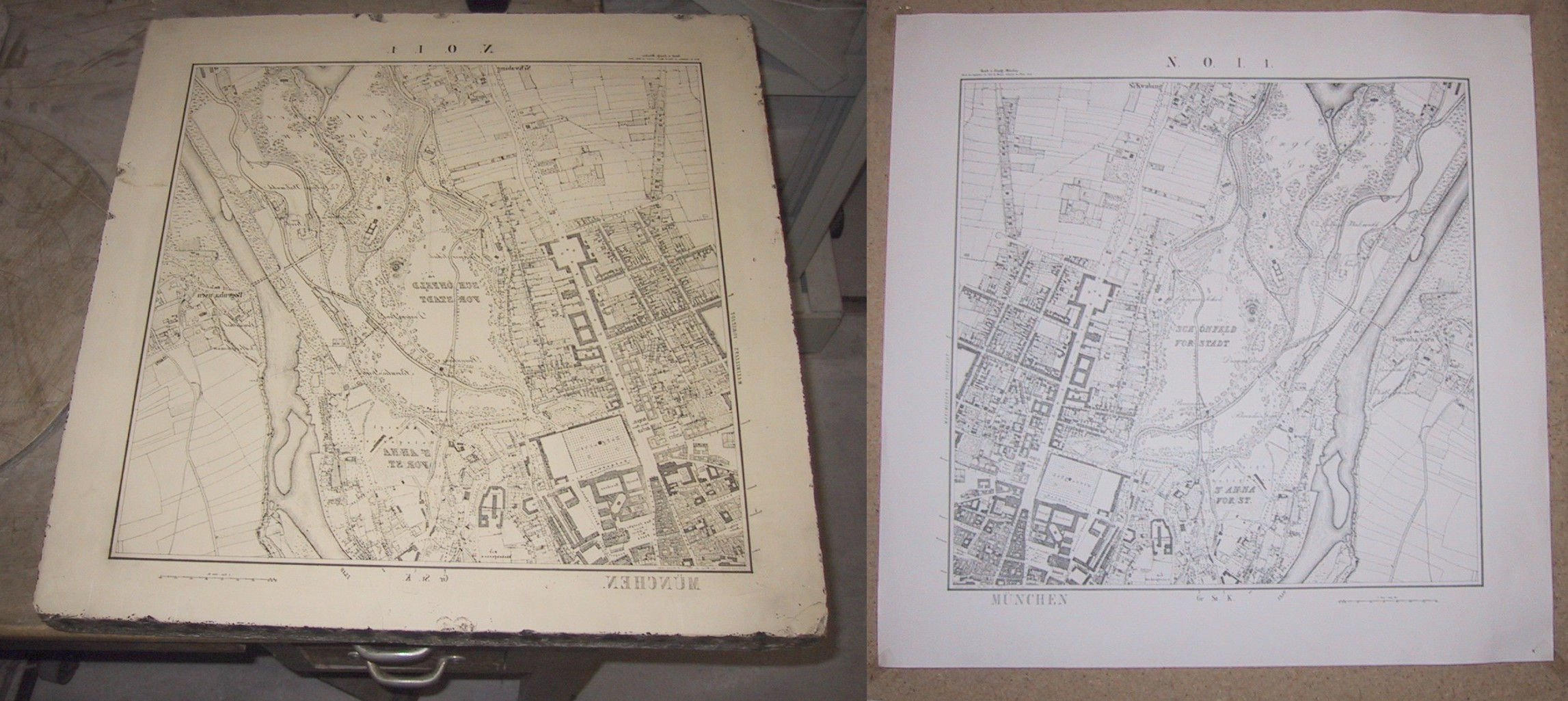
A lithographic stone and a sheet of paper printed from the image chemically etched in the rock.

Traditional lithography is a form of artistic reproduction using techniques first developed around the turn of the 19th century. A drawing is adhered to a smooth stone by means of an oily crayon or ink, with nitric acid applied to the stone and repelled by the oil, instead working on the unmarked areas and leaving the drawing in relief. The process is both labor-intensive and difficult, and therefore costly, although the reproduction of colors by lithographic means frequently results in a brilliance and precision unequaled by other forms of mass reproduction.

Prior to the American Civil War, lithographers began to establish local trade unions in many of the larger cities of the United States of America. Many of these local organizations were destroyed by the economic chaos and unemployment associated with the Panic of 1857 and did not revive until after the conclusion of the war in 1865.

It would not be until 1886 that a permanent national trade union of lithographers was formed. This organization, the Lithographers' International Protective and Beneficial Association of the United States and Canada (LIPBA) was formed as an adjunct of the Knights of Labor, a predecessor and rival to the fledgling American Federation of Labor which favored an industrial form of organization. LIPBA consequently included a wide range of skilled workers among its ranks, including artists, engravers, transferrers, and skilled press operators.

Most of the artists and engravers withdrew from LIPBA in 1890 to form their own organization, the cumbersomely named International Lithographic Artists' and Engravers' Insurance and Protective Association of the United States and Canada (ILAE). Originally conceived as a mutual benefit society, the ILAE rapidly moved into collective bargaining, attempting to use its clout to establish a minimum wage for artistic workers in the industry and to abolish the use of piece work. This agenda lead it into conflict with employers, culminating in a major strike in New York City in 1896 after negotiations with the employers' association of lithographic firms was unsuccessful. The strike was ultimately ended by the use of arbitration, with the final result going far to meet most of the union's demands over wages and working conditions.

Since neither LIPBA (transferrers and press operators) nor ILAE (artists and engravers) would admit the lesser skilled press feeders into their organizations, in 1898 there was a third union formed in the lithographic industry, the International Protective Association of Lithographic Apprentices and Press Feeders of the United States and Canada. In addition, no fewer than three other unions were established in the next two years, each a craft union attempting to carve out a specific niche. These included the Poster Artists' Association of America (PAAA, established 1899), the Paper Cutters Union (established 1900), and the International Association of Stone and Plate Preparers of the United States and Canada (established 1900).

If the workers in the lithographic industry, largely concentrated in New York City, found themselves splintered into six tiny organizations, the major employers in the industry were not. The Lithographers' Association of the Metropolitan District coordinated wages and working hours among lithographic employers in New York City and attempted to hold down costs to enhance the profitability of its members. On March 15, 1904, this employers' association announced a lock out of all union employees, winning ground for the employers in a compromise settlement reached that April. This battle was extended in 1906 by an even larger organization, the National Association of Employing Lithographers, which eliminated two decades of collective bargaining in the industry by successfully establishing an open shop.

The Amalgamated Lithographers of America was the entity formed in response to this growing disparity in power between centrally organized employers and the fragmented and largely impotent small unions of their workers.

=== Establishment ===
Official organ of the ALA during the early 20th Century was the monthly magazine Lithographers Journal.

The Amalgamated Lithographers of America (ALA) was established in 1915 through a merger of 4 of the 6 unions then operating in the lithographic industry — the LIPBA (established 1886), the ILAE (1890), the Paper Cutters (1900), and the Stone and Plate Preparers (1900). The Press Feeders and the Poster Artists' Association initially stood aloof from the new organization, joining only in 1918 and 1942, respectively.

The ALA attempted to affiliate with the American Federation of Labor (AF of L), an umbrella organization joining dozens of craft unions into one entity, but the Federation refused to recognize the new amalgamated union. Instead, the AF of L continued to recognize the LIPBA, which had affiliated with the Federation in 1904 but which no longer existed as an independent entity following the 1915 merger. The next year, the AF of L ordered the new Amalgamated union to join either the International Photo-Engravers Union (IPEU) or the International Printing Pressmen and Assistants' Union (IPPAU), a demand resisted by the ALA.

=== From federation to independence (1946-1958) ===
An uneasy truce followed the refusal of the ALA to merge with the IPEU, during which the Amalgamated was affiliated with the AF of L but sympathies at the Federation's national headquarters lay elsewhere, the two unions staking out their respective membership turf. Discord erupted in 1946 when the AF of L intervened on behalf of the Printing Pressmen in a jurisdictional dispute with the ALA in Atlanta. In retaliation, the ALA withdrew from AF of L membership and joined the rival Congress of Industrial Organizations (CIO).

The 1955 merger of the AF of L and the CIO to form the AFL-CIO brought the ALA within the large federation tent once again, but it soon found its old jurisdictional battles with the IPPAU once again renewed. The majority of voting delegates at conventions of the AFL-CIO sided repeatedly sided with the IPPAU over the ALA whenever jurisdictional battles were brought forward to be adjudicated and in frustration the ALA withdrew once again. This time the ALA abandoned national federation to stake out its course as an independent union — a status it retained until a 1964 merger with the IPEU.

=== 1964 merger with IPEU ===
From 1966 through 1975, the union's Local One in New York City under the leadership of Edward Swayduck (1911–1987) published 39 issues of the quarterly Lithopinion, intended as a showcase of the graphic arts.

=== Subsequent mergers ===
The LPIU was subsequently merged away as part of a 1972 unification with the International Brotherhood of Bookbinders (IBB) to establish the Graphic Arts International Union (GAIU). The GAIU was itself amalgamated with the International Printing and Graphic Communications Union (IPGCU) to form the Graphic Communications International Union (GCIU) in 1983. This organization ultimately became part of the Graphic Communications Conference of the International Brotherhood of Teamsters (GCC-IBT) effective January 1, 2005.

Despite this series of organizational changes, the core of the Amalgamated Lithographers of America continues to have organizational form today as Local One-L of the GCC-IBT.

=== Official organ ===
The official organ of the Amalgamated Lithographers of America was the magazine Lithographers' Journal. The publication was launched in June 1915 and terminated in the summer of 1964. At the time of the 1964 merger with the IPEU, Lithographers' Journal and the IPEU's organ, American Photo Engraver, were similarly joined to form a new publication, Graphic Arts Unionist.

== Presidents ==
1915: Philip Bock
1929: Andrew J. Kennedy
1938: John Blackburn
1955: George A. Canary
1958: F. Patrick Slater
1960: Kenneth J. Brown

== ALA publications ==
- Lithographers' Journal

Vol. 1 (1915-16) | Vol. 2 (1916-17) | Vol. 3 (1917-18) | Vol. 4 (1918-19) | Vol. 5 (1919-20) | Vol. 6 (1920-21) | Vol. 7 (1921-22)
