= James Lynch =

James Lynch may refer to:

- James Lynch (archbishop of Tuam) (1623–1713), Irish Roman Catholic archbishop
- James Lynch (bishop of Kildare and Leighlin) (1807–1896), Irish Roman Catholic bishop
- James B. Lynch (died 1954), Irish Fianna Fáil Party politician, TD and Senator
- James Lynch (musician) (born 1979), guitarist with American punk rock band the Dropkick Murphys
- James Lynch (fitz Ambrose), mayor of Galway, 1590–1591
- James D. Lynch (1839–1872), first African-American Secretary of State of Mississippi
- James S. Lynch (1841–1894), Manitoba physician and political figure
- James M. Lynch (1867–1930), American labor union leader
- James Lynch (baseball) (1888–?), American Negro leagues baseball player
- James Lynch (criminologist) (born 1949), American criminologist
- James Seth Lynch, a fictional character in the video game Kane & Lynch: Dead Men and its 2010 sequel Kane & Lynch 2: Dog Days
- James Lynch (American football) (born 1999), American football defensive tackle
- James Daniel Lynch (1836–1903), American lawyer, judge and writer
- James Lynch (cartoonist) (born 1947), New Zealand cartoonist and conservationist
- Rev James Lynch (1775–1858), Irish Methodist minister and missionary
- James Lynch (fullback) (born 1982), American football fullback

== See also ==
- Jim Lynch (disambiguation)
