= James J. Norton =

American labor union leader

James J. Norton (June 9, 1930 – November 11, 2007) was an American labor union leader.

Born in Boston, Norton became a newspaper photoengraver, and joined the International Photo-Engravers Union of North America, soon serving four terms as president of his local union. In 1963, he began working full-time for the international union, and he continued in the post as it merged into the Lithographers' and Photoengravers' International Union, and then the Graphic Arts International Union (GAIU). In 1978, he was elected as the union's financial and recording secretary, and then secretary-treasurer in 1981.

Norton helped negotiate the 1983 merger of the GAIU into the Graphic Communications International Union, and in 1985, he was elected as president of the union. From 1991, he additionally served as a vice-president of the AFL-CIO. He retired in 2000.

Norton also served as chair of the board of the Federal Reserve Bank of Boston, and was active in the Knights of Columbus.

Trade union offices
Preceded by Kenneth J. Brown	President of the Graphic Communications International Union; 1985–2000	Succeeded by George Tedeschi
