= Jim Lynch (disambiguation) =

Jim Lynch (1945–2022) was an American football player.

Jim Lynch may also refer to:

== Sports ==
- Jim Lynch (Australian footballer) (1882–1919), Australian rules footballer
- Jim Lynch (hurler) (born 1943), Irish retired hurler
- Jim Lynch (ice hockey) (born 1953), Canadian ice hockey player
- Jim Lynch (speed skater) (born 1948), Australian Olympic speed skater
- Jim Lynch, former manager of the Great Britain national speedway team

== Others ==
- Jim Lynch (conservationist) (born 1947), New Zealand cartoonist and conservationist
- Jim Lynch (Survivor), Survivor: Guatemala contestant
- Jim Lynch (writer) (born 1961), American novelist and journalist
- Jim Lynch (politician) (born 1946), Pennsylvania politician
- Jim Lynch (academic), Distinguished Professor at the University of Surrey

== See also ==
- James Lynch (disambiguation)
