= International Photo-Engravers Union of North America =

Former trade union of the United States

International Photo-Engravers' Union of North America (IPEU) was a labor union formed in 1904 to represent halftone photoengravers in the printing industry. Its successor union is the International Brotherhood of Teamsters, Change to Win Federation.

== Formation of publishing unions ==
For several centuries, wood engraving had dominated the publishing industry as the source of graphics. The invention of photography and halftone printing created a new kind of graphic worker—photoengravers. By the mid-1890s, halftone printing had largely replaced wood engraving in the publishing industry.

Although wood engravers had never formed a union, photoengravers did so almost upon the creation of their industry. The first American photoengravers' union, Photo-Engravers of America, was formed in 1886 in New York City.

In 1894, the International Typographical Union (ITU) chartered its first photoengraver's affiliate, New York Photo-Engravers' Union No. 1. The ITU organized a number of photoengravers' unions over the next several years. But many photoengravers felt the ITU leadership, dominated by typographers, did not adequately represent their interests.

In 1899, ITU Photo-Engraver's Union No. 1 went on strike to demand a 48-hour work week. The ITU refused to sanction the walkout, fearing employer retaliation against typographers. The photo-engravers' strike succeeded, which led many photoengravers' unions to conclude that they no longer needed the protection of the ITU.

== Formation of IPEU ==
A number of photoengraving locals held a national convention in Philadelphia in November 1900. Photoengravers from the ITU voted to disaffiliate and — along with some independent unions — voted to establish the International Photo-Engravers' Union of North America.

The ITU, then the American Federation of Labor's largest member, prevented AFL president Samuel Gompers from officially recognizing IPEU for several years. In May 1904, however, ITU agreed to give up jurisdiction over photoengravers and the AFL issued a charter to IPEU.

IPEU's first president was Louis Flader.

Although IPEU only had 2,000 members at its founding, by 1910 the union represented more than 90 percent (7,000) of all photoengravers in the United States and Canada.

== IPEU's first two decades ==
IPEU was the first union in the U.S. to secure a shorter work-week for its members. In addition, because of the chemical hazards involved in halftone photoengraving, the IPEU was also one of the first unions in the country to compel employers to establish health and safety standards.

In 1905, IPEU won the first binding arbitration clause in a contract, and by 1912 the clause was standard throughout the publishing industry.

Flader retired as president of IPEU in 1906, and Matthew Woll was elected in his place. The International Association of Manufacturing Photo-Engravers (IAMPE) then chose Flader as its executive director. Although some in IPEU labeled this "labor treason," Flader and Woll came to a quick accommodation which led to labor peace throughout the publishing industry.

In 1913, IAMPE and IPEU agreed to a cost-setting agreement to standardize rates in the publishing industry. Although challenged under federal antitrust laws, the courts refused to strike down the agreement as an unfair trade practice. The lawsuit, however, led Woll to begin to press Congress for a labor exemption from antitrust legislation — a stand which helped win passage of the Clayton Antitrust Act.

In 1922, IPEU started its first worker training program at the local level.

Woll ruled IPEU with an autocratic style until 1929, when he declined to run for re-election. Woll had been elected a vice president of the AFL, and his duties with the national union were taking up more and more of his time. Woll continued to be involved in IPEU affairs, however, by accepting election as the unions' first vice-president.

== IPEU in the post-war period ==
IPEU won paid vacations in a contract for the first time in 1940.

== Mergers with other unions ==
On Labor Day, 1964, IPEU merged with the Amalgamated Lithographers of America (ALA) to form the Lithographers and Photoengravers International Union (LPIU). The ALA had been formed in 1882 at a time when the consensus was that specialization of union representation was as essential as specialization of tasks in the publishing industry. The merger of IPEU and the lithographers' union was the first official recognition that this consensus was changing in the face of industry pressure, globalization and technological advances.

LPIU instituted its first union-wide training program in 1965.

In 1971, LPIU moved its headquarters from New York City to Washington, D.C.

In 1972, the LPIU merged with the International Brotherhood of Bookbinders (which had been founded by the ITU in 1892) to become the Graphic Arts International Union (GAIU).

Meanwhile, the International Printing Pressmen and Assistants Union (founded in 1889) had merged in 1973 with the Stereotypers/Electrotypers International Union (founded in 1901) to form the International Printing and Graphic Communications Union (IPGCU).

On July 1, 1983, IPGCU merged with GAIU to form the Graphic Communications International Union (GCIU).

On January 1, 2005, GCIU merged with the Teamsters and became the Graphic Communications Council of the International Brotherhood of Teamsters.

== Presidents ==
1901: Louis Flader
1906: Matthew Woll
1929: Edward J. Volz
1954: Wilfrid T. Connell
1962: William J. Hall

== Images ==
Scan of IPEU logo and number 419 from etched Copper Plate.

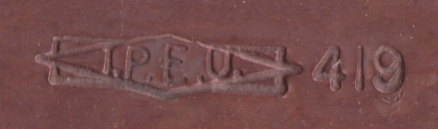
