= Charles P. Howard (labor leader) =

American labor union leader

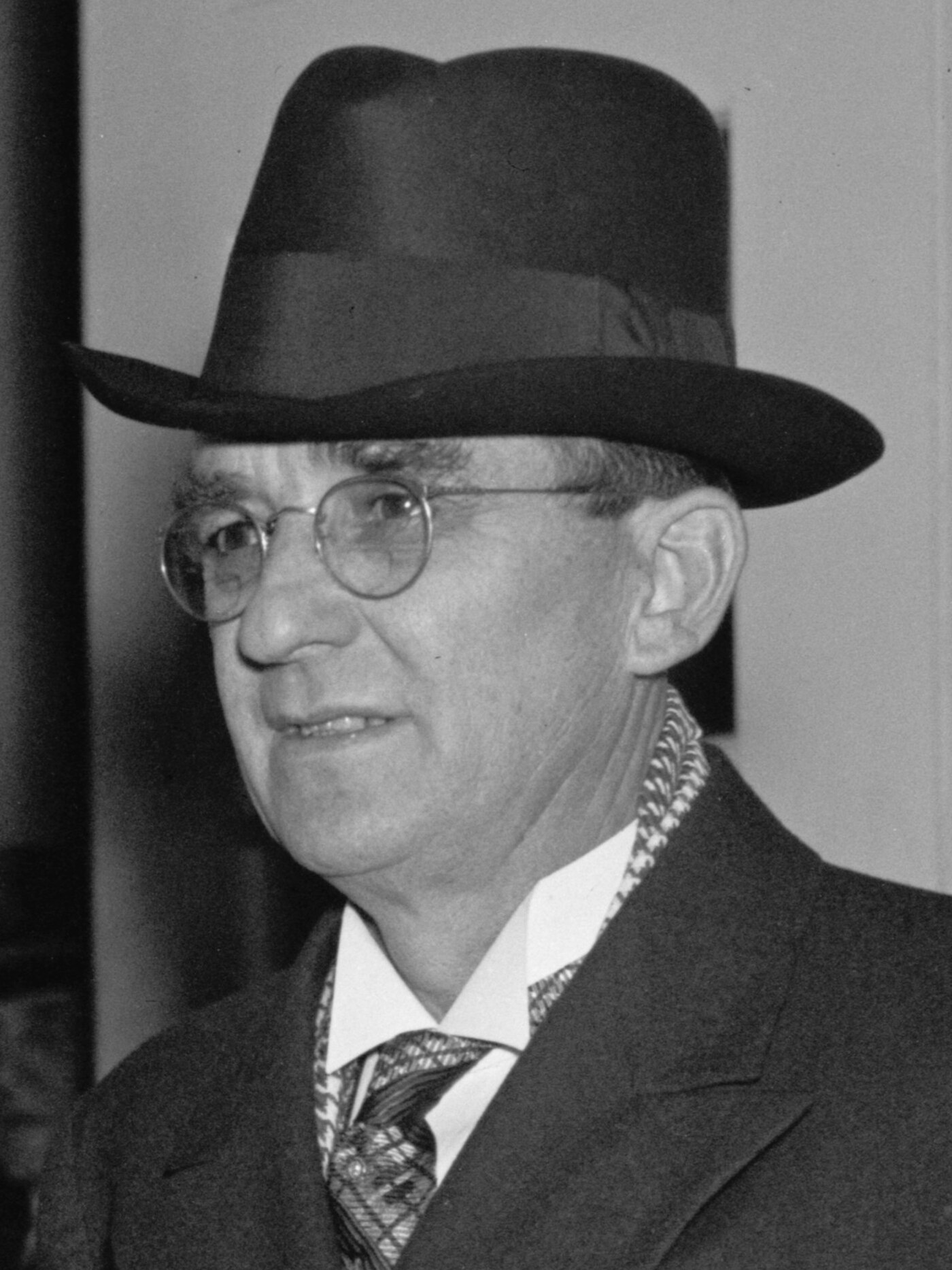
Howard in 1937

Charles Perry Howard (September 14, 1879 – July 21, 1938) was an American labor union leader.

Born in Harvel, Illinois, Howard worked on the railroads and in mining before becoming a printer. In 1907, while living in Tacoma, Washington, he joined the International Typographical Union (ITU). He became president of the union's Portland, Oregon local in 1914, then served as president of the Portland Central Labor Council from 1916. In 1918, he became a Commissioner of Conciliation of the United States Department of Labor.

From 1919 until 1922, Howard edited the Maintenance of Way Journal. In 1922, Howard was elected as the ITU's vice president, and president in 1923, serving continuously in the post from 1926.

Howard supported John L. Lewis' Committee for Industrial Organization, becoming its secretary, although the ITU never formally affiliated to the new federation. He was defeated for re-election as president of the ITU in 1938, but he died of a heart attack before handing over the post.

Trade union offices
Preceded by John McParland	President of the International Typographical Union; 1923–1924	Succeeded by James M. Lynch
Preceded by James M. Lynch	President of the International Typographical Union; 1926–1938	Succeeded by Claude M. Baker
Preceded by New position	Secretary of the Committee for Industrial Organization; 1935–1938	Succeeded by James B. Carey
