= Edward J. Volz =

American labor union leader

Edward John Volz (August 22, 1879 – fl.1964) was an American labor union leader.

Born in Cincinnati, Volz joined the International Photo-Engravers Union of North America. He moved to New York City, and in 1916 was elected as president of the New York Photo-Engravers Union, and also first vice-president of the international union. In 1929, he won election as president of the union, serving until 1954. As leader of the union, he backed the American Federation of Labor and strongly criticized the Congress of Industrial Organizations split.

In 1964, the Photo-Engravers merged into the new Lithographers and Photoengravers International Union. At its founding conference, Volz gave a short speech in support of the merger, reviewing previous unsuccessful attempts to bring the unions together.

Trade union offices
Preceded by Matthew Woll	President of the International Photo-Engravers Union of North America; 1929–1954	Succeeded by Wilfrid T. Connell
Preceded by George J. Richardson; Arnold Zander	American Federation of Labor delegate to the Trades Union Congress; 1948; With: Patrick E. Gorman	Succeeded by Harry C. Bates; Dave Beck
