= Mailer (occupation) =

Newspaper publisher occupation

A mailer is an individual employed by a newspaper publisher to handle newspapers from the point where they emerge from the press to where it is loaded onto trucks or other means of transporting the newspapers.

Preparing newspapers involves identifying the bundles by edition and inserting advertising supplements as well as the physical movement of bundles.

== History ==
Before automation, this was a labor-intensive occupation and at its peak there were thousands of people employed as mailers. In the United States their specialization was incorporated into the International Typographical Union.

Early in the twentieth century there was a division between the higher-skilled typographers and the lower-skilled mailers over whether they should be represented in the same union.
