= Puketahā (wildlife sanctuary) =

Proposed wildlife sanctuary in Wainuiomata, New Zealand

Coordinates: 41°15′45″S 175°00′36″E

Puketahā is a proposed wildlife sanctuary to be established in a water catchment reserve in Wainuiomata, New Zealand.

The proposed sanctuary would involve constructing a 28 kilometres (17 mi) predator-proof fence, enclosing an area of 3,313 hectares (8,190 acres). The forecast cost was NZ$42 million. A study commissioned by Wellington Regional Council and conducted by Jim Lynch, the founder of Zealandia, reported in 2022 that establishing the sanctuary was "technically and practically feasible". In January 2026, it was reported that the fence would protect 7,400 hectares of forest.

The site of the proposed sanctuary is an area to the east of Wainuiomata containing virgin forest that is rare in New Zealand. The forest has never been milled as it is close to the Wainuiomata water catchment area supplying Wellington's water. It would be 15 times as large as the Zealandia sanctuary. Native trees inside the proposed sanctuary include tawa, hīnau, rātā, mataī, miro, and rimu. Of these, rimu is particularly abundant, covering 85% of the sanctuary. The large number of rimu could make it feasible to translocate critically endangered kākāpō birds to the sanctuary, because rimu is important to their breeding success. Other threatened birds such as rowi kiwi and hihi could also be translocated to the sanctuary.

In January 2024, Wellington Regional Council approached central government, seeking funding for initial stages of the project including detailed design, resource consents and development of a full business case and budget.

Possible disadvantages of the project are the costs of fence construction and ongoing monitoring and maintenance, damage to the forest during construction of the fence, and the negative visual impact of tree removal for the fence.

Cameras installed in the area in December 2024 showed kiwi that were released nearby about 20 years ago, but also showed that deer, pigs and goats were more common than had been supposed. These animals destroy seedling trees and the understorey of the forest. The planned fence around the sanctuary will stop large pest animals from entering the area, allowing the understorey to regenerate and increase biodiversity. Regrowth would take about five years and have benefits for wildlife as well as make the forest more resilient to large storms.

While the fence is being constructed, hunters will eradicate deer, goats and pigs in the forest. As well as construction of the fence, more cameras and traps will be installed in the forest. As of 2025, the project is expected to cost $5.9 million over a ten-year period, and is expected to be completed by 2034. The area is not accessible by the public because it is a drinking water supply area, which will limit economic benefits to the local community.
