= Kenneth J. Brown =

Canadian-American labour leader (born 1925)

Kenneth James Brown (1925–July 20, 2016) was a Canadian-born American former labour union leader.

Born in Toronto, Brown became a lithographer in 1942 and joined the Amalgamated Lithographers of America. The following year, he enlisted in the Canadian Military Engineers, and was assigned to produce maps for the Allies during World War II. After D-Day, he traveled through Europe, taking and processing photographs for the purposes of map-making.

After the war, Brown returned to lithography in Toronto. From 1954 to 1960, he was president of his union local, and from 1955 he also served on the union's international council. In 1960, he was elected as the union's president, relocating to the United States.

Brown championed a single industrial union for the printing trades. In 1964, he led the union into a merger which formed the Lithographers' and Photoengravers' International Union, becoming president of the new union. He achieved a second merger in 1972, which formed the Graphic Arts International Union, again with him as president. A final merger, in 1983, formed the Graphic Communications International Union, and Brown again served as its president, until his retirement in 1985.

Brown also served on the executive of the Union Labor Life Insurance Company, and was an AFL-CIO delegate to the British Trades Union Congress. From 1983, he was a vice-president of the AFL-CIO.

Trade union offices
Preceded by F. Patrick Slater	President of the Amalgamated Lithographers of America; 1960–1964	Succeeded by Union merged
Preceded by Union founded	President of the Lithographers' and Photoengravers' International Union; 1964–1973	Succeeded by Union merged
Preceded by Union founded	President of the Graphic Arts International Union; 1973–1983	Succeeded by Union merged
Preceded by Union founded	President of the Graphic Communications International Union; 1983–1985	Succeeded by James J. Norton
Preceded by William Gillen; Herman D. Kenin	AFL-CIO delegate to the Trades Union Congress; 1969; With: C. L. Dennis	Succeeded by I. W. Abel; Teddy Gleason
