= Hūkerenui =

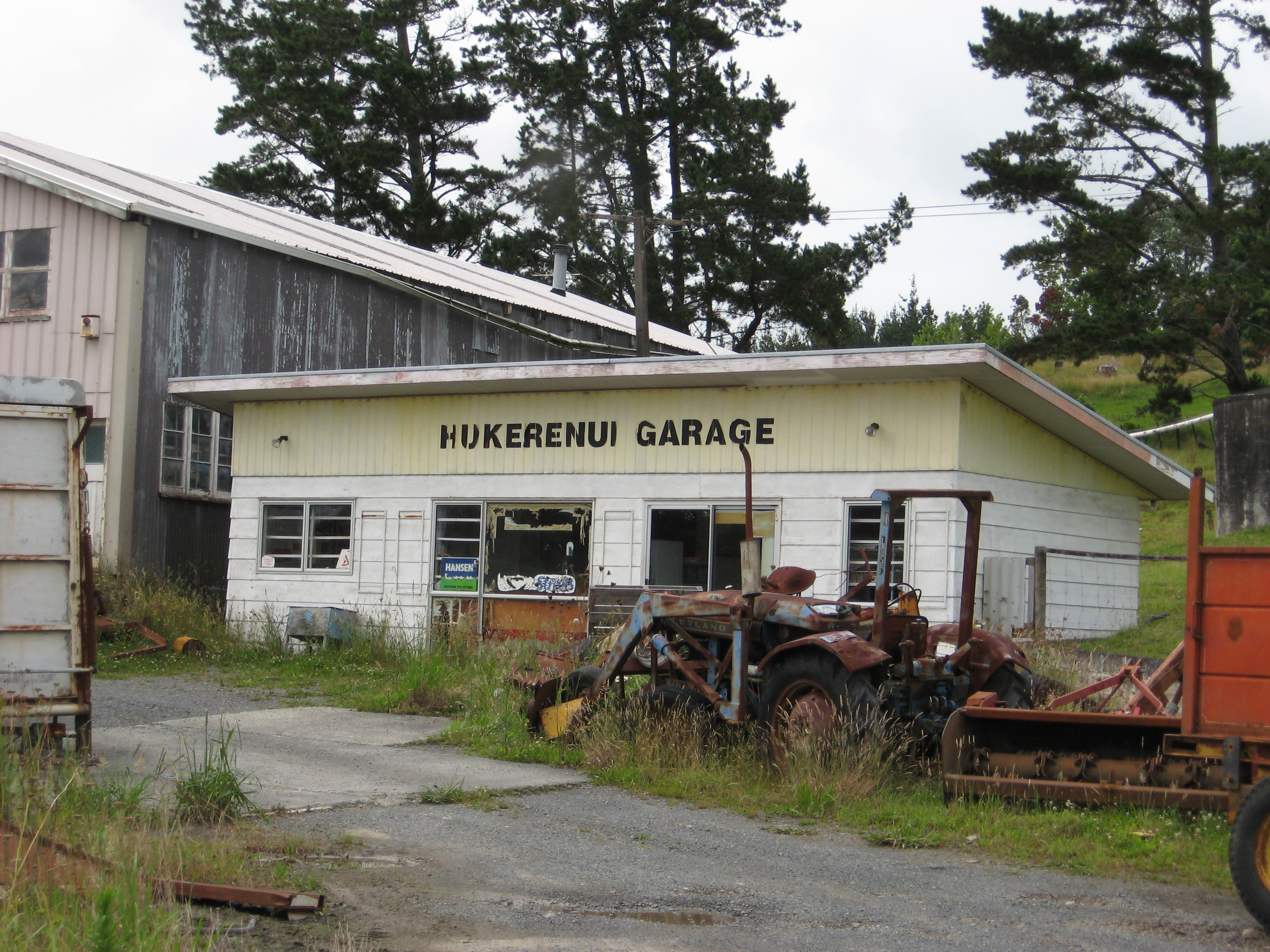
- Hukerenui Garage
- Interactive map of Hūkerenui
- Coordinates: 35°31′13″S 174°12′2″E
- Country: New Zealand
- Region: Northland Region
- District: Whangarei District
- Ward: Hikurangi-Coastal Ward
- Electorates: Northland; Te Tai Tokerau

Government
  - Territorial Authority: Whangarei District Council
  - Regional council: Northland Regional Council
  - Mayor of Whangārei: Ken Couper
  - Northland MP: Grant McCallum
  - Te Tai Tokerau MP: Mariameno Kapa-Kingi

Area
  - Total: 22.83 km^{2} (8.81 sq mi)

Population (2023 Census)
  - Total: 204
  - Density: 8.94/km^{2} (23.1/sq mi)

Hūkerenui is a settlement in Northland, New Zealand. State Highway 1 passes through the area. Kawakawa is northwest, and Hikurangi is southeast.

The New Zealand Ministry for Culture and Heritage gives a translation of "large cascade" for Hukerenui.

== History ==
The settlement began as Hukerenui South in 1886, with a request made by a group of local people for the land under the Village Homestead Special Settlement system. The village was opened to the first 25 settler families the following year. Although the main road from Whangārei to Kawakawa passed through it, the road was only a dirt track, and was impassable during winter. Gum digging was one of the initial sources of income, but the Government cancelled gum-digging licences after fires in early 1888. A flax mill at Towai provided some jobs. Some were employed to build and improve the roads.

The North Auckland railway line reached Hūkerenui in 1901 or 1902. (Note: Menefy says 1902; Hansen and Neil say it was opened 1 March 1901.) It was extended north to Towai in February or May 1910, and to Kawakawa in 1912 or 1911. (Note: First date given is Menefy's, second is Hansen's.)

In 2019, the name of the locality was officially gazetted as Hūkerenui.

== Demographics ==
Hūkerenui and its surrounds comprise an SA1 statistical area which covers 22.83 km^{2} (8.81 sq mi). The SA1 area is part of the larger Mangakahia-Hūkerenui statistical area.

Historical population for Hūkerenui and surrounds
| Year | Pop. | ±% p.a. |
|---|---|---|
| 2006 | 189 | — |
| 2013 | 192 | +0.23% |
| 2018 | 195 | +0.31% |
| 2023 | 204 | +0.91% |

Hūkerenui had a population of 204 in the 2023 New Zealand census, an increase of 9 people (4.6%) since the 2018 census, and an increase of 12 people (6.2%) since the 2013 census. There were 108 males and 93 females in 63 dwellings. 2.9% of people identified as LGBTIQ+. The median age was 39.7 years (compared with 38.1 years nationally). There were 39 people (19.1%) aged under 15 years, 42 (20.6%) aged 15 to 29, 90 (44.1%) aged 30 to 64, and 30 (14.7%) aged 65 or older.

People could identify as more than one ethnicity. The results were 88.2% European (Pākehā), 23.5% Māori, 1.5% Pasifika, 1.5% Asian, and 2.9% other, which includes people giving their ethnicity as "New Zealander". English was spoken by 98.5%, Māori language by 4.4%, and other languages by 11.8%. No language could be spoken by 1.5% (e.g. too young to talk). New Zealand Sign Language was known by 1.5%. The percentage of people born overseas was 16.2, compared with 28.8% nationally.

Religious affiliations were 27.9% Christian, 1.5% Buddhist, and 1.5% New Age. People who answered that they had no religion were 63.2%, and 4.4% of people did not answer the census question.

Of those at least 15 years old, 24 (14.5%) people had a bachelor's or higher degree, 102 (61.8%) had a post-high school certificate or diploma, and 30 (18.2%) people exclusively held high school qualifications. The median income was $41,700, compared with $41,500 nationally. 15 people (9.1%) earned over $100,000 compared to 12.1% nationally. The employment status of those at least 15 was that 99 (60.0%) people were employed full-time, 21 (12.7%) were part-time, and 6 (3.6%) were unemployed.

=== Mangakahia-Hūkerenui statistical area ===
Mangakahia-Hūkerenui covers 659.25 km^{2} (254.54 sq mi) and had an estimated population of 2,130 as of June 2025, with a population density of 3.2 people per km^{2}.

Historical population for Mangakahia-Hūkerenui
| Year | Pop. | ±% p.a. |
|---|---|---|
| 2006 | 1,683 | — |
| 2013 | 1,641 | −0.36% |
| 2018 | 1,923 | +3.22% |
| 2023 | 2,028 | +1.07% |

Mangakahia-Hūkerenui had a population of 2,028 in the 2023 New Zealand census, an increase of 105 people (5.5%) since the 2018 census, and an increase of 387 people (23.6%) since the 2013 census. There were 1,041 males, 972 females and 12 people of other genders in 645 dwellings. 2.8% of people identified as LGBTIQ+. The median age was 37.0 years (compared with 38.1 years nationally). There were 453 people (22.3%) aged under 15 years, 375 (18.5%) aged 15 to 29, 909 (44.8%) aged 30 to 64, and 291 (14.3%) aged 65 or older.

People could identify as more than one ethnicity. The results were 70.7% European (Pākehā); 47.2% Māori; 3.4% Pasifika; 1.9% Asian; 0.3% Middle Eastern, Latin American and African New Zealanders (MELAA); and 1.9% other, which includes people giving their ethnicity as "New Zealander". English was spoken by 97.3%, Māori language by 12.4%, Samoan by 0.3%, and other languages by 4.1%. No language could be spoken by 1.9% (e.g. too young to talk). New Zealand Sign Language was known by 0.6%. The percentage of people born overseas was 9.2, compared with 28.8% nationally.

Religious affiliations were 27.7% Christian, 0.1% Islam, 6.7% Māori religious beliefs, 0.4% Buddhist, 0.6% New Age, 0.1% Jewish, and 0.9% other religions. People who answered that they had no religion were 57.1%, and 6.8% of people did not answer the census question.

Of those at least 15 years old, 153 (9.7%) people had a bachelor's or higher degree, 927 (58.9%) had a post-high school certificate or diploma, and 441 (28.0%) people exclusively held high school qualifications. The median income was $32,200, compared with $41,500 nationally. 99 people (6.3%) earned over $100,000 compared to 12.1% nationally. The employment status of those at least 15 was that 735 (46.7%) people were employed full-time, 240 (15.2%) were part-time, and 75 (4.8%) were unemployed.

== Education ==
Hukerenui School Years 1–8 is a coeducational full primary (years 1–8) school with a roll of 166 students as of July 2026. The school was founded in 1889, and amalgamated with other small schools to a new site in 1949. Hukerenui School moved in 1975 to the site of the former Hukerenui District High School. It changed its name from "Hukerenui School" to "Hukerenui School Years 1–8" in 1997.

The school included a Form 3 class in 1946, and this was expanded into a secondary department. This eventually split to form the Hukerenui District High School, which operated from March 1957 to December 1972.

== Notable people ==
- Jim Lynch (born 1947), conservationist and cartoonist, grew up in Hūkerenui
