= Woodruff Randolph =

American trade unionist (1892–1966)

- Born: January 31, 1892; Warrenton, Missouri, U.S.
- Died: October 24, 1966 (aged 74); Colorado Springs, Colorado, U.S.
- Education: Webster College of Law (LLB)
- Organization: International Typographical Union

Woodruff Randolph (January 31, 1892 – October 24, 1966) was an American labor union leader.

Born in Warrenton, Missouri, Randolph became a typesetter in 1912, also joining the International Typographical Union (ITU). In his spare time, he studied at the Webster College of Law, and was admitted to the bar in Illinois in 1921. He remained active in the ITU, and in 1927/1928 served as president of the Chicago Typographical Union local. In 1928, he was elected as secretary-treasurer of the ITU, also becoming secretary-treasurer of the Union Printers Home Corporation and of the International Allied Printing Trades Association, as well as editor of the Typographical Journal, the union's regular publication.

In 1936, Randolph was a delegate to the International Labor Office Conference in Geneva. Over time, he raised his profile in the union sufficiently that in the union's 1944 presidential election, he defeated the incumbent, Claude M. Baker. As leader, he opposed the Taft–Hartley Act, which meant unions could not enforce the closed shop. Under his leadership, there was a major ITU strike in Chicago, which succeeded in retaining the closed shop there. Randolph subsequently created Unitypo, a union newspaper for distribution in cities where the ITU was on strike.

Randolph retired at the end of 1957, on health grounds. He died of a "heart ailment" on October 24, 1966, in Colorado Springs, Colorado.

Trade union offices
Preceded by John W. Hays	Secretary-Treasurer of the International Typographical Union; 1929–1944	Succeeded by Jack Gill
Preceded by Claude M. Baker	President of the International Typographical Union; 1944–1957	Succeeded by Elmer Brown
