= International Stereotypers' and Electrotypers' Union =

The International Stereotypers' and Electrotypers' Union (ISEU) was a labor union representing workers in two related trades in the United States and Canada.

== History ==
The union was founded in August 1902, as a split from the International Typographical Union, and was immediately chartered by the American Federation of Labor. By 1926, it had 7,000 members. The union later affiliated to the AFL–CIO, and by 1957, its membership had risen to 13,577.

In 1971, the union renamed itself as the International Stereotypers', Electrotypers' and Platemakers' Union. On 1 October 1973, it merged with the International Printing Pressmen and Assistants' Union of North America, to form the International Printing and Graphic Communications Union.

== Presidents ==
1902: James J. Freel
1924: Thomas P. Reynolds
1925: Winfield T. Keegan
1933: Leon DeVeze
1938: Leo J. Buckley
1955: James H. Sampson
