= Anthony J. DeAndrade =

Anthony Joseph DeAndrade (June 1896 – January 20, 1970) was an American labor unionist.

Born in Cambridge, Massachusetts, DeAndrade worked as a printer, and joined the International Printing Pressmen and Assistants' Union of North America. In 1919, he was elected president of his local, the Boston Press Assistants Union, and from 1931 he worked full-time as a representative of the international union. During World War II, he served on numerous trilateral dispute resolution panels. He also served three years as vice-president of the Massachusetts Federation of Labor, and lectured at the Massachusetts Institute of Technology, and at Boston University.

In 1945, DeAndrade was elected as a vice-president of the international union; then in 1959, he was elected as the union's president. In 1962, he represented the United States at the International Labour Organization's printing and allied trades meeting in Geneva; then in 1963, he was the delegate of the AFL-CIO to the British Trades Union Congress. In 1965, he was elected as a vice-president of the AFL-CIO.

In 1964, John F. Kennedy appointed DeAndrade to the labor advisory committee of the President's Committee on Equal Employment Opportunity. He died of a heart attack in 1970 while still in office.

Trade union offices
Preceded by Thomas Dunwoody	President of the International Printing Pressmen and Assistants' Union; 1959–1970	Succeeded by Alexander J. Rohan
Preceded by John M. Elliott; Jack Knight	AFL-CIO delegate to the Trades Union Congress; 1963; With: William J. Farson	Succeeded by Max Greenberg; David Sullivan
