= Alexander J. Rohan =

Alexander John Rohan (February 2, 1911 – December 30, 1985) was an American labor union leader.

Born in Haverstraw, New York, Rohan was educated in Yonkers, New York, and in 1932 began work at Turner Press, a commercial printing plant. That year, he joined the International Printing Pressmen and Assistants' Union of North America (IPPU). He soon became a delegate to the city's Central Labor Council.

Rohan moved to Washington D.C. in 1938, working full-time for the union after World War II. He represented the union in cases before the Wage Stabilization Board and the National Labor Relations Board. He also spent time on secondment to the United States Department of State and the United States Department of Labor, during which time he was a special advisor to the Japanese labor movement.

Rohan became a vice-president of the IPPU in 1953, and was then elected as secretary-treasurer in 1961. In 1970, he was elected as the union's president, defeating Walter Turner. The same year, he was elected as a vice-president of the AFL-CIO. He negotiated a merger in 1973 which formed the International Printing and Graphic Communications Union, becoming the new union's founding president, but retired from the union the following year.

Rohan stood down from his AFL-CIO post in 1974. In retirement, he served on the Foreign Service Selection Board.

Trade union offices
Preceded by George L. Googe	Secretary-Treasurer of the International Printing Pressmen and Assistants' Union; 1961–1970	Succeeded by J. Frazier Moore
Preceded by Anthony J. DeAndrade	President of the International Printing Pressmen and Assistants' Union; 1970–1973	Succeeded by Union merged
Preceded by Union founded	President of the International Printing and Graphic Communications Union; 1973–1974	Succeeded by Sol Fishko
