= International Typographical Union =

North American trade union

- Abbreviation: ITU
- Successor: Communications Workers of America; International Brotherhood of Teamsters
- Formation: May 3, 1852
- Dissolved: December 31, 1986
- Type: Trade union
- Headquarters: Indianapolis, Indiana, US (Note: From 1888 to 1963.); Colorado Springs, Colorado, US (Note: From 1963 to 1986.)
- Locations: Canada; United States
- Secessions: International Brotherhood of Bookbinders; International Photo-Engravers Union of North America; International Printing Pressmen's Union of North America; International Stereotypers' and Electrotypers' Union
- Affiliations: AFL–CIO; Canadian Labour Congress
- Formerly called: National Typographical Union

The International Typographical Union (ITU) was a North American trade union for the printing trade of newspapers and other media. It was founded on May 3, 1852, in the United States as the National Typographical Union. It changed its name to the International Typographical Union at its Albany, New York, convention in 1869 after it began organizing members in Canada. The ITU was one of the first unions to admit female members, admitting women members such as Augusta Lewis, Mary Moore and Eva Howard in 1869.

Typographers were educated, economically mobile, and in every major urban center with newspapers, and they had the unique possibility to influence publicity in favour of their cause. This led the union to the forefront of improving working conditions. ITU President W. B. Prescott led the ITU in 1897 to win a 48-hour work week and a standard wage scale for all printers. During the Great Depression, the ITU introduced the 40-hour work week across the industry at no cost to employers as a way to share the fewer jobs available. That ITU initiative spread to other unions and has since been codified across the labor sector by federal legislation in the US establishing the 40-hour work week.

The ITU had a unique system of factional opposition in its democratic elections, documented by Seymour Martin Lipset in his co-authored book Union Democracy: The Internal Politics of the International Typographical Union (1957). The local scale committees worked for a decent wage while the executive council sent ITU representatives to assist local unions in contract negotiations. All contracts had to be approved and ratified by both the Executive Council and the newspaper publisher. For most of its history, the ITU benefited from friendly and strong competition between Independents and Progressives for control of the union.

As the work of typographers declined with automation, computers and mechanization of the print media, the ITU was disbanded. In 1986, a majority of ITU mailers voted to merge with the International Brotherhood of Teamsters and the remaining typographers joined the Communications Workers of America. Before its dissolution, the ITU was the oldest union in the United States.

== History ==
=== Formation ===
The concept for a typographical union was formed at a New York City meeting of 18 representatives from typographers' associations in New York, New Jersey, Pennsylvania, Maryland and Kentucky in December 1850. A committee led by John Keyser of Philadelphia was formed to investigate issues and propose a plan of action.

The representatives met again in Baltimore in September 1851. While they resolved to form a national union, no other actions were taken.

Finally, delegates from typographers' unions in 14 cities met in Cincinnati in May 1852 and organized the National Typographical Union. A random drawing enabled the Indianapolis local to become Local Union #1 and the new headquarters. In 1869, a new Constitution was adopted, accepting the affiliation of Canadian printing trade unions and changing the name to the International Typographical Union. In 1873, in Montreal, Canada, the first ITU convention outside the United States was held. The ITU Book of Laws would be amended many times, yet it was as members called it "ITU Law." Each union shop was a "Chapel" and the shop steward was the "Chapel Chairman". All apprentices and journeymen had to have working cards showing paid union dues. ITU Law dictated that dues, which were proportionate to the amount of work done in the chapel, had to be paid by the first Tuesday after the last Saturday of the month. If the Union dues were not paid, the member was not allowed to work until their payment.

=== Fragmentation ===
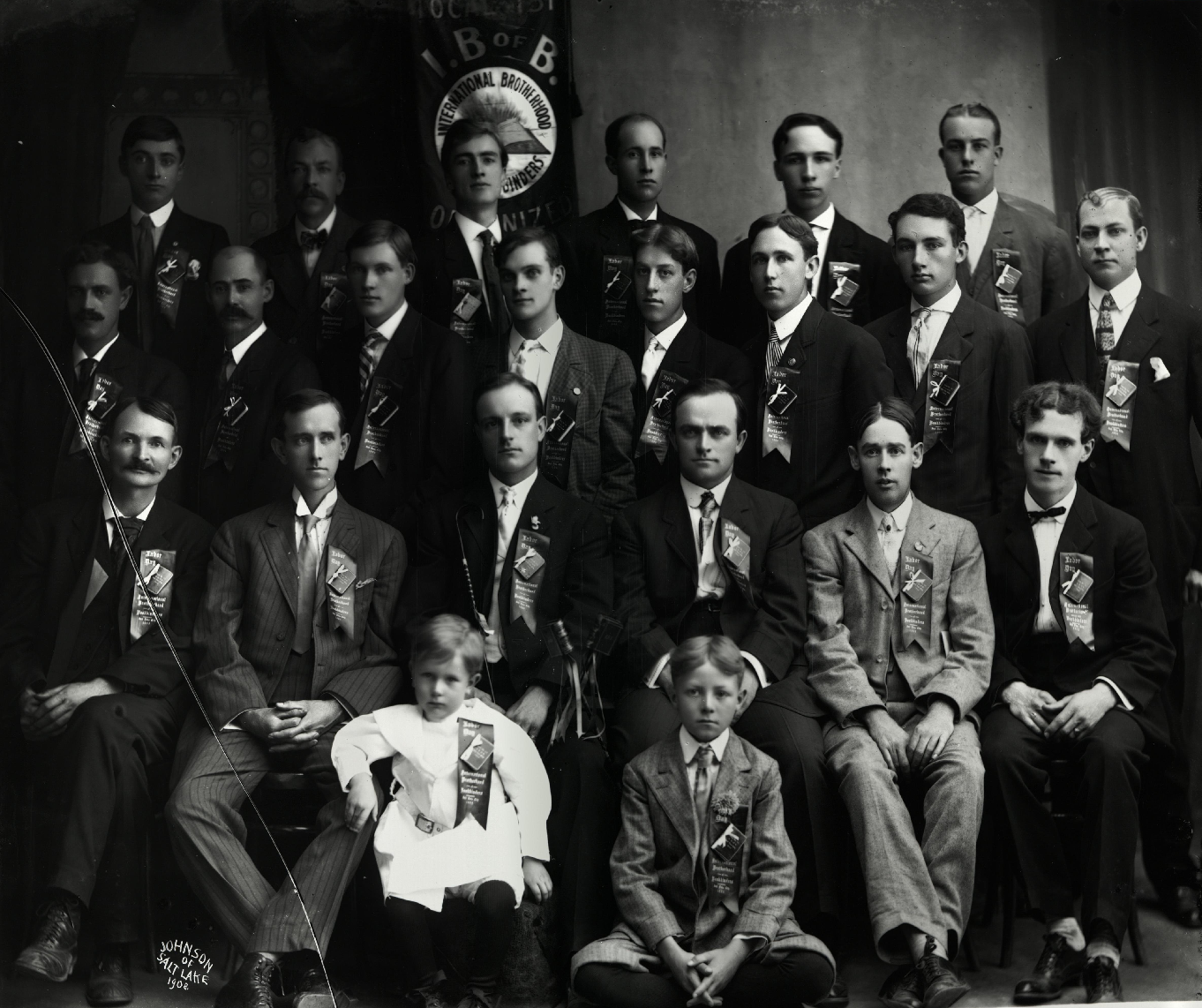
The International Brotherhood of Bookbinders in Salt Lake City, Utah, in 1908

Technological developments in the late 19th century such as the development of lithography and photography led to diversification and specialization among printers. Further fragmentation in the printing labor movement led to the establishment of the International Printing Pressmen's Union of North America (IPPU), in 1889. In 1892, the ITU authorized membership for mailers and for newspaper writers. Pressure mounted for a separate pressman's union, and in 1892 the International Brotherhood of Bookbinders (IBB) was formed. Many pressmen left the ITU for the Bookbinders. At the same time as mailers joined, two thousand pressmen members seceded to form the International Printing Pressmen Union Assistants, (IPPUA) in 1897 and the International Stereotypers' and Electrotypers' Union, (IS&EU) in 1902. At the start of the 20th century, ITU membership was primarily compositors and mailers.

In 1894, the Louisville convention sought to have president W. B. Prescott examine ways to have newer technology under the ITU. Then, the ITU chartered a photoengravers' union in New York City. Over the next few years, the ITU organized photoengravers in several other cities as well. However, many photoengravers felt that the leaders of the ITU were indifferent to their needs.

In 1899, photoengravers in New York City went on strike to demand a 48-hour work week. ITU President S. B. Donnelly refused to support the local, fearing employers might retaliate. The New York City photoengravers won their strike, but the lack of ITU support led most of the union's photoengraver locals to seek disaffiliation. A national convention in Philadelphia in November 1900 saw the photoengravers leaving the ITU and establishing the International Photo-Engravers Union of North America. ITU President James M. Lynch pressured the AFL into refusing to recognize the photoengravers' union until May 1904.

In 1893, the ITU struck Harrison Gray Otis's Los Angeles Times. In 1896, the union began a boycott that ran until 1908. In 1903, ITU President James M. Lynch, persuaded William Randolph Hearst to start a rival paper, the Los Angeles Examiner.

On October 1, 1910, James B. Mc Namara, an ITU member and his brother. Joseph J. Mc Namara, secretary-treasurer of the International Union of Bridge and Structural Iron Workers placed a bomb in the L.A. Times building, killing 21 people. Famed attorney Clarence Darrow defended the brothers. They were convicted of the bombing and murder. Despite various job actions that lasted into the 1920s, the L.A. Times remained a non-union shop. This was a major defeat for both the ITU and other trade unions; Los Angeles and Southern California would be lost to trade unions except in the case of the entertainment industry.

=== AFL ===
As early as 1879, the International Typographical Union was at the forefront of organized labor. The ITU was instrumental in the formation of the Federation of Organized Trades and Labor Unions in 1882. In the same time frame, the ITU rejected the Knights of Labor. In the American Federation of Labor (AFL) presidential election of 1881, William H. Foster of the ITU defeated Samuel Gompers. In 1886, the Cigar Makers' Union leader, Samuel Gompers, was elected AFL president. The ITU was the largest and strongest union in the AFL. By the end of the 19th century, ITU President S. B. Donnelly called the ITU the "strongest and most stable printing union in the United States". In 1924, William Green succeeded Gompers as AFL president. The seeds of discord between the AFL and ITU were sown.

=== Fight for better working conditions ===
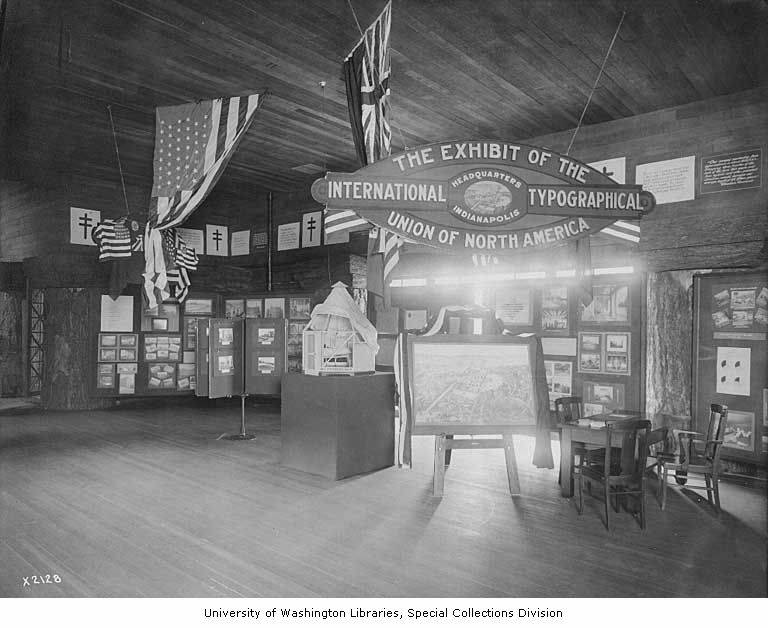
International Typographical Union exhibit at the Alaska–Yukon–Pacific Exposition, Seattle, 1909

From October 1891, the ITU Mortuary Benefits were the most respected in trade unionism.

In 1906, ITU President James M. Lynch decided to use strong tactics and initiated strikes in most major cities, attempting to secure an eight-hour work day. The union had lost a fight for a nine-hour day a few years earlier; however, this time, the union spent over US$4 million supporting its striking locals. Not only did the ITU win an eight-hour work day, but the ITU strike paved the way for similar gains by the five other printing unions.

The ITU was a democratic labor union. Members served a five-year apprenticeship and were tested to become journeymen. The Progressives and Independents gave the union a two-party organization. The Progressive party gave most of the leaders to the ITU.

In 1907, ITU President James M. Lynch appointed a special committee, "to formulate some system for the technical trade education of our members and apprentices." The committee selected, and President Lynch accepted, the ITU Course of Instruction: thirty-six "Lessons in Printing". Courses were first offered to members of Chicago Typographical #16 by The Inland Printer Technical School of Chicago. Alumni would include future ITU presidents, Woodruff Randolph and John J. Pilch.

In 1914, ITU President James M. Lynch resigned, appointed by Governor Martin H. Glynn as New York State Commissioner of Labor. Many printers in the New York "Big 6" Local, saw the political appointment, a way to remove Lynch from dealing with newspaper publishers. James M. Lynch would serve as ITU president 1925–1926. Employers sought concessions after World War I as part of their 'open shop' movement. A key goal was to lengthen the work day to 10 to 12 hours. The wartime ITU president Marsden G. Scott fought back with massive strikes all over the country. In one period (May to December 1921), new ITU president John McParland could say the defense fund was secure as the union collected over $6 million in strike donations and spent $5.5 million in strike benefits.

By June 1924, employers had had enough. The three-year running battle with the union had cost owners dearly and the union preserved its gains. However, the win was one that had cost the health of ITU president, John McParland, who served from 1921–1923. Charles P. Howard served out the rest of 1923 as ITU president; being elected in 1924 and serving until 1938.

=== ITU role in forming the CIO ===
The ITU had been active in organizing new workers for almost 80 years. As the Great Depression created a crisis for American workers, the ITU joined with other unions in the AFL to agitate for more organizing.

In 1935, Charles P. Howard, president of the ITU, joined with John L. Lewis of the United Mine Workers; David Dubinsky of the International Ladies' Garment Workers' Union; Sidney Hillman of the Amalgamated Clothing Workers of America; Thomas McMahon of the United Textile Workers; John Sheridan of the International Union of Mine, Mill and Smelter Workers; Harvey Fremming of the Oil Workers Union and Max Zaritsky of the Hatters, Cap and Millinery Workers to form the Committee for Industrial Organization within the AFL.

In 1937, ITU Secretary Randolph was livid at AFL President William Green. The AFL executive council levied an assessment to fight industrial organization upon allied unions. The ITU refused to pay; Randolph's reason was "not to pay any assessment levied by any means other than a referendum vote of ITU printers and mailers."

The craft unions within the AFL demanded that the committee stop organizing members on an industrial basis. Lewis and the other members of the CIO persisted.

In 1938, the AFL ejected the eight member unions of the CIO, including the ITU. At the 1938, ITU convention at Birmingham, Alabama, President Claude M. Baker disclosed to the delegates the decision of the AFL. Three unions returned to the AFL. On May 21, 1941, the ITU turned down reaffiliation with the AFL by referendum vote of the ITU members. During its time in the CIO, the union experienced a brief growth in members, topping out at 84,200 in 1939. The increase was notable, but moderate as production swung towards heavy industry during World War II. In 1944, the ITU reaffiliated with the American Federation of Labor. The AFL promised the ITU full autonomy. ITU President Woodruff Randolph and AFL President William Green re-established and re-affirmed the ITU–AFL relationship, as if no breach had taken place. The five remaining unions subsequently formed the Congress of Industrial Organizations. The CIO rejoined the AFL in 1955, forming the new entity known as the AFL–CIO. AFL–CIO President George Meany and his successors would have a cool relationship with all ITU presidents from Randolph to Bingle. ITU President Joe Bingle asked AFL–CIO President Lane Kirkland to speak at the 1983 San Francisco ITU Convention; Kirkland declined.

=== Woodruff Randolph ===
Woodruff Randolph (1892–1966), a printer from Chicago #16 and attorney-at-law, served as ITU Secretary-Treasurer (1929–1944) and ITU President (1944–1957). Randolph was very powerful and often usurped the position of ITU president Claude M. Baker. The ITU presidential election of 1944 between Baker and Randolph was one of the most vicious in union history. He loathed the National Labor Relations Board. During World War II, Randolph dealt with the National War Labor Board. He led the Progressive party of the ITU. At the 1949 Oakland ITU convention, he spoke in harsh terms against the Taft–Hartley Act, the act in favor of the open shop. Chicago #16, Randolph's home local, was the first local hit by Taft-Hartley. On November 24, 1947 the Chicago papers went on a strike that lasted 22 months. Newspaper publishers called for aid from the authors of the law, US Senator Robert A. Taft (R.-Ohio) and Congressman Fred A. Hartley, Jr. (R.-New Jersey) The ITU and Woodruff Randolph won in Chicago. He fought publishers and won in the early 1950s. In 1951, Randolph created Unitypo, the union-supported newspaper in struck cities. Unitypo met with mixed results from the public at large. In the mid-1950s, Randolph embodied the ITU; his power was felt in every ITU shop and feared in every newspaper's board room. The printers were shocked during the 1957 ITU convention in New York to find that Randolph would not seek reelection.

Woodruff Randolph hand-picked the Progressives to run for executive council in 1958, which would control the ITU for nearly twenty years. At the same time United States Senator John McClellan (D.-AR) was investigating organized crime in labor unions. When Dave Beck, president of the Teamsters, resigned in 1957—near the time of Randolph's statement of retirement—many ITU members wondered about their long-time leader. The new ITU President Elmer Brown meekly appeared before the US Senate Select Committee on Improper Activities in Labor and Management. Brown had been ITU second Vice-President (1944–1949) and had served in various offices in his home local, New York Typographical #6 (1945–1957). Brown claimed that during the 1957 ITU convention, Randolph requested Brown run for president of the ITU. Brown told the committee that he had not been aware of events in Indianapolis since he left the Executive Council. Randolph retired to his homes in Indiana and Florida, October 1, 1966, he died in the Union Printers Home.

=== Printing decline ===
Woodruff Randolph's hand-picked Progressive Executive Council held the longest tenure as a unit in ITU history: from 1958–1978, its membership was Elmer Brown, president; John J. Pilch, first vice-president; Alexander Sandy Bevis, second vice-president (Canadian); Joseph P. Bailey, third vice-president (Mailer). Secretary-treasurer Don Hurd died in 1959, succeeded by William R. Cloud. After Elmer Brown's 1968 death, the ITU presidents were Pilch (1968–1973) and Bevis (1974–1978).

The Mergenthaler linotype machine was used by newspaper printers from the 1880s to the 1970s. Technological progress again confronted the ITU in the post-war period. A number of new advances—including offset lithography, flexography, relief print, screen printing, rotogravure, and digital printing—greatly reduced the number of workers needed in the modern printshop and newspaper composing room.

In 1964, the ITU counted 121,858 members. But by 1980, the union had shed nearly a quarter of its membership due to technological advances. Toward the end of the ITU, the mailers outnumbered the printers. With the disappearance of linotype machines and the advent of paste makeup and computerized composition methods, the work in the composing rooms dropped. The mail rooms needed people to work on the inserting machines.

=== Merger ===
Concerned that the union did not have the economic strength to win good wages and benefits for its members and worried that further membership declines might threaten the viability of the union, the ITU leadership sought a merger with another printing union.

The ITU sought to merge with the Newspaper Guild but terminated negotiations in 1981 after nearly four years of talks. The ITU discussed merging with the Graphic Communications International Union, but the talks did not proceed very far. Later, the GCIU merged into the IBT.

Problems plagued the term of ITU President Joe Bingel (1978–1983). In a contested special election between Bingel and Robert McMichen, McMichen, the anti-Teamster candidate, won the election. However, the ITU was dying.

The ITU executive council subsequently required president Robert McMichen to enter into merger talks with the International Brotherhood of Teamsters. IBT President Jackie Presser spoke of merger with the ITU; at the 1983 San Francisco ITU convention. ITU President Joe Bingle risked his leadership post on the ITU–IBT merger and lost. However, the ITU's 74,000 members turned down the merger two-to-one in a vote taken in 1985, fearing that the Teamsters could not be trusted to respect the terms of the merger agreement—which included the hallmark of the ITU: autonomy. The Mailers would later join the Teamsters; the Printers would not. The last ITU convention was held in 1984 in Hershey, Pennsylvania. By 1986, the ITU had only 44,000 active members.

On December 31, 1986, the Associated Press printed the following with a dateline of Colorado Springs, Colorado:

The International Typographical Union has ceased to exist, and most of its staff was laid off at national headquarters here. Most of the 60 workers are continuing on a temporary basis with the Communication Workers of America, with which the ITU merged, said ITU spokesman Bill Frazee. The ITU ended operations on December 31, 1986. On January 1, 1987, the union joined the CWA as its Printing, Publishing and Media Workers Sector. CWA has its headquarters in Washington, D.C., and employees working for the sector will transfer there in two to four months, Frazee said. The International Typographical Union was the nation's oldest union, charted nationally in 1852. Its membership peaked in the 1960s at 100,000 printers. But since computerization of the business, membership has dropped to 40,000 working printers and 35,000 retirees.

Finally, in 1987, the printers of the ITU merged with the Communications Workers of America (CWA). It is now the Printing, Publishing, and Media Workers Sector of the CWA. Daniel F. Wasser is currently president of the sector.

The Mailers were split between the CWA and IBT. In May 1986, many Mailer locals joined "The Mailers' Conference of the CWA". When the ITU ended, some of the Mailer locals merged into the International Brotherhood of Teamsters (IBT). It is now the Newspaper, Magazine and Electronic Media Workers Division. Joe Molinero is the division director.

The ITU Fraternal Pension Fund was from 1908 to 1966. Elmer Brown created the Negotiated Pension Plan (NPP). Today, the pension for all ITU members before 1986 and CWA members since 1987 is the CWA/ITU Negotiated Pension Plan. This pension plan is located in Colorado Springs, Colorado. The Teamsters have the IBT Pension for members after 1987.

== Administration ==
=== Original chartered locals ===
On May 5, 1852:

- Indianapolis, #1
- Philadelphia, #2
- Cincinnati, #3
- Albany, #4
- Columbus, #5
- New York, #6
- Pittsburgh, #7
- St. Louis, #8
- Buffalo, #9
- Louisville, #10
- Memphis, #11
- Baltimore, #12
- Boston, #13
- Harrisburg, #14

Chartered later in 1852:

- Rochester, #15
- Chicago, #16
- New Orleans, #17
- Detroit, #18
- Elmira, #19
- Nashville, #20
- San Francisco, #21

A group of thirty men met to organize the Columbia Typographical Society in Washington, DC in December 1814. In 1867 they joined the newly-formed National Typographical Union (later, the International Typographical Union) as Columbia Typographical Union No. 101, representing workers at The Washington Post and Times-Herald, and Evening Star. Columbia Typographical Union/CWA No. 101 is now the oldest continuously existing labor union local in the United States.

The Typographical Journal records that in May 1892 there were 300 locals.

=== Office headquarters ===
At the Kansas City ITU convention of 1888, Indianapolis was selected as the official headquarters for the International Typographical Union. ITU President Edward T. Plank, declared, "In 1888 [...] all official (ITU) business, together with books, accounts and records shall be kept [...] at the City of Indianapolis, County of Marion, State of Indiana." During the 1927 ITU convention, at Indianapolis, ITU President Charles P. Howard showed delegates the Van Camp Mansion at Meridian and Twenty-Eighth Streets, which was to serve as the ITU headquarters.

The 1959 ITU convention at Philadelphia passed an action to move the ITU headquarters, after 73 years in Indianapolis, it was decided that the headquarters would be moved to Colorado Springs, Colorado. The building began in 1961, the new ITU Headquarters (225 S. Union Blvd.) and ITU Training Center (301 S. Union Blvd.) being located on the grounds of the Union Printers Home (101 S. Union Blvd.). The final move to Colorado Springs of President Elmer Brown and the Executive Council was completed in February 1963. The ITU Training Center, which opened on May 5, 1962, would publish The Typographical Journal, The ITU Bulletin, and The ITU Review. The former two were the oldest trade union organs founded in 1889.

=== Union Printers Home ===
In 1889, Colorado Springs, Colorado was chosen as the site of Union Printers Home. George W. Childs, publisher of the Philadelphia Public Ledger and his philanthropist friend Anthony J. Drexel gave a gift of $10,000 in 1886 to start work toward the Home, thus starting a fund which grew. The 1890 ITU convention in Atlanta approved of the Home.

On May 12, 1892, the Childs–Drexel Home for Union Printers opened on 29 acres (120,000 m^{2}) located on the corner of Pikes Peak Ave. and S. Union Blvd. "A Home for the Aged and Sanatorium for Tuberculars. Maintained by the International Typographical Union for Its Distressed Members." 19th Century printers suffered from tuberculosis, and the clean air of the Rocky Mountains, Pikes Peak area in Colorado was seen as a location to clean the diseased lungs. The home was open only to members of the ITU; members' wives or widows were not admitted. John D. Vaughn served as first Superintendent of the Home while its first member was W. B. Eckert, a retired member and former officer of the Philadelphia #2 local. The 1899 ITU convention at Detroit approved the name Union Printers Home. The home, a hospital and sanatorium, was staffed by its own doctors, nurses and other medical technicians. The lands of the home grew to 260 acres (1.1 km^{2}) to accommodate a dairy, farms, gardens, power plant, and workshops to help make the UPH self-sufficient. In 1944, Dowell Patterson (1899–1968), superintendent of the home, saw that the most modern of medical equipment was furnished to the UPH. In later years, the tubercular sanitoriums were razed. Today the home serves the people of Colorado Springs and El Paso County as a health care facility with assisted living and nursing care. The main building is a State of Colorado historical site. In February 2020, the local press and media reported the State of Colorado had shut down the facility, citing numerous violations. In July 2021, a small group of investors are planning to refurbish the UPH over the next five years and turn it into a public space.

=== Women's International Auxiliary ===
The Women's International Auxiliary was formed at the 1902 Cincinnati ITU Convention. The WIA slogan was Spend Union Earned Money for Union Label Products and Union Services and its quarterly publication was Label Facts. The WIA contributed to the Union Printers Home Fund with various fund raising events. At each ITU convention the WIA would award prizes for the, Union Label Poster contest. Only printer wives were eligible to be elected to the WIA local and international offices. After 1948, mailers' wives were only eligible to serve the local and international WIA auxiliary as third vice president.

The Women's International Auxiliary of the International Typographical Union ceased to exist after 1990, which was after the dissolution of the parent union.

=== Allied Printing Trades Association ===
In March 1911, five international unions created the Allied Printing Trades Association:

- International Typographical Union
- International Printing Pressmen Union of North America
- Bookbinders
- Photo Engravers
- Stereotypers and Electrotypers Unions

In 1955, there was a new agreement, and the following unions were included in the association:

- United Papermakers and Paperworkers
- The Newspaper Guild
- International Brotherhood of Pulp, Sulphite and Paper Mill Workers
- The Plate Printers
- Die Stampers and Engravers

The Mailer unions chartered by the ITU were eligible for membership in Allied Printing Trades Councils. The International Mailers Union was refused membership.

=== Mailers ===
Nearly 100 Mailer Locals would be chartered under the ITU. To mark the difference between the Printers and Mailers Unions, the ITU used the M before the local number. In New York City, Typographical #6 and Mailers, M-6. The position of the mailers was that of second-class citizens in the ITU, with no voice on the executive council. Mailers Cary Weaver and Munro Roberts felt the needs of mailers fell on deaf printer ears on the ITU executive council.

The Mailers Trade District Union (MTDU) was an internal part of the ITU. Lawsuits from 1926–1944 were fought for mailer rights. The MTDU was eventually abolished by court injunction and referendum vote. In 1929, ITU president Charles P. Howard selected third vice-president C. N. Smith (a printer) to represent the MTDU. The mailers were allowed to vote in 1930 for their MTDU representative; John Mc Ardle and Harold Mitchell served in 1934. Munro Roberts was elected as MTDU member of the executive council, (1935–1937) but he had no voice or vote. After many heated arguments with ITU President Howard and Secretary Randolph, Roberts became committed to a separate mailer union. Moreover, the International Mailers' Union (IMU), was created and many shops would have two boards, ITU and IMU. With the departure of Roberts, Thomas J. Martin represented the MTDU (1938–1944). The MTDU continued by court order; however, the mailers were again without an observer to the executive council. The 1947 Cleveland convention paved the way for the demise of the MTDU and the election of a mailer to the executive council. Joe Bailey (San Francisco–Oakland Mailers #M-18), was elected third vice-president before the 1948 Milwaukee convention. ITU President Woodruff Randolph saw a way to appease mailers returning after service in World War II. The agreement made between ITU President Randolph and Joe Bailey: only a Printer would ever be president, first and second Vice-President or Secretary-Treasurer of the ITU. The position of third Vice-President would be held only by a Mailer. The IMU lost much power to draw new membership. The IMU finally was finally fully merged into the ITU only in 1982, only five years before the union's demise. Joe Bailey served on the ITU executive council until 1973. A mailer would remain ITU third vice-president: Robert F. Ameln, (1974–1975) and the Canadian mailer, Allen J. Heritage, (1976–1986).

== Leadership ==
=== Presidents ===
1852: John S. Nafew
1853: Gerard Stith
1854: Lewis Graham
1855: Charles F. Town
1856: M. C. Brown
1857: William Cuddy
1858: Robert C. Smith
1860: John McCreath Farquhar
1863: Eugene Vallette
1864: A. M. Carver
1865: Robert E. Craig
1866: John H. Oberly
1868: Robert McKechnie
1869: Isaac D. George
1870: William J. Hammond
1873: W. R. McLean
1874: William H. Bodwell
1875: Walter W. Bell
1876: John McVicar
1877: Darwin R. Streeter
1878: John Armstrong
1879: Samuel Haldeman
1880: William P. Atkinson
1881: George Clark
1883: Mark L. Crawford
1884: M. R. H. Witter
1886: William Aimison
1888: Edward T. Plank
1891: William B. Prescott
1898: Samuel B. Donnelly
1900: James M. Lynch
1914: James M. Duncan
1915: M. G. Scott
1921: John McParland
1923: Charles P. Howard
1924: James M. Lynch
1926: Charles P. Howard
1938: Claude M. Baker
1944: Woodruff Randolph
1957: Elmer Brown
1968: John J. Pilch
1974: Sandy Bevis
1978: Joe Bingel
1984: Robert McMichen

=== Secretary-Treasurers ===
1854: H. H. Whitcomb
1857: Lewis Graham
1858: George W. Smith
1859: Thomas J. Walsh
1864: William F. Moore
1866: Alexander Troup
1868: John Collins
1874: W. A. Hutchinson
1877: John H. O'Donnell
1878: William White
1880: William H. Trayes
1882: Mark L. Crawford
1883: William Briggs
1885: E. S. McIntosh
1886: D. M. Pascoe
1887: William S. McClevey
1893: A. G. Wines
1896: John W. Bramwood
1909: John W. Hays
1929: Woodruff Randolph
1944: Jack Gill
1947: Don Hurd
1959: William R. Cloud
1974/5: Thomas Kopeck

== See also ==
- United States labor law
- United Kingdom labour law
- List of labor unions in the United States

== General Reference ==
- International Typographical Union Collection, 1870-1936. M.E. Grenander Department of Special Collections and Archives, University Libraries, University at Albany, State University of New York (hereafter referred to as the ITU Collection).

=== Bibliography ===
==== Literature ====
- The Executive Council International Typographical Union, A Study of the History of the International Typographical Union, 1852–1963. Volumes I & II . Colorado Springs, CO: International Typographical Union, 1964.
- The Executive Council International Typographical Union, Facts About The International Typographical Union For All Who Would Like To Know ! Colorado Springs, Colorado: The ITU Executive Council, 1965.
- Ethelbert, Stewart. Early Organization of Printers. Washington: Bulletin of the Bureau of Labor - No. 61. November, 1905.
- Seymour Martin Lipset. Union Democracy: The Internal Politics of the International Typographical Union. Glencoe, Illinois: Free Press, 1956. ISBN 0-02-919210-2
- Loft, Jacob. The Printing Trades. Farrar & Rinehart, 1944.
- Munson, Fred. Labor Relations in the Lithographic Industry. Boston: Harvard University Press, 1963. ISBN 0-674-50850-5
- Stevens, George. History of Typographical Union No. 6. Albany: New York Commissioner of Labor, 1911.
- Tracy, George A. History of the Typographical Union. Indianapolis: International Typographical Union, 1913.
