= Wainuiomata Water Collection Area =

Park in New Zealand

- Interactive map of Wainuiomata Water Collection Area
- Type: Reserve
- Location: Lower Hutt, Wellington Region, New Zealand
- Coordinates: 41°15′45″S 175°00′36″E
- Operator: Wellington Regional Council
- Status: Closed to public

Wainuiomata Water Collection Area is a reserve located near Wainuiomata, Lower Hutt in the Wellington Region at the southern end of New Zealand's North Island. It is administered by Wellington Regional Council, for exclusive use by Wellington Water as a water catchment reserve. The park covers the catchments of the Wainuiomata River and the Ōrongorongo River. It adjoins Remutaka Forest Park and Wainuiomata Regional Park.

In 2022, a study commissioned by Wellington Regional Council and conducted by Jim Lynch, the founder of Zealandia, found that establishing a wildlife sanctuary in the water catchment area was "technically and practically feasible". The name given to the proposed sanctuary is Puketahā.

== Geography ==
The area consists of lush native forests and clear rivers, which have remained largely untouched. It has been described as "largest and most pristine lowland forest in the lower North Island".

Southern rata trees tower over a canopy of hinau, kamahi, rewarewa and tree ferns. There are also black beech trees on drier sites and silver beech trees on high ridge-tops.

North Island robins are being re-introduced, and some North Island brown kiwi have migrated to the park from the nearby Remutaka Forest Park.

The council has been working to protect plant, fish, insect and bird species, by intensively controlling possums, rats, stoats, deer, pigs and goats. Regular records are made of vegetation recovery, animal numbers and native bird populations.

== History ==
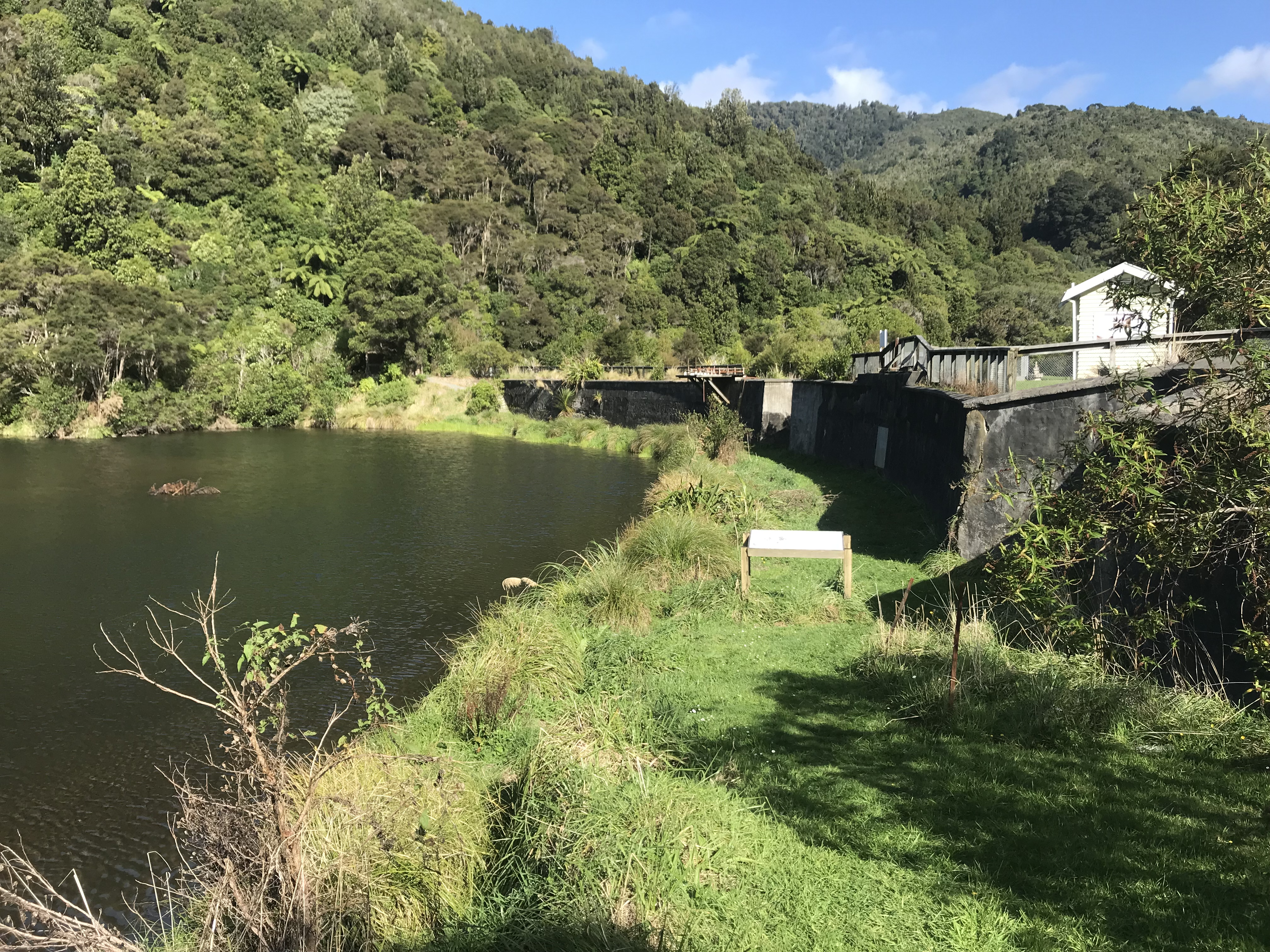
Historic Lower Dam on the Wainuiomata River

European settlers recognised the value of the area as a water source in the 19th century. An earth dam was constructed in 1880, and a pipeline was laid to Wellington. This complemented the country's first public water supply dam, completed in Karori west of the city two years earlier.

The Morton Dam was constructed between 1908 and 1911. A weir and pipeline from the Ōrongorongo Catchment was built in 1924.

The original system was decommissioned and emptied in the late 1980s, and a new treatment plant was built which takes water direct from weirs in both river catchments. The new plant produces up to 60 million litres per day, supplying about 15 percent of the water used in the Wellington urban area.

The re-introduction of kiwi into the nearby Remutaka Forest Park, beginning in May 2006, led to some kiwi migration to the collection area. The re-introduction of North Island robins to the park began in September 2016.

Pest control was carried out in the park in October 2019, including the use of 1080 to reduce rat numbers.

In May 2025, a wild population of the nationally vulnerable parasitic flowering plant Dactylanthus taylorii was discovered in the Wainuiomata Water Collection Area . The species had been thought to be extinct in the Wellington Region for over a century. A management plan will be prepared to assist in preserving this wild population.

== Recreation ==
Public access to the park is restricted to protect the native bush and water catchments. There are some guided tours of the park, but visitors must have the permission of Wellington Regional Council or Wellington Water.

Hunting ballots are issued for land blocks, with hunting permitted between 5.30am and dusk on a group of specified dates. Five of the 10 available hunting blocks require a four-wheel drive vehicle to access.

Fireworks are banned at all times.

== Proposed wildlife sanctuary ==
In 2022, a study commissioned by Wellington Regional Council and conducted by Jim Lynch, the founder of Zealandia, found that establishing a fenced wildlife sanctuary in the water catchment area was "technically and practically feasible". The name given to the proposed sanctuary is Puketahā.
