= International Printing Pressmen and Assistants' Union of North America =

Trade union

- Abbreviation: IPPU
- Predecessor: International Typographical Union
- Merged into: International Printing and Graphic Communications Union
- Formation: 1889
- Dissolved: 1973
- Type: Trade union
- Headquarters: Pressmen's Home, Tennessee, US; Washington, DC, US
- Locations: Canada; United States
- Affiliations: AFL–CIO
- Formerly called: International Printing Pressmen's Union of North America

The International Printing Pressmen and Assistants' Union of North America (IPPU) was a labor union representing printing workers in the United States and Canada.

== History ==
An article in the San Francisco Chronicle detailing plans for the IPPU's 17th annual convention in that city, featuring former president Theo F. Galoskowsky, current president Martin P. Higgins, and local secretary James H. Roxburgh, June 17, 1905

The union was founded on 8 October 1889, as the International Printing Pressmen's Union of North America, a split from the International Typographical Union (ITU). By 1894, it had grown sufficiently that the ITU agreed to give the new union jurisdiction over pressroom workers, and to transfer its remaining members in the field. On 3 November 1895, the union was chartered by the American Federation of Labor. The union began accepting press feeders into membership, and in 1897, it adopted its final name.

In 1911, the union constructed its headquarters at Pressmen's Home, Tennessee, the site selected to also house a union-owned sanatorium and trade school. The trade school taught letterpress, but mostly focused on retraining workers in offset printing.

By 1926, the union had 45,000 members. It affiliated to the AFL–CIO from 1955, and by 1957, its membership had grown to 104,000. At its peak, the union was the largest printers' union in the world.

The union closed its sanatorium in 1961, and closed its school in 1966, when it moved its headquarters to Washington, DC. In 1973, the union merged with the International Stereotypers' and Electrotypers' Union, to form the International Printing and Graphic Communications Union.

== Presidents ==
1889: Thomas F. Mahoney
1890: C. W. Miller
1892: Theo F. Galoskowsky
1897: Jesse Johnson
1898: James H. Bowman
1901: Martin P. Higgins
1907: George L. Berry
1948: Julius de la Rosa
1952: Thomas Dunwoody
1959: Anthony DeAndrade
1970: Alexander Rohan
