= International Printing and Graphic Communications Union =

North American trade union

- Abbreviation: IPGCU
- Merged into: Graphic Communications International Union
- Formation: 1973
- Dissolved: 1983
- Merger of: International Printing Pressmen and Assistants' Union of North America; International Stereotypers' and Electrotypers' Union
- Type: Trade union
- Locations: Canada; United States
- Presidents: Alexander Rohan; Sol Fishko
- Affiliations: AFL–CIO; Canadian Labour Congress

The International Printing and Graphic Communications Union (IPGCU) was a labor union representing printing workers in the United States and Canada.

The union was established on 1 October 1973, when the International Printing Pressmen and Assistants' Union of North America merged with the International Stereotypers' and Electrotypers' Union. Like both its predecessors, it affiliated to the AFL–CIO.

On formation, the union had 105,000 members, but this figure steadily fell, and by 1981, membership was down to 93,000. On 25 May 1983, the union merged with the Graphic Arts International Union, to form the Graphic Communications International Union.

== Presidents ==
1973: Alexander Rohan
1974: Sol Fishko
