= James Lynch (criminologist) =

American criminologist (born 1949)

- Born: 1949 (age 76–77); Hartford, Connecticut
- Education: Wesleyan University; University of Chicago
- Known for: Crime statistics Social control
- Scientific career
- Fields: Criminology
- Workplaces: American University; John Jay College of Criminal Justice; Bureau of Justice Statistics; University of Maryland

James Patrick Lynch (born 1949 in Hartford, Connecticut) is an American criminologist and professor in the Department of Criminology and Criminal Justice at the University of Maryland.

== Education ==
Lynch graduated from Northwest Catholic High School in West Hartford, Connecticut in 1967, after which he received his bachelor's degree in sociology from Wesleyan University in 1971. He later received a masters' and Ph.D. in sociology from the University of Chicago in 1975 and 1983, respectively.

== Career ==
Lynch joined the faculty of the Department of Justice, Law, and Society at American University in 1986, where he eventually became Department Chair in 2003. He left American University's faculty for the John Jay College of Criminal Justice in 2005. In June 2010, while on leave from John Jay, he was confirmed by the United States Senate as director of the Bureau of Justice Statistics (BJS). In January 2013, he left the BJS to join the faculty of the University of Maryland as head of their Department of Criminology and Criminal Justice. He served as president of the American Society of Criminology in 2017.

== Research ==
Lynch's research focuses on criminal victimization, crime statistics, and social control, among other topics. This has included work on both the National Crime Survey, which he helped redesign from 1980 to 1985, and the Uniform Crime Reports.

== Editorial activities ==
Lynch was the co-editor-in-chief of the Journal of Quantitative Criminology from 2008 to 2010.

Professional and academic associations
Preceded by Ruth D. Peterson	President of the American Society of Criminology; 2017	Succeeded by Karen Heimer
