= Jim Lynch (Australian footballer) =

Australian rules footballer

Personal information
- Full name: James Lynch
- Born: 25 October 1883
- Died: 15 June 1919 (aged 35); Stockton, New South Wales
- Original team: Collingwood Trades
- Height: 174 cm (5 ft 9 in)

Playing career^{1}
Years	Club	Games (Goals)
1909	Fitzroy	8 (0)
1910	South Melbourne	1 (0)
Total		9 (0)
- ^{1} Playing statistics correct to the end of 1910.

Jim Lynch (25 October 1883 – 15 June 1919) was an Australian rules footballer who played with Fitzroy and South Melbourne in the Victorian Football League (VFL).

== Family ==
He married Jessie McWilliam in 1914.

== Football ==
=== Fitzroy (VFL) ===
Recruited by Fitzroy from the Collingwood Trades Football Club in 1909, as a wing and rover — he had been the captain of Collingwood Trades in 1908.

=== South Melbourne (VFL) ===
He was cleared from Fitzroy to South Melbourne on 4 May 1910.

== Death ==
He died of "pneumonic influenza" at Stockton, New South Wales on 15 June 1919.
