= James M. Lynch =

American labor union leader (1867–1930)

James Mathew Lynch (January 11, 1867 – July 16, 1930) was an American labor union leader.

Born in Manlius, New York, to James Lynch and Sarah Caulfield, Lynch began working as a printers' assistant on the Syracuse Evening Herald, becoming a press feeder and then completing an apprenticeship as a compositor. In 1887, he joined the International Typographical Union (ITU), becoming successively secretary, vice-president and president of his union local. He also served two terms as president of the Syracuse Central Trades and Labor Assembly.

In 1898, Lynch was elected as vice-president of the ITU, and then in 1900 as president. While in the post, he led a successful campaign for a 48-hour working week, established a pension scheme for members, reformed the apprenticeship scheme, and doubled the union's membership.

In 1914, Lynch was appointed as New York Commissioner of Labor. Soon after, this was merged into a new Industrial Commission, with Lynch serving as one of five commissioners until 1921. He then became the president of the American Life Society, an insurance company, but in 1924 was re-elected as president of the ITU. He was defeated for re-election in 1926, and from 1927 suffered from ongoing blood poisoning.

In 1929, Lynch was appointed by Governor Franklin D. Roosevelt to the New York Old Age Security Commission. The following year, he also became editor of the Advocate, a labor movement newspaper based in Syracuse. He died, of an infection, in July 1930.

Trade union offices
Preceded by Samuel B. Donnelly	President of the International Typographical Union; 1900–1914	Succeeded by James M. Duncan
Preceded by Charles P. Howard	President of the International Typographical Union; 1924–1926	Succeeded by Charles P. Howard
Political offices
Preceded by John Williams	New York Commissioner of Labor; 1913–1915	Succeeded by John Mitchell
