= International Brotherhood of Bookbinders =

North American trade union

The International Brotherhood of Bookbinders (IBB) was a labor union representing bookbinding workers in the United States and Canada.

The union was founded on May 5, 1892, as a split from the International Typographical Union. In 1898, it received a charter from the American Federation of Labor. In 1908, it had an annual convention in Cincinnati to go over the question of eight hour workdays that had been going on throughout the country. In 1919 it absorbed the small International Brotherhood of Tip Printers. By 1926, the union had 14,000 members.

The union was affiliated to the AFL–CIO from 1955, and by 1957, its membership had grown to 58,344. On September 4, 1972, it merged with the Lithographers' and Photoengravers' International Union, to form the Graphic Arts International Union.

== Presidents ==
1892: William B. Hyde
1895:
1905: Robert Glockling
1913: A. P. Sovey
1918: Walter N. Reddick
1926: William Glockling
1926: John B. Haggerty
1953: Robert E. Haskin
1959: Joseph Denny
1963: John Connolly
