= Lithographers' and Photoengravers' International Union =

North American labor union

The Lithographers' and Photoengravers' International Union (LPIU) was a labor union representing printing workers in the United States and Canada.

The union was founded on September 7, 1964, when the Amalgamated Lithographers of America merged with the International Photo-Engravers Union of North America. Like the Photo-Engravers, it was chartered by the AFL–CIO. On September 4, 1972, the union merged with the International Brotherhood of Bookbinders, to form the Graphic Arts International Union.

On formation, the union had 50,000 members. Throughout its existence, the union was led by president Kenneth J. Brown.
