= Jim Lynch (conservationist) =

New Zealand cartoonist and conservationist

Jim Lynch QSM
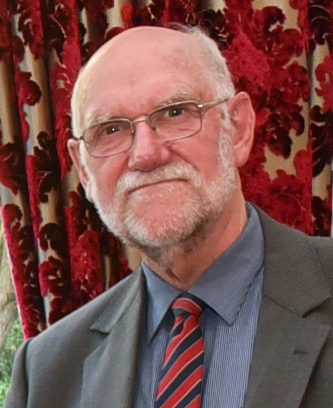
- Lynch in 2020
- Born: James Robert Lynch; 11 September 1947 (age 79); Whangārei, New Zealand
- Occupations: Cartoonist; conservationist
- Known for: Founder of Zealandia

James Robert Lynch QSM (born 11 September 1947) is a New Zealand cartoonist and conservationist. Lynch is best known as the founder of eco-sanctuary Zealandia in Wellington.

In 1990, Lynch was a key contributor to a plan to restore the biodiversity of Wellington City, on behalf of the Wellington Branch of Forest & Bird. The plan, called Natural Wellington, identified multiple sites in Wellington City that could be restored and developed to enhance biodiversity. One of these sites was the former Karori water supply reservoir, which still had the status of a water catchment reserve.

In 1992, Lynch set out a proposal to Wellington City Council and the Greater Wellington Regional Council that the Karori site should become a "mainland island" for the protection of threatened native species. The site would require a pest-exclusion fence and environmental restoration, with community ownership and engagement. A feasibility study was undertaken in 1993, and the Karori Sanctuary Trust was formed in 1995 to implement the plan. A new design of pest-exclusion fence was developed for the site and completed in 1999, leading to the sanctuary becoming the first mainland pest-fenced eco-sanctuary in New Zealand. Lynch was the deputy chairman of the Karori Sanctuary Trust from its establishment in 1995 until his retirement in 2007. The Karori sanctuary was re-branded as Zealandia in 2008.

== Personal life ==
Lynch was born in 1947 in Whangārei. He grew up on a farm in Hūkerenui. He now lives in Waikanae.

== Cartooning ==
His first cartoons were published in the Taranaki Daily News in 1980 (appearing weekly until 1986) and he produced fortnightly cartoons for the New Zealand Times from 1981 to 1985. He was the runner-up in the New Zealand Cartoonist of the Year category at the Qantas Press Awards in 1982. Lynch's cartoons appeared under the name 'James' because "I didn't want to go to my boss and ask if I could have secondary employment as a political cartoonist". In 2012 his work was archived in the Alexander Turnbull Library.

== Natural Wellington ==
Lynch was the president of the Wellington Branch of Forest and Bird from 1991 to 1993. In 1991, Lynch was commissioned by Forest and Bird to prepare a plan to restore the biodiversity of Wellington City. The plan, called Natural Wellington, introduced the idea of urban conservation, identified 36 important conservation sites in the city, advocated for their preservation and protection and for the adoption of city-wide restoration planting and pest control. The theme of the plan was to "bring the birds back to Wellington City". The plan was endorsed by the Wellington City Council (WCC) who instigated a land purchase and allocation programme and pest control in key sites.

Natural Wellington led to the establishment of Zealandia and was the precursor to the transformation of Wellington into a 'biophilic city'. The key goals in Natural Wellington, including to bring back the birds, have now been achieved (as confirmed by the WCC monitoring programme).

== Zealandia ==
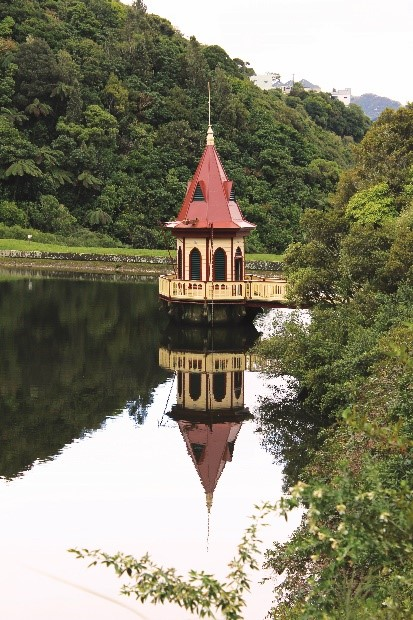
Zealandia Valve Tower

During the Natural Wellington survey, Lynch identified the 252 hectares (620 acres) former Karori water supply reservoir as a key site due to its location, potential and size. In 1992, building on the concept of the "mainland island", Lynch proposed to the WCC and Greater Wellington Regional Council, that the site be fenced to exclude all exotic mammalian pests and become a secure sanctuary for threatened native wildlife, to be managed in perpetuity by a community trust. The proposal had several novel aspects, including pest exclusion fencing, ecosystem restoration, urban conservation, community ownership and involvement, public education and enjoyment, and financial sustainability. The idea was to bring the offshore island experience into the city. The sanctuary was also intended to act as a "nursery" to repopulate the surrounding city environs, an effect described by Lynch as the "nursery and halo" model. Known initially as Karori Sanctuary, a feasibility study was undertaken in 1993, public consultation conducted in 1994, and the trust was formed in 1995.

A new design of pest-exclusion fence was developed for the site and tested for its effectiveness against a range of target animals. The 8.6 km pest exclusion fence was built in 1999, and within six months twelve pest mammal species were removed from the 225 ha enclosed area in a groundbreaking exercise. The sanctuary was rebranded as Zealandia in 2008. Seventeen missing fauna species have been re-established in the managed area; including seven which had formerly existed only on offshore islands (little spotted kiwi, North Island saddleback, hihi, red-crowned parakeet, tuatara, Hamilton's frog, and Cook Strait giant wētā). In 2018, after a twenty-year independent monitoring programme, the Ornithological Society of New Zealand reported that the birdlife in the sanctuary had increased beyond expectations and that the diversity and abundance of birdlife was tracking towards matching that of Kapiti Island. It has also been successful in attracting members, volunteers and visitors and now puts up to $30 million per annum into the Wellington economy.

Zealandia has been credited with being the key element in the transformation of Wellington's biodiversity and its status as a biophilic city.

Lynch chaired the Karori Sanctuary steering committee, managed the feasibility study for the project and was appointed Deputy Chairman of the trust when it was formed in 1995; a post he held for twelve years when he retired and became the Founder Vice-Patron of the trust. He authored its key founding documents including the trust deed, the Strategic Business Plan and the Restoration Plan.

In 2019 he authored a book about the enterprise; Zealandia the valley that changed a nation.

== Wainuiomata/Puketahā Sanctuary proposal ==
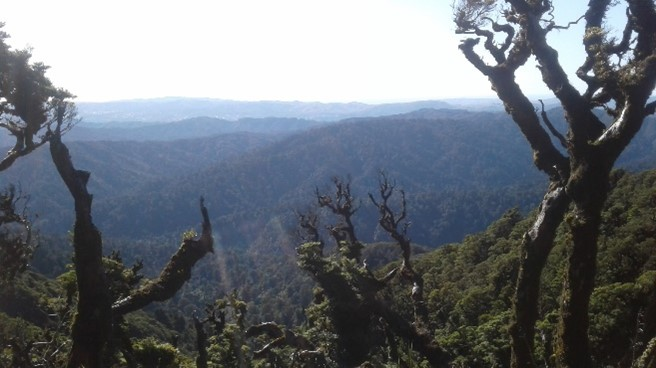
Wainuiomata Water Catchment

In 2020 Lynch proposed that the headwaters of the Wainuiomata River catchment constituting 3,313 ha of the Wainuiomata Water Collection Area be pest exclusion fenced and managed as a secure eco-sanctuary for threatened species and to act as nursery to repopulate the surrounding Remutaka Range with indigenous fauna. The flagship species for reintroduction were proposed as kākāpō, hihi and kiwi. The proposal has received support from the Department of Conservation, Wellington Regional Council and Taranaki Whānui as mana whenua. In 2022, Lynch was commissioned by Wellington Regional Council and the Department of Conservation to manage a feasibility study for the proposal. The study found that the project was "technically and practically feasible". The name given to the proposed sanctuary is Puketahā.

== National impact ==
Lynch's major contribution to conservation has been the pest-exclusion fence. Pest exclusion fencing was not new in New Zealand at the time but was limited to single species and small scale. Lynch (see the1992 Karori Sanctuary proposal) conceived a fence designed to exclude all mammals (multi species) and to operate at a large scale (the Karori design is now employed at up to 3,000-ha). The Karori fence was built in August 1999 and was the first of its type. Landcare now identify over 30 projects using pest exclusion fencing based on the Karori model. This fence design allowed the return to the mainland of at least nine species which were formerly restricted to offshore islands (kākāpō, little spotted kiwi, North and South Island saddleback, hihi, tuatara, Hamiltons frog, giant wētā). It was also the key technology which enabled the community eco-sanctuary.

Lynch's design of the Zealandia eco-sanctuary concept and its business model was widely copied across New Zealand in subsequent years. Zealandia inspired a national community sanctuary movement which now encompasses over 30 fenced sanctuaries and protects approximately 44,000 ha of high value mostly lowland ecosystems. The largest of the fenced sanctuaries is Maungatautari near Cambridge (3,200 ha) where the fence was built in 2006. Other projects took inspiration from these sanctuaries in a cascading effect. The community conservation sector has been arguably the largest growth segment in New Zealand conservation over the last 20 years.

In 2012, Sir Paul Callaghan inspired by the Zealandia model, launched the idea of "Predator Free NZ" in a speech at Victoria University sponsored by Zealandia.

== Honours and awards ==
In 1982. Runner up. Cartoonist section. Qantas Press Awards.

In 1993. NZATD "Outstanding Instructional Product" award.

In 1997. Wellington Civic Award for Natural Wellington.

In 2000. Community Services Finalist "Wellingtonian of the year".

In 2000. "Absolutely Positively Wellington" (APW) Award for Zealandia.

In 2001 Queen's Birthday Honours, Lynch was awarded the Queen's Service Medal for community service.

In 2022. Medallist Kiwibank Local Hero of the year awards.

== Publications ==
- Lynch, James (2015). "Drawing the Days of Blunder and Lightning". Steele Roberts. ISBN 9781927242766.
- Lynch, Jim (2019). Zealandia: the valley that changed a nation. Waikanae: Kotare Publications. ISBN 978-0-473-49011-9.
