= Graphic Arts International Union =

North American trade union

- Abbreviation: GAIU
- Merged into: Graphic Communications International Union
- Formation: 1972
- Dissolved: 1983
- Merger of: International Brotherhood of Bookbinders; Lithographers' and Photoengravers' International Union
- Type: Trade union
- Headquarters: Washington, DC, US
- Locations: Canada; United States
- Members: 115,000 (1981)
- President: Kenneth J. Brown
- Affiliations: AFL–CIO; Canadian Labour Congress

The Graphic Arts International Union (GAIU) was a labor union representing printing workers in the United States and Canada.

The union was founded on September 4, 1972, when the International Brotherhood of Bookbinders merged with the Lithographers' and Photoengravers' International Union. Like both its predecessors, it affiliated to the AFL–CIO.

By 1981, the union had 115,000 members. On May 25, 1983, it merged with the International Printing and Graphic Communications Union, to form the Graphic Communications International Union.

Throughout its existence, the union was led by president Kenneth J. Brown.
