= Graphic Communications International Union =

North American trade union

- Abbreviation: GCIU
- Successor: Communications, Energy and Paperworkers Union of Canada; International Brotherhood of Teamsters (Graphic Communications Conference)
- Formation: 1983
- Dissolved: 2005
- Merger of: Graphic Arts International Union; International Printing and Graphic Communications Union
- Type: Trade union
- Headquarters: Washington, DC, US
- Locations: Canada; United States
- Members: 60,000–154,000
- Presidents: Kenneth J. Brown; James J. Norton; George Tedeschi
- Affiliations: AFL–CIO; Canadian Labour Congress
- Website: gciu.org

The Graphic Communications International Union (GCIU) was a labor union representing printing workers in the United States and Canada.

The union was founded on May 25, 1983, when the Graphic Arts International Union merged with the International Printing and Graphic Communications Union. Like both its predecessors, it affiliated to the AFL–CIO. On formation, it had 154,000 members. This figure fell rapidly, along with employment in the industry, and by 2004, the union had only 60,000 members.

On January 1, 2005, American and Quebecois members merged into the International Brotherhood of Teamsters, becoming its Graphic Communications Conference. The rest of Canadian members from the other provinces became part of the Communications, Energy and Paperworkers Union of Canada.

== Presidents ==
1983: Kenneth J. Brown
1985: James J. Norton
2000: George Tedeschi

== General Reference ==
- Graphic Communications International Union Local 10-b, of Albany, New York, Records, 1892–1989. M.E. Grenander Department of Special Collections and Archives, University Libraries, University at Albany, State University of New York (hereafter referred to as the GCIU, Local 10-b, Records).
- Graphic Communications International Union, Local 259-M Records, 1941–1988. M.E. Grenander Department of Special Collections and Archives, University Libraries, University at Albany, State University of New York (hereafter referred to as the GCIU, Local 259-M, Records).
