= 2009 AFL–CIO election =

Trade union election

The 2009 election for the leadership of the AFL–CIO occurred following the announcement of incumbent president John Sweeney's retirement. The election took place during the 26th AFL–CIO National Convention in Pittsburgh.

The event was preceded by a 2008 speech at which then-Secretary-Treasurer Richard Trumka had blasted the perceived racism being directed against 2008 Democratic presidential candidate Barack Obama, increasing his profile both inside and outside the labor movement. Trumka, who had served as Secretary-Treasurer since first being elected in 1995, received no contest for the position of president.

== Candidates ==
Note: Winning candidates are in bold.
President

- **Richard Trumka**

Secretary-Treasurer

- **Liz Shuler**
- Gregory Junemann

Executive Vice-President

- **Arlene Holt Baker**

=== Other electees ===
The total number of vice-presidents of the federation was expanded from 43 (including the Executive Vice-President) to 51.

The following were elected to other vice-presidencies besides the Executive Vice-Presidency:

- Patrick D. Finley, Plasterers and Cement Masons (OP&CMIA)
- Mike Futhey, United Transportation Union (UTU)
- Newton Jones, Boilermakers (IBB)
- D. Michael Langford, Utility Workers (UWUA)
- Robert McEllrath, International Longshore and Warehouse Union (ILWU)
- Roberta Reardon, American Federation of Television and Radio Artists (AFTRA)
- John Ryan, Glass, Molders, Pottery, Plastics and Allied Works (GMP)
- DeMaurice Smith, Professional Athletes
- Baldemar Velasquez, Farm Labor Organizing Committee (FLOC)
- James Andrews, NC State AFL–CIO
- Mark Ayers, Building and Construction Trades Department
- James Boland, Bricklayers
- R. Thomas Buffenbarger, Machinists
- Larry Cohen, Communications Workers of America
- RoseAnn DeMoro, National Nurses United
- Maria Elena Durazo, LA County AFL–CIO
- Roy Flores, AFGE
- John Gage, AFGE
- Leo W. Gerard, United Steelworkers
- Vincent Giblin, Operating Engineers
- Michael Goodwin, Office and Professional Employees
- Edwin D. Hill, Electrical Workers
- William Hite, Plumbers and Pipe Fitters
- General Holiefield, AW
- Ken Howard, Screen Actors
- Richard Hughes, Longshoremen
- Frank Hurt, Bakery, Confectionery, Tobacco Workers and Grain Millers
- Lorretta Johnson, AFT
- Gregory Junemann, International Federation of Professional and Technical Engineers
- Bob King, UAW
- James Little, Transport Workers
- Matthew Loeb, Theatrical Stage Employees
- William Lucy, Postal Workers
- Gerald W. McEntee, AFSCME
- Capt. Lee Moak, Air Line Pilots
- Joseph J. Nigro, Sheet Metal Workers
- Terry O'Sullivan, LIUNA
- Fred Redmond, United Steelworkers
- Clyde Rivers, California School Employees Association
- Cecil Roberts, Mine Workers
- Fredric Rolando, Letter Carriers
- Michael Sacco, Seafarers
- Lee Saunders, AFSCME
- Robert A. Scardelletti, Transportation Communications Union
- Harold A. Schaitberger, Fire Fighters
- Veda Shook, Flight Attendants-CWA
- Bruce Smith, Glass, Molders, Pottery, Plastics and Allied Workers
- Robbie Sparks, IBEW
- Randi Weingarten, AFT
- John Wilhelm, UNITEHERE!
- James Williams, Painters and Allied Trades
- Walter Wise, Ironworkers
- Nancy Wohlforth, OPEIU
- Diann Woodard, School Administrators
