= Thomas R. Donahue =

American labor leader (1928–2023)

3rd President of the AFL–CIO
- In office August 1995 – October 1995
- Preceded by: Lane Kirkland
- Succeeded by: John Sweeney

3rd Secretary-Treasurer of the AFL–CIO
- In office 1979–1995
- Preceded by: Lane Kirkland
- Succeeded by: Barbara Easterling

Personal details
- Born: Thomas Reilly Donahue Jr. September 4, 1928 New York City, New York, U.S.
- Died: February 18, 2023 (aged 94) Washington, D.C., U.S.
- Spouses: Natalie Kiernan (m. 1950; div. 1975); Rachelle Horowitz (m. 1979)
- Children: 2
- Education: Manhattan College; Fordham University School of Law
- Occupation: Labor leader

Thomas Reilly Donahue Jr. (September 4, 1928 – February 18, 2023) was an American trade union leader who served as Secretary-Treasurer of the American Federation of Labor and Congress of Industrial Organizations from 1979 to 1995, interim president for several months in 1995, and was President Emeritus from 1996 until his death. He was considered as one of the most influential leaders of the post-World War II American trade union movement.

== Early life ==
Born and raised in the Bronx in New York City, Donahue was the son of Thomas R. and Mary E. Donahue and was the grandson of Irish immigrants. According to The New York Times, he "came of age at a time when unions were helping deliver New Yorkers from the Depression and were perceived as a beacon for many young people."

Donahue was first drawn to the trade union movement after he saw how much his father's wages increased when he went from working as a nonunion janitor to a unionized construction worker. The younger Donahue worked as a Best & Company department store elevator operator, a school bus driver, a bakery worker, and a doorman at Radio City Music Hall.

Donahue graduated from Manhattan College in 1949 with a degree in labor relations. Donahue's union career actually started a year before when he became a part-time organizer for the Retail Clerks International Association. From 1949 to 1957, he held several positions within Local 32B, the flagship local of the Building Service Employees International Union (BSEIU), including business agent, education director, contractor director, and publications editor. Meanwhile, he attended night classes at Fordham Law School and received his law degree in 1956.

In 1957, he became the European labor program coordinator for the Free Europe Committee in Paris. He returned to the United States in 1960 to take a position as executive assistant to David Sullivan, the newly elected president of the BSEIU.

Many years later, Donahue would tell interviewers that Sullivan "remains my hero in the trade union movement." "He was an Irish immigrant who came here in 1926 and was an elevator operator at the start, and became active in the union. He then led the reform faction in the union to oust a racket-dominated leadership."

Donahue was nominated by President Lyndon Johnson as Assistant Secretary for Labor-Management Relations in the Labor Department in 1967. He served in that position until the end of the Johnson administration in 1969, then returned to the Service Employees International Union, as it was by then called, where he served as executive secretary and later first vice-president.

Donahue became executive assistant to the president of the AFL-CIO, George Meany, in 1973.

== Career as a Labor Leader ==
Already an influential figure as Meany's executive assistant, when Meany retired in 1979, Donahue was elected Secretary-Treasurer, the second-highest ranking position in the AFL-CIO. The week of his election, The New York Times reported that "His position is a strong one. The federation is generally regarded as the voice of labor. And Mr. Donahue is an intelligent man with clear opinions." He was re-elected at seven AFL-CIO biennial conventions.

For the next 16 years, Donahue was involved in virtually every part of the trade union movement. His strongest influence was considered to be in three areas: the campaign against the North American Free Trade Agreement (NAFTA), rejuvenation of the union movement, and advancing Catholic social teaching on workers' rights.

=== NAFTA ===
On December 17, 1992, President George H. W. Bush, Canadian Prime Minister Brian Mulroney, and Mexican President Carlos Salinas met in Texas to sign the NAFTA, which would create a trilateral trade bloc and financial zone in North America. To take effect, NAFTA had to be ratified by the legislatures in the three countries.

Long before the signing ceremony, Donahue was already leading a massive campaign by the AFL-CIO against US ratification. As early as February 1991, it was reported by The New York Times that "the AFL-CIO has made blocking a Mexican agreement its No. 1 legislative priority".

The main reasons for AFL-CIO opposition were that "it would pave the way for tens of thousands of… jobs to be exported to Mexico, and it would bump hundreds of thousands down the economic ladder to underemployment and low wages", Donahue wrote.

Donahue condemned its "powerfully regressive effect" and noted, "The jobs that are most easily exported to Mexico are not those of probate attorneys, stockbrokers, economists, and editorial writers; they are the jobs of assembly-line workers and others who can least afford a massive disruption of their work lives."

The AFL-CIO was not the only opponent of NAFTA. Others included Ross Perot, the Sierra Club, Greenpeace, Friends of the Earth, the National Farmers Union, the National Council of Senior Citizens, Ralph Nader's Public Citizen, Jerry Brown's We the People, and Jesse Jackson's Rainbow Coalition.

However, an editorial in The Washington Post said that "It's not Ross Perot but the labor movement that's the central force in the campaign to kill NAFTA – the North American Free Trade Agreement. Mr. Perot has little following in Congress, but the unions have been working ferociously to line up their friends and campaign beneficiaries against the agreement."

Donahue succeeded in mobilizing the entire trade union movement against NAFTA. The New York Times reported that "within the labor movement, the campaign against the accord extends far beyond the industrial unions…" 'Our self-interest is very similar,' said Albert Shanker, president of the American Federation of Teachers. When factories close, he said, "community tax revenues plunge, so teachers lose wages and jobs."

Beyond the AFL-CIO, Donahue oversaw what The New York Times described as the federation's "lobbying, petition drives and $3.2 million in billboard and radio advertising." He testified before Congress against NAFTA at least nine times. He appeared on such TV shows as NBC's Meet the Press and CNN's Late Edition. He frequently wrote articles, letters to editors, and op-ed pieces for leading newspapers.

Donahue built a working coalition between the AFL-CIO and leading environmentalists, notably the Sierra Club and the National Toxics Campaign.

Two months later, NAFTA was passed the House by a vote of 234-200 and the Senate by a vote of 61–38. It was signed by President Clinton on December 8, 1993, and went into effect on January 1, 1994.

Nine years later, an Economic Policy Institute briefing paper on NAFTA's effects pointed out that "the rise in the U.S. trade deficit with Canada and Mexico through 2002 has caused the displacement of production that supported 879,280 U.S. jobs. Most of those lost jobs were high-wage positions in manufacturing industries."

It continued, "The loss of these jobs is just the most visible tip of NAFTA's impact on the U.S. economy. In fact, NAFTA has also contributed to rising income inequality, suppressed real wages for production workers, weakened workers' collective bargaining powers and ability to organize unions, and reduced fringe benefits."

=== AFL-CIO Change Agent ===
When Donahue was elected Secretary-Treasurer, he told a reporter, "My hopes for the labor movement are growth, dynamism, militancy."

The chief vehicle for his efforts was the AFL-CIO Committee on the Evolution of Work, which he chaired. Under Donahue, "the group has become the federation's principal think tank for modernizing its structure," according to The New York Times.

It eventually published three reports: "The Future of Work" (August, 1983), "The Changing Situation of Workers and Their Unions" (February, 1985), and "The New American Workplace: A Labor Perspective" (February, 1994).

The most important report of Donahue's committee was "The Changing Situation of Workers and Their Unions." The New York Times summarized its message as: "American unions have fallen 'behind the pace of change,' and should adopt innovative methods for representing their members and for attracting new ones." Its importance was due to its long-term impact on American trade unions

The Times in a front-page story called it a "frank study" and "the first of its type in the history of the nearly 35-year-old AFL-CIO." Albert Shanker, described the report as "a revolutionary document." Similar support was expressed by other members of the committee, including Jack Joyce, president of the International Union of Bricklayers and Allied Craftworkers; Charles Pillard, president of the International Brotherhood of Electrical Workers; Glenn Watts, president of the Communications Workers of America; and Lynn Williams, president of the United Steelworkers

Due to the report, Donahue's committee recommended that "consideration should be given to establishing new categories of membership for workers not employed in an organized bargaining unit." Such a significant structural change would constitute a departure from the normative way that workers became and maintained their status as union members.

At first, it was not universally embraced. When Donahue presented a membership benefits program to the 1985 AFL-CIO convention based on his committee's recommendation, "several local and national union officials who are supposed to carry out the program say they have grave misgivings about it," The Wall Street Journal reported. "They worry that labor's goal of bargaining collectively will be blurred by a special category of members whom the union wouldn't fully represent and probably couldn't count on in a strike."

He and his committee laid the groundwork for:

- Union Privilege, which offers Union Plus consumer benefits to union members and retirees, including mortgage assistance, credit cards with provisions for laid-off and striking workers, supplemental Medicare insurance, and discounts on vision and dental care; and,
- Working America, the AFL-CIO's community affiliate for "workers without the benefit of a workplace union" who support "good jobs, affordable health care, world-class education, secure retirements, real homeland security and more" and are eligible for Union Plus benefits.

Another reform that Donahue championed was systematic, intensive training of a new generation of union organizers. "The Changing Situation of Workers and Their Unions" stated that "[union] organizing is a skill; it is not something that everyone can do and is not something that can be taught in a one-week training session…. Organizers should be extensively trained."

Donahue became an advocate of the AFL-CIO of creating an Organizing Institute (OI). It was launched in 1989. The OI has trained and graduated thousands of union members, staffers, and students.

=== Catholic social teaching ===
Donahue said that the two people who sparked his early interest in the trade union movement were Brother Cornelius Justin, his teacher at Manhattan College, and George Donahue(unrelated), who was president of the National Association of Catholic Trade Unionists. In his formal role as a North American Commentator to the Pontifical Commission on Justice and Peace, Donahue summarized his ideas in a presentation he gave at an international symposium in Rome on the topic of Laborem exercens, Pope John Paul II's encyclical on human work. He praised the Pope's "statements that work must provide 'fulfillment as a human being' and must be arranged so that it also 'corresponds to man's dignity'".

However, Donahue also expressed his conviction that "what the Pope takes for granted as a right of association freely exercised, guaranteed in a democratic society, is often trampled upon in this country and others. And one must conclude that it is trampled upon in pursuit of the profit motive and in an effort to exclude workers from any voice in ownership, or management, or indeed, from any effective participation in the fixing of the conditions under which they will labor".

=== International activity ===
"The American labor movement has always been involved with the well-being of workers in other lands," Donahue wrote in a 2000 letter to the editor of Foreign Affairs magazine that set out his views of the AFL-CIO's international role.

The major areas of Donahue's international work, both as AFL-CIO secretary-treasurer and during his retirement, have been the struggle against South African apartheid and his activism on behalf of Cuban workers.

His involvement in the South African effort in the 1980s included testifying before Congress in opposition to apartheid on three occasions.

Lewis reported that Donahue "said it was time to boycott South African imports and, if necessary, to prohibit U.S. investment in South Africa."

Donahue was later leading advocate of Cuban workers' rights in his role as chair of the Committee for Free Trade Unionism (CFTU). He wrote that the committee supports "the right of Freedom of Association – the right [of workers] to form and join unions of their own choosing, run by people they elect." He has also noted that "the CFTU has been active in recent years in attempts to assist workers in Cuba struggling to assert that right – in the face of their government's insistence that only one union, guided by the Communist Party, can represent them, and against the background of continuing imprisonment and harassment of those who think otherwise."

Donahue served on the board of the National Endowment for Democracy (NED) for ten years between 1997 and 2006 and continued to serve on the organization's Audit & Budget Committee. He served as chairman of the Committee for Free Trade Unionism along with being a board member of the Albert Shanker Institute, and a board member of the Dunlop Agricultural Labor Commission. Donahue was a past member of the boards of the Council on Foreign Relations, the Carnegie Corporation, and the Brookings Institution.

In 1997, Donahue remarked, "For (former AFL-CIO President George) Meany, for (former President Lane) Kirkland, and I hope always for myself, those issues were always fairly clear. Either you stand on the side of democratic forces or you don't."

=== Ireland ===
Donahue led a U.S. labor delegation to Ireland and Northern Ireland in 1983 and met with the Northern Ireland committee of the International Confederation of Free Trade Unions (ICFTU) to discuss discrimination against Catholics within Northern Ireland.

After meetings in Belfast, the delegation met in London with the British Trades Union Congress to press further the case for fair employment principles in Northern Ireland. The call for such reform was embodied in a Report of the Trade Union Delegation to Northern Ireland published in 1983.

During the 1980s, Donahue was a strong advocate for the Sullivan Principles, which called upon U.S. companies operating in Northern Ireland to observe fair employment principles and practices.

In 1996, Donahue was invited to join President Clinton's delegation to Belfast. He was also named a recipient of the annual Bell and Thrush Award by the Irish American Historical Society in recognition and was appointed as the 1997 Grand Marshal of the St. Patrick's Day Parade in Washington, D.C.

== AFL-CIO President ==
Early in 1995, leaders of a broad cross-section of the labor federation's unions encouraged Donahue to challenge incumbent AFL-CIO President Lane Kirkland. Owing to his sense of loyalty to Kirkland, Donahue insisted that he would not oppose Kirkland, who for his part maintained his intent to seek another term. As a result, a faction of dissenting unions decided to abandon their "Draft Donahue" efforts and lined up behind then-SEIU President John Sweeney, a former Donahue protégé and fellow native of The Bronx, New York.

Then, in the late Spring of 1995, Kirkland made it known that he had changed his mind and would resign from office. In August 1995, Donahue was elected interim president by a two-to-one margin over Sweeney in a vote by the AFL-CIO's governing body, its Executive Council. Prior to the vote, Donahue had asked Barbara Easterling, Secretary-Treasurer of the Communications Workers of America, to join his ticket as candidate for the Secretary-Treasurer position. Easterling agreed and was elected as the first female officer in either of the labor federation's two senior positions.

Four months later, John Sweeney ran against Donahue again, this time at the federation's bi-annual convention. His platform included a pledge to add a third national officer (Executive Vice President) and to increase the size of the Executive Council from 33 members to 45. While Donahue remained open to the idea of expanding the number of unions represented on the governing council, he declined to solicit votes on the basis of such a concept.

== Honors ==
Donahue was awarded several post-graduate honorary degrees by several institutions of higher learning, including Notre Dame; Loyola University Chicago; Manhattan College; City University of New York; State University of New York; University of Massachusetts, and the National Labor College. In 1980, he was elected as a Fellow of the National Academy of Public Administration.

== Personal life and death ==
Donahue was married to Natalie Kiernan from 1950 until divorcing in 1975; they had two children. In 1979, he married Rachelle Horowitz, a civil rights activist and executive with the American Federation of Teachers.

After a period of failing health, Donahue died at a hospital in Washington on February 18, 2023, from complications of a fall. He was 94.

Trade union offices
Preceded by Lane Kirkland	Secretary-Treasurer of the AFL–CIO; 1979–1995	Succeeded by Barbara Easterling
Preceded by Lane Kirkland	President of the AFL-CIO; 1995	Succeeded by John Sweeney
Preceded by Morton Bahr	AFL-CIO delegate to the Trades Union Congress; 1993	Succeeded by Final delegate
