= John Sweeney (labor leader) =

American labor leader (1934–2021)

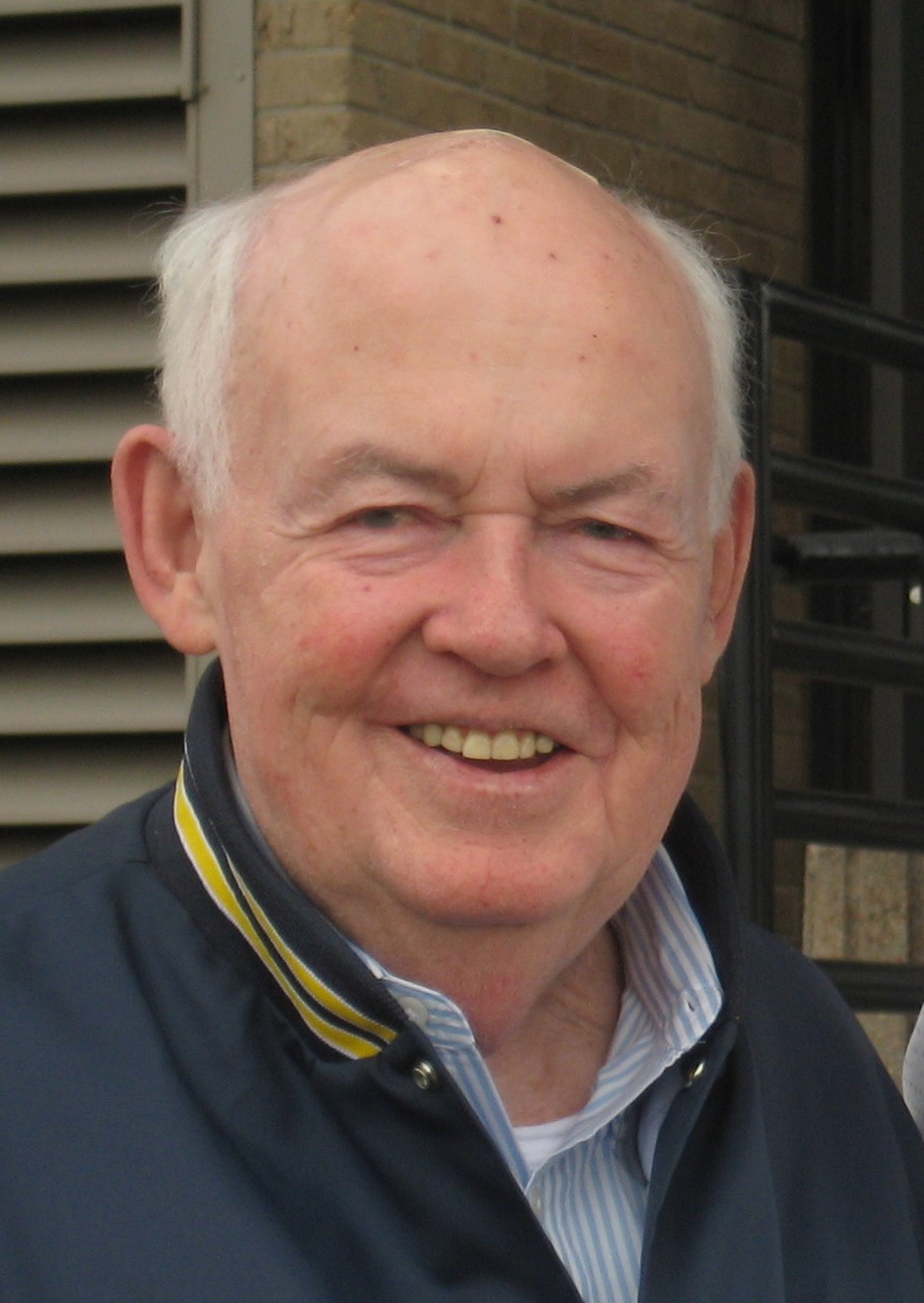
- Sweeney in 2008

4th President of the AFL–CIO
- In office 1995–2009
- Preceded by: Thomas R. Donahue
- Succeeded by: Richard Trumka

8th President of the Service Employees International Union
- In office 1980–1995
- Preceded by: George Hardy
- Succeeded by: Richard Cordtz

Personal details
- Born: John Joseph Sweeney; May 5, 1934 The Bronx, New York, U.S.
- Died: February 1, 2021 (aged 86) Bethesda, Maryland
- Spouse: Maureen P. Sweeney
- Parent(s): James Sweeney, Agnes Sweeney
- Education: Iona College
- Occupation: Labor leader

John Joseph Sweeney (May 5, 1934 – February 1, 2021) was an American labor leader who served as president of the AFL–CIO from 1995 to 2009.

== Early years ==
Born in The Bronx, New York, Sweeney was the son of James, a city bus driver, and Agnes, a domestic worker, both Irish immigrants. Sweeney's family moved to Yonkers in 1944, where Sweeney attended St. Barnabas Elementary School and graduated from Cardinal Hayes High School. Sweeney's father took him to numerous union meetings, and it was there that Sweeney began his lifelong commitment to the American labor movement.

Sweeney enrolled at Iona College in New Rochelle in 1952. Sweeney worked as a grave-digger and building porter to pay his tuition, and joined his first union at this time. In 1956, he graduated with a degree in economics.

== Union career with ILGWU and SEIU ==
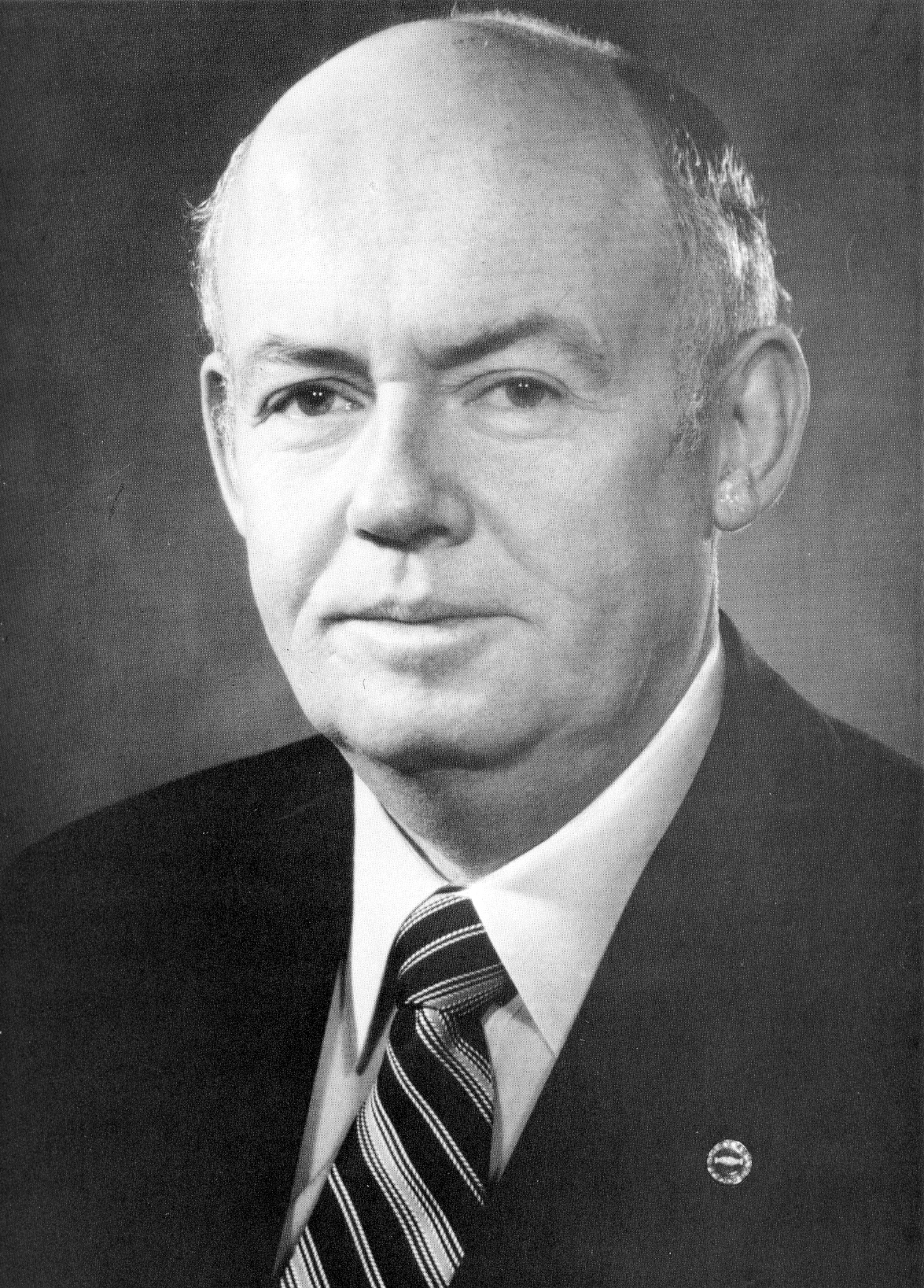
Sweeney during his presidency of SEIU Local 32B-32J.

After graduation, Sweeney became a clerk at IBM. But his commitment to the labor movement led Sweeney to take a two-thirds cut in pay to become a researcher with the International Ladies Garment Workers Union in 1956 (now UNITE HERE).

In time, Sweeney met Thomas R. Donahue, then a union representative with the Building Service Employees International Union (BSEIU, now the Service Employees International Union or SEIU). Donahue asked Sweeney to leave the ILGWU, and he became a contract director with BSEIU Local 32B in 1960. BSEIU changed its name to the Services Employees International Union in 1968. In 1972, Sweeney became assistant to the president of Local 32B in addition to his existing duties as contract director. He was elected to the executive board of Local 32B the same year. In 1973, Sweeney was elected vice president of the local.

In 1976, John Sweeney was elected president of Local 32B. He resigned his position as contract director. Three months after taking office, Sweeney led the 45,000 members of SEIU out on a surprise strike against the New York Realty Advisory Board a day before the union's contract was due to expire. After 17 days, the union won a new contract with significant wage and benefit increases. In 1977, Sweeney merged Local 32B with Local 32J to form Local 32BJ. In 1979, Sweeney led the maintenance workers of Local 32BJ out on strike again, and won additional contract improvements.

In 1980, Sweeney was elected president of the national SEIU. Sweeney continued to serve as president of Local 32BJ until mid-1981, and drew a salary as a consultant to the local until 1995. Under Sweeney's tenure, SEIU made rapid gains in membership. The union began the decade with about 625,000 members. However, Sweeney began pushing for rapid expansion into new sectors and base areas. SEIU joined with the National Association of Working Women to organize office workers, and the United Food and Commercial Workers (UFCW) to organize nursing home workers. The union also dramatically expanded its reach among maintenance workers in the health care field and business offices.

Sweeney also pushed for mergers with a number of other unions, absorbing the National Association of Government Employees (NAGE) and other public employee unions.

By 1993, SEIU had more than one million members. It was the first AFL–CIO union to reach the million-member mark in more than 20 years. But while Sweeney had emphasized the organization of new members, about half of its growth had come through merger. Sweeney initiated other changes at SEIU as well. The union began pushing for stronger federal laws in the area of health and safety, sexual harassment, and civil and immigrant rights. It also advocated for legally-mandated paid family leave, health care reform and a raise in the minimum wage. Internally, Sweeney devoted nearly a third of the union's budget to organizing new members and pushed for stronger diversity in the union's ranks.

== 1995 campaign for presidency of the AFL–CIO ==
In 1995, Sweeney and a small group of other national union presidents approached AFL–CIO president Lane Kirkland and asked that he retire. Dissatisfaction with Kirkland's leadership had grown in the early 1990s. There were a number of issues: Failure to pass labor law reform in President Bill Clinton's first term, failure to stop the North American Free Trade Agreement (NAFTA), failure to achieve health care reform, failure to pass legislation banning the permanent replacement of strikers, and failure to shift public discourse in a more liberal, pro-union direction. The fact that Kirkland was traveling in Europe while the U.S. Senate was considering the ban on permanent replacements was seen as all too indicative of his real priorities. Most frustrating of all was Kirkland's lackluster response to the Republican takeover of Congress in 1994. He seemed blatantly uninterested, even hostile, to plans calling for a more aggressive political program.

=== Opposition ===
The opposition to Kirkland came to a head at the mid-winter AFL–CIO executive council meeting in Bal Harbour, Florida, February 19–20, 1995. Since the start of the new year, Sweeney had twice held meetings with Kirkland to tell him that key members of the executive council were disappointed with his leadership and that he should step down in favor of secretary-treasurer Thomas R. Donahue.

The weekend before the executive council meeting, 11 union presidents on the executive council agreed to form a "Committee for Change". The group was committed to removing Kirkland as president of the AFL–CIO. The group included Sweeney; Gerald McEntee of the American Federation of State, County and Municipal Employees (AFSCME); Owen Bieber of the United Auto Workers (UAW); George Becker of the United Steelworkers of America (USWA); Ron Carey of the International Brotherhood of Teamsters (IBT); Arthur Coia of the Laborers' International Union of North America (LIUNA); Wayne Glenn of the United Paperworkers International Union (UPIU); Frank Hanley of the International Union of Operating Engineers (IUOE); George Kourpias of the International Association of Machinists (IAM); Sigurd Lucassen of the United Brotherhood of Carpenters and Joiners of America (UBC); and Richard Trumka of the United Mine Workers of America (UMWA). Together, these unions had sufficient votes to remove Kirkland at the October AFL–CIO convention and elect a new president.

The first choice of the Committee for Change was AFL–CIO secretary-treasurer Thomas R. Donahue, who had developed a reputation as an effective innovator. He had lobbied for the creation of an AFL–CIO committee to examine changes in the workplace, pioneered the federation's communication efforts (including the construction of a television studio at AFL–CIO headquarters) and led the campaign against NAFTA. But Donahue refused to challenge a man whom he had served loyally for nearly 16 years.

Kirkland refused to resign or retire. The executive council meeting turned rancorous. The dissident members of the executive council argued for a change in leadership and policy. But Kirkland pointed to his administration's policies and initiatives and claimed that the dissidents were disloyal and power-hungry.

On May 8, 1995, Donahue announced he was resigning as secretary-treasurer effective at the October AFL–CIO convention. The next day, Kirkland announced he was running for re-election.

The Committee for Change decided to run its own candidate against Kirkland. McEntee was considered too abrasive and had aggressively pursued disputes with other unions to be a consensus candidate. Trumka was considered too young and too militant. In contrast, Sweeney had a reassuring demeanor, an amiable personality and many friends on the executive council. He also would be seen as the "organizing candidate" the group wanted.

The group also agreed to nominate Trumka as secretary-treasurer of the AFL–CIO. The group also proposed to create a new office, that of executive vice-president, charged with mobilizing state federations and central labor councils and reaching out to minorities and women. The new position was also a way of ensuring that there would be an executive position which could be filled with a woman or a minority, thus gaining additional political support for the dissidents. The Committee for Change recruited Linda Chavez-Thompson, a member of the AFL–CIO executive council, a vice-president of AFSCME and an activist on the Labor Council for Latin American Advancement.

On June 13, the Committee formally announced its slate of candidates and the name of its platform, "A New Voice for American Workers". The slate of candidates became known as the "New Voice" slate. Shortly thereafter, 10 more unions announced their opposition to Kirkland's re-election. Now a total of 21 unions representing 56 percent of the delegates to the convention were opposed to Kirkland's presidency.

Faced with such discouraging numbers, Kirkland announced that he would resign effective August 1.

With Kirkland's resignation, the principal reason for Donahue's reluctance to run for president disappeared. The same day as Kirkland's announcement, Donahue withdrew his retirement announcement and said he would now run for the presidency of the AFL–CIO.

In the interim, however, support for Donahue among the dissident unions (which had changed its name to the "New Voice" slate) had dissipated.

At the August AFL–CIO executive council meeting, Donahue was elected by unanimous vote as the new AFL–CIO president. For the office of secretary-treasurer, the council elected Barbara Easterling, secretary-treasurer of the Communication Workers of America. Easterling announced that she would run with Donahue in October.

Opposition to the New Voice slate was led by the American Federation of Teachers (AFT) and Communication Workers of America (CWA). AFT president Albert Shanker argued that the dissidents should have brought their concerns before the executive council, where, after discussion and deliberation, a decision about Kirkland's fate could have been made. Shanker also argued that exposing the labor movement's internal disputes to labor's enemies seriously risked weakening the labor movement. Finally, Shanker argued that the New Voice slate's attempt to mobilize state and local labor bodies in favor of one candidate risked politicizing the AFL–CIO and destabilizing it in the long run.

The New Voice group, however, understood that their only hope for success was to move the debate out of the executive council. In the executive council, each union—no matter how small—had an equal vote. A group of 20 small unions could make binding decisions even though their membership might be far less than that of their opponents. But at the AFL–CIO convention, each union was allotted delegates proportional to the size of its membership. At the convention, a coalition of large unions could triumph even if they did not represent a majority of unions. It would have been foolish for the New Voice slate, whose base was in some of the largest unions in the AFL–CIO, to pursue their goals in the executive council where their votes counted for less.

A public debate over the AFL–CIO's future had rarely been seen in the history of the American labor movement. The New Voice ticket campaigned intensively for the support of the state federations and central labor councils (CLCs), each of which was entitled to send one delegate to the convention. Normally, few of these bodies sent delegates to the quadrennial convention. But New Voice slate actively recruited delegates, and allegations were made that the slate had agreed to pay travel and housing for delegates if they agreed to support Sweeney. Sweeney also promised that more attention would be paid to these bodies, which the New Voice ticket saw as important in supporting local labor actions and enlarging the federation's political capabilities. Donahue refused to campaign for votes among the state federations and central labor councils, arguing that it would politicize the AFL-CIO and weaken the post-election consensus among the AFL–CIO's various bodies.

By August, it was clear that the New Voice slate would win at least two-thirds of the state federation and CLC votes. Donahue reversed his decision and campaigned for votes among these delegates, but his action came too late: Most of the votes were already locked up.

Both sides hired professional public relations firms to help manage their campaigns, which included media strategies, slogans, graphics, leaflets, press releases, T-shirts, opposition research, posters and videotaped speeches. The candidates also used 'free' media extensively, appearing on 'Meet the Press,' National Public Radio's 'Talk of the Nation,' the Public Broadcasting Service's 'MacNeil-Lehrer NewsHour,' C-SPAN and other shows.

Despite Donahue's energetic campaigning, it soon became clear that his candidacy was profoundly limited by his ties to the Kirkland regime. Donahue was forced to defend the status quo and deny the magnitude of the labor movement's problems when he believed otherwise.

The New Voice political platform persuaded many unions to abandon the status quo. Sweeney called for a major expansion of the federation's role in organizing by: spending $20 million a year on hiring and training thousands of new organizers; mobilizing over 1,000 college students for summer organizing; creating a "Sunbelt Organizing Fund" to sponsor organizing in the South and Southwest; and establishing a separate Organizing Department. Sweeney also proposed creating a Center for Strategic Campaigns to coordinate all national contract campaigns; creating a Strategic Campaign Fund to provide grants to unions in difficult organizing and contract fights; creating a Strike Support Team of organizers that could be deployed to help support strikes; and establishing a Pension Investment Clearinghouse to provide information on how pensions are invested and to help mobilize investments in support of organizing. Sweeney also called for a modification of labor's political tactics and withdrawal of support for Democrats who did not support labor's agenda. Sweeney recommended creating a National Labor Political Training Center to recruit and train candidates and political campaign directors, and establishing a Labor Center for Economic and Public Policy that would develop policy analysis, support the federation's legislative agenda and expand the political activities of the state federations and central labor councils.

Finally, Sweeney argued that it was time to revamp the AFL–CIO itself. The New Voice platform promised more effective consultation with state federations and central labor councils, better ties with women and minority groups, expansion of the executive council to insure more women and minority representation, creation of the office of executive vice-president, annual meetings of the general board, restructuring of the trade and industrial departments and a rule that no one over the age of 70 could run for any executive office.

Partly in response to the New Voice platform and partly because he believed change was, in fact, needed, Donahue began to implement some of the New Voice reforms. He diverted revenue from the Union Privilege program into a new organizing fund that would eventually pay out $20 million a year. He increased the budget of the Organizing Institute, approved plans to double the number of organizers recruited and trained each year, and obtained executive council approval to provide no-interest loans to support striking unions. Donahue also diverted Union Privilege money to train 500 activists to work in the 1996 congressional elections.

At the AFL–CIO convention in New York City, a record-breaking 1,047 delegates gathered to determine the AFL–CIO's future. When the votes were finally counted on October 25, 1995, John Sweeney had secured the support of 34 unions representing 7,286,837 members, or 57 percent of the AFL–CIO's membership. As a result of New Voice efforts, the number of delegates from state federation and local central labor councils rose from 186 at the 1993 convention to 488 in 1995.

The New Voice ticket then asked the convention to implement its platform. Subsequently, the convention voted to provide state federations with representation on the AFL–CIO general board, which had previously been open only to national union presidents. The convention also expanded the AFL–CIO executive council from 33 to 54 members. Sweeney offered these new seats to previously unrepresented unions. The expansion nearly doubled representation for women and minorities on the council. The expansion had the added advantage of enabling both Sweeney supporters and Donahue loyalists to sit on the council, encouraging reconciliation. A 'unity slate' of executive council members was announced by Douglas H. Dority, president of the UFCW and a key Donahue supporter, and Gerald McEntee. The unity slate helped avoid the threat of disaffiliations from the labor federation.

== First decade in office ==
=== Structural changes ===
Soon after taking office, Sweeney initiated several programs intended to reverse the decline in union membership and recruit more new members, especially younger people. The AFL–CIO's organizing and field mobilization programs were separated. The Field Mobilization department was given control over the AFL–CIO's regional offices, which were reduced from 12 to four. Sweeney set a goal of spending one-third of the federation's budget on organizing by 1998. An ad hoc executive council committee was established to come up with an organizing strategy for the South and Southwest, while the Union Summer program was established to recruit and deploy college-age activists. A new department, the Working Women's Department, was created and charged with developing ways to give working women a voice and to inject that voice into the labor movement's deliberations.

Two new centers were also established. The new political training center's mission was to train political operatives and assist affiliates in training their staff in political work. The transnational corporate research center's mission was to help unions in organizing and/or contract battles with international corporations.

In August 1996, Sweeney created a Corporate Affairs Department. The department included three new centers: the Center for Workplace Democracy (to deal with labor-management partnerships), the Center for Worker Ownership and Governance (to deal with pension and investment issues) and the Center for Strategic Research (to assist affiliates with research in comprehensive campaigns). The department also was given responsibility for collecting statistics and conducting research on collective bargaining.

In May 1997, Sweeney announced four new organizing programs. The first program was an AFL–CIO-based effort to provide logistical, organizational and training support for state and local unions which wanted to create organizing programs. The second program 'Senior Summer', a program to leverage the labor movement's retirees by training retired workers in organizing and political operations. The third program was the "Union Cities" effort to encourage large central labor councils to be more active and effective, and to encourage smaller CLCs to merge or work more closely to enhance their influence. Lastly, the 'Street Heat' program funneled funds and staff to CLCs and unions so that they could develop rapid-response teams of union members to picket and/or protest when workers were intimidated, coerced or fired.

In October 1998, Sweeney renamed the AFL–CIO's 30-year-old Human Resources Development Institute (HRDI). It was now known as the Working for America Institute. Instead of focusing on education and training for displaced workers, the department's new mission was to promote economic development, act as a think-tank and policy development foundation, and lobby Congress on economic policy.

=== Brewing unrest ===
But dissatisfaction began to build once again within the AFL–CIO. The elimination of a number of constitutional and administrative departments, such as the Industrial Union Department, was seen as a strike against those unions which had not supported Sweeney. The directorship of the AFL–CIO Organizing Department was a revolving door, organization of new members had not markedly increased and many unions had taken to raiding one another to increase membership. A number of unions were unhappy with what they saw as AFL–CIO criticism of their organizing programs.

On March 15, 2000, the United Transportation Union disaffiliated from the AFL–CIO over a jurisdictional dispute. It was followed in March 2001 by the Carpenters union, which claimed that Sweeney's organizing efforts had failed and that the AFL-CIO structure must be abandoned.

Despite substantial investment in politics, the AFL–CIO had not succeeded in restoring the Democrats to a majority in the U.S. House of Representatives. Some union presidents began to argue that the AFL–CIO should stop spending money on political causes and divert resources to organizing new members. Prominent among the dissatisfied leaders was Andrew Stern, president of SEIU and a Sweeney protege.

The growing unrest within the AFL–CIO became public when Sweeney announced on September 18, 2003, that he planned to run for another four-year term at the federation convention in the summer of 2005. When Sweeney had first been elected of the AFL–CIO in 1995, he had proposed a constitutional amendment which would bar anyone 70 years of age or older from seeking executive office. The proposed amendment was never acted on, but Sweeney promised the convention he would not remain in office beyond the age limit he had proposed.

== 2005 campaign for presidency of the AFL–CIO ==
=== New Unity Partnership ===
Shortly after the March 2004 executive council meeting, Andrew Stern announced the formation of the New Unity Partnership (NUP). Joining Stern were the presidents of UNITE HERE, the Teamsters, the Laborers, UFCW and the Carpenters. Stern had begun working with these union leaders in the fall of 2003 to create a set of principles to reform the labor movement. Although NUP's existence had been revealed in October 2003, the group did not announce its platform until March 2004.

=== Platforms ===
The NUP platform included a number of proposals. First, the AFL–CIO should mandate the merger of smaller unions with larger ones, and the AFL–CIO must redraw and enforce jurisdictional lines along those of major industries, or "core jurisdictions". Second, a number of AFL–CIO departments (including health and safety, education, and civil and human rights) must be merged or eliminated. Third, political spending must be significantly reduced in favor of major new AFL–CIO spending on organizing.

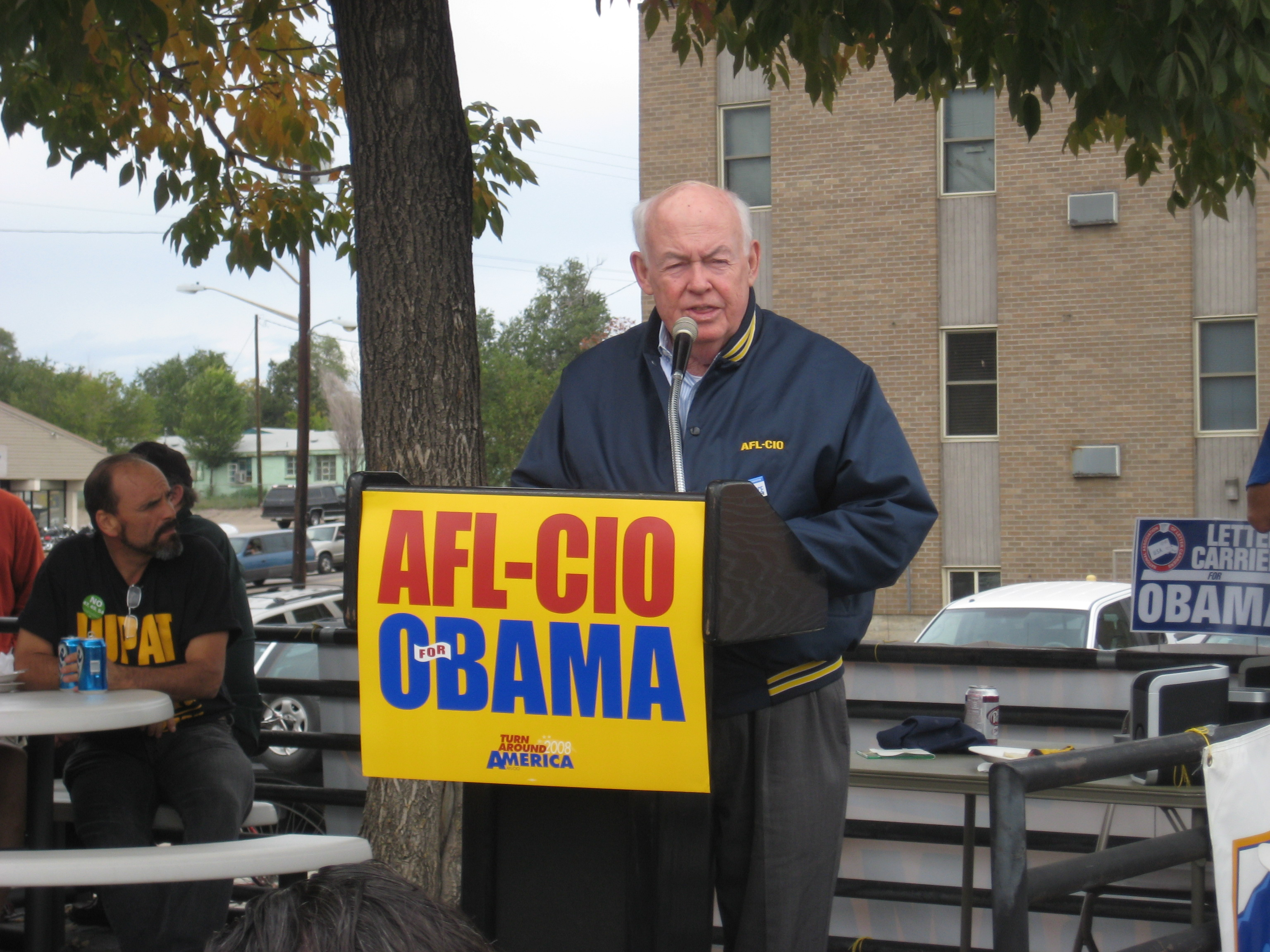
John Sweeney in October 2008

Sweeney told the press he would initiate an internal discussion of Stern's views after the November 2004 presidential election, with a goal of creating a proposal by July 2005. But Stern declared that this would be too late for consideration at the AFL–CIO's biennial convention.

=== Implementation of criticisms ===
At the August 2004 AFL–CIO executive council meeting, Sweeney attempted to implement some of NUP's criticisms by announcing the formation of a task force to investigate organizing the Wal-Mart grocery and discount department store chain. Sweeney also announced the creation of an Immigrant Worker Project to oversee the federation's work on immigrant rights and organizing efforts.

On November 10, 2004, Sweeney announced a process and timeline for considering reform of the AFL–CIO. Sweeney said he would chair a committee composed of the federation's 25-member executive committee which would make reform recommendations to the February 2005 AFL–CIO executive council meeting.

=== New Unity Partnership: 2005 ===
In January 2005, Stern announced that the New Unity Partnership had disbanded. Its purpose had been to create discussion over the future of the labor movement, Stern said, and that goal had been accomplished.

At the March 2005 AFL–CIO executive council meeting, however, no consensus on reform emerged. Instead, the executive committee of the AFL–CIO recommended that the federation earmark half of all income for political and legislative mobilization. The executive committee also recommended rebating up to millions of dollars to unions which spent at least 30 percent of their budget on organizing. There appeared to be little support in the executive committee for mandatory mergers.

But several former New Unity Partnership members disagreed with these proposals. The Teamsters demanded a 50 percent of dues to member unions, as well as streamlining the AFL–CIO by moving many of its functions out of the headquarters to the state and local field operations, eliminating other functions, and reducing the size of the executive committee.

In May 2005, Sweeney formally submitted the executive council's proposals to the AFL–CIO convention for consideration in July.

On June 16, Stern and his allies announced the formation of a new organization, the Change to Win Coalition. The Change to Win Coalition included five unions: SEIU, UFCW, the Laborers, UNITE HERE and the Teamsters. They were joined by the Carpenters on June 27. The Change to Win Coalition released a set of proposals for reforming the AFL-CIO that largely reflected its member union's proposals.

In mid-June, the AFL–CIO executive council voted to submit Sweeney's reform plan to the AFL–CIO convention in July. Discussion on the outstanding proposals from the February meeting continued, but no consensus was reached.

Additional counter-proposals were proposed throughout the summer. The Change to Win Coalition union presidents sought and received authority from their governing bodies to disaffiliate from the AFL–CIO, but it became clear that the Change to Win coalition could muster only a third of delegates at the AFL–CIO convention.

On July 22, 2005, the United Farm Workers (UFW) joined the Change to Win Coalition.

=== A contentious convention: 2005 ===
On July 25, 2005, as the AFL–CIO convention got under way, SEIU and the Teamsters announced that the negotiations had failed and that they were disaffiliating from the AFL–CIO. The same day, SEIU, the Teamsters, UFCW and UNITE HERE announced that their delegates would boycott the AFL–CIO convention.

Sweeney angrily denounced the disaffiliations. Gerald McEntee called the disaffiliation threats a power-play, claiming that the Change to Win coalition had demanded that Sweeney announce his retirement within six months and endorse a replacement of their choosing.

With the Change to Win unions boycotting the AFL–CIO convention, Sweeney's re-election and the adoption of his reform plans became a foregone conclusion.

On July 29, UFCW disaffiliated from the AFL–CIO, bringing the total number of members lost to 4.6 million of the AFL–CIO's 13 million members.

On September 13, the 450,000-member union UNITE HERE voted to disaffiliate from the AFL–CIO.

The breakaway unions officially formed a new labor federation, Change to Win, on September 27, 2005.

Both Sweeney and Change to Win reached out to one another after the break-up of the AFL–CIO, although the relationship was difficult. Sweeney primarily focused on stabilizing the AFL–CIO and its state, area and local bodies financially, structurally and politically. Sweeney kept a relatively low profile, seeking the spotlight only during disputes with Change to Win or when addressing national issues such as immigration policy.

Sweeney retired as President of the AFL–CIO on September 16, 2009, and became President Emeritus. He won the "Roving Ambassador for Peace" award from the World Peace Prize Awarding Council in 2016, because of his long-standing devotion to social justice and fair employment opportunities for American workers.

== Personal life ==
Sweeney co-edited a study about the labor movement and co-wrote two books about unions, including America Needs a Raise: Fighting for Economic Security and Social Justice. He was married to Maureen Power, a former schoolteacher, and lived with her in Bethesda, Maryland. He had two children, John (an information technology professional) and Patricia (who owns a site selection company, Sweeney Contract Solutions, LLC). He has a granddaughter, Kennedy. He was also a member of the Democratic Socialists of America.

Sweeney's hobbies included golf and bowling. He died on February 1, 2021, at his home in Bethesda at the age of 86.

Trade union offices
Preceded by Thomas R. Donahue	President of the AFL–CIO; 1995–2009	Succeeded by Richard Trumka
Preceded by George Hardy	President of the Service Employees International Union; 1980–1995	Succeeded by Richard Cordtz
Preceded by Sol Chaikin	AFL-CIO delegate to the Trades Union Congress; 1982	Succeeded by Joyce D. Miller
