= James Boland (disambiguation) =

James Boland (1856–1894) was an Irish republican.

James Boland may also refer to:

== Other people ==
- James C. Boland, American businessman
- Jim Boland (unionist), Irish-born American labor union leader
- Jim Boland (rugby league), see List of Parramatta Eels players

== Fictional characters ==
- Jimmy Boland, principal character in Bloodfist III: Forced to Fight
- Jimmy Boland, minor television series character, see list of Falling Skies characters
