= Gus Bevona =

Gus Bevona (October 20, 1940 – September 21, 2010) was an American labor leader who served starting in 1981 as head of Local 32B-32J of the Service Employees International Union, who helped his local's elevator operators and janitors who work in New York City commercial and residential buildings some of the best paid in the country. Bevona was chosen by Richard Cordtz as his running mate in the 1996 election for SEIU president, but Cordtz withdrew after Andy Stern entered the race and Bevona ended his candidacy for secretary-treasurer shortly thereafter. A substantial drop in the 1990s in the size of the local and criticism of his generous pay package as president of the local led to Bevona's resignation in 1999.

== Biography ==
Bevona was born on October 20, 1940, and grew up Manhattan, where his father was suspected of having ties to organized crime. Bevona was hired as a filing clerk by the SEIU local, which had been founded in 1934 after a strike by 25 workers at a Seventh Avenue office building and had grown over the years to become one of the largest in the country.

A threatened strike by workers in apartment buildings in New York City was averted when the Realty Advisory Board that represented building owners agreed in April 1982 to give workers a $65 per week increase over the three-year term of the contract. Bevona called the deal "the best apartment-house contract" in the local's history.

Richard Cordtz, who was running for election as president of the SEIU in 1996, chose Bevona as his running mate as secretary-treasurer. After Andy Stern, the union's organizing director, announced in February 1996 that he would run against Cordtz in the union's first contested presidential election, Cordtz withdrew his candidacy and threw his support behind Stern, and Cordtz withdrew from the race shortly thereafter.

In a February 1998 referendum that gave local members the option to cut Bevona's salary to $122,000 a year, 70% of those casting ballots voted against the proposal.

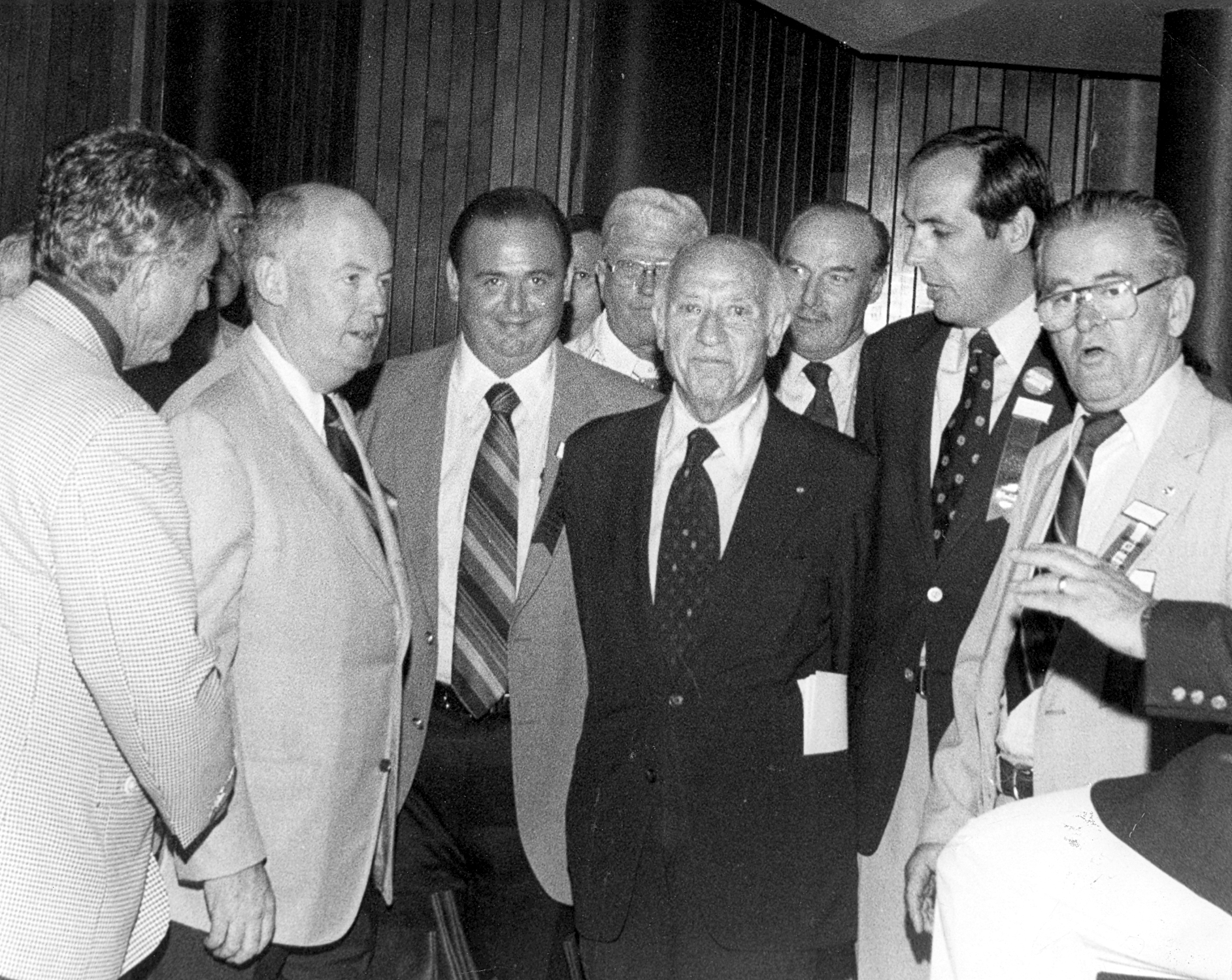
Gus Bevona Jacob K Javits

Citing family and health reasons as being behind his resignation, Bevona stepped down from his post heading the local in 1999. In the months before he left office, he had won a 9% increase for local workers in 1,000 commercial buildings in Manhattan and had been re-elected to head the local with 82% of the vote. Bevona left office as part of a deal in which dissidents would drop a lawsuit that claimed that Bevona had used money from the local to support his re-election bid. Bevona had been facing increasing criticism for receiving a salary that reached $531,529 in 1997 and a lavish package of benefits, more than 17 time the earnings of the building workers he represented. Bevona justified his compensation by pointing to his accomplishments in dealing with building owners in wage negotiations, saying that he had "produced the highest wages, most benefits and most generous benefits" for the workers in 32B-32J. SEIU president Andy Stern singled Bevona out for criticism, saying that none of the officials in the parent union were paid anywhere near what Bevona was earning and that the combination of salary, an apartment and a penthouse office was "excessive". A $100,000 jury verdict in a suit against the local that charged that the local had hired a private investigator to spy on a union dissident also weighed against Bevona. Upon leaving office in February 1999, Bevona received a $1.5 million package that included $850,000 in severance pay and compensation for accrued vacation time that added another $650,000, while Bevona's wife resigned from her position with the local as an administrative assistant and received a $50,000 severance package of her own.

CUNY Graduate Center professor Stanley Aronowitz called Bevona as being "in the tradition of an authoritarian, top-down patriarchal type of leadership" that was "in the egregious tradition of the Teamsters and other unions", while The New York Post called him "the last of the city's labor barons". In the years after Bevona's departure, the 13-room penthouse used by Bevona as his headquarters, which included marble on the floors of its four conference rooms, bathroom showers that could be used as steam rooms and an apartment with an opulently equipped kitchen, was converted into what was called a "member action center". One of the local's workers who saw the offices after Bevona left office said "This guy representing doormen and janitors was living like a king on our sweat".

Bevona died at age 69 on September 21, 2010, and was survived by his wife, Elaine.
