= Timothy Driscoll =

Timothy Driscoll may refer to:

- Tim Driscoll, American football coach
- Tim Driscoll (unionist), American union leader
- Timothy S. Driscoll, American judge
