= Centennial Hill Historic District =

- U.S. National Register of Historic Places
- U.S. Historic district
- Alabama Register of Landmarks and Heritage
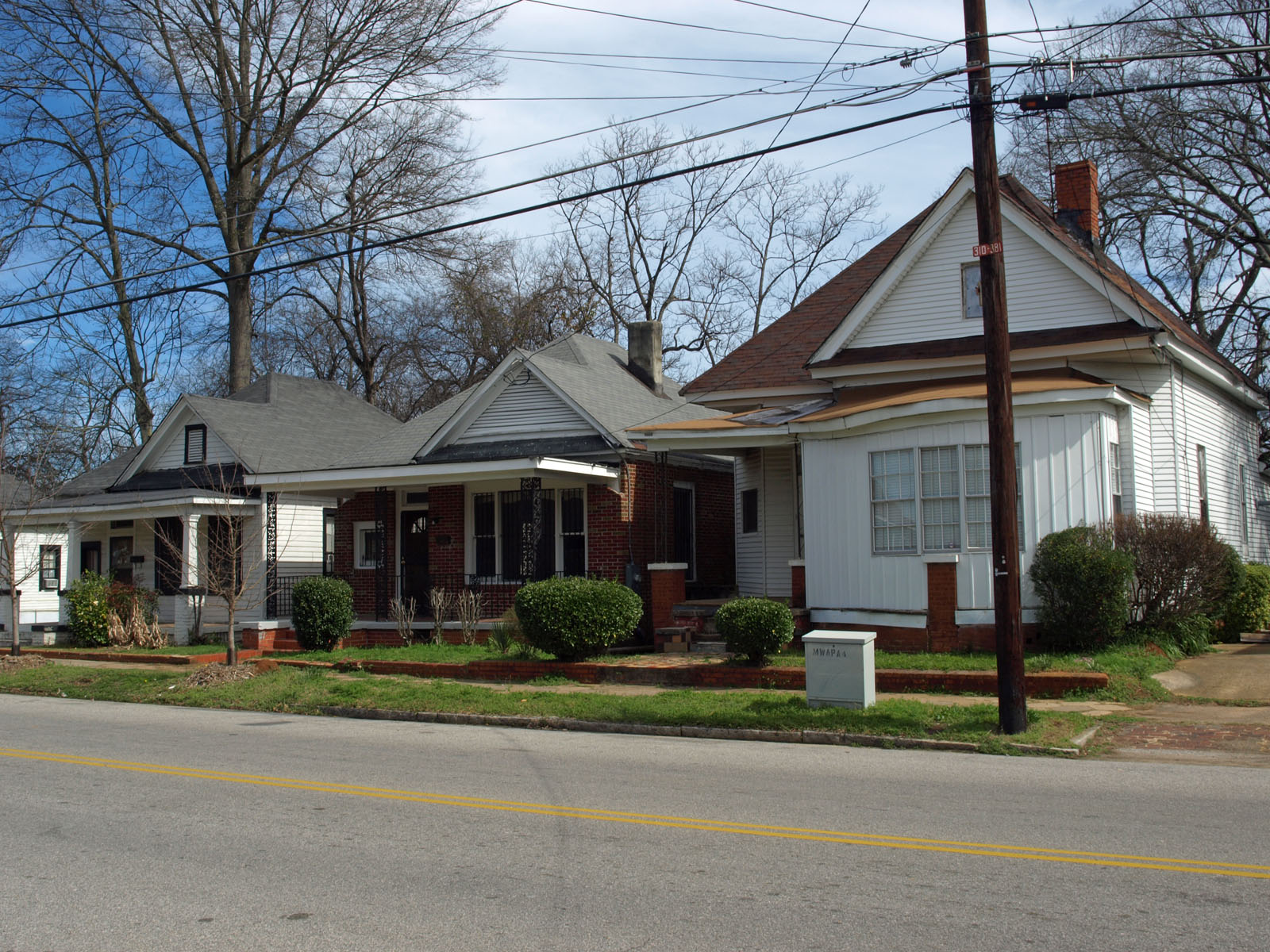
- Houses on South Jackson Street in February 2012
- Interactive map of Centennial Hill Historic District
- Location: Roughly bound by Highland and Adams Avenue to the north, Hall Street to the east, I-85 to the south, and South Bainbridge Street to the west, Montgomery, Alabama
- NRHP reference No.: 100010461

Significant dates
- Added to NRHP: June 25, 2024
- Designated ARLH: April 14, 1992

The Centennial Hill Historic District is a historic district in Montgomery, Alabama. The neighborhood sits to the southeast of downtown Montgomery, and is the city's most historic Black neighborhood. The district was listed on the Alabama Register of Landmarks and Heritage in 1992 and the National Register of Historic Places in 2024.

== History ==
The area began to develop along Union Street between High and Grove Streets after the construction of a Congregational church and Swayne College in 1872. Swayne College closed in 1937 and was demolished in 1948, and replaced with Booker T. Washington School, Montgomery's first high school for African-American students. The community attracted some of the city's most prominent Black leaders, including physician Cornelius N. Dorsette and Victor Tulane, a Tuskegee Institute trustee whose office was completed in 1904. Tulane was a successful businessman who saved up money working as a porter and bought a grocery business. He became a philanthropist. There is a Tulane Circle in Montgomery

The district played a large role in the Civil rights movement, with the Dexter Avenue Baptist parsonage (the home of Martin Luther King Jr.), the Ben Moore Hotel on High Street, and the Bricklayers Union Hall serving as meeting places for civil rights organizers.

In 2026, the National Trust for Historic Preservation listed the Ben Moore Hotel on their annual "America’s 11 Most Endangered Historic Places" due to structural deterioration and nearby real estate development.

== Architecture ==
The bulk of homes in the district were built between the 1880s and 1950s, and reflect styles popular with upper-middle class dwellings of the times, including cottages and bungalows with Victorian, Craftsman, and Tudor Revival details, with shotguns, Minimal Traditional, and Ranch-style houses as later infill. Several churches in the district, such as the Church of the Good Shepherd, have Gothic Revival elements

The neighborhood was severely affected by urban renewal efforts in the 1960s and 1970s, notably the construction of Interstate 85 through the southern portion, and a housing project on the north. Development of office buildings and parking lots continues to erode the district's historic character.
