= Héctor Figueroa (activist) =

Puerto Rican labor activist (1962–2019)

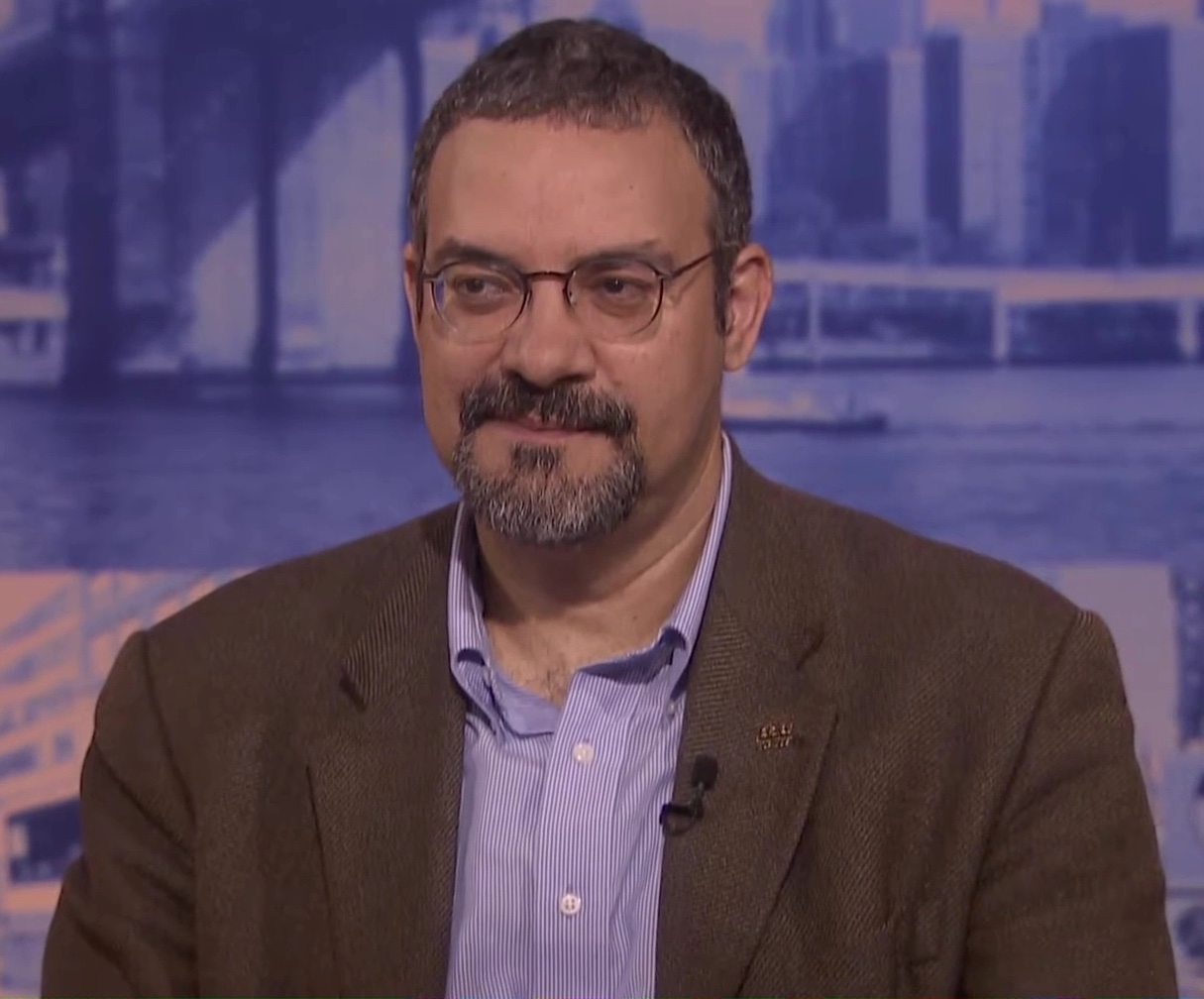
- Figueroa on CUNY TV's City Talk, 2013
- Born: April 3, 1962; Ponce, Puerto Rico
- Died: July 11, 2019 (aged 57); Jackson Heights, Queens
- Education: New York University
- Occupation: President of the Local 32BJ, SEIU
- Years active: 2012–2019
- Organization: Service Employees International Union
- Known for: Labor unionization

Héctor Figueroa (April 3, 1962 – July 11, 2019) was an international labor movement leader. He was president of the Local 32BJ of the Service Employees International Union.

== Early life and education ==
Figueroa was born on April 3, 1962, to Luis and Castita, both educators, in Ponce, Puerto Rico.

He attended the University of Puerto Rico for some time until student protests about tuition increases upset the campus. Then, he moved to Bronx, New York, with his aunt in 1982. He received his bachelor's degree in economics from New York University. He then studied economics at the New School for Social Research in Manhattan, New York.

== Union activism ==
Figueroa started his labor movement activism in the Amalgamated Clothing and Textile Workers Union, now Workers United, in New York. He then moved to the service workers union in Washington until he moved back Puerto Rico to organize workers.

Figueroa moved back to New York and served as the secretary-treasurer for the Local 32BJ Service Employees International Union in 2000. He was elected to serve as the Local's president in 2012. Local 32BJ SEIU represents between 160,000-170,000 building cleaners, security guards, doormen, and airport employees. Under his leadership, the local added around 50,000 members and expanded its political impact.

He supported the Fight for $15 campaign, which seeks to increase the wages of fast food workers, from when it was still only in New York. He told the New York Times that the fast food industry "as a whole is not meeting the needs of its workers by fundamentally basing their model on the poverty of working people."

Due to protests and Figueroa's private meetings with elected officials and their appointees, the Port Authority of New York and New Jersey increased the minimum wage to $19 of about 40,000 employees at the three main airports in New York City.

Figueroa supported Amazon's motion to build a second corporate headquarter in Queens, saying that he wanted to get the company on "home field" to start organizing Amazon laborers from there. He stated:

If there is any place where it would be possible to leverage the labor movement’s existing power to crack open the door to collective bargaining for Amazon workers, it is here.

== Personal life ==
He was married to Maria Ríos. The couple had a son, Eric, before divorcing. He then married Deidre McFadyen and had a daughter, Elena. He was known by friends to be great at drawing caricatures.

== Death ==
He died of a heart attack in his home at Jackson Heights, Queens, New York.
