= Richard Cordtz =

American labor leader (1921–2006)

- Born: Richard Webster Cordtz; December 20, 1921; Chicago, Illinois, U.S.
- Died: November 20, 2006 (aged 84); Dearborn, Michigan, U.S.
- Occupations: Brass worker, union organizer, labor leader
- Spouse: Tina Cordtz

Richard Webster Cordtz (December 20, 1921 – November 20, 2006) was an American labor leader. From 1980 to 1995, he was the International Secretary-Treasurer of the Service Employees International Union under John Sweeney, and was president of the union himself from October 1995 to May 1996.

== Early life ==
Cordtz was born in Chicago, Illinois, in December 1921. He graduated from high school, but rather than attending college he worked in a brass manufacturing plant in Kenosha, Wisconsin, and joined his first union.

During World War II, he served in the United States Army in the South Pacific. After the war, he attended college in San Diego, California. He worked part-time at Del Mar Racetrack, where he joined SEIU Local 102.

Cordtz and his wife, Tina, had three children.

== SEIU career ==
Cordtz began working as a union organizer for Local 102 in 1947. He was assigned to organizing campaigns in Colorado in 1950, and was elected vice-president of the Colorado Federation of Labor at the age of 30.

Cordtz was assigned to SEIU Local 79, a union representing healthcare workers in Hazel Park, Michigan, in 1953. He was elected the local's president in 1956, and over the next 27 years expanded the union's membership from 1,000 to 20,000 and branched out to include custodial workers, fire fighters, security guards and non-salaried hospital workers. Cordtz was also elected president of SEIU Joint Council 35 (a coalition of Detroit-area SEIU locals), and president of Service Employees Central States Conference (a coalition of SEIU councils and state, regional and local bodies in the Midwest). Cordtz also served as vice-president of Metropolitan Detroit AFL-CIO and on the board of directors of the Michigan State AFL-CIO.

Cordtz rose within the SEIU international hierarchy as well. He was elected a member of the SEIU Executive Board in 1968, an International Vice President in 1972, and International Secretary-Treasurer in 1980. While he served as SEIU Secretary-Treasurer, Cordtz also was elected secretary-treasurer of the Conference of Secretary-Treasurers of the AFL-CIO, vice-president of the AFL-CIO Transportation Trades Department, a director of the A. Philip Randolph Institute, an international board member of the International Federation of Commercial, Clerical and Technical Employees, and was a member of the Industrial Relations Research Association.

Cordtz played a prominent role in national union affairs as Secretary-Treasurer. For example, he stood in for SEIU President John Sweeney and publicly opposed a proposed federal takeover of the International Brotherhood of Teamsters in 1986 and again in 1987, even though federal control was designed to eliminate the influence of organized crime in the union. He also often represented SEIU when existing independent locals affiliated with the larger union.

Cordtz retired from his position at the Metropolitan Detroit AFL-CIO in 1991 but his departure from these and other posts — many of which provided him with an income — angered his critics, who accused him of double-dipping.

== SEIU presidency and later life ==
SEIU President John Sweeney won election as President of the AFL-CIO on October 25, 1995. Sweeney resigned as SEIU president on December 12, 1995, and the 74-year-old Cordtz was elected president the same day to serve out his unexpired term (which ended in April 1996).

Cordtz immediately announced that he would run in April 1996 for a full four-year term as SEIU president, but he ran into significant opposition from reformers in the union who felt he was too close to the "old guard" — white, male, highly paid, double-dipping officials who ran the union in an autocratic fashion. John Sweeney, who had once said he would not support electing anyone over the age of 70 to the SEIU presidency, reversed his position and announced his support for Cordtz's candidacy.

To improve his standing in the union, Cordtz adopted many of the militant tactics pioneered by Sweeney and other SEIU leaders. For example, he blocked traffic on a busy San Francisco, California, street in mid-February 1996 to protest the anti-union activities of Vencor Corp., then the nation's second-largest nursing home chain and a target of a major SEIU organizing drive.

As the SEIU convention neared, Cordtz chose Gus Bevona, President of SEIU Local 32B-32J, as his running mate instead of the incumbent (and Sweeney protégé), Betty Bednarczyk. Bevona had succeeded Sweeney as president of the giant janitorial and elevator operators union in New York City in 1980. Bevona suppressed opposition within the union, centralized authority and reduced democratic processes, engaged in a large number of legally- and ethically-questionable side-deals, and associated with known organized crime figures. In 1991, the highly reclusive union leader was earning $412,000 a year while most of his members made a paltry $29,800 a year. By 1996, his salary had ballooned to nearly $450,000 a year, and the New York City press had revealed that he had built himself a palatial office and lived in a union-owned penthouse rent-free. The announcement of the powerful but ethically-questionable Bevona as Cordtz's running mate cost Cordtz the support of John Sweeney.

On February 27, 1996, Andy Stern, SEIU's 45-year-old Organizing Director, announced he would run for the presidency of the union. His announcement created the first contested presidential election in the union's history. Cordtz fired Stern for insubordination on March 1, and asked that Stern's supporters resign from the union's executive board.

SEIU's executive board met on March 11, 1996. By that time, however, it was clear that Stern had the support of Locals representing nearly two-thirds of the union's membership. The same day, Cordtz withdrew from the race and endorsed Stern. Bevona quietly withdrew his candidacy for secretary-treasurer a few weeks later.

Richard Cordtz retired as president of SEIU when delegates to the union's convention in Chicago elected Andy Stern the new president on April 23, 1996.

In retirement, Cordtz continued to serve as chairman of Labor's International Hall of Fame, which he had helped co-found in 1988.

Richard Cordtz died on November 20, 2006, at his home in Dearborn, Michigan. His wife and three children survived him.

== Notes ==
Trade union offices
Preceded by Anthony Weinlein	Secretary-Treasurer of the Service Employees International Union; 1980–1995	Succeeded by Betty Bednarczyk
Preceded by John Sweeney	President of the Service Employees International Union; 1995–1996	Succeeded by Andy Stern
