= SEIU 32BJ =

Building workers' union

32BJ SEIU
- Service Employees International Union, Local 32BJ
- Predecessor: #Merged unions
- Founded: 1977 as SEIU Local 32B-32J
- Merger of: SEIU Local 32B & SEIU Local 32J
- Headquarters: New York City, New York, U. S.
- Location: United States
- Members: 148,201 (2016)
- Key people: Manny Pastreich, President
- Affiliations: Service Employees International Union
- Website: seiu32bj.org

Service Employees International Union, Local 32BJ (often shortened to SEIU 32BJ, 32BJ SEIU or just 32BJ), is a branch of Service Employees International Union headquartered in New York City which mainly represents building workers (maintenance, custodial, janitorial, window cleaners) and has about 150,000 members in ten northeastern states, Washington, D.C., Florida and other parts of the United States.

== Composition ==
According to SEIU 32BJ's Department of Labor records since 2005, when membership classifications were first reported, around a quarter of the union's membership are considered part time.

== History ==
In 1941, James Bambrick, 32B president since its founding, was forced to resign his union post and later served a sentence for embezzlement. Secretary-Treasurer David Sullivan, who had battled for financial integrity and safeguards, was elected to replace Bambrick.

In 1991, members of 32BJ went on a labor strike, and nearly came to strike in 2006 and 2010.

In the 21st century, locals that merged into 32BJ include: Local 615 (previously known as Local 254) (Massachusetts, Rhode Island and New Hampshire, merged 2013)

== Past Presidents ==
- David Sullivan (1941–1960)
- John J. Sweeney (1976–1981), oversaw merger of Local 32J
- Gus Bevona (1981–1999)
- Héctor Figueroa (2012–2019; his death)
- Kyle Bragg (2019-2022)

== See also ==
- International Brotherhood of Stationary Firemen and Oilers
