= John J. Flynn =

American labor union leader

President of the International Union of Bricklayers and Allied Craftworkers
- In office 1999–2010
- Preceded by: Jack Joyce
- Succeeded by: Jim Boland

Personal details
- Born: St. Louis, Missouri, U.S.
- Died: February 12, 2025
- Occupation: Bricklayer, union leader

John J. Flynn was an American labor union leader.

Born in St. Louis, Missouri, Flynn became an apprentice bricklayer in 1952, and joined the International Union of Bricklayers and Allied Craftworkers. He worked in the craft for 20 years, eventually becoming a superintendent. He was elected as business agent of his local union, and then as business manager. Next, he became director of trade jurisdiction for the international union, and then executive vice-president. In this period, he established the union's organizing program.

In 1995, Flynn was elected as secretary-treasurer of the union, and then in 1999 as president. As leader of the union, he promoted training and education for members, and continued to build the organizing program. He also served as a vice-president of the AFL-CIO. He retired in 2010.

Trade union offices
Preceded by L. Gerald Carlisle	Secretary-Treasurer of the International Union of Bricklayers and Allied Craftworkers; 1995–1999	Succeeded by Jim Boland
Preceded by Jack Joyce	President of the International Union of Bricklayers and Allied Craftworkers; 1999–2010	Succeeded by Jim Boland
