= Dexter Parsonage Museum =

Historic house in Montgomery, Alabama

- Pastorium, Dexter Avenue Baptist Church
- U.S. National Register of Historic Places
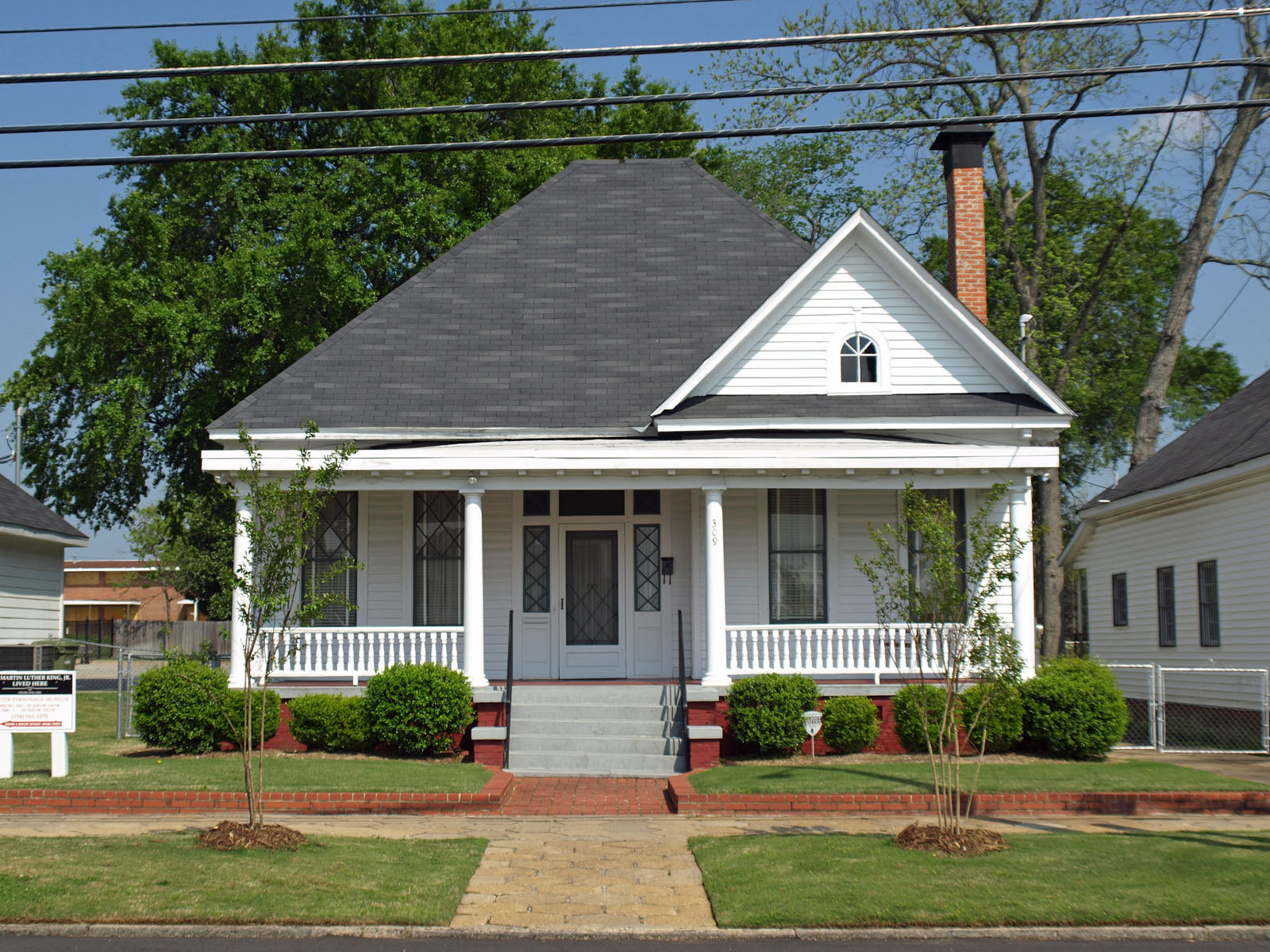
- The house in April 2009

- Location within Alabama
- Interactive map showing the location of Dexter Parsonage Museum
- Location: 309 S. Jackson St., Montgomery, Alabama
- Coordinates: 32°22′23″N 86°17′46″W
- Built: 1912
- Part of: Centennial Hill Historic District (ARLH)
- NRHP reference No.: 82002064
- Added to NRHP: March 10, 1982

The Dexter Parsonage Museum is a historic residence in Montgomery, Alabama. The house was built in 1912 in Centennial Hill, a middle- and upper-class African-American neighborhood. It was purchased in 1919 by the Dexter Avenue Baptist Church for use as their parsonage. It was the home of Martin Luther King Jr. and his family while he was pastor, from 1954 until 1960. In January 1956, during the Montgomery bus boycott, the home was bombed, focusing attention on the boycott and juxtaposing with King's non-violent methods.

The house is a clapboard cottage with a pyramidal roof and gable on the south side of the façade. A full-width shed roofed porch runs across the front, and the entry door has diamond-paneled sidelights and transom. The interior was remodeled in 1966, but original mantels, mouldings and doors remain. During the remodel, the back porch was enclosed and converted to a second bathroom, and the kitchen was modernized. Much of the furniture is the same that was used by the King family.

The house was listed on the National Register of Historic Places in 1982.
