= Jack Joyce (unionist) =

American labor union leader

John T. "Jack" Joyce (December 6, 1935 – February 14, 2013) was an American labor union leader.

Born in Chicago, Joyce followed his father in becoming a bricklayer, and joining the Bricklayers, Masons, and Plasterers International Union. He left to attend the University of Notre Dame, then served in the United States Army for two years, including serving with the American Forces Network as a news writer. He then returned to Chicago, working for the Masonry Institute of Cook County, then becoming administrator of various funds for the bricklayers' union local.

In 1966, Joyce was appointed as secretary of the international union, in which role he set up the International Masonry Institute. He then spent time as the union's treasurer, before in 1979 winning election as its president. As leader of the union, he created new pension and health and safety schemes. He served as a vice-president of the AFL-CIO from 1984, and also on the executive of the International Confederation of Free Trade Unions, in which role he argued that construction unions in poorer countries should link training programs to affordable housing. He also argued for co-operation between construction unions in the United States, and was a strong supporter of Robert Georgine.

In 1998, Joyce ran for re-election, and defeated the union's secretary-treasurer, L. Gerald Carlisle. Carlisle argued that the result should be overturned; he was ultimately unsuccessful, but the litigation lasted until 2002. Joyce retired from the union in 1999, and from the AFL-CIO in 2001.

Trade union offices
Preceded by Thomas F. Murphy	President of the International Union of Bricklayers and Allied Craftworkers; 1979–1999	Succeeded by John J. Flynn
Preceded by Lynn R. Williams	AFL-CIO delegate to the Trades Union Congress; 1986	Succeeded by Lane Kirkland
