= Lorretta Johnson =

American labor union leader and teacher

Lorretta Johnson is an American labor union leader and teacher. From 2011 to 2020, she served as Secretary-Treasurer of American Federation of Teachers.

== Career ==
As a teacher's aide in a Baltimore, Johnson organized paraprofessionals into the Baltimore Teachers Union. She then served as vice president of the Metropolitan Baltimore Council of AFL-CIO Unions.

== American Federation of Teachers leadership ==
From 2008 to 2011, Johnson served as executive vice president of the American Federation of Teachers (AFT). In July 2011, she was elected Secretary-Treasurer. That same year, she was elected treasurer of AFT's Educational Foundation and chair of its Benefit Trust. Johnson was an AFT vice president for 30 years, and chaired AFT's Paraprofessionals and School-Related Personnel program and policy council for 32 years. In 2014, Johnson chaired AFT's Racial Equity Task Force, which issued the report "Reclaiming the Promise of Racial Equity in Education, Economics and Our Criminal Justice System."

== Awards and recognitions ==
Johnson's awards include the 2018 Economy and Labor Service award from the Baltimore County Democratic Party 2005 Labor Leader of the Year from the Maryland Democratic Party, and an honorary doctorate from Coppin State University.
