= General Holiefield =

General Holiefield (June 6, 1953 – March 9, 2015) was an American labor union leader.

Born in Middletown, Ohio, Holiefield was known as "Rob" while growing up, but in adulthood went by his legal name of "General". In 1973, he found work at Chrysler's Jefferson Assembly Plant in Detroit. He joined the United Auto Workers (UAW), and after he was fired from his job, the union helped him reclaim the position. This inspired him to become active in the union, and in 1993 he was elected as president of his local.

In 1995, Holiefield began working full-time for the UAW's Chrysler Department, initially covering servicing, and then from 1997, as Appeals Board Co-ordinator. In 1999, he became an assistant director of the department, and then in 2002 assistant to the vice-president. In 2006, he won election as vice-president of the UAW, leading its Chrysler Department, the first African American to hold the post.

Holiefield led the union's negotiations with Chrysler on pay and conditions, and in 2009 helped persuade Barack Obama's automotive task force to give aid to the company, rather than liquidate it. In 2010, he was additionally elected as a vice-president of the AFL-CIO. In 2012 and 2013, he agreed to longer shifts for workers at Chrysler, something which was unpopular with union members.

In 2011, Holiefield was arrested in connection with domestic violence, but no charges were pressed. In 2013, he shot his wife, in what he described as an accident which occurred when he was cleaning his guns. He took a leave of absence for a month, and when he returned to work, he was soon diagnosed with pancreatic cancer, and took early retirement in 2014. He died the following year.

Holiefield also served on the board of directors of the NAACP, and held membership of the Michigan Democratic Party.

In 2017, Holiefield's wife, and his negotiating counterpart at Chrysler, were indicted over a fraud in which they embezzled more than $2 million of Chrysler money. His wife was later sentenced to 18 months in prison for her part in the crime.
