= International Union of Bricklayers and Allied Craftworkers =

North American AFL–CIO Craft Union

Bricklayers (BAC)
- International Union of Bricklayers and Allied Craftworkers
- Founded: 1865; 161 years ago
- Headquarters: Washington, D.C.
- Location(s): United States and Canada
- Members: 74,150 (2018)
- Key people: Timothy J. Driscoll
- Affiliations: AFL–CIO, CLC, NABTU
- Website: bacweb.org

The International Union of Bricklayers and Allied Craftworkers (BAC) is a labor union in the United States and Canada which represents bricklayers, restoration specialists, pointers/cleaners/caulkers, stonemasons, marble masons, cement masons, plasterers, tile setters, terrazzo mechanics, and tile, marble and terrazzo finishers. The union is an affiliate of the AFL–CIO and its Building and Construction Trades Department. It is also affiliated with the Canadian Labour Congress in Canada.

== History ==
The oldest continuously operating trade union in North America, BAC was founded in 1865 as the Bricklayers, Masons and Plasterers International Union of America (BMPIU). It was established during a great wave of blue-collar union formation in the 1860s. The organization has changed its name several times during its history to reflect its changing membership. In 1884 the name changed to Bricklayers and Masons International Union. In 1910 the name changed again to Bricklayers, Masons, and Plasterers International Union. In 1995 the union's name changed for the third and final time, renaming the union to International Union of Bricklayers and Allied Craftworkers (BAC). This last change changed "craftsmen" to "craftworkers."

The Union's first Canadian unions were chartered in Hamilton and Toronto, Ontario in 1881, making the union truly international.

BAC President Harry Bates played a major role in the merger of AFL and CIO in 1955, serving as Chair of the Unity Committee.

In 2000, the BAC created its "Canadian Congress" to give Canadian members a powerful, greater voice in union affairs.

James Boland, the 25th President of the International Union, took office in February 2010.

During his tenure the International and its affiliates have focused on creating coalitions with management partners and community groups to expand work prospects for BAC members and signatory contractors. Some of those initiatives include gaining preeminence in green building, strengthening members’ benefits through job-creating capital strategies, and developing customized education and training programs for design professionals, signatory contractors and craftworkers.

== Leadership ==
=== Executive board ===
BAC's Executive board is elected every five years by the delegates to the International Union's Convention.

- President: Timothy J. Driscoll
- Secretary-Treasurer: Robert Arnold
- Executive Vice President: Jeremiah Sullivan, Jr.

=== Presidents ===
1865: John A. White
1867: John S. Frost
1869: Samuel Gaul
1870: John O'Keefe
1871: Meredith Moore
1872: James T. Kirby
1874: Stephen A. Carr
1875: Lewis Carpenter
1877: Charles H. Rihl
1878: Lewis Carpenter
1879: Thomas R. Gockel
1881: E. J. O'Rourk
1882: Henry O. Cole
1884: John Pearson
1885: Thomas R. Gockel
1886: Alex Darragh
1890: Alfred J. McDonald
1891: John Heartz
1894: William Klein
1901: George G. Gubbins
1904: William J. Bowen
1928: George T. Thornton
1935: Harry C. Bates
1960: John J. Murphy
1966: Thomas F. Murphy
1979: Jack Joyce
1999: John J. Flynn
2010: Jim Boland
2020: Timothy J. Driscoll

== See also ==
- Bricklayers Hall

== General References ==
- International Union of Bricklayers and Allied Craftsmen, Local 16 (Schenectady, N.Y.) Records, 1886-1930. M.E. Grenander Department of Special Collections and Archives, University Libraries, University at Albany, State University of New York (hereafter referred to as the International Union of Bricklayers and Allied Craftsmen, Local 16 Records).
