= Barbara Easterling =

American labor unionist (1933–2026)

Secretary-Treasurer of the Communication Workers of America
- In office 1992–2008

Secretary-Treasurer of the AFL–CIO
- In office 1995–1995

President of the Alliance for Retired Americans
- In office 2009–2015

Personal details
- Born: July 23, 1933 Akron, Ohio, U.S.
- Died: October 29, 2026 (aged 93) Washington, D.C., U.S.
- Occupation: unionist; telephone operator

Barbara J. Easterling (July 23, 1933 – October 29, 2026) was an American labor unionist.

Easterling grew up in Akron, Ohio, becoming a telephone operator at Ohio Bell, and also joining the Communication Workers of America (CWA). She became a steward of her local, then its secretary and finally its vice-president.

In 1970, Easterling was appointed by John J. Gilligan as secretary of the Ohio Labor Division, in which role she drafted laws to protect women's rights at work, and restrict child labor. She stood down in 1973 to work full-time for the CWA, and in 1980 became assistant to its president, Glenn Watts. She was later elected as an executive vice-president of the union, and in 1992 as its secretary-treasurer.

In 1995, Easterling served as secretary-treasurer of the American Federation of Labor, the first woman to hold the post. However, before the end of the year, she returned to her role at the CWA. She also became president of the World Women's Committee of the Union Network International, and as a member of the Democratic National Committee.

Easterling retired from her union posts in 2008. In 2009, she was elected as president of the Alliance for Retired Americans.

She died after a long illness on October 29, 2026, in Washington, DC.

Trade union offices
Preceded by James E. Booe	Secretary-Treasurer of the Communication Workers of America; 1992–2008	Succeeded by Jeff Rechenbach
Preceded by Thomas R. Donahue	Secretary-Treasurer of the AFL–CIO; 1995	Succeeded by Richard Trumka
Non-profit organization positions
Preceded by George Kourpias	President of the Alliance for Retired Americans; 2009–2015	Succeeded by Robert Roach
