= Bricklayers Hall =

Historic building in Montgomery, Alabama

- U.S. National Register of Historic Places
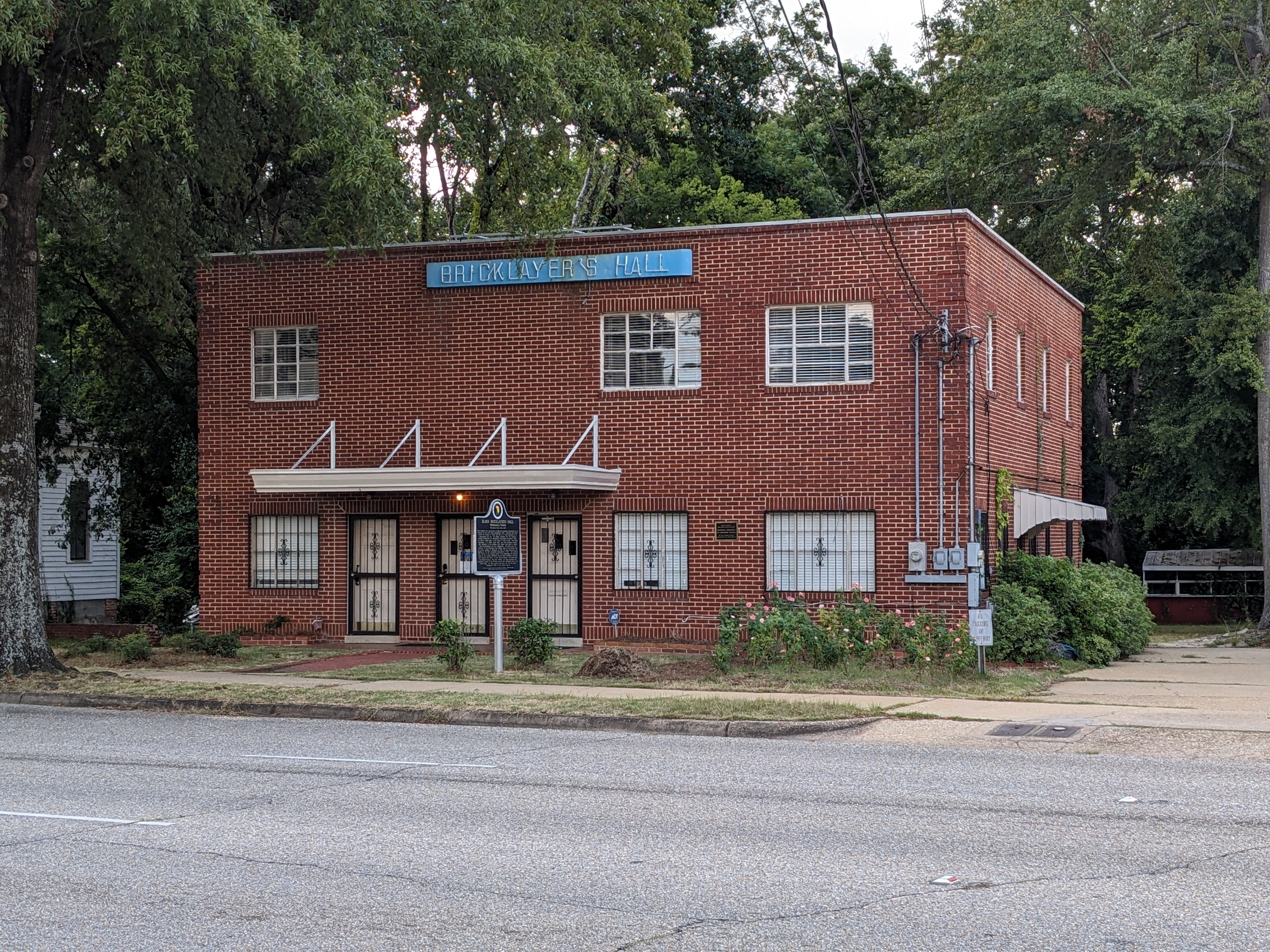

- Location within Alabama Location within the United States
- Location: 530 S. Union St., Montgomery, Alabama
- Coordinates: 32°22′17″N 86°17′59″W
- Built: 1954
- NRHP reference No.: 100005355
- Added to NRHP: July 23, 2020

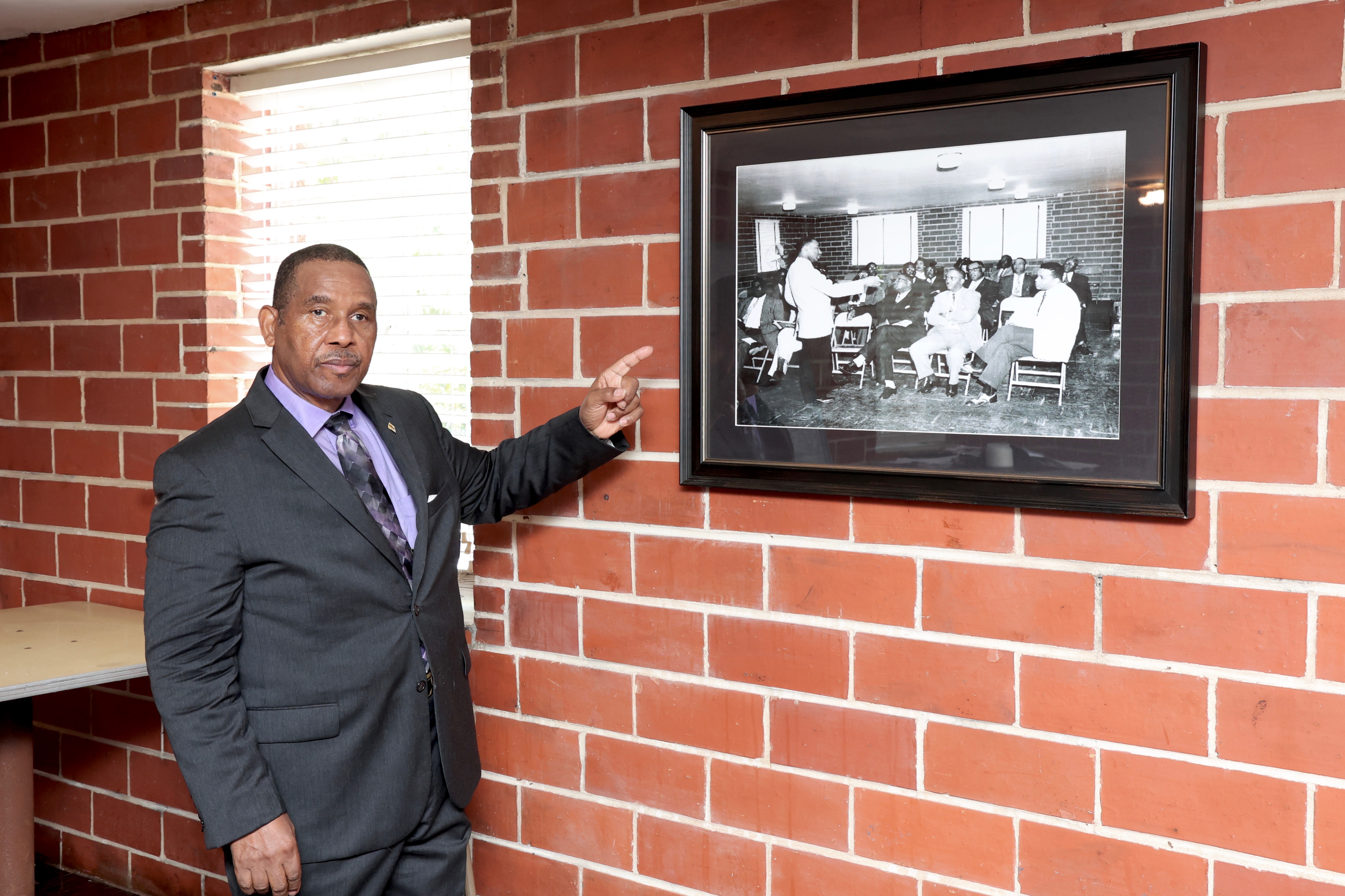
Front view at night of Bricklayer's Hall.

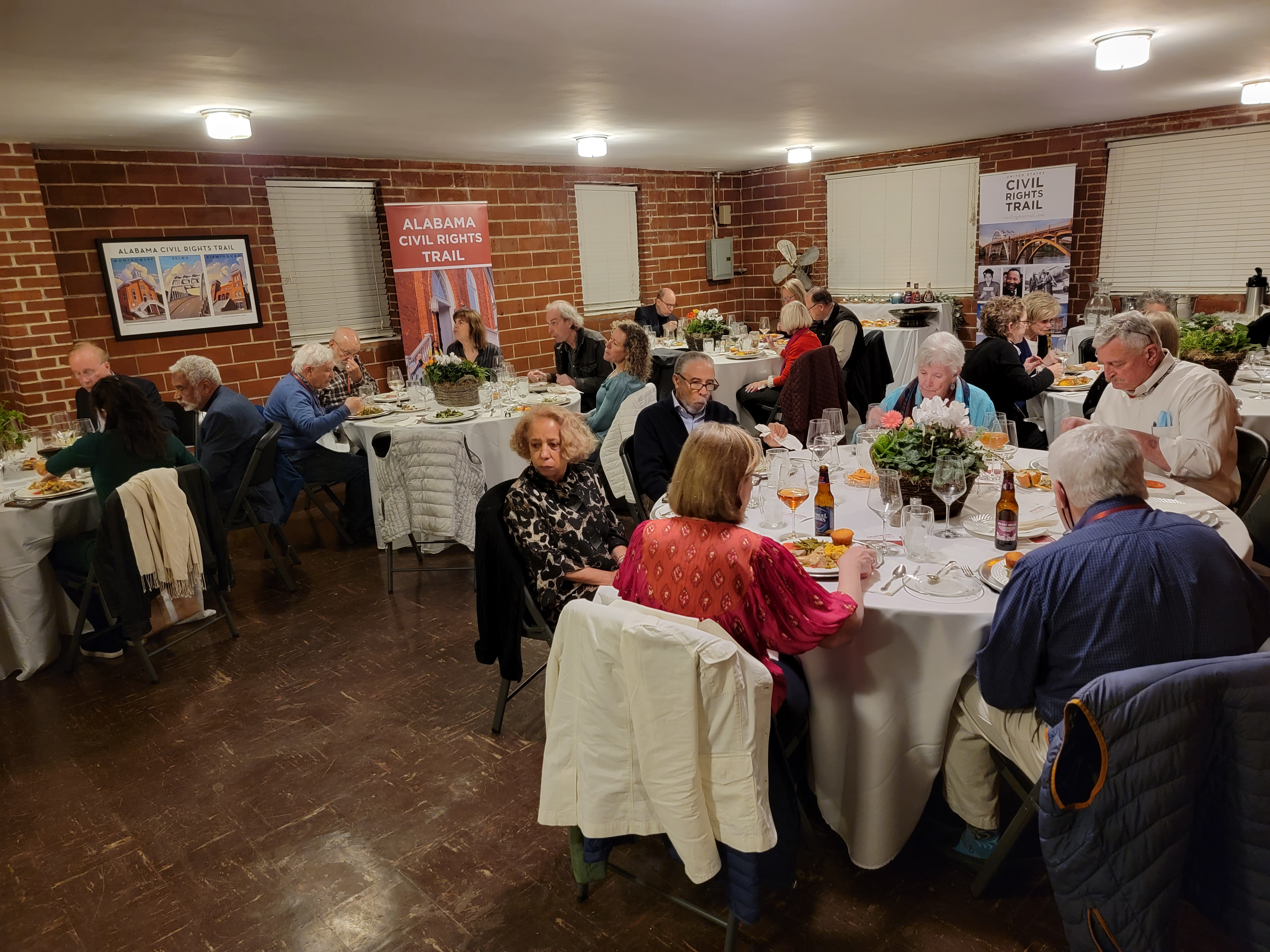
A group enjoys dinner as part of the US Civil Rights Trail event.

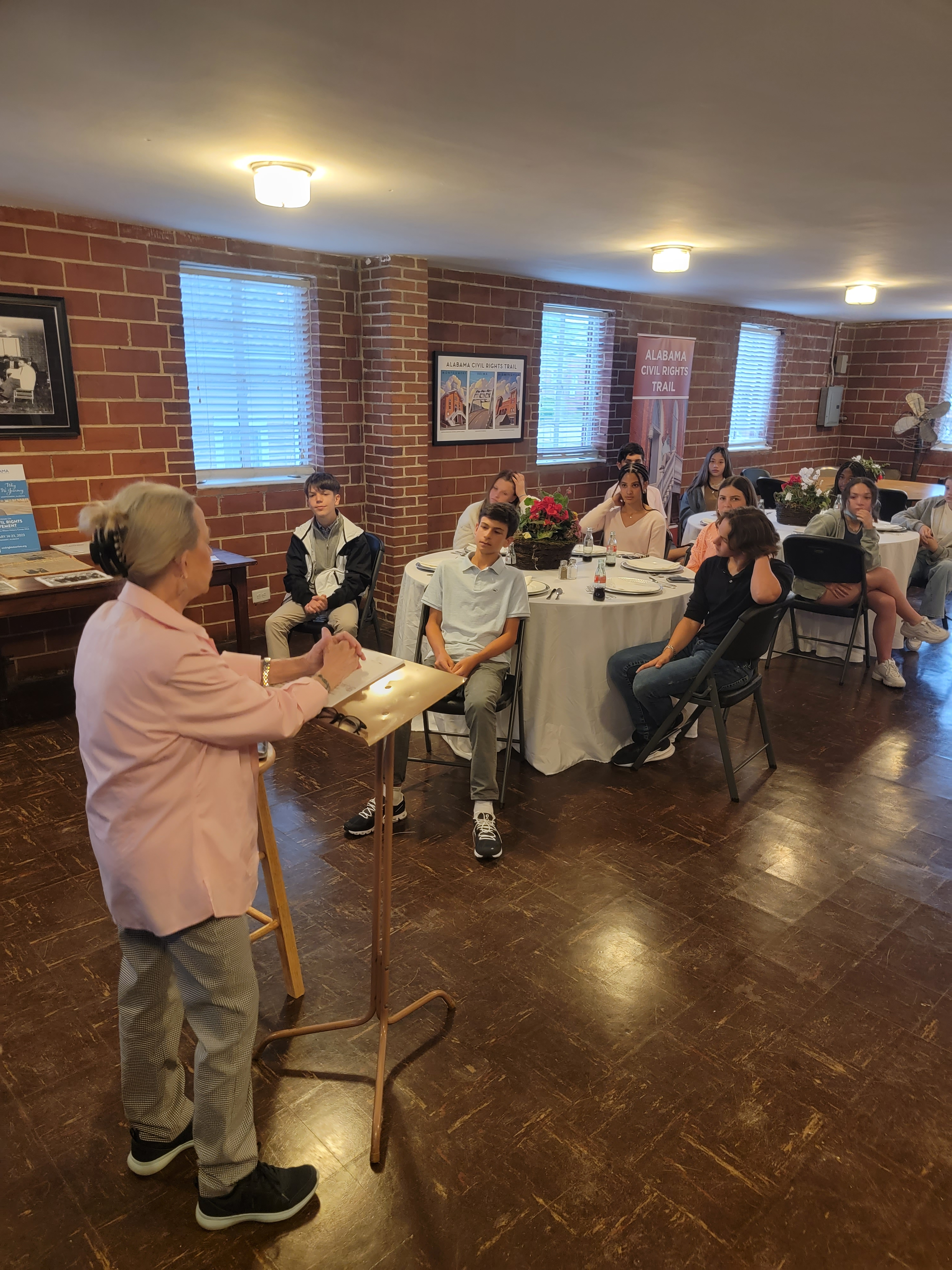
Peggy Wallace Kennedy speaking to students about the Civil Rights Movement at Bricklayer's Hall.

The Bricklayers Union Hall is a historic building in Montgomery, Alabama. Built in 1954, the two-story International Style building is constructed of clay tile with a brick veneer. There are separate entrances to three office units, and a neon sign reading "BRICKLAYERS HALL" near the cornice. The two first-floor suites were rented out, and the second floor, containing offices and a large meeting room, was used by the union.

The hall was built by the Bricklayers Union No. 3, which was a part of the International Union of Bricklayers, Masons, and Plasterers, and whose members were predominately Black. One of the offices was rented by the Montgomery Improvement Association (MIA), which was founded to organize the Montgomery Bus Boycott. The union secretary, Percy Doak, was a member of the Dexter Avenue Baptist Church, where MIA president Martin Luther King Jr. was pastor. The MIA moved to the building in February 1956 and remained there until 1960. In 1956, the building was used as the logistics and operations hub for the bus boycott. MIA rented the office space in unit C, while unit B (the upstairs meeting rooms/community room) was used for strategy sessions and meetings with local organizers, like Jo Ann Robinson, E.D. Nixon, Ralph Abernathy, and Fred Gray. After the MIA, civil rights attorney Charles Swinger Conley had his office in the building, while working on cases to desegregate interstate busses (following the Freedom Rides), public libraries, and juries, as well as on New York Times Co. v. Sullivan.

The building was listed on the National Register of Historic Places in 2020.

In 2023, the building was purchased by the non-profit group GirlTREK with plans to utilize the building as its Southern headquarters and field team. GirlTREK is an organization based on organizing community walking events as a way to heal intergenerational trauma, fight systemic racism and transform Black lives.

The Alabama Civil Rights Tourism Association (www.civilrightstourism.org) utilizes the 2nd floor and incorporates Civil Rights dinners and programs that engage in exposure to Civil Rights History at this significate site which played such a critical role in the African American struggle for equality and justice.
