= Andy Stern =

American labor leader

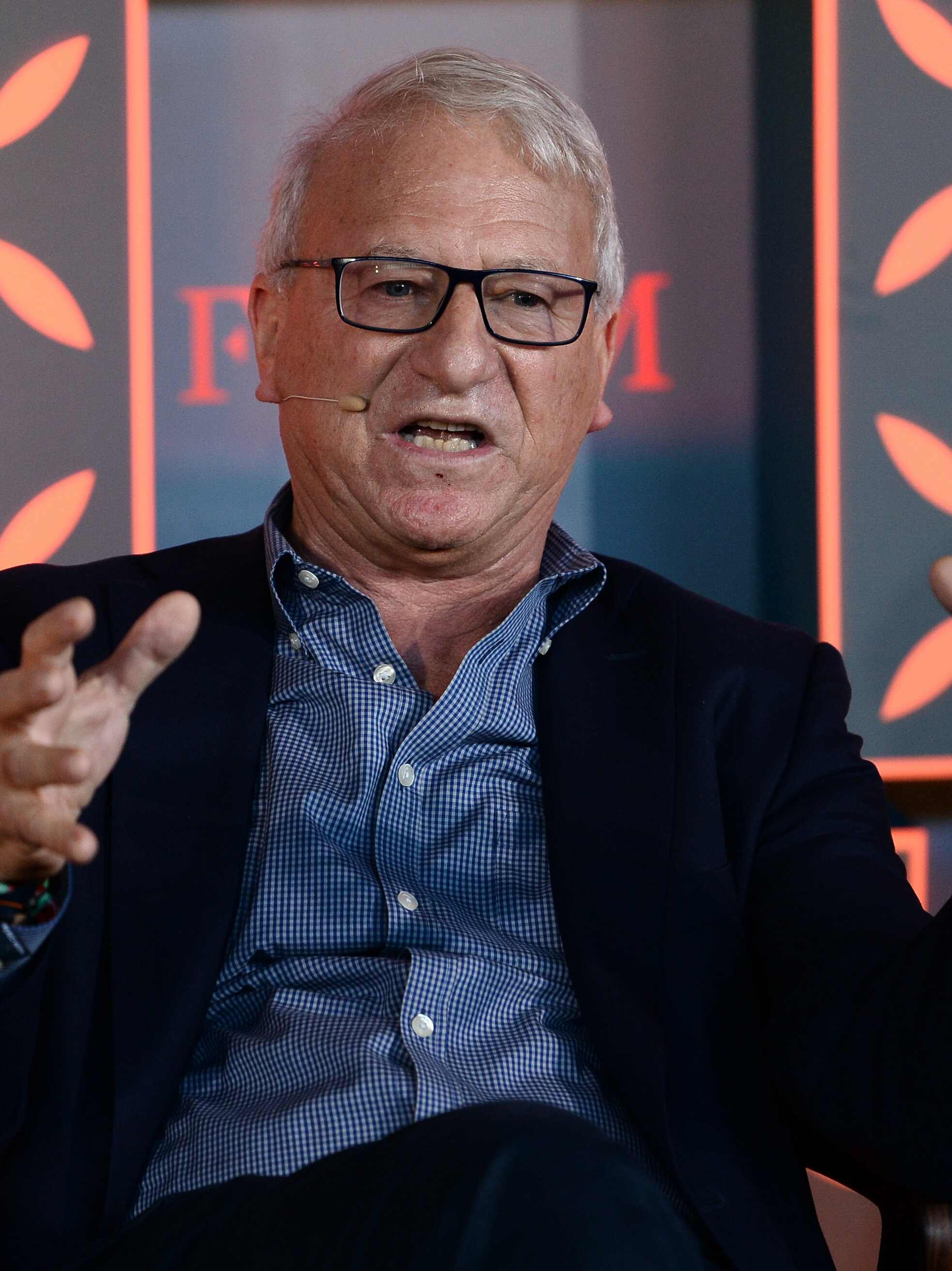
- Stern in 2017

President of the Service Employees International Union
- In office 1996–2010
- Preceded by: Richard Cordtz
- Succeeded by: Mary Kay Henry

Personal details
- Born: November 22, 1950 (age 75) West Orange, New Jersey, U.S.
- Party: Democratic
- Spouse(s): Jane Perkins (Divorced); Jennifer Johnson
- Children: 5
- Education: University of Pennsylvania (BA)

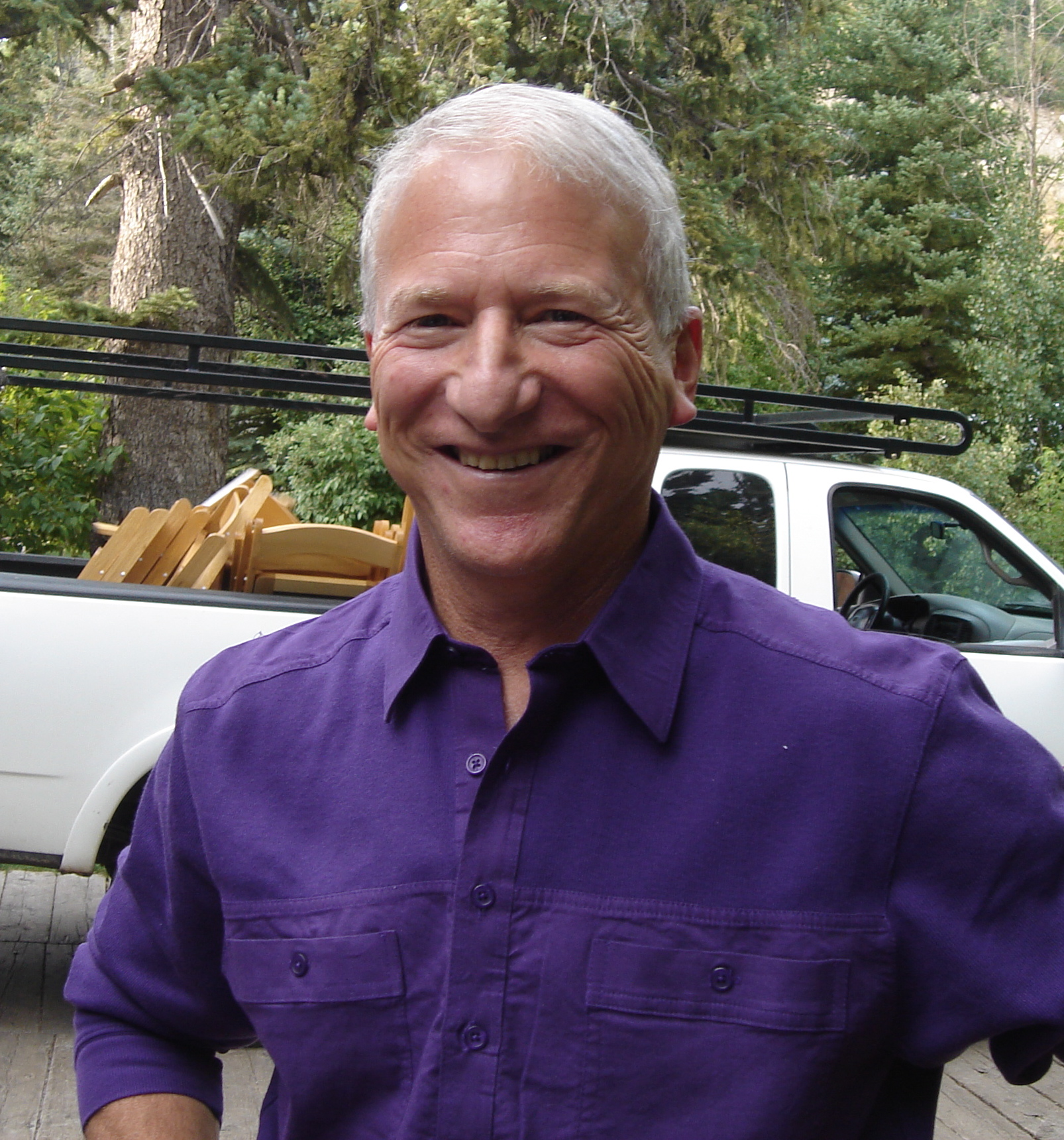
Stern in 2005

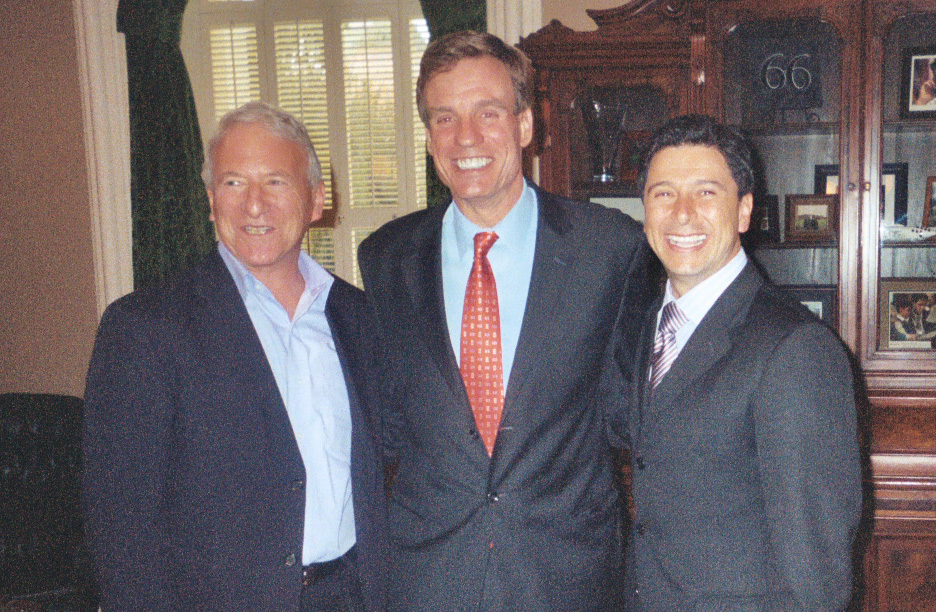
Stern (left) with Virginia Governor Mark Warner and California Assembly Speaker Fabian Núñez in 2006

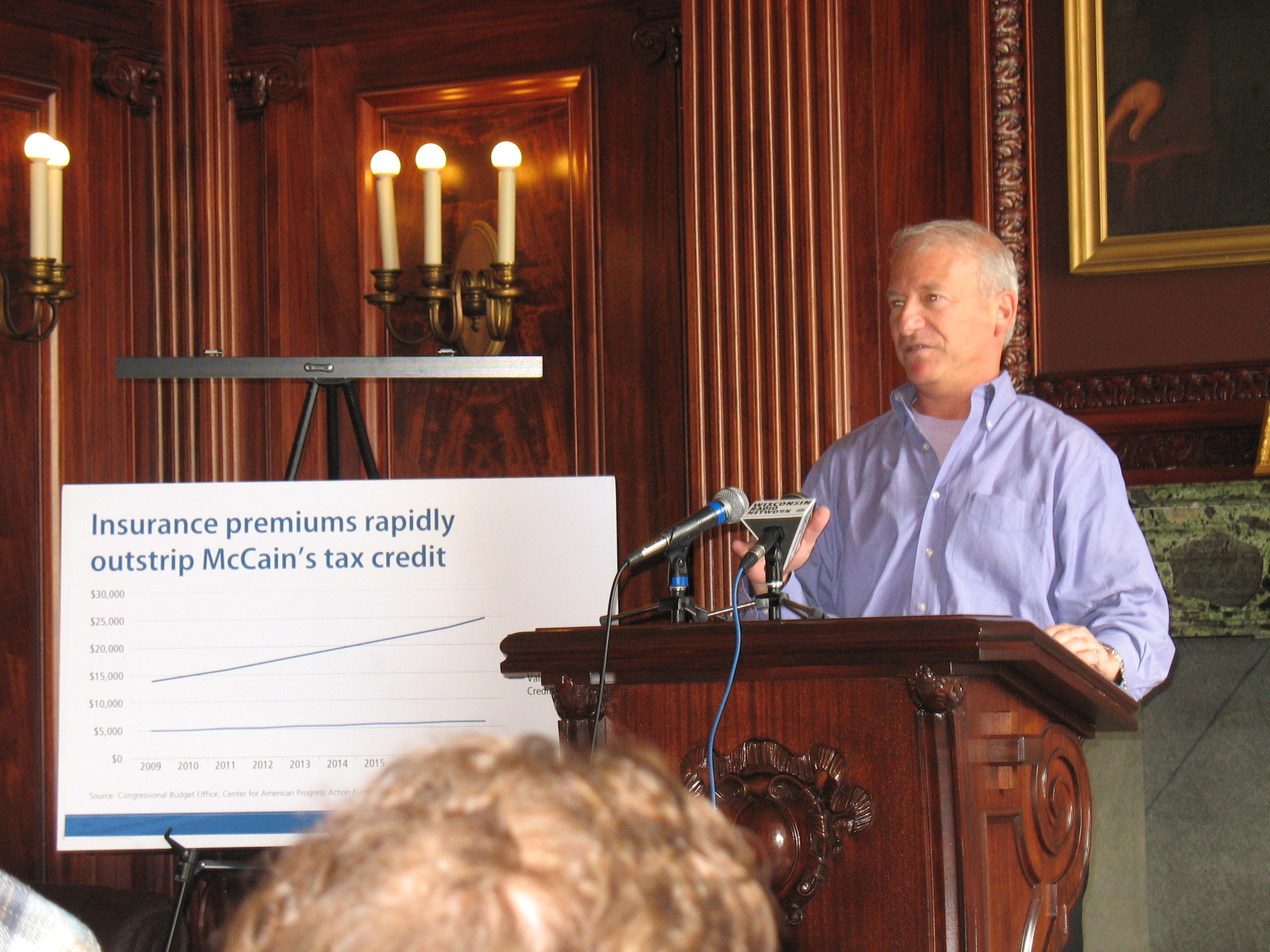
Stern in 2008

Andrew L. Stern (born November 22, 1950) is the former president of the Service Employees International Union, and now serves as its President Emeritus.

Stern has been a senior fellow at Georgetown University, Columbia University, and is now a Senior Fellow at the Economic Security Project.

He is the author of two books, A Country That Works (2006), and Raising the Floor: How a Universal Basic Income Can Renew Our Economy and Rebuild the American Dream (2016).

== Early life and career ==
Andy Stern grew up in West Orange, New Jersey, where his father was a lawyer and his mother worked both at home and in healthcare. Stern graduated from West Orange High School in 1968. He began college as a business major at the University of Pennsylvania's Wharton School of Business, but ultimately graduated in 1971 with a BA in education and urban planning. Stern began his career as a welfare caseworker and member of the SEIU Local 668 in 1973, eventually being elected president in 1977 of his Pennsylvania local. In 1980, he was elected to SEIU’s International Executive Board, as the youngest member in its history, and in 1984 the union's then-president John Sweeney put him in charge of SEIU’s organizing efforts.

=== SEIU President ===
In 1996, Stern was elected to the presidency of the union in a hotly contested election. He led a major restructuring of the union to spending nearly 50% of its resources on organizing. In 1999 SEIU won the largest union election since 1935 for 74,000 LA home care workers. By 2000 SEIU had become the largest union in the AFL-CIO, and the fastest growing union in the world. It launched major North American campaigns “Justice for Janitors”, “Stand for Security”, “There’s No Place Like Home”, and set up offices around the world to lead transnational global accountability efforts for Sodexo, Securitas, and ISS. As a result of these efforts, SEIU grew 1,200,000 members under his leadership.

Stern was both a progressive and practical labor leader as Al Hunt profiled in his WSJ column, "He (Stern) is a powerhouse in the labor movement and American politics, and one of a new breed of labor leaders determined to energize the movement." The Washington Business Journal profile was headlined "Militant but pragmatic labor leader wants a vibrant D.C."

After launching a national debate aimed at uniting the nine out of ten American workers who have no organization at work, SEIU, along with the Teamsters, announced on July 25, 2005 that they were disaffiliating from the AFL-CIO. Stern led SEIU out of the AFL-CIO and founded Change to Win, a six-million-member federation of seven major unions "dedicated to giving workers a voice at their jobs."

=== Political Influence ===
During the years of Stern's leadership, the SEIU became the largest political action committee in the United States, and funneled vast amounts of financing to the Democratic Party and its candidates, far outnumbering the contributions of other unions during his last two election cycles. SEIU contributed $65 million to the 2004 presidential campaign of John Kerry. In 2008 SEIU sponsored with the Center for American Progress (CAP), the first Presidential election forum, on health care, and required all candidates seeking the union's endorsement to “Walk A Day In My Shoes” including Senator Barack Obama as a home care worker Hillary Clinton as a nurse, and Joe Biden as a school maintenance worker, and have a plan for universal healthcare. The union spent another $85 million on Democratic candidates in 2008; $60 million going toward the election of President Barack Obama, with a significant chunk of that money funding door-to-door canvassing and other GOTV efforts, as well as voter registration.

Stern along with Harold Ickes, Ellen Malcolm, Steve Rosenthal, and George Soros, and other activists founded and funded America Coming Together (ACT) the largest independent expenditure in history at that time for grassroots organizing in an effort to defeat the re-election of President George Bush.

Stern has been the most frequent visitor to the White House since Obama's election. Between Inauguration Day and February 23, 2011, Stern visited the White House 53 times.

And SEIU's political organizing and advocacy changed the lives of workers in state after state. As Harold Meyerson wrote in the LA Times, "Andy Stern has arguably been the most influential non-Californian in the affairs of California in the past 15 years...Stern has shaped the state’s politics and much of its economy."

=== Healthcare ===
Stern is referred to as one of "the chief architects of healthcare reform" in Modern Healthcare magazine, ranking in the top 10 of the 100 Most Powerful People in Healthcare. SEIU participated in over 12 coalitions with business leaders, labor and advocates, hosted the first Presidential primary in 2008 on healthcare, and after President Obama's election created a war room with over 100 staff in the states advocating until the successful completion of the legislative process. Stern has been named to Modern Healthcare's annual "movers and shakers in healthcare" list for five years in a row. SEIU poured millions into a group called Health Care for America NOW!, which, at times, fought strongly for universal healthcare including single payer. Stern was an ardent supporter of the American Recovery and Reinvestment Act of 2009.

=== Media and Internet ===
Stern embraced political organizing via the Internet in the wake of the Howard Dean campaign, which his union endorsed.

Through Stern's initiative, a New Media team was formed at SEIU in the late summer of 2008, the first major union to enter the digital age. The union's website was completely redesigned and relaunched shortly thereafter.

In fall of 2005, he launched an online contest called Since Sliced Bread that awarded $100,000 for the best new economic ideas in America. Since 2005, Stern had been a contributing blogger at The Huffington Post.

Stern has been a key figure in financing the online grassroots "netroots" community, along with Dean, George Soros, Simon Rosenberg, and Andrew S. Rappaport, to funnel a progressive agenda to liberal bloggers.

Stern appeared on the covers of The New York Times Magazine, Fortune and Business Week, featured on CBS 60 Minutes, on Fox as the Power Player of the Week, CNN, and the Washington Post. He talks about his career and philosophy on the podcast The Great Battlefield.

=== Controversy ===
"He's arguably the most important labor leader we've had in a long time: aggressive and controversial," says Philip Dine, an authority on labor issues and author of the recent book State of the Unions. On January 27, 2009, SEIU placed UHW West under trusteeship and dismissed 70 of the local's executives, including president Sal Rosselli. Rosselli and other ousted leaders reformed under the National Union of Healthcare Workers and pushed for UHW West members at 60 facilities to vote to decertify SEIU. SEIU filed a lawsuit in mid-2009 alleging that UHW West and NUHW officials embezzled millions of dollars. In 2009 Former Labor Secretary Ray Marshall issued a report, "Acting as hearing officer, Mr. Marshall found that the local's president, Sal Rosselli, and other union officials had improperly transferred union money to a nonprofit group to use in a feud with the parent union. Mr. Marshall also concluded that the local had wrongly hidden $500,000 from the parent union by placing the money into a lawyer's trust account." On March 26, 2013, the United States Court of Appeals for the Ninth Circuit affirmed the District Court ruling that a jury awarded, "... individual judgments ranged from $31,400 to $77,850, and NUHW was assessed damages of $724,000".

=== Resignation ===
Stern announced on April 13, 2010, that he would be stepping down as president of the SEIU. “There is a time to learn, a time to lead, and then there's a time to leave. And shortly it will be my time to retire...and end my SEIU journey,” Stern wrote on April 14, 2010. Health care employers, often at odds with SEIU, begrudgingly wrote, "Regardless of how you feel about Andy Stern, president of the 2.2 million-member Service Employees International Union, there is no denying that he is the most important labor leader of his generation." In response to question of why Stern has left at the height of his success Marick F. Masters, director of the Fraser Center for Workplace Issues and Labor at Wayne State University in Detroit, said... "He had the presence of mind to leave when he is at the top rather than to stay longer,"

=== Post SEIU Affiliations and Activities ===
SEIU honored Stern with the title of President Emeritus in 2010.

Stern was a senior fellow at the Georgetown Public Policy Institute from 2010 to 2011. From 2011 to 2016, he served as a Senior Fellow at the Richard Paul Richman Center for Business Law and Public Policy at Columbia University.

He is currently a Senior Fellow at the Economic Security Project. Stern has served on many non-profit Boards including the Open Society Foundations, the Hillman Foundation, and Broad Foundation, and works with many non-profits and unions on worker organizing.

== Written works ==
A Country That Works (Free Press), Stern calls for unions to be the dominant vehicles for the promotion of social reforms, including espousing the benefits of increased taxation on the wealthy and universal health care. On October 3, 2006, he appeared on The Colbert Report to promote his new book A Country That Works. On October 4, he appeared on Democracy Now! to promote the book.

In 2016, Stern authored a book with Lee Kravitz entitled Raising the Floor, discussed his exploration into the future of work and jobs leading to his leadership on providing cash, and a guaranteed income for all Americans. Stern's book and conversations helped spark Andrew Yang’s candidacy for President promoting his platform of creating a universal basic income. With other organizers Stern assisted in the founding of the Economic Security Project, and serves on the board of the Income Movement. Stern was an early organizer for cash benefits and a guaranteed income which led to the passage of the Child Tax Credit as well as setting the stage for an increasing number of local experiments, as well as the American Recovery Act’s cash stimulus payments.

== Publications ==
- Why Professors Need to Learn to Teach. Stern, Andy with Goldstein, Matt Former Chancellor of CUNY. (2016)
- Medicaid Waiver. Stern, Andy and Eli Lehrer R Street. (2016, October scheduled)
- As a Solution to Labor Law Modernization. Andy Stern. MIT Technology Review on Response to David Freedman on UBI (2016)
- Why we should give every adult $1,000/month for free. Andy Stern CNBC Commentary (2016)
- Current Debate Shows Need for Pro-American Trade Policy. Andy Stern Huffington Post (2016)
- Labor Needs New Business Model. Andy Stern Medium (2013)
- Andy Stern: Raimondo right to use investment tools. Andy Stern. Providence Journal. (2013)
- Build Bridges, Not Fortresses. Andy Stern and Raynor, Bruce. Democracy: A Journal of Ideas. (2013)
- ‘Inclusive Capitalism: Bridging the Business- Labor Divide. Milikowski, Nathan and Andy Stern. Reuters. (2013)
- Why We Need to Raise the Minimum Wage. Andy Stern and Camden, Carl. LA Times. (2013)
- Don’t Push Hospital Clinics Over the Cliff. Andy Stern. The Huffington Post. (2012)
- New Programs, Wage Laws Pave a Path Forward. Honda, Michael and Andy Stern. USA Today. (2012)
- Teachers Deserve this ‘Thank You’. Broad, Eli and Andy Stern. The Huffington Post. (2012)
- The Infrastructure and Retirement Imperatives. Andy Stern. WSJ. (2012)
- A Great Day for America. Andy Stern. The Daily Caller. (2012)
- Will the Supreme Court Eat My Healthcare Too?. Andy Stern. The Huffington Post. (2012)
- The German Example. Andy Stern. Business Insider. (2011)
- China’s Superior Economic Model. Andy Stern. WSJ. (2011)
- Bring Home Foreign Earnings. Andy Stern. Politico. (2011)
- A Letter to Grover Norquist. Andy Stern. The Daily Caller. (2011)
- American Idle. Andy Stern. The Huffington Post. (2011)
- A Valentine’s Day Message: From Russia With Love. Andy Stern. The Huffington Post. (2011)
- The Third Economic Revolution—Boom or Bust for America?. Andy Stern. The Huffington Post. (2011)
- Moving Big Donors Out of Politics. Andy Stern and Mark McKinnon. Politico. (2010)
- A Path Forward: It's Time to Pass Health Insurance Reform. Andy Stern. Huffington Post. (2010)
- Healthcare Must be Within Our Reach. Andy Stern and the Rev. Dr. George Cummings. The Hill. (2010)
- Don’t Kill the Bill: Fix It. Andy Stern. The New Republic. (2009)
- Why Healthcare Can't Wait. Andy Stern and Jeff Kindle CEO Pfizer. Huffington Post. (2009)
- Main Street, Not Wall Street, Should Fix Crumbling Infrastructure. Andy Stern and Gov. Kathleen Sebelius. Christian Science Monitor. (2008)

== Personal life ==
Stern is divorced from Jane Perkins, a former head of the environmental network Friends of the Earth. They had two children, Matt and Cassie. Cassie died in 2002. In 2017, Stern married Jennifer Johnson, a former Communications Director for the Center for Food Action in northern NJ, and the mother of Claire, Alex, and Isabel Beckenstein.

Trade union offices
Preceded by Richard Cordtz	President of the Service Employees International Union; 1996–2010	Succeeded by Mary Kay Henry
