= Tim Driscoll (unionist) =

American labor union leader

Timothy J. Driscoll is an American labor union leader.

Born in Massachusetts, Driscoll became a bricklayer, and joined the International Union of Bricklayers and Allied Craftworkers in 1985. In 1993, he moved to Washington, D.C., and continued his career there. He began working full-time for the union in 1995, initially in the government relations department, and then as assistant to the president. He became Director of Trade Jurisdiction in 1999, and then Executive Vice President in 2010. In 2016, he became secretary-treasurer of the union.

Driscoll was elected as president of the union in 2020, also becoming a vice-president of the AFL-CIO.

Trade union offices
Preceded by Henry Kramer	Secretary-Treasurer of the International Union of Bricklayers and Allied Craftworkers; 2016–2020	Succeeded by Robert Arnold
Preceded by Jim Boland	President of the International Union of Bricklayers and Allied Craftworkers; 2020–present	Succeeded by Incumbent
