= Lane Kirkland =

American politician (1922–1999)

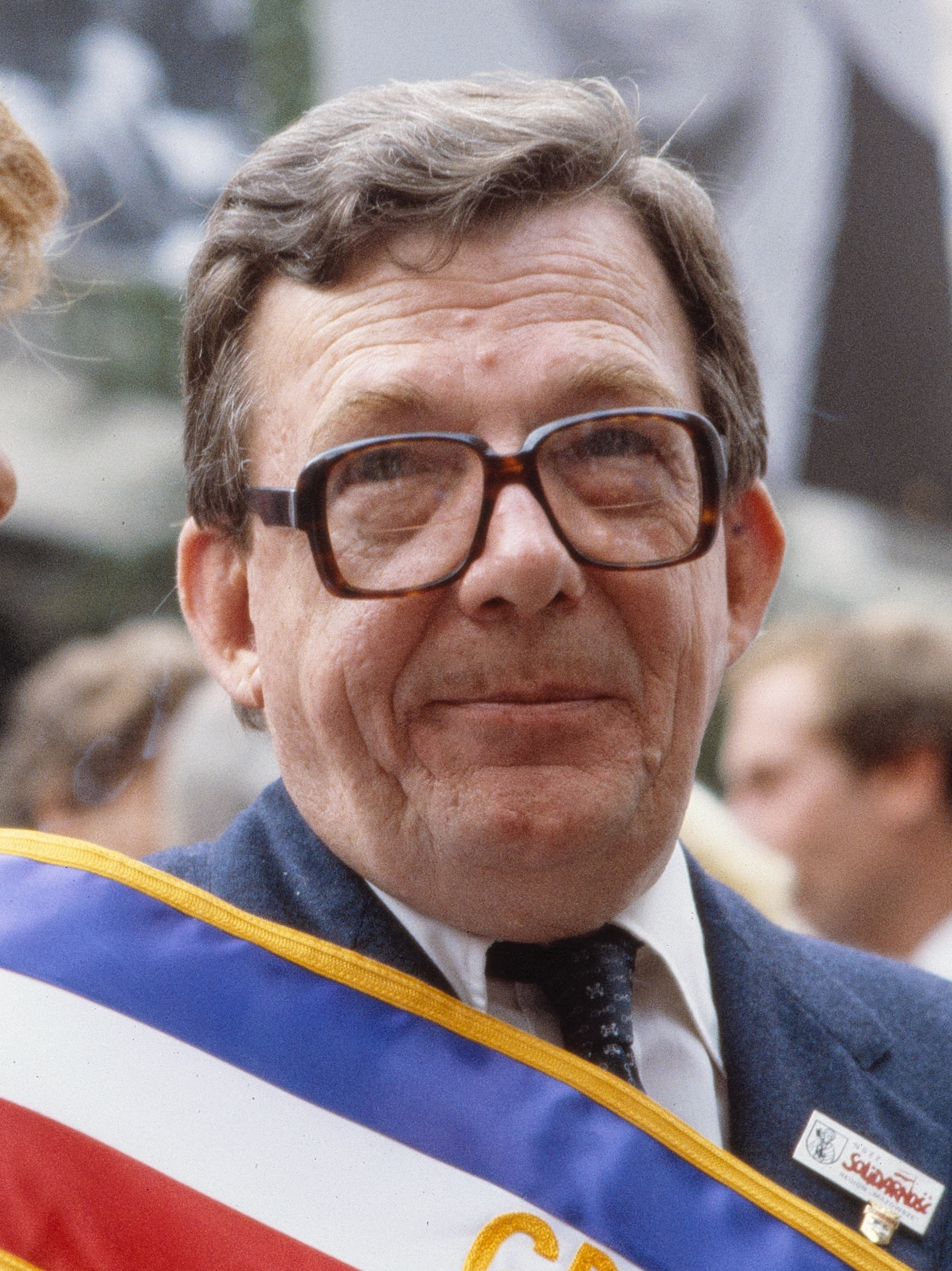
- Kirkland in 1981

2nd President of the AFL–CIO
- In office November 19, 1979 – August 1, 1995
- Preceded by: George Meany
- Succeeded by: Thomas R. Donahue

2nd Secretary-Treasurer of the AFL–CIO
- In office 1969–1979
- Preceded by: William F. Schnitzler
- Succeeded by: Thomas R. Donahue

Personal details
- Born: Joseph Lane Kirkland; March 12, 1922 Camden, South Carolina, U.S
- Died: August 14, 1999 (aged 77) Washington, D.C., U.S.
- Party: Democratic
- Occupation: Labor leader

Joseph Lane Kirkland (March 12, 1922 – August 14, 1999) was an American labor union leader who served as President of the AFL–CIO from 1979 to 1995.

== Early life ==
Kirkland was born in Camden, South Carolina, the son of Louise Beardsley (Richardson) and Randolph Withers Kirkland. He rose over his career to head the 16-million-member American labor movement.

In 1941, Kirkland entered the United States Merchant Marine Academy, graduated 1942, and became a deck officer on U.S. merchant ships during World War II. After the war, he worked in the Research Department of the AFL. He received a B.S. degree from the Edmund A. Walsh School of Foreign Service at Georgetown University.

Kirkland married Edith Draper Hollyday in June 1944, with whom he had five daughters.

A year after their divorce in 1972, he married the Prague-born Irena Neumann (1925–2007). An Auschwitz survivor, Neumann had previously been married to film producer Henry T. Weinstein, who had directed Marilyn Monroe's final unfinished picture. The couple had been close to Monroe during the last months of her life.

== Career ==
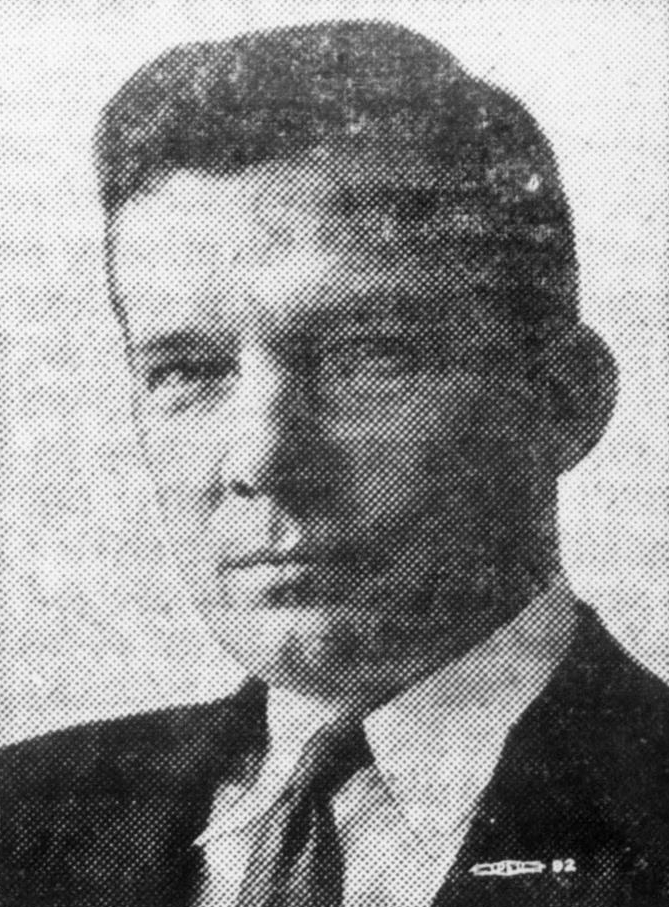
Kirkland c. 1960

From 1979 to 1995 Kirkland was president of the American Federation of Labor – Congress of Industrial Organizations (AFL–CIO). During his tenure, union membership in the United States declined precipitously. The unions suffered some of their most serious defeats, including the 1981 air traffic controllers' strike and the 1985–1986 Hormel strike. He also served on the Federal Prison Industries, Incorporated (FPI) board from 1980-1988, representing Labor during FPI's growth years.

On the international front, Kirkland's support of the Solidarity movement in Poland contributed to the decline of communism. American Unions under the leadership of Lane Kirkland contributed $150,000 shortly after the successful Solidarity Strike, as early as September 1980. The total support Kirkland raised for to the Solidarity movement, taking into cash and equipment, was more than $6,000,000. At the time, the Carter Administration, including its two prominent Polish Americans, Zbigniew Brzezinski and Edmund Muskie, advised against such aid, fearing Soviet reaction. Kirkland nevertheless continued, persuading Zbigniew Brzezinski of the wisdom of supporting the Solidarity movement. In the U.S., labor union support for Solidarity far exceeded the support given by its European counterparts. Aid to Solidarity was part of Lane Kirkland's internationalist vision for the labor movement and the building of the global consensus on human rights.

After the dissolution of the Soviet Union, Kirkland became a mentor for many prominent labor leaders who saw him as a visionary and visited him in his office at the George Meany Center. He befriended Lech Wałęsa as well as Marian Krzaklewski who replaced Lech Wałęsa at the helm of Solidarity. Kirkland was awarded posthumously with the highest Polish award, the Order of the White Eagle. The Polish American Freedom Foundation established a grant in Lane Kirkland's honor, and his union, the International Organization of Masters, Mates and Pilots, established the non-profit Captain Richard Phillips-Lane Kirkland Maritime Trust partly in his memory.

== Death and legacy ==
Lane Kirkland died in Washington, D.C. on August 14, 1999, aged 77, from complications of cancer.

His best remembered quotation is:

If hard work were such a wonderful thing, surely the rich would have kept it all to themselves.

== Awards ==
On November 13, 1989, Kirkland was presented with the Presidential Citizens Medal by President Bush.

In 1994, Kirkland was awarded the Presidential Medal of Freedom by President Clinton.

In 1999, Lane Kirkland was awarded the Truman-Reagan Medal of Freedom.

== Notes ==
Trade union offices
| Preceded by William F. Schnitzler | Secretary-Treasurer of the AFL–CIO; 1969–1979 | Succeeded by Thomas R. Donahue |
| Preceded by George Meany | President of the AFL–CIO; 1979–1995 | Succeeded by Thomas R. Donahue |
| Preceded by John T. Joyce | AFL-CIO delegate to the Trades Union Congress; 1987 | Succeeded by John DeConcini |
