= Jim Boland (unionist) =

Irish-American labor union leader

James Boland is a retired Irish-born, American labor union leader.

Born in Ireland, Boland attended University College Dublin. He emigrated to the United States in 1970 and settled in San Francisco, where he worked laying bricks, stone and marble, and joined the International Union of Bricklayers and Allied Craftworkers. He was elected as business agent of his local union, and then in 1992 as its president. His next role was assistant to the vice-president for operations of the international union, and then in 1999 he was elected as secretary-treasurer.

In 2010, Boland was elected as president of the union, and also became a vice-president of the AFL-CIO. He was presented with the Eugene V. Debs Award in 2015. He retired in 2020.

Trade union offices
Preceded by John J. Flynn	Secretary-Treasurer of the International Union of Bricklayers and Allied Craftworkers; 1999–2010	Succeeded by Henry Kramer
Preceded by John J. Flynn	President of the International Union of Bricklayers and Allied Craftworkers; 2010–2020	Succeeded by Tim Driscoll
Awards
Preceded by Sara Horowitz	Winner of the Eugene V. Debs Award; 2015	Succeeded by Cindy Sheehan
