= Thomas Kennedy (unionist) =

American politician

Thomas Leo Kennedy
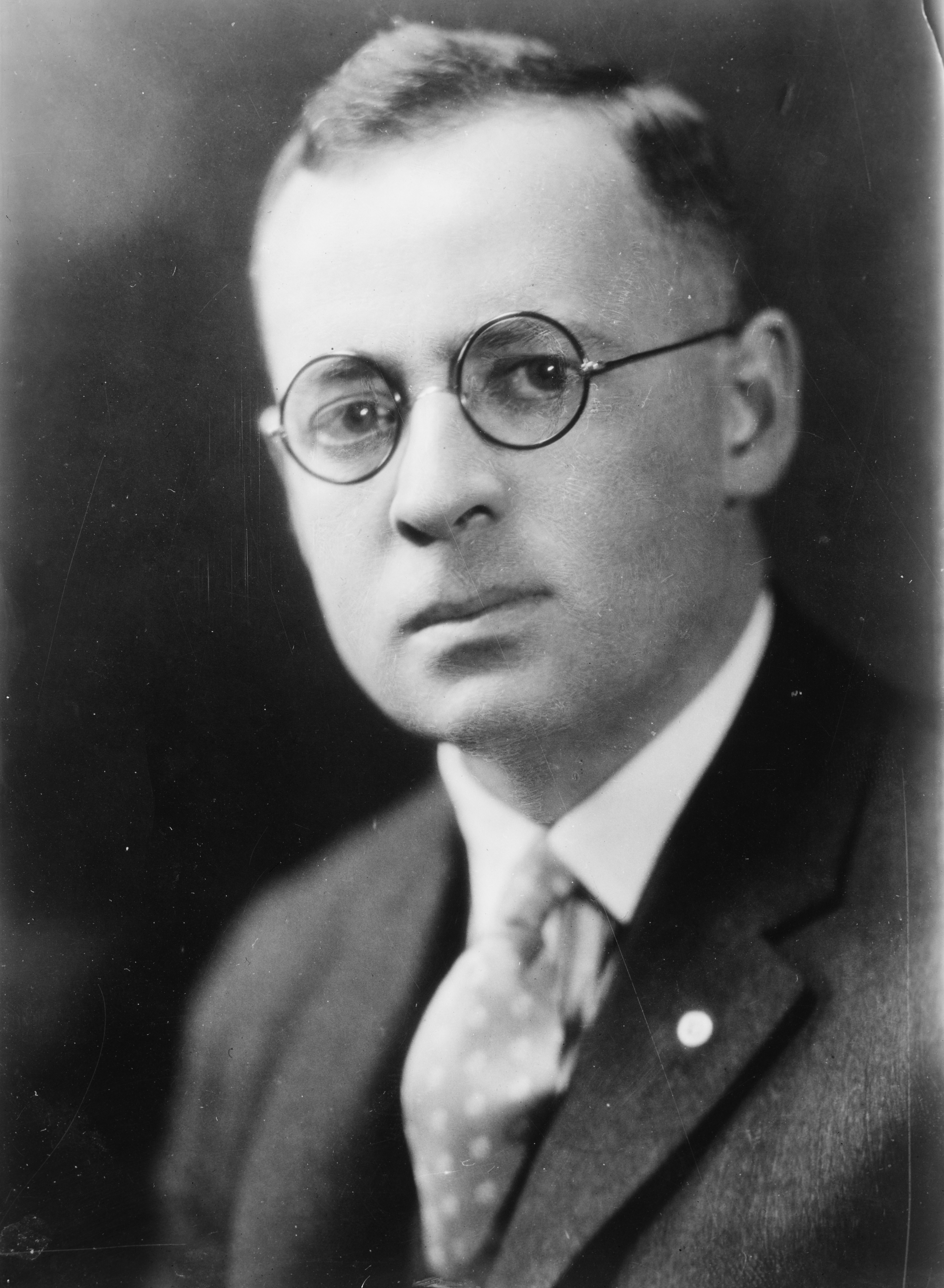
- Kennedy c. 1922

16th Lieutenant Governor of Pennsylvania
- In office January 15, 1935 – January 17, 1939
- Governor: George Earle
- Preceded by: Edward Shannon
- Succeeded by: Samuel Lewis

10th President of the United Mine Workers
- In office January 15, 1960 – January 19, 1963
- Preceded by: John L. Lewis
- Succeeded by: William Anthony Boyle

Personal details
- Born: November 2, 1887 Lansford, Pennsylvania, U.S.
- Died: January 10, 1963 (aged 75) Hazelton, Pennsylvania, U.S.
- Party: Democratic
- Profession: Miner, Labor leader, Politician

Thomas Kennedy (November 2, 1887 – January 19, 1963) was a miner and president of the United Mine Workers of America (UMWA) from 1960 to 1963.

== Formative years ==
Born on November 2, 1887, in Lansford, Pennsylvania, Kennedy started work in the mines at the age of twelve, breaking large chunks of coal into smaller pieces. He joined the United Mine Workers of America in 1900, and was elected secretary of its Local 1738 in 1903.

== Career ==
Kennedy was subsequently elected to the District 7 board of the Mine Workers union in 1908, and as District 7 president in 1910; he served until 1925. During this time, he was UMWA's chief negotiator for contracts with Anthracite coal mine owners.

In 1925, he was elected UMWA's secretary-treasurer. He left that position when he was elected as an international vice president in 1947. During his tenure as a UMWA vice president, he led the battle to convince the American Federation of Labor to embrace social insurance and unemployment insurance.

He was elected lieutenant governor of Pennsylvania in 1934, becoming the first Democrat to hold the office since Chauncey Black left office in 1887. He ran for governor four years later, but was defeated when the state Democratic political machine decided not to support him.

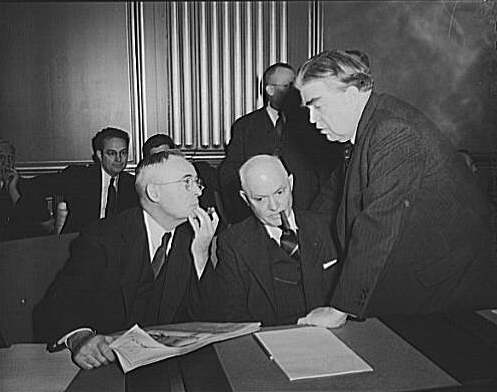
John Lewis (right, President of the United Mine Workers (UMW), confers with Thomas Kennedy (left), secretary-treasurer of the UMW, and Pery Tetlow (center), president of UMW District 17, at the War Labor Board conference of January 15, 1943, discussing the anthracite coal miners' strike

Kennedy was appointed to the National Defense Mediation Board in 1941, but resigned in protest later that year after the board ruled against UMWA in the "captive mines" case. He was re-appointed in 1942, but resigned again when the board issued its "Little Steel" organizing decision.

After Lewis' retirement in 1960, Kennedy was elected president of the union. Although Lewis favored W. A. Boyle as his successor, Kennedy was well liked and well known. Kennedy was in failing health, however, and Boyle took over many of the president's duties.

== Illness and death ==
In November 1962, Kennedy became too ill to continue his duties and Boyle was named acting president. Kennedy died on January 19, 1963, in Hazleton, Pennsylvania, and Boyle was elected president as his successor.

Trade union offices
Preceded by William Green	Secretary-Treasurer of the United Mine Workers of America; 1924–1947	Succeeded by John Owens
Preceded by William C. Doherty; George Meany	American Federation of Labor delegate to the Trades Union Congress; 1946; With: Edward J. Brown	Succeeded by George J. Richardson; Arnold Zander
Preceded by John O'Leary	Vice-President of the United Mine Workers of America; 1947–1960	Succeeded by W. A. Boyle
Preceded by John Lewis	President of the United Mine Workers of America; 1960–1963	Succeeded by W. A. Boyle
Political offices
Preceded by Edward Shannon	Lieutenant Governor of Pennsylvania; 1935–1939	Succeeded by Samuel Lewis
Party political offices
Preceded by Guy Bard	Democratic nominee for Lieutenant Governor of Pennsylvania; 1934	Succeeded by Leo Mundy
