= Edward J. Brown (unionist) =

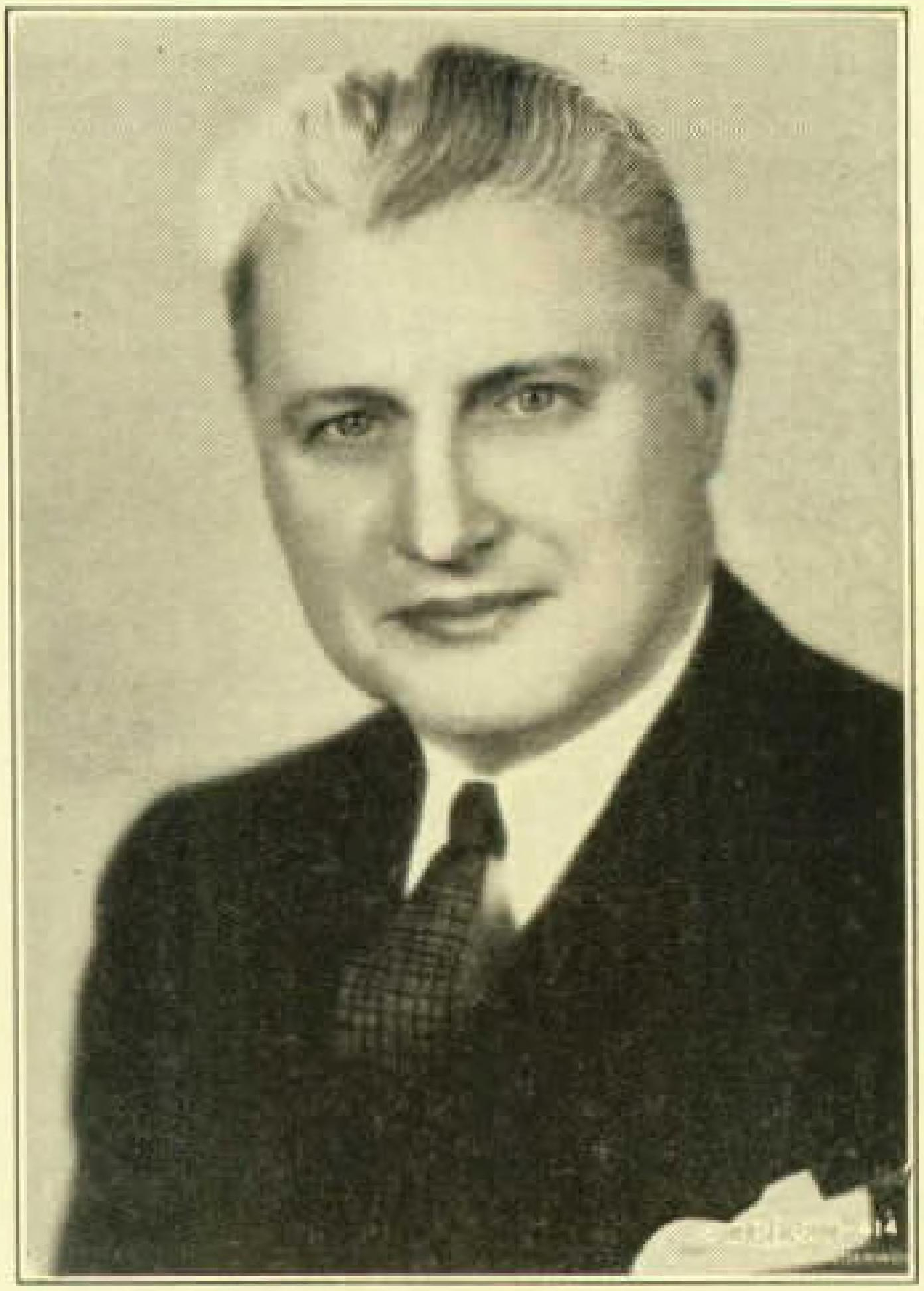
- Brown c. 1941

President of the International Brotherhood of Electrical Workers
- In office 1940–1946
- Preceded by: Daniel W. Tracy
- Succeeded by: Daniel W. Tracy

Personal details
- Born: November 20, 1893 Chicago, Illinois, U.S.
- Died: January 31, 1950 (aged 56)
- Occupation: Labor union leader

Edward J. Brown (November 20, 1893 – January 31, 1950) was an American labor union leader.

Born in Chicago, Illinois, Brown completed an apprenticeship as an electrician, and found work for a telephone company. In 1916, he joined the International Brotherhood of Electrical Workers (IBEW). From 1926, he was chief electrician for Robert White & Co., and during this period, he completed an LLB degree with the Chicago Law School.

In 1930, Brown began working full-time for IBEW, in which role he successfully organized electricians in Milwaukee. He was elected to the executive of IBEW in 1937. In 1940, the union's president, Daniel W. Tracy, resigned, and Brown was appointed to the post, being confirmed when he won an election the following year.

As a union leader, Brown served on the American Federation of Labor's international labor relations committee. During World War II, he served on the National Defense Mediation Board. In 1946, he was defeated for re-election by Tracy. He became the business manager of the union's Wisconsin local. Still, the union's new leadership claimed that he had destroyed records, and that money had gone missing. As a result, he was expelled from the union.

Over the next few years, Brown set up a law practice in Wisconsin and Washington D.C., and also worked as a consultant to the Fuqua Insurance Company. He died in 1950.

Trade union offices
Preceded by Daniel W. Tracy	President of the International Brotherhood of Electrical Workers; 1940–1946	Succeeded by Daniel W. Tracy
Preceded by William C. Doherty; George Meany	American Federation of Labor delegate to the Trades Union Congress; 1946; With: Thomas Kennedy	Succeeded by George J. Richardson; Arnold Zander
