= David Sullivan (labor leader) =

American trade unionist

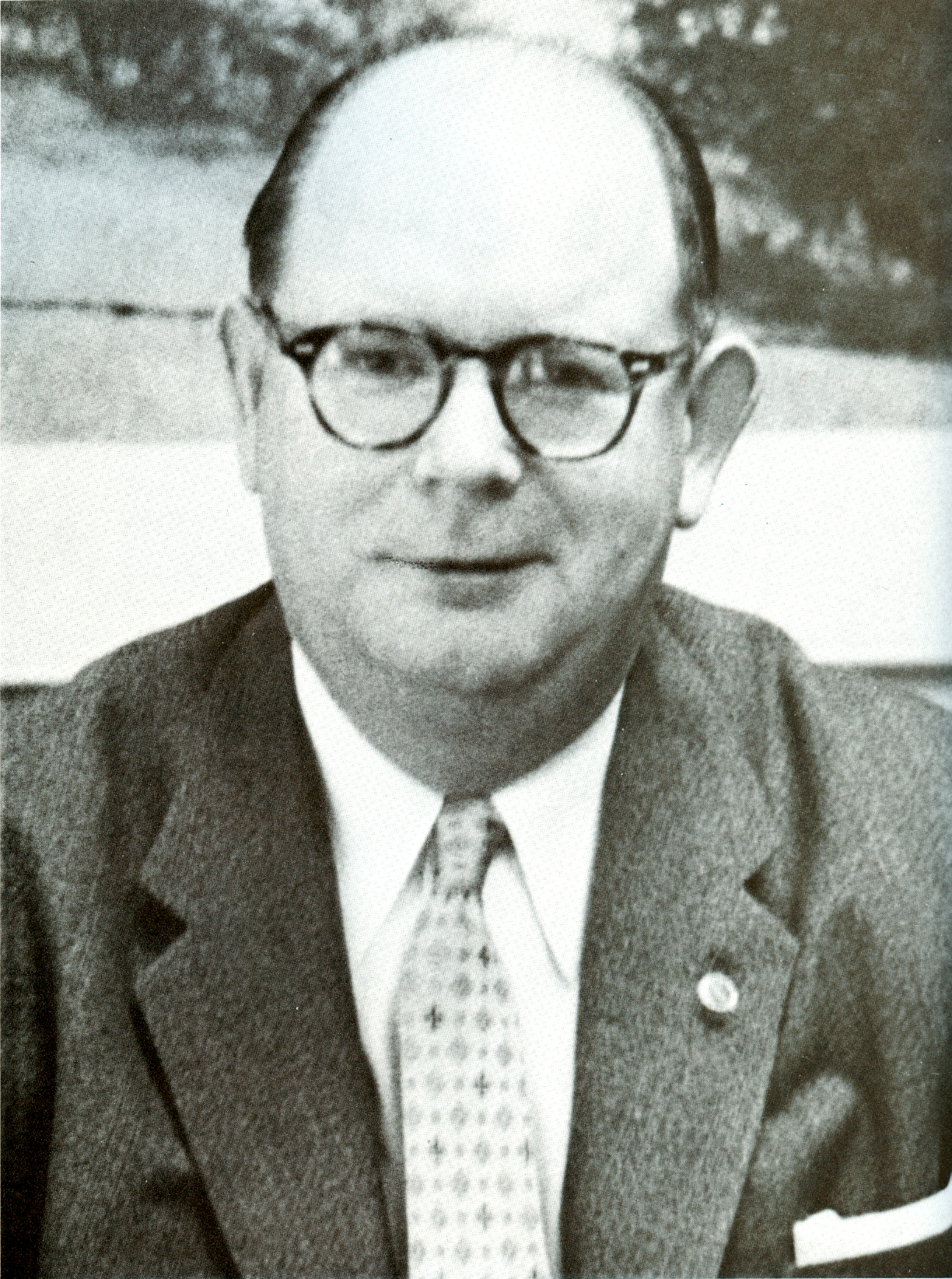
- David Sullivan, photographed as president of Local 32B
- Born: 7 May 1904; Cork, Ireland
- Died: 23 January 1976 (aged 71); Flushing, Queens, New York
- Occupation: Union leader
- Spouse: Kathleen (Connaire) Sullivan
- Children: Five children
- Parent(s): Stephen and Margaret (Fouhy) O'Sullivan

David Sullivan (May 7, 1904 – January 23, 1976) was an American labor leader and president of the Building Service Employees International Union (BSEIU), the precursor to the Service Employees International Union, from 1960 to 1971.

== Early life ==
Sullivan was born in Cork, Ireland, on May 7, 1904, to Stephen and Margaret (Fouhy) O'Sullivan. He attended public school, but abandoned his education during high school. His brother Michael was a member of the Cork First Battalion of the IRA and was shot dead along with five other IRA Volunteers by British Crown Forces during the Irish War of Independence on 23 March 1921. David O'Sullivan and his brother Thomas emigrated to the United States in 1925, settling in New York City. Sullivan became a naturalized citizen in 1932. In 1930, Sullivan married the former Kathleen Connaire. The couple had five children.

== Rise within Local 32B ==
Shortly after arriving in New York City, Sullivan took a job as an elevator operator. On April 19, 1934, BSEIU Local 32B was founded under the leadership of James Bambrick, who would become its first president. Sullivan became a charter member of the new union, and participated in strikes in 1934 and 1935.

Sullivan allied himself with George Scalise, president of a small BSEIU local of window washers and the international union's representative for the East Coast. When BSEIU president Jerry Horan died in April 1937, Scalise was elected BSEIU president with the assistance of the Chicago mob and Luciano crime family mobster Anthony Carfano. Scalise used his office to gain control over Local 32B and in 1938 engineered Sullivan's election as secretary-treasurer. Sullivan and another officer stuffed the ballot box to ensure victory. In 1940, Scalise was convicted of bribery, embezzlement and labor racketeering, and imprisoned. Local 1 president William McFetridge was elected BSEIU president. Despite Sullivan's close relationship with Scalise, President McFetridge voiced total confidence in Sullivan's honesty.

On April 25, 1941, Local 32B President James Bambrick admitted that he had stolen $10,000 in union funds. Although Bambrick accused Sullivan of being the real leader of the union (through his ties to Scalise), Sullivan adamantly denied any wrongdoing. Bambrick resigned as union president, and Sullivan succeeded him as interim president on June 19, 1941. Sullivan won a full term as president on September 18.

Bambrick's charges, however, led to lengthy disputes between the international and Sullivan. Beginning in 1941, BSEIU President McFetridge attempted to repeatedly "try" Sullivan before various union bodies, but was rebuffed numerous times by state and federal courts. Sullivan was elected a BSEIU international vice-president in 1941, and by 1945 had solidified his power in the union. Sullivan's position on the international union's executive board eventually led McFetridge to end efforts to oust Sullivan. In part, Sullivan's stronger political position resulted from his union's growing membership: Local 32B now had more than 36,000 members in 5,000 office buildings and 22 department stores.

== SEIU presidency ==
Sullivan was elected president of the BSEIU on May 5, 1960, after McFetridge retired. Local 32B had grown to 37,500 members, while BSEIU had about 275,000 members.

McFetridge did not, however, retire quietly. He returned to his home local in Chicago and was elected the local's president. He also refused to give up his seat on the AFL-CIO executive council. McFetridge continued to assert effective control over BSEIU from afar, challenging Sullivan's decisions, interfering with his choices for staff and elected positions, and undercutting his policy choices. McFetridge was an advocate of the Marina City mixed-use development in Chicago, which he believed would provide numerous jobs for his members. McFetridge asked that BSEIU invest pension funds in the development, a plan which Sullivan opposed. Although he won BSEIU backing for the Marina City development, McFetridge lost control of BSEIU to Sullivan thereafter. McFetridge retired from the union in 1964, leaving Sullivan in unchallenged control.

BSEIU grew to 40,000 members during Sullivan's first four-year term in office. In 1968, the international union dropped the word "Building" from its title, adopting its current name.

Despite McFetridge's retirement as Local 1 president, he signaled that he wanted to retain his position on the AFL-CIO executive council. For much of 1965, Sullivan lobbied AFL-CIO president George Meany and other union leaders to dump McFetridge. But media attention to the average age of executive council members probably contributed more to McFetridge's retirement from the federation council. Sullivan was elected an AFL-CIO vice-president on December 14, 1965.

== Retirement and death ==
Age, declining health and a changing SEIU membership led Sullivan to retire in 1971. The union had grown by 70% during his presidency, to 467,000 members. Large numbers of SEIU members were public sector or health care workers. A number of younger, more activist leaders whose bases of support lay in these two groups were challenging Sullivan for leadership. Sullivan retired, and California public sector labor leader George Hardy was elected his successor. Sullivan retired from the AFL-CIO effective as of the federation's fall convention.

After his retirement, Sullivan lived in Flushing, Queens, New York. He died there at Booth Memorial Hospital on January 23, 1976, at the age of 71.

== Notes ==
Trade union offices
Preceded by William McFetridge	President of the Service Employees International Union; 1960-1971	Succeeded by George Hardy
Preceded by Anthony J. DeAndrade; William J. Farson	AFL-CIO delegate to the Trades Union Congress; 1964; With: Max Greenberg	Succeeded by John J. Grogan; John H. Lyons, Jr.
