= George Hardy (trade unionist) =

Canadian-American labor leader (1911–1990)

7th President of the Service Employees International Union
- In office 1971–1980
- Preceded by: David Sullivan
- Succeeded by: John Sweeney

Personal details
- Born: December 15, 1911 North Vancouver, British Columbia, Canada
- Died: September 13, 1990 (aged 78) San Francisco, California, U.S.
- Spouse(s): Norma Mitchell Hardy (d. 1965), Cissy Hardy (d. 1990)
- Children: 2
- Occupation: Union leader

George Hardy (December 15, 1911 – September 13, 1990) was a Canadian-American labour leader who was president of the Service Employees International Union (SEIU) from 1971 to 1980. At the time of his death, SEIU had grown to become the fifth-largest affiliate of the AFL-CIO. Hardy was a vice president of the AFL-CIO from 1972 to 1980, and a member of its executive council. He was a former member of the Democratic National Committee and the California Democratic State Central Committee.

== Early life and union career ==
Hardy was born to Charles and Bertha (Fitchett) Hardy on December 15, 1911, in North Vancouver, British Columbia, Canada. The Hardys moved to San Francisco, California, in the 1920s. Hardy and his family came to San Francisco from Canada working their way as migrant fruit pickers. George grew up on Linden Street in the working class Hayes Valley district of San Francisco. living next door to the Cheney Family. George married Norma Mitchell in San Francisco and had two children, Joan Marie Hardy and Robert Thomas Hardy. Robert was killed in a car accident in 1955 at the age of 18, returning from a high school graduation trip to Arizona. George credited Norma, the Mitchell Sisters (Rene Cheney d.1975, Lottie Andre d.1975 and Edna Peralta d.1988), best friend Ellis Cheney and so many "anonymous" janitors for the support and collaboration which fuelled his great success and the growth of BSEIU (later SEIU) on the West Coast and throughout North America.

=== 1926 to 1942 ===
George's father, Charles (also known as "Pop"), was a janitor, and George became one, too. Pop Hardy joined Theater Janitors Local 9 of the Building Service Employees International Union (BSEIU) in 1926, and soon became an unpaid organizer for the union. Pop Hardy soon was elected president of the local as well as an International Vice President. Although the BSEIU was dominated by organized crime at the time, Charles Hardy was generally considered honest and a figurehead who was not part of the mob's inner circle on the board. In 1932, George Hardy also joined Local 9, the oldest Building Service Employees International Union local in California. The year he joined, he was elected the local's business agent. During the San Francisco General Strike of 1934, Hardy helped his father to organize service workers to support the strike, leading to the closure of restaurants, movie theatres, night clubs, and office buildings during the four-day strike.

George Hardy began working as a janitor at the main branch of the San Francisco Public Library in 1935. One night, a foreman dropped a match behind a radiator; when Hardy missed it, he was fired. Angry at the pettiness and mistreatment, Hardy, his father and other Irish janitors formed a new local for office building janitors, Local 87. George Hardy became an organizer for the new union in 1936. Hardy worked by day, and by night (often not sleeping for several days) he organized workers into the new union. Repeatedly fired for his off-hours union work, Hardy was blacklisted. Under future leaders such as Herman Eimers Rex Kennedy, and Robert Parr, members of Local 87 continued to enjoy improved wages, benefits and working conditions. These victories were all won with very few strikes.

Nonetheless, within seven years Hardy had organized a majority of the city's janitors. Hardy formed a group known as the "Hayes Valley Gang"—neighbourhood friends who were also blacklisted janitors and union organizers—who travelled helped organize building workers in San Francisco and then travelled to Los Angeles to build several small locals. By 1943, Hardy had organized BSEIU locals from San Francisco to San Diego. Hardy's efforts at organizing were helped by the international union's quick growth and increasing strength. BSEIU's national membership was almost 100,000 in 1945, and reached more than 200,000 by 1950. Hardy moved to Los Angeles in 1946, and the union's organizing efforts (strongly backed by the International Brotherhood of Teamsters) took off in the city under his leadership: Three locals with just 2,800 members blossomed into eight locals with more than 8,500 members. By 1950, Hardy boasted that so many workers had been organized in Los Angeles (including a third of the city's large office buildings) that the union had obtained 40 percent wage hikes in the past four years. Local 399 had 5,000 members in 1950 and 11,000 in 1960—making it the second largest local in the national BSEIU. Hardy pressed for, and the union was successful at, the transformation of part-time jobs into full-time positions. Health benefits and pension were also added to most union contracts.

Hardy also began to expand the union's base. By 1960, over a third of the members in Los Angeles worked in the public sector. The union also expanded out of office buildings, and represented workers in bowling alleys, supermarkets, hotels, apartment buildings, gymnasiums, clubs, public schools, and hospitals. Hardy expanded the union's racial and ethnic diversity as well. By 1950, half of the members in Local 399 (the largest in Los Angeles) were African American, and 9 percent were Mexican American. Overall, 38 percent of BSEIU members in Los Angeles were black.

Hardy also made several important innovations in union structure and operations. First, he united all BSEIU locals in the state into a new California State Council, the first statewide coordinated body in SEIU history. Second, he built an extensive communications network of bulletins, mailings, newsletters and updates (all run out of the BSEIU office at 240 Golden Gate Avenue in San Francisco) which not only kept the local unions in touch with one another but also helped create a politically powerful union as well.

The strong union which Hardy built also drew attention from organized crime. When mob leaders tried to take over Local 87 in the late 1930s, Hardy and other leaders threatened them with baseball bats and refused to grant them entry to the union's property.

=== 1943 to 1971 ===
Hardy served with the United States Army in the European Theater of Operations from 1943 to 1946.

After his discharge from the Army in 1946, Hardy returned to Los Angeles and was elected president of BSEIU Local 399. Two years later, after the death of his father opened a position on the BSEIU international executive board, Hardy was elected an international vice president of the union. In 1950, he also established the SEIU Western Conference, the first interstate conference of councils and locals within the international union. The same year he undertook major organizing campaigns again among public employees and expanded the union's membership drive to include health care workers. He also began affiliating many small, independent unions to help bolster his membership numbers. To support the organizing effort, Hardy established a large research department at the California State Council and within his home local to conduct investigations into employer businesses. Hardy also pushed BSEIU locals under his control to hire researchers as business agents and local union officers. Hardy also built large member education and training divisions in many locals.

The member education divisions not only educated members about how unions work, but also served to boost Hardy's political efforts. George Hardy despised Republicans and labour leaders who supported them. From the late 1950s and through the 1960s, Hardy and the BSEIU locals in California became much more active politically. All of his support went toward liberal Democrats. During these years he set up a committee of labour union leaders to support Democrats and wean labour leaders away from the Republican Party.

The move into health care was particularly risky. The National Labor Relations Act (NLRA) of 1935 originally included health care workers from the protection of federal labour law, but the Taft-Hartley Act amendments exempted workers employed by non-profit health care organizations from the law in 1947. Since nearly all health care organizations at the time were non-profit, this effectively excluded the vast majority of health care workers from federal labour law. In 1962, Congress passed legislation allowing workers in health care institutions owned by the federal government to engage in collective bargaining. Publicly owned hospitals were covered by the NLRA in 1967, and non-profit nursing homes in 1970. Congress amended the Taft-Hartley Act in 1974 to bring non-profit hospitals back under the NLRA's coverage. BSEIU had organized its first hospital workers in San Francisco in the 1930s. Hardy's push into health care proceeded very slowly. Nationwide, only 2.3 percent of all health care institutions had a union in 1970. Despite a sharp upturn in the number of dismissals of health care workers for union activity in the 1950s and 1960s, Hardy had organized one of the largest pockets of unionized health care workers outside New York City by the late 1960s.

By the time Hardy was elected SEIU president in 1971, SEIU's fastest-growing areas of membership were in health care and public employment. Under his leadership, SEIU's membership in California had grown to more than 105,000.

In 1955, Robert Thomas Hardy, George's 18-year-old son, died in an automobile accident. George Hardy had been grooming his son to take over leadership of Local 399 and the California State Council. The death of his son affected Hardy very deeply, and led him to associate with younger people for the rest of his life. most notably Phillip Burton (later Congressman), Timothy J. Twomey (SEIU Local 250 and International VP), Jim Zellers (SEIU Local 399) and Sal Rosselli (SEIU-UHW).

== SEIU presidency ==
David Sullivan, the 66-year-old president of SEIU (it had dropped the "Building" in 1968), retired at the union's convention in the fall of 1971. A number of younger, more activist leaders whose bases of support lay in the health care and public sector divisions of the union had challenged Sullivan for leadership, and he retired rather than seek re-election. Sixty-year-old George Hardy was elected his successor. He was elected a vice president of the AFL-CIO in 1972, and elected to the labour federation's executive council at the same time. Hardy chafed under Meany's leadership, and in 1979 he publicly criticized Meany for not doing enough to organize workers into unions.

Under Hardy, SEIU's health care and public employee divisions saw rapid growth. SEIU added 42,000 members in 1972 alone, and had grown by a surprising 100,000 members by the end of 1975. During his tenure, SEIU grew to 935,000 members and became the fifth-largest affiliate in the AFL-CIO. As part of his organizing effort, Hardy started a special program in 1972 to hire college-educated interns and turn them into negotiators and international union representatives. In 1972, Hardy engaged in an abortive attempt to form the first national policeman's union. In 1975, the union organized its first local union of physicians, an action which allowed SEIU to become the largest doctors' union in the U.S. by the turn of the century. Much of the membership growth, however, came through affiliation rather than new member organizing. Hardy viewed the fast-growing American Federation of State, County and Municipal Employees (AFSCME) as SEIU's chief competitor. AFSCME had grown from a mere 100,000 members in 1951 to 500,000 members in 1972, and had elected a dynamic and aggressive new leader, 45-year-old Jerry Wurf, in 1964. Not only was AFSCME's growth substantial, its demographics matched those of SEIU's: At least two-thirds of the rival union's members were blue-collar workers, and a fifth of them worked in hospitals and nursing homes. To counter AFSCME's rapid growth, Hardy adopted a strategy of affiliating existing members rather than organizing unorganized workers. Between 1971 and 1980, SEIU affiliated 22 independent unions. Merger and affiliation accounted for 230,000 new members from 1971 to 1985, and virtually all of the union's growth from 1980 to 1984.

=== Battle with CSEA ===
Another of the union's major growth spurts came in 1979, when it raided the Civil Service Employees Association (CSEA). In existence since 1910, CSEA had won representation rights for New York State's 140,000 public employees after the state passed a public employee collective bargaining law in 1968. Structured like an association rather than a union, CSEA hesitated to engage in militant labor action or strike, and yet it had a rocky relationship with the state: The union struck for two days at the beginning of April 1972 and won a 5.5 percent pay hike. But the strike and dissatisfaction with CSEA's leadership led some CSEA members to ask for representation by SEIU. With Hardy's strong backing, the union was able to gather enough signatures on petitions to trigger a vote in two of the four units where workers were represented by CSEA, but SEIU lost the vote by a 3-to-1 margin in December 1972. A second strike planned by CSEA leaders was called off after delegates overwhelmingly repudiated a strike resolution supported by the union's leaders. The internal strife led SEIU to once again challenge CSEA for a large unit of New York State public employees. In an election held December 5, 1975, an SEIU-led coalition which included the American Federation of Teachers (AFT), the Laborers' International Union of North America, the International Brotherhood of Teamsters, and several building trades unions was defeated by CSEA, 10,858 to 10,348 with 1,015 voting for neither union. With neither side winning a majority, a second election was held the first week of February 1976, which CSEA won (14,321 to 10,184).

But Hardy continued to raid CSEA. CSEA leaders initially sought protection by affiliating with AFSCME. Article 20 of the AFL-CIO constitution prohibits affiliates from raiding one another's members, and an affiliation with AFSCME would have won CSEA relief from the raids. But CSEA delegates formally barred their leaders from seeking an affiliation with AFSCME in March 1976. CSEA's contract with the state of New York expired in 1977. Although CSEA leaders once more proposed a strike, the union settled for a 14 percent pay raise in April 1977. Hardy, convinced SEIU could successfully raid CSEA, conducted secret polls which showed deep unrest in the professional, scientific, and technical (PS&T) unit. Working only with the AFT, SEIU once more obtained enough petitions to challenge CSEA representation in the PS&T unit. The raid was successful, and the coalition (known as the Public Employees Federation) won, 15,062 to 12,259. Hardy and AFT leader Albert Shanker hoped to raid CSEA further, but CSEA affiliated with AFSMCE on April 21, 1978. The affiliation made AFSCME the largest affiliate in the AFL-CIO.

CSEA challenged the SEIU/AFT coalition's victory, however. CSEA attorneys alleged that nearly 5,000 of the signatures on the petition forcing an election were fraudulent. A New York Supreme Court (the state's trial court of general jurisdiction) initially dismissed the suit, but it was reinstated by a state appellate court. As the lawsuit progressed, CSEA won a new three-year contract which included a 7 percent pay hike in the first year. But the Public Employees Federation ultimately prevailed in the New York Court of Appeals (the highest court in the state of New York) on March 28, 1979. PEF subsequently negotiated a controversial contract which gave union members a 36 percent pay increase over three years. Submitted to the members without the approval of PEF's executive council, the contract was overwhelmingly approved by PEF members on December 6, 1979.

=== Political activity ===
Hardy continued to be very politically active as SEIU president. Angry that the AFL-CIO executive council and AFL-CIO president George Meany had refused to endorse George McGovern for president in the 1972 presidential election, Hardy formed a group of like-minded labor leaders and announced the group would stump nationwide for McGovern. In gratitude for his actions, Hardy was nominated to and won a seat on the Democratic National Committee in 1973. Despite the public nature of his political feuds with the more conservative Meany, Hardy backed Meany when the AFL-CIO attempted to block proportional rules for race, ethnicity, and gender among delegates to the DNC Convention. Hardy was one of many labour leaders to provide early support to former Oklahoma Senator Fred Harris during his run for the presidency in 1976. Even after Harris' campaign had collapsed, Hardy continued to push his candidacy. He also publicly criticized jimmy Carter for accepting a $1,000 donation from the anti-union J.P. Stevens textile company. In the 1980 presidential election, Hardy backed California Governor Jerry Brown for president. Some argued that Hardy's support was given because Brown had intervened in a labour dispute between SEIU and the California Horse Racing Board. When Brown's candidacy collapse, Hardy backed Massachusetts Senator Ted Kennedy's candidacy for president.

Hardy was active locally and nationally on a variety of issues in the 1970s. He sat on a President Richard Nixon's Cost of Living Council, and was an active participant on its health industry wage and salary committee. He was an early advocate for crackdowns on waste and fraud in the nation's nursing homes, and advocated that the government not pay for poor quality care. When New York City neared bankruptcy in 1975, Hardy led a group of union leaders in lobbying for federal aid for the city. He also pushed for federal legislation which would give federal and state public employees the right to strike.

=== Final negotiations ===
In his final years as president of SEIU, Hardy laid the ground for yet another major affiliation. The Drug, Hospital, and Health Care Employees Union, Local 1199 of the Retail, Wholesale and Department Store Union (RWDSU), was a union of nurses, service workers, LPNs, and other health care employees. By 1960, it had organized nearly every hospital in New York City, and in the 1970s expanded nationwide. RWDSU had been expelled by the AFL-CIO in the 1950s for leftist tendencies, and the union's success in health care was giving rise to rumours of raiding. 1199, as the union was called, wanted to disaffiliate from RWDSU and join with a larger union with greater organizing resources. Moe Foner and other leaders of 1199 began meeting with Hardy in the late 1970s to explore affiliation with SEIU. The negotiations did not come to any conclusion, however, and in the early 1980s a major split in 1199 led all of the union's locals outside New York City to disaffiliate and form their own independent national healthcare union, the National Union of Hospital and Health Care Employees (NUHHCE). NUHHCE received a charter from the AFl-CIO in 1984, which prevented any raids on it. But NUHHCE was too thinly spread nationwide, however, with 75,000 members in 12 locals, and its leaders quickly decided to merge with another national union. In 1989, NUHHCE permitted its locals to vote to merge with either SEIU or AFSCME. A third of the locals affiliated went with AFSCME, and two-thirds with SEIU. These mergers made SEIU the largest health care workers' union in North America and the fastest-growing member of the AFL-CIO. In 1991, the original Local 1199 in New York City disaffiliated from RWDSU and became independent; it merged with SEIU in 1998.

Despite Hardy's cordial discussions with 1199 and his success in growing the union, some union leaders considered him too elderly to continue to lead the union and that his age had contributed to the lack of new member organizing. Faced with growing opposition in the leadership ranks, Hardy retired at the regularly scheduled SEIU convention in 1980. He was succeeded by John Sweeney.

On the occasion of his retirement, AFL-CIO President Lane Kirkland praised him. "George Hardy does not wear his social philosophy on his sleeve. He carries it in his heart," Kirkland said. "Because he is so uncompromising in his beliefs, it would be impossible not to have been on the opposite side of an issue at least once. But win or lose, George knows that when the fight for idealism is over, the practical battle for the survival of the labour movement begins. This commitment is what turns a collection of unions into a movement."

== Death ==
George Hardy retired with his second wife, Cissy, to Los Angeles. After her death in 1990, Hardy suffered from respiratory failure in his last years. He died of the disease at UCSF Children's Hospital in San Francisco on September 13, 1990. Hardy was survived by his daughter, Joan Hardy Twomey, and two grandchildren Elizabeth Ann Twomey and Robert Mitchell Twomey.

"Hardy was one of the great union leaders," Edmund G. (Pat) Brown, former Governor of California, said when Hardy's death was announced.

== Archival and Historical Materials ==
George Hardy's life and professional career is documented in historical materials housed within various archival collections. The largest collection is the SEIU Executive Office: George Hardy Records at the Walter P. Reuther Library. Its records encompass SEIU's efforts to unionize healthcare workers, collective bargaining for public employees, and the unsuccessful merger with Local 1199. Other collections on Hardy can be found at Labor Archives and Research Center at San Francisco State University.

== Notes ==
Trade union offices
Preceded by David Sullivan	President of the Service Employees International Union; 1971–1980	Succeeded by John Sweeney
Preceded by William Sidell; Sol Stetin	AFL-CIO delegate to the Trades Union Congress; 1976; With: Hal C. Davis	Succeeded by J. C. Turner
