= William Calvin =

William Calvin may refer to:

- William H. Calvin, American theoretical neurophysiologist
- William A. Calvin, Canadian-born American labor union leader
