= George J. Richardson =

American labor union leader

George J. Richardson (November 25, 1893 – January 5, 1980) was an American labor union leader.

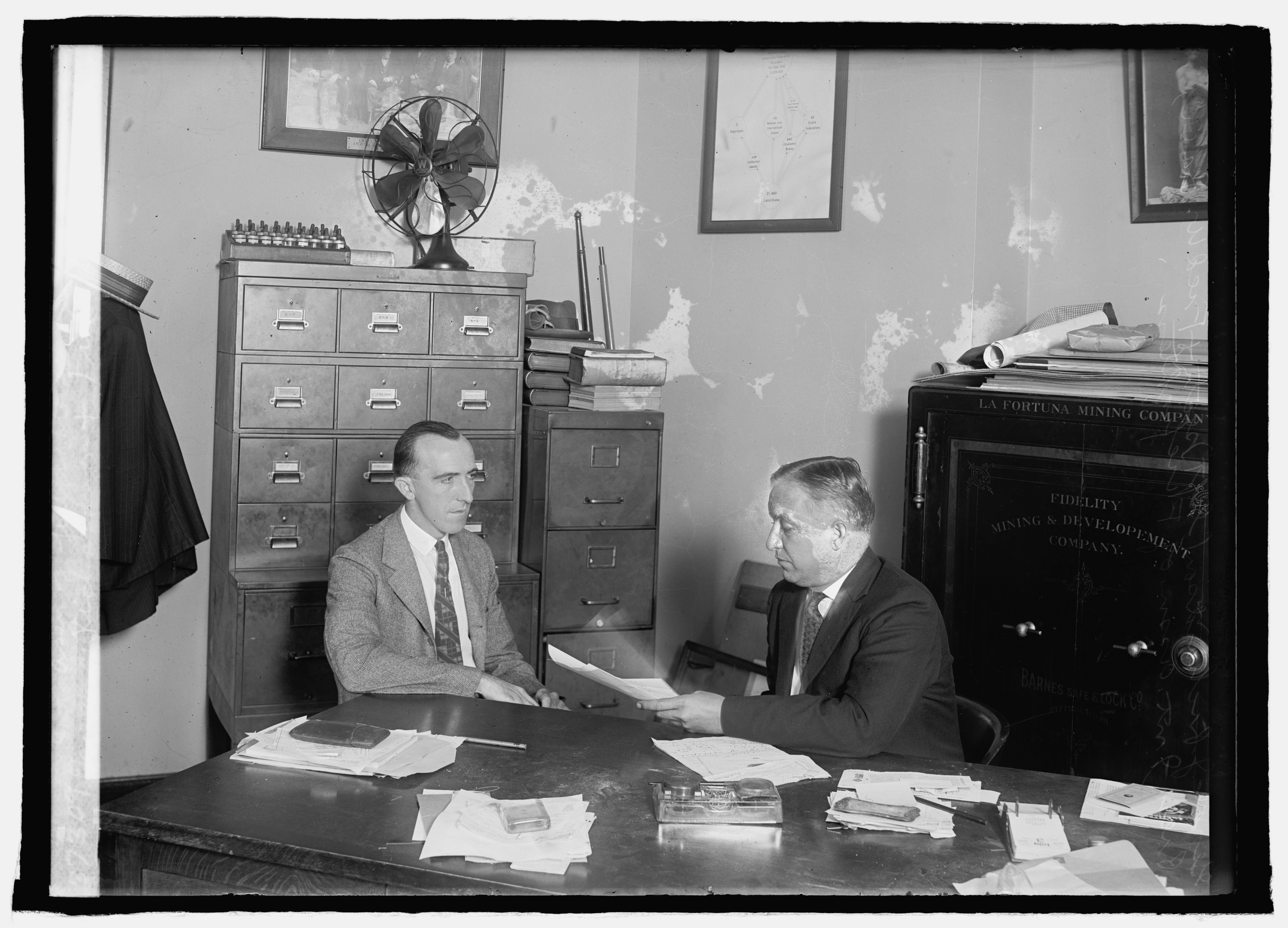

Born in Worcester, Massachusetts, Richardson emigrated to Canada when he was 18, settling in Vancouver, and in 1913, he joined the local fire department. In 1916, he joined Local S18, an independent union of firefighters, soon becoming its secretary. He represented the union at the 1918 convention which established the International Association of Fire Fighters (IAFF), and in 1920 was elected as secretary-treasurer of the international union, relocating to Washington, D.C.

Richardson served on various government commissions, and undertook international assignments for the American Federation of Labor (AFL). During World War II, he visited combat areas of the Pacific for the AFL, and in 1947, he represented the AFL at the British Trades Union Congress. That year, he was appointed to the President's Commission on Fire Prevention, and in 1951, he joined the Federal Civil Defense Advisory Council.

Richardson retired from his union posts in 1956, becoming secretary-treasurer emeritus of the IAFF. He began working as a special assistant to George Meany, head of the AFL-CIO, successor to the AFL. He left that post in 1962, becoming a consultant to the Department of Defense on matters relating to civil defense. He fully retired in 1972, and died eight years later.

In his spare time, Richardson played ice hockey in his youth. From 1937 until 1975, he was in charge of the down markers for the Washington Redskins.

Trade union offices
Preceded by William Smith	Secretary-Treasurer of the International Association of Fire Fighters; 1920–1956	Succeeded by William D. Buck
Preceded by Edward J. Brown; Thomas Kennedy	American Federation of Labor delegate to the Trades Union Congress; 1947; With: Arnold S. Zander	Succeeded by Patrick E. Gorman; Edward J. Volz
