= William F. Schnitzler =

American labor union leader

William Frank Schnitzler (January 21, 1904 – June 17, 1983) was an American labor union leader.

Born in Newark, New Jersey, Schnitzler began working on a peddler's wagon, then during World War I worked in an ammunition factory. In the 1920s, he became a metal polisher, then an apprentice baker with the Peerless Baking Company. He joined the Bakery and Confectionery Workers' International Union, rising to become its business agent in 1943, and then its general secretary-treasurer in 1946.

In 1950, Schnitzler became president of the union, but in 1952 he moved to become secretary-treasurer of the American Federation of Labor (AFL), in which role he played a leading role in negotiating its merger with the Congress of Industrial Organizations (CIO). When the AFL–CIO was formed, he remained in the same position, the second-most senior role in the federation.

In 1961, Schnitzler chaired a committee investigating discrimination against minorities in the union movement, and declared his opposition to racism. He retired in 1969, moving to Lewes, Delaware, where he died in 1983.

Trade union offices
| Preceded by Herman Winter | Secretary-Treasurer of the Bakery and Confectionery Workers' International Union; 1943–1950 | Succeeded by James G. Cross |
| Preceded by Herman Winter | President of the Bakery and Confectionery Workers' International Union; 1950–1952 | Succeeded by James G. Cross |
| Preceded by George Meany | Secretary-Treasurer of the American Federation of Labor; 1952–1955 | Succeeded by Federation merged |
| Preceded by New position | Secretary-Treasurer of the AFL–CIO; 1955–1969 | Succeeded by Lane Kirkland |
| Preceded by Michael Fox; C. J. Haggerty | AFL-CIO delegate to the Trades Union Congress; 1956; With: Emil Rieve | Succeeded by Joseph D. Keenan; Walter P. Reuther |
