= Public Employees Federation =

New York AFL-CIO-affiliated union

PEF
- Public Employees Federation
- Founded: 1978
- Headquarters: 1168–1170 Troy-Schenectady Rd., Latham, NY 12110
- Location: United States
- Members: 57,229 (Sept. 2024)
- Key people: Wayne Spence, President, Joe Donahue, Secretary-Treasurer, Randi DiAntonio, Bruce Giddings, Darlene Williams, Vice Presidents
- Affiliations: AFT (AFL–CIO), SEIU (SOC)
- Website: www.pef.org

The Public Employees Federation (PEF) is a labor union representing more than 57,000 professional, scientific, and technical public employees in the state of New York. The union is one of the largest local white-collar unions in the United States and is New York's second-largest state-employee union. PEF also represents employees who work in private-sector jobs and local government agencies. The union publishes The Communicator, an online newsletter for members, 10 times annually.

== Governance ==
Membership (US records)
View chart definition.
Finances (US records; ×$1000)
View chart definition.

PEF is a member-driven union, with policy set by an elected Executive Board that meets four times annually, and Convention delegates, who per the union's Constitution "shall meet once annually between September 1st and November 30th at a time and place determined by the Executive Board.”

The union President, Secretary-Treasurer, three Vice Presidents, three Trustees, and 12 Regional Coordinators are elected by a vote of the entire membership via mail-in ballot. Statewide officers serve a term of three years. The current officers were sworn in on Aug. 1, 2024 and will serve until July 31, 2027.

== Origins ==
In 1971, 61-year-old George Hardy was elected president of the Service Employees International Union (SEIU). Under Hardy, SEIU's health care and public employee divisions saw rapid growth. Much of the membership growth, however, came through affiliation rather than new member organizing. Hardy viewed the fast-growing American Federation of State, County and Municipal Employees (AFSCME) as SEIU's chief competitor. AFSCME had grown from a mere 100,000 members in 1951 to 500,000 members in 1972, and had elected a dynamic and aggressive new leader, 45-year-old Jerry Wurf, in 1964. Not only was AFSCME's growth substantial, its demographics matched those of SEIU's: At least two-thirds of the rival union's members were blue-collar workers, and a fifth of them worked in hospitals and nursing homes. To counter AFSCME's rapid growth, Hardy adopted a strategy of affiliating existing unions rather than organizing unorganized workers. Between 1971 and 1980, SEIU affiliated 22 independent unions. Merger and affiliation accounted for 230,000 new members from 1971 to 1985, and virtually all of the union's growth from 1980 to 1984.

One of SEIU's major growth spurts came in 1978, when it raided the Civil Service Employees Association (CSEA). In existence since 1910, CSEA had won representation rights for New York State's 140,000 public employees after the state passed a public employee collective bargaining law in 1968. Structured like an association rather than a union, CSEA hesitated to engage in militant labor action or strike, and yet it had a rocky relationship with the state: The union struck for two days at the beginning of April 1972 and won a 5.5 percent pay hike. But the strike and dissatisfaction with CSEA's leadership led some CSEA members to ask for representation by SEIU. With Hardy's strong backing, the newly formed union was able to gather enough signatures on petitions to trigger a representational vote in two of the four units where workers were represented by CSEA, but SEIU lost the vote by a 3-to-1 margin in December 1972. A second strike planned by CSEA leaders was called off after delegates overwhelmingly repudiated a strike resolution supported by the union's leaders. The internal strife led SEIU to once again challenge CSEA for a large unit of New York State public employees. In an election held December 5, 1975, an SEIU-led coalition which included the American Federation of Teachers (AFT), the Laborers' International Union of North America, the International Brotherhood of Teamsters, and several building trades unions was defeated by CSEA, 10,858 to 10,348 with 1,015 voting for neither union. With neither side winning a majority, a second election was held the first week of February 1976, which CSEA won (14,321 to 10,184).

But Hardy continued to raid CSEA. CSEA leaders initially sought protection by affiliating with AFSCME. Article 20 of the AFL–CIO constitution prohibits affiliates from raiding one another's members, and an affiliation with AFSCME would have won CSEA relief from the raids. But CSEA delegates formally barred their leaders from seeking an affiliation with AFSCME in March 1976. CSEA's contract with the state of New York expired in 1977. Although CSEA leaders once more proposed a strike, the union settled for a 14 percent pay raise in April 1977. Hardy, convinced SEIU could successfully raid CSEA, conducted secret polls which showed that deep unrest in the professional, scientific, and technical (PS&T) unit. Working only with the AFT, SEIU once more obtained enough petitions to challenge CSEA representation in the PS&T unit. The raid was successful, and the coalition (known as the Public Employees Federation) won, 15,062 to 12,259. Hardy and AFT leader Albert Shanker hoped to raid CSEA further, but CSEA affiliated with AFSMCE on April 21, 1978. The affiliation made AFSCME the largest affiliate in the AFL–CIO.

CSEA challenged the SEIU/AFT coalition's victory, however. CSEA attorneys alleged that nearly 5,000 of the signatures on the petition forcing an election were fraudulent. A New York Supreme Court (the state's trial court of general jurisdiction) initially dismissed the suit, but it was reinstated by a state appellate court. As the lawsuit progressed, CSEA won a new three-year contract which included a 7 percent pay hike in the first year. But the new union, now called the Public Employees Federation, ultimately prevailed in the New York Court of Appeals (the highest court in the state of New York) on March 28, 1979. PEF subsequently negotiated a controversial contract which gave union members a 36 percent pay increase over three years. Submitted to the members without the approval of PEF's executive council, the contract was overwhelmingly approved by PEF members on December 6, 1979.

== History ==
=== Kraemer presidency ===
PEF's first president, John J. Kraemer, served a single, turbulent term in office. He was accused of being a "no-show" employee at his previous position with the New York State Department of Labor, but was exonerated of the charges. He also had been accused and found innocent of being paid a salary from both PEF and state. As his legal troubles continued, Kraemer focused on negotiating the union's second contract. Pensions were a major issue for the union. In 1976, the state enacted a new pension plan under which state employees paid income taxes on their mandatory contribution to the state pension plan, which PEF claimed forced workers to pay taxes on income they may never receive. Although the agreement ratified in March 1982 did not address the pension issue, the contract negotiated by Kraemer won pay raises of 9 percent the first year and 8 percent the next two years in exchange for a reduction in the number of sick days given to employees.

Kraemer lost re-election in 1982 to Elizabeth Hoke. The 1,100-member Statewide Coalition for a Democratic Union (SCDU), at the time PEF's only organized "political party," had formed to challenge Kraemer and support Hoke. The election was a bitter one, with Hoke accusing Kraemer of poor leadership.

=== Hoke presidency ===
When Hoke assumed the presidency, she found the union was more than $400,000 in debt. An investigation found that Kraemer had embezzled funds from the union. Kraemer pleaded guilty to the charges in early 1987.

Hoke's presidency was in some ways dissimilar to Kraemer's. Unlike Kraemer, Hoke took a low-key approach to the PEF presidency, rarely seeking the media spotlight or public attention. But her presidency suffered several scandals as well. In 1984, Hoke revoked the union leave of PEF's three statewide vice presidents, a move which was very controversial among PEF members. Later that year, she was accused of using her PEF credit card for personal expenses. Hoke also sued to sever PEF's dual affiliation with the AFT and SEIU, claiming the two unions held too much power over PEF and provided little services in return. The suit was unsuccessful.

Contract negotiations in 1985 were particularly contentious. PEF was especially critical of a state proposal to restructure the state employee health insurance program. Mediators had to be called in to help settle the contract. PEF settled for 5 percent pay raises in each of the contract's three years and an accidental-death benefit. Hoke failed to win re-election in 1985 due to member dissatisfaction with 1985 contract. SCDU withdrew its support for Hoke and actively supported challenger Rand Condell.

=== Condell presidency ===
Rand Condell struggled to bring some organizational stability to PEF. In 1986, he settled a lawsuit against PEF by the New York State United Teachers (NYSUT) and the AFT. NYSUT and the AFT had claimed that PEF had underpaid dues for half its membership since its inception, leading to a $10 million to $12 million underpayment. In the settlement, PEF withdrew as an affiliate of NYSUT (AFT's state federation in New York) and the AFT agreed to reimburse NYSUT for the services NYSUT had rendered to PEF. In return, PEF agreed to pay increase per capita dues payments for half its members by 71 percent (to $72 from $42) and remit the higher dues payments to the AFT. The NYSUT disaffiliation saved PEF $3.5 million a year, but increased PEF's dues to the AFT by $600,000 a year.

To cover the cost of the higher payments to the AFT, Condell sought a large dues increase from PEF members. Condell proposed raising dues on a sliding scale, with its lowest-paid members incurring a 14 percent dues increase while its highest-paid members saw a 55 percent dues increase. The dues hikes would be the first since the last year of Kraemer's presidency. Although Condell expected easy passage of the dues hike, the proposal did not win the 60 percent majority needed at the PEF convention in October 1986. Condell immediately resubmitted the dues proposal to members two days later, and it easily passed (leading to an average increase of $4.08 per member per month, giving the union about $2.8 million more each year). The extra dues allowed PEF to build a new headquarters in Latham, New York.

During his first term in office, Condell fought the state on a number of issues. The need for higher pensions continued to rank high on the union's agenda. The union also fought large layoffs of state workers, particularly at the New York State Department of Labor. But much of the union's attention was focused on a major battle in 1987 over pay equity. The governor had proposed and the state legislature had approved a plan to give more than 42,600 state workers (about 5,000 of whom were PEF members) retroactive pay increases to make up for disparities with private-sector pay, lower wages given to women, and work in hazardous occupations. PEF filed a grievance against the pay plan, arguing that it downgraded some of the occupational titles of its members. PEF reacted angrily when the pay equity increase subsequently went through for all state workers except those belonging to PEF. Condell then negotiated an agreement preventing any job title downgrades, and the pay increase for PEF members went through in September 1987.

As Condell's first term ended, he promised to push for "substantial" pay raises in the union's upcoming contract negotiations even as his opponents attacked him for concentrating authority in staff hands and for poor leadership. Nonetheless, he was challenged for the SCDU endorsement by Michael Keenan, president of PEF's largest division. Condell defeated Keenan, 388 to 275. Nonetheless, a new political party, the Committee for Independent Officers, arose and successfully contended for four of the six seats for state vice president, regional coordinator, and trustee (including among its winning candidates future PEF presidents Howard Shafer and Roger Benson). To firm up his political position, Condell called for a two- rather than three-year contract, with a 7 percent pay rise in each year. Even when CSEA settled for a three-year agreement with salary increases of 5 percent, 5.5 percent, and 5.5 percent in each of its three years, Condell continued to push for 7 percent. But health insurance, not pay, ended up being the biggest stumbling block. The state declared an impasse in mid June (10 weeks after PEF's contract had expired), and mediators were called in. Without the mediators' help, however, Condell reached a three-year agreement on July 11 with the same pay structure achieved by CSEA and no improvements in health benefits.

On July 20, 1988, PEF won its first private-sector representation election (for workers at the New York City branch of Narcotic and Drug Research Inc.—a contractor for the state).

Condell barely survived a serious political challenge to his presidency in 1989. PEF spent much of the year fighting layoffs. Convinced that PEF would be fighting layoffs the following year as well, Condell proposed raising dues 26.6 percent ($5.28 a month) to build a public relations and legal war chest. But PEF leaders balked at submitting the dues increase to the membership. PEF's 127-member executive board refused to recommend Condell's dues hike to the membership, but agreed to submit the plan to a vote anyway. The leadership of PEF's Capitol District (its largest region) floated their own plan for a dues increase at a much lower level, and observers concluded that if Condell lost the dues vote at the upcoming PEF convention in October he would probably not be able to win re-election in 1991. PEF members did indeed reject Condell's proposal for a dues increase (twice), but also refused to approval six other plans for a dues increase offered by leaders of the Capitol District as well as others. After extensive parliamentary maneuvering (which some PEF members claimed was illegal), Condell was able to win approval of his original dues proposal.

Condell's support within the union evaporated throughout 1990, and Condell fought the state over early retirement, hiring freezes, large layoffs, furloughs, and a state plan which withheld a week's pay from workers until they retired. In this difficult employment environment, the PEF contract expired. Negotiations with the state stalemated in March 1991, the state declared an impasse, and an arbitrator was named in April.

Condell was challenged for the PEF presidency by Howard Shafer. Shafer, supported by the Team for a Stronger Membership caucus, ran a full slate of candidates and accused Condell of poor leadership and embracing Governor Mario Cuomo too strongly. The election was a bitter one, and Shafer contended Condell was using the union's monthly newsmagazine to promote his candidacacy On June 26, 1991, after record turnout, Shafer defeated Condell 3 to 1 (12,948 to 7,963, a margin of victory that surprised both candidates), and Shafer's entire ticket was swept into office.

Scandal struck the union again in Condell's final days in office. Condell signed an agreement which would give his senior aides lucrative severance payments worth thousands of dollars each if they were fired by Shafer. After a half hour of debate, the PEF executive board overturned the severance agreements on Shafer's first day in office.

=== Shafer presidency ===
At first, the expired contract Shafer inherited did not seem an intractable problem. In December 1991, PEF members ratified a contractual change to their health plan which was seen as a referendum on Shafer's leadership. But negotiations for the expiring PEF contract soon broke down, a legislative fact-finding panel was imposed on the talks, and the state proposed eliminating nearly 14,000 public sector jobs. Finally, the governor set a June 25 deadline for resolving any contract talks. PEF held out. But when other unions settled their contracts, PEF wanted the same deal and didn't get it. The state legislature adjourned without enacting any PEF contract, although it was on the verge of passing a law requiring binding arbitration between the state and PEF. The lack of a contract created a crisis for many PEF members. Nearly 153,000 PEF workers and their family members lost their prescription drug, dental care, and vision care benefits in September 1992. The governor urged both sides to bargain as the benefits crisis worsened, although a state judge later ordered the benefits restored through the end of calendar year 1992.

As the state laid off public workers, PEF's membership dropped from 59,000 to 55,000 members, depriving the union of $1 million in dues revenue. Vacant positions on PEF's staff were eliminated or went unfilled (angering members, who felt the brunt of the grievance and service cuts), and officers took salary cuts. PEF members accused Shafer of playing politics with the staff cuts by jettisoning staff positions filled by his political opponents, and the PEF executive board retaliated by dismissing Roger Benson (one of Shafer's closest aides). The internal dissent became so bad that alleged assaults, racially inflammatory fliers, and accusations of financial fraud occurred at the SEIU Convention which PEF delegates attended in May 1992. Some PEF members began circulating decertification petitions, and Shafer's political opponents formed a new caucus (Members United for a Responsible Union) to run a slate of candidates against him in 1994.

The bargaining atmosphere deteriorated throughout the remainder of 1992. The state's chief negotiator said he would wait for the legislative fact-finding panel's recommendation, Shafer implied he might oppose a proposed bond measure which would help fund state jobs, and Shafer accused the governor of releasing private confidential negotiating information to PEF members without the union's consent. At PEF's convention in October 1992, Members United for a Responsible Union leafletted against Shafer, accused him of neglecting members' needs and trying to curry favor with the AFT. Although the legislature passed a mandatory binding arbitration bill, the governor vetoed the legislation. Now looking at two years without a new contract, Shafer hired Theodore W. Kheel, a well-known labor negotiator, to help the union win a new pact.

PEF reached a new contract with the state in March 1993. Although the state's chief negotiation withdrew the state's last contract offer at the end of February, the governor personally put it back on the table. Shafer quickly agreed to the pact, which included a 9.5 percent salary increase over four years that was retroactive to April 1, 1991; moved PEF members into the state's health insurance pool; and ended PEF's lawsuit over the state's decision to defer a week's pay until each member retired. Although the PEF executive board voted to recommend the contract to PEF's members, those who voted "no" on the pact argued that PEF had achieved less than other unions, that the deal traded concessions for pay increases, and that the money spent on Kheel's consulting contract had gotten the union nothing better than what had been offered months before. The board meeting was a raucous one, with alleged physical confrontations, a "Dump Shafer" movement hanging banners near the entrance, rumors of decertification, and proposals for PEF to abandon its independence and join either SEIU or AFT. Members of PEF voted 28,774 to 7,281 to ratify the new four-year contract on May 12, 1993.

Shafer was defeated for re-election as PEF president by James Sheedy in June 1994. Although Shafer and Sheedy had originally been on the same political slate three years earlier, the relationship between the two men had deteriorated into a chilly civility in which they communicated with one another largely via memo (despite having offices next door to one another). The margin of victory was 388 votes, the slimmest margin in the union's 15-year history. Sheedy's entire slate also narrowly edged out the Shafer slate's candidates.

=== Sheedy presidency ===
Sheedy spent much of his first two years in office as his predecessors did—fighting large layoffs of state workers. Governor George Pataki vetoed legislation improving pensions, threatened to shut down state government and furlough all non-essential workers if the legislature didn't approve his budget, attempted to close state-run health care facilities, and cut more than 5,500 state jobs. In this difficult negotiating climate, Sheedy re-negotiated PEF's expiring contract in April 1995. He agreed to the same financial package won by CSEA a month earlier: A four-year contract with a 3.5 percent salary increase in 1997 and 1998, and one-time bonuses in 1996 and 1997; a change in civil service definitions which would permit PEF workers to transfer more easily to other jobs and retain their salary levels; and no expiration date for the union's benefit packages. Additional job cuts occurred in 1996 and 1997, totalling 20,000 state workers. The state offered early retirement again to many employees. When the state pension fund showed a surplus, Sheedy found himself caught between two opposing factions of PEF members: Use the funds to lower pension contribution costs from current members, or give the surplus to retiree members as a cost-of-living increase.

Sheedy was more successful on other issues. He signed the union's first agreement with the state to provide domestic partner benefits in September 1994. He fiercely fought a move to consolidate state information technology workers at sites the union felt were hazardous. PEF also won a federal lawsuit requiring the state to pay millions of dollars in overtime to PEF members, and reinstated the lawsuit in state court after the state appealed.

Sheedy also undertook the union's first large-scale organizing campaigns since its formation. AFT, one of PEF's parent unions, assigned a full-time national organizer to help PEF organize health care workers in the private sector who worked for potential state contractors. But this plan backfired politically. In 1996, PEF won an election for 42 paraprofessional health care workers working for a private contractor at the Coxsackie Correctional Facility. This organizing drive was highly criticized by Sheedy's political opponents, who claimed the union's executive board did not approve the organizing effort and who argued that PEF should only be organizing professional (not paraprofessional) workers.

Sheedy also fought openly with the PEF staff union. Ninety-six of PEF's 120 staff belonged to Local 9265 of the United Steelworkers of America and had been working without a contract for nine months by March 1996. The staff union complained that PEF refused to negotiate over layoffs and downsizing, demanded a 10 percent pay raise (with differential pay for downstate workers), and several position upgrades. Roger Benson, former chief of staff under PEF President Howard Shafer, supported the staff union publicly and strongly criticized Sheedy for his poor labor relations. PEF and its staff union finally settled their contract dispute in June 1996. The staff union won 3.5 percent pay increases in 1998 and 1999 and lump-sum bonuses paid in 1996 and 1997, enhancements to the dental plan, and concessions on the prescription drug plan and seniority rights.

Sheedy's re-election campaign was a difficult, and ultimately unsuccessful, one. Beginning in the spring of 1996, Roger Benson began putting together a statewide organization ("Members First") and publishing an alternative newsletter. Benson put together a full slate of officers and formally launched his campaign at PEF's October 1996 convention. Benson announced a four-part platform: 1) Establishment of a PEF department focused on protecting employment security; 2) Budgeting substantial resources to enforce the Civil Service merit system; 3) Employment of a full-time professional contract negotiator; and 4) Elimination of officer perks. A third candidate, Jim Israel (a PEF shop steward), entered the race in January 1997 but withdrew when he was unable to obtain enough signatures to secure his nomination. Benson's slate of candidates included Jane Hallum (a computer programmer) for secretary-treasurer and future PEF president Kenneth Brynien as an executive board member. Sheedy and Benson battled over the state pension surplus, and engaged in a letter-to-the-editor war in the newspapers. Benson promised not to raise dues and re-open union offices, while Sheedy admitted a dues hike might be necessary in 1999. In June 1997, Benson defeated Sheedy by a vote of 11,407 to 8,956.

=== Benson presidency ===
Roger Benson made immediate changes in the way PEF conducted its business. He dismissed six staff members and returned to having two administrators share duties over the daily operation of the union. He also named two close associates to the staff, and criticized the decision of the Sheedy-led executive board for enhancing the staff's severance packages. Local newspapers called the changes "bloodletting", and reported that additional layoffs were likely to come.

Among PEF's major political initiatives at this time were a cost-of-living increase for worker pensions. Benson also said he would seek improvements to job security; accrual (rather than use-or-lose) for overtime, sick leave, and vacation; eliminate tiers in the pension plan; seek an end to penalties for early retirement; new workplace safety protections; an increase in the size of the state workforce; and new restrictions on contracting out. The state replied that it would seek a four-year wage freeze. Angered by the state's response in a time of budget surpluses, Benson led PEF workers in an extensive lobbying effort. He also said PEF would seek a three-year rather than four-year contract, and 5 percent per year wage increases. Benson also replaced the union's top negotiator in order to adopt a more aggressive stand with the state. The state countered with a 3 percent per year salary increase over four years, coupled with new restrictions on time off for union business, higher health care costs, and new worktime reporting requirements (all of which PEF rejected). At a rally at the state capital on January 5, 2000, some 5,000 (state estimate) to 25,000 (PEF estimate) workers peacefully confronted 25 Albany police and 300 New York State troopers. PEF revised its wage offer to 12 percent over three years. Benson accused the state in March 2000 of dragging out the negotiations, and began a statewide radio advertising campaign against the governor. In April, PEF accepted a contract with the New York State Canal Corporation with a 3 percent per year salary hike. Days later, after another state union accepted a contract containing a 13.6 percent raise over four years, about 2,000 PEF members held a noisy rally outside the governor's offices demanding faster negotiations. Two weeks afterward, PEF agreed to end its advertising campaign and rallies as a spur to negotiations. A week later, Governor George Pataki agreed to wage and pension COLAs. A tentative agreement reached on June 10, 2000, incorporated a 13 percent wage hike over four years, rejected the new working time data collection methods, and imposed slight increases in member health care payments. Union members approved the contract by a vote of 33,899 to 2,876.

Benson revealed a financial scandal in the union during his first term in office. In July 1999, PEF sued former president James Sheedy and other former officers for allegedly embezzling more than $62,000 from the union. The union's lawsuit said the officers reimbursed themselves financially for sick leave they never took. But the PEF executive board retroactively approved the sick leave buybacks in a private meeting in August 1999, forcing Benson to drop the lawsuit. Nonetheless, former PEF Secretary-Treasurer Patricia Ford was convicted of bribery in June 2003.

Benson was re-elected without opposition in late 2000. He and his slate of officers were easily renominated, while an opponent received only 17 of the necessary 4,998 signatures needed to run for office. During Benson's second term, several PEF members died during the September 11 attacks on New York City. Of the 300 PEF members who worked in the World Trade Center, 34 were killed in the attack.

One of PEF's larger campaigns during Benson's time in office was fighting health care cutbacks in New York state. For several years, the union protested against staff layoffs and the closure of hospitals and other health care facilities. PEF also sought increases in the number of health care workers on staff, an end to mandatory overtime, and minimum worker-to-patient staffing ratios.

Benson was re-elected without opposition to a third term in 2003, the first time any PEF president had been elected to a third term.

Benson immediately entered into negotiations for a new contract after his re-election. Initially, PEF had hopes for easier contract negotiations after Governor Pataki fulfilled a promise to give PEF members three additional days of sick leave per year. But after working without a contract for a year, PEF members found that Pataki proposed contract concessions in order to bring the state's budget into balance. In March 2004, after CSEA agreed to a four-year contract with an average 2.85 percent wage increase each year, Benson denounced Pataki's offer of 1 percent per year to PEF members and a cap on state contributions to the employee pension fund. Once again, methods for accounting for working time became a major sticking point in the negotiations, with Benson characterizing this as a "deal-breaker." But in July 2004, PEF agreed to a new four-year contract which included salary increases of $800 in the first year; 2.5 percent, 2.75 percent, and 3 percent salary increases in the last three years; and a new "locality pay" increase for workers in the mid-Hudson Valley region (where the cost of living was significantly higher than surrounding areas).

In February 2005, Benson declined to run for a fourth term in 2006.

One of the final achievements of the Benson presidency was enactment of legislation requiring the state to disclose the number and amount of money spent on private contractors. PEF began its campaign in the fall of 2005, and Governor Pataki signed the legislation in March 2006.

=== Brynien presidency ===
Kenneth Brynien was elected PEF president over Michael Del Piano on June 27, 2006, by a vote of 7,874 to 7,024 (a margin of 850 votes, or 5.8 percent). Brynien said a major goal of his presidency would be to enhance PEF's legislative efforts in the state capital.

Brynien and the union confronted a state proposal to close or merge several state-owned hospitals and other health care facilities during his first year in office. A state commission first proposed the plan in November 2006. Brynien and PEF strongly opposed the plan, claiming it would harm patients and lead to lower levels of care. PEF's parent union, SEIU, said it would not oppose the plan. PEF began a series of public protests and a legislative lobbying effort to prevent the closures and mergers. It also sued to prevent the plan from being implemented.

Brynien negotiated a new collective bargaining agreement for PEF in 2008. Negotiations for the new contract were short and generated almost no public notice. The four-year contract's terms, which were retroactive to April 2007 (the date the old agreement expired), included an average 4 percent wage increase per year, higher pay for employees working in or near New York City, new health insurance benefits, and improved educational benefits. About two-thirds of PEF members voted in contract approval balloting, with the pact receiving 97 approval for those who did vote.

During Brynien's first term as president, PEF also won a long-sought ban on mandatory overtime. Legislation on the issue was introduced in May 2007, and on June 18, 2008, Governor David Paterson signed into law a ban on mandatory overtime in state facilities.

Three months later, PEF successfully lobbied the state legislature to provide for permanent collection of union dues and a "fair share" provision in the dues structure. Under prior New York State law, the state was required to collect dues on PEF's behalf (through the state's payroll system) and forward these monies to the union. Non-members were not required to pay dues to the union, even though the union was required by law to represent these workers. This law required renewal every two years. PEF had long sought a permanent version of the law, one which enacted a "fair share" provision requiring non-members to pay a portion of dues (for the services they received). The state legislature finally passed just such a law in July 2008, and it was signed into law by Governor Paterson.

PEF also became embroiled in major battles with Governor Paterson over the state budget, which occupied much of the remainder of Brynien's first term and the first few years of his second. When the late-2000s recession severely depressed New York state tax revenues, Paterson demanded that PEF and other state employee unions re-open their contracts and adopt a wage freeze and other concessions to help the state balance its budget. PEF refused. PEF countered by suggesting a program of early retirement, which lawmakers began discussing. PEF also demanded that the state cut the number of independent contractors working for the state, arguing that New York could save up to $700 million by reducing the number of contractors or reducing payments to them. PEF also urged the state to adopt higher taxes on the very wealthy and for-profit health maintenance organizations, which the legislature did. Governor Paterson, determined to achieve spending cuts, ordered the layoff of more than 8,900 state workers on March 24, 2009. Brynien and other PEF leaders were deeply angered by Paterson's proposal. Led by PEF, the state's public employee unions produced television commercials and newspaper advertisements depicting Paterson with his fingers in his ears and unwilling to listen to voters. The New York Times said that attacks were some "of the nastiest and most personal against a governor in memory ... rare even by Albany's relaxed standards of political decorum." Brynien said Paterson should be faulted for forcing the unions into such an aggressive stand. Brynien also announced PEF would sue the state to prevent the layoffs from occurring. In response, Paterson said he would not lay off any workers if the state's unions agreed to a pension plan ("Tier V") for new workers that would provide much lower benefits. PEF reached an agreement with the governor under which Paterson agreed not to lay off workers in exchange for a $20,000 bonus to 4,000 highly paid workers if they retired early within the next year; the abolition of 2,500 vacant jobs; the creation of a new tier in the pension system which would save $440 million over two years; and the introduction of a plan for workers to voluntarily cut back their working hours.

Brynien was re-elected as PEF's president in June 2009 after no opposition candidate emerged.

In October 2009, PEF also fought a campaign to prevent the state from ordering the mandatory vaccination of thousands of state health care workers against the H1N1 flu virus (popularly known as the "swine flu"). The state ordered the mandatory vaccinations on September 30, 2009. Brynien and other PEF leaders demanded that the state make the vaccinations voluntary, arguing that the mass vaccination plan did not provide for exemptions for worker safety, such as pregnant women or those with severe allergies; the vaccine had not yet been properly tested for safety; and the vaccine did not provide enough protection to outweigh the invasion of civil rights. PEF sued, and on October 15 a state court agreed and imposed a temporary injunction preventing implementation of the plan. The state withdrew its plan a week later.

Six months after the pension deal was reached, however, Governor Paterson announced he would seek to prevent PEF members from receiving their scheduled 4 percent salary increase and seek furloughs of state workers to help close yet another budget deficit. Paterson raised the issues of furloughs in mid-August, just two months after the pension deal was reached. PEF countered once again by arguing that the state spent $3 billion a year on 23,000 consultants at a cost that was 62 percent higher than hiring a permanent worker. On April 1, 2010, Paterson demanded that PEF forgo its scheduled wage hike, but PEF refused to do so. About a week later, Paterson withheld the pay increase unilaterally, leading to strong denunciations by the union. Two weeks later, Paterson announced he would seek to furlough half the state's workforce one day a week for the rest of the year in addition to the wage freeze, and the state legislature appeared ready to agree to the plan. PEF began a legislative lobbying effort, but the legislature approved the furloughs. PEF and other unions sued to overturn the pay freeze and furloughs, and a federal district court temporarily prevented the state from implementing the furlough plan on May 11, 2010. The court also ordered the state to restore the wage increase. The court made the injunction permanent about two weeks later.

Governor Paterson then proposed laying off 10,000 state workers on January 1, 2011 (the day after his no-layoff pledge with the unions expired)—a plan PEF also opposed.

On June 1, 2010, during the height of the tension created by the fiscal crisis, The New York Post ran an article revealing that Ken Brynien had enjoyed an increase in salary of $25,000 annually from $112,440 in 2008 to $137,622 in 2010.

=== Kent presidency ===
On June 25, 2012, Susan Kent, a credentialing specialist at the New York State Education Department, defeated Ken Brynien, 8,739 to 7,562. Roughly a third of all eligible PEF members cast votes. Carlos Garcia, a member of Kent's "NY Union Proud" slate, defeated PEF Secretary-Treasurer Joe Fox, 8,111 to 8,063. A number of NY Union Proud members also won election to the PEF executive board. Kent pledged during the campaign to be tougher in negotiations with the state.

=== Spence presidency ===
On August 1, 2015, Wayne Spence was sworn in as PEF's ninth president and first African American president, following a close election against predecessor Susan Kent that was decided by 127 votes. A key priority for President Spence was to finalize ongoing contract talks with the Governor Andrew Cuomo Administration. During the Kent administration, the union's relations with Governor Cuomo soured, culminating in the union's endorsement of Zephyr Teachout during the 2014 New York Gubernatorial Election. Spence's election win was seen as a reset in relations with the Governor's office. Highlights during the first Spence term include the ratification of a one-year contract and a three-year contract in 2016 , and preparations for a Supreme Court ruling that threatened to end mandatory union dues.

President Spence was re-elected for a second term in 2018 in a three-way race in which he received over 64% of the vote. The start of the term was highlighted by the union's response to the Janus v. AFSCME Supreme Court decision that year, which declared mandatory union dues unconstitutional. During this term, President Spence coordinated PEF's initial response to the COVID-19 pandemic, including calling on the state to permit telecommuting among state employees, urging the state government to better protect its employees from the virus, and suing the state in response to reports about state employees being paid less than their hired rate for pandemic related overtime work.

President Spence was re-elected for a third term in 2021, and PEF had to contend with the ongoing response to the COVID-19 pandemic, including the challenge of the state mandating the return employees to offices despite a surge of COVID-19 cases. Highlights during this term include the 2021 ratification of a four-year contract (retroactive up to 2019, and lasting until 2023), defending employees impacted by COVID-19 vaccination requirements and addressing PEF member concerns about returning to state office amidst a COVID-19 surge, securing an agreement to successfully restructure nursing titles resulting in pay increases for PEF nurses, and the successful ratification of a three-year contract under Governor Kathy Hochul lasting from 2023-2026.

President Spence was re-elected to an unprecedented fourth term in 2024, winning re-election with over 66% of the vote.

== Political activity ==
Although PEF was politically active in the first eight years of its existence, it was not notably so. That changed in 1986, the first time the Public Employees Federation engaged in an organized, statewide legislative lobbying effort (it sought passage of a "toxic tort" bill which would permit individuals harmed by exposure to toxic substances a longer period of time to file a lawsuit to recover damages). PEF also contributed $150,000 to state political campaigns in the first six months of 1986, ranking it among the top PACs in the state. This was more money than PEF had contributed in all of 1984 (the previous election cycle). PEF quickly became noted for the amount of money it spent on election efforts and on campaigns to oppose legislation it disagreed with. In 1987, PEF spent $36,822 on state political party-building efforts, more than any other group in New York State. In 1988, PEF spent $570,841 on political campaigns—behind only the New York State AFL–CIO ($1 million), the Civil Service Employees Association ($704,875), and the Medical Society of the State of New York ($695,275). PEF spent $25,000 on an advertising campaign in the spring of 1990 to fight a plan to privatize state mental health services. In 1991, PEF spent $200,000 on an advertising campaign to defeat reductions in the state workforce and another $150,000 to support incumbents in state legislative election campaigns. It also spent at least $1 million that year on television ads urging the state legislature to pass higher state income and sales taxes. In 1995, PEF ranked third among PACs in spending on state-level elections in New York, pumping $419,928 into these races. In 2006, newly elected PEF President Kenneth Brynien, who had been a PEF vice-president for three years and chairman of PEF's political action committee for nine years, pledged to further boost PEF's political influence.

PEF has also been active in endorsing candidates for political office. But some of these endorsements have proven highly contentious within the union. In 1990, PEF endorsed Mario Cuomo for governor, but the endorsement was bitterly debated within the union and the support PEF pledged to Cuomo's re-election effort was considered "tepid". PEF remained neutral in Cuomo's 1994 re-election campaign. Cuomo was defeated for re-election by George Pataki. PEF remained neutral again during Pataki's successful 1998 re-election bid. But in 2002, PEF supported Pataki for election to a third term. According to PEF President Roger Benson, the endorsement was a quid pro quo for Pataki's promise to add three days of paid sick leave to the union's collective bargaining agreement and for a promise not to lay off any state workers in the following budget year. Some PEF members were deeply angered by the union's endorsement, however, and an internal union poll of the union's health care division showed they overwhelmingly supported Pataki's opponent (New York Comptroller H. Carl McCall). Pro-McCall members of the union submitted a resolution to the union's annual convention which would have rescinded the endorsement. PEF members voted down the resolution on October 8, 2002. In 2006, PEF endorsed New York State Attorney General Eliot Spitzer in his successful run for governor. That same year, Andrew Cuomo ran to replace Spitzer as New York State Attorney General. PEF declined to endorse Cuomo, instead backing New York City Public Advocate Mark Green in his unsuccessful bid for that office. On July 21, 2009, PEF leaders indicated they might not support David Paterson in the Democratic primary if he chooses to run for re-election as governor.

== PEF Presidents ==
The following is a list of PEF presidents:

- John Kraemer (1979–1982)
- Elizabeth Hoke (1982–1985)
- Rand Condell (1985–1991)
- Howard Schafer (1991–1994)
- James Sheedy (1994–1997)
- Roger Benson (1997–2006)
- Kenneth Brynien (2006–2012)
- Susan M. Kent (2012-2015)
- Wayne Spence (2015–present)
