= Charles J. MacGowan =

Scottish-born American labor union leader

Charles J. MacGowan (June 2, 1887 – October 25, 1960) was a Scottish-born American labor union leader.

Born in Argyllshire in Scotland, MacGowan emigrated to Canada with his father in 1897. In 1909, he began working as a boilermaker on the Grand Trunk Pacific Railroad, and soon joined the International Brotherhood of Boilermakers (IBB).

MacGowan emigrated to the United States in 1913, continuing to work as a boilermaker and remaining active in the IBB. From 1917, he worked full-time for the union. He later became assistant to the president of the Railway Employes' Department of the American Federation of Labor (AFL), and served on the Railroad Adjustment Board. In 1936, MacGowan was elected as a vice-president of the IBB, and then in 1944 as president of the union.

In 1945, Harry S. Truman appointed MacGowan to the Labor-Management Conference. He was also a labor consultant at the founding conference of the United Nations. In 1947, he was additionally elected as a vice-president of the AFL.

MacGowan was a founder of the League for Political Education in 1948. In 1949, he attended the founding conference of the International Confederation of Free Trade Unions, and in 1951, he was the AFL delegate to the British Trades Union Congress. He retired as president of the IBB in 1954, but took a prominent role in the negotiations which merged the AFL into the new AFL-CIO, and continued as one of its vice-presidents.

Trade union offices
Preceded by Joseph A. Franklin	President of the International Brotherhood of Boilermakers; 1944–1954	Succeeded by William A. Calvin
Preceded by Joseph P. McGurdy; Alex Rose	American Federation of Labor delegate to the Trades Union Congress; 1951; With: Richard J. Gray	Succeeded by J. R. Stevenson; Richard F. Walsh
Preceded by William C. Doherty	Eleventh Vice-President of the American Federation of Labor; 1947–1949	Succeeded by Herman Winter
Preceded by David Dubinsky	Tenth Vice-President of the American Federation of Labor; 1949–1951	Succeeded by Herman Winter
Preceded by David Dubinsky	Ninth Vice-President of the American Federation of Labor; 1951–1953	Succeeded by Herman Winter
Preceded by David Dubinsky	Eighth Vice-President of the American Federation of Labor; 1953–1955	Succeeded by Federation merged
