= William McFetridge =

American labor leader (1893–1969)

William Lane McFetridge (November 28, 1893 – March 15, 1969) was an American labor leader and president of the Building Service Employees International Union (BSEIU), the precursor to the Service Employees International Union, from 1940 to 1960.

== Early life and union career ==
McFetridge was born in Chicago, Illinois, to William F. and Wilhelmina (Quesse) McFetridge. He had a younger sister named Dorothy. He attended public school until he was 13 years old, when he quit to become an office boy and then clerk for the Milwaukee Road railway line. McFetridge was a nephew of William Quesse, the BSEIU's founding president. In time, attending night classes, he graduated from high school and earned a law degree.

As a young man, McFetridge was hired by his uncle as an investigator with the Flat Janitors Local 1 in Chicago. He was elected local president in 1923, and in 1927 was elected Third Vice President of BSEIU. He rose to First Vice President in 1930.

When BSEIU president Jerry Horan died in April 1937, McFetridge was the most senior local union president and widely considered a front-runner for the presidency. But Thomas Burke, another Chicago local union president, had the backing of the Chicago mob. McFetridge's candidacy threatened to split the union, as several BSEIU board members were aware of Burke's extensive and close ties to organized crime. George Scalise, president of a small BSEIU local of window washers in New York City and the international's representative on the East Coast, emerged as a compromise candidate. Scalise's mob ties were strong but not as public, and he had the backing of New York City mobster Anthony Carfano. Hesitant BSEIU executive board members elected Scalise after being intimidated and coerced by members of the Nitti gang.

== BSEIU presidency ==
McFetridge was elected president of the international union in 1940 after Scalise was indicted and convicted of bribery, embezzlement and labor racketeering.

Once president, McFetridge instituted modern financial and record-keeping practices at the international union's headquarters. He also undertook a large-scale organizing program, expanding out of the union's traditional base in apartments and office buildings and into airports, nuclear power plants, hospitals, and schools. He created research, legislative affairs, and legal departments, and began publishing a union-wide newsletter. During his tenure, the BSEIU grew from 70,000 members to 275,000 members.

A long-time Democrat, McFetridge became a Republican in 1948 and supported Thomas E. Dewey's run for the presidency. He later supported Dwight D. Eisenhower for president in 1952. Nevertheless, McFetridge was a very close friend of Chicago mayor Richard J. Daley, and nominated him for mayor in 1954. McFetridge became one of the most important behind-the-scenes players in Chicago under Daley.

In 1950, McFetridge was elected a vice-president of the American Federation of Labor (AFL). After the AFL and the Congress of Industrial Organizations merged in 1955, McFetridge was elected a vice-president of the AFL-CIO. Although a close ally of Teamsters president Dave Beck, he was also a strong advocate of strict financial practices and worked to cleanse AFL-CIO unions of labor racketeering.

== Retirement and death ==
McFetridge retired as president of BSEIU in 1960, and was succeeded by David Sullivan. He returned to Local 1 and was elected the union's president. He continued to assert effective control over BSEIU from Local 1, however. He engaged in a long-running and vicious jurisdictional dispute with George Fairchild, president of BSEIU Local 4. McFetridge was a strong advocate of the Marina City mixed-use development in Chicago, which he believed would provide numerous jobs for Local 1 members. McFetridge asked that BSEIU invest pension funds in the development, a plan which Fairchild and Sullivan opposed. Although he won BSEIU backing for the Marina City development, McFetridge lost control of BSEIU to Sullivan. He retired as Local 1 president shortly thereafter. He maintained his position on the AFL-CIO Executive Council until 1965.

McFetridge died on March 15, 1969, at Michael Reese Hospital in Chicago.

== Chicago recognition ==
- A short lakefront street in Chicago is named William E. McFetridge Drive. It separates the Museum Campus from Soldier Field, and the latter's street address was once 465 E. McFetridge (it is now 1 S. Museum Dr.).
- The Chicago Park District, of which McFetridge was president in 1968 and vice president from 1946 to 1968, is named McFetridge Sports Complex for him . Also known as McFetridge Ice Arena, it is the home rink for the DePaul University ice hockey team.

== Notes ==
Trade union offices
Preceded by George Scalise	President of Service Employees International Union; 1940-1960	Succeeded by David Sullivan
Preceded by Daniel W. Tracy	Thirteenth Vice-President of the American Federation of Labor; 1949–1951	Succeeded by James Petrillo
Preceded by Daniel W. Tracy	Twelfth Vice-President of the American Federation of Labor; 1951–1953	Succeeded by James Petrillo
Preceded by Daniel W. Tracy	Eleventh Vice-President of the American Federation of Labor; 1953–1954	Succeeded by James Petrillo
Preceded by Daniel W. Tracy	Tenth Vice-President of the American Federation of Labor; 1954–1955	Succeeded by Federation merged
