= Arnold Zander =

American labor union leader (1901–1975)

- Born: November 26, 1901; Two Rivers, Wisconsin, U.S.
- Died: July 21, 1975 (aged 73)
- Education: Labor union leader

Arnold Scheuer Zander (November 26, 1901 – July 21, 1975) was an American labor union leader.

Born in Two Rivers, Wisconsin, Zander studied civil engineering at the University of Wisconsin–Madison, then worked as a draftsman. Three years later, he returned to the university and completed a master's degree in town planning, followed by a PhD in public administration.

Zander began working for the Wisconsin Civil Service Department as an examiner, then later became the state personnel administrator. In 1932, he was a founding member of the Wisconsin State Employees Association, becoming its secretary in 1934. In 1936, the union became the American Federation of State, County and Municipal Employees, and Zander was elected as its president.

The union grew rapidly under Zander's leadership, reaching 162,000 members by 1956. However, after that point, many union members felt that it made little further progress, and in 1964, Zander was defeated for re-election by Jerry Wurf, becoming honorary president. Soon after, he revealed that the union's international activities had been financed by the Central Intelligence Agency. He retired fully in 1966.

In 1966/67, Zander was president of the United World Federalists, in which role he argued for the creation of a world police force, to keep peace during the Vietnam War. In 1968, he moved to Green Bay, Wisconsin, and taught at the University of Wisconsin–Green Bay.

Trade union offices
Preceded by New position	President of the American Federation of State, County and Municipal Employees; 1936–1964	Succeeded by Jerry Wurf
Preceded by Edward J. Brown; Thomas Kennedy	American Federation of Labor delegate to the Trades Union Congress; 1947; With: George J. Richardson	Succeeded by Patrick E. Gorman; Edward J. Volz
