= James Petrillo =

American trade union leader (1892–1984)

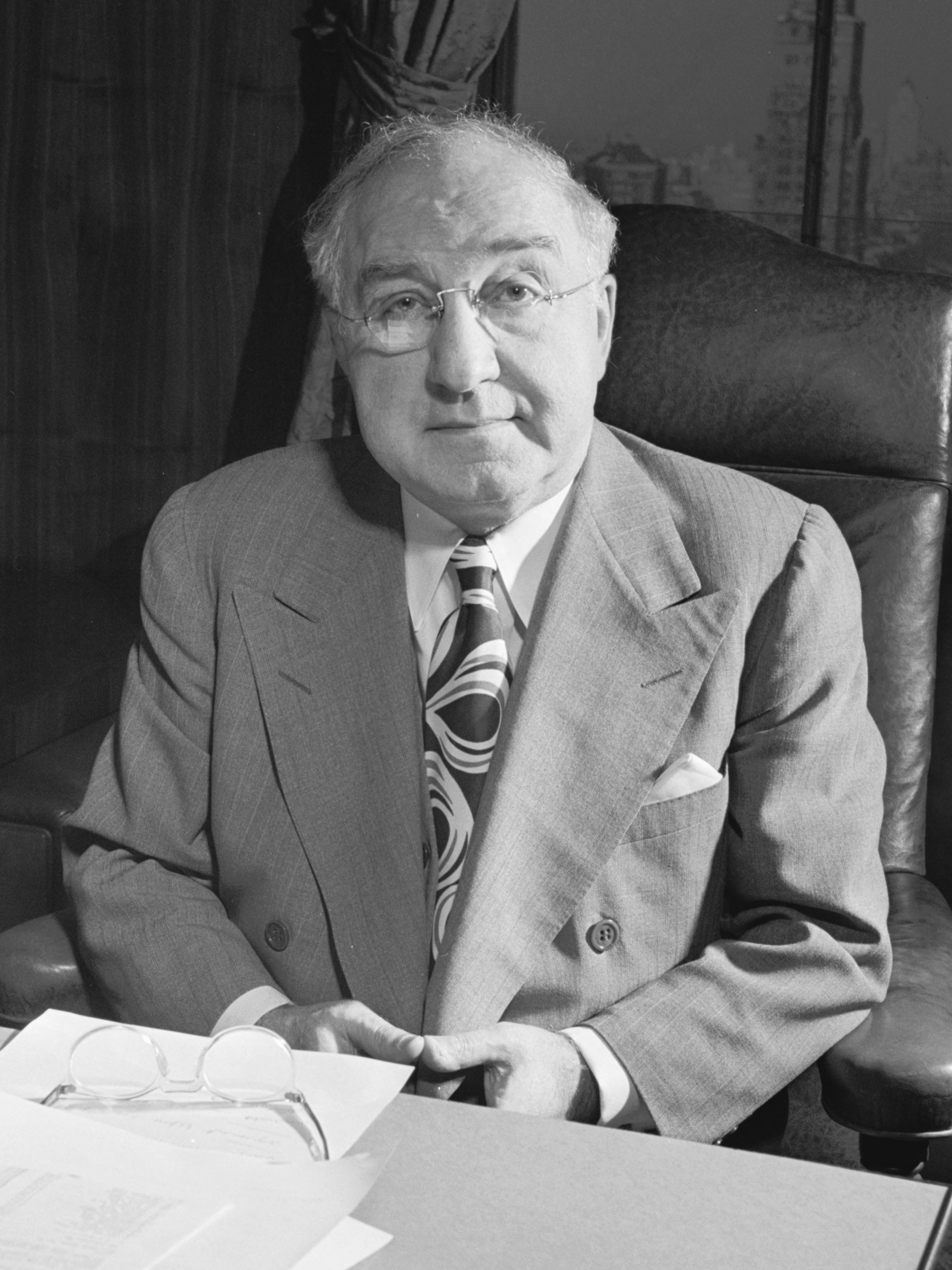
Portrait by William P. Gottlieb c. 1947

James Caesar Petrillo (March 16, 1892 – October 23, 1984) was an American musician and music activist best known for his association with the American Federation of Musicians, where he served as the labor union's president from 1940 to 1958.

== Biography ==
Petrillo was born in Chicago, Illinois, United States. Though, in his youth, Petrillo played the trumpet, he finally made a career out of organizing musicians into the union starting in 1919.

Petrillo became president of the Chicago Local 10 of the musician's union in 1922, and was president of the American Federation of Musicians from 1940 to 1958. Petrillo stepped down as president in 1958.

The round-faced, bespectacled Petrillo dominated the union with absolute authority. His most significant actions were banning all commercial recordings by union members from 1942–1944 and again in 1948 to pressure record companies to improve royalty payments to musicians. These were called the "Petrillo bans".

== Radio ==
Petrillo joined the orchestra at WBBM in Chicago, Illinois, in 1937. For a decade, he had been assistant conductor and orchestra member at three Chicago theaters. In 1940, he became the conductor of the WBBM orchestra. In 1943, he was promoted to music director at WBBM, "supervising all live and recorded music on the station". His orchestra was featured on the CBS program Make Mine Music that debuted in May 1948.

== Death ==
Petrillo died October 23, 1984, at St. Joseph Hospital in Chicago. He was 92.

== In popular culture ==
Petrillo was unique among AFM presidents in that he was well known to the US and Canadian general public, especially during and after the 1942–1944 recording ban and was frequently referenced in pop culture of that era. For example, Phil Harris, the band leader on the Jack Benny radio show, claims on the show to have been married to his wife, Alice Faye, by Petrillo. When Jack Benny asks how Petrillo could do this, Harris replies "Why not? My dues was paid up!" On another occasion Rochester is asked to blow the car horn by putting it in his mouth, and he replies "Petrillo won't let me!" After Harris helped his children with their homework, the teacher had to correct his work. According to his daughter, "Teacher said George Washington was our first president, not Petrillo."

In the 1945 Crosby/Bergman film, The Bells of St. Mary's, when Crosby's character, Father O'Malley, is asked how he was successful in tracking down a long-missing musician, he points to the sky and quips, "I went straight to the top—Petrillo!"

In 1945 or 1946, Robertson Davies had his "alter ego" write in a newspaper column, later collected in The Diary of Samuel Marchbanks, "Then to a party, where I showed my prowess at those games where you have to fill out forms saying who Cain's wife was, and whether it was Lincoln or Petrillo who said 'We must save the Union at all costs.'"

On the Fred Allen show of October 13, 1946, during a satire of radio advertising set to the music of Gilbert and Sullivan's "The Mikado," Allen described an elaborate show involving hundreds of musicians in locations around the world, then lamented that it would all have to be called off. To the tune of "Tit-Willow," Allen sang,

In all the excitement, there's one thing we forgot:
Petrillo, Petrillo, Petrillo
First we must learn if we can or cannot from
Petrillo, Petrillo, Petrillo

If you want a musician to beat on a drum
Or a trumpet to toot or a banjo to strum
You can't do a single thing 'til you hear from
Petrillo, Petrillo, Petrillo

In the 1947 recording of "Huggin' And A Chalkin'" Johnny Mercer sings "...when I met another fella with some chalk in his hand coming around the other side (it was Patrillo)". In the 1947 Bob Hope film My Favorite Brunette, a man says an imaginary George Washington is playing the fife all night long, and Hope replies "Why don't you tell Petrillo about it." Jon and Sondra Steele referred to Petrillo as "Little Caesar" on the B-side of their 1948 hit, "My Happiness", on the song called "They All Recorded To Beat The Ban". A song based on the Mulberry Bush nursery rhyme, talking about the 1947-1948 ban.

The 1950 Warner Bros. animated short Hurdy-Gurdy Hare, starring Bugs Bunny, ends with Bugs making large amounts of money by having a monkey turn a street organ while a gorilla collects donations. Bugs quips, "I sure hope Petrillo doesn't hear about this!" (The 1948 strike was ongoing at the time Hurdy-Gurdy Hare was in production.)

In the 1950 burlesque revue Everybody's Girl, the comedians Bobby Faye and Leon DeVoe, playing anti-nudist street preachers, mention that the Devil has "two horns." DeVoe then jokes, "Two horns? Brother, we'll have to speak to Petrillo about that!"

On the November 12, 1950 radio broadcast of the NBC variety program The Big Show, Groucho Marx, hosting a parody of his game show You Bet Your Life, makes a joke about bandleader "Abe Lyman of Illinois" becoming president; Composer and bandleader Meredith Willson replies, "That must have been before Petrillo."; Groucho then quips, "Everything has been before Petrillo!"

Slim Gaillard's 1951 song "Federation Blues" (which is entirely about the musician's union) begins: "You may play an instrument and think that you're a killer / But you still ain't get nowhere till you see J.C. Petrilla."

In the 1952 film Road to Bali, Bob Hope shows Bing Crosby an instrument he's been using in his snake-charmer act. He quips, "Hey, I've been playing this flute all night. Have to clear it with Petrillo." There is a similar reference in the Hope picture My Favorite Brunette.

In the musical Sugar, two musicians witness the St. Valentine's Day Massacre. The gangsters are issued instructions to search for them in the song "Tear the Town Apart", which ends with "I'll call Petrillo".

Over the closing credits of many music and variety television shows in the 1950s, the announcer would read "All musicians on this program are members of the American Federation of Musicians, James C. Petrillo, President," or words to that effect.

The Petrillo Bandshell, in Chicago's Grant Park, is named after James Petrillo.

In the Lord Buckley riff "The Hip Gahn", there is a reference to "the Indian Petrillo" when the Indian people are planning a big musical party for Gandhi after independence is achieved.

== Notes ==
Trade union offices
Preceded by Joseph N. Weber	President of the American Federation of Musicians; 1940–1958	Succeeded by Herman D. Kenin
Preceded by William McFetridge	Thirteenth Vice-President of the American Federation of Labor; 1951–1953	Succeeded by Dave Beck
Preceded by William McFetridge	Twelfth Vice-President of the American Federation of Labor; 1953–1954	Succeeded by Dave Beck
Preceded by William McFetridge	Eleventh Vice-President of the American Federation of Labor; 1954–1955	Succeeded by Federation merged
