= Joseph D. Keenan =

American labor union leader

Joseph Daniel Keenan (November 5, 1896 – July 22, 1984) was an American labor union leader.

Born in Chicago, Keenan completed an apprenticeship as an electrician and joined the International Brotherhood of Electrical Workers (IBEW). In 1923, he was elected as an inspector for his local union, and then in 1926 as recording secretary. He was also elected as secretary of the Chicago Federation of Labor.

During World War II, Keenan served on the National Defense Council and with the Office of Production Management, and was appointed as associated director of the War Production Board. In 1945, he became manpower director of the Allied Commission in Germany. He then returned to the Chicago Federation of Labor as secretary.

In 1948, Keenan became the founding director of the American Federation of Labor's (AFL) Labor's League for Political Education. In the role, he worked with Jack Kroll of the Congress of Industrial Organizations to run a co-ordinated campaign for Harry S. Truman's re-election.

In 1951, Keenan was elected as secretary-treasurer of the Building and Construction Trade Department of the AFL. In 1954, he was instead elected as international secretary of the IBEW, and the following year he was additionally elected as a vice-president of the AFL. He served on the Democratic National Committee's committee on economic policy in 1957.

Keenan traveled widely to campaign for John F. Kennedy in the 1960 United States presidential election. He was rumored to be in line for a prominent position in Kennedy's administration, but was instead offered the ambassador position in New Zealand, which he turned down. He retired in 1976.

Trade union offices
Preceded by Herbert Rivers	Secretary-Treasurer of the Building and Construction Trade Department; 1951–1954	Succeeded by Frank Bonadio
Preceded by J. Scott Milne	Secretary of the International Brotherhood of Electrical Workers; 1954–1976	Succeeded by Ralph A. Legion
Preceded by J. Scott Milne	Fifteenth Vice-President of the American Federation of Labor; 1955	Succeeded by Federation merged
Preceded by William F. Schnitzler; Emil Rieve	AFL-CIO delegate to the Trades Union Congress; 1957; With: Walter P. Reuther	Succeeded by George McGregor Harrison; Jacob Potofsky
