= Daniel W. Tracy =

American labor union leader (1886–1955)

- Tracy in 1938

United States Assistant Secretary of Labor
- In office 1940–1946
- Preceded by: Charles V. McLaughlin
- Succeeded by: Keen Johnson

Personal details
- Born: Daniel William Tracy; April 7, 1886 Bloomington, Illinois, U.S.
- Died: March 22, 1955 (aged 68)
- Occupation: Labor union leader

Daniel William Tracy (April 7, 1886 – March 22, 1955) was an American labor union leader.

Born in Bloomington, Illinois, Tracy moved to Houston in 1910, where he became an electrician. Three years later, he joined the International Brotherhood of Electrical Workers (IBEW). He worked as a lineman and wireman until 1916, when he became business manager of two local unions. In 1920, he was elected as a vice-president of the international union.

In 1933, Tracy was elected as president of IBEW. As leader of the union, he strongly opposed the Congress of Industrial Organizations split from the American Federation of Labor (AFL). He attended the International Labour Organization (ILO) conference in Geneva in 1935, and was an advisor to Cordell Hull at the 1938 Pan-American Conference.

In 1940, Tracy left his union post to become Assistant Secretary of Labor. He served until 1946, when he became labor director of the ILO. In 1947, he was re-elected as president of the IBEW, also becoming a vice-president of the AFL. He retired in 1954, and died the following year.

Trade union offices
Preceded by Henry H. Broach	President of the International Brotherhood of Electrical Workers; 1933–1940	Succeeded by Edward J. Brown
Preceded by Edward J. Brown	President of the International Brotherhood of Electrical Workers; 1947–1954	Succeeded by J. Scott Milne
Preceded by John L. Lewis	Thirteenth Vice-President of the American Federation of Labor; 1947–1949	Succeeded by William McFetridge
Preceded by Herman Winter	Twelfth Vice-President of the American Federation of Labor; 1949–1951	Succeeded by William McFetridge
Preceded by Herman Winter	Eleventh Vice-President of the American Federation of Labor; 1951–1953	Succeeded by William McFetridge
Preceded by Herman Winter	Tenth Vice-President of the American Federation of Labor; 1953–1954	Succeeded by William McFetridge
Government offices
Preceded by Charles V. McLaughlin	Assistant Secretary of Labor; 1940–1946	Succeeded by Keen Johnson
