= Herman Winter =

American labor union leader (1885–1959)

Herman Winter (1885 – January 28, 1959) was an American labor union leader.

Born in Helena, Montana, Winter moved to Kansas City, Missouri at an early age. He became a baker, and joined the Bakery and Confectionery Workers International Union of America. In 1903, he was elected as secretary-treasurer of his union local, then in 1908, he was elected as business agent and chair of the Kansas City Central Labor Union.

In 1911, Winter was elected as vice-president of the international union, becoming secretary-treasurer in 1936, and president in 1943. In 1948, he was additionally elected as a vice-president of the American Federation of Labor (AFL). He retired from his posts with the Bakery Workers in 1950, but retained his AFL post, and when in 1955 it merged into the AFL-CIO, he was described as "regarded as a kind of father-confessor by those now in the leadership".

In 1957, the Bakery Workers union split over allegations of corruption by its president, James G. Cross. Winter argued that the allegations should be investigated, but had not been correctly raised with the union executive or conference. However, Curtis Sims counterclaimed that Winter had advised him not to raise the allegations, as he believed that he could not win over a majority of the executive. The union was expelled from the AFL, and Winter thereby lost his vice-president post. He died early in 1959.

Trade union offices
Preceded by Andrew Myrup	Secretary-Treasurer of the Bakery and Confectionery Workers International Union of America; 1936–1943	Succeeded by William F. Schnitzler
Preceded by Andrew Myrup	President of the Bakery and Confectionery Workers International Union of America; 1943–1950	Succeeded by William F. Schnitzler
Preceded by David Dubinsky	Twelfth Vice-President of the American Federation of Labor; 1947–1949	Succeeded by Daniel W. Tracy
Preceded by Charles J. MacGowan	Eleventh Vice-President of the American Federation of Labor; 1949–1951	Succeeded by Daniel W. Tracy
Preceded by Charles J. MacGowan	Tenth Vice-President of the American Federation of Labor; 1951–1953	Succeeded by Daniel W. Tracy
Preceded by Charles J. MacGowan	Ninth Vice-President of the American Federation of Labor; 1953–1955	Succeeded by Federation merged
