= Richard F. Walsh =

American labor unionist (1900–1992)

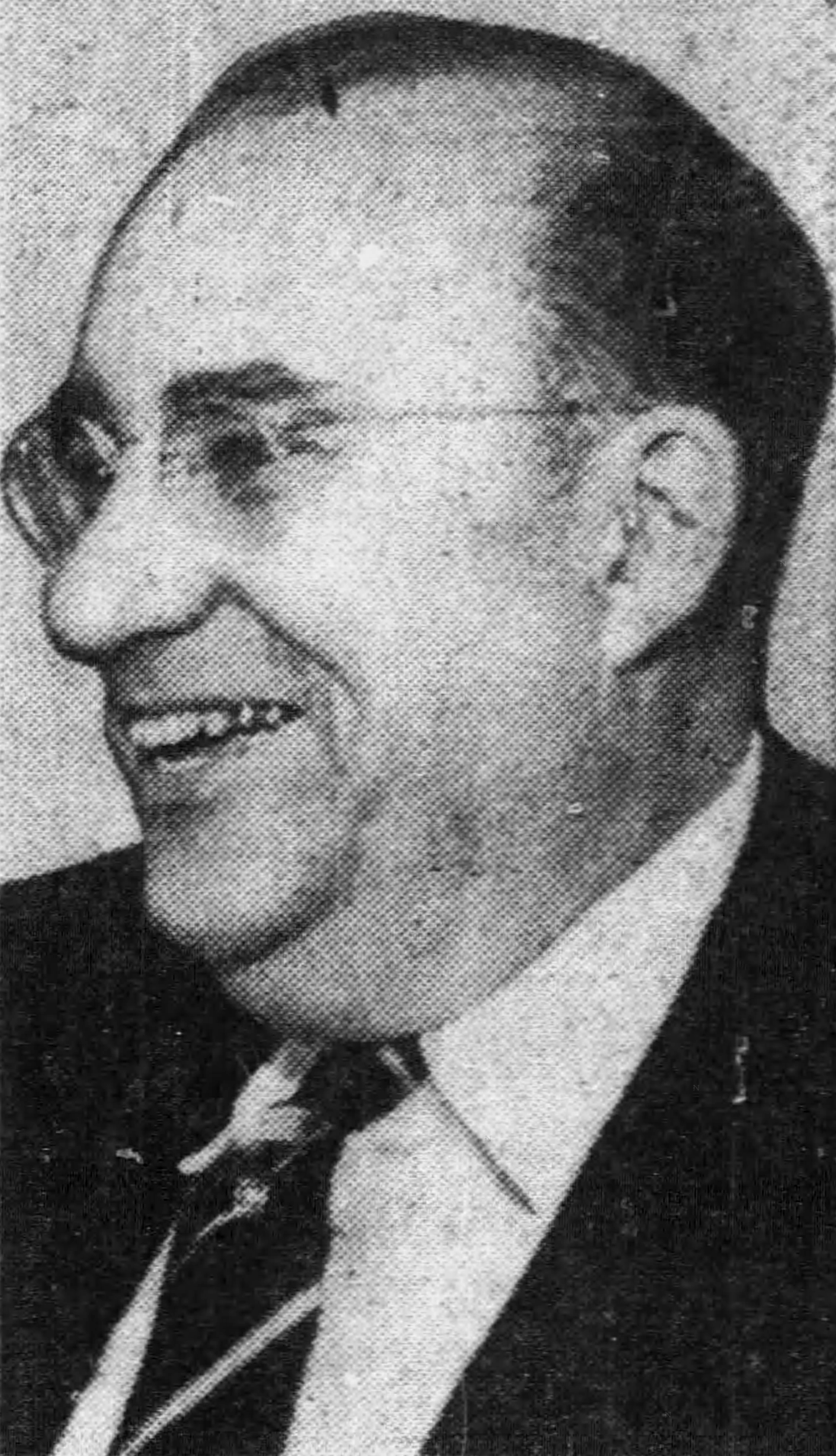
Walsh c. 1947

Richard Francis Walsh (February 20, 1900 – August 13, 1992) was an American labor unionist.

== Biography ==
Born on February 20, 1900, in Brooklyn, Walsh completed an apprenticeship as an electrician at the Fifth Avenue Theatre. He joined the International Alliance of Theatrical Stage Employees (IATSE) before, in 1923, moving to work at the Metropolitan Theater.

Walsh was elected as president of his union local in 1924, serving until 1926, when he became its business agent. In 1934, he was elected as a vice-president of the international union, and then in 1941 he became its president. He served as the American Federation of Labor's (AFL) delegate to the Trades and Labor Congress of Canada in 1948, and to the British Trades Union Congress in 1952.

In 1955, the AFL merged into the new AFL-CIO, and Walsh was elected as one of its vice-presidents. He also served as president of the Inter-American Federation of Entertainment Workers, and as a director of the Union Labor Life Insurance Company. He retired in 1974, and lived in Freeport, New York until his death on August 13, 1992, aged 92.

Trade union offices
Preceded by George E. Browne	President of the International Alliance of Theatrical Stage Employees; 1941–1974	Succeeded by Walter F. Diehl
Preceded by Richard J. Gray; Charles J. MacGowan	American Federation of Labor delegate to the Trades Union Congress; 1952; With: J. R. Stevenson	Succeeded by William A. Lee; J. Scott Milne
