= J. Scott Milne =

Canadian-born American labor union leader

J. Scott Milne (January 21, 1898 – July 20, 1955) was a Canadian-born American labor union leader.

Born in Vancouver, Milne served in the Canadian Army during World War I. After the war, he emigrate to the United States, settling in Portland, Oregon. There, he became an electrical lineman, and joined the International Brotherhood of Electrical Workers (IBEW). In 1923, he became business manager and financial secretary of his local union.

In 1929, Milne began working full-time for the international union. In 1936, he was elected as vice-president for the West Coast region. He was elected as secretary-treasurer of the union in 1947, also becoming editor of the union journal, Electrical Workers' Journal. He served as the American Federation of Labor's delegate to the British Trades Union Congress in 1953, and that year also became president of the International Labor Press of North America.

In 1954, Milne was elected as president of IBEW. He was also elected as a vice-president of the American Federation of Labor. In his spare time, he ran a dairy and bulb farm. He died there of a heart attack in 1955.

Trade union offices
Preceded by Gustave M. Bugniazet	Secretary of the International Brotherhood of Electrical Workers; 1947–1954	Succeeded by Joseph D. Keenan
Preceded by Daniel W. Tracy	President of the International Brotherhood of Electrical Workers; 1954–1955	Succeeded by Gordon M. Freeman
Preceded by J. R. Stevenson; Richard F. Walsh	American Federation of Labor delegate to the Trades Union Congress; 1953; With: William A. Lee	Succeeded by Paul L. Phillips; James Suffridge
Preceded by Al J. Hayes	Fifteenth Vice-President of the American Federation of Labor; 1954–1955	Succeeded by Joseph D. Keenan
