= Richard J. Gray =

American labor unionist

Richard J. Gray (December 6, 1887 – May 1, 1966) was an American labor unionist.

Born in Albany, New York, Gray followed his father in becoming a bricklayer. In 1903, he joined the Bricklayers', Masons' and Plasterers' International Union of America. He worked on constructing the Panama Canal, then returned to Albany, where he became president of his local union, and later its business manager.

In 1927, Gray became an examiner for the New York State Education Department. He returned to the union in 1928, becoming its international treasurer, also becoming a director of the Union Labor Life Insurance Company. In 1936, he won election as international secretary of the union, and in 1937 additionally treasurer of the insurance company.

Gray strongly supported craft unionism, and was a leading advocate of the American Federation of Labor (AFL) in its disputes with the new Congress of Industrial Organizations. During World War II, he served on the War Labor Board. In 1946, he was elected as president of the Building and Construction Trade Department of the AFL. In 1951, he was the AFL's delegate to the British Trades Union Congress. However, his support for the Republican Party and McCarthyism gradually alienated the rest of the labor movement, and in 1960 he was compelled to resign his union posts.

Trade union offices
Preceded by John J. Gleeson	Secretary of the Bricklayers', Masons' and Plasterers' International Union of America; 1936–1946	Succeeded by John J. Murphy
Preceded by John Coyne	President of the Building and Construction Trade Department; 1946–1960	Succeeded by C. J. Haggerty
Preceded by Joseph P. McGurdy; Alex Rose	American Federation of Labor delegate to the Trades Union Congress; 1951; With: Charles J. MacGowan	Succeeded by J. R. Stevenson; Richard F. Walsh
