= William A. Calvin =

Canadian-born American labor union leader

William Austin Calvin (February 5, 1898 – January 27, 1962) was a Canadian-born American labor union leader.

Born in Saint John, New Brunswick, Calvin became a boilermaker, working on the Canadian Pacific Railway. He joined the International Brotherhood of Boilermakers in 1914, but in 1915 joined the Canadian Army, serving during World War I. He was wounded in combat and as a result was not able to return to his trade until 1919.

After the war, Calvin emigrated to the United States, settling in Florida. There, he worked for the Seaboard Airline Railroad, and in 1924 he was elected as president of his union local. In 1929, he won election as a vice-president of the international union, and then in 1933, he became secretary-treasurer of the Metal Trades Department of the American Federation of Labor. He served on various government boards, and helped draft the Merchant Marine Act of 1936.

Calvin left the Metal Trades Department in 1940 to work full-time for the boilermakers union. In 1951, he moved to work for the National Production Authority, but he returned to the boilermakers in 1953, to become the assistant to president Charles J. MacGowan. In 1954, he succeeded MacGowan as president. In 1958, he visited Latin America on behalf of the United States Department of State, and then in 1959 he represented the AFL-CIO at the conference of the Indian National Trade Union Congress.

Calvin also served as director of the Fund for Peaceful Atomic Development, and on the Railway Labor Executives' Association. In 1961, he was elected as a vice-president and executive council member of the AFL-CIO. However, he died of a heart attack early the following year, while still in office.

Trade union offices
Preceded by John P. Frey	Secretary-Treasurer of the Metal Trades Department; 1933–1940	Succeeded by Joseph S. McDonagh
Preceded by Charles J. MacGowan	President of the International Brotherhood of Boilermakers; 1954–1962	Succeeded by Russell K. Berg
