= George Meany =

American labor leader (1894–1980)

- Meany c. 1950–1956

1st President of the AFL–CIO
- In office December 4, 1955 – November 19, 1979
- Preceded by: Office established
- Succeeded by: Lane Kirkland

5th President of the American Federation of Labor
- In office November 25, 1952 – December 4, 1955
- Preceded by: William Green
- Succeeded by: Office abolished

2nd Secretary-Treasurer of the American Federation of Labor
- In office October 12, 1939 – November 25, 1952
- Preceded by: Frank Morrison
- Succeeded by: William F. Schnitzler

President of the New York State Federation of Labor
- In office August 29, 1934 – October 12, 1939
- Preceded by: Emanuel Koveleski
- Succeeded by: Thomas J. Lyons

Personal details
- Born: William George Meany; August 16, 1894 New York City, U.S.
- Died: January 10, 1980 (aged 85) Washington, D.C., U.S.
- Resting place: Gate of Heaven Cemetery
- Spouse: Eugenia McMahon Meany
- Occupation: Labor leader

William George Meany (August 16, 1894 – January 10, 1980) was an American labor union administrator for 57 years. He was a vital figure in the creation of the AFL–CIO and served as its first president, from 1955 to 1979.

Meany, the son of a union plumber, became a plumber himself at a young age. Within a decade, he was a full-time union official. As an officer of the American Federation of Labor, he represented the AFL on the National War Labor Board during World War II. He held the position of AFL president from 1952 to 1955.

In 1952, Meany proposed a merger of the AFL with the Congress of Industrial Organizations (CIO). He managed the negotiations until the merger was completed in 1955, creating the largest federation of unions in the United States. He was AFL–CIO president for the next 24 years.

Meany had a reputation for integrity and consistent opposition to corruption in the labor movement, and strong anti-communism. He was one of the best-known union leaders in the U.S. during the mid-20th century.

== Early years ==
Meany was born into a Roman Catholic family in Harlem, New York City on August 16, 1894, the second of 10 children. His parents were Michael Meany and Anne Cullen Meany, who were both American-born and of Irish descent. His ancestors had immigrated to the United States during the 1850s. His father was a plumber and served as president of his plumber's union local. Michael Meany was also a precinct level activist in the Democratic Party.

Meany grew up in the Port Morris neighborhood of The Bronx, where his parents had relocated when he was five years old. Always called "George", he learned that his real first name was William only when he got a work permit as a teenager. Meany quit high school at age 16 to become a plumber like his father, beginning work as a plumber's helper. He then served a five-year apprenticeship as a plumber and got his journeyman's certificate in 1917, with Local 463 United Association of Plumbers and Steamfitters of the United States and Canada.

His father died of heart failure in 1916 after a bout of pneumonia. When Meany's older brother joined the U.S. Army in 1917, George became the sole source of income for his mother and six younger siblings. He supplemented his income for a while by playing as a semiprofessional baseball catcher. In 1919, he married Eugenia McMahon, a garment worker and a member of the International Ladies Garment Workers Union. They had three daughters.

== Beginning of union career in New York ==
In 1920, Meany was elected to the executive board of Local 463 of the Plumber's Union. In 1922, he became a full-time business agent for the local, which had 3,600 members at that time. Meany later stated that he had never walked a picket line during his plumber's union days, explaining that his original plumber's union never needed to picket, because the employers never attempted to replace the workers.

In 1923, he was elected secretary of the New York City Building Trades Council, the city federation of unions representing construction workers. He won a court injunction against an industry lockout in 1927, which was then considered an innovative tactic for a union, and was opposed by many of the older union administrators.

In 1934, he became president of the New York State Federation of Labor, the statewide coalition of trade unions. During his first year of lobbying in Albany, the state capital, 72 bills that he promoted to the state legislature were enacted into law, and he developed a close working relationship with Governor Herbert H. Lehman.

He developed a reputation for honesty, diligence and the ability to testify effectively before legislative hearings and to speak well to the press. In 1936, he cofounded the American Labor Party, a pro-union political party active in New York, along with David Dubinsky and Sidney Hillman, partly to organize support among union socialists for the re-election that year of President Franklin D. Roosevelt and mayor Fiorello La Guardia .

== National leadership in Washington, DC ==
Three years later, he relocated to Washington, D.C., to become national secretary-treasurer of the American Federation of Labor, where he served AFL president William Green. During World War II, Meany was one of the permanent representatives of the AFL to the National War Labor Board. During the war, he established close relationships with prominent anticommunists in the American labor movement, including David Dubinsky, Jay Lovestone and Matthew Woll. In October 1945, he organized the AFL boycott of the founding conference of the World Federation of Trade Unions, which welcomed participation by labor unions from the USSR and was later called a communist front.

The labor strikes of 1945-1946, which were organized to a large extent by CIO unions, resulted in passage of the Taft Hartley Act in 1947, which was perceived widely as anti-union. One provision required union officials to sign loyalty oaths affirming that they were not communists; this had a major effect on the CIO unions. Meany, in opposition to John L. Lewis and other leftist union leaders, replied that he would "go further and sign an affidavit that I was never a comrade to the comrades" since he had always ostracized communists. Within a year, most U.S. union administrators unaffiliated with the Communist Party signed the affidavit, later upheld by the Supreme Court, which ruled in 1949 that the Communist Party was unique among American political parties in swearing allegiance to a foreign power.

== Merger of AFL and CIO ==
When Green's health began failing in 1951, Meany gradually assumed day-to-day operations of the AFL. He became president of the American Federation of Labor in 1952 upon Green's death.

Meany quickly took effective control of the AFL, and proposed to merge with the CIO. It took longer for Walter Reuther to complete his control of the CIO, but when he did he became a willing partner in the merger negotiations.

It took Meany three years to negotiate the merger, and he had to overcome significant opposition. John L. Lewis of the United Mine Workers termed the merger a "rope of sand", and his union refused to join the AFL–CIO. Jimmy Hoffa, second in command of the Teamster's Union, protested, "What's in it for us? Nothing!" However, the Teamsters complied with the merger initially. Mike Quill, president of the Transport Workers Union of America also fought the merger, saying that it amounted to a capitulation to the "racism, racketeering and raiding" of the AFL.

Fearing a drawn-out negotiation process, Meany decided on a "short route" to reconciliation. This meant all AFL and CIO unions would be accepted into the new organization "as is", with all conflicts and overlaps to be sorted out after the merger. Meany further relied on a small, select group of advisors to craft the necessary agreements. The draft constitution was written primarily by AFL Vice President Matthew Woll and CIO General Counsel Arthur Goldberg, while the joint policy statements were written by Woll, CIO Secretary-Treasurer James Carey, CIO vice presidents David McDonald and Joseph Curran, Brotherhood of Railway Clerks President George McGregor Harrison, and Illinois AFL–CIO President Reuben Soderstrom.

Meany's efforts came to fruition in December 1955 with a joint convention in New York City that merged the two federations, creating the AFL–CIO, with Meany elected as president. Termed Meany's "greatest achievement" by Time magazine, the new federation had 15 million members. Only two million US workers were members of unions remaining outside the AFL–CIO.

== Campaigns against corrupt unions ==
In 1953, the International Longshoremen's Association, accused of racketeering, was expelled from the AFL, an early example of Meany's efforts against corruption and organized crime in unions. After internal reform, it was readmitted to the now-merged AFL–CIO, in 1959.

Meany also fought corruption in the AFL affiliated United Textile Workers of America from 1952. In 1957, he reported that the president of that union had been stealing more than $250,000. Meany also appointed an independent monitor to oversee reform of the union.

Concerns about corruption and the influence of organized crime in the International Brotherhood of Teamsters, managed by Dave Beck, caused Meany to begin a campaign to reform that union in 1956. In 1957, amidst a fight for control of the union with Jimmy Hoffa, Beck was called before the United States Senate Select Committee on Improper Activities in Labor and Management, commonly known as the "McClellan Committee" after its chairman John Little McClellan, of Arkansas.

Televised hearings during early 1957 exposed misconduct by both the Beck and the Hoffa factions of the Teamsters Union. Both Hoffa and Beck were indicted, but Hoffa won control of the Teamsters. In response, the AFL–CIO instituted a policy that no union official who had taken the Fifth Amendment during a corruption investigation could continue in a leadership position. Meany told the Teamsters that they could continue as members of the AFL–CIO if Hoffa resigned as president. Hoffa refused, and the Teamsters were ousted from the AFL–CIO on December 6, 1957. Meany endorsed the AFL–CIO's adoption of a code of ethics, after the scandal.

Meany also organized campaigns against organized crime and corruption in the International Jewelry Workers Union, the Laundry Workers International Union, the AFL Distillery Workers, the AFL United Auto Workers, and the Bakery and Confectionery Workers International Union. He demanded the dismissal of corrupt union officials and internal reorganization of the unions. When some unions resisted, he organized their expulsion from the AFL and later from the AFL–CIO, and he even established rival unions. He established an AFL–CIO Committee on Ethical Practices to investigate misconduct and insisted for unions being investigated to co-operate with its inquiries. According to John Hutchinson, a professor at UCLA, "few American union leaders have such a public record of repeated and explicit opposition to corruption".

== Vietnam War ==
Meany consistently defended President Lyndon B. Johnson's Vietnam War policies. In 1966, Meany insisted that AFL–CIO unions give "unqualified support" to Johnson's war policy. Among the labor officials at the time who opposed Meany's position on the war were Ralph Helstein of the United Packinghouse Workers of America, George Burdon of the United Rubber Workers, and Patrick Gorman of the Amalgamated Meat Cutters.

Charles Cogen, president of the American Federation of Teachers, joined the opposition when the 1967 AFL–CIO convention adopted a resolution pledging support for the war. Reuther stated that he was busy with negotiations with General Motors in Detroit and could not attend the convention. In his speech to the convention, Meany said regarding Vietnam that the AFL–CIO was "neither hawk nor dove nor chicken", but was supporting "brother trade unionists" struggling against Communism.

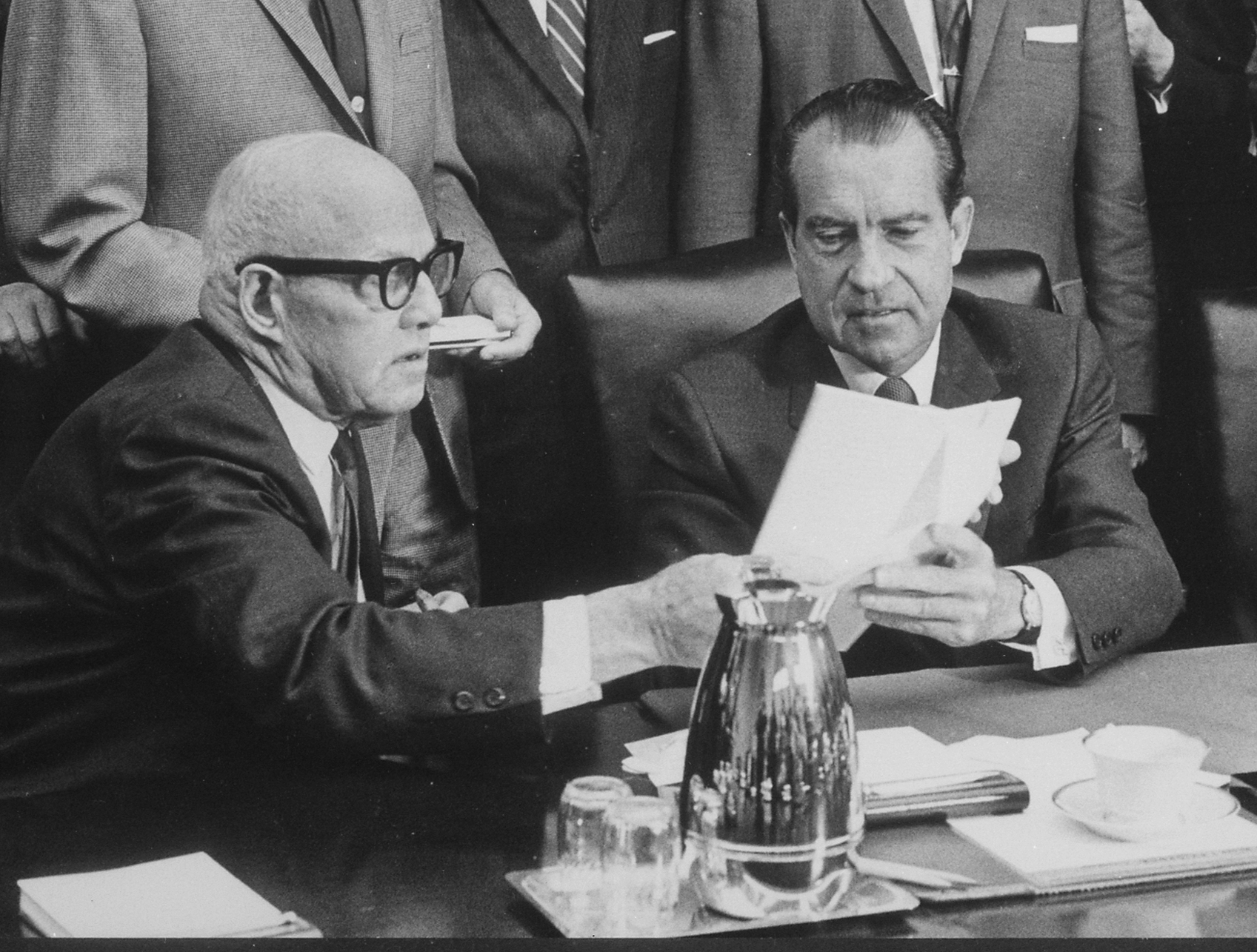
Meany meeting with Richard Nixon in 1969.

As an anticommunist who identified with the working class, Meany expressed contempt for the New Left. That philosophy had often criticized the labor activists for conservatism, racism, and anticommunism, and during the late 1960s and early 1970s, it included many promoters of Communism, such as the Viet Cong. In the aftermath of the violence by antiwar demonstrators and police at the 1968 Democratic National Convention, Meany sympathized with the police by terming the protesters a "dirtynecked and dirty-mouthed group of kooks".

Meany opposed the antiwar presidential candidacy of U.S. Senator George McGovern in 1972 against incumbent Richard Nixon, despite McGovern's generally pro-labor voting record in Congress. However, Meany also refused to endorse Nixon. On Face the Nation in September 1972, Meany criticized McGovern's foreign policy position—that the U.S. should respect other peoples' right to choose communism—by saying there had never been a country that had voted freely for communism. Meany accused McGovern of being "an apologist for the Communist world".

After Nixon's landslide defeat of McGovern, Meany said the American people had "overwhelmingly repudiated neo-isolationism" in foreign policy. Meany added that American voters had split their votes by endorsing the Democrats in Congress.

Meany's support for the war effort continued up until the final days before Saigon was captured by the North Vietnamese in April 1975. He called for President Gerald Ford to provide a U.S. Navy "flotilla" if it was needed to ensure that hundreds of thousands of "friends of the United States" could escape before a communist regime could be established.

He also appealed for the admission of the maximum possible number of Vietnamese refugees to the U.S. Meany blamed Congress for "washing its hands" of the war and for weakening South Vietnam's military, damaging its "will to fight". In particular, Meany accused Congress of failing to provide adequate funding for American troops to stage an orderly withdrawal.

== Conflict with Reuther ==
Despite their co-operation during the AFL–CIO merger, Meany and Reuther had a contentious relationship for many years. In 1963, Meany and Reuther disagreed about the March on Washington for Jobs and Freedom, a major event in the history of the U.S. civil rights movement. Meany opposed AFL–CIO endorsement of the march. In an AFL–CIO executive council meeting on August 12, 1963, Reuther's motion for a strong endorsement of the march was supported by only A. Philip Randolph of the Brotherhood of Sleeping Car Porters, the titular leader of the march. As a compromise, the AFL–CIO backed a civil rights law and allowed individual unions to endorse the march. When Meany heard Randolph's speech after the march, he was visibly moved. Thereafter, he supported the creation of the A. Philip Randolph Institute to strengthen labor unions among African Americans and to strengthen ties with the African-American community. Randolph said he was sure that Meany was morally opposed to racism.

At the time of the 1967 AFL–CIO convention, Reuther demanded that Meany make the AFL–CIO more democratic.

After years of disagreement with Meany, Reuther resigned from the AFL–CIO executive council in February 1967. In 1968, Reuther's UAW withdrew from the AFL–CIO, and the UAW did not re-affiliate with the AFL–CIO until 1981, long after Reuther's death in a 1970 airplane crash.

== Political goals ==
Amidst the Great Society reforms advocated by President Johnson, Meany and the AFL–CIO in 1965 endorsed a resolution calling for "mandatory congressional price hearings for corporations, a technological clearinghouse, and a national planning agency". American socialist Michael Harrington commented that the AFL–CIO had "initiated a programmatic redefinition that had much more in common with the defeated socialist proposal of 1894 than with the voluntarism of Gompers", referring to the founder of the AFL, who had openly opposed socialism for decades. The 1965 resolution was part of the AFL–CIO's ongoing endorsement of industrial democracy. Despite Meany's support for reform policies that were sometimes termed "socialist", he also emphasized that "I very much agree with the free market system". In the early 1970s, he spoke about the changes in union workers since the 1930s:

We no longer march on the streets, we no longer have the sitdown strikes, and labor to some extent has become middle class. In other words, when you have no property, you don't have anything, you have nothing to lose by these radical actions. But when you become a person who has a home and has property, to some extent you become conservative.

As AFL–CIO president, Meany supported increasing the minimum wage, increasing public works spending, and protecting union organizing rights. He also endorsed universal health care. While he was president, the AFL–CIO lobbied vigorously for its goals. He backed the two-party system, and believed in "supporting your friends and punishing your enemies".

== Later years and death ==
By the mid-1970s, Meany was past his 80th birthday and there were increasing calls for him to retire and pass the presidency of the AFL–CIO to a younger man. During his final years, Meany adopted amateur photography and painting as hobbies.

in June 1975 Meany as president of the AFL–CIO hosted Alexander Solzhenitsyn in his tour of the USA and had a dinner in Solzhenitsyn's honor where the Russian writer gave one of his most well known speeches. Meany himself gave the speech introducing Solzhenitsyn.

Meany's wife of 59 years, Eugenia, died in March 1979, and he became depressed after losing her. He injured his knee in a golfing mishap a few months before his death and was reliant on a wheelchair. In November 1979, he retired from the AFL–CIO, after a 57-year career in organized labor. He was succeeded by Lane Kirkland, who served as AFL–CIO president for the next 16 years.

Meany died at George Washington University Hospital on January 10, 1980, of cardiac arrest. The AFL–CIO had 14 million members at the time of his death. President Jimmy Carter termed him "an American institution" and "a patriot". He was interred at Gate of Heaven Cemetery in Silver Spring, Maryland.

== Awards, tributes and legacy ==
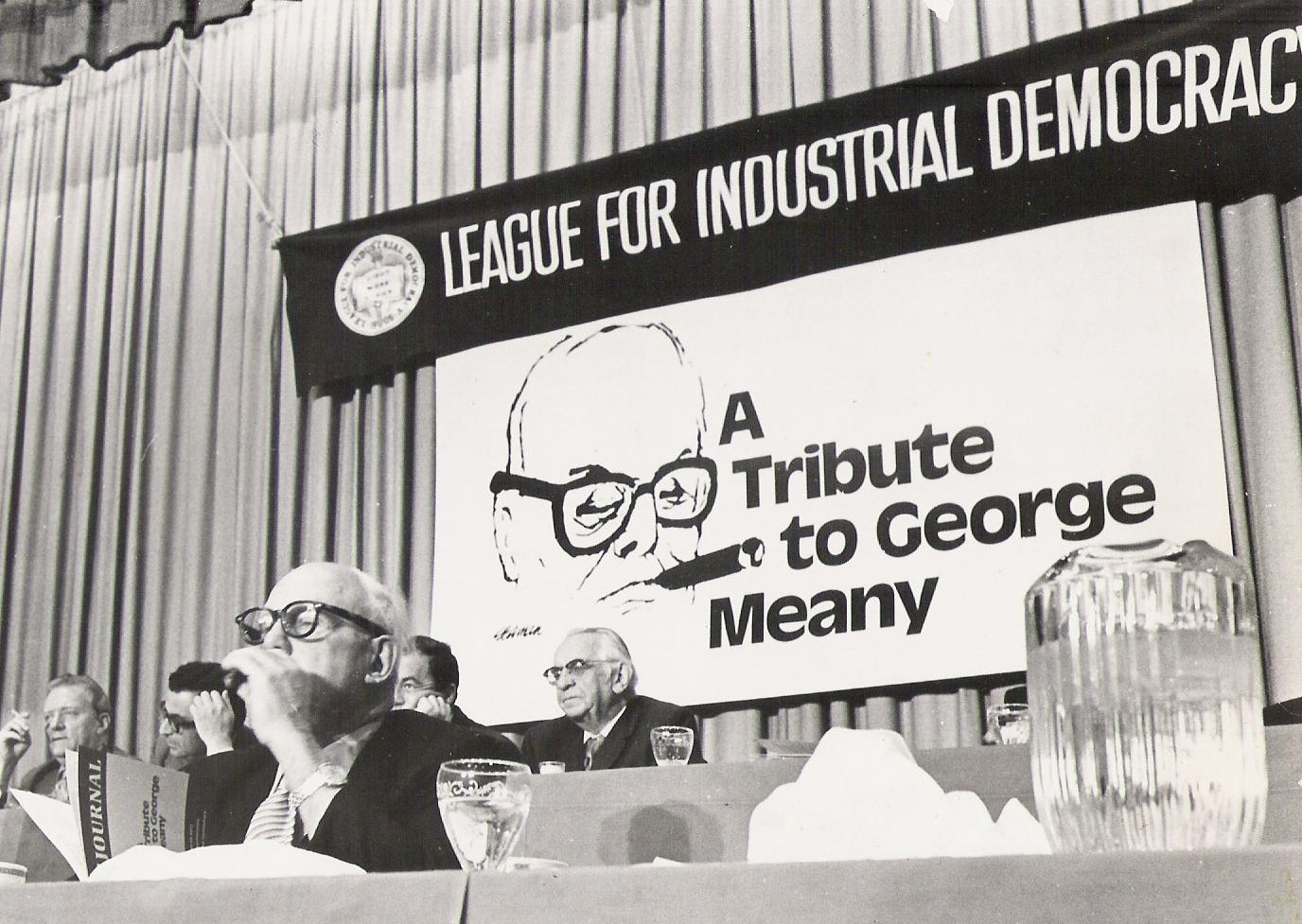
George Meany smoking a cigar, and a cigar also appears in the banner of the League for Industrial Democracy's "Tribute to George Meany".

President John F. Kennedy established the Presidential Medal of Freedom on February 22, 1963, but died before he could award it. Two weeks after Kennedy's assassination, President Lyndon Johnson awarded it to Meany and thirty others on December 6, 1963. Johnson said the award was for Meany's service to unionism and for advancing freedom throughout the world.

On November 6, 1974, Meany dedicated the George Meany Center for Labor Studies (founded 1969), which was renamed the National Labor College in 1997. From 1993 to 2013, the college housed the George Meany Memorial Archives. In 2013 the archival and library holdings were transferred to the University of Maryland libraries, making the university the official repository. The holdings date from the establishment of the AFL (1881), and offer almost complete records from the founding of the AFL–CIO (1955). Among the estimated 40 million documents are AFL–CIO Department records, trade department records, international union records, union programs, union organizations with allied or affiliate relationships with the AFL–CIO, and personal papers of union leaders. Extensive photo documentation of labor union activities from the 1940s to the present are in the photographic negative and digital collections. Additionally, collections of graphic images, over 10,000 audio tapes, several hundred movies and videotapes, and more than 2,000 artifacts are available for public research and study.

The George Meany Award was established by the Boy Scouts of America in 1974.

Books published about Meany include Meany: The Unchallenged Strong Man of American Labor (1972) and George Meany and His Times: A Biography (1981). Meany's entry in the biographical encyclopedia American National Biography was published in 2000, authored by historian David Brody.

Meany was known as a cigar smoker, and pictures of him often appeared in newspapers and magazines smoking a cigar.

On the 100th anniversary of his birth in 1994, Meany was pictured on a United States commemorative postage stamp.

He was interviewed by Krusty the Clown on an episode of The Simpsons.

== See also ==
- American Federation of Labor
- Argo features a scene about his death
- "Bart of Darkness", with a fictionalized cameo

Trade union offices
Preceded by Frank Morrison	Secretary-Treasurer of the American Federation of Labor; 1939–1952	Succeeded by William F. Schnitzler
Preceded by William Green	President of the American Federation of Labor; 1952–1955	Merged into AFL–CIO
New title AFL–CIO founded	President of the AFL–CIO; 1955–1979	Succeeded by Lane Kirkland
