= Mary Kay Henry =

American labor leader (born 1958)

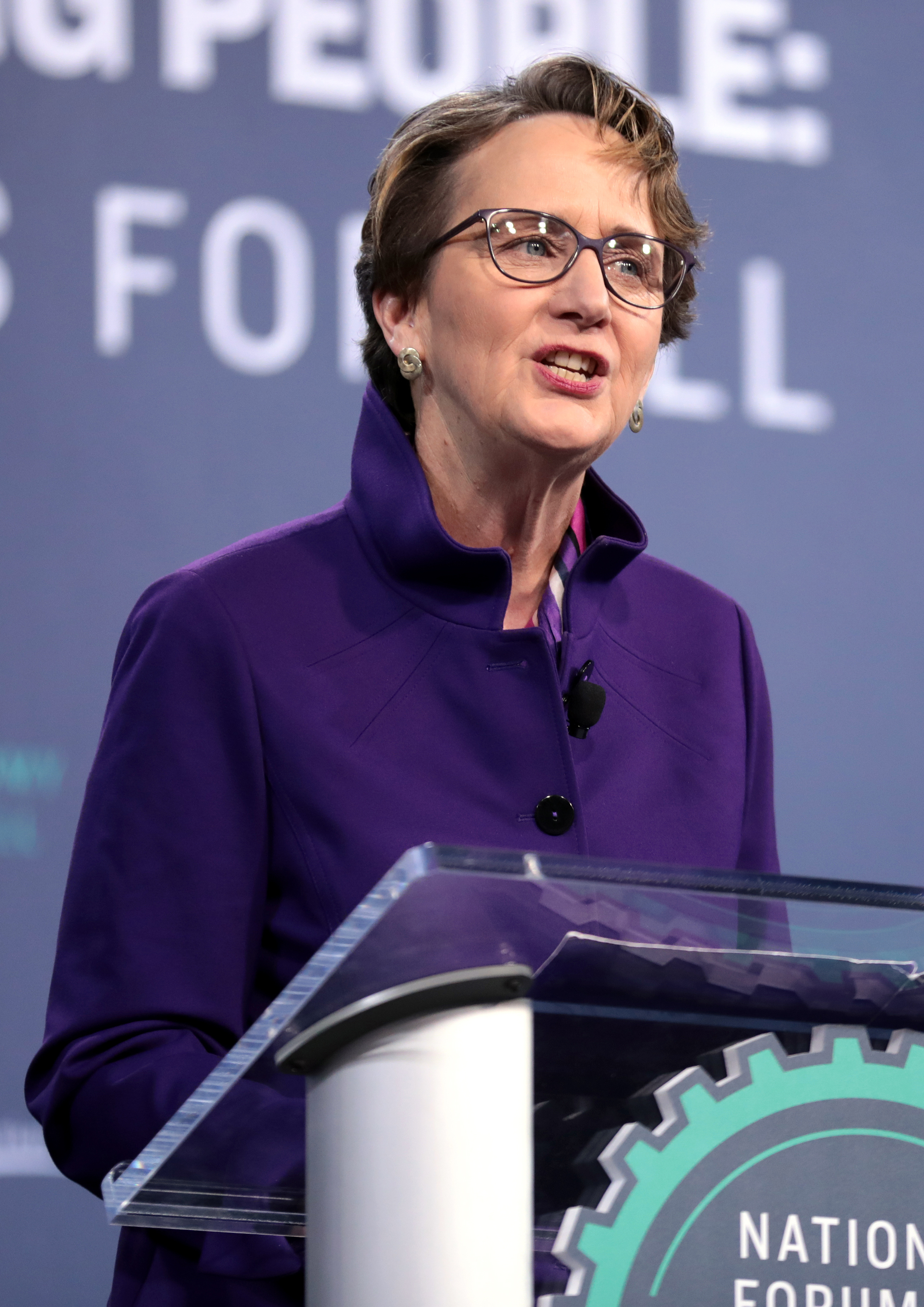
- Born: 1958 (age 67–68); Wayne County, Michigan, U.S.
- Education: Michigan State University (BA)
- Known for: President of the Service Employees International Union (2010-2024)

Mary Kay Henry (born 1958) is an American labor union activist who was International President of the Service Employees International Union (SEIU) from May 8, 2010 until her retirement on May 20, 2024. She was the first woman to lead the union. While serving with the union in California, she helped pioneer SEIU's use of card check agreements, non-traditional collective bargaining agreements, comprehensive campaigns, and system-wide health care organizing strategies. Henry was included on Time's 100 Most Influential People of 2020.

== Early life and education ==
Henry was born in 1958 in a suburb of Detroit, Michigan. Her father was a salesman and her mother was a teacher, and both were devout Catholics.

Henry credits her faith with giving her an interest in social justice issues. The oldest girl in a family of 10 children, she attended Marian High School in Bloomfield Hills, Michigan. She gained a favorable impression of labor unions from hearing and reading about the work of the United Auto Workers (UAW) in the heavily unionized automotive industry. She worked in a local hospital while in high school to earn money.

In college, Henry initially wanted to become an urban planner. She continued to work in hospitals as an undergraduate student, and also as a medical assistant for the American Red Cross. She earned her bachelor's degree from Michigan State University in 1979, majoring in urban planning and labor relations. While in college, she was a volunteer lobbyist for a grassroots group, and worked alongside union lobbyists on various issues.

== Union career ==
Her first job out of college was with the American Foreign Service distributing food stamps to the needy. When a member from the United Auto Workers suggested that the way to end hunger was to enable people to obtain well-paying jobs, Henry began considering union organizing. Henry joined SEIU as a researcher in 1980. Her experiences as a health care worker prompted her to work for a union that was involved in health care organizing. She joined SEIU because it was one of the few unions hiring women as organizers at the time. During the 1980s, Henry held 18 jobs within the SEIU in California. She served as the San Francisco-area strike coordinator during a 1986 strike by more than 9,000 clerks, certified nursing assistants, and technicians against 14 Kaiser Permanente hospitals and health care facilities throughout California. She helped pioneer SEIU's use of card check agreements, non-traditional collective bargaining agreements, and system-wide health care organizing strategy. In 1993, she was named director of the 475,000-member health care division of SEIU.

Henry was elected to SEIU's executive board in December 1995 after President John Sweeney resigned after his election as President of the AFL-CIO. SEIU President Andrew Stern named Henry his assistant for organizing in 1996. Henry was named assistant to then-SEIU Executive Vice President Eliseo Medina in 1998. She remained active in the union's health care organizing, however, representing SEIU in its talks in 1999 to secure a card check agreement with the Catholic Healthcare West hospital chain. More than 17,000 new members at 27 hospitals were organized under that agreement. She was also involved in SEIU's successful negotiations with Tenet Healthcare for a card check agreement.

She was named SEIU's Southern California organizing director in 2000, the international union's chief healthcare strategist in 2004, and elected an Executive Vice President of the union in 2004. Henry helped oversee what she said in 2005 was a $150 million organizing budget, which SEIU intended to use to organize more than 1 million additional nurses over the next decade. She helped negotiate a "no-raid agreement" between SEIU and the United American Nurses in 2006. In her first 25 years with SEIU, Henry played a major role in organizing drives at Beverly Enterprises, Catholic Health Care West, Tenet Healthcare, and HCA, Inc. Stern relied on her to coordinate and lead important legislative efforts. SEIU Executive Vice President Dennis Rivera took over Henry's healthcare organizing duties in early 2007.

Henry and Medina helped plan the breakup of SEIU United Healthcare Workers West (UHW-West), a 140,000-member SEIU local, and force half its membership into a new statewide local which SEIU claimed would have enhanced collective bargaining and lobbying power. UHW-West leaders balked at the plan, SEIU established a trusteeship over UHW-West, UHW-West leaders challenged the trusteeship and established an independent union (the National Union of Healthcare Workers, or NUHW), and the two unions began fighting over who would represent more than 100,000 employees in 350 bargaining units. Henry expressed strong anger at the move to create an independent union.

== SEIU presidency ==
On April 13, 2010, several media sources reported that Stern would resign immediately as president of the union. Stern resigned on Thursday, April 15. Anna Burger, SEIU's Secretary-Treasurer and the Chair of the Change to Win Federation, was named SEIU's interim president, to serve for 30 days until the SEIU Executive Board could name a permanent successor. Burger was widely considered to be Stern's likely successor. Henry was considered a dark horse candidate, although likely to challenge Burger for the presidency. Several SEIU insiders urged Dennis Rivera to seek the presidency as well. Stern, however, publicly endorsed Burger for the position.

Support for Henry's candidacy swiftly grew. Within days of Stern's resignation announcement, four Executive Vice Presidents with the international union sent an e-mail announcing their support for her. "Mary Kay's greatest strength is her ability to build consensus and create a highly effective team around shared goals and responsibilities. Mary Kay is the type of leader who motivates rather than demands", the note said. The e-mail also cited the need "to return to organizing as our top priority" and "to restore our relationships with the rest of the union movement and our progressive allies." Twelve days after Stern's announcement, national media reported more local unions representing more than 60 percent of SEIU's 1.9 million members had agreed to support Henry's candidacy. Among the reasons why local union leaders backed Henry were the desire to have a fresh person in the leadership role, Henry was seen as a consensus builder, Burger was seen as too close to the authoritarian Stern, and Henry was viewed as more focused on organizing new members (while Burger was seen as focused on SEIU's political activity).

National press reported that some local and regional SEIU leaders felt Henry would be less likely to continue Stern's local union merger program and more conciliatory to breakaway unions such as those in California. But Burger's backers countered that Henry had never led a local union, had little on-the-ground organizing experience, and had associated with many SEIU staff and elected leaders tainted by recent scandals over financial impropriety. Despite these charges, several large union locals in California and New York backed Henry. Support for Henry also seemed to gain momentum when she told members of the international union's executive board that she favored letting local unions, not leaders based in Washington, D.C., set the union's agenda. In a memo sent to SEIU leaders nationwide, Henry said, "Our local unions and divisions should drive our national priorities, not the other way around." On April 28, Burger withdrew as a candidate for the presidency. Burger said she would not resign as the union's Secretary-Treasurer, and endorsed Henry.

Mary Kay Henry was elected President of SEIU by the international union's executive board on May 8, 2010, to serve the two remaining years of Stern's term. Her original term as president expired in 2012. After her election, Henry said her major priorities as union president would be to advocate for labor rights, immigrants' rights, and LGBT rights. However, she said she did not foresee bringing SEIU back into the AFL-CIO and refused to end the union's battles with its breakaway California locals. A few days after her election, Henry began conducting a review of the duties and assignments of SEIU's top leadership and staff (including Secretary-Treasurer Burger), noting, "It is the prerogative of the president to reassign responsibilities." Burger denied that she was thinking of quitting the union due to the review.

== Awards ==
In 2019 the winners of the Eugene V. Debs Award were the Fight for $15 and Mary Kay Henry on behalf of the SEIU. In 2017 she was inducted into the Michigan Women's Hall of Fame.

== Personal life ==
Henry is a lesbian, and co-founder of SEIU's Lavender Caucus, a gay and lesbian group within the international union dedicated to improving rights for LGBTQ people within unions and at the workplace. She and her partner, Paula Macchello (a senior strategic organizer with the International Brotherhood of Teamsters), are both advocates for same-sex marriage. She has discussed using her leadership position to advocate for LGBT rights.

She serves on the executive board of Families USA, a non-profit consumer health care advocacy organization. Henry used to be a labor adviser to the Catholic Health Care and Work Subcommittee of the United States Conference of Catholic Bishops. Modern Healthcare magazine, an influential trade publication in the U.S. health care industry, named Henry as one of its "Top 25 Women in Healthcare" in 2009.

Trade union offices
Preceded by Andy Stern	President of the Service Employees International Union; 2010–2024	Succeeded by April Verrett
