= Trigger agreement =

The term trigger agreement refers to a tactic utilized by the Service Employees International Union (SEIU) during their Justice for Janitors campaign. If employers agree not to interfere with the SEIU's organizing efforts, then the SEIU promises not to commence bargaining efforts until a majority of the industry market has recognized the employee union. Some argue that this leads to minimal demands, noting that employers are protected from organizing efforts that could result in increased industry competition and are instead, triggered to respond to more moderate demands as an industry.
