= TheWrap =

American entertainment and media news website

- Screenshot of the homepage
- Editor: Sharon Waxman
- Categories: Entertainment; Media news
- Publisher: The Wrap News Inc.
- Founder: Sharon Waxman
- Founded: January 26, 2009; 17 years ago
- First issue: January 26, 2009
- Company: The Wrap News Inc.
- Country: United States
- Based in: West Los Angeles, California, U.S.
- Language: English
- Website: www.thewrap.com

TheWrap is an American online news organization that covers the business of entertainment and media. It was founded by journalist Sharon Waxman in 2009 and is based in Los Angeles. The site features original reporting, analysis, and editorial coverage of the entertainment industry, with particular focus on Hollywood film, television, and streaming media.

== History ==
TheWrap was launched in January 2009 by Sharon Waxman, a former Hollywood correspondent for The New York Times and The Washington Post. The site was created to offer in-depth business coverage of the entertainment industry, including breaking news, analysis, and opinion.

In November 2015, TheWrap expanded its editorial and digital operations with a series of key hires. Tim Molloy rejoined as Deputy Managing Editor, joining Thom Geier in leading editorial operations. Andrew Curry was named Director of Audience Development, overseeing editorial partnerships, social media strategy, and audience engagement. Joan Solsman was hired as Business and Technology Editor, based in New York, to lead coverage of digital media and contribute to TheWrap’s annual Grill conference.

In January 2023, TheWrap announced two new editorial hires to lead its film and television coverage. Kristen Lopez joined as Film Editor, bringing experience from IndieWire and outlets such as Variety, TCM, and RogerEbert.com. Jose Alejandro Bastidas was hired as TV Editor, following his tenure as Assistant Arts and Entertainment Editor at the San Francisco Chronicle. The announcement followed the promotions of Adam Chitwood and Jethro Nededog to Co-Executive Editors.

In February 2025, TheWrap further expanded its leadership with four high-level editorial appointments. Tom Lowry joined as Senior Vice President of Editorial Strategy, responsible for developing business and tech coverage and launching subscription products. Jennifer Laski was appointed Director of Photography and Video after creating the “Visionaries” video series for the site. Graham Starr joined as Business Editor, overseeing business and PRO coverage. Brian Lowry transitioned to Media Editor, focusing on media and politics. Additionally, Drew Taylor and Umberto Gonzalez were promoted to senior roles on the film team.

== Awards and recognition ==
=== National Arts and Entertainment Journalism Awards ===
TheWrap has received multiple honors from the Los Angeles Press Club’s National Arts and Entertainment Journalism Awards:

Year	Category	Recipient(s)	Placement	Description
2016	Feature Photography	—	1st place	Excellence in feature photojournalism.
2016	Blog – Individual	Sharon Waxman (WaxWord blog)	1st place	Commentary and reporting on the WaxWord blog.
2016	Best Entertainment Website	TheWrap	2nd place	Recognized as a leading digital outlet.
2018	Best Entertainment Website (Internet-only)	TheWrap	Winner	Top entertainment website exclusive to the internet.
2019	Best Website	TheWrap	Nominee	Finalist at the 12th annual NAEJ Awards.

=== SoCal Journalism Awards ===
TheWrap has also been honored at the Southern California Journalism Awards:

Year	Category	Recipient(s)	Placement	Description
2009	Best Online News Site	TheWrap	Winner	Awarded by the LAPC for excellence in online journalism.
2012	Best Online News Site	TheWrap	Winner	Second-time recipient of the top digital news site award.
2019	Multiple nominations including Best Website	TheWrap	Nominated	14 nominations at SoCal Journalism Awards.
