= Christina Gonzalez =

American (LA) local TV news reporter

- Born: New York City, New York, U.S.
- Education: University of Miami
- Occupation: News reporter
- Employer: KTTV 1990 - Present
- Awards: Nine Emmy Awards; One Golden Mic Award; One Los Angeles Press Club Journalism Award

Christina Gonzalez is a news reporter for FOX 11 (KTTV) in Los Angeles. She has been with FOX 11 since 1990.

== Biography ==
Gonzalez was born in New York, NY, USA and grew up in Bogotá, Colombia and Miami, Florida. She graduated cum laude from the University of Miami.

Gonzalez began her career in radio producing shows for WNWS in Miami, Florida. From there she hosted popular radio talk shows and anchored news updates for KVVA Radio in Phoenix, Arizona. Her television broadcasting career began in the mid-1980s as a general assignment reporter for KTVW also in Phoenix, Arizona.

In the late 1980s, Gonzalez anchored the 6pm and 11pm newscasts for Univision’s Los Angeles-affiliate, KMEX. As a fill-in anchor, she was regularly seen on the station’s 6:30pm newscast. In 1990, on joining Fox, she became the first journalist from a Spanish-language station to successfully "cross over" to English-language TV news.

In May 1991, Gonzalez spearheaded KTTV’s On Our Toes program. This unique alternative ballet program for at risk teenagers was endorsed by the LA County Probation Department. Acknowledgement for her work with the dancers came from school districts and community agencies. An award for a half-hour special documenting On Our Toes was given by Women in Communications, with a 1993 Clarion Award for best public affairs program, and another Los Angeles area Emmy nomination for arts and culture programming. Her reports on the violence at the US/Mexico border were nominated for additional Emmys in 1991.

In 1994, Gonzalez wrote, produced and anchored another special, California AIDS Ride, about the week long, 850 kilometres fundraising cycling event. Her work received Golden Mike Awards for best documentary, news videography, and videotape editing, and a regional Emmy Award nomination in 1995.

For live reports from the Burlington Apartments fire, Gonzalez received a 1994 Golden Mike Award for Best Spot News Reporting, a local 1994 Emmy nomination, and the LA Press Club’s Above and Beyond Award for her live-saving efforts at the fire scene. The city and county of Los Angeles and the California State Legislature commended her as well.

In 1997, Gonzalez wrote, produced and anchored Through the Eyes of the Children: War in Bosnia, a half-hour news special about children living in the uneasy peace of Sarajevo, in the former Yugoslavia. Through the Eyes of the Children received the Golden Mike Award for best documentary and was a finalist for the Edward R. Murrow Award. In 1999, Gonzalez travelled to refugee camps in southeast Sudan, to work with and document the relief efforts battling a famine and civil war. That coverage earned her two Emmy nominations that year. Later that year she received another Golden Mike Award for her reporting on religious pilgrimages in Cuba]and Haiti.

For her 2000 documentary work, she received two Los Angeles area Emmy awards. “Black and Brown – When Colors Collide“, examined interracial tensions between teenagers. Another half-hour special, “LA Riots… From This Day Forward“, looked at changes since the deadliest urban riots in U.S. history, which Gonzalez herself covered for Fox 11, in 1992.

In 2001, she received three more Emmy nominations for investigative reports on slave labor, health care abuses and features on horse training.

In 2002, Gonzalez’ undercover investigation and reporting on pyramid schemes led to the raid and prosecution of what LAPD officials allege to be the most extensive pyramid fraud in the history of Los Angeles. Light of Gold Pyramid Scheme was honored at the 2002 Los Angeles Press Club Journalism Awards.

As an active community supporter, Gonzalez is a frequent guest speaker, counselor to young people, and mentor for several schools and colleges. Her involvement has garnered recognition from several Southern California organizations and city governments, including the Los Angeles City Council, which cited her for her “extraordinary commitment and numerous contributions to serving the community". The California State Assembly lauded her "effort for deserving women in the 34th Congressional District".

== Los Angeles May Day Mêlée ==
On 1 May 2007 she was involved in the immigration rally mêlée at MacArthur Park. She criticised LAPD constables after they pushed and struck her and several other members of the media during protests. She yelled, "You can't do that! You cannot do that!" in response to the LAPD shoving her and her camerawoman Patricia Lynn Ballaz and telling them to leave the park.

The Los Angeles County District Attorney’s Office found that although the officers tactics may have been questionable there was not enough evidence to seek criminal proceedings against the constables. Gonzalez and several other journalists would file civil lawsuits against both the LAPD and the city. On 4 February 2009 the LA city council voted to settle lawsuits resulting from the incident for $12.85 million.

== Personal life ==
Gonzalez was formerly married to radio talk show host Tom Leykis. After allegedly finding and investigating some hotel receipts, he discovered that she had cheated on him leading to their divorce. Her name was not mentioned on his former radio show, but Leykis stated that, during his time in Arizona, his then-wife cheated on him.

Gonzalez's current husband is a retired Southern California Police Constable. The couple live in Los Angeles.
