= Sharon Janis =

American writer

- Born: 1959 (age 66–67); Detroit, Michigan, U.S.
- Education: University of Michigan
- Occupations: Author, video producer and editor

Sharon Kumuda Janis (born 1959) is an author, video producer and editor.

== Life ==
Sharon Kumuda Janis was born in Detroit in 1959 to atheist psychology teachers, and was interested in psychology and cinematography during her childhood. In 1977 she enrolled at the University of Michigan for a double major in neurophysiology and film/video.

In 1979, she visited a local ashram under the guidance of Swami Muktananda. She joined the ashram's international headquarters as a full-time member and remained there for nearly ten years. She was known by the Sanskrit name of "Kumuda", or night-lotus.

Employing her experience gained in the ashram's video department, she secured a job as video editor in the Hollywood television industry. Her subsequent editing and producing work included Hard Copy, Candid Camera, Disney's Prime Nine News, Mighty Morphin Power Rangers, and X-Men: The Animated Series.

She also founded her own production company in 1998, Night-Lotus Productions, which specializes in spirituality multimedia.

== Awards ==
- Los Angeles Emmy Award: "Best Editor of News Features"
- New York's International Television Festival, Silver Medal: "Best Television Program"
- National Associated Press Board of Directors Award: "Best Television Enterprise"
- Los Angeles Press Club: "First Place Editing"
- Associated Press California/Nevada: "First Place Editor of News Features"
- Golden Mike Award: "First Place Light Feature"

== Bibliography ==
- Never To Return: A Modern Quest for Eternal Truth. Blue Dove Press; 1st edition. 1998. ISBN 1-884997-29-5
- Spirituality for Dummies For Dummies Press, 2000 ISBN 0-7645-5298-8
- Secrets of Spiritual Happiness Night Lotus Books, 2003, ISBN 0-9785568-6-0
