= Sharon Waxman =

American author, journalist, and blogger

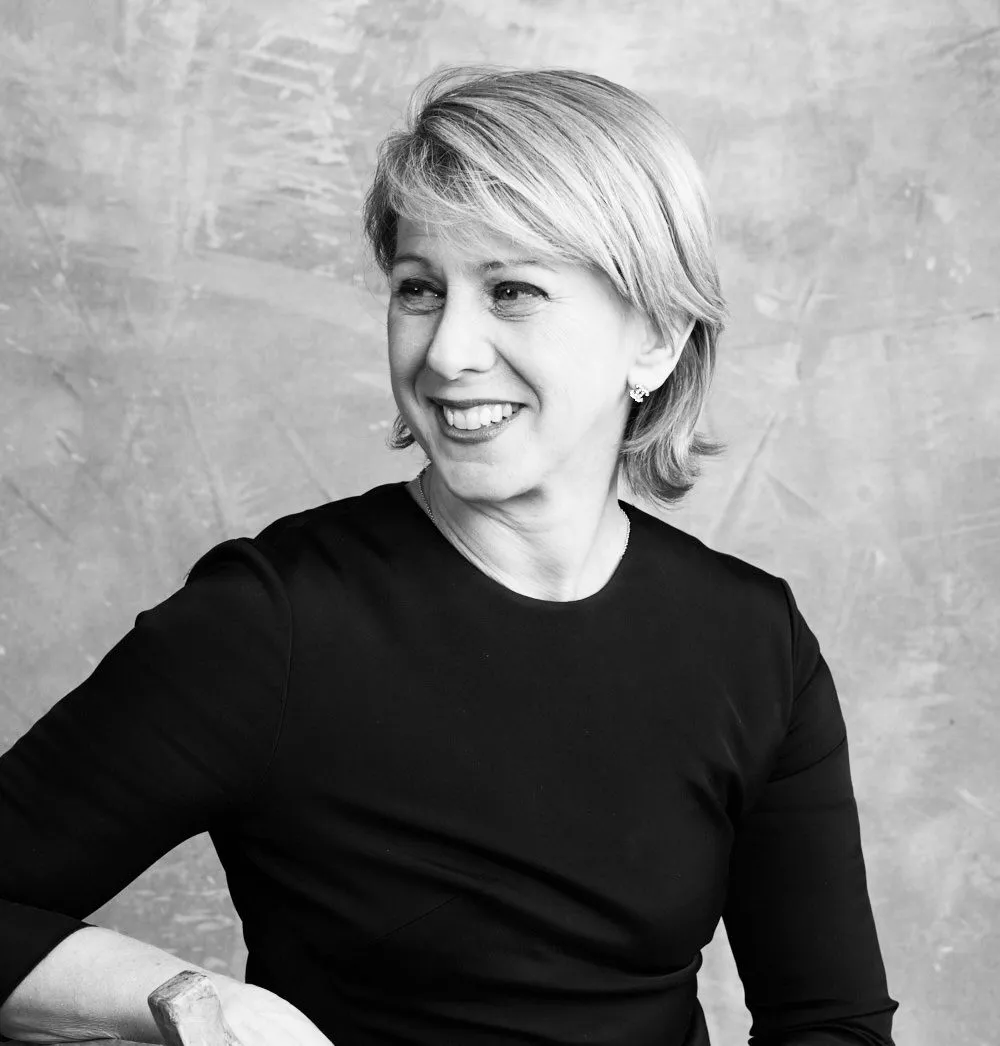
- Born: Circa 1963 (age 62–63); United States
- Education: Barnard College (BA); St Antony's College, Oxford (MPhil)
- Occupations: Journalist, author, blogger
- Years active: 1989-present
- Known for: TheWrap founder

Sharon I. Waxman (born c. 1963) is an American author, journalist, and blogger who has been a correspondent for The Washington Post and The New York Times, and founded the Hollywood and media business news site TheWrap in early 2009.

== Early life and education ==
Waxman grew up in a Modern Orthodox Jewish family in Cleveland, Ohio. She graduated from Barnard College in 1985 with a bachelor of arts in English literature. She then graduated from St. Antony's College, Oxford University, in 1987 with a master of philosophy in modern Middle Eastern studies.

== Career ==
=== Journalism ===
Waxman was a foreign correspondent in Europe and the Middle East from 1989 to 1995. During that time, she worked for Reuters, as a Jerusalem correspondent, and a number of American newspapers.

In 1995, she moved to Los Angeles to cover Hollywood for The Washington Post. In 1998, Waxman won the feature writing award for arts and entertainment from the University of Missouri. In 1999, she was nominated for the Pulitzer Prize by The Washington Post for her work covering the Second Palestinian Intifada. In 2000, she won the Penney Award, the highest prize in feature writing. Between 2001 and 2003, Waxman covered stories in the Middle East for The Washington Post.

In 2012, Waxman was named the best online columnist at the National Entertainment Journalism Awards (NEJA). The following year, she won the Distinguished Journalist in New Media from the Society of Professional Journalists. Most recently, Waxman's WaxWord received an NEJA for Best Entertainment Blog in 2024.

In 2021, Sharon Waxman was named Online Journalist of the Year by the Los Angeles Press Club's SoCal Journalism Awards, with WaxWord named as the best blog that same year. Additionally, “TheWrap-Up” podcast, creator of TheGrill podcast has won several top awards as has the website under her editorial leadership.

=== Authorship ===
In 2005, she published the LA Times best-seller "Rebels on the Backlot: Six Maverick Directors and How They Conquered the Hollywood Studio System." The book profiles six directors, including Quentin Tarantino and David O. Russell. In 2008, Waxman published her second book, "Loot: The Battle Over the Stolen Treasures of the Ancient World," which explores the global trade in antiquities and the battle by source countries to retrieve antiquities held in Western museums.

=== TheWrap ===
Waxman founded the Hollywood and media business news site TheWrap in early 2009. According to CBS Market Watch, Waxman raised $500,000 for TheWrap news, as a news portal site covering entertainment and media, which launched on January 26, 2009. A second round of financing was closed in 2010. By 2013, TheWrap had grown into a site with 30 employees. It also convenes an annual conference attended by leaders in entertainment, media, and technology called TheGrill.

TheWrap has won multiple awards for investigative reporting, columns, criticism and feature writing. In 2021 Waxman was honored as the Best Online Journalist at the Los Angeles Press Club SoCal Journalism Awards, as well for her blog, WaxWord. TheWrap was chosen as the best online news website at the SoCal Journalism Awards in 2018, 2012 and 2009, and best entertainment website at the National Arts & Entertainment Journalism Awards in 2018. In 2019, the site won two National Arts & Entertainment Journalism Awards for the multimedia package “#AfterMeToo: 12 Accusers Share What Happened Next, From Firing to More Trauma.” In 2021, the Los Angeles Press Club’s SoCal Journalism Awards gave the site top prizes for feature photography as well as for its weekly podcast, “TheWrap-Up.”

She is also the creator of WrapWomen, a power base of influential women in media and entertainment, dedicated to promoting women’s leadership. WrapWomen convenes the largest annual event for women and underrepresented groups in entertainment, The Power Women Summit, which in 2021 drew 1 million streams over 3 days in a virtual format.

=== Toxic workplace allegations ===
In October 2021, The Daily Beast published a story about Waxman titled "Hollywood Media Mogul Is 'Degrading' Boss From Hell, Her Staffers Say." Twenty former employees of The Wrap spoke with The Daily Beast, detailing how Waxman's "toxic" actions in the workplace caused high turnover in her newsroom.
