= Stephen Lerner =

American labor and community organizer

Stephen Lerner is an American labor and community organizer. He has organized janitors, farm workers, garment workers, and other low-wage workers into unions.

Lerner is also a contributor on national television and radio programs and has published articles on the 21st-century labor movement.

== Early life ==
Stephen Lerner is the son of a secretary and a psychiatrist and the grandson of Jewish immigrants who fled anti-Semitism and the pogroms of Russia and Poland in the early 20th century. Lerner’s grandfather began his career in America as a waiter in New York and later became a restaurant owner in Miami.

Lerner’s father was able to afford college through his service in the ROTC program and Lerner spent part of his childhood living on a military base in Germany while his father served his country in uniform.

== Career ==
After high school, Lerner became an organizer with the United Farm Workers of America and worked on the grape and lettuce boycotts in New York.

Following his time with the Farm Workers, Lerner worked in the housekeeping departments of Long Island Jewish Medical Center and other healthcare facilities and became an organizer for the healthcare union 1199 in Rhode Island.

Lerner was fired for organizing a union while working as an extrusion machine operator for the jewelry industry. His wife was pregnant with his first child at the time. Following that, Lerner moved to North Carolina to become an organizer for the International Ladies' Garment Workers' Union (ILGWU) and he organized workers throughout the south.

Lerner organized high-tech manufacturing workers and public employees in Ohio with the Communications Workers of America (CWA) before joining the staff of the Service Employees International Union (SEIU) in 1986.

At SEIU, Lerner is credited with creating the Justice for Janitors campaign, a movement by janitors across the country to organize for better wages and working conditions, access to affordable healthcare, and full-time hours and sick time. Justice for Janitors improved the lives of hundreds of thousands of janitors and their families across the country.

Lerner also directed the union’s private equity project, a multi-year campaign to expose the business practices of private equity firms in the lead up to the 2008 economic collapse.

Following the 2008 financial crisis, Lerner became director of the union’s banking and finance project, organizing SEIU members and other community groups across the country into action to challenge the business practices of Wall Street and the big banks. Through this campaign SEIU also partnered with unions and groups in Europe, South America, and elsewhere to build a campaign to hold financial institutions accountable.

He currently serves on the International Executive Board of the 2.2-million-member Service Employees International Union.

Lerner has three sons and lives in Washington, D.C., with his wife, Marilyn.

== Philosophy ==
Lerner is a critic of Wall Street bankers and the increased financialization of the U.S. economy. He argues that the power of investment banks and other financial entities have led to income inequality and served as the driving force behind the creation of overwhelming debt obligations seen at the state and local level. The result, Lerner says, is a consolidation of economic and political power in the hands of a small number of banking and finance executives. Lerner advocates the use of non-violent civil disobedience as a tactic to challenge the influence of Wall Street and corporations.

== Bibliography ==
- Let's Get Moving: Labor's Survival Depends on Organizing Industry-wide for Justice and Power (1991). Labor Research Review: Vol. 1: No. 18, Article 10.
- Reviving Unions (1996). Boston Review.
- Taking the Offensive, Turning the Tide (1998). A New Labor Movement for the New Century. Edited by Gregory Mantsios
- Three Steps to Reorganizing and Rebuilding The Labor Movement: Building New Strength and Unity for all Working Families (2002). Labor Notes.
- Global Unions. A Solution to Labor’s Decline (2006). New Labor Forum.
- Global Corporations, Global Unions (2009 ). The Social Movements Reader: Cases and Concepts, Second Editions. Page 364. Edited by Jeff Goodwin and James M. Jasper.
- An Injury to All: Going Beyond Collective Bargaining as We Have Known It (2010). New Labor Forum.
- Outsourced Economy: Justice for Janitors at the University of Miami (2008). The Gloves-Off Economy: Workplace Standards at the Bottom of America’s Labor Market. With Jill Hurst and Glenn Adler. Annette D. Bernhardt, Labor and Employment Relations Association.
