= Eliseo Medina =

Mexican-American labor union activist

Eliseo Vasquez Medina
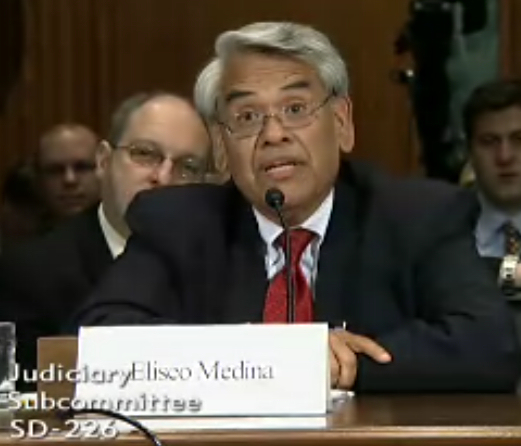
- Eliseo Medina testifying before the U.S. Senate Judiciary Committee, April 30, 2009.
- Born: January 24, 1946 (age 80); Huanusco, Zacatecas, Mexico
- Occupation: Labor leader
- Spouse(s): Dorothy Johnson (1976-1993); Liza Hirsch Du Brul (1995-present)

Eliseo Vasquez Medina (born January 24, 1946) is a Mexican-American labor union activist and leader, and advocate for immigration reform in the United States. From 1973 to 1978, he was a board member of the United Farm Workers.

After leaving the UFW in 1978 he worked for several unions, ultimately becoming an international executive vice president of the Service Employees International Union, the first Mexican American to serve on the union's executive board. He later served as secretary-treasurer of SEIU; he resigned from that position effective October 1, 2013.

== Early life ==
Medina was born in Huanusco, Zacatecas, Mexico, to Eliseo and Guadalupe Medina, both farm workers. In the 1940s and 1950s, his father was employed as a farmworker in the United States, sometimes as an undocumented worker and sometimes as a "bracero" (documented Mexican worker brought to the U.S. temporarily to work in agriculture). His mother's parents had been killed in the Mexican Revolution, and his mother had a strong sense of social justice which she passed to her children.

In 1954, the family moved to Tijuana and Medina's father worked as an undocumented worker in the U.S. for two years. His mother refused to allow the family to enter the United States until their father had obtained legal entry for them. The family settled that year in Delano, California, where his father, mother, and two oldest sisters began working as produce pickers in the fields. Eliseo and the other two youngest children were enrolled in public school. Although he spoke only Spanish when he entered school, he soon excelled not only in English but in his grades as well. He worked as a picker on the weekends and during school vacations to help earn money for his family. He graduated from the eighth grade with honors. After being told that Hispanic students should only take industrial arts classes in high school, Eliseo quit school and became a grape and orange picker permanently.

He broke his leg when he was 19 years old, which left him unemployed for six months. On September 16, 1965, he participated in a meeting called by the National Farm Workers Association (the precursor to the United Farm Workers) to decide whether to join a strike that had been started by a small Filipino union. That meeting launched the Delano grape strike. Although it took almost all the money he had (he literally broke open his piggy bank to pay his membership dues), he joined the union that day. Within weeks, he had become a "strike captain," helping organize the picketers and others who arrived to support the strike each day. In the spring of 1966, as the grape strike continued at various vineyards, Medina sought help in getting a job at one of the companies that had signed a contract with the new union, but was recruited by Dolores Huerta to be a union organizer in the UFW's attempt to form at union at the DiGiorgio Corporation. He met César Chávez as he was leaving the union office. He learned organizing techniques from Fred Ross, a community organizer and founder of the Community Service Organization. He was beaten by Teamsters organizers (who were vying with the UFW for the farmworkers) during the DiGiorgio organizing campaign. His experiences during the DiGiorgio organizing campaign attracted Chavez's notice, and Medina was sent to Chicago to lead the union's boycott of grapes in that city. He continued to rise within the ranks of the organization and became one of its leaders during its years of greatest strength.

== Union career ==
=== UFW ===
Medina began working full-time for the UFW in 1966. He worked in Los Angeles and San Francisco, California, helping to ensure that non-union grapes were not shipped overseas and that wine made from non-union grapes was not sold in stores. He worked closely with Dolores Huerta, and was jailed. In the fall of 1967, César Chávez sent him to Chicago, Illinois, to launch the Midwestern segment of the national boycott that formed the second part of the Delano grape strike. He was so shy that he often could not speak during interviews or press conferences, but he built one of the most successful boycott operations in the country, which ultimately helped force the growers to sign historic contracts in 1970. While in Chicago, he also raised several thousand dollars for the UFW. In January 1968, Medina crossed the nation with a school bus of farmworkers to build support in the Northeast for a secondary boycott of products made from Delano grapes. He concluded that Ross' organizing techniques did not translate well into urban areas and to secondary boycotts, and he began developing his own techniques and ideas about building support among non-farmworkers based on his Chicago experiences. Medina returned to the Midwest, and began holding sit-ins in supermarket chains to publicize the farmworkers' plight, encourage consumers to stop eating table grapes, and pressure stores to stop carrying the produce. Many supermarket chains stopped selling grapes. He won widespread praise for his Midwest campaign.

In 1971, Medina met Dorothy Johnson, a UFW volunteer from Seattle, when she requested an assignment on the Chicago boycott based on Medina's reputation. She followed Medina to California, Florida, Ohio, and back to California again. The couple were married at Medina's mother's house in Delano in 1976.

Medina also achieved a critical victory for UFW in Florida. In 1971, The Coca-Cola Company signed a contract with the union covering its Florida operations, and H.P. Hood and Sons followed soon after for workers at its Florida Citrus brand operations in the state. In 1972, a coalition of agricultural owners and right-to-work advocates successfully encouraged state legislators to introduce a bill that would ban union hiring halls. Since the UFW relied heavily on hiring halls to control who worked in the fields, the ban would have humstrung the union in Florida and made it impossible for it to ensure that only union members received work. Eliseo Medina had already helped the UFW organize striking sugar cane workers in the state by publicizing the slave-labor conditions they worked under and the horrible sanitary situation in the fields (which included a typhoid outbreak). However, César Chávez had ordered him to return to California. The UFW's contracts with grape growers in the Coachella Valley were expiring, but the growers were signing sweetheart contracts with the Teamsters rather than negotiating with the UFW. A strike against the Coachella Valley growers had erupted, and Medina successfully led the farmworkers in opposing the Teamsters and settling the strike. Medina returned to Florida to try to stop the hiring hall bill. Although he had been counseled to merely water it down, Medina sought to stop the bill altogether. Medina, who had little political lobbying experience, implemented a massive letter-writing campaign and had an orange worker who had been forced to work on a slave gang testify before the state legislature. The bill was defeated.

César Chávez was ready to reignite the grape boycott, however, so he ordered Medina to shutter the UFW's Florida operations and had him move to Cleveland, Ohio to begin boycott operations there. Meanwhile, the AFL-CIO had given the UFW a charter as an affiliate of the national labor federation. The charter required the UFW to establish a constitution and hold leadership elections. Medina almost did not make it onto the board. He had agreed to run on Chávez's slate, but when a grassroots group of farmworkers formed their own slate to run against Chávez's hand-picked board, Medina naively agreed to be on the challenger slate as well (believing that workers ran their union). He was dropped from the Chávez slate, but after Manuel Chávez (César's cousin) explained to Medina what his actions meant, Medina rejoined the Chávez slate. On September 23, 1973, Eliseo Medina was elected for the first time to the UFW Board of Directors.

In early 1978, Medina was appointed the UFW's organizing director. In his first three months in office, the union won 13 elections and added more than 3,000 new members. He also changed the way the UFW approached strikes. In the past, the union would strike but end the walkout once the union had won the organizing election (held under the procedures of the California Agricultural Labor Relations Act). Employers would then file numerous appeals to the election, and over the many months (and sometimes years) it took for the appeals to be heard the union's support would vanish. Medina's new strategy was to keep the workers on strike even after the organizing election was won; this pressured employers to waive their legal right to appeal, recognize the union, and enter collective bargaining negotiations immediately. If negotiations stalled, Medina's back-up strategy was ask union members to perform their jobs sloppily and then leave work. The employer would institute a lockout, a strike would begin, and the employer would return to the bargaining table to get the harvest in.

Eliseo Medina was considered by many to be a successor to César Chávez. In 1977, Medina was elected Second Vice President of the UFW (replacing Philip Vera Cruz), which added credence to these assumptions. He was also probably the only member of the UFW who could have successfully challenged Chávez for the presidency of the union. UFW co-founded Dolores Huerta said, "He would have been president if he'd stayed." But Medina did not stay. For the past several years, Medina had been having serious disagreements with Chávez about the low level of worker input into the union's direction. Additionally, Medina felt Chávez was trying to turn the union into a poor people's social movement, a policy change Medina also disagreed with. "We were so close, and then it began to fall apart... At the time we were having our greatest success, Cesar got sidetracked. Cesar was more interested in leading a social movement than a union per se," he later said. Medina was also frustrated by Chávez's insistence that all UFW staff be unpaid volunteers, a policy not conducive to building a professional, long-lasting union. At a UFW executive board meeting shortly before he resigned, Chávez publicly criticized Medina for proposing that the union hire full-time organizers. Medina later said:

At a time when we should have been focused on consolidating and building the union, we got involved in a lot of things that drew attention from what I felt was our priority mission. ... My interest was building a farmworkers union. The goal was not building a farmworkers movement per se. It created a lot of tension.

Medina resigned his union position in August 1978. The final straw appears to have been Chávez's dismantling of the union legal department. Medina wasn't alone in leaving, however. Between 1978 and 1981, many of the UFW's top leaders and staff left the union or were forced out, including Secretary-Treasurer and UFW co-founder Gilbert Padilla, UFW chief organizer Marshall Ganz, legal department director Jerry Cohen and most of his staff, and union health services program director Jessica Govea.

=== SEIU ===
After leaving the UFW, Eliseo Medina worked for the American Federation of State, County and Municipal Employees for two years, helping organize workers in the University of California. He later organized public employees in Texas for the union.

In 1986, Eliseo Medina was appointed executive director of SEIU Local 2028, a public employee union based in San Diego, California. Medina turned around the "failing" local: Membership soared from 1,700 to 10,000, and then Local 2028 absorbed a far larger independent union which had been SEIU's rival for decades.

Medina and his first wife divorced in 1993. In 1995, he married widower and former UFW organizer Liza Hirsch Du Brul.

In 1996, Medina ran against token opposition for the position of international vice president on the SEIU executive board. He won, becoming the first Mexican American elected to an international office at SEIU. Medina was an active vice president, overseeing many successful union organizing campaigns in the right-to-work Southwest and Deep South. He was a critical supporter of the Active Citizenship Campaign, an effort in the mid-1990s led by Miguel Contreras and others to boost Latino voting in Los Angeles County (and which led to the election of Antonio Villaraigosa as Mayor of Los Angeles in 2005). He played a critical role in SEIU's successful strike and organizing campaign at the University of Miami in 2001, engaging in a hunger strike in support of the janitors being organized there.

In 2005, he brought the Latino voter project Mi Familia Vota to Arizona, where he and others led a successful effort to enact by referendum an increase in the state minimum wage. He led SEIU's successful campaign to convince the AFL-CIO to abandon its long-standing policy of opposition to illegal immigration and to support legalization of undocumented workers. Since the late 1990s, his views on immigration have been largely been adopted by the American labor movement, and he was the Change to Win Federation's chief lobbyist on immigrant rights in 2006.

Medina was the guiding force behind SEIU's Justice for Janitors in the 1990s and 2000s, and pushed the union to organize home healthcare workers by seeking legislative changes that would make the government the "employer of record" for these employees (allowing them to be easily organized by the tens of thousands). In 2000, he oversaw a Justice for Janitors organizing effort tied to collective bargaining negotiations that led to the largest wage increases in the history of the program, and in 2001 helped negotiate an employer neutrality and card check agreement between SEIU and the large Catholic Healthcare West hospital chain which led to thousands of new healthcare workers joining the union. As of 2006, he oversaw the activities of SEIU locals in 17 Southwestern and West Coast states. In 2010, he was unanimously elected international secretary-treasurer of the SEIU, completing the unfinished term of Anna Burger. In 2012, he was re-elected to the position.

Medina also played a role in some of SEIU's internal controversies, including the International Union's imposition in 2009 of a trusteeship on SEIU's largest California local, SEIU-UHW, which represented healthcare workers throughout the state. A number of UHW officials and members of UHW split from SEIU to form an independent union, the National Union of Healthcare Workers. Medina also tacitly supported Andy Stern's unsuccessful effort in 2009 to take over UNITE HERE, with whom Medina had worked to change the AFL-CIO’s immigration policy in 2000.

As of 2010, Medina was an honorary co-chair of the Democratic Socialists of America, and served as such until the position was abolished in 2017.

== Retirement and immigration reform ==
Medina announced on September 3 that he would resign as an executive vice president and secretary-treasurer of SEIU effective October 1, 2013. He said he wished to concentrate more of his time on winning passage of immigration reform. In November and December 2013, Medina undertook a 22-day hunger strike, at the age of 67, to draw attention to the need for action on immigration reform. During his fast, Medina was visited by President Obama in a tent near the Capitol in Washington DC.

== Bibliography ==
- Aubry, Erin. "Conversation With Labor Ground-Breaker Eliseo Medina." Los Angeles Times. May 4, 1996.
- Ferriss, Susan; Sandoval, Ricardo; and Hembree, Diana. The Fight in the Fields: Cesar Chavez and the Farmworkers Movement. New York: Harcourt Brace, 1997.
- Ganz, Marshall. Why David Sometimes Wins: Leadership, Organization, and Strategy in the California Farm Worker Movement. New York: Oxford University Press, 2009.
- Hammerback, John C. and Jensen, Richard Jay. The Rhetorical Career of Cesar Chavez. College Station, Tex.: Texas A&M University Press, 1998.
- Levy, Jacques. Cesar Chavez: Autobiography of La Causa. Minneapolis: University of Minnesota Press, 2007.
- Medina, Eliseo. "Eliseo Medina." In Hope Dies Last: Keeping the Faith in Difficult Times. Studs Terkel, ed. New York: New Press, 2003.
- Medina, Lara. Las Hermanas: Chicana/Latina Religious-Political Activism in the U.S. Catholic Church. Philadelphia: Temple University Press, 2004.
- Mooney, Patrick H. and Majka, Theo J. Farmers' and Farm Workers' Movements: Social Protest in American Agriculture. New York: Twayne, 1995.
- Mukasey, Michael Bernard. How Obama Has Mishandled the War on Terror. New York: Encounter Books, 2010.
- Pawel, Miriam. "Decisions of Long Ago Shape the Union Today." Los Angeles Times. January 10, 2006.
- Pawel, Miriam. "Former Chavez Ally Took His Own Path." Los Angeles Times. January 11, 2006.
- Pawel, Miriam. The Union of Their Dreams: Power, Hope, and Struggle in Cesar Chavez's Farm Worker Movement. New York: Bloomsbury Publishing, 2010.
- Shaw, Randy. Beyond the Fields: Cesar Chavez, the UFW, and the Struggle for Justice in the 21st Century. Berkeley, Calif.: University of California Press, 2008.
- Who's Who in Labor. New York: Arno Press, 1976.

Trade union offices
Preceded by Anna Burger	Secretary-Treasurer of the Service Employees International Union; 2010–2013	Succeeded by Mike Fishman
