= Robert Kovacik =

American journalist

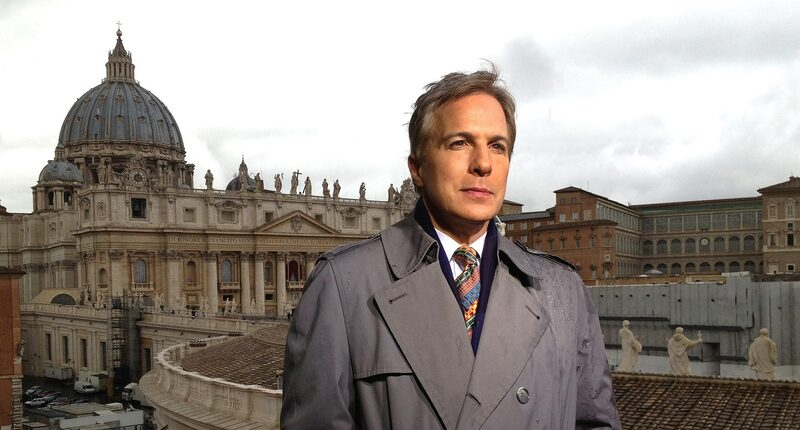
- Born: Cleveland, Ohio, U.S.
- Education: University School (Hunting Valley, Ohio; Brown University; Columbia University (Graduate School of Journalism)
- Occupations: Television news anchor and reporter
- Website: www.nbclosangeles.com/on-air/about-us/Robert_Kovacik.html

Robert Kovacik is an American television journalist based in Los Angeles, California. He is an anchor/reporter for NBC (KNBC) Los Angeles. In 2018, Kovacik won the Emmy for Outstanding Hard News Reporting. He was selected as Journalist of the Year at the 55th Southern California Journalism Awards in 2013.

Kovacik is known for bringing viewers a local perspective and in-depth coverage of national and international events, including the funeral of Queen Elizabeth II, the royal wedding between Prince Harry and Meghan Markle, the Manchester Arena bombing in Manchester, England, during an Ariana Grande concert, the extensive manhunt in Maine for the mass killer in the 2023 Lewiston shootings, the Route 91 Harvest Festival massacre in Las Vegas, the Pulse (nightclub) shooting in Orlando, and the Summer Olympics in London. Kovacik earned Emmy Awards for his coverage of the Olympics, as well as the Papal Conclave in Italy and the mass shooting in Orlando.

Kovacik was elected by his industry peers to serve three consecutive terms as President of the Los Angeles Press Club.

Kovacik is a three-time recipient of the Genesis Awards, presented by the Humane Society of the United States, recognizing the best media coverage of animal protection issues. He has also served as Master of Ceremonies for the Los Angeles Fire Department's annual Valor Awards every year since 2015.

=== Response to 2026 Chatsworth helicopter crash ===
On September 15, 2026, while live at the scene covering a fatal bus crash in Chatsworth, Kovacik was told that a KNBC helicopter had crashed nearby, killing two of his colleagues aboard: journalist Eliana Moreno and pilot George Marciniw. Edy Gutierrez Mejia, a tourist from Guatemala, was killed on the ground.

== Education ==
Robert Kovacik holds an honors undergraduate Bachelor of Arts degree from Brown University in Providence, Rhode Island. Kovacik also has an honors Master's degree from the Columbia University Graduate School of Journalism. After graduating from Columbia, he spent over 5 years in New York City before moving to California.

== Career ==
Kovacik began his career at 23 years of age when he became the youngest anchor in New York City for NIGHTWORLD at Public Broadcasting Service (PBS) primary member station, WNET. In 1994, he relocated to Los Angeles to become an anchor and reporter for KCOP-TV.

Kovacik left KCOP in 2001, and was named the West Coast correspondent, anchor, and bureau chief for the newly formed National Geographic Channel and its nightly news show, National Geographic Today.

Kovacik joined KNBC-TV in 2004. In 2006, a murder suspect chose to surrender to him live on-air., for which Kovacik received a Golden Mike Award and an Edward R. Murrow Award. In 2007 he was on location and struck by a police squad car carrying Paris Hilton. In 2008 he again made international headlines after an angry confrontation between then Los Angeles Police Department Police Chief William Bratton and LA City Councilman Dennis Zine while Kovacik was reporting for Today in LA.

His exclusive examination into the Los Angeles Fire Department's 911 response times prompted the Mayor to call for an audit of the LAFD. His reporting on the investigation surrounding President Clinton's impeachment was included in the Kenneth Starr Report (Starr Report), and his groundbreaking expose into overcrowded LA animal shelters helped force the city to change its laws.

== Awards and honors ==
- 1995: First Place in 'Best of the West' Competition for 'Outstanding Local Television News Series, Growth and Urban Development Reporting"
- 1997: Nomination for Emmy Award for 'Serious News Story'
- 1997: Multi-Part Genesis Award for 'Best Series Serious News Story'
- 1998: Nomination for Emmy Award for 'Live Sports Coverage'
- 1999: Nomination for Emmy Award for 'Informational/Public Affairs Series'
- 1999: Nomination for Emmy Award for 'Serious News Story – Single Report'
- 2006: Edward R. Murrow Award, Spot News Coverage, “Murder Suspect Surrenders”
- 2007: Nomination for Emmy Award for 'Murder Suspect Surrenders'
- 2008: Golden Mike Award, "Paparazzi Task Force"
- 2008: Nomination for Emmy Award, 'Light News Story – Single Report'
- 2009: 2nd Place, LA Press Club National Entertainment Journalism Award
- 2009: APTRA 'Chris Harris Reporter of the Year' award
- 2010: Golden Mike Award for 'Best Documentary', "LA Heroes: Untold Stories of Haiti"
- 2011: APTRA, "Best Documentary"
- 2013: Emmy Award, Sports Series, "The Summer Olympics: SoCal Shines at the Summer Games"
- 2013: nomination for Emmy Award, Serious News Story, "LAFD Response Times"
- 2013: Nomination for Emmy Awards, Light News Story, "Cash for your Crib"
- 2013: LA Press Club, "Television Journalist of the Year", Robert Kovacik
- 2013: LA Press Club, "Investigative Television Reporting", "LAFD Response Times: How Long Will You Wait."
- 2014: Emmy Award, Light News Story-Multi-Part Report, "The Papal Conclave: SoCal at the Vatican"
- 2014: Nomination for Emmy Award, "Outstanding News Feature Reporting"
- 2015: Emmy Award nomination, Outstanding Hard News Reporting
- 2015: Golden Mike Award, Best Light Feature Reporting, "Night Crawlers"
- 2016: Golden Mike Award, Best Business and Consumer Reporting, "Stolen Gas",
- 2017: Emmy Nomination for "Light News Story (Single Report): ("Dive Warriors")"
- 2019: Genesis Award (Above and Beyond Award) - Reporter, "Life Connected—Canine on Call"
- 2019: Golden Mike Award - Reporter, Best Continuing Coverage, “Borderline Shooting.”
- 2020: Golden Mike Award—Reporter, Best Continuing Coverage, "Kobe Bryant's Death"
- 2020: Golden Mike Award - A, Best 30 Minute Newscast, 11pm
- 2021: Emmy Award Nomination, Live Coverage of an Unscheduled Event, "Tiger Woods Crash"
- 2021: Southern California Journalism Award, Reporter, Public Service News, "The LAPD: Joining the Force"
- 2021: Golden Mike Award—Reporter, Best TV Sports Reporting, "An Olympic Hopeful at 60"
- 2021: Golden Mike Award Nomination, Reporter, Best Live Coverage of a News Story, "Tiger Woods Crash"
- 2022: Golden Mike Award, Best Television “Live” Coverage of a News Story, "Live Slaughterhouse Escape"
- 2023: Golden Mike Award - A, Best 30 Minute Newscast, 11pm
- 2025 Golden Mike Award, Best Individual Writing, “Altadena is My Life”
- 2025 Golden Mike Award, Best Serious Feature Reporting, “Altadena is My Life”
- 2025 Golden Mike Award, Best Continuing Coverage, Menendez Brother’s Resentencing Hearing
- 2025 Golden Mike Award, Best Digital Breaking News Reporting, “Menendez Special: The Case”
- 2025 Golden Mike Award, Reporter, Best 30 Minute Newscast, NBC4 News at 6pm
- 2025 Golden Mike Award, Reporter, Best 60 Minute Newscast, NBC4 News at 5pm
- 2025 Golden Mike Award Nomination, Best Entertainment Reporting, “Debbie Allen: Dancing in the Light”
- 2025: Golden Mike Award Nomination, Best Medical and Science Reporting, “Why Did a Teen Fall off Mt. Whitney?”
- 2026 Emmy Award, News Series, “ Black Heritage: Altadena Roots and Resilience”
- 2026 Emmy Award Nomination, Live Coverage of an Unscheduled News Event, “Southern California's Fire Disaster”
