= Laurie Fernandez =

American journalist

- Born: New York City, U.S.
- Occupations: Television News Videographer and Editor
- Title: KCBS 2 and KCAL 9 News Videographer and Editor

Laurie Fernandez is an American television news videographer and editor based in Los Angeles, California. She is a news videographer, editor and live truck engineer for television stations, KCBS 2 and KCAL 9 in Los Angeles.

== Early life and education ==
Laurie Fernandez was born in New York City, New York and grew up in San Juan, Puerto Rico. Fernandez holds a Bachelor of Arts degree in Mass Communications and Photography from the University of Wisconsin–La Crosse.

== Career ==
Fernandez began her television career at station WKBT in La Crosse, Wisconsin, where she was also the first female master control engineer.

Shortly after, Fernandez moved to Los Angeles, California, to work at Telemundo's Spanish station KVEA 52, where her bilingual skills were put to good use. She was then hired at KCAL 9 in Los Angeles and later at CBS 2 when both stations merged, after CBS acquired KCAL 9 in 2002.

Fernandez started her career as a news videographer when the field was traditionally male-dominated. Because of her gender, she encountered obstacles and preconceptions. Colleagues were often surprised to see a woman working as a cameraman. She overcame these obstacles as she gained experience. Women remain a minority among news videographers, though their numbers have grown as the equipment has become lighter.

Fernandez has covered some of the major news stories in the Los Angeles area. The Rodney King Trial, The Los Angeles Riots, The Malibu Fires, The Northdridge earthquake, The O.J Simpson Trial, The North Hollywood Bank Shooting, and The Anaheim Police Shooting.

== Career highlights ==
=== Anaheim Police shooting ===
Laurie Fernandez's news video made world headlines when on July 21, 2012, while covering an officer-involved shooting in the city of Anaheim, California, a chaotic scene ensued. Anaheim police started shooting rubber bullets, pepper pellets, and a police k-9 dog was unleashed at a small crowd of people that included women, children and babies. Residents had gathered near the scene of the fatal shooting of 25 - year old Manuel Diaz, who was unarmed. Witnesses say that he was shot in the back, fell to his knees, and was then shot in the back of the head by Anaheim police officers.

As angry residents took to the streets demanding answers from the police, they were met with pepper pellets and rubber bullets. CBS 2/KCAL 9 news videographer, Laurie Fernandez, was the only videographer to capture the chaotic scene. This video is one of the more unsettling pieces of news video ever seen on television and on the internet.

As the video aired and was replayed on the internet, it caused controversy in Anaheim and across the U.S. People compared the violence of this incident to the Rodney King story and the images of the Civil Rights Movement, where police dogs were let loose on demonstrators.

The Anaheim Police Department received angry calls from people around the country and the world, and protestors showed up at the police station the following day. Daily demonstrations took place after this story aired, and on July 24, 2012, there was a riot with people demanding an investigation and justice. In their opinion, residents and those who watched the video, saw police using excessive force.

The reaction to this story continues and has brought the Anaheim Police Department and the city under intense scrutiny. This story set in motion the following developments:

An investigation by the Orange County District Attorney's Office, the California Attorney General, the U.S. Attorney's Office, and the FBI, of the shooting and melee that followed, captured by Fernandez.

A $50 million civil rights lawsuit filed by the family of Manuel Diaz against the Anaheim Police Department.

A number of lawsuits filed by the people who were hurt by the Anaheim Police Department right after the officer- involved shooting.

=== Child abduction ===
In 2002, while covering a child abduction story, her video made national news again, when she captured the suspect's arrest. The child, Jessica Cortez, had been missing for weeks after being abducted from a park in Los Angeles. The child was safely returned to her parents.

=== Janitors Protest ===
In 1990 Fernandez shot video of a janitors protest in Los Angeles. When the protesters clashed with Los Angeles police officers, they were hit with police batons. A pregnant woman lost her baby, and many protesters were injured. The janitors had a Los Angeles city permit for the demonstration. Protesters who were injured used the news video, that aired during the news broadcast, to win their lawsuit against the city of Los Angeles.

== Awards and honors ==
- 2013 Clarion Award, Spot News Story, "Anaheim Police Shooting"
- 2013 Mark Twain Award, Best Spot News Story, "Chaos In Anaheim After Officer Involved Shooting"
- 2013 Mark Twain Award, Best Editing, "Chaos In Anaheim After Officer Involved Shooting"
- 2013 Mark Twain Award, Best Videography, "Chaos In Anaheim After Officer Involved Shooting"
- 2013 Telly Award, Videography, "Anaheim Police Shooting"
- 2012 Southern California Journalism Award, Best News Story, "Anaheim Police Shooting"
- 2012 Golden Mike Award, Best TV Spot News Story, "Anaheim Police Shooting"
- 2012 Golden Mike Award, Best TV Video Editing, "Anaheim Police Shooting"
- 2012 Golden Mike Award, Best TV News Videography, "Anaheim Police Shooting"
- 2007 Emmy Award, Live Special Events - News, "Fireworks On The Fourth!"
- 1997 Emmy Award, Live Coverage Of An Unscheduled News Event, "North Hollywood Bank Shooting"
- 1996 Clarion Award, Television News Magazine Program, "KCAL 9 News Journal"
- 1996 The New York Festivals World Medal, International TV Programming, "KCAL 9 News Journal"
- 1995 California/Nevada Associated Press Award, Best Live Coverage, "January Floods"
- 1995 Emmy Award, Live Coverage Of An Unscheduled News Event, "January Floods"
- 1993 California/Nevada Associated Press Award, Best Series, "Doin' Time
- 1990 Emmy Award Nomination, Camera, "Janitors Protest"
