= April Verrett =

American labor leader

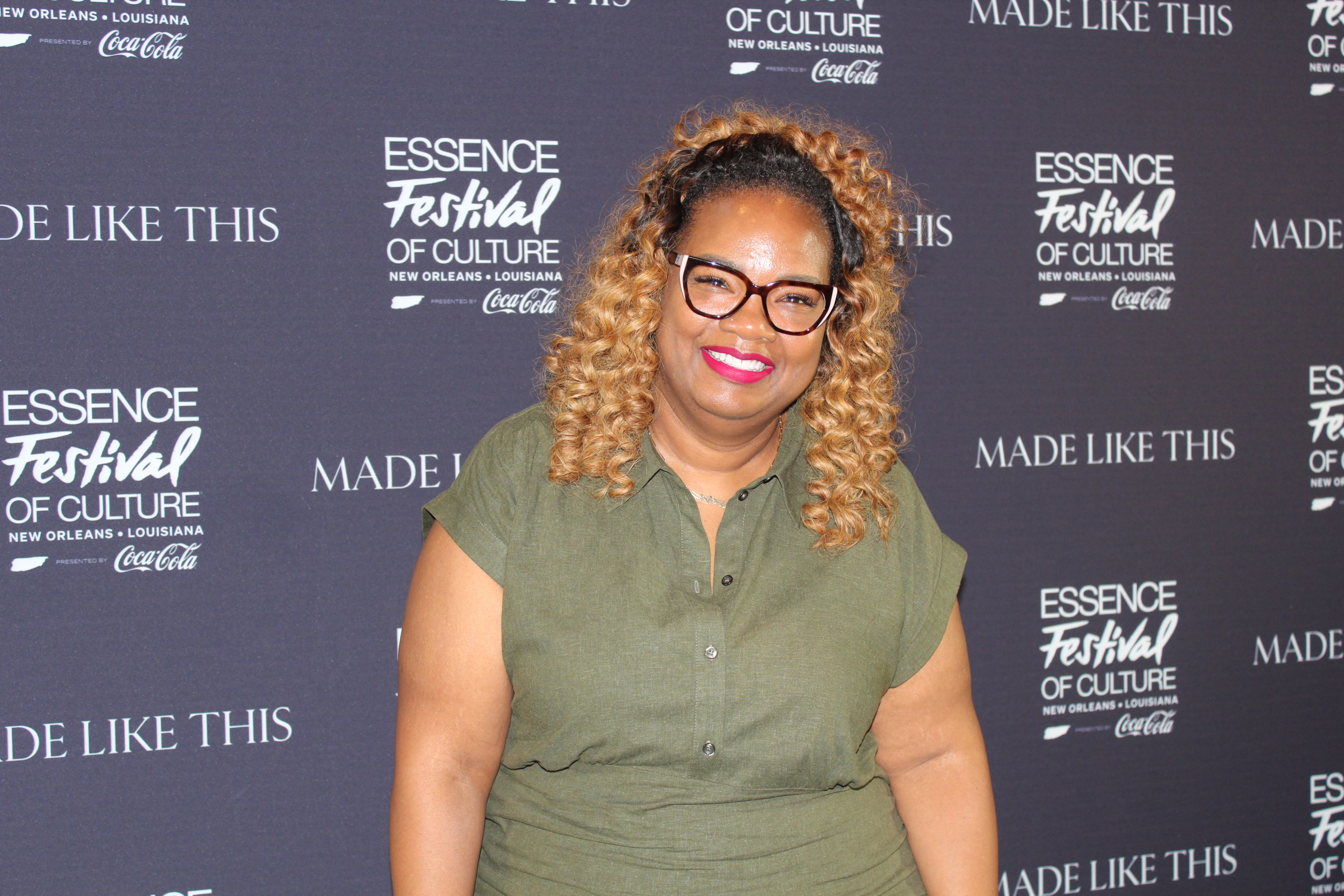
- Known for: President of the Service Employees International Union (2024-Present)

April Verrett is an American labor union activist who has served as president of the Service Employees International Union (SEIU) since 2024. She is the first Black person to serve in the role.

== Biography ==
=== Early life ===
Verrett was born on the South side of Chicago. Verrett has a sister and was raised by her grandmother who served as a Union Steward for SEIU Local 46.

=== Union career ===
Her grandmother's involvement a Union Steward for SEIU Local 46 has been mentioned as playing a role in inspiring her work as a labor organizer.

Her organizing career has a focus on healthcare workers across the nation which began with leading SEIU Healthcare Illinois-Indiana-Missouri-Kansas's (HCII) 92,000 members as Executive Vice President where she advocated for corporate tax responsibility and broader worker protections. She then led SEIU Local 2015 from 2019 through 2022, California's largest local union and the largest long term care union in the US representing over 400,000 care providers. From 2022-2024 Verrett was the International Secretary Treasurer of SEIU taking on strategic planning and development.

Her career also includes chairing the National Home Care Council, sitting as co-chair for the National Organizing Committee, and serving on SEIU's Finance Committee. Verrett is also active in the Democratic Party, and in 2021 was appointed as its state controller in California.

Under her leadership, SEIU affiliated with the AFL-CIO, and Verrett became a vice-president of the federation. She was elected president of SEIU's International Union in 2024. She is the first Black person to serve in the role.

== Honors ==
Verrett was included on Modern Healthcare's Top 100 Most Influential People in Healthcare 2024 list.

== Personal life ==
Verrett's mother died two weeks after her birth at the age of 28. Her father at age 32 committed suicide when she was six. Verrett is Catholic.

Trade union offices
Preceded by Laphonza Butler	President of SEIU Local 2015; 2019–2022	Succeeded by Arnulfo De La Cruz
Preceded by Gerry Hudson	Secretary-Treasurer of the Service Employees International Union; 2022–2024	Succeeded by Rocío Sáenz
Preceded by Mary Kay Henry	President of the Service Employees International Union; 2024–present	Succeeded by Incumbent
