= Maria Hall-Brown =

American television producer and journalist

Maria Hall-Brown is an American journalist, television producer, and actor.

== Journalism ==
She is the host and producer of Bookmark with Maria Hall-Brown, a news magazine featuring interviews with book authors, and a producer and occasional correspondent on KOCE's Real Orange newscast. Hall-Brown was a producer for Calworks: Steps Towards Success, which was nominated for a Los Angeles Area Emmy Award in 2003. She was awarded a Golden Mike Award by the Radio and Television News Association of Southern California in 2007.

== Acting ==
Maria Hall-Brown starred alongside David Carradine in 1988's Open Fire and 1998's Light Speed.

== Education and background ==
Hall-Brown earned a BFA in Drama from UC Irvine in 1984. Her birthday is January 23.
