= Rick Reiff =

American journalist

Richard "Rick" Reiff (b. May 30, 1952 in Chicago) is a Pulitzer Prize-winning journalist based in Orange County, California.

He is co-host of Studio SoCal, a weekly public affairs program on PBS SoCal KOCE-TV, the PBS flagship in the Los Angeles media market. He previously produced and hosted the station's SoCaL Insider with Rick Reiff and Inside OC with Rick Reiff for ten seasons. He is an editor-at-large and former editor of the Orange County Business Journal, a California business weekly. For that publication, he authored its OC Insider column for 15 years.

== Early life and education ==
Reiff was born on Chicago's North Side to parents of German and Italian ethnicity. He graduated from the city's Lane Tech High School in 1970. He earned a bachelor's degree from the Medill School of Journalism at Northwestern University in 1974.

== Career ==
He spent a year at the Norwalk (Ohio) Reflector before joining the Akron Beacon Journal in 1975. In 1986 he was the lead reporter for the paper's coverage of the battle between Goodyear Tire and corporate raider James "Jimmy" Goldsmith, which received the 1987 Pulitzer Prize for General News Reporting.

Reiff joined American City Business Journals later in 1987, where he served as managing editor of Business First in Columbus, Ohiol; and editor of the Westchester (N.Y.) Business Journal. In 1988 he joined the staff of Forbes magazine. In 1990 he became editor of the Orange County Business Journal.

== Awards ==
In 2001 Reiff received a Golden Mike Award for Best Original News Commentary from the Radio and TV News Association of Southern California. Inside OC won the Golden Mike for Best News Public Affairs Program in Southern California, Division B, in 2011 and its successor SoCal Insider won the same award in 2012 and 2013.
