= SEIU Member Activists for Reform Today =

SEIU Member Activists for Reform Today (SMART) is a national organization of rank-and-file union members working for the democratic reform of the Service Employees International Union (SEIU). SEIU primarily represents workers in the public sector, healthcare industry, and property services. Today it is America's largest and fastest growing union with 2 million members, many of whom are minorities, immigrants, and women.

According to SMART's website, the organization opposes consolidation of power in the hands of international union leaders, forced mergers of locals, and agreements made with employers without membership involvement. Like other internal union reform movements including Teamsters for a Democratic Union (TDU), SMART seeks a union which represents and voices the concerns of rank-and-file members rather than the interests of international union leaders. This goal of union democracy includes meaningful membership participation in union activities ranging from local and national union elections to bargaining sessions with employers. Union democracy is also guaranteed by protections for membership dissent and organized internal opposition.

SMART argues that the increased power of SEIU's international leadership vis-à-vis local union members has limited this type of member access and activism that is essential for union democracy to thrive. Recently, constitutional changes have empowered SEIU's president and executive board to form bargaining units and negotiate contracts without local member participation. The threat of retaliatory forced mergers or trusteeship has also silenced dissent in many locals. While SMART recognizes that SEIU—like all American unions—operates in a legal and social context that is generally hostile, the organization argues that efforts to expand the union's power and membership should not compromise union democracy. As SMART puts it, "growth is critical to our success, and to rebuilding a fighting labor movement – but not growth at all costs, and not without full participation of the members."

== Mergers of SEIU locals ==
SMART members question the recent policy of merging smaller union locals into single locals with up to and over 100,000 members. Large memberships give locals power-in-numbers in contract negotiations and may eliminate the inefficiency of multiple small locals representing workers in the same industry. Nevertheless, union reformers contend that mega-locals can lead to "out-of-touch leadership" that—in the context of a larger bureaucracy—becomes "unresponsive" to members' concerns.

Union reformers have also criticized the nature of some SEIU mergers. They contend that some locals were merged without members' consent through a top-down, undemocratic process. While hearings and membership votes are held to approve mergers, SEIU's limited publicity of merger plans often results in low voter turnout. Mergers can also be implemented to limit local autonomy and dissent by absorbing dissident locals into larger ones where their voice can be drowned out. For example, SMART members contend that current plans to restructure how SEIU represents its hospital and long term care workers in California is a thinly veiled attempt to quell dissent from dissident Oakland-based local, United Healthcare West (UHW).

== Employer agreements ==
SEIU's policy of developing partnerships with its employers is a major point of contention for the internal reform movement. Unions often seek neutrality agreements with employers to preempt union busting efforts and to facilitate the card check process of winning union recognition. SEIU has significantly expanded these neutrality agreements to include concessions on the ability to strike and publicly criticize companies. Some deals have traded organizing rights in one location—often determined by the employer—for contract concessions to management in other bargaining units or for guarantees to delay organizing at other sites. To date, SEIU has made agreements with several US-based and multinational companies including, Kaiser Permanente, Tenet Healthcare, Sodexho, and the US unit of Compass Group PLC based in London.

SMART and other critics have argued that by prohibiting strikes and public relations tactics these deals often take away the union's key tools for winning wage and benefit gains at the bargaining table. Without picket lines or the use of a public corporate campaign—which enlists community, religious, and political allies in an effort to pressure employers to recognize unions or make contract concessions—methods for worker and community mobilization are often limited.

In some cases, SEIU has participated in legislative lobbying efforts with or on behalf of companies as part of corporate partnerships. In Washington state, SEIU Local 775 joined Eagle Healthcare and five other nursing home companies to form "Washington United for Quality Nursing Home Care" to lobby for increased state funding for private nursing homes. These lobbying efforts could secure funds needed to help pay Local 775 members working in nursing homes. However, the 10-year agreement outlining this labor-management alliance empowers nursing home chains to unilaterally designate select homes for organizing drives (and keep others non-union) and bars strikes as well as "negative rhetoric" against management. Additionally, a portion of any state funds the alliance receives is designated for business and property tax reimbursements for the nursing home companies—corporate tax breaks which will not be shared with Local 775 members.

In 2003, forming a similar alliance with nursing homes in California, SEIU expanded its joint lobbying efforts into the arena of tort and health care reform. According to a copy of the confidential agreement establishing the "California Alliance" leaked to SF Weekly, SEIU planned to lobby on behalf of nursing home companies for increased state subsidies and limits on patient neglect or malpractice lawsuits. SEIU also promised to oppose any new safe staffing regulations or legislation. As in Washington state, the California agreement enabled SEIU locals including UHW and the United Long-Term Care Workers, Local 6434 to organize unopposed in specific nursing homes. In return, union members gave up their right to strike. "Template agreements" establishing guidelines for wages, benefits, and working conditions also preempted substantive contract negotiations. According to a subsequent 2007 assessment of the "California Alliance" written by UHW, " workers…found themselves with 'template' contracts that allowed for very little power on the shop floor with no right to strike and no clear path toward full collective bargaining rights." (Upon expiration of the "California Alliance" in 2007, SEIU opted not to renew the labor-management deal.)

Supporters of employer agreements argue that they are a necessary organizing innovation in the face of decreasing rates of unionization in the past few decades. During labor's hey-day during and after WWII, there was a tacit agreement of capital to participate in a formalized relationship with labor during contract negotiations. This "labor-capital accord" was facilitated by a unique context: powerful industrial unions in the economy's large manufacturing sector, concessions to unions to keep industry operating during a time of war, and a general policy of federal support for private sector collective bargaining. After WWII, the growth of an anti-union business class and the beginning of a shift to neoliberal economic policy resulted in a steady erosion of organized labor's power. By the 1970s and 1980s, a combination of forces resulted in unionism's steady decline ever since. These trends included employer anti-union offensives, weakened labor laws, the exodus of many manufacturing jobs to foreign countries, and the "hunker down" mentality of the many unions, which failed to organize new members.

SEIU's leadership, including President Stern, envisions these agreements as mechanisms to preempt this anti-union offensive and take pro-active steps to organize more workers. Without employer agreements, supporters contend, organizing drives would routinely fail in the face of union-busting tactics ranging from management harassment and intimidation to firing workers for involvement in union activities. Stern argues that these "value-added employer relationships" which include "assisting employers in overcoming unnecessary legislative and political obstacles" are a needed innovation in today's globalized labor market. According to Stern and his backers, employer partnerships help achieve SEIU's primary goal of industry-wide unionization in the building services, the public sector, and the healthcare industry. Despite employer hostility and the union-growth imperative, SMART argues that a mantra of organizing by "any means necessary" has sidelined democratic participation and compromised workers ability to mobilize for wage and benefit gains.

== SMART activities ==
To voice its demands for increased union democracy, SMART members have mobilized demonstrations against local mergers and trusteeships, engaged in member outreach and awareness, and maintained a website ([www.reformseiu.org]) for communication and coordination between service employees throughout the country. SMART has also conducted workshops to assist reform-minded rank-and-file members planning to run for local union offices. In June 2008 SMART members attended SEIU's convention in Puerto Rico forming a delegation of reformers who gave speeches criticizing and questioning international union policies. Convention delegates representing SMART also proposed constitutional amendments opposing employer partnerships that limit rank-and-file participation in bargaining units.

Although reform-minded delegates did not have the numbers to win passage of their proposed amendments, activism at the Puerto Rico convention has sparked further interest in and mobilization for SMART's goals. Since the convention, a growing number of labor movement progressives outside SEIU, students labor activists, and community leaders have criticized the international's policies. While SMART members continue to work for a louder voice within their union and increased participation in contract negotiations over their wages and benefits, the internal reform movement extends beyond SEIU. SMART members offer a revisionist vision of the organizing model that SEIU pioneered—a vision that couples union growth with rank-and-file empowerment. As one rank-and-filer explained, "at this table, there's got to be a place for a regular old worker who has worked for thirty years to grow this union."
