= Golden Mike Award =

Broadcast journalism award in Southern California

- Awarded for: Distinguished achievement in television news and radio news
- Country: United States
- Presented by: Radio and Television News Association of Southern California
- First award: 1950; 76 years ago
- Website: rtnasocal.org

The Golden Mike Award is a broadcast journalism award presented by the Radio and Television News Association (RTNA) of Southern California. Awards are given in the categories of television news and radio news. Eligibility is limited to a select group of Southern California counties. Golden Mike (i.e., "microphone") Awards are presented at a gala dinner in Hollywood every January.

== History ==
The RTNA started out as the Southern California Newscasters Association. Golden Mike Awards were first given out in 1950.

== Award details ==
Eligibility for a Golden Mike Award is limited to the California counties of Los Angeles, Orange, San Diego, Riverside, San Bernardino, Ventura, Santa Barbara, San Luis Obispo, Fresno, Imperial, Inyo, Kern, Kings, and Tulare.

The awards are divided into two categories: TV and Radio. Depending on the size of the station in question, each award is divided into two categories, A and B. In the television category, Division A comprises stations with 50 or more full-time news staff members, while Division B comprises stations with fewer than 50 full-time news staff members. In the radio category, Division A is made up of stations with 6 or more full-time news staff members, and Division B is made up of stations with 5 or fewer full-time news staff members.

Not every category (or division) is necessarily awarded each year. As stated on the Golden Mike Award website, "if the judges decide that no entry in a category meets the 'Standard of Excellence,' then no award is given in that category.... As a result, Golden Mike Award winners know that their work has been judged to be 'excellent', as well as the 'best'."

=== TV categories ===
- Best News Broadcast – 60 Minutes – Airing Between 4 pm and Midnight Only
- Best News Broadcast – 30 Minutes or Less – Airing Between 4 pm and Midnight Only
- Best Daytime News Broadcast – Any Length – Airing Between Midnight and 4 pm
- Best Sports Segment
- Best Weather Segment
- Best Traffic Report
- Best Newscast Writing
- Best Individual Writing
- Best Sports Reporting
- Best Spot News Reporting
- Best Live Coverage of a News Story
- Best Documentary
- Best News Public Affairs Program
- Best News Reporting
- Best News Reporting by a Cable or Broadcast Network
- Best Hard News Series Reporting
- Best Light News Series Reporting
- Best News Special
- Best Investigative Reporting
- Best Serious Feature Reporting
- Best Light Feature Reporting
- Best Entertainment Reporting
- Best Business and Consumer Reporting
- Best Government and Political Reporting
- Best Medical and Science Reporting
- Best News Videography of a Hard News Story, Series or Special
- Best News Videography of a Feature Story, Series or Special
- Best Video Editing of a Hard News Story, Series or Special
- Best Video Editing of a Feature Story, Series or Special
- Best Internet News Reporting

=== Radio categories ===
- Best News Broadcast
- Best News Broadcast Under 15 Minutes
- Best Newscast Writing
- Best Sports Segment
- Best Traffic Report
- Best Individual Writing
- Best Sports Reporting
- Best "Spot" News Reporting
- Best "Live" Coverage of a News Story
- Best Documentary
- Best News Public Affairs Program
- Best News Reporting
- Best News Reporting by a Radio Network or Content Syndicator
- Best Hard News Series Reporting
- Best Feature News Series Reporting
- Best Investigative Reporting
- Best Serious Feature Reporting – One Minute or Longer
- Best Serious Feature Reporting – Shorter Than One Minute
- Best Light Feature Reporting – One Minute or Longer
- Best Light Feature Reporting – Shorter Than One Minute
- Best News Special
- Best Entertainment Reporting
- Best Business and Consumer Reporting
- Best Government and Political Reporting
- Best Medical and Science Reporting
- Best Use of Sound
- Best Internet News Reporting

== Recipients ==
Individual recipients of the Golden Mike Award include Robert Kovacik, Keith Olberman, Frank Mottek, Carlos Amezcua, Joan Van Ark, Greg Barron, Richard Beebe, Bill Bertka, Sam Chu Lin, David Cruz (journalist), Leila Feinstein, Laurie Fernandez, Michael Finney, Christina Gonzalez, Henry Goren, Bill Griffeth, Maria Hall-Brown, Mike Hodel, Sharon Ito, Patricia Janiot, Sharon Janis, Jaime Jarrín, Sandra Maas, Paul Magers, John Mattes, Felicitas Méndez, Sylvia Mendez, Tracey Miller, Byron Miranda, Conan Nolan, Dallas Raines, Rick Reiff, Sam Rubin, Michele Ruiz, Marta Russell, Cara Santa Maria, Matt Schrader, Mark Steines, D Stevens, Marcos Villatoro, and Marta Waller.

Golden Mike Lifetime Achievement and "Broadcast Legend" Award-winners include Larry King, Regis Philbin, and Bob Miller.

With 12 wins, TV reporter Robert Kovacik has collected the most Golden Mike Awards, with Keith Olberman coming in second with 11 Golden Mikes. Frank Mottek has also won the award multiple times, with five Golden Mikes.

Between 2001 and 2010, KCLU-FM won more than 60 Golden Mike Awards.

== Other Golden Mike/Mic awards ==
Over the years, a number of organizations in the U.S., the Far East, and South Asia have given out so-called "Golden Mike Awards", for journalists, broadcasters, and public speakers (with "mike" or "mic" referring to a microphone). For example:

- Golden Mike Award presented by the Broadcasters Foundation of America
- Golden Mike Award for Women in Radio and Television presented by McCall's from 1951 to 1967
- Golden Mike Award presented by the American Federation of Television and Radio Artists in the 1970s
- Golden Mike Award presented by United Press International in the 1970s and 1980s
- Golden Mike Award presented by the Broadcast Pioneers in the 1980s
- Golden Mike Award presented by the National Religious Broadcasters (NRB) in the 1990s
- Golden Mike Award presented by the National Speakers Association in the 1990s
- Golden Mike Award presented by the Louisville Chapter of the Society of Professional Journalists in the 1990s
- Golden Mike Award presented by the New Hampshire Association of Broadcasters (NHAB) from 1993 into the 2000s
- Golden Mike Award of the Chinese People's Republic presented from the 1990s into the 2010s
- Golden Mike Award presented by the Louisiana Association of Broadcasters in the 2010s
- Golden Mike Award presented in India for achievement in radio in the 2010s
- Golden Mic Awards of Singapore's Mediacorp presented from 1998 to 2016 (originally known as the Singapore Radio Awards)

In addition, the Billboard Music Awards presents a trophy in the shape of a golden microphone to each winner.
