= Marta Russell =

American journalist

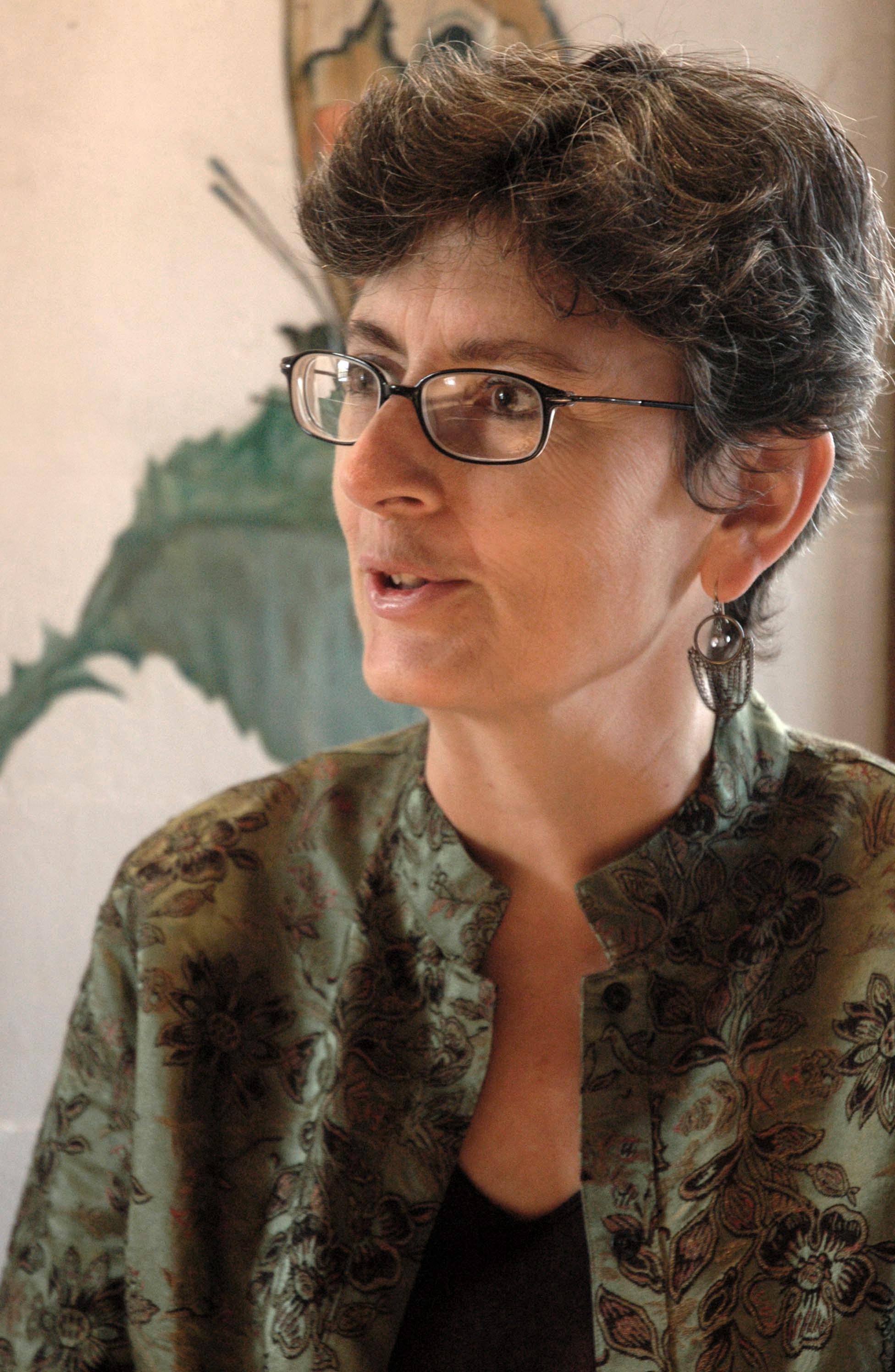
- Marta Russell (2005)
- Born: December 20, 1951
- Died: December 15, 2013 (aged 61)
- Website: martarussell.org

Marta Russell (December 20, 1951 – December 15, 2013) was an American writer and disability rights activist. Her book, Beyond Ramps: Disability at the End of the Social Contract, published in 1998 by Common Courage Press, analyzes the relationship between disability, social Darwinism, and austerity. Her political views, which she described as "left, not liberal," informed her writing on topics such as health care, the prison–industrial complex, assisted suicide, poverty, ableism, and the Americans with Disabilities Act of 1990.

== Biography ==
Russell grew up in the Mississippi Delta, born into an old Southern family that lived on their cotton farm. She was diagnosed with cerebral palsy as an infant. During her childhood, she underwent numerous surgeries attempting to improve her mobility. The surgeries were without positive results.

As a young adult, Russell was a part of the civil rights movement, volunteering for the American Civil Liberties Union to fight against racial segregation in the United States.

Russell attended the Memphis College of Art and received a Bachelor of Fine Arts degree. She moved to Los Angeles, California, in her early twenties to pursue a career in film. Russell attended the American Film Institute and worked in visual effects, including as background composite supervisor for Tron.

As her disability progressed, she began to write about her experiences navigating disability policy and became more involved with disability rights groups such as ADAPT. Also a photographer and producer in addition to her writing, Russell was recognized in 1994 with an award from the City of Los Angeles Commission on Disabilities for her contributions to disability in the media. Russell was a co-producer and correspondent for the KCET documentary entitled Disabled & the Cost of Saying 'I Do' (1995), which received a Golden Mike Award.

She also demonstrated against the 2003 US war on Iraq.

In addition to writing for New Mobility, and the Monthly Review, Russell contributed articles to journals such as the Journal of Disability Policy Studies and the Socialist Register as well as newspapers such as the Los Angeles Daily News.

Russell has one daughter named Georgia Scheele.

== Legacy ==
In 2016, Routledge published an anthology entitled, Disability Politics in a Global Economy: Essays in Honour of Marta Russell, edited by Ravi Malhotra.

A second edition of Beyond Ramps was released in ebook format in 2016, with a new foreword by Ravi Malhotra.

In 2019, Haymarket Books published a book of Russell's writings entitled Capitalism & Disability: Selected Writings by Marta Russell, edited by Keith Rosenthal.

== Bibliography ==
=== Books ===
- Rosenthal, Keith, ed. (2019). Capitalism & disability: essays by Marta Russell. Chicago: Haymarket Books. ISBN 978-1-60846-686-3.
- Russell, Marta (1998). Beyond ramps: disability at the end of the social contract. Monroe: Common Courage Press. ISBN 978-1-56751-107-9.

=== Articles ===
- "The Medicaid Kill-Off". Monthly Review. August 15, 2005.
- "Targeting Disability". Monthly Review. Vol. 56, no. 11. April 2005.
- "Too Many Human Rights". TomPaine.com. Archived from the original on 20 September 2003.
- "Capitalism and Disability". Socialist Register. 38. With Ravi Malhotra. 2002.
- Russell, Marta (Fall 2001). "Disablement, Oppression, and the Political Economy". Journal of Disability Policy Studies. 12 (2): 87–95. doi:10.1177/104420730101200205.
- "Disablement, Prison, and Historical Segregation". Monthly Review. Vol. 53, no. 3. With Jean Stewart. July–August 2001.
- Russell, Marta (March 2000). "Backlash, the Political Economy, and Structural Exclusion". Berkeley Journal of Employment & Labor Law. 21 (1). doi:10.15779/Z386K98.
