= Anna Burger =

American labor leader

Anna Burger (born September 27, 1950) was the Secretary-Treasurer of Service Employees International Union (SEIU) and Chair of the Change to Win Federation.

In February 2009, Burger was appointed as a member to the President's Economic Recovery Advisory Board to provide the president and his administration with advice and counsel in fixing America's economic downturn. For 2011 she was a Fellow at Harvard University's Advanced Leadership Initiative.

== Biography ==
Burger, born in Levittown, Pennsylvania, and daughter of a disabled truck driver and a nurse, began her activist career in 1972 as a welfare worker. It was there she became involved in her local union. Burger organized a walkout in efforts to create a safer working environment for the office. Burger became more active in her union, and quickly moved through the ranks of the local union. Burger became SEIU local 668's first full-time woman president before moving onto the SEIU International office in Washington, DC, to work as National Director of Field Operations, under former SEIU president John Sweeney. Burger successfully ran Sweeney's campaign for president of the AFL-CIO. She was elected Executive Vice President of SEIU, and Secretary-Treasurer in 2001, and announced her retirement on August 11, 2010.

Burger and Stern called for a change in the AFL-CIO's strategies in June 2004. By the summer of 2005, 6 unions (including SEIU) withdrew their membership to the AFL-CIO, and created a new labor coalition, the Change to Win Federation. On September 27, 2005, Burger was elected Chair of the breakaway coalition. As the Chair of Change to Win, Burger became the first woman to lead an American labor coalition.

In December 2009, the conservative Americans for Tax Reform organization formally requested a federal investigation of Burger, claiming that she is an unregistered lobbyist, in violation of the Lobbyist Disclosure Act. However, upon investigating the matter, the U.S. Senate Secretary found the alleged charge of Burger as a federal lobbyist to be false, and closed her office's file on the matter.

Burger is married to Earl F. Gohl and they have one daughter. She and her husband live in Washington, D.C..

Trade union offices
Preceded by Betty Bednarczyk	Secretary-Treasurer of the Service Employees International Union; 2001–2010	Succeeded by Eliseo Medina
