= Justice for Janitors =

Social movement organization

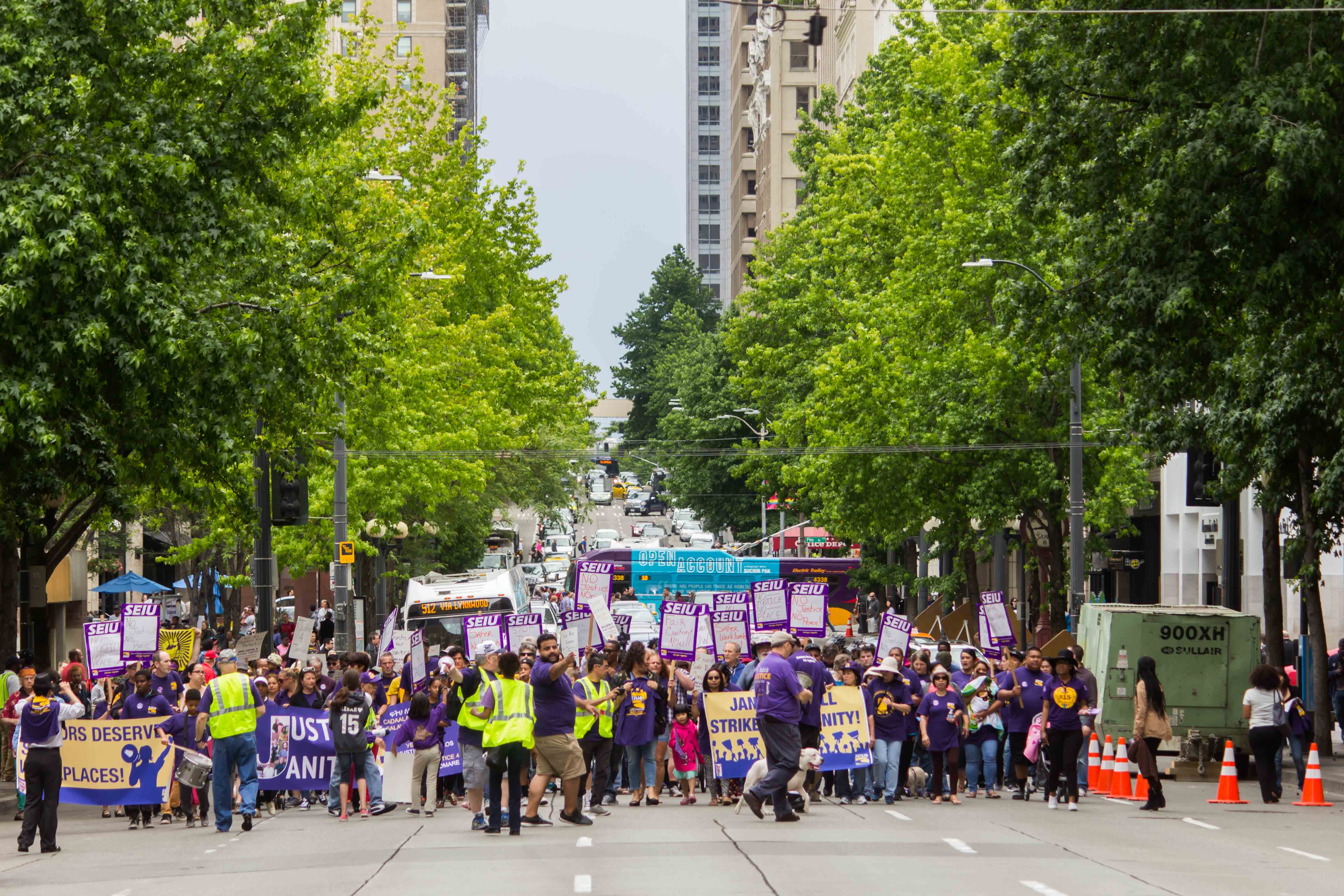

Justice for Janitors (JfJ) is a social movement organization that fights for the rights of janitors (caretakers and cleaners) across the US and Canada. It was started on June 15, 1990, in response to the low wages and minimal health-care coverage that janitors received. Justice for Janitors includes more than 225,000 janitors in at least 29 cities in the United States and at least four cities in Canada. Members fight for better wages, better conditions, improved healthcare, and full-time opportunities.

The Justice for Janitors campaigns are organized under a larger union known as the Service Employees International Union (SEIU). SEIU has almost two million members and is a large part of the labor movement. SEIU assists in organizing Justice for Janitors campaigns. SEIU retains constructive partnerships with the corporations employing the janitors to ensure that these corporations receive no negative impact due to the campaigns.

== Background ==
In 1985, the Service Employees International Union (SEIU), under the leadership of John J. Sweeney, began the Justice for Janitors campaign, which was more of a movement than a traditional strike. The SEIU hoped that the campaign would improve the socio-economic circumstances of workers from the custodial services industry, who were mostly immigrants and people of color, and would mobilize oppressed communities to counter entrenched racism through community-organization and civil disobedience. (Kelley, 52) As the labor movement was struggling to gain membership to unions, new models for organizing workers were developed. The Justice for Janitors campaign uses a bottom-up model in which they organize workers based on geographical area rather than just their worksite. This structure improves the visibility of workers by grouping them together. The structure used by SEIU for its Justice for Janitors campaigns has been widely recognized for its innovativeness and success. Justice for Janitors organizers drew upon lessons from the civil rights movement to conduct demonstrations that increased public awareness of the economic grievances and racial discrimination that service workers encountered in large urban areas, such as Los Angeles and Washington, D.C. Justice for Janitors was founded on June 15, 1990, when Janitors in Los Angeles, CA had a peaceful march to protest low wages of janitors. The percentage of janitors unionized in Los Angeles had significantly increased from 10 percent of workforce in 1987 to 90 percent workforce in 1995 greatly in-part of the movement. The linked connections the movement had with community leaders, such as the Black and Latino organizations, churches, and activists allowed for the strikers to receive the attention needed to be granted their demands throughout the entire city of Los Angeles. The success stretched beyond obtaining concessions from downtown luxury offices and the SEIU (Local 399) headquarters but also into the streets and boardrooms of the city, which paved the way for "a powerful mass movement." (Kelley, 53) It is important to remember that the SEIU in Los Angeles was heavily composed of immigrant workers who were faced with a huge challenge, Proposition 187. Proposition 187 denied immigrants of their basic rights and had just recently been passed, which was not favorable, in any way, for the immigrant workers, obviously. The Janitors for Justice campaign began with Stephen Lerner, a former United Farm Workers (UFW) organizer and later head of SEIU's janitorial division in D.C. Lerner was placed in Denver for his first janitor's organizing drive. Lerner acknowledges the influence of his work with United Farm Workers, and Justice for Janitors "was enormously influenced by the tactics…of the farmworkers movement." Janitors for Justice employed UFW tactics, such as vivid imagery of the exploitation of workers, demonstrations, street theater, hunger strikes, vigils, blockades, clergy–labor alliance, and community organizing. In Washington D.C., the Justice for Janitors Strike alongside SEIU Local 82 fought against U.S. Service Industries; U.S. Service Industries was a private janitorial company of nonunion workers that was hired for their services at the downtown luxury buildings. (Kelley, 53) In March 1995, the movement conducted several demonstrations, that blocked off street/traffic movement as well as other forms of civil disobedience, to protest their rights and demands, which resulted in over 200 arrests. The protesters were clear and direct with their demands; they wanted to end tax breaks for real estate developers and cutback social programs designated for the poor. Manny Pastreich, spokesperson of the union, even declared, “This isn’t just about 5,000 janitors; it’s about issues that concern all D.C. residents - what’s happening to their schools, their streets, their neighborhoods.” (Kelley, 53) In the end, the strike resulted in being more than just a traditional strike, as expressed earlier, it was now a powerful mass movement looking out for everyone, no matter age, race, status, and everything, no matter building, location, object. Justice for Janitors even adopted the rallying cry of the United Farm Workers: "¡Sí se puede!"

== Campaigns ==
The Justice for Janitors campaigns often use strong tactics to get their point across. SEIU sends trained organizers to local unions in order to organize campaigns. The campaigns of Justice for Janitors also use master contracts that are market wide. One contract in a certain market will apply to all union janitors across that market. This allows union workers to fight for different rights while applying any accomplishments to all workers in that market.

=== Los Angeles campaign ===
During the 1980s, janitors working for large real estate owners had become victims of competition and lowered wages. The large real estate companies sent out cleaning services to the building service contractors. These contractors were in high competition with each other and therefore cut wages for their cleaning services.

In 1983, an average janitor working in LA had a salary of over $7.00 an hour ($17.20 in 2017 dollars adjusted for inflation) and full health insurance coverage for the janitor and his/her family. By 1986, the janitorial wages had been cut to a mere $4.50/hour ($10.05 in 2017 dollars adjusted for inflation), and health insurance coverage was no longer an option. By the late 1980s, janitors began to fight against these large owners and contractors. Janitors that were members of the SEIU joined in the Justice for Janitors campaign using militant and direct action tactics. They wanted to hold both the owners and the contractors accountable.

The Los Angeles campaign has been notable for the fact that many of the janitors were immigrants, most of them were women, and almost all were Latina/o all groups which have traditionally been viewed by unions as difficult to organize. Unions made deep connections in immigrant communities involving community groups, immigrants' rights groups, and the personal networks that already existed among workers.

The Justice for Janitors campaign showed how unions changed their strategies to organize women, this strike wasn't only about wage cuts, but also about gender equality for women and Immigrants' rights. The Los Angeles Justice for Janitors union movement is well known for its mass protests where hundreds of mostly undocumented immigrant women and men from Mexico, and other central and South American countries disrupt the private and public spaces surrounding the buildings where they worked.

The Justice for Janitors campaign came from Denver to LA in 1988. They worked in downtown to represent the union base and organize the non-union companies. The Justice for Janitors organizers focused on "double-breasted" companies, which were "firms with both union and nonunion operations under different names." The first campaign was directed toward Century Cleaning.

The official strike of Janitors for Justice in Los Angeles began on April 3, 1990. The janitors marched and held demonstrations during the daytime for the 3 weeks. To help their cause, many religious leaders, community leaders, and politicians joined the action of the janitors and supported their protests. The archbishop of Los Angeles, Cardinal Roger Mahony, held a special mass for the janitors. Also, mayor Richard Riordan joined the campaign by voicing his support for the janitors and their union. The janitors in Los Angeles stayed on strike until April 22. By this time, they had reached a contract that guaranteed at least a 22% raise over the next three years.

The Los Angeles strike was significant to the future of Justice for Janitors as it spurred a nationwide campaign involving over 100,000 SEIU janitors in 2000. The campaign sought to raise wages for all janitors as well as improve overall working conditions. SEIU's Los Angeles Justice for Janitors campaign was portrayed in the motion picture Bread and Roses.

=== Houston campaign ===
Currently, many janitors in Houston, Texas are organizing through the Justice for Janitors campaigns. In July 2005, Houston janitors secured a check and neutrality agreement from the five largest cleaning contractors in Houston. In November 2005, four of the five contractors recognized SEIU as representing a majority of each contractor's workers, and in December, the fifth contractor did as well.

In 2005 in Houston, the average janitor was earning an hourly salary of $5.25, compared to $20 in New York City and $13.30 in Philadelphia and Chicago. The success of the Houston campaign was surprising due to the South's history of resistance to unionization and hostility to labor. The success of service employees was decreasing in 2005, as the percentage of private-sector workers dropped to 7.9. Julius Getman, a labor law professor at the University of Texas, says the Justice for Janitors effort is "the largest unionization campaign in the South in years." The AFL-CIO attempted a campaign in the 1980s known as the Houston Organizing Project, as the companies fought hard during a suffering economy to defeat the unionization effort.

The Houston campaign succeeded with the help of prominent allies in the community, a common tactic used by the SEIU. They received the support from the mayor of Houston, several congressmen, clergymen, such as Joseph Fiorenza, the Roman Catholic archbishop. The clergy–labor alliance is a strong tactic first used by the UFW and Cesar Chavez, and it has been adopted by numerous labor groups because it helps gain support from the community by legitimizing the effort as a spiritual quest for justice. For example, Archbishop Fiorenza said in an interview about the Houston campaign that it is "basic justice and fairness that the wages should be increased." He held a special mass for janitors and spoke at the union's kick-off rally. The workers in Houston were also aided by pickets in Chicago, Los Angeles, New York, and elsewhere, where workers for the same employers refused to cross picket lines in solidarity with their fellow janitors in Houston.

On November 20, 2006, a few days after dozens of strikers and their supporters were arrested by Houston police while engaging in nonviolent civil disobedience, a tentative agreement was reached between striking Houston janitors and employers. The proposed settlement included many concessions from employers, and SEIU was quick to declare victory.

=== Miami campaign ===
The University of Miami Justice for Janitors campaign officially began in February 2006. However, the precursors to this effort began as early as October 2001, when the University of Miami Faculty Senate began passing declarations to the University of Miami president, Donna Shalala. The declarations suggested that the university comply with the Miami-Dade County Living Wage Ordinance. At this time, there was little response to the resolutions provided.

In February 2005, SEIU janitors began organizing at both Miami Beach condominiums, employed by Continental Group, as well as janitors working for the University of Miami. SEIU also used the help of the South Florida Interfaith Worker Justice (SFIWJ). By the fall of 2005, they had also enlisted the help of students at the University of Miami. An organization called STAND, Students Toward a New Democracy, had members attend direct action training workshops in San Francisco, paid for by SEIU. STAND had managed to rally over 300 students for an email list and received 800 signatures from undergraduates on a petition demanding better worker pay.

On February 26, 2006, the janitors issued an unfair labor practice strike that would last nine weeks. Many of the professors at the University of Miami signed a pledge to support the strike. This meant that the professors would be holding classes off-campus in order to avoid crossing the janitors' picket lines.

On March 16, 2006, Shalala capitulated and announced a wage raise of at least 25%. SEIU celebrated this gain, but they contained to prepare for further action at the University of Miami.

On March 28, the tactics began to receive significant media attention. Clergy and students began blocking traffic on U.S. Route 1. 17 of the activists were arrested for blocking a major highway. At the same time, students were infiltrating the University of Miami admissions office. Here, the students argued with Shalala for four hours until she finally agreed to attend a meeting to discuss the current situation.

The last stage of the campaign consisted of hunger strikes that led the University of Miami to feel a sense of crisis. Many of the strike's participants were hospitalized as a result of their extensive fasting.

Due to the escalating sense of crisis on the university's campus, Shalala finally gave in. She proposed an even higher pay increase along with health benefits and a generous holiday break including paid personal days and paid holidays.

=== Boston Campaign ===
In an effort to demand higher wages, janitors in Boston under the SEIU 254 Justice for Janitors campaign had been planning to strike in the beginning of September 2002, but due to Mayor Thomas M. Menino's intervention, the plans were delayed. The walkout was then planned for and took place on September 30, 2002. Around 2,000 janitors walked out and walked the streets of Downtown Boston, holding signs and chanting in both English and Spanish. The janitors participating in the march were employed by UNICCO, and walked out of their places of employment such as institutions like Harvard and Northeastern University. Janitors were joined by students who supported the movement.

Former maid, Rocio Saenz, of the Local 254 of the SEIU in Boston, said “'janitors in New York, Chicago and San Francisco have health insurance, and when you consider that Boston is a world class city and has the second-highest rents in the nation, we don't understand it when the cleaning contractors say they can't afford to pay health insurance.''

This initial strike in Boston did not achieve the success its predecessor campaigns did, which some people expected. Some later campaigns at MIT were more successful in obtaining workers higher wages.

== Criticism ==
Criticism of the Justice for Janitors campaign is typically centered on non-democratic union processes and quick, trigger agreements. When local Service Employees International Union officials refused to participate in Justice for Janitor campaigns, their supervisors would remove them from office, and replace them with "trustees to run the locals, then running the trustees for the presidency." At this time, the SEIU merged many smaller city or local offices into regional or state-wide offices, reaching multiple industries, making it difficult for rank and file individuals to compete for organizational and office positions with the more formal, staff-run organizations. Those concerned over trigger agreements worried that the agreements were too lenient, giving too many concessions to the contractors. Criticism of the trigger agreements was quickly snuffed out after the SEIU won a rolling strike for healthcare benefits in 2000. Furthermore, despite successes elsewhere, Justice for Janitors has struggled to create and maintain campaigns in the American South and in suburban areas where janitorial services have grown at rate beyond the organizing capacity of SEIU. Another criticism of the SEIU is they unfairly use tactics against companies that cost jobs, diverting company resources into expensive legal battles.

== See also ==
- Organising model
- Union organizer

== Notes ==
1. “Houston Janitor Strike Ends With Agreement,” Washington Post, November 21, 2006
2. Greenhouse, Steven (21 November 2006). "Cleaning Companies in Accord With Striking Houston Janitors". The New York Times.
