= Service Employees International Union =

North American trade union

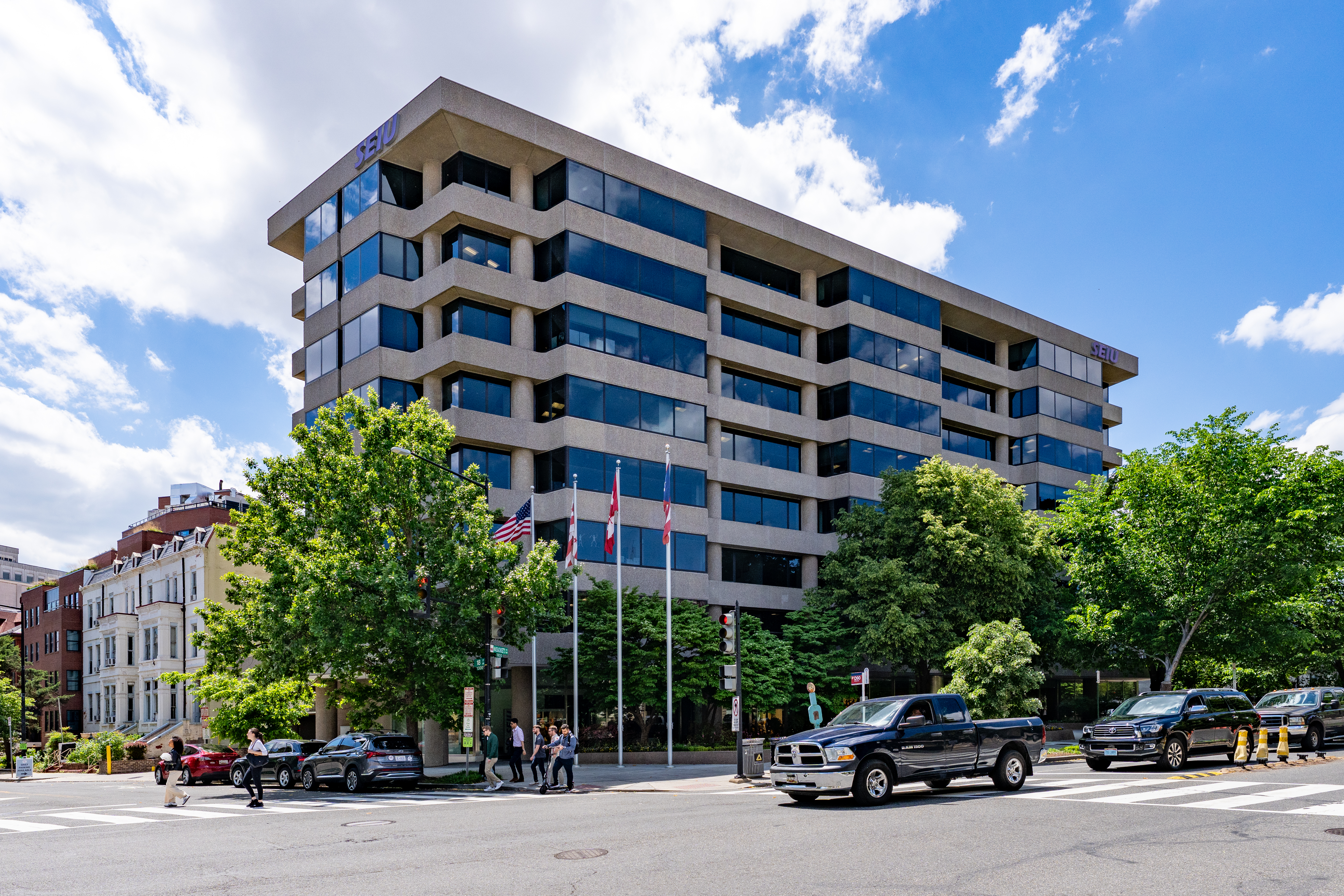
- Headquarters in Washington, D.C.
- Abbreviation: SEIU
- Formation: April 23, 1921; 105 years ago
- Type: Trade union
- Headquarters: Washington, D.C., U.S.
- Members: 1,901,161 (US); 130,000 (Canada) (2019)
- President: April Verrett
- Secretary-treasurer: Rocío Sáenz
- Affiliations: AFL-CIO; Canadian Labour Congress; Public Services International; Strategic Organizing Center; UNI Global Union
- Website: seiu.org
- Formerly called: Building Service Employees International Union

Service Employees International Union (SEIU) is a labor union representing 2 million workers in over 100 occupations in the United States, Canada, and Puerto Rico. SEIU is focused on organizing workers in three sectors: healthcare (over half of members work in the healthcare field), including hospital, home care and nursing home workers; public services (government employees, including law enforcement); and property services (including janitors, security guards and food service workers).

SEIU has over 150 local branches. It is affiliated with the AFL-CIO, the Strategic Organizing Center, and the Canadian Labour Congress. SEIU's international headquarters is located in Washington, D.C., and it is one of the largest unions in the country.

The union is known for its strong support for Democratic candidates. It spent $28 million supporting Barack Obama in the 2008 presidential election. In 2012, SEIU was the top outside spender on Democratic campaigns, reporting almost $70 million of campaign donations, television ads and get-out-the-vote efforts in support of President Obama and other Democrats. SEIU is a major supporter of the Affordable Care Act and of increased minimum wage laws, including wage increases for fast food workers. The union is the primary backer of the Fight for $15.

== History ==
The SEIU was founded on April 23, 1921 in Chicago as the Building Service Employees International Union (BSEIU); its first members were janitors, elevator operators, and window washers. The union's membership increased significantly with a 1934 strike in New York City's Garment District. In order to reflect its increasingly diversified membership, in 1968 the union renamed itself Service Employees International Union. In 1980 through 1984, most of the SEIU's growth came from mergers with four other unions, including the International Jewelry Workers' Union and the Drug, Hospital, and Health Care Employees Union.

In 1995, SEIU President John Sweeney was elected president of the AFL–CIO, the main confederation of labor unions in the United States. After Sweeney's departure, former social worker Andrew Stern was elected president of SEIU. In the first ten years of Stern's administration, the union's membership grew rapidly and the SEIU became the largest union in the AFL–CIO.

In 2003, SEIU was a founding member of the New Unity Partnership, an organization of unions that pushed for a greater commitment to organizing unorganized workers into unions. In 2005, SEIU was a founding member of the Change to Win Coalition, which furthered the reformist agenda. Their differences with AFL-CIO boiled over on the eve of the 2005 AFL–CIO convention, as the SEIU and Teamsters announced that they were disaffiliating from the AFL–CIO, and boycotting the convention. The Change to Win Federation held its founding convention in September 2005, where SEIU Secretary-Treasurer Anna Burger was announced as the organization's chair.

In the following decade, several Change to Win members disaffiliated and re-joined the AFL–CIO, leaving SEIU, the Teamsters, and the United Farm Workers as the remaining members. The SEIU's decision to break away from the AFL–CIO is considered controversial by some labor experts. After the disaffiliation, the SEIU continued to experience significant growth in membership. Stern stepped down as president of SEIU in 2010, and was replaced by Mary Kay Henry, a long-time organizer and staff member at the union, and its first female president.

April Verrett was elected the union's first Black president in May 2024.

On January 8, 2025, the SEIU announced that they had rejoined the AFL-CIO after a 20-year absence, bringing the total membership of the AFL-CIO to nearly 15 million members, a move which the Associated Press said would help increase the union's political power.

== Leadership ==
=== Presidents ===
- William Quesse (1921–1927)
- Oscar Nelson (1927)
- Jerry Horan (1927–1937)
- George Scalise (1937–1940)
- William McFetridge (1940–1960)
- David Sullivan (1960–1971)
- George Hardy (1971–1980)
- John Sweeney (1980–1995; subsequently president of the AFL–CIO)
- Richard Cordtz (1995–1996)
- Andy Stern (1996–2010)
- Mary Kay Henry (2010–2024)
- April Verrett (2024—present)

=== Secretary-Treasurers ===
1921: Paul David
1941: William P. Cooper
1955: George E. Fairchild
1976: Anthony Weinlein
1980: Richard Cordtz
1995: Betty Bednarczyk
2001: Anna Burger
2010: Eliseo Medina
2013: Mike Fishman
2016: Gerry Hudson
2022: April Verrett
2024: Rocío Sáenz

== Organizing and political activities ==
Under the Stern and Henry presidencies, SEIU has organized workers in a number of industries. In some cases, these organizing drives have been built around nationwide campaigns, like the earlier Justice for Janitors campaign. SEIU has organized large numbers of home care attendants in Oregon, Missouri, and Wisconsin, among other states, in some cases working together with other unions.

Since 2004, the union has seen success organizing workers in Texas, Florida, Nevada, and Arizona in particular. Over 5,000 janitors organized with SEIU in Houston, Texas in 2005, which was especially significant due to the size of the campaign and its location in an area with low union density. In Florida, a high-profile strike at the University of Miami which lasted nine weeks and included a hunger strike, ended with the union winning representation of 425 janitors on campus. This victory was shortly followed by another 600 workers at North Shore Medical Center, also in Miami, voting to join the SEIU in early 2006.

One of the major potential areas of union growth in the United States is organizing workers usually hitherto considered "unorganizable," especially low-wage service sector workers, in what is often called "social movement organizing." SEIU has played a major role in the fast food worker strikes from 2012–2014 and has contributed more than $15 million to workers' centers and community organizations to organize them. The motto for the campaign is "$15 and a union," reflecting the call to increase the minimum wage to $15 per hour and the unionization of fast food workers. SEIU has recently begun supporting lawsuits filed by fast food workers to the National Labor Relations Board, calling for McDonald's to be named a joint employer of the restaurants run by its franchisees, a move which would make it substantially easier to unionize McDonald's employees. Adjunct faculty at colleges and universities have been part of a similar campaign.

In June 2004, SEIU launched a non-union-member affiliate group called Purple Ocean as a mechanism to mobilize non-SEIU members in support of the union's agenda. Purple Ocean members do not have voting rights within the SEIU.

In November 2009, the SEIU and the National Union of Healthcare Workers (NUHW) competed for the right to represent 10,000 home health-care workers in Fresno, California. After the SEIU won the right to represent the workers, the NUHW charged the SEIU with changing ballots and threatening to report a worker to immigration officials. The NUHW asked that the election be invalidated and a new one ordered due to what it said was evidence of intimidation.

In 2012, SEIU, the American Federation of Teachers and AFSCME agreed on a politics-only alliance for the 2012 national election campaign. In 2016, AFSCME and SEIU announced an extension of that agreement, leading to speculation about a possible future merger.

In January 2015, the SEIU endorsed Hillary Clinton as the Democratic Party's nominee for the US Presidency, despite her opposition to the union's flagship "Fight for $15" campaign.

In July 2020, three SEIU members, Felix Thomson, Julia Wallace, and Mark Ostapiak, published an article in the media and organizing forum Labor Notes describing their participation in a campaign to disaffiliate police unions from the SEIU.

The Service Employees International Union challenged California's Proposition 22. The proposition was initially overturned in the lower courts before the decision was reversed in the Court of Appeal.

On November 15, 2023, President Joe Biden nominated Nicole Berner, the general counsel of the SEIU, to the United States Court of Appeals for the Fourth Circuit.

=== Sodexo ===
In 2009, the union launched a nationwide campaign against Sodexo, criticizing the company's labor standards. The union's strategy, which was ultimately unsuccessful, involved organizing student groups to pressure administrators at universities to kick Sodexo out of school cafeterias unless the company permitted unionization. Sodexo USA filed a civil lawsuit against SEIU under the Racketeer Influenced and Corrupt Organizations Act on March 17, 2011. In the complaint, Sodexo alleged that SEIU engaged in blackmail, vandalism, trespassing, harassment, and lobbying law violations, referring to the "Clean Up Sodexo" campaign as "old-fashioned, strongarm tactics" and SEIU behavior as "egregious" and "illegal."

During the trial, it was revealed that in 1988, the SEIU had co-written a manual detailing how "outside pressure can involve jeopardizing relationships between the employer and lenders, investors, stockholders, customers, clients, patients, tenants, politicians, or others on whom the employer depends for funds." Tactics recommended include references to blackmail and extortion, accusations of racism and sexism, targeting the homes and neighborhoods of business leaders for demonstrations, and also explicitly stated that at times it is necessary to "disobey the law." Following the court discovery of this document, a settlement was reached where Sodexo withdrew the lawsuit and SEIU terminated its public campaign focused on Sodexo.

=== Political donations ===
According to OpenSecrets, since 1990 the SEIU has been the nation's top organization contributing to federal campaigns, donating $232,694,670, 99 percent of which went to Democrats. Over that same period, the National Education Association was the second highest organizational political donor, contributing $96,992,506, 97 percent of which went to Democrats. Since 1998, the SEIU has spent $19,676,660 in additional money on lobbying.

== Local unions ==
=== 1199SEIU United Healthcare Workers East ===
SEIU's largest local union is 1199SEIU United Healthcare Workers East. With more than 400,000 members, it is the largest local healthcare union in the United States. It represents workers in various parts of New York state, chiefly in New York City, but also along the East Coast of the United States.

=== United Healthcare Workers West ===
SEIU Local 2005 United Healthcare Workers West (UHW West) is a large (150,000-member) local union based in Oakland, California. In August 2008, the international union announced plans for a hearing to consider trusteeing UHW West. On January 27, 2009, SEIU placed UHW West under trusteeship and dismissed 70 of the local's executives, including president Sal Rosselli. Rosselli and other ousted leaders reformed under the name National Union of Healthcare Workers and pushed for UHW West members at 60 facilities to vote to decertify SEIU. As of 2012, NUHW only represents 6 former SEIU-UHW facilities.

In early 2013, NUHW affiliated with the California Nurses Association. Also, in early 2013, the National Labor Relations Board (NLRB) ordered that the results of the 2010 Kaiser Permanente union election (a vote by nearly 45,000 Kaiser-Permanente employees choosing between NUHW and SEIU-UHW) be overturned based on evidence of collusion between SEIU-UHW and the employer. The second election was won be SEIU-UHW, by a vote of 18,844 to 13,101.

=== Local 32BJ ===
SEIU 32BJ is a politically outspoken building services local based in New York. 32BJ represents over 170,000 property service workers, and is part of SEIU Justice for Janitors, Stand for Security and Multi Service Workers campaigns.

In 2010, SEIU 32BJ's Thomas Shortman Training Fund was awarded a $2.8 million grant by the Department of Labor, as part of the American Recovery and Reinvestment Act aiming to create jobs in expanding green industries over the following two years. The program (1,000 Green Supers) was intended to help train 2,200 New York City building superintendents in energy efficiency.

The National Conference of Firemen and Oilers is an affiliate of 32BJ.

=== Local 87 ===
One of the first SEIU locals was Local 87, a local California union that traces its origins back to the 1920s, when it was known as Local 9 of the Building Service Employees International Union (BSEIU). It was originally led by George Hardy. Around 700 janitorial members of the local launched a walk-off on March 24, 2021, striking in favor of workplace safety measures including "sexual harassment safeguards", of fair pay, and of seniority rights. The strike follows 8 months of contract negotiations, 27 deaths to COVID-19 among union members, and 3000 members laid off since the start of the pandemic.

=== Local 721 ===
SEIU Local 721 is Los Angeles County's largest employee union, representing 57,000 county employees in nursing, social work, and clerical roles.

=== Local 221 ===
SEIU Local 221 represents over 13,000 workers in San Diego County, California and in Imperial County, California.

=== Local 2015 ===
SEIU Local 2015 represents 425,000 long-term care employees, making it the largest local union in California and the second largest in the United States. In November 2022, Local 2015 staff went on strike against the union in one of the largest union staff strikes in history.

=== Local 1000 ===
SEIU Local 1000 (Union of California State Workers) is the largest union for state workers in California. It is affiliated with the California State Employees Association (CSEA) and the California State University Employees Union, SEIU Local 2579, a non-union affiliate of managers, confidential and supervisory employees who are excluded from collective bargaining. SEIU Local 1000 represents 95,000 State Government Employees, many of whom are office and administrative workers, librarians, engineers and nurses. Local 1000 deals with issues of concern to current rank-and-file state employees, such as salaries, benefits, working conditions and contract negotiations. Local 1000 has nine bargaining units and represents a variety of state workers, including DMV employees, prison support staff (excluding uniformed guards), information technology workers, nurses and administrative staff.

Yvonne Walker served as the president of Local 1000 from 2008 to 2021. She was the first woman and first African American to hold the position.

In Knox v. Service Employees International Union, Local 1000, the US Supreme Court found Local 1000 had used illegal fundraising during the 2005 California Special Election.

The union held a one day strike on October 21, 2026, its first strike action. The union accused the state of California of failing to bargain in good faith after its contract expired in June 2026.

=== Committee of Interns and Residents ===
Committee of Interns and Residents Local 1957 is the largest housestaff union in the United States.

=== National Association of Government Employees (NAGE) ===
The National Association of Government Employees (NAGE), SEIU Local 5000, represents tens of thousands of state, federal, and municipal government employees including nurses, EMS professionals, firefighters, police and correctional officers, and military air technicians.

=== SEIU Healthcare (Local 1 Canada) ===
The largest local in Canada is SEIU Healthcare, formerly known as SEIU Local 1 Canada. It represents over 50,000 health care and community services workers in Ontario and British Columbia. Its members work in hospitals, home care, nursing and retirement homes and community services. In 2013 the union was re-branded SEIU Healthcare.

== Composition ==
View source data.

According to SEIU's Department of Labor records since 2005 (when membership classifications were first reported) about two percent of the union's membership are considered retirees, with eligibility to vote in the union. SEIU contracts also cover some non-members, known as agency fee payers, which since 2005 have numbered comparatively about one tenth of the size of the union's membership. As of 2014 this accounts for about 35,000 retirees and about 180,000 non-members paying agency fees, compared to about 1.8 million regular members.

== Archival and historical materials ==
The official repository of SEIU is the Walter P. Reuther Library of Labor and Urban Affairs at Wayne State University in Detroit. The Reuther Library, the largest labor archives in North America, holds the most complete collection of primary source materials regarding SEIU with over 1,000 linear feet of the union's records covering 105 years of history (1905-2010). The SEIU Collections include a variety of organizational, executive, photographic, and publicity materials along with many other additional record types. The relationship between SEIU and the Reuther Library began officially in 1992 and the collections have since been maintained by a dedicated SEIU Archivist on staff at the archives. Notable collections include SEIU Executive Office: John Sweeney Records, the District 925 Records, and materials documenting the Justice for Janitors campaign from SEIU's numerous local affiliates.

Additional archival collections can be found at the Special Collections Library of the University of Washington (Building Service Employees' International Union, Local 6 Records and Service Employees International Union, Local 120 Records). The records of SEIU's United Service Workers West, including the Justice for Janitors campaign are held by the UCLA Library Department of Special Collections.

== See also ==
- Leon J. Davis
- SEIU Member Activists for Reform Today
