= Strategic Organizing Center =

American coalition of labor unions

- Abbreviation: SOC
- Founded: September 27, 2005
- Type: Trade union center
- Headquarters: Washington, D.C., US
- Location: United States
- Website: thesoc.org
- Formerly called: Change to Win Federation

The Strategic Organizing Center (SOC), formerly known as the Change to Win Federation (CtWF), is a North American national trade union center originally formed in 2005 as an alternative to the AFL-CIO. The coalition is associated with strong advocacy of the organizing model. The coalition currently consists of Service Employees International Union (SEIU), the United Farm Workers (UFW), and the Communications Workers of America (CWA), the former and latter of which are affiliated with both the SOC and the AFL-CIO. Michael Zucker is currently listed as the Executive Director of the organization since 2020.

The SOC also includes SOC Investment Group, a shareholder engagement arm of the SOC that challenges management of large, publicly traded companies targeted by the SOC's campaigns.

== Changes in federation membership ==
National affiliations of current and former SOC affiliates since 2000

In the summer of 2009, the United Brotherhood of Carpenters disaffiliated from Change to Win.

After a bitter and divisive internal battle, a third of the members of UNITE HERE left that union and joined SEIU. The remaining 265,000 members of UNITE HERE reaffiliated with the AFL-CIO on September 16, 2009.

The Laborers' International Union of North America said it would also leave Change to Win and rejoin the AFL-CIO on August 13, 2010. LIUNA officials did not immediately explain their reasons, but AFL-CIO officials said the reaffiliation would be formalized in October 2010.

On August 8, 2013, the United Food and Commercial Workers announced that they would be leaving Change to Win and re-affiliating with the AFL-CIO.

On January 8, 2025, the Service Employees International Union (SEIU) announced that they are reuniting with the AFL-CIO, bringing the total membership of the AFL-CIO to nearly 15 million members.

== 2009 attempt at reunification with the AFL-CIO ==
On January 9, 2009, national news media reported that five of the seven CtW unions had met with seven of the largest unions in the AFL–CIO in talks which explored the possibility of the five CtW unions rejoining the larger labor federation. Impetus for the talks came as the Obama administration signalled to both labor federations that it preferred to deal with a united rather than fragmented labor movement. Also, several Change to Win unions also concluded that they were not getting any significant advantage from being in a separate labor federation, and that a fragmented labor union was doing more harm than good. David Bonior, a former US Congressman who once led the AFL-CIO's American Rights at Work division and who was a member of Barack Obama's presidential transition team, facilitated the meeting, and said talks were scheduled to last several weeks. The five CtW unions present included the Laborers, SEIU, the Teamsters, UFCW, and UNITE HERE. AFL-CIO unions present included AFSCME, the AFT, the Electrical Workers, the UAW, and the United Steelworkers. Also in attendance was Dennis Van Roekel, president of the National Education Association, which is independent and belongs to neither group.

A number of major issues were discussed in the opening round of talks. One major point of discussion revolved around who would lead any reunited federation. AFL-CIO President John Sweeney was widely expected to retire at the trade union center's August 2009 convention, and Laborer's president Terence O'Sullivan and AFL-CIO Secretary-Treasurer Richard Trumka had been discussed as his successors. The nature of the AFL-CIO presidency was part of the leadership talks, with some unions suggesting that the presidency rotate among member unions while others hoped for a strong and vocal "executive director" position. The two sides agreed that any reunited labor federation should have a stronger voice in national politics as well as have a greater say in helping member unions engage in more new member organizing. The two sides also discussed whether to change the name of the AFL-CIO, or whether to adopt an entirely new organizational structure. Among other issues discussed were: How the AFL-CIO/new organization would encourage new member organizing and at what level (national or local), what a reunited labor movement's political priorities should be, what sort of relationship a reunited labor movement will have with the Democratic and Republican parties, the level of member union dues, and globalization issues. Although one news outlet reported that the 12 unions hoped to settle on a reunification agreement by April 15, 2009, no issues were resolved in the first round of talks.

The talks drew some limited criticism from members of the labor movement for not addressing issues of union democracy.

== Amazon campaign ==
The SOC has worked with a number of different labor unions, think tanks and other advocacy organizations in recent years to address labor and competition issues at Amazon—the second-largest employer in the US. The SOC has worked to shine a light on health and safety issues at Amazon warehouses, antitrust concerns pertaining to Amazon acquisitions, such as the pending merger with MGM studios, and how the company uses its market power to impose unfair conditions on sellers using Amazon's e-commerce platform.

== Partner organizations ==
SOC Investment Group (formerly CtW Investment Group) is an affiliate that is co-located within the Strategic Organizing Center. SOC Investment Group advances SOC organizing campaigns by filing shareholder resolutions and engaging shareholders of publicly traded companies to vote against management. Examples of companies targeted include Amazon, McDonald's, Electronic Arts, and CVS Health. While SOC Investment Group is cited in media reports as an investment adviser that works with union-backed pensions, the group's website says it does not provide investment advice or act as a fiduciary for any pension funds.

== See also ==
- Canadian Labour Congress
- Labor federation competition in the United States
- Union organizer
