= Los Angeles Press Club =

American journalism organization

The Los Angeles Press Club is an American journalism organization founded in 1913. It honors journalists through its annual National Arts & Entertainment Journalism Awards and SoCal Journalism Awards. As of 2023, the Los Angeles Press Club hosted the 65th SoCal Journalism Awards and the 16th National Arts & Entertainment Journalism Awards in downtown Los Angeles.

In 2024, the Board of Directors includes the organization's president – Robert Kovacik of KNBC, vice president – Cher Calvin of KTLA, and treasurer Chris Palmeri of Bloomberg. The executive director is Swedish-born journalist Diana Ljungaeus.
