= Judith A. Winston =

Judith Winston
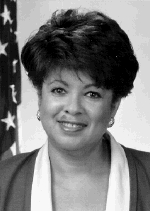

Personal details
- Born: November 23, 1943 (age 82) Atlantic City, New Jersey, U.S.
- Party: Democratic
- Spouse: Michael Winston
- Children: 2 daughters
- Education: Howard University (BA); Georgetown University (JD)

Judith A. Winston is a lawyer, education and civil rights policy consultant and former law professor, Undersecretary and General Counsel of the US Department of Education, and was one of the lead members of U.S. President-elect Barack Obama's Agency Review teams for the Departments of Education and Labor. She served as executive director to President Clinton's One America Initiative.

== Background ==
Winston has served as an Assistant General Counsel in the U.S. Department of Education and was worked in matters involving special education programs, bilingual education and English-language learners, and civil rights. She is a former Deputy Director of the Lawyers' Committee for Civil Rights Under Law, former Deputy Director for Public Policy of the National Partnership for Women and Families (formerly the Women's Legal Defense Fund) and former Executive Assistant and Legal Counsel to the Chair of the U.S. Equal Employment Opportunity Commission. She has also served as an associate professor and Research Professor of law at the Washington College of Law at American University . She has also served as a program director and research associate in urban education at the Council of Great City Schools. Winston is admitted to practice in the District of Columbia. She is a graduate of Georgetown University Law Center and a Phi Beta Kappa graduate of Howard University.

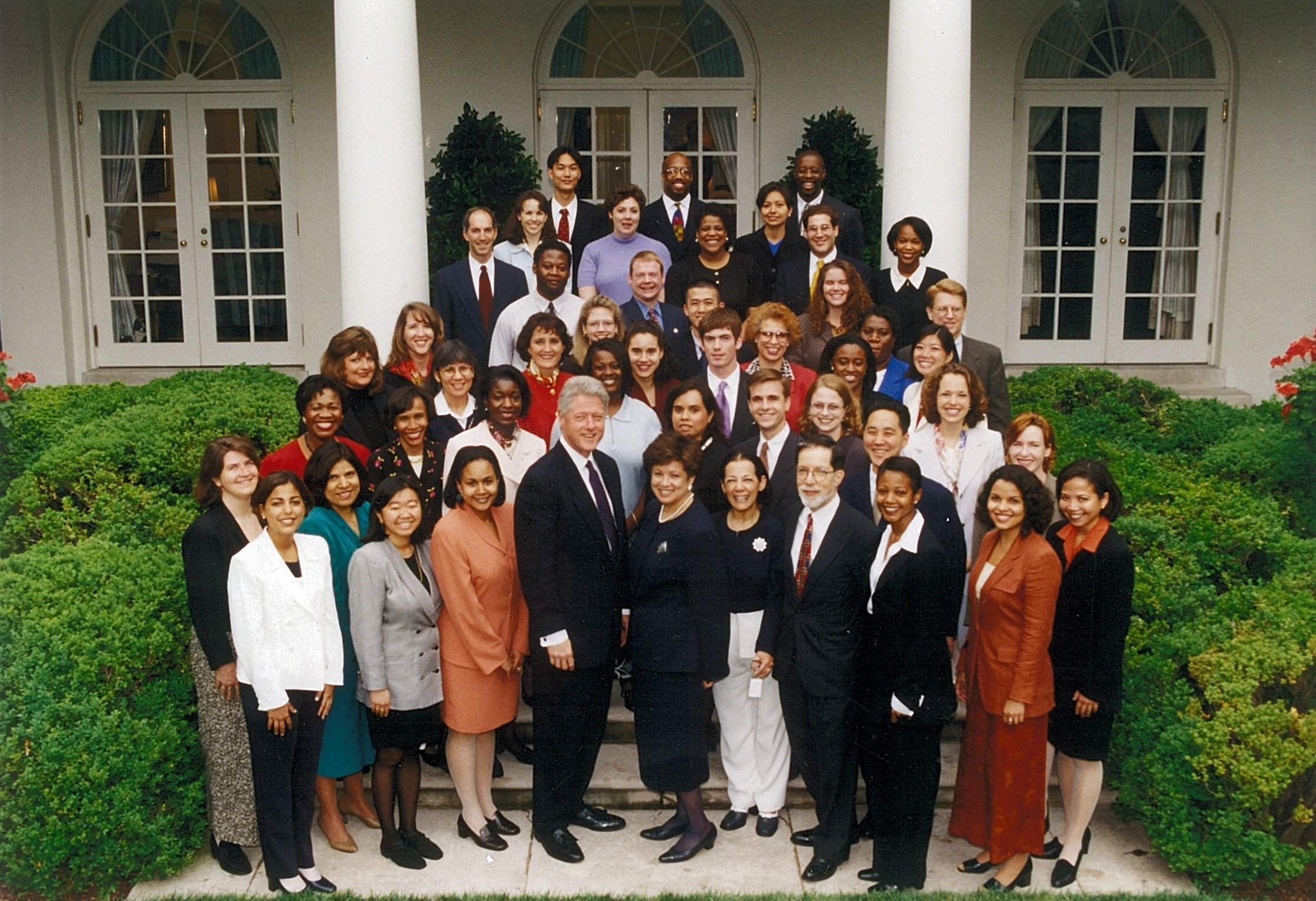
Winston and the Initiative staff in June 1998

Winston has received the prestigious Thurgood Marshall Award from the District of Columbia Bar Association, the Margaret Brent Women Lawyers of Achievement Award from the American Bar Association's Commission on Women in the Profession, and the Lawyer of the Year Award from the Women's Bar Association. She serves on NPR's Board of Directors, Partners for Democratic Change International, the Southern Education Foundation, and the National Law Center on Poverty and Homelessness. She is the author of many articles on education, civil rights, and employment discrimination, and women of color in the workplace.
