= Frozen (advertisement) =

Political advertisement

"Frozen" (also called the "Ballad of Dannie Goeb") was a political advertisement issued by incumbent David Dewhurst's campaign on YouTube during the 2014 primary runoff for Lieutenant Governor of Texas against Dan Patrick. Dewhurst, the three-term lieutenant governor, faced primary challenge from Tea Party favorite Dan Patrick. During the primary, Patrick triggered a runoff between Dewhurst and him by only capturing 41% of the vote.

"Frozen" consisted of an edited version of Patrick, dressed like Elsa, singing a parody of "Let It Go". The lyrics to the parody claim that Patrick changed his name to avoid past debits. Dan Patrick's campaign denied the allegations and release its own Frozen themed advertisement called DewFeed. DewFeed consisted of a webpage with GIFs from Frozen with captions extolling Patrick's conservative virtues and attacking Dewhurst.

== Background ==
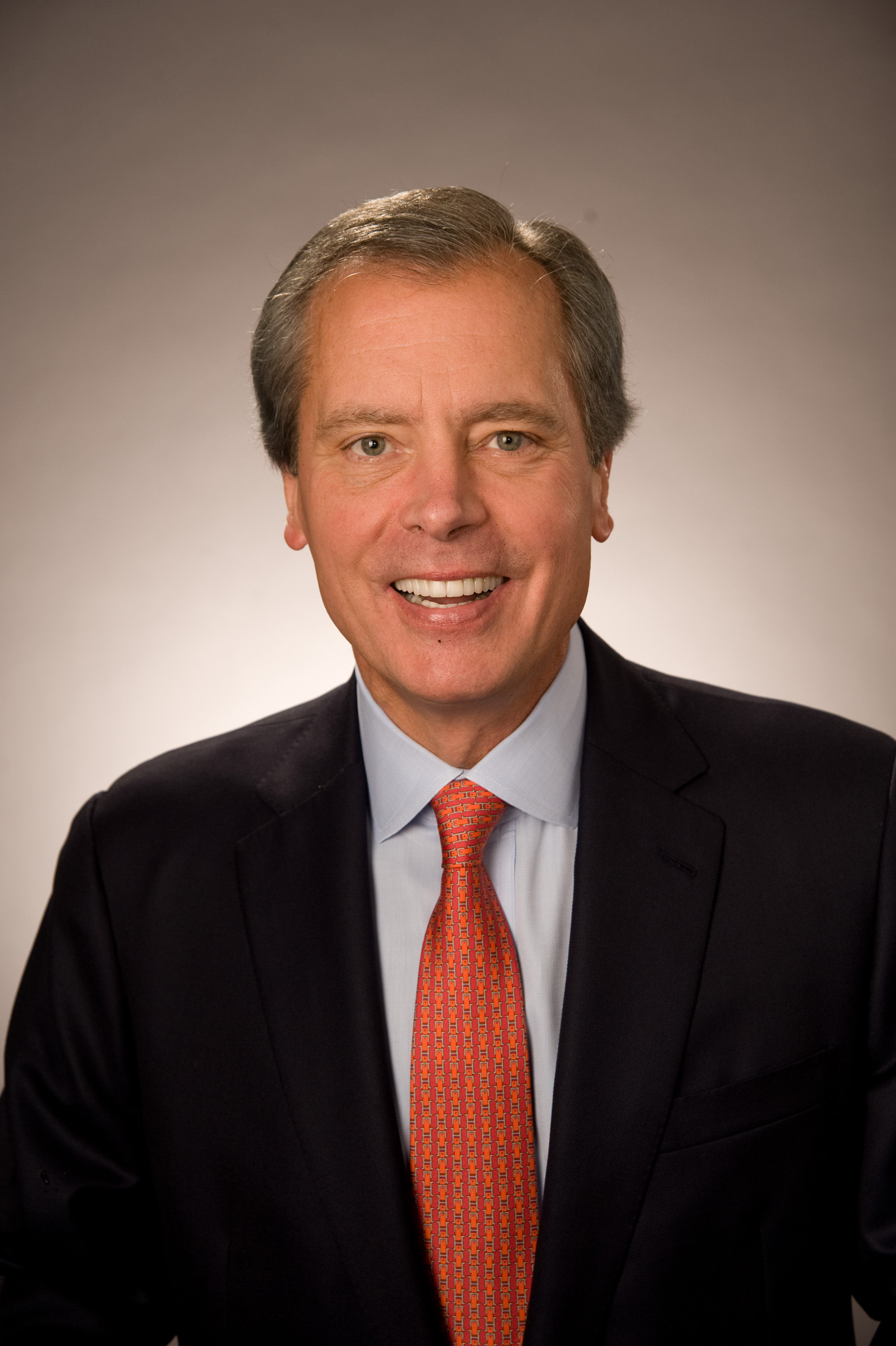
David Dewhurst in 2009

Between 2003 and 2015, David Dewhurst served as the 42nd Lieutenant Governor of Texas. During his three terms as lieutenant governor, Dewhurst helped pass the controversial 2003 Texas redistricting plan as well as "business friendly" legislation. In 2012, Dewhurst ran for the United States Senate and lost in a primary runoff to Ted Cruz.

In 2014, Dewhurst, who was seen as an establishment Republican, faced a primary challenge against a Tea Party-backed candidate, Dan Patrick. In the 2014 Republican primary, Patrick triggered a runoff election by only gathering 41% of the vote; Dewhurst gathered 28% of the vote. During the weeks leading up to the runoff election, Dewhurst ran a negative campaign that included "Frozen" and "Lt. Gov. You've Gotta Love". Dewhurst failed to win the runoff-primary for a fourth term as lieutenant governor.

== Synopsis ==
"Frozen" consists of a roughly animated version of Patrick lip-synching to a parody of "Let It Go". The lyrics to the parody centered around Dewhurst's challenger Dan Patrick. They claim that Patrick changed his name from Dannie Goeb to Dan Patrick to escape scrutiny of a bankruptcy. The first third of the advertisement depicts Patrick, dressed like Elsa, floating in a winter scene. In the second section, Patrick floats around a static image of the Texas State Capitol. In the third section the music is played on top of stock footage of Patrick.

== Reactions ==
=== Dewhurst's campaign ===
David Dewhurst personally did not find "Frozen" entertaining, but released it anyway at the prompting of his younger family members and campaign staff. Dewhurst commented that the advertisement "was not intended to be disrespectful" to Patrick. One Dewhurst staffer referred to "Frozen" as "just like a lighthearted thing."

=== Patrick's campaign ===
In response to the advertisement, Dan Patrick's campaign released a series of GIFs from Frozen on a site called DewFeed, a play off of BuzzFeed. The Patrick campaign used this site to highlight a series of arguments about how he was a better candidate for lieutenant governor. One text and image combination tries to point out that Dewhurst was not concerned about security along the Mexico–United States border until Patrick brought it up in the Senate. In another, Patrick refers to Dewhurst as a "moderate without conservative footing".

In addition to DewFeed, Patrick's campaign pointed out that the allegations that he changed his name to avoid past debit was false. Patrick originally used Dan Patrick when he was a sports broadcaster.
