= 2006 Texas lieutenant gubernatorial election =

- November 7, 2006
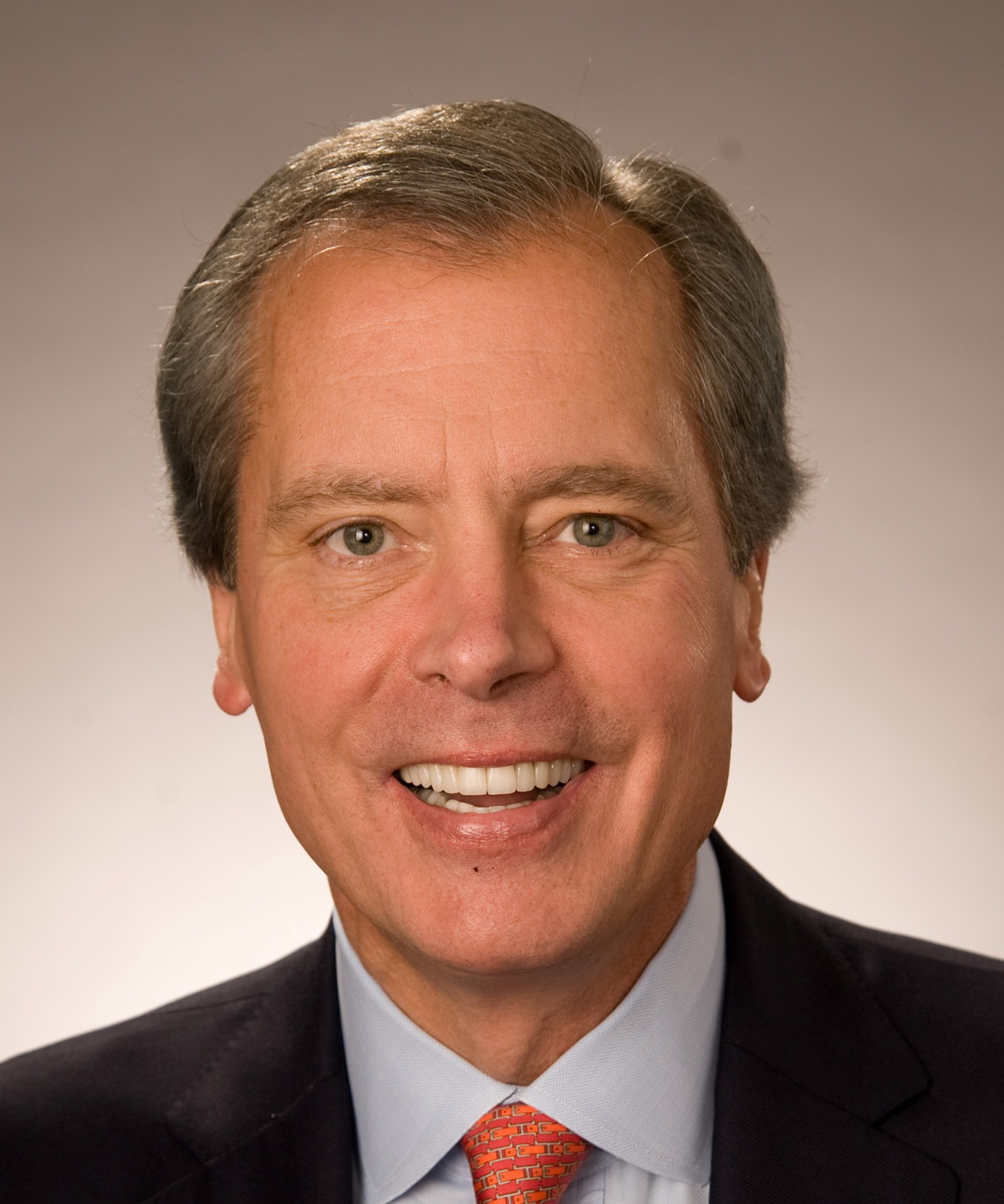

Nominee	David Dewhurst	Maria Luisa Alvarado
Party	Republican	Democratic
Popular vote	2,513,530	1,617,490
Percentage	58.2%	37.5%
- County results Dewhurst: 40–50% 50–60% 60–70% 70–80% 80–90% Alvarado: 40–50% 50–60% 60–70% 70–80% 80–90%
Lieutenant Governor before election
David Dewhurst
Republican
Elected Lieutenant Governor
David Dewhurst
Republican

The 2006 Texas lieutenant gubernatorial election was held on November 7, 2006, to elect the Lieutenant Governor of Texas. The incumbent, Republican David Dewhurst, was reelected in a landslide over Democrat Maria Luisa Alvarado. Dewhurst became the first Republican to be re-elected as lieutenant governor.

== Republican primary ==
=== Candidates ===
Nominee

- David Dewhurst, incumbent Lieutenant Governor of Texas

Eliminated in runoff

- Tom Kelly, perennial candidate

Republican primary results
Party	Candidate	Votes	%
Republican	David Dewhurst (incumbent)	492,052	78.26
Republican	Tom Kelly	136,707	21.74
Total votes		628,759	100.00

== Democratic primary ==
=== Candidates ===
Nominee

- Maria Luisa Alvarado, Texas Air National Guard veteran and research analyst

Eliminated in runoff

- Benjamin Z. Grant, former state representative from the 3rd district (1971-81)

Eliminated in primary

- Adrian De Leon, field technician for the Carrizo Springs water department

Democratic primary results
Party	Candidate	Votes	%
Democratic	Maria Luisa Alvarado	207,835	41.52
Democratic	Benjamin Z. Grant	180,769	36.11
Democratic	Adrian De Leon	112,011	22.37
Total votes		500,615	100.00

=== Runoff ===
Democratic runoff results
Party	Candidate	Votes	%
Democratic	Maria Luisa Alvarado	118,396	57.60
Democratic	Benjamin Z. Grant	87,164	42.40
Total votes		205,560	100.00

== General election ==
General election results
Party	Candidate	Votes	%
Republican	David Dewhurst (incumbent)	2,513,530	58.19
Democratic	Maria Luisa Alvarado	1,617,490	37.45
Libertarian	Judy Baker	188,206	4.36
Total votes		4,319,226	100.00
Republican hold			
