= Bailey's Elementary School for the Arts and Sciences =

Public school in Virginia, US

Bailey's Elementary Magnet School for the Arts and Sciences
- Bailey's Elementary

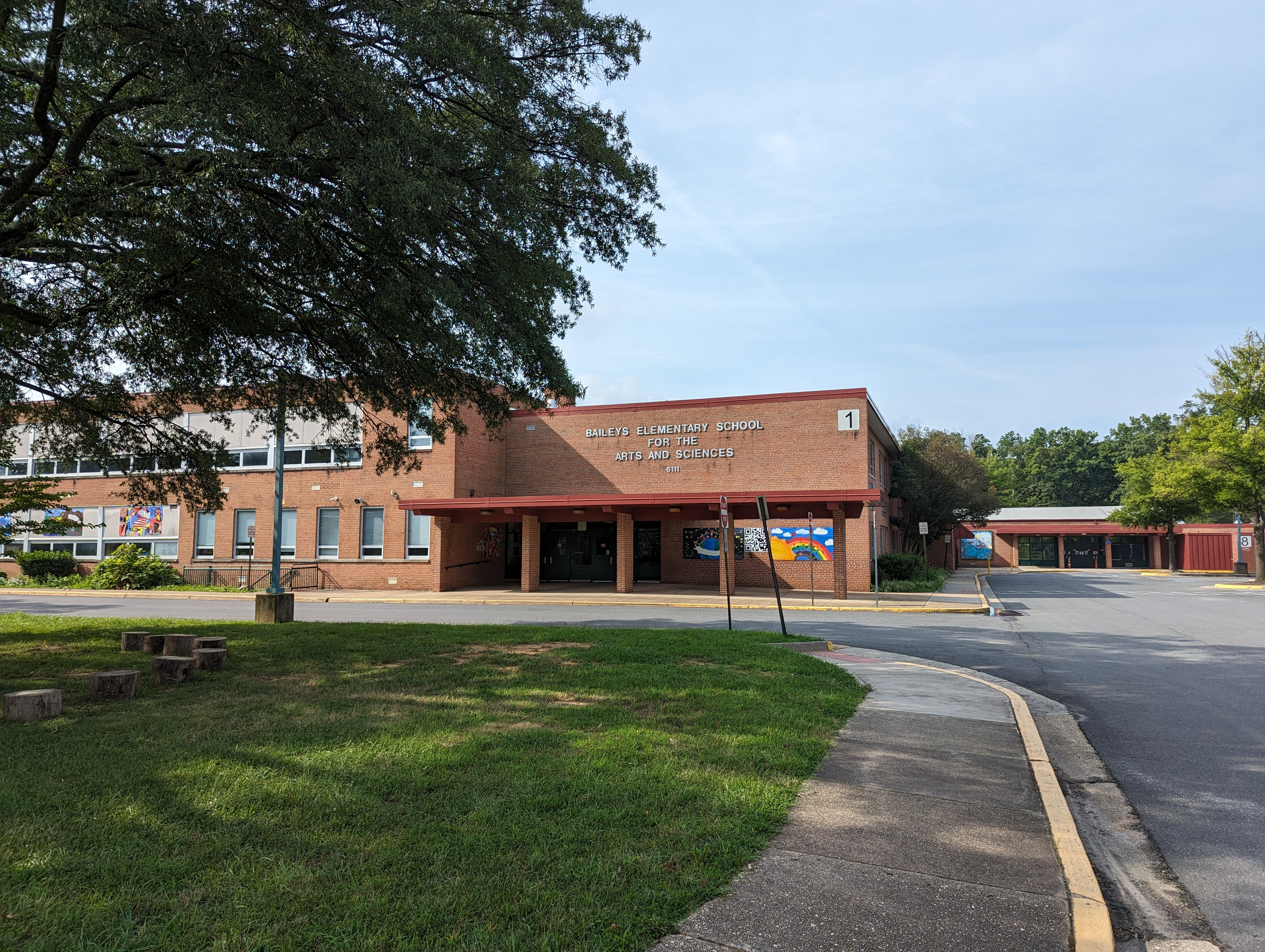

Location
- 6111 Knollwood Dr. Falls Church, Virginia; United States; 38°51′08″N 77°08′45″W

Information
- Type: Public School
- Established: 1952
- Principal: Holly Dowling
- Grades: K-5
- Enrollment: 1,400
- Colours: Orange and Black
- Mascot: Tiger
- Affiliation: Fairfax County Public Schools
- Information: 703.575.6800
- Cluster: 3
- Pyramid: Justice High School
- Website: http://www.fcps.edu/BaileysES/

Bailey's Elementary School for the Arts and Sciences is a public school located in Bailey's Crossroads, Fairfax County, Virginia, United States. The school was founded in 1952 and is part of the Fairfax County Public Schools (FCPS). Bailey's Elementary is a Title I School, and was the first magnet school in Fairfax County. Bailey's is located in the Culmore area and many children from that area attend Bailey's.

In 1997, Bailey's Elementary was selected by President Bill Clinton's One America Initiative Advisory Board on Race as a model for educational excellence in diverse communities.

== History ==
The school opened in 1952.

The magnet program was established in 1991, after Bailey's parent–teacher association (PTA), under President Richard Kurin, threatened to sue the school board to redraw the school boundaries, hoping to bring academic, linguistic, and cultural diversity to a school with a high percentage of non-native English speakers (87% in 1991). To attract students outside of the area, the school's educational program focused on the arts, science, and technology.

In 1997, Bill Clinton's One America Initiative Advisory Board on Race commissioned a case study, "Bailey's Elementary: Educational Strategies for Making Diversity an Asset", calling the school "an educational, social and cultural haven for students from all backgrounds", as quoted by journalist Peter Baker.

Bailey's science teacher Lynn Riggs was selected Teacher of the Year in Fairfax County in 2006.

Under the 2010 FCPS budget cuts, the Magnet transportation buses that brought out-of-boundary Bailey's students to school was proposed for elimination, to save approximately $100,000. The PTA protested that this would lead to a loss of magnet families, which would in turn damage the school's diversity. In April 2009, the FCPS school board decided to maintain the magnet transportation.

A second campus called, Bailey’s Upper, opened for the 2014-15 school year in a converted five-floor office building, to house Grades 3, 4, and 5, and relieve overcrowding at the original building. Bailey’s Upper is located at 6245 Leesburg Pike, Falls Church, 1.4 miles from the original building at 6111 Knollwood Drive, which continues to house grades K-2.

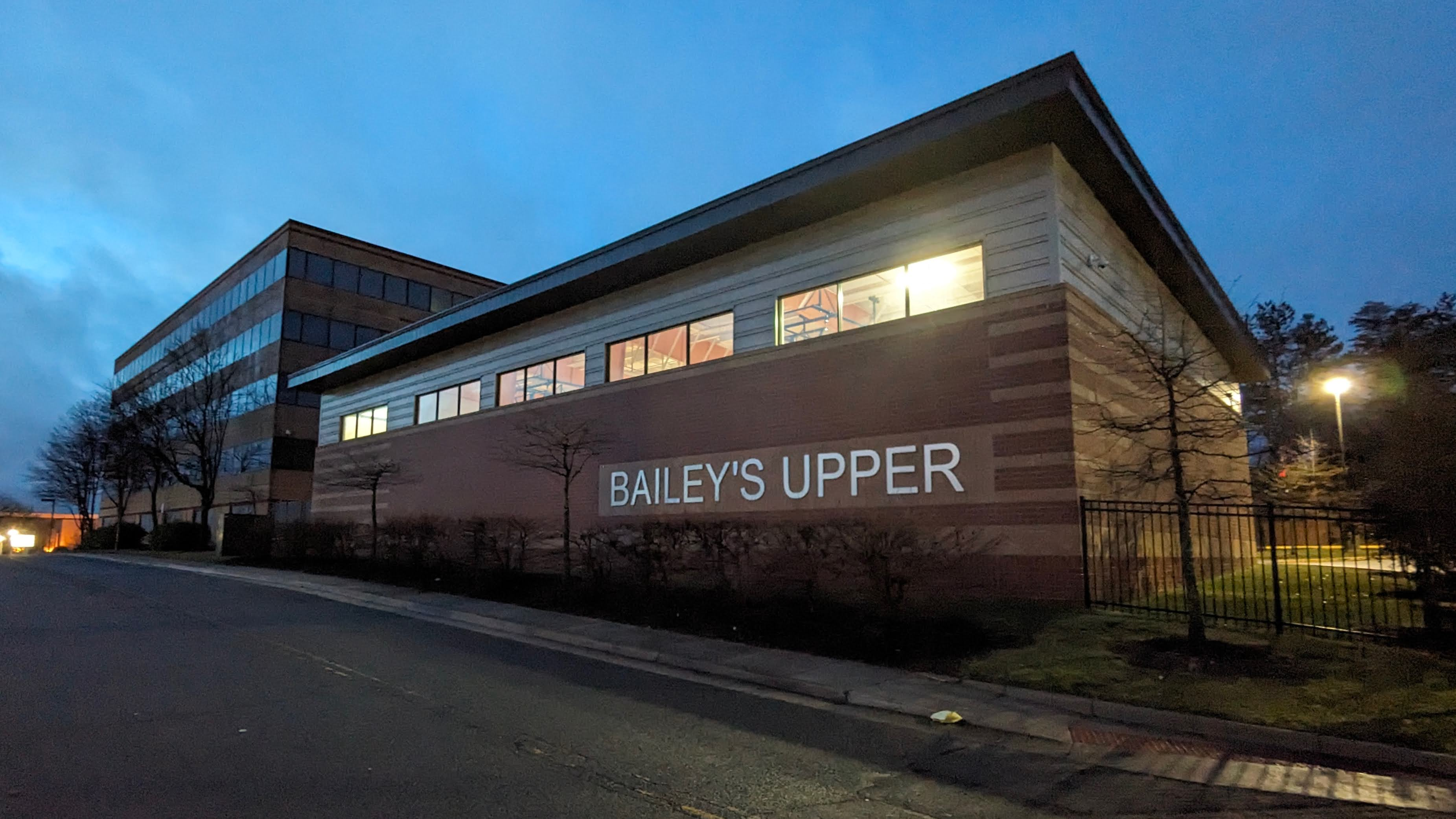
Bailey’s Upper Elementary School, Bailey’s Elementary’s 3-5th grade counterpart

== Educational programs ==
Bailey's Elementary has a partial Spanish immersion program for the math and science curriculum. The school also has a two-way immersion for kindergarten, in which both English- and Spanish-speaking students are taught half of the school day in English and the other half in Spanish.

Bailey's English for Speakers of Other Languages (ESOL) program caters for around 500 students in grades K-5.

In 1999, Bailey's began participating in the Kennedy Center's "Changing Education Through the Arts" (CETA) program, which integrates arts throughout the curriculum. The Kennedy Center provides professional development to the teachers that focuses on arts-integrated instruction. Under the 2010 FCPS Proposed Budget cuts, the CETA program was earmarked for elimination, but was eventually redesigned instead.

The school has an educational partnership with the US Forest Service to teach students about conservation.

Every year local artists help Bailey's students create murals that are displayed on the exterior and interior walls of the school.

Bailey's performing arts include 4th and 5th grade chorus, 4th and 5th grade band, 3rd grade violin, and 4th and 5th grade orchestra. The school also has its own theater, the Black Box Theater.
