= Richard Kurin =

American cultural anthropologist, museum official and author

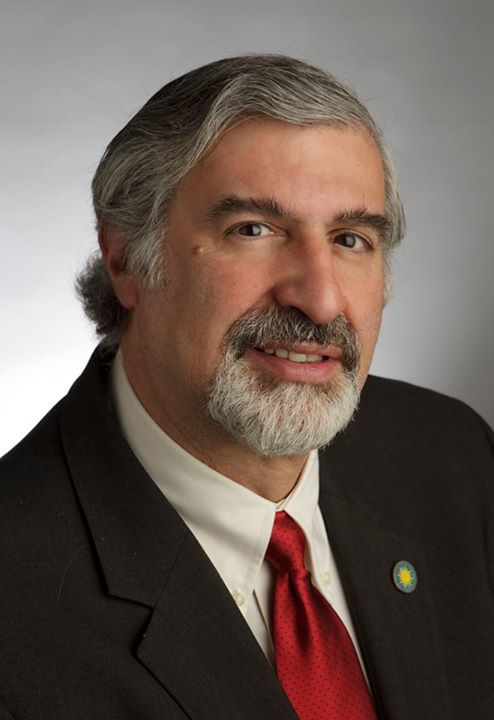
- Richard Kurin, American cultural anthropologist, is Acting Provost and Under Secretary for Museums and Research at the Smithsonian Institution.
- Born: November 27, 1950 (age 75)
- Occupations: Cultural anthropologist, museum official, author
- Employer: Smithsonian Institution
- Known for: Acting Provost and Under Secretary for Museums and Research at the Smithsonian Institution

Richard Kurin (born November 27, 1950), an American cultural anthropologist, museum official and author, is the Acting Provost and Under Secretary for Museums and Research at the Smithsonian Institution. He is a key member of the senior team managing the world's largest museum and research complex with 6,500 employees and a $1.4 billion annual budget, caring for more than 139 million specimens, artifacts and artworks, working in 145 countries around the globe, hosting some 30 million visitors a year, and reaching hundreds of millions online and through the Smithsonian's educational programs and media outreach. Kurin is particularly responsible for all of the national museums, scholarly and scientific research centers, and programs spanning science, history, art and culture.

== Early life and career ==
Kurin was born in New York City, spending his early childhood in the south Bronx before his family moved to Queens. He was an honor student at Bayside High School, lettering in football, and earning a Regents fellowship.

He attended the State University of New York at Buffalo, and traveled to India in 1970, studying a Punjabi village and collecting artifacts for the American Museum of Natural History. He earned a B.A. in anthropology and philosophy in 1972. He then attended the University of Chicago, pursuing graduate study in anthropology and specializing in the study of South Asia. He carried out fieldwork in Pakistan over the course of several years, earning a certificate from the University of California, Berkeley for the study of Urdu and an M.A. in anthropology from the University of Chicago. He was awarded a Fulbright-Hays doctoral dissertation fellowship and a Social Science Research Council fellowship for research in Pakistan. He earned the Ph.D. from the University of Chicago in 1981 for a dissertation entitled Person, Family and Kin in Two Pakistani Communities. In Pakistan he also conducted contract research on indigenous farming practices for Harza Engineering and the World Bank Indus Basin Master Planning Project and taught at the University of Karachi. He served as a visiting assistant professor of community development and then anthropology at Southern Illinois University Carbondale from 1979 to 1984, researching rural America and continuing his studies of Pakistani ethnicity, nationalism, and religious practice with grants from the American Institute of Pakistan Studies and the National Endowment for the Humanities.

== Smithsonian career ==
Kurin worked on contract as a program manager for the Smithsonian's Festival of American Folklife for the U.S. Bicentennial in 1976. He conducted research for the Smithsonian in India and Pakistan from the late 1970s through the mid-1980s, and served as the program manager for the Smithsonian's Festival of India in 1984–85. He worked closely with Smithsonian Secretary S. Dillon Ripley, Ralph Rinzler and Jeffrey Lariche and Indian designer Rajeev Sethi in organizing Aditi: A Celebration of Life, a major exhibition of the traditional Indian life cycle that included scores of musicians and artisans in the National Museum of Natural History, and curating Mela: An Indian Fair for the Festival of American Folklife outdoors on the National Mall in Washington, D.C. He became deputy director of the Smithsonian's Office of Folklife Programs in 1985, then its acting director in 1988.

In 1990 he was appointed director of the Center for Folklife and Cultural Heritage by Secretary Robert McCormack Adams, a position he held until 2009. As director, he was responsible for the Smithsonian Folklife Festival on the National Mall, Smithsonian Folkways Recordings, and other cultural educational programs. Kurin, working with festival director Diana Parker and Center deputy director Richard Kennedy, arranged for dozens of programs at the festival, among the highlights a program on Massachusetts in 1988, Hawaii in 1989, White House workers, Maroon and New Mexico programs in 1992, Iowa in 1996, Wisconsin in 1998, the Mississippi Delta in 1999, Tibetan culture with the Dalai Lama in 2000, New York City in 2001, and the Silk Road with Yo-Yo Ma and more than 500 other artists from 28 countries in 2002 supported by funds from the Aga Khan Trust for Culture. He worked closely with Samuel Sidibe of Mali for the 2003 Festival; Haitian colleagues Geri Benoit, Patrick Delatour, Patrick Villaire and Olsen Jean Julian from Haiti for the 2004 Festival; cultural leaders in Northern Ireland in 2007; and Jigme Thinley, who became the first Prime Minister of Bhutan, for the 2008 Festival.

In 1987 Kurin worked with Ralph Rinzler on the acquisition of Folkways from Moses Asch and family. This included the production of a benefit album to raise funds for the acquisition. The album Folkways: A Vision Shared featured Bob Dylan, Bruce Springsteen, U2 and others. Produced by Columbia Records with Don Devito and Harold Levanthal, it won a Grammy Award for best traditional folk album.

Kurin worked with fellow anthropologist Tony Seeger as the first director of Smithsonian Folkways Recordings and enlisted Grateful Dead drummer and musicologist Mickey Hart to re-engineer the collection. Smithsonian Folkways went on to produce more than a dozen Grammy winning and nominated albums, including the Anthology of American Folk Song in 1997.

He garnered grants from the Rockefeller Foundation and the Paul Allen Foundation with John Kertzer to start Smithsonian Global Sounds, a digital music archive and distribution service.

Kurin continued to work with musicians like Yo-Yo Ma and Mickey Hart on other several other recording and educational projects.

Dorothy Height, the president of the National Council of Negro Women, enlisted Kurin to help organize the production of the first National Black Family Reunion on the National Mall in 1986. Aid continued for over two decades.

Kurin produced many of the Smithsonian's major public programs on the National Mall, such as the Smithsonian's Birthday Party in 1996, the National World War II Reunion for the opening of the National World War II Memorial, and the opening of the National Museum of the American Indian, both in 2004. Kurin produced public programs for Presidential Inaugurals in 1993, 1997, 2005, 2009, and 2013. He worked with the Atlanta Committee for the Olympic Games to produce a cultural festival in Centennial Park during the games in 1996, and with the White House to produce public programs for the celebration of the Millennium at the end of 1999.

Kurin was awarded the Smithsonian Secretary's Gold Medal for Exceptional Service in 1996.

Kurin, with support from the U.S. Department of State, was appointed by the Director-General of UNESCO to a distinguished international jury for the Masterpieces of Oral and Intangible Heritage program in 1999. In the same year, Kurin organized an international conference on Safeguarding Traditional Cultures with UNESCO at the Smithsonian. Kurin advised the U.S. Department of State on the development of an international treaty concerning traditional cultural heritage, and participated in an international experts group to help draft the Convention for the Safeguarding of Intangible Cultural Heritage which was approved by UNESCO in 2003 and has been ratified by more than 160 nations. Kurin led Smithsonian efforts to make the institution a Rockefeller Foundation Humanities Fellowship program site for three years for a project on theorizing cultural heritage. Kurin was appointed by Secretary of State Colin Powell to the U.S. Commission for UNESCO in 2005 and reappointed by Secretary of State Condoleezza Rice in 2006. Kurin serves as the Smithsonian liaison to the White House Historical Association and the President's Committee for the Arts and the Humanities.

While director of the Smithsonian Center for Folklife and Cultural Heritage, Kurin was appointed chair of the Smithsonian's 150th anniversary program committee by Secretary I. Michael Heyman. In 2004, Kurin was appointed acting director of Smithsonian National Programs by Secretary Lawrence Small, and two years later, director, overseeing the Smithsonian Institution Traveling Exhibition Service, The Smithsonian Associates, Smithsonian Affiliates and other educational programs as well as the programmatic aspects of the Smithsonian Channel, a cable television partnership with Showtime. In 2007, acting Secretary Cristian Samper appointed Kurin the Smithsonian's acting Under Secretary for History and Culture, responsible for oversight of the National Museum of American History, National Museum of the American Indian, National Museum of African American History and Culture, National Postal Museum, Anacostia Community Museum, Center for Folklife and Cultural Heritage, Smithsonian Latino Center and Asian Pacific American Program. Several months later, art was added to Kurin's portfolio as he took on oversight of the Smithsonian American Art Museum, National Portrait Gallery, Freer and Sackler Galleries of Art, Hirshhorn Museum & Sculpture Garden, Cooper-Hewitt National Design Museum, National Museum of African Art, and Archives of American Art. In 2009, Secretary G. Wayne Clough made the appointment permanent. In addition to overseeing museums and programs, Kurin shares responsibilities for the Smithsonian's Libraries, Archives, Fellowships, Collections and International Programs with the Under Secretary for Science. In 2009, Kurin organized the Smithsonian 2.0 conference, pairing Smithsonian staff with leaders in web and digital media from academic, educational and business worlds.

In 2010, Kurin founded and organized the Haiti Cultural Recovery Project with the U.S. President's Committee for the Arts and the Humanities and other cultural organizations to help save that nation's heritage after the devastating earthquake. Funded by U.S.AID, The Broadway League, and other sponsors, the project sent more than 80 conservators to Haiti, trained more than 150 Haitians and saved some 35,000 artworks, artifacts, murals, sculptures, rare books and archives. Kurin later joined with colleagues to develop and support an advanced internship for Haitian conservators at Yale University, and with the Ben Stiller Foundation to establish and build a Cultural Conservation Center at Quisqueya University in Port-au-Prince in 2015. With Cultural Preservation Officer Cori Wegener, Kurin led Smithsonian efforts to save cultural heritage endangered by terrorism in Mali, Egypt, Iraq and Syria, and that threatened by natural disaster in the wake of Superstorm Sandy in New York and the 2015 earthquake in Nepal.

In 2015, David Skorton became Secretary of the Smithsonian and with the approval of the Board of Regents, the White House, and then Congress in 2016, reorganized its senior management, instituting the position of Provost. Kurin was appointed Acting Provost and Under Secretary for Museums, continuing to oversee all of the History, Art, and Culture museums and programs, but subsuming those formerly overseen by the Under Secretary for Science. Kurin became responsible for the National Air and Space Museum and its Stephen-Udvar Hazy Center, National Museum of Natural History, National Zoological Park and its Smithsonian Conservation Biology Institute, Smithsonian Astrophysical Observatory, Smithsonian Environmental Research Center, and Smithsonian Tropical Research Institute. He also assumed oversight of the Office of Fellowships & Internships, Museum Conservation Institute, National Collections Program, Smithsonian Institution Archives, Smithsonian Institution Libraries, and Smithsonian Scholarly Press.

== Other roles ==
Kurin served as a professorial lecturer at the Johns Hopkins University Paul H. Nitze School of Advanced International Studies in Washington, D.C., from 1985 to 1994. He has authored more than a hundred scholarly articles and chapters and given hundreds of presentations at universities and museums around the U.S. and across the globe, and his work featured in scores of radio and television programs. His articles on ethnographic fieldwork, "Doctor, Lawyer, Indian Chief," museology and intangible cultural heritage have been often reproduced and widely cited. He was awarded the Benjamin A. Botkin Prize in 1999 for lifetime achievement in public sector folklore by the American Folklore Society.[29] He was a keynote speaker at the 2004 meeting of the International Council of Museums in Seoul, Korea and in 2007 gave the Founder's Lecture at Harvard University's Peabody Museum. He was awarded the Robert Mills Medal for his scholarship by the Commission for the Smithsonian American Art Museum. In 2014 he gave the distinguished lecture for the General Anthropology Division at the meetings of the American Anthropology Association.

In 2015 Kurin was elected to the American Academy of Arts and Sciences.

Kurin has organized and led three Smithsonian Journeys Around the World cultural expeditions in 2008, 2009, and 2013.

Kurin, served as the PTA President of Bailey's Elementary School in the early 1990s had helped establish it as a center for arts and sciences, the first elementary school magnet program in the Fairfax County Public Schools.

Kurin serves on the Visiting Committee of the Social Sciences at the University of Chicago and was a member of the Dean's Advisory Council at the University at Buffalo from 2004 to 2013 and an alumni recipient of the Dean's Award.

== Published books ==
Kurin has published scores of scholarly articles on cultural representation, intangible cultural heritage, the sociology and arts of India and Pakistan. His books have reached both popular and specialized audiences. The Smithsonian's History of American in 101 Objects has been on a number of best-seller lists. It also resulted in a four-part documentary series on the Smithsonian Channel, Seriously Amazing Objects, a 24-part Telly Award-winning lecture series with The Great Courses entitled "Experiencing America: A Smithsonian Tour through American History," and a MOOC on edX "Objects That Define America." His book on the Hope Diamond inspired a Smithsonian Channel documentary Mystery of the Hope Diamond; his work on Haiti resulted in the Smithsonian Channel documentary Haiti's Treasures: Out of the Rubble.

- Reflections of a Culture Broker: A View from the Smithsonian (Washington: Smithsonian Institution Press, 1997)
- Smithsonian Folklife Festival: Culture Of, By, and For the People (Washington: Smithsonian, 1998)
- Hope Diamond: The Legendary History of a Cursed Gem (New York: HarperCollins/Smithsonian Books, 2006)
- Saving Haiti's Culture: Cultural Recovery After the Earthquake (Washington: Smithsonian, 2011)
- Madcap May: Mistress of Myth, Men and Hope (Washington: Smithsonian Books, 2012)
- The Smithsonian's History of America in 101 Objects (New York: Penguin Press, 2013)
- History by a Hair: Thomas Jefferson, Sally Hemings & Solving a 200-Year-Old Mystery (New York: Crown, 2026)
