= David Dewhurst =

American politician (born 1945)

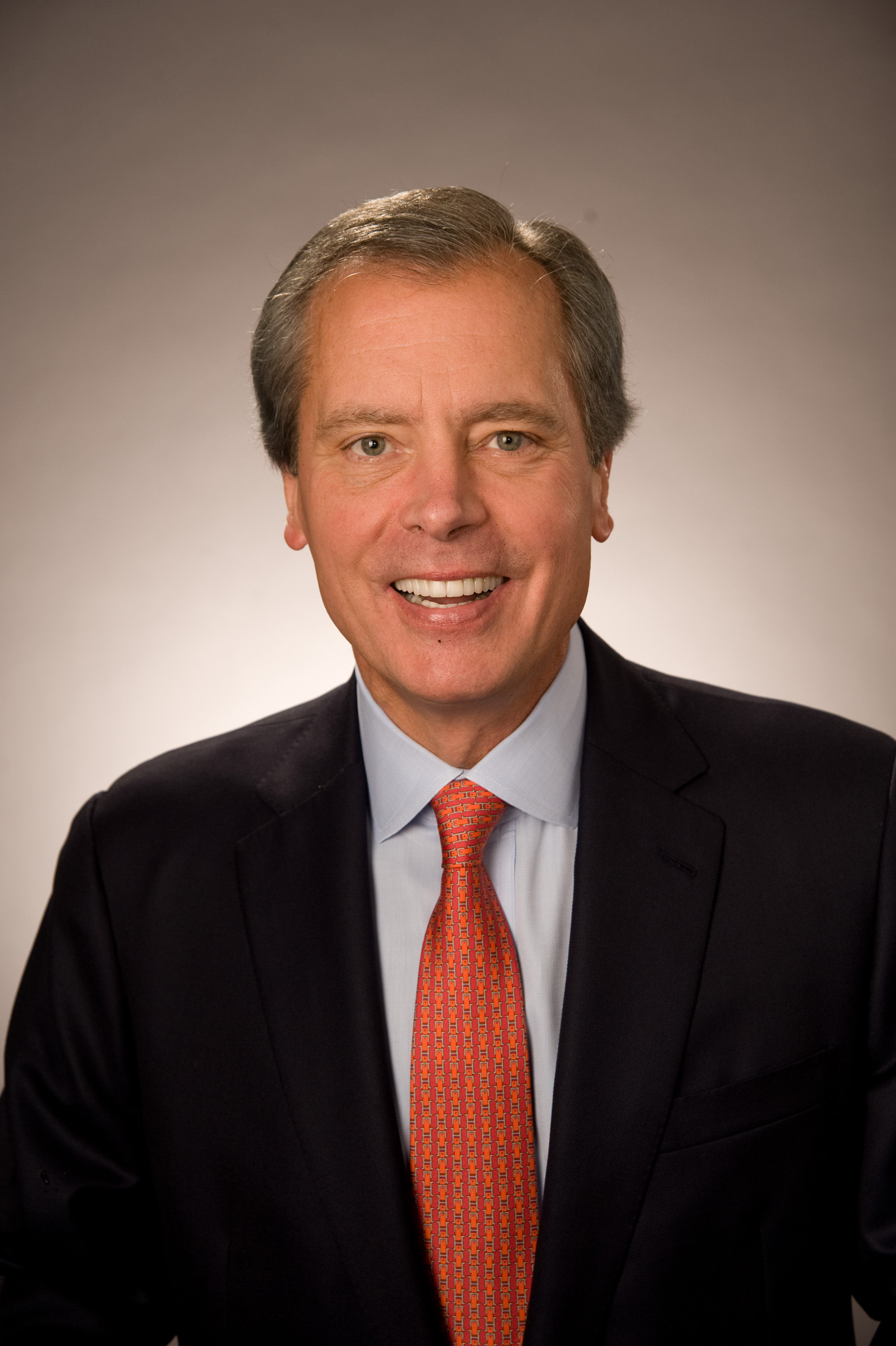

41st Lieutenant Governor of Texas
- In office January 21, 2003 – January 20, 2015
- Governor: Rick Perry
- Preceded by: Bill Ratliff
- Succeeded by: Dan Patrick

26th Land Commissioner of Texas
- In office January 19, 1999 – January 21, 2003
- Governor: George W. Bush; Rick Perry
- Preceded by: Garry Mauro
- Succeeded by: Jerry Patterson

Personal details
- Born: David Henry Dewhurst; August 18, 1945 (age 81) Houston, Texas, U.S.
- Party: Republican
- Spouse(s): Tammy Jo Hopkins (m. 1995; div. 2000) Patricia Hamilton Bivins (m. 2009; div. 2016)
- Children: 1 daughter
- Education: University of Arizona (BA)

Military service
- Allegiance: United States
- Branch/service: United States Air Force
- Years of service: 1967–1970
- Rank: First lieutenant
- Unit: 1040th U.S. Air Force Field Activity Squadron

David Henry Dewhurst (born August 18, 1945) is an American politician, businessman, and attorney who served as the 41st lieutenant governor of Texas from 2003 to 2015. A member of the Republican Party, he was the Texas Land Commissioner from 1999 to 2003. He was a candidate in 2012 for the U.S. Senate seat vacated by the retiring Republican Kay Bailey Hutchison, but he lost his party's runoff election to former Solicitor General Ted Cruz, who went on to win the general election. Dewhurst ran for a fourth term as Lieutenant Governor in 2014, but lost renomination to then-state senator Dan Patrick in the Republican primary.

Dewhurst's third term as lieutenant governor ended on January 20, 2015. He served as an advisory board member at the United States Secretary of Energy led by former Governor Rick Perry who was appointed by President Donald Trump in 2017.

== Personal life ==
Dewhurst's father, David Dewhurst Jr., was a World War II pilot of a Martin B-26 Marauder of the 553d Fighter-Bomber Squadron. On D-Day, flying over Cotentin Peninsula in the "Dinah Might", he led a squadron bombing German positions on Utah Beach. After the war, David Dewhurst Jr. was killed by a drunk driver, leaving behind his wife and his two sons, David and Eugene.

Both brothers visited the Utah Beach Museum on June 7, 2007, and discovered an exhibit detailing their father's mission on D-Day. Moved, the Dewhurst brothers contributed millions of dollars for the extension of the museum, allowing it to purchase a B-26 Marauder and to open a new building.

Dewhurst is a businessman, a rancher, and a community leader in Houston, where he has served on civic and charitable boards. He graduated from Lamar High School in Houston and earned his bachelor's degree and played basketball at the University of Arizona in Tucson, Arizona, where he was a brother of the Beta Theta Pi fraternity. There he received a BA in English with a minor in history.

Lacking the eyesight to become a pilot like his father, Dewhurst became an intelligence officer in the U.S. Air Force and then an officer of the Central Intelligence Agency, and the United States State Department. During his years in the CIA, Dewhurst was stationed in Bolivia, arriving shortly before the coup against leftist president Juan José Torres.

In 1981, Dewhurst and Ted Law re-established Falcon Seaboard, a Texas-based diversified energy and investments company in Houston that Law had founded in 1935. The company quickly made Dewhurst a millionaire, but collapsed just as quickly, going into bankruptcy. Dewhurst then went into business constructing cogeneration plants, which proved to be a tremendous success. In 1996, the company sold its plants for $226 million, and in 2011, Dewhurst was worth an estimated $200 million.

In 1995, Dewhurst married Tammy Jo Hopkins, a 32-year-old model. After she pled no contest to driving while intoxicated in 1999, the couple announced that she would seek full-time help for alcohol abuse. The couple divorced in 2000.

In April 2021, Dewhurst was arrested on charges of domestic violence at a Dallas hotel. The arrest record said Dewhurst was trying to board a bus back to Houston when he realized his girlfriend, Leslie Caron, 41, had taken his laptop. She ran with it and he chased her onto a patio area near the hotel entrance trying to retrieve his laptop computer, when she fell over a concrete bench. In May 2021, the Dallas County District Attorney's Office declined to accept a domestic violence case against the former lieutenant governor, and no further action was taken.

He breeds registered Black Angus cattle and once competed in National Cutting Horse Association competitions. He also speaks Spanish.

== Political career ==
=== Land Commissioner ===
Dewhurst was elected as Commissioner of the General Land Office of Texas in 1998, when the 16-year incumbent, Garry Mauro, waged an unsuccessful campaign for governor against George W. Bush. Dewhurst was opposed in the general election by Democratic State Representative Richard Raymond, then of Benavides and thereafter of Laredo. Dewhurst described himself as a "George Bush Republican" and drew on his personal wealth to spend a record $8 million on his run for office (previous candidates for land commissioner had generally spent only $1 million). The campaign was a bitter one, in which Dewhurst's Republican primary opponent, Jerry E. Patterson, accused Dewhurst of trying to bribe him to leave the race, and Raymond unsuccessfully accused him of embezzlement. Dewhurst ultimately received 2,072,604 votes (57.42 percent) to Raymond's 1,438,378 ballots (39.85 percent). Dewhurst was the first Republican to serve as Land Commissioner since the Reconstruction era.

=== Lieutenant governor ===
==== 2002 election ====
Dewhurst was elected lieutenant governor in November 2002, when he defeated former Democratic Comptroller John Sharp of Victoria, now the chancellor of Texas A&M University. In that campaign, Dewhurst stressed his interest in public education and opposition to school vouchers. He again outspent his opponent significantly with a $9 million campaign. Dewhurst polled 2,341,875 votes (51.77 percent) to Sharp's 2,082,281 (46.03 percent).

Dewhurst succeeded Bill Ratliff. (Ratliff did not contest the lieutenant governor's position in the primary, opting instead for re-election to his state senate seat.)

Summarizing Dewhurst's first term, The New York Times wrote, "Amid low expectations, Mr. Dewhurst surprised many that first session, helping to steer a major tort-reform package and cutting the budget while earning the respect of his colleagues as a burgeoning team player." However, the paper also noted that he "frequently frustrated senators from both parties for not appearing to hold firm in negotiations with the House or with [Gov. Rick] Perry."

==== 2006 election ====
Dewhurst was renominated for lieutenant governor in the Republican primary held on March 7, 2006. He defeated Tom Kelly, the same candidate whom he bested for the nomination in 2002. In the November 7, 2006, general election, Dewhurst overwhelmed Democrat Maria Luisa Alvarado, a veterans issues research analyst and the winner of her April 11 runoff primary. He received 2,512,197 votes (58.2 percent) to Alvarado's 1,616,945 (37.4 percent). Libertarian Judy A. Baker polled another 188,956 votes (4.4 percent).

==== 2010 election ====
Dewhurst filed for Lt. Governor of Texas in the 2010 election. It was widely assumed that he would run for United States Senate if Kay Bailey Hutchison had resigned. He was his party's nominee for a third term as lieutenant governor and faced Democrat Linda Chavez-Thompson, Libertarian Scott Jameson, and Green Party Herb Gonzales, Jr. in the November 2, 2010, general election. He was re-elected to a third term on November 2, 2010, having polled 3,044,770 votes (61.80 percent) to the Democrat Linda Chavez-Thompson's 1,715,735 votes (34.82 percent) and took office on January 18, 2011, for a third four-year term, becoming the second Texas Lieutenant Governor to be elected to three four-year terms since Bill Hobby, who held the office for 18 years for five terms.

==== 2014 election ====
Dewhurst and Patrick faced each other in the May 27 runoff election for lieutenant governor. The winner would eventually run in the general election against Democratic State Senator Leticia Van de Putte of San Antonio, who was the Democratic nominee for the lieutenant governorship. During the runoff, Dewhurst released a disco-themed advertisement Lt. Gov. You've Gotta Love and a parody of Let It Go from the Disney film Frozen. On May 27, 2014, Patrick easily defeated Dewhurst in a landslide: 65% to 35%.

Patrick said after state Senator Wendy Davis of Fort Worth (who was the Democratic nominee for governor) filibustered the bill to ban late-term abortions in Texas that Dewhurst has "lost his grip on the reins of the Senate". Patrick called for new leadership in the chamber.

Polling by the University of Texas at Austin and The Texas Tribune showed Dewhurst leading his opponents in the primary with 26 percent of the vote, to Patrick's 13 percent, Patterson's 10 percent and Staples' 5 percent. At the time, 46 percent of voters were reported as undecided.

=== Legislation ===
==== Childhood legislation ====
He is known by his "Texas Children First" initiative with more severe consequences for child sexual predators in Texas and throughout the United States. The initiative includes extending statute of limitations on child sex crimes and leading the passage of Jessica's Law. The bill was signed into law by Texas Governor Rick Perry but the death penalty for second-time child rapists was struck down by the U.S. Supreme Court.

==== TSA inspection bill ====
Dewhurst was accused by state senator Dan Patrick of helping to stop a bill, the passage of which would have been an attempt to make the pat downs of airplane passengers by personnel of the U.S. Transportation Security Agency (TSA) a felony in Texas.

=== Controversies ===
==== Condemnation of school stage play ====
In March 2010, a student performance of the play Corpus Christi by Terrence McNally, in which Jesus and the disciples are portrayed as being gay, was canceled at Tarleton State University in Stephenville, Texas following a condemnatory statement by Dewhurst. The university had received many complaints about the play's scheduled performance as a class project for a directing class, but in a letter posted on the university's website on March 11, President F. Dominic Dottavio, citing freedom of speech, declared that the play would be performed. The day before the performance, Dewhurst issued his statement saying, "No one should have the right to use government funds or institutions to portray acts that are morally reprehensible to the vast majority of Americans," and the performance was cancelled by the professor, who cited safety concerns. A subsequent statement by Dewhurst praised the university for canceling the performance, whereas the professor claimed to have acted on his own. Dewhurst's statement also claimed that whereas he is "a strong defender of free speech, we must also protect the rights and reasonable expectations of Texas taxpayers and how their money is used. A play that is completely contrary to the standards of decency and moral beliefs of the vast majority of Texans should not be performed using any state resources, especially by an institution of higher learning."

==== Calling Allen, Texas police regarding jailed relative ====
In an August 3, 2013, recording, originally released by police to the Dallas-Fort Worth NBC affiliate, NBC-DFW, Dewhurst identifies himself as the lieutenant governor and asks to speak to the police station's "most senior police officer you have where you are right now". He tells a police sergeant that Ellen Bevers, his stepsister's daughter-in-law, is a schoolteacher and "the sweetest woman in the world", and says he's sure she has been incarcerated on a "mistaken charge".

== 2012 United States Senate race ==
On July 18, 2011, Dewhurst addressed his supporters in an online video on his campaign website, announcing his candidacy for the vacant U.S. Senate seat for the Republican nomination. His rivals included former Mayor of Dallas Tom Leppert, ESPN college football analyst Craig James and former state Solicitor General Ted Cruz, the eventual nominee.

After a year-long campaign for the Republican nomination, Dewhurst lost to Cruz in a run-off on July 31, 2012. Cruz then won the seat in the general election against Democrat Paul Sadler of Henderson.

Party political offices
Preceded by Marta Greytok	Republican nominee for Land Commissioner of Texas; 1998	Succeeded by Jerry E. Patterson
Preceded by Rick Perry	Republican nominee for Lieutenant Governor of Texas; 2002, 2006, 2010	Succeeded by Dan Patrick
Political offices
Preceded by Garry Mauro	Texas Land Commissioner; 1999–2003	Succeeded by James Patterson
Preceded by Bill Ratliff	Lieutenant Governor of Texas; 2003–2015	Succeeded by Dan Patrick
