= Arlene Holt Baker =

American trade union activist and labor leader

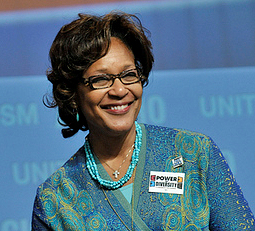
- Arlene Holt Baker after speaking at the AFL-CIO Quadrennial Convention in Pittsburgh, Pennsylvania, on September 16, 2009.
- Born: 1951 (age 74–75); Fort Worth, Texas
- Occupations: Union organizer, Labor activist
- Known for: Executive Vice President, AFL-CIO

Arlene Holt Baker (born 1951) is an American trade union activist and labor leader. A staff assistant with the AFL-CIO since 1995, she was appointed executive vice-president of the labor federation by the AFL-CIO Executive Council in 2007 and won re-election in 2009. She became the first African American in the federation's history to serve as an officer.

== Early life and union career ==
Holt Baker was born in 1951 in Fort Worth, Texas. Her father, W.S. Leslie, was a laborer and her mother, Louise Leslie, was a domestic worker. She was one of seven children.

Holt Baker became an organizer with American Federation of State, County and Municipal Employees (AFSCME) in the late 1980s. She began organizing public sector employees for the state of California, and eventually was hired as an international union staff representative. She rose to become an "area director" in California, overseeing AFSCME's collective bargaining efforts for public employee locals and leading the union's political operations for statewide and federal races.

== AFL-CIO career ==
In 1995, John Sweeney was elected president of the AFL-CIO, unseating incumbent Thomas R. Donahue. Sweeney's running mate, Linda Chavez-Thompson, was elected the labor federation's executive vice-president. Chavez-Thompson, a local AFSCME leader from Texas, hired Holt Baker as her executive assistant.

Holt Baker was given a number of assignments in addition to her duties as an executive assistant to Chavez-Thompson. In 1998, she led the AFL-CIO's successful effort to defeat California Proposition 226, which would have denied dues check-off to public employees belonging to unions and required all union members in the state to annually give their assent before any portion of their dues could be used for political purposes.

Holt Baker's success in leading this campaign caused her to be named an executive assistant to AFL-CIO president John Sweeney in 1999. She held this position until her appointment as executive vice-president. Among her duties as assistant to Sweeney was her role as AFL-CIO liaison to religious groups. Holt Baker's primary duty as Sweeney's assistant, however, was as director of the AFL-CIO's Voice@Work campaign. A precursor effort to American Rights at Work and Working America, the Voice@Work project was designed to build community support for union organizing efforts.

As a top aide to Sweeney, Holt Baker was repeatedly tapped to head up AFL-CIO political efforts. In 2000, she led a coalition of labor unions which registered voters and mobilized supporters in Pennsylvania, an important electoral battleground for unions. Labor's efforts in Pennsylvania were cited as critical to winning the state for the Democratic column. Holt Baker led the same coalition a second time in 2002, helping Ed Rendell win the gubernatorial election.

Holt Baker's political work for the AFL-CIO continued in 2003. She was named president of the Working America Alliance, a 527 group established by a coalition of AFL-CIO member unions. Later that year, she became president of Voices For Working Families (VFWF), another 527 group which eventually became the 14th largest fundraiser among all 527s that year. Holt Baker's work for Voices for Working Families was so successful that the Republican Party filed a complaint against VFWF and 13 other 527 groups with the Federal Election Commission. The complaint, which was eventually dismissed, alleged that VFWF and the other 527s were illegally coordinating their electoral efforts with John Kerry's presidential campaign.

Sweeney named Holt Baker manager of his (successful) 2005 campaign for re-election as president of the AFL-CIO.

In 2005 and 2006, Holt Baker led the AFL-CIO's Hurricane Katrina recovery response in Louisiana and Mississippi. She coordinated disaster relief in the first few months after the natural disaster, and then oversaw AFL-CIO investment and building programs in the region.

== AFL-CIO election ==
On September 11, 2007, Chavez-Thompson announced she would retire from her post as AFL-CIO executive vice-president on September 21, 2007. AFL-CIO President John Sweeney immediately announced that he intended to have the federation executive council approve Holt Baker to fill the remainder of Chavez-Thompson's unexpired term. At its regularly scheduled meeting 10 days later, the AFL-CIO Executive Council unanimously voted to approve Arlene Holt Baker as AFL-CIO executive vice-president. Her term expired in 2009.

At least one prominent labor commentator sharply criticized Holt Baker's elevation. Longtime union democracy activist Harry Kelber has argued that Chavez-Thompson should not have resigned immediately, but rather given the Executive Council several months' notice so that additional candidates could be recruited and/or their qualifications considered; that the timing of Chavez-Thompson's retirement gave only a few days' notice to the Executive Council before an election was held; and that the appointment of a staff member as an elected leader violates basic principles of union democracy.

Holt Baker was re-elected to the position of executive vice president for a full four-year term at the AFL-CIO's regularly scheduled quadrennial convention in September 2009. In 2013 she was succeeded by Ethiopian-born immigrant Tefere Gebre.

== Political work ==
Holt Baker has been active in Democratic politics most of her adult life. She was elected a delegate from California to the 1988 Democratic National Convention. She was pledged to Michael Dukakis.

Holt Baker rose high within the hierarchy of the Democratic Party of California. She was eventually elected the state party's First Vice Chairwoman. She resigned the position in 1995 to take her job with the AFL-CIO.

== Notes ==
Non-profit organization positions
Preceded by Linda Chavez-Thompson	Executive Vice President of AFL-CIO; September 21, 2007–September 10, 2013	Succeeded by Tefere Gebre
