= 2010 Texas lieutenant gubernatorial election =

- November 2, 2010
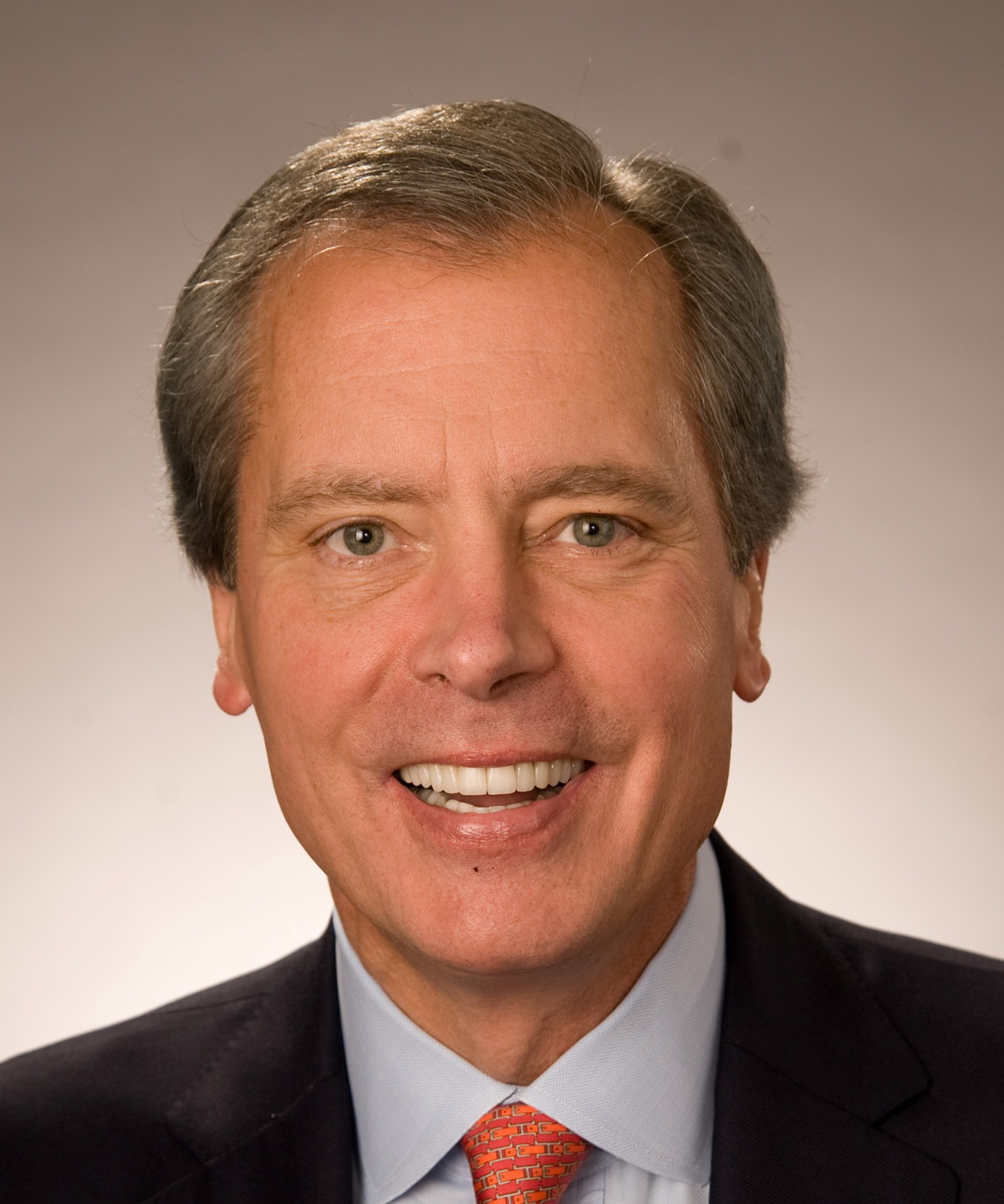

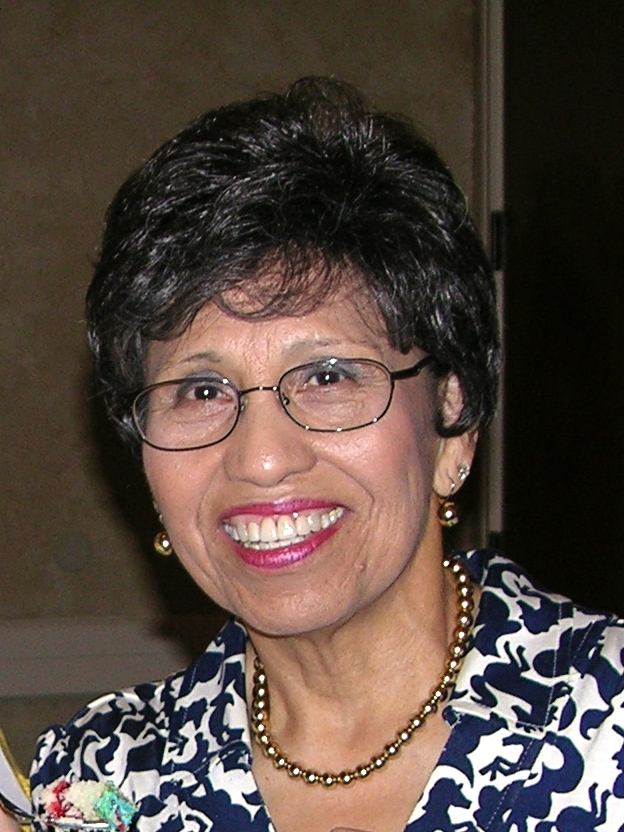
Nominee	David Dewhurst	Linda Chavez-Thompson
Party	Republican	Democratic
Popular vote	3,044,770	1,715,735
Percentage	61.8%	34.8%
- County results Dewhurst: 40–50% 50–60% 60–70% 70–80% 80–90% >90% Chavez-Thompson: 40–50% 50–60% 60–70% 70–80%
Lieutenant Governor before election
David Dewhurst
Republican
Elected Lieutenant Governor
David Dewhurst
Republican

The 2010 Texas lieutenant gubernatorial election was held on November 2, 2010 to elect the Lieutenant Governor of Texas. Incumbent Lieutenant Governor David Dewhurst was reelected in a landslide over Linda Chavez-Thompson. Dewhurst was sworn in for a third term on January 18, 2011.

To date, this is the most recent statewide election in which Dallas County voted for the Republican candidate.

== Republican primary ==
=== Candidates ===
- David Dewhurst, incumbent lieutenant governor

=== Results ===
Republican primary results
Party	Candidate	Votes	%
Republican	David Dewhurst (inc.)	1,176,040	100.0
Total votes		1,176,040	100.0

== Democratic primary ==
=== Candidates ===
Nominee

- Linda Chavez-Thompson, president of the Trade Union Confederation of the Americas (2008–2012)

Eliminated in primary

- Ronnie Earle, former district attorney for Travis County and state representative
- Marc Katz, Austin deli owner

=== Results ===
Democratic primary results
Party	Candidate	Votes	%
Democratic	Linda Chavez-Thompson	314,972	53.13
Democratic	Ronnie Earle	205,516	34.67
Democratic	Marc Katz	72,235	12.18
Total votes		592,723	100.00

== General election ==
=== Candidates ===
- David Dewhurst (R)
- Linda Chavez-Thompson (D)
- Scott Jameson (L)
- Herb Gonzalez, Jr. (G)

=== Results ===
General election results
Party	Candidate	Votes	%
Republican	David Dewhurst (inc.)	3,044,770	61.78
Democratic	Linda Chavez-Thompson	1,715,735	34.83
Libertarian	Scott Jameson	122,142	2.47
Green	Herb Gonzalez, Jr.	44,903	0.90
Total votes		4,935,356	100.00
Republican hold			
