= Angela E. Oh =

American attorney, writer, and activist

- Born: Angela Eunjin Oh; September 8, 1955 (age 69); Los Angeles, California
- Occupation(s): Social and political activist, writer

Angela Eunjin Oh (born September 8, 1955) is an American attorney, teacher, and public lecturer best known for her role as spokesperson for the Korean American community after the 1992 Los Angeles riots and her position on President Bill Clinton's One America Initiative.

== Life and career ==
Oh is a graduate of University of California, Los Angeles, where she earned her Bachelor of Arts and Masters in Public Health degrees. Her Juris Doctor (J.D.) is from the University of California, Davis School of Law (King Hall).

In 1992, Oh gained national prominence as a spokesperson and mediator for the Asian American community in connection with the Los Angeles riots. In June 1997, she was appointed by President Bill Clinton to the President's Initiative on Race. She served as part of a seven-member Advisory Board to the President in an effort directed at examining how race, racism, and racial differences have affected the United States.

Oh has also designed and made presentations for businesses and organizations seeking to prevent claims of discrimination and harassment. She has provided services as a consent decree monitor in matters involving the Equal Employment Opportunity Commission as an external investigator for claims of discrimination or harassment in employment, and as a private consultant to leaders faced with discrimination or harassment cases in their organizations.

Oh was the Chair of U.S. Senator Barbara Boxer's Federal Judicial Nominations Committee for two years, she was a Lawyer Delegate to the Ninth Circuit Judicial Conference, and served as a member of the Federal Magistrate Judge Selection Panel in the Central District of California, for three years.

Between 1998 and 2002, Oh left the full-time practice of law to study, teach, and write. Her speeches and writings reflect the opportunities and challenges that diversity presents. Oh's lectures have taken her into both national and international arenas, including China, Korea, the Middle East, Northern Ireland, and the United Kingdom.

Oh has taught at the University of California, Irvine; University of Southern California; University of California, Los Angeles; and other institutions. In 2002, she finished a collection of essays entitled Open: One Woman’s Journey, published by UCLA’s Asian American Studies Department. Oh is also an ordained Priest, Zen Buddhist Priest – Rinzai Sect.
