= One America Initiative =

One America
- One America in the 21st Century: The President's Initiative on Race

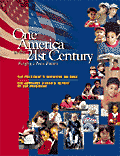
- Final Report

History
- Other short titles: The President's Initiative on Race; The President's Advisory Board on Race
- Established by: Bill Clinton on 14 June 1997
- Related Executive Order number(s): 13050

Membership
- Chairperson: John Hope Franklin
- Other committee members: Linda Chavez-Thompson; Suzan D. Johnson Cook; Thomas H. Kean; Angela E. Oh; Robert J. Thomas; William F. Winter

Jurisdiction
- Purpose: Convening and encouraging community dialogue, fostering improved understanding of race relations

One America in the 21st Century: The President's Initiative on Race, or the One America Initiative, was established by U.S. President Bill Clinton in 1997 with Executive Order 13050. The main thrust of the effort was convening and encouraging community dialogue throughout the country. The Advisory Board's principal legacy was the collection and publication of "best practices" for racial reconciliation and dialogue guidelines designed to help communities discuss how to address racial and ethnic divisions in mutually productive ways.

== Commencement Speech, University of California San Diego ==
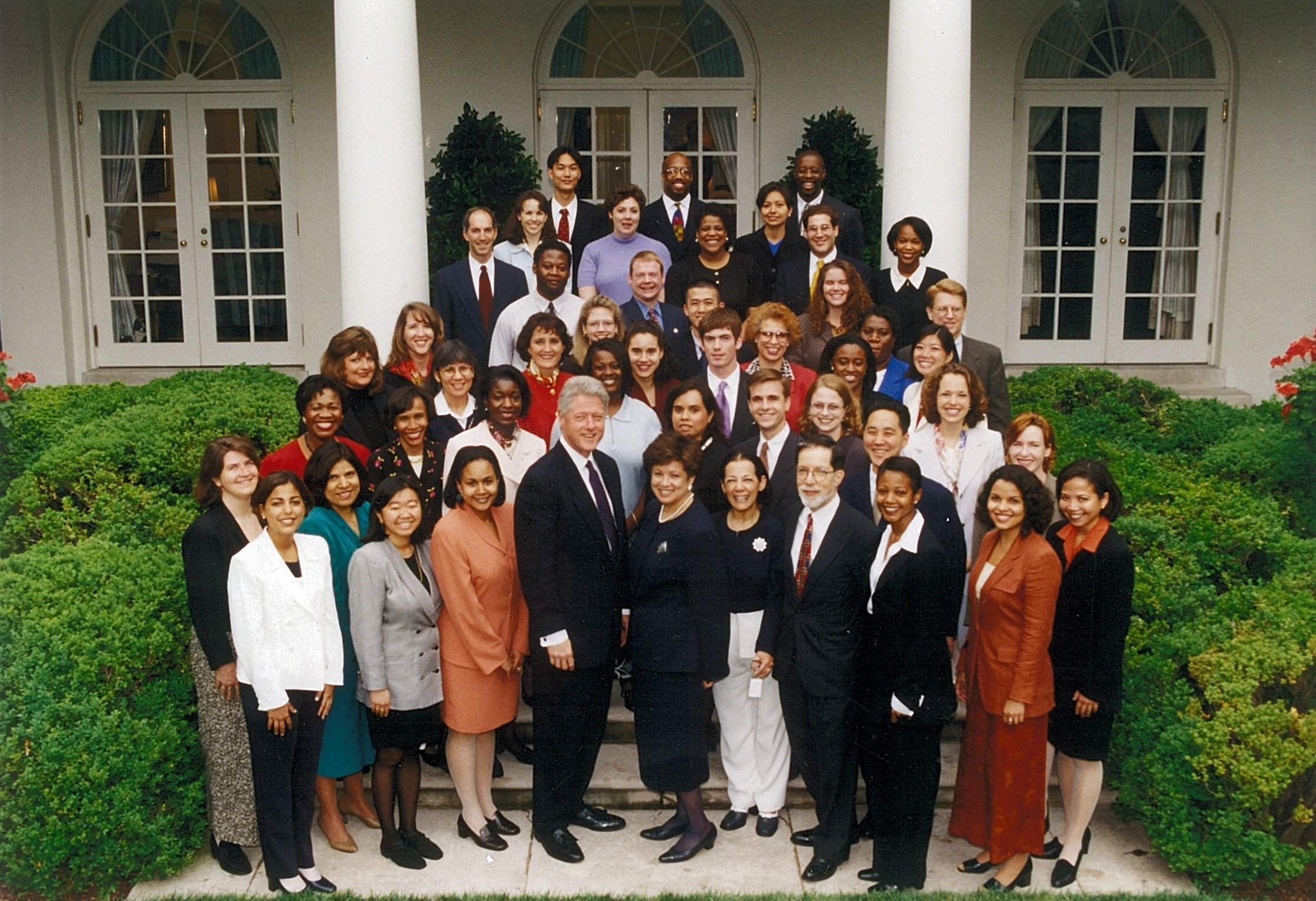
Initiative staff with Bill Clinton in June 1998

President Clinton introduced the initiative during his commencement speech to the graduating class of the university. In the speech, he discussed his own experience growing up in the segregated south and its profound effect on him. He addressed the continuing problems surrounding race in America and the need to find ways to solve them. Clinton envisioned an America based on equal opportunity, fairness, and respect for all as well as shared responsibility and a greater sense of civility. Clinton viewed race relations as something that too often divided and weakened the nation even as America was rapidly becoming the world's first truly-multiracial democracy. The advisory board, chaired by pre-eminent historian Dr. John Hope Franklin, was introduced to the audience as well.

Clinton identified three imperatives for the initiative to focus: expanding opportunity, demanding responsibility, and creating one American community based on respect and shared values.

I want this panel to help educate Americans about the facts surrounding issues of race, to promote a dialogue in every community of the land to confront and work through these issues, to recruit and encourage leadership at all levels to help breach racial divides, and to find, develop and recommend how to implement concrete solutions to our problems -- solutions that will involve all of us in government, business, communities, and as individual citizens.

Judith A. Winston served as executive director of the One America Initiative. Several other senior civil rights Presidential appointees and leaders in the national civil rights community served as senior staff for the Initiative.

Among models of diversity in schools, One America Initiative on Race focused on Fairfax County, Virginia, one of the most-culturally, linguistically diverse school districts in the country. The President's advisory board on Race commissioned a Case Study on a local Elementary School in Fairfax, Virginia and their Report "America in the 21st Century: Forging a New Future Report" quotes Linda Chavez-Thompson, about her visit to Bailey's Elementary School for the Arts and Sciences in December 1997 in her capacity as member of the advisory board on Race

[I]t is absolutely delightful that the children at the elementary level don't know what color is. . .They understand diversity...they celebrate their differences. One young student said, 'And that makes us one. We all are the same inside.' And I got that very distinctly from the curriculum, from the expression of the parents, from the expression of the teachers.... I was absolutely blown away by how intense these young fourth and fifth graders were in expressing why to them there is absolutely no difference between all of them, no matter what their name is and no matter what the color of their skin.

== Advisory board ==
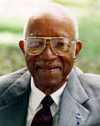
John Hope Franklin

Linda Chavez-Thompson

Suzan D. Johnson Cook

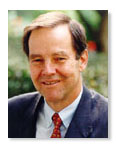
Thomas H. Kean

Angela E. Oh

Robert J. Thomas

William F. Winter

== Reports ==
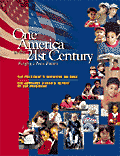
One America in the 21st Century: Forging a New Future

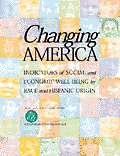
Changing America

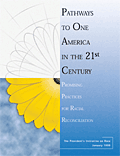
Promising Practices

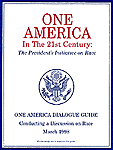
One America Dialogue Guide

== See also ==
- Race relations
