= Robert J. Thomas =

American businessman

Robert J. "Bob" Thomas (1945 – November 23, 2014) was an American executive who was president and chief executive officer of Nissan Motor Corporation, U.S.A., and Clinton administration-appointee for the One America Initiative. Thomas was president and CEO of Nissan Motors USA from 1993 to 1997. In 2000, he became chief executive officer for the North American operations of Edmunds.com, an automotive news provider.

== Early life ==
Thomas was born in Denver, Colorado, in 1945, and grew up in Hyannis, Nebraska, where he worked summers on a ranch. While in high school in North Platte, Nebraska, Thomas was selected to the All-State football team and was also a Scholastic All-American in his senior year. He was appointed to the United States Air Force Academy, where he received a bachelor of science degree in engineering management in 1967. He was also a member of the academy's track and field team, participating in the sprint medley, shot put and discus. In his senior year, he was commander of the 22nd Squadron and a member of the academy's ethics committee.

== Military and professional career ==
Upon graduation he served in the United States Air Force until 1972, achieving the rank of captain. His service included a tour of duty at the Space and Missile Systems Center in the Los Angeles area, where he was the financial manager for a program office handling a restricted-data defense system. Following his honorable discharge, he worked briefly for the Allstate Insurance Company before moving to the Ford Motor Company, where he spent ten years with Ford's Lincoln-Mercury division prior to joining Nissan.

Soon after arriving at Nissan Thomas was running its sales operations, and in a 1988 reorganization that divided the company into three entities (Nissan, Infiniti and parts and service) Thomas was made a vice president and head of the Nissan division. In 1993 he succeeded Thomas Mignanelli as corporate president and CEO when Mignanelli retired after heart surgery. However, after 21-month slide in sales, Nissan announced on October 7, 1997, that Thomas was resigning for personal reasons. He was replaced by Minoru Nakamura, then-current chairman of Nissan Motors USA and president of Nissan North America (the parent company of Nissan Motors USA).

In July 2000, Roberts was named chief executive officer for North American operations of Edmunds.com, responsible for North American sales and marketing, partner relationship management and business development. In November of that same year, he was promoted to corporate chief operating officer, with Peter Steinlauf (the controlling shareholder) assuming the titles of chairman and CEO. He served in that position until his retirement in August 2004.

== Honors and awards ==
In February 1997, Thomas was appointed as an advisory board member to the "One America in the 21st Century: The President's Initiative on Race" commission as the sole business representative on the seven-person body. He also served on the Board of Directors for the Smithsonian Institution's New Business Ventures in 1998 and 1999.
