= Lt. Gov. You've Gotta Love =

Political advertisement by David Dewhurst

"Lt. Gov. You've Gotta Love" (also called "David Dewhurst: Lt. Gov. You've Gotta Love") was a political advertisement issued by incumbent David Dewhurst's campaign on YouTube during the 2014 primary runoff for Lieutenant Governor of Texas against Dan Patrick. Dewhurst, the three-term Lieutenant Governor, faced primary challenge from Tea Party favorite Dan Patrick. During the primary, Patrick triggered a runoff between Dewhurst and himself by only capturing 41% of the vote.

The night before the runoff, Dewhurst's campaign released "Lt. Gov. You've Gotta Love", a disco-themed advertisement. The advertisement features vocals extolling Dewhurst over top of a pulsating disco beat. It ends with a long list of Dewhurst's accomplishments during this three terms as lieutenant governor that appear on the screen to the beat of the music.

Political reporters disliked "Lt. Gov. You've Gotta Love". One reporter claimed that the best way to understand the advertisement was to see it as avant-garde artwork. Other reporters reactions ranged from calling the advertisement quirky to writing that it was ridiculous.

== Background ==
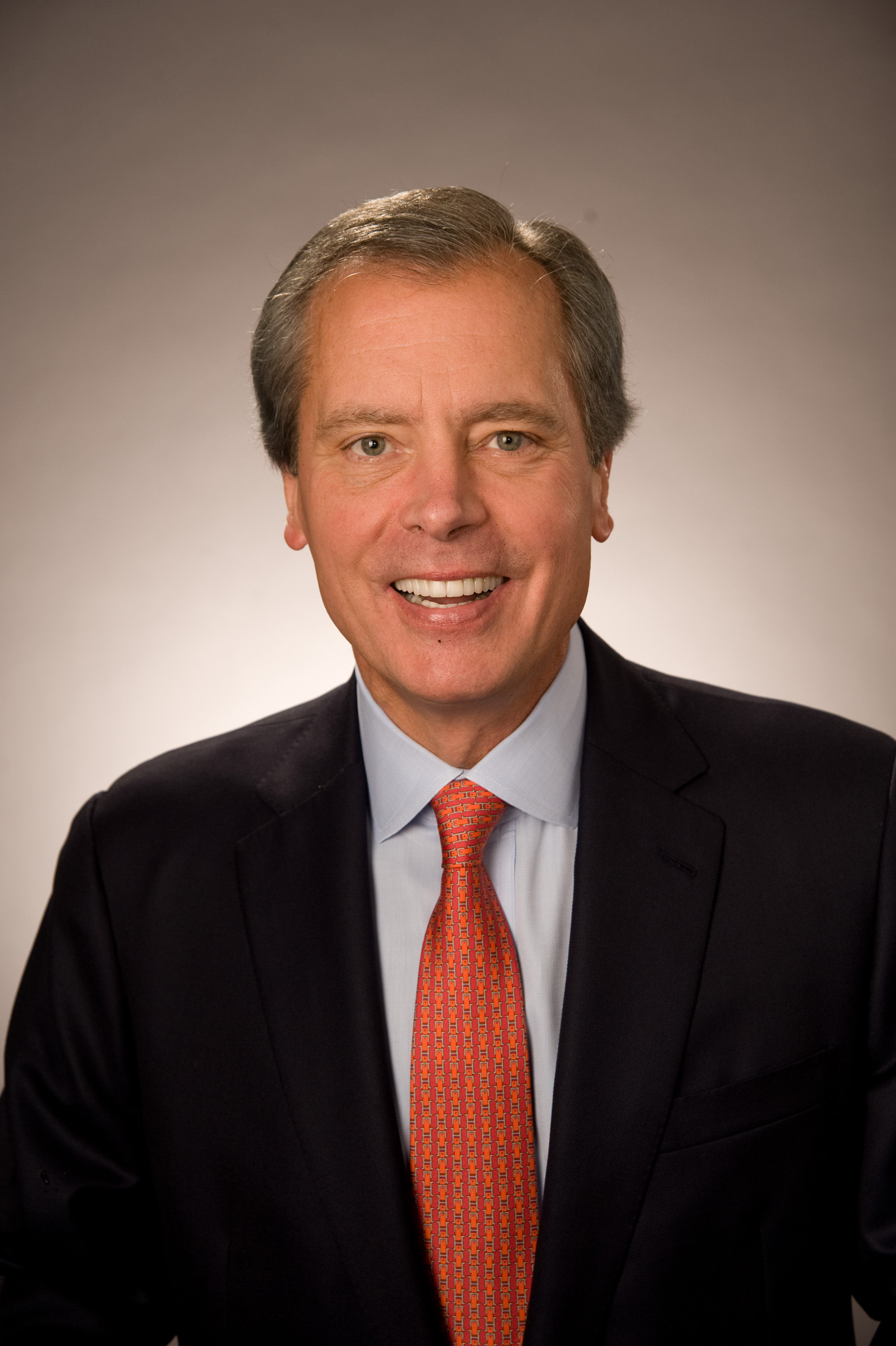
David Dewhurst in 2009

Between 2003 and 2015, David Dewhurst served as the 42nd Lieutenant Governor of Texas. During his three terms as lieutenant governor, Dewhurst helped pass the controversial 2003 Texas redistricting plan as well as "business friendly" legislation. In 2012, Dewhurst ran for the United States Senate and lost in a primary runoff to Ted Cruz.

In 2014, Dewhurst, who was seen as an establishment Republican, faced a primary challenge against a Tea Party-backed candidate, Dan Patrick. In the 2014 Republican primary, Patrick triggered a runoff election by only gathering 41% of the vote; Dewhurst gathered 28% of the vote. During the weeks leading up to the runoff election, Dewhurst ran a negative campaign that included a parody of "Let It Go" from the Disney film Frozen that claimed that Patrick changed his name to hide a past bankruptcy. In the days leading up to the election, Dewhurst was polling far from Patrick. "Lt. Gov. You've Gotta Love" was created by Ben Price, Dewhurst's creative director, as the final advertisement of the election. At 8:00 PM on the night before the runoff, Dewhurst's campaign released "Lt. Gov. You've Gotta Love". Dewhurst failed to win the runoff-primary for a fourth term as lieutenant governor.

== Synopsis ==
"Lt. Gov. You've Gotta Love" is a disco-themed campaign ad. The advertisement starts out with the draw of a slide guitar and establishing shots of a bus in rural Texas traveling on Texas State Highway 121. It quickly switches from the guitar to a pulsing disco beat with vocals over it extolling the conservative virtues of Dewhurst and his campaign promises. In one section, the advertisement claims that Dewhurst is the "most pro-life candidate" running for lieutenant governor. In another, the singers claim that Dewhurst will keep "Obamanation" away from Texas.

While this is going on, in a split screen, Dewhurst can be seen performing a variety of activities. He starts out walking down a hall to the beat of the music, an homage to Saturday Night Fever. In one shot, Dewhurst can be seen roping cattle, and in another, Dewhurst is speaking to a pro-life organization. "Lt. Gov. You've Gotta Love" draws to a close with a list of Dewhurst's accomplishments during his three terms. Each bullet point appears on the screen with the beat of the music. It ends with the address of Dewhurst's campaign website.

== Reactions ==
"Lt. Gov. You've Gotta Love" was panned by political reporters. They did however draw parallels to the advertisement to such diverse influences as Daft Punk, Kanye West, John Cornyn and Saturday Night Fever. Jonathan Tilove, for Statesman, praised Dewhurst's campaign for "pushing the envelope", but thought that the advertisement was better understood as avant-garde artwork. Bud Kennedy, for the Fort Worth Star-Telegram, wrote that "Lt. Gov. You've Gotta Love" was an attempt to make Dewhurst look relaxed, something that he pointed out was far from the truth. Ben Jacobs, writing for The Daily Beast, wrote that Dewhurst was "channeling Kanye West" to his heartbreak. Other reporters found "Lt. Gov. You've Gotta Love" quirky, bizarre and ridiculous.
