= Linda Chavez-Thompson =

Mexican-American union leader

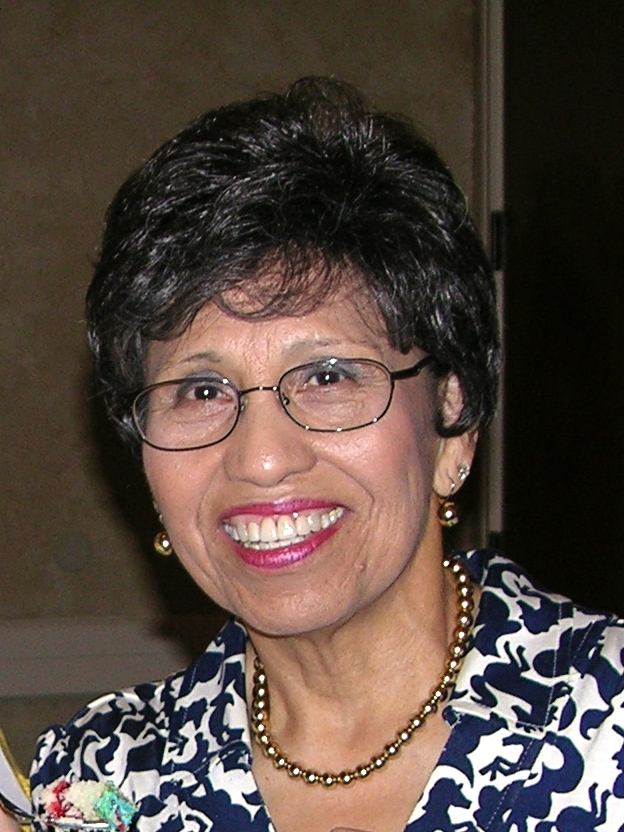
- Chavez-Thompson in 2010

President of the Trade Union Confederation of the Americas
- In office 2008–2012
- Preceded by: Position established
- Succeeded by: Hassan Yussuff

Personal details
- Born: August 3, 1944 (age 82)
- Party: Democratic
- Spouse(s): Divorced; Robert Thompson (deceased)
- Children: 2

Linda Chavez-Thompson (born August 3, 1944) is a second-generation Mexican-American union leader. She was elected the executive vice-president of the AFL-CIO in 1995 and served until September 21, 2007. She was also a vice chair of the Democratic National Committee from 1997 to 2012 and served as a member of the board of trustees of United Way of America. She was the Democratic nominee for Lieutenant Governor of Texas in the 2010 election.

== Early life ==
Chavez-Thompson's place of birth is unclear. Although she has been described by some sources as an "illegal immigrant", other references contend that she was born in Lorenzo in Crosby County in West Texas and reared in Lubbock. Her father was a sharecropper, and she was one of seven children. At the age of 10, she took a job hoeing cotton in the fields in Lorenzo for the summer. It was a job she worked at for the next nine years. She also picked cotton for several years. She dropped out of high school at age 16 to help support her family, and married at the age of 20. She gave birth to a daughter in 1964 and a son in 1976. She divorced her first husband in 1984 and the next year married Robert Thompson, the long-time president of the Amalgamated Transit Local 694 in San Antonio. He died in 1993 of complications of lung cancer.

== Early union activities ==
In 1967, Chavez-Thompson became a secretary on the staff of the Construction Laborer's Local 1253 in Lubbock, Texas Laborers' International Union of North America. When a tornado struck the Lubbock area that year, she volunteered to coordinate the Texas AFL-CIO's relief efforts. She enjoyed the job so much, she became a staff organizer for the North Texas Laborers District Council. Her first organizing campaign was to help city workers in Lubbock form a union. They were successful.

Realizing that public sector organizing was what she enjoyed most, Chavez-Thompson joined the staff of the American Federation of State, County and Municipal Employees as an International Representative in 1971. She then went to work for (AFSCME Local #2399) in San Antonio in 1973 as an assistant business agent. She was promoted to business agent, then was appointed executive director of Local 2399, AFSCME's San Antonio affiliate. She became a fixture on local TV and in local newspapers. In 1978, she opposed a wildcat strike by members of her local, knowing they would be fired for striking.

She was subsequently elected to the executive boards of the San Antonio Central Labor Council and the Texas AFL-CIO. She was elected a vice president of the Labor Council for Latin American Advancement in 1986. She was first elected an international vice president of AFSCME in 1988. In 1993, Chavez-Thompson became the first Hispanic woman elected to the Executive Council of the AFL-CIO. On March 1, 1995, she was elected executive director of AFSCME Texas Council 42, a statewide council of the union based in Austin with 12,000 members in 21 unions.

== AFL-CIO career ==
=== Election ===
Chavez-Thompson was elected executive vice-president of the AFL-CIO after John Sweeney ran for the presidency of the labor federation in 1995. The Sweeney campaign initially recruited Chavez-Thompson in May 1995 to serve as the AFL-CIO's secretary-treasurer. But a month later, Sweeney asked Richard Trumka to accept that position. Sweeney subsequently offered to create the post of executive vice-president and asked Chavez-Thompson to be his running mate for that position.

During the ensuing campaign, Sweeney complained that supporters of Thomas R. Donahue, unfairly criticized Chavez-Thompson's qualifications for office. Donahue admittedly opposed creation of the position, but Donahue's supporters went further and claimed that "Sweeney's proposal to create a new leadership office for council member Linda Chavez-Thompson smacks of tokenism."

In June 1995, AFL-CIO incumbent president Lane Kirkland resigned. Secretary-Treasurer Donahue was elected by the AFL-CIO Executive Council as his interim replacement at the regularly scheduled Executive Council meeting in early August. After his appointment, Donahue announced he would run for president of the labor federation in October 1995. In a gesture aimed at unionized women and clearly intended to defuse the excitement caused by Chavez-Thompson's candidacy, Donahue named Barbara Easterling, secretary-treasurer of the Communications Workers of America, as his choice for AFL-CIO secretary-treasurer. On August 1, 1995, Easterling was appointed by the AFL-CIO Executive Council to the position vacated by Donahue—making her the first woman to serve as an AFL-CIO officer (albeit an appointed officer).

The creation of the office of executive vice-president at the AFL-CIO convention in October nearly did not happen. Donahue's supporters claimed that the office was created only to ensure Chavez-Thompson's election after Sweeney passed her over in favor of Trumka. They also opposed the new position because it would allegedly cost $500,000 a year to run and staff it. The charges proved effective with delegates at a time when the AFL-CIO could find few funds for organizing. A two-thirds vote of the delegates was needed to create the position, but the Sweeney camp's internal vote count showed that only about 57 percent of the delegates supported the proposal. In early October 1995, Sweeney began working to persuade delegates to delay a vote on the issue until after the AFL-CIO presidential election on October 24. His hope was that Donahue backers might support creating the position if Donahue had already been defeated. At the AFL-CIO Convention in Chicago, Sweeney's delegates submitted a motion on October 23 to postpone debate on the new position until after the presidential balloting. A voice vote was held, and Donahue (the convention chair) ruled that the motion was defeated. Sweeney's forces asked for a division of the house, which showed the motion passing.

On October 25, 1995, 34 unions representing roughly 7.2 million AFL-CIO members voted to create the office of executive vice-president. The measure passed by a mere 700,000 votes out of more than 13 million cast. Chavez-Thompson was elected to fill the position on a voice vote, and Sweeney (now chair of the convention) declared her elected by acclamation. Her election was a "first" in many ways: She became the first woman elected (rather than appointed) an AFL-CIO officer, the first person of color of either sex elected an AFL-CIO officer, and the first Hispanic elected an AFL-CIO officer.

=== Activities as executive vice-president ===
During her tenure as executive vice-president, Chavez-Thompson provided leadership in a number of areas. She spent most of 1996 on the road, acting as the public face of the AFL-CIO and the Sweeney administration's primary shock trooper. She helped with the AFL-CIO's electoral efforts in the 1996 federal elections, and helped with the federation's 1996 push to increase the minimum wage (a program called "America Needs a Raise").

Beginning in 1996, Chavez-Thompson headed up the AFL-CIO's policy-making group on immigration reform. She was instrumental in the federation's push for reform in 1996 and 1997, and helped forge a new majority on the AFL-CIO Executive Council which later adopted a radical change in the federation's immigrant policy in 2000.

In 2003, President Sweeney appointed her to an AFL-CIO task force on organizing. She also was active in the AFL-CIO's federal electoral efforts in 2004.

== Political work ==
Chavez-Thompson has been a lifelong Democrat. In 1988, she was elected a delegate from San Antonio pledged to Dukakis. In 1992 and 1996, she was elected as a Democratic delegate pledged to Bill Clinton, and in 1996 was named an honorary co-chair of his re-election campaign.

In January 1997, she was elected a vice chair of the Democratic National Committee (DNC) and appointed a vice chair of the 52nd Presidential Inaugural Committee. The same year, she was also appointed a member of Advisory Board to President Clinton's One America Initiative. Chavez-Thompson was re-elected a vice chair of the DNC for four-year terms until she stepped down in 2012.

== Retirement ==
On September 11, 2007, Chavez-Thompson announced she would retire from her post as AFL-CIO executive vice-president on September 21, 2007. President Sweeney nominated Arlene Holt Baker, an African American and Chavez-Thompson's long-time aide, to be the federation's next executive vice-president. On January 4, 2010, Chavez-Thompson announced she was running for the Democratic nomination for Lieutenant Governor of Texas, and on March 2 she won her party's nomination. She was defeated in the general election by the incumbent Republican David Dewhurst in November.

== Notes ==
Trade union offices
Preceded by Dick Martin	President of the ICFTU Inter American Regional Organisation of Workers; 2001–2008	Succeeded by Federation merged
Party political offices
Preceded by Maria Luisa Alvarado	Democratic nominee for Lieutenant Governor of Texas; 2010	Succeeded by Leticia Van de Putte
