= 1199 (disambiguation) =

1199 was a common year starting on Friday of the Julian calendar.

1199 may also refer to:

== Unions ==
- 1199: The National Health Care Workers' Union, a union established in 1932 by Leon J. Davis
  - 1199SEIU United Healthcare Workers East, a descendant of the original 1199 union
  - SEIU Local 1199NE, the New England branch of the 1199 union
  - 1199 Plaza, a housing project developed by 1199 union members

== Astronomy ==
- 1199 Geldonia, an Eoan asteroid

== Sports ==
- Ducati 1199, a sports bike introduced in 2011

== See also ==
- List of unions designated 1199
- German submarine U-1199
