= 1969 Charleston hospital strike =

Labor strike in the U.S. civil rights movement

Charleston hospital strike
- Part of the Civil Rights Movement in South Carolina
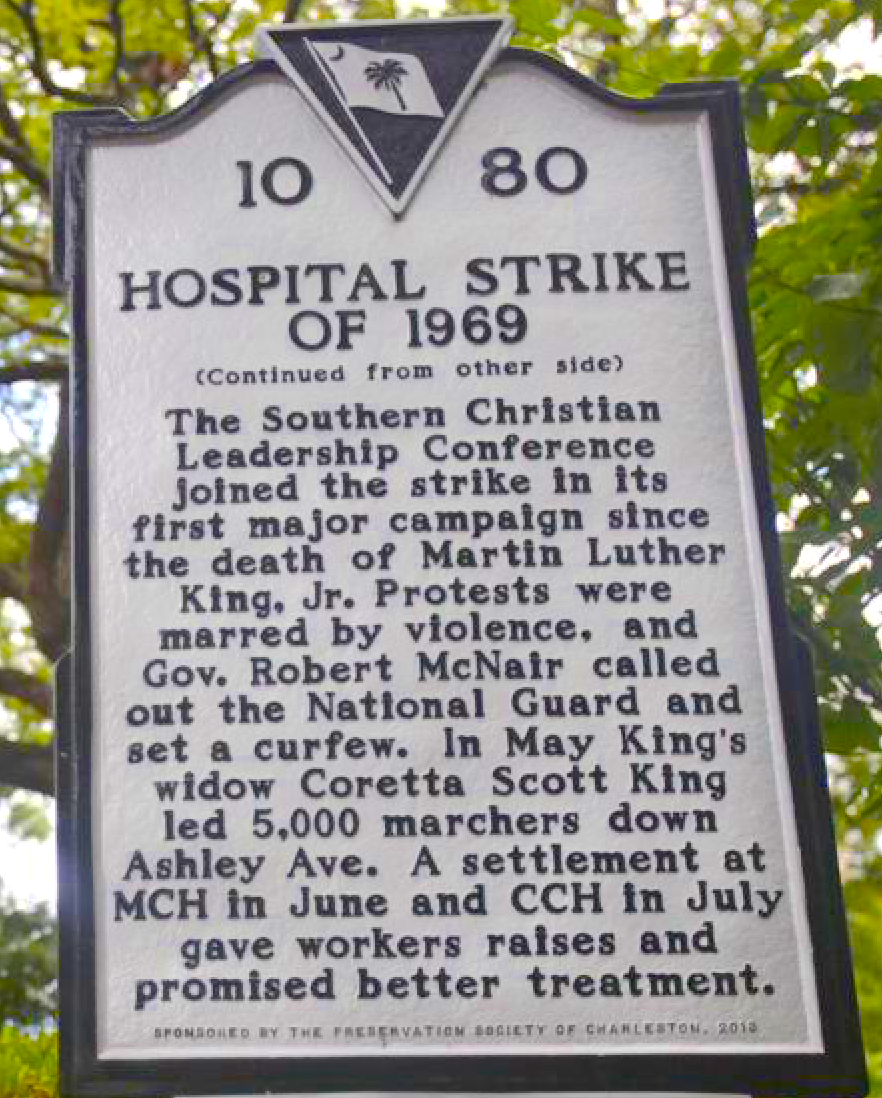
- Date: March 19, 1969 – June 27, 1969
- Location: Charleston, South Carolina
- Caused by: Pay inequality; Racial discrimination in the workforce; Racial segregation within the hospital
- Result: Increase of pay for African-American hospital employees; More equitable policies for employees

Parties
Southern Christian Leadership Conference (SCLC); National Association for the Advancement of Colored People (NAACP); 1199 Healthcare Union	State of South Carolina; South Carolina National Guard; Medical College Hospital; Charleston County

Lead figures
President of 1199B: Mary Moultrie; National Figure: Coretta Scott King; SCLC members: Ralph Abernathy; Andrew Young	Governor of South Carolina: Robert Evander McNair; President of Medical College Hospital: Dr. William McCord

The Charleston hospital strike was a two-month movement in Charleston, South Carolina that protested the unfair and unequal treatment of African American hospital workers. Protests began after twelve black employees were fired for voicing their concerns to the president of Medical College Hospital, which is now the Medical University of South Carolina. The strike was one of the last campaigns of the civil rights movement in South Carolina, and the first of the Southern Christian Leadership Conference since the assassination of Martin Luther King Jr. the year before.

== Background ==
Five years after the passage of the Civil Rights Act of 1964, African Americans in Charleston's Medical College Hospital were still treated more poorly than white employees. Several African American hospital workers had been attempting to meet with Dr. William McCord, the president of the hospital, to discuss low wages, discrimination, and verbal abuse on the job. One nurse, Mary Grimes-Vanderhorst, claimed that she was unjustly demoted from a nurse to a nursing assistant because of her race, consequentially reducing her pay. Other African American nurses and hospital workers stated that they were being paid less than white employees who did the same work, receiving $1.30 per hour, 30¢ below the minimum wage. Black employees often complained that racial slurs and racist comments had been used against them and that the hospital had taken no action to discipline employees who made such comments. Some African American workers were prohibited from eating their lunch in break rooms because of segregation, and were forced to eat outside or in boiler rooms.

In September 1968, some hospital workers contacted Local 1199, a national health care workers' union. Local 1199 agreed to establish a chapter in Charleston, named Local 1199B, with Mary Moultrie as its president. Moultrie was also an employee of the hospital. The Local 1199B union, with assistance from the Southern Christian Leadership Conference (SCLC), requested formal recognition from the hospital's president, which was rejected. On March 18, 1969, President McCord agreed to meet with Moultrie and several other employees during their lunch break. But McCord brought an anti-union delegation outnumbering Moultrie’s group. Moultrie and her colleagues walked out of the meeting knowing that compromise would not be possible with the anti-union delegation's presence. Moultrie and eleven other workers briefly took over the president’s office in protest. The twelve workers were accused of leaving their patients unattended and were terminated that day. However, according to Louise Brown, one of the African American women who was fired, the twelve workers were on their lunch break; their patients, as usual, were already covered by other hospital staff.

== Strike ==
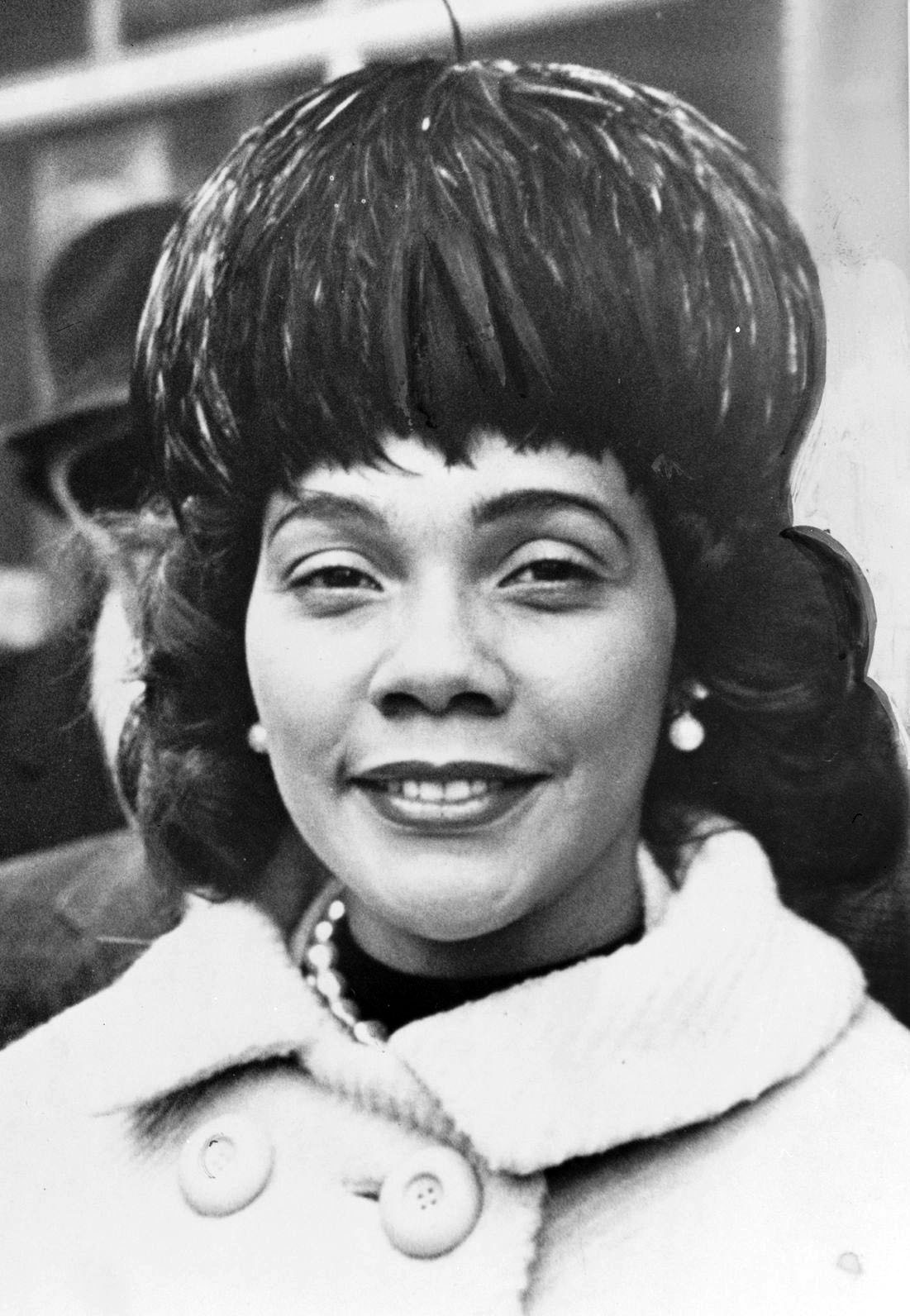
Coretta Scott King, wife of the late Martin Luther King Jr., led part of the Charleston Hospital Workers Strike.

In response to the firing of the twelve African American employees, on March 19, 1969, over sixty African American hospital employees walked off of their jobs and led a strike against the hospital. Both hospital employers, the State of South Carolina and Charleston County, committed to using any means at their disposal to avoid unionization. Within a few hours of the beginning of the strike, the Medical College prohibited all picketing, which was later amended to require picketers to stand no fewer than twenty yards apart. One nurse, Naomi White, created a group called Hell's Angels, which went to hospital workers' homes to encourage them to strike or protest, though Moultrie and the SCLC were unaware of the Angels. Governor Robert McNair prohibited the Medical College and Charleston County from compromising with the strikers and to urged them to avoid anything that would appear to be collective bargaining. McNair feared that the strike would lead to more strikes in other fields of work around the state.

On April 25, 1969, Governor McNair ordered over 1,000 state troopers and National Guardsmen, imposed a 9 p.m. to 5 a.m. curfew, and declared a state of emergency. Some protesters defied the curfew and led the strike into the night. By early summer, armored personnel carriers and soldiers with fixed-bayonets had arrived in the city. Violence increased against strikers: one union member's hotel room was firebombed and mysterious fires erupted around the city. Mary Moultrie moved out of her home for her family’s safety and slept on a cot at the union hall under the guard of armed youths. William Bill Saunders, a Korean War veteran who participated in the strike, observed that police arrested dozens of people daily. Over 1,000 people were arrested throughout the civil conflict.

By the end of April, the movement gathered the support of Coretta Scott King and SCLC members Andrew Young and Ralph Abernathy. In an April 30 address at Emanuel African Methodist Episcopal Church, King stated, "I feel that the black woman in our nation, the black working woman is perhaps the most discriminated against of all of the working women, the black woman." After the speech, King, alongside Mary Moultrie, led a 2,000-person march. The following week on Mother's Day, over ten thousand people, including five U.S. Congressmen, marched in downtown Charleston. The tourist industry of Charleston was strained as a result of these marches as protesters clogged public streets and markets. Local 1199B created advertisements that sought to encourage locals to purchase only food and medicine to further disrupt the city's economy.

Most politicians in South Carolina agreed with Governor McNair's response to the strike, though his constituents grew increasingly frustrated by the ongoing fallout. Many businesses in Charleston were negatively affected by the strikes, both by strikers blocking establishments and the imposed 9 p.m. curfew. Some businesses reported revenue reductions by as much as 50%, including the Holiday Inn and other hotels that were forced to cancel events and conferences. Additionally, the South Carolina Task Force for Community Uplift noted that the use of national guard forces required $10,000 daily (approximately $71,000 in 2020 dollars).

== Settlement and aftermath ==
A federal investigation charged the Medical College Hospital with 37 instances of civil rights violation and threatened to cut off $12 million in federal funding. President McCord yielded, and on June 27, 1969, he announced that a settlement had been made between the hospital and the strikers. The Medical College Hospital promised to rehire strikers the following week, including the original twelve employees who had been fired, and to abide by a newly established six-step grievance process, and to provide modest pay increases. Though the union was never formally recognized by the Hospital or by any level of government, the strike was considered a success. Consequently, African Americans at the Medical College received higher pay and a more transparent system of hiring. Within a few months of the strike's end, Local 1199 withdrew its support from Charleston after failing to secure legal recognition. The 1970 political documentary I Am Somebody, directed by Madeline Anderson, highlighted the Charleston strikes on a national level.

On August 15, 1969, two hundred black Charleston city sanitation workers led a similar strike to protest and demanded better wages and improved working conditions. After two months, the strike was resolved with a compromise.

== See also ==
- African Americans in South Carolina
