= List of unions designated 1199 =

Several unions have been referred to as 1199 within the United States.

== Original ==
- Local 1199, the historical national healthcare workers' union.

== SEIU affiliates ==
- 1199SEIU, the largest healthcare worker labor union in the United States.
  - SEIU Local 1199E which merged with SEIU Local 1998 to form 1199SEIU Maryland/DC Division.
- SEIU Local 1199NE, the New England branch of the original Local 1199.
- SEIU Local 1199NW, the Washington State branch of the original Local 1199.
- SEIU District 1199P, the former name for SEIU Healthcare Pennsylvania and the Pittsburgh branch of the original Local 1199.
- SEIU District 1199 WV/KY/OH, the West Virginia, Kentucky, and Ohio branch of the original Local 1199.

== AFSCME affiliates ==
- District 1199C in Philadelphia which voted to affiliate with American Federation of State, County and Municipal Employees (AFSCME) in 1989. It was originally established in December 1969.
- District 1199J formed in 1977 in New Jersey and which also voted to affiliate with AFSCME instead of SEIU.
- District 1199NM formed in New Mexico in 1974
- District 1199DC formed in Washington, D.C.

== Defunct ==
- Local 1199B, the defunct affiliate of Retail, Wholesale and Department Store Union originally organized by members of the first Local 1199.
- Local 1199D, a defunct union organized by members of the first Local 1199 which once sought recognition in Durham, North Carolina.
- Local 1199H, a former union effort by members of the original Local 1199 which failed to get recognition in Dayton, Ohio.
