= Federation of Hospital and University Employees =

The Federation of Hospital And University Employees is a coalition of labor unions in New Haven, Connecticut, United States, which represents thousands of workers at Yale University and Yale New Haven Hospital. The federation currently includes recognized unions UNITE HERE Locals 34 and 35, which represent university food service, maintenance, and custodial workers, and clerical and technical workers, respectively. UNITE HERE has also, for the last fifteen years, supported the organizing efforts of graduate student teachers and researchers in the Graduate Employees and Students Organization. Finally, the Federation also includes the 150 dietary workers at Yale New Haven Hospital who are members of Local 1199NE of the Service Employees International Union (SEIU). Since 1998, this union has conducted an organizing campaign of about 1,800 other blue-collar service workers at the hospital. On March 22, 2006, the union and hospital agreed to an agreement governing the conduct of both parties in a neutral election process by which hospital employees will be able to vote on whether to unionize.

== History ==
The Federation of University Employees was formed in 1951 when Local 142 of the United Construction Workers–CIO, representing custodial and maintenance workers at Yale University, disaffiliated with its international union in favor of fiscal and strategic independence. In 1955, the union organized food service workers in Yale's residential college dining halls and, a year later, affiliated with the Hotel and Restaurant Employees and Bartenders International Union, which later changed its name to the Hotel Employees and Restaurant Employees International Union (HERE) and merged with a union of textile and laundry workers in 2004 to become UNITE HERE. The service and maintenance and physical plant workers who comprised the federation's membership were at this time all grouped into Local 35.

The union's origins thus lie in the wave of militant and ambitious organizing precipitated by the CIO in the 1930s and 1940s, as the immigrant workers who had built and staffed Yale's new residential colleges began to organize themselves into an industrial union with the aid of CIO organizer John Clark and several sympathetic professors in Yale's Divinity School.

In 1953 the union engaged in a two-week strike for a maintenance of membership clause in its contract with the university. In 1968, the union, which had been quiescent throughout the 1950s and early sixties even as Yale president Kingman Brewster introduced two corporate executives from the Inland Steel Corporation to govern the university's Human Resource department with a Taylorist ethic.

In 1968, the union struck again, lasting a week and voting by a slim margin to accept a contract which many workers felt was substandard. Students served as temporary replacement workers and the union's business agent, New York lawyer Moss Schenk, was fired and replaced with New Haven labor leader Vincent J. Sirabella, the president of the New Haven Central Labor Council.

The union struck again in 1971, 1974, and 1977. These strikes were each longer than the last and were each the longest strikes in the university's history at the time of their conclusion. (The 1977 strike lasted 13 weeks and is still the longest strike Yale has ever seen.)

Beginning in the late 1940s, but really taking off in the mid-late 1960s, came successive attempts to organize the feminized, "pink-collar" workforce of Yale's clerical and technical employees by District 65, the Office and Professional Employees International Union (OPEIU), and the United Auto Workers (UAW). In 1983, a homegrown organizing drive by HERE to organize these workers finally succeeded. The union, HERE Local 34, won a National Labor Relations Board election by six votes in the face of intimidation tactics by university management and entrenched structures of favoritism and nepotistic promotion. When the university refused to negotiate a first contract with Local 34, workers began a ten-week strike on September 26, 1984. Local 35 members refused to cross their sister local's picket lines and joined their strike. Undergraduates and graduate students mobilized to support them. The strike attracted national attention from inside and outside the labor movement and was a beacon of light in a dark time for U.S. union movements when Yale settled on the terms of a contract with first the victorious Local 34 and then on an unprecedented contract with Local 35 as well.

In 1990, teaching and research assistants in the Graduate School of Arts and Sciences decided to organize a union, GESO, and affiliated with the federation. There were several strikes in the 1990s, including two successive one month walkouts by Locals 35 and 34, respectively, in the spring semester of 1996. The 1996 strike was concerned primarily with the issue of subcontracting. During the strike, Local 35 organized nearly 300 casual workers into its bargaining unit, but Yale inserted a loophole into the contract which gave it the ability to subcontract work in any new or renovated buildings, and then promptly began a campaign to renovate nearly all of its major buildings.

In 1998 the federation struck a partnership with the SEIU to organize approximately 1800 unorganized workers at Yale-New Haven hospital, and the Federation became a multi-union, collaborative endeavor, The Federation of Hospital and University Employees.

In January 2002, the union's contract with the university expired. The union had agreed to a six-year, rather than a four-year contract during the previous negotiation cycle in order to avoid labor strife during the university's tercentennial celebrations. The university hired John Stepp of Restructuring Associates, Inc. to facilitate Interest-based bargaining in the hopes of avoiding the rancorous disputes of past contract cycles. In May 2002, Yale abruptly terminated Stepp's employment without previously notifying the federation. On September 25, 2002, 675 workers, students, and other members of the New Haven community were arrested in an act of mass civil disobedience.

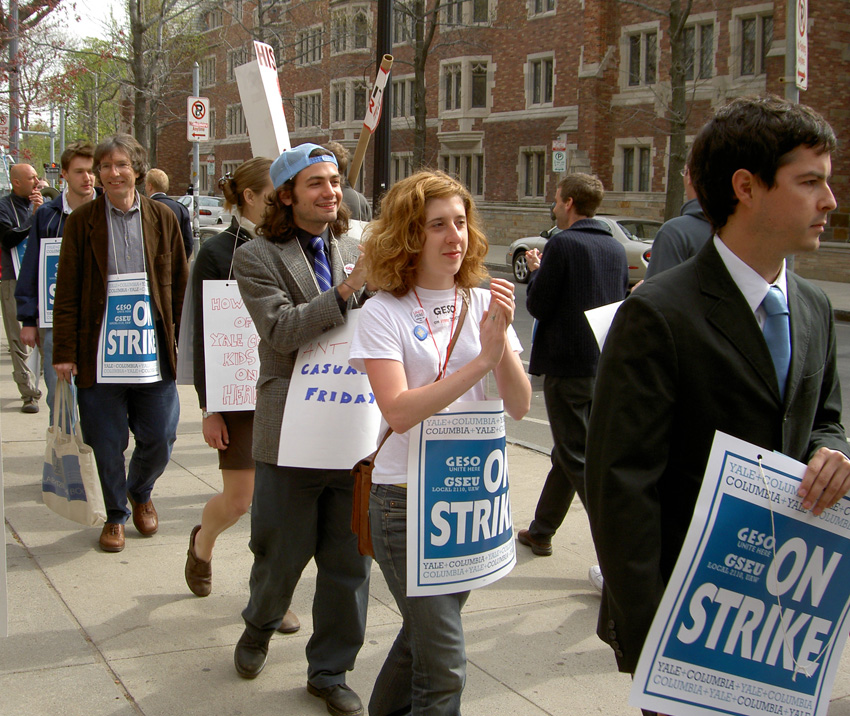
A GESO picket-line in front of Yale's Hall of Graduate Studies, April 2005

In January, 2003, the union offered to enter into binding arbitration with the university, but administrators refused the offer. A one-week-long strike took place between March 3 and March 7, 2003, garnering support from Cornel West, Jesse Jackson, John Sweeney, Dennis Rivera, John Wilhelm, and Andy Stern, as well as thousands of workers, thousands of members of the community who marched on the university on the strike's first day to demand equal access to jobs and the desegregation of the university's hiring structures, and hundreds of undergraduates, who staged a walkout on the strike's snowy fourth day and held classes in the street.

With negotiations effectively dead over the summer, the Federation struck again in late August, after a group of retirees occupied the university's investment office to demand to know the status and whereabouts of a university-administered pension fund. The strike was settled on September 18, 2003 after several days of negotiations mediated by New Haven Mayor John Destefano and a 10,000-strong labor march which shut down downtown New Haven five days earlier.

In April, 2005, GESO struck again for one week and continues to campaign, with the support of the rest of the Federation, for union recognition.

== Other Yale Unions ==
Section(9)(b)(3) of the National Labor Relations Act—a part of the Taft–Hartley amendments—bans security guards from belonging to the same union as other workers of the same employer without the employer's permission. This prohibition extends beyond belonging to the same local or even the same international union; security officers cannot belong to any AFL–CIO affiliated union if other employees are members of an affiliate. The Yale administration has withheld its permission, so the university's police officers and security guards are not members of FHUE. Officers of the Yale University Police Department are members of the Yale Police Benevolent Association, which affiliated in 2005 with the Connecticut Organization for Public Safety Employees, an independent union. In 2010, Yale security officers were initially organized by AFSCME, an AFL–CIO affiliate union. Yale objected on section(9)(b)(3) grounds, and the National Labor Relations Board sided with the employer. Instead, the security officers voted to join the International Union of Security, Police and Fire Professionals of America.

== See also ==
- Graduate Employees and Students Organization
- UNITE HERE

== References and sources ==
- Toni Gilpin, Dan Letwin, Gary Isaac, and Jack McKivigan. On Strike For Respect: The Yale University Clerical and Technical Workers Strike, 1984–1985. Urbana: University of Illinois Press. 1995 [1987]
- Deborah Sue Elkin, Labor and The Left: The Limits of Acceptable Dissent at Yale University, 1920s to 1950s. PhD dissertation, Yale University, 1995.
- Herbert Janick, "Yale Blue: Unionization at Yale University, 1931–1985", Labor History, 1987 28(3)
