= Mary Moultrie =

- Mary Moultrie arm in arm with Walter Reuther and Ralph Abernathy. Charleston, South Carolina, 1969.
- Born: Mary Ann Moultrie; 1943; Wadmalaw Island, South Carolina, US
- Died: April 27, 2015 (aged 71–72)
- Body discovered: South Carolina, US
- Burial place: New Jerusalem AME Church Cemetery, 6179 Bears Bluff Road, Wadmalaw Island, South Carolina
- Known for: Charleston sanitation strike
- Movement: Civil rights movement
- Children: Arnise Moultrie
- Relatives: Angie Daniels Gordon (sister); Dorothy McClair (sister); Mary Frances Judge (sister); Raymond Moultrie (brother)

Mary Moultrie (born Mary Ann Moultrie; 1943- April 27, 2015) was a nurse's aid and civil rights activist. She was elected president of the union Local 1199B, the organized workers of the Medical College hospital of the University of South Carolina, where she worked. She was one of the leaders of the Charleston sanitation strike of 1969, during the civil rights movement.

== Early life / background ==
Mary Moultrie grew up on Wadmalaw Island, South Carolina. Her father worked at the naval shipyard and her mother worked as a domestic worker and housewife. Seeing her parents struggle with the difficult situation of the black working-class, she gained first-hand knowledge of the discrimination and inequality workers confronted.

In her teenage years, Mary Moultrie worked for African American civil rights activist, Esau Jenkins. Mary learned more about the kind of leadership that would be demanded of her during the hospital workers strike while speaking at the Citizen's Committee and NAACP meetings alongside Jenkins. She also worked in his restaurant called J&P.

There, she was exposed to much of what Jenkins advocated for, such as black individuals' rights. This experience trained her for later engagements.

Mary Moultrie attended Burke High school in Charleston, South Carolina and graduated in 1960. She then enrolled at Morgan State University (MSU) in Baltimore, Maryland where she completed one semester and later left the university.

== Career ==
After graduating from Burke high a local black high school Moultrie found it difficult to find a job without an education or a degree. Moultrie's parents were not wealthy and in the 1960s, grants and loans were not available for students. Mary Moultrie had to find a way to support her family and decided to leave Charleston for Goldwater Memorial Hospital, New York where she landed a job. Through the "waiver course" which allowed her to study and work simultaneously, she was trained to become a licensed practical nurse (LPN).

She worked at Goldwater Memorial Hospital for eight years and in March 1967, she moved back to Charleston and was hired as a nurse's assistant at the Medical University of South Carolina (MUSC). She was not able to be hired as a practical nurse as her LPN was not recognized by the establishment.

After the 1969 Charleston hospital strike, Moultrie continued to work at the Medical University of South Carolina (MUSC) for six years. However working there swiftly became an inconvenience, and she took the decision to step down from her position in December 1975 to avoid further problems. She then attended Charleston College for a period of two and a half years. She began working for the city in recreation but was still met with retaliatory acts at her new workplace.

For 28 years Mary Moultrie worked as a recreation manager for the City of Charleston. In 2004, she worked as a facility manager at St. Julian Devine, a community center in Charleston, South Carolina. There, she organized recreational activities for Charleston residents, including seniors, such as after-school and athletic programs.

== Charleston Strike ==
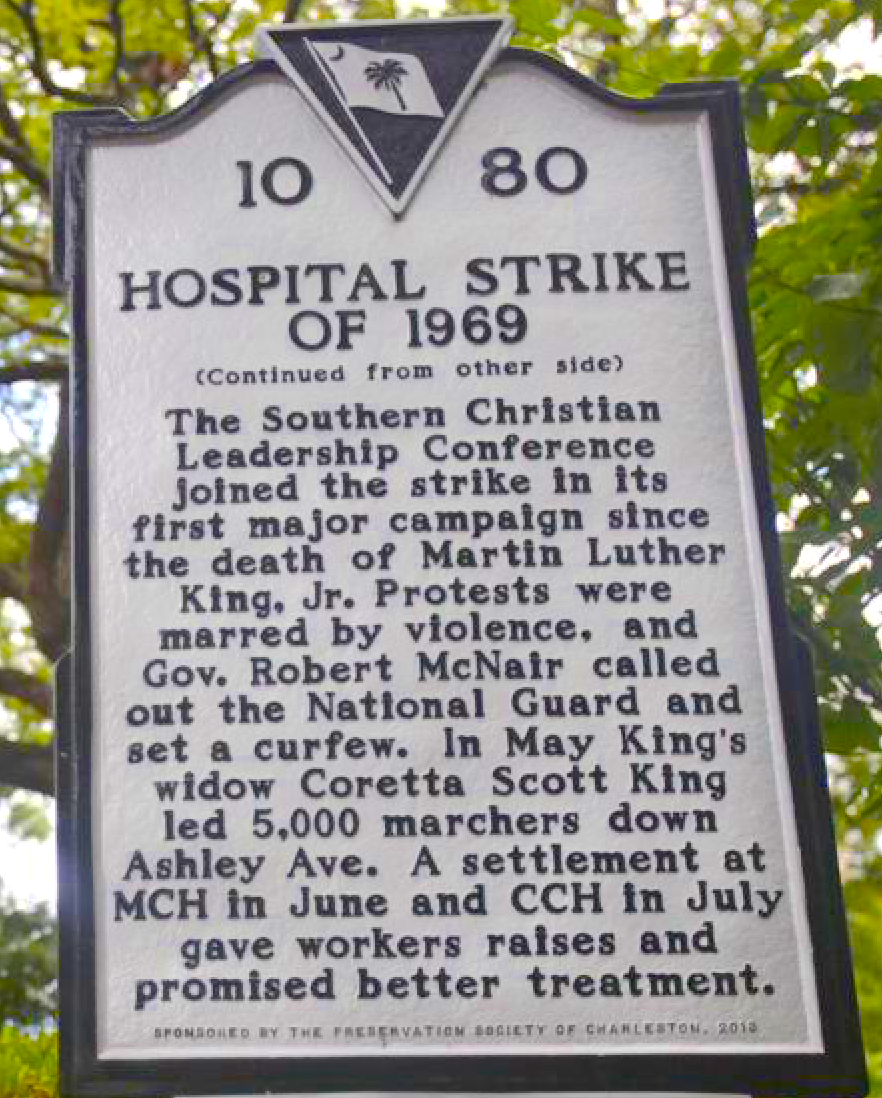
Hospital Strike Commemorative Sign in Charleston, SC

In December 1967, five nurses were fired from the Medical College Hospital (MCH) in Charleston for insubordination. They had spoken out about their restricted role in patients' care and the lack of recognition of their skills. They were denied access to patients’ charts by white nurses. Mary Moultrie helped them by contacting a community liaison with the local office of the Department of Health, Education, and Welfare (HEW) named Bill Saunders. Small groups of workers began meeting weekly at local churches, when unions were illegal. At the same time, the HEW investigated the firings and the five nurses were reinstated. After their reinstatement, workers carried on with the meetings and the number of people attending them rose up to hundreds. During these meetings they realized that they were confronted by the same discriminations from the hospital.

Faced with an unresponsive hospital administration and after attempts at negotiations, the workers realized they were in need of a national union. Following Isaiah Bennett's suggestion, they went to the Local 1199 of the Retail, Wholesale, and Department Store Workers of NYC for support. The union accepted to help them. This led to the creation of an affiliated Local 1199B Hospital and Nursing home Employees Union in Charleston, naming Mary Moultrie as their president.

On March 18, 1969, the union voted to go on a strike at MCH. The decision followed a tense encounter earlier that day, when Moultrie and her colleagues had faced a deliberately oversized anti-union front assembled by MCH president William McCord. The Charleston Strike began two days later, on March 20, 1969. During the strike, on April 22, 1969, the Southern Christian Leadership Conference held its first major march in Charleston. Mary Moultrie and Reverend Ralph David Abernathy led the procession, followed by close to 800 demonstrators. Three days later, on April 25, 1969, Mary Moultrie was arrested on the picket lines outside the Medical College of South Carolina and spent 11 days in jail. The violence that followed the arrestations, forced the city to impose a curfew and deploy the National Guard. It also led to a surge of national interest on the treatment of black workers in Charleston and the ongoing strike.

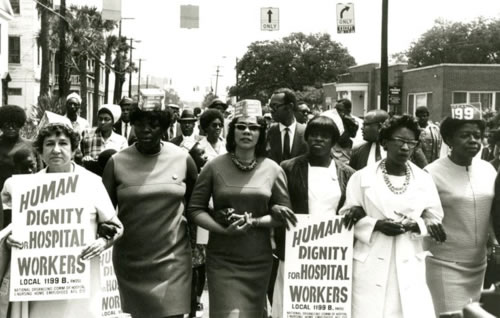
1969 Charleston Hospital Strike, March on April 30, 1969, From Left to right : Julia Davis, Mary Moultrie, Coretta Scott King, Rosetta Simmons, Juanita Abernathy, and Doris Turner.

On April 30, 1969, civil rights leader and activist Coretta Scott King joined the strike along with other well known figures such as Juanita Abernathy. Her presence helped suppress violence during the tense several months of the strike.

=== Aftermath ===
While eleven dismissed workers regained their jobs at the end of the strike, the conflict led to Mary Moultrie's resignation.

The backlash Moultrie faced after the strike pushed her away from local organizing. Former participants kept their distance from the union and avoided Moultrie.

She turned to church-based work instead, remaining largely absent from activism until 2007, when she re-engaged with Local 1199.

The YWCA of Greater Charleston awarded Moultrie the Harvey Gantt Triumph Award in 2011. In 2013, Moultrie also received the Living Legacy Award from the Association for the Study of African American Life and History (ASALH).

== See also ==
- 1969 Charleston hospital strike – Labor strike in the U.S. civil rights movement
- Charleston, South Carolina – City in South Carolina, United States
- African Americans in South Carolina
