= The Empire Hotel (New York City) =

Hotel in Manhattan, New York

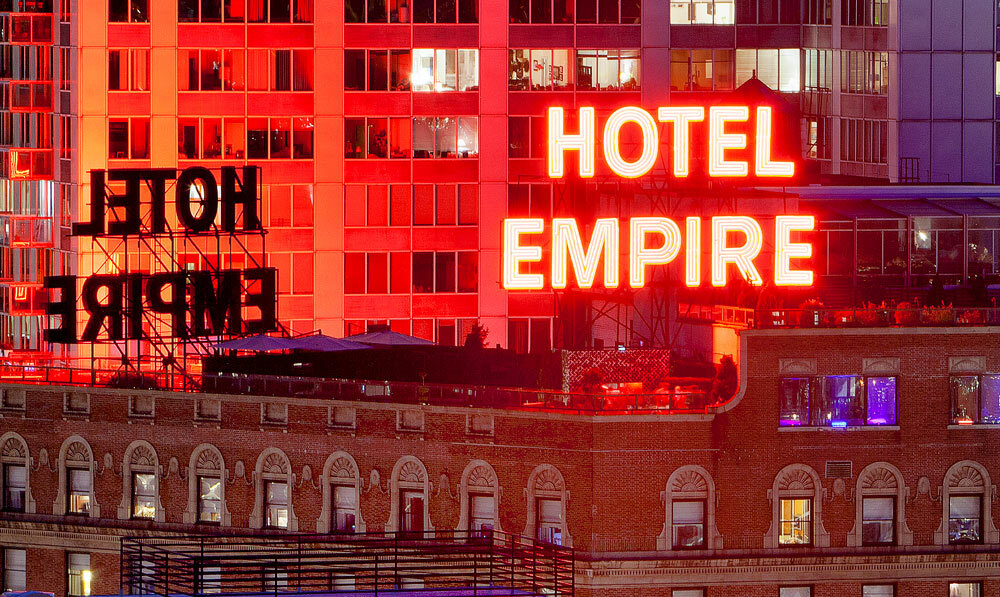
- The Empire Hotel

General information
- Location: 44 West 63rd Street, New York City
- Coordinates: 40°46′17.2″N 73°58′57.9″W
- Opening: 1922

Technical details
- Floor count: 11

Other information
- Number of rooms: 426
- Number of suites: 50
- Number of bars: 1

Website
- empirehotelnyc.com

The Empire Hotel is a boutique hotel located along West 63rd Street (at Broadway), in the New York City borough of Manhattan. The Empire Hotel has 426 guestrooms, including 50 suite

It includes the Empire Rooftop, an 8,000 square foot lounge situated atop the hotel.

== History ==
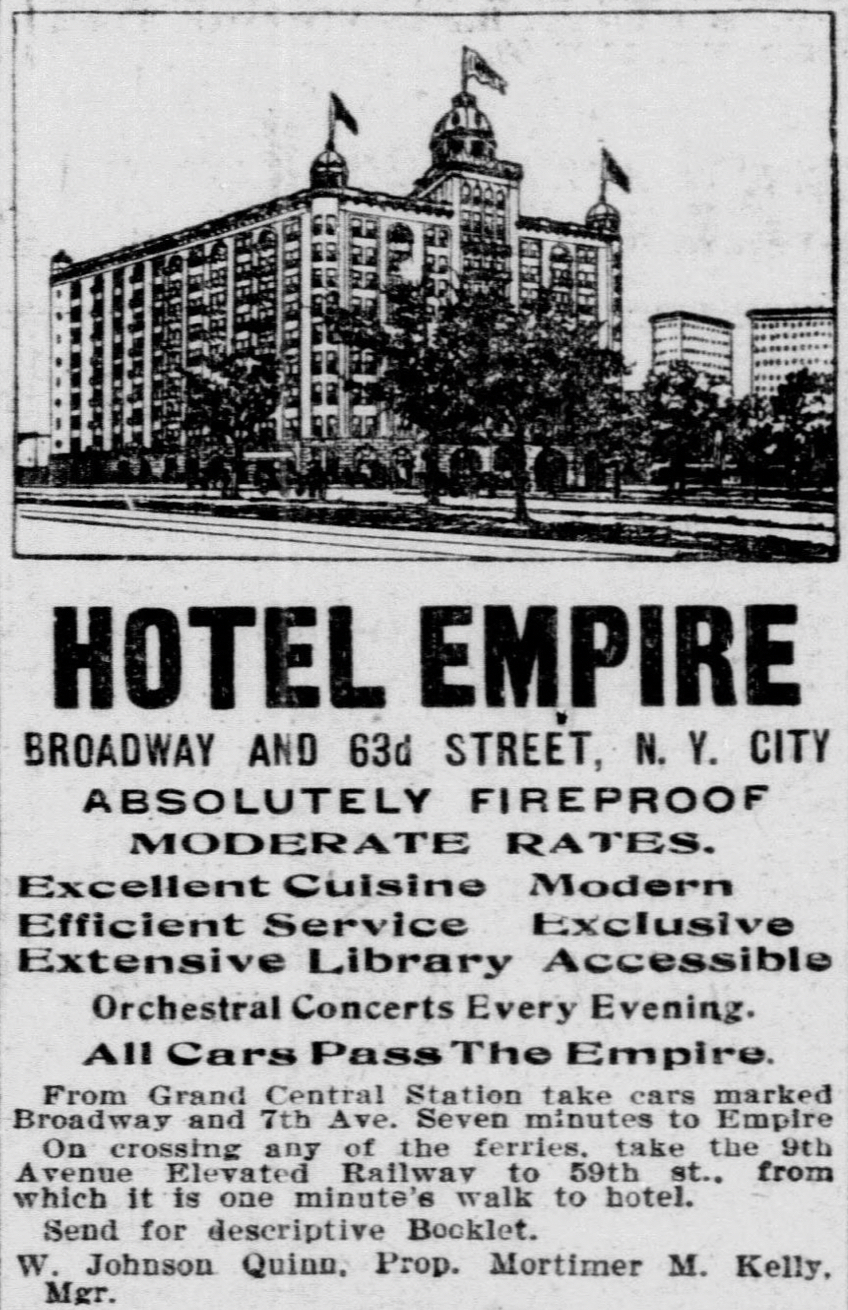
March 1902 advertisement for the first Hotel Empire that stood from 1889 to 1922

The site housed a seven-story structure, built in 1889, which Herbert DuPuy purchased in 1908. In 1922, he demolished the original building and built a 15-story structure that would become The Empire Hotel.

According to hotel historian Stanley Turkel, on December 5, 1923, The Empire Hotel opened with its enduring red neon signage reading "Hotel Empire" erected on the rooftop. Room rates in 1935: $2.00 per day – a room with private toilet and lavatory for one person; $2.50 per day – a room with private toilet and lavatory for two people; $3.00 per day – a room with private bath for one person; $3.50 per day – a room with private baths for two people; $5.00 per day – suites of parlor, bedroom and bath. Garage service in 1935: garage storage for guest car 50 cents per day, service to and from hotel 25 cents each way. The general manager in 1935 was Edward B. Bell.

In 1938, Patrick J. Murphy was hired as the resident manager. The next year, Guy P. Seeley was hired as the resident manager and Otis H. Culver was hired as assistant manager. In 1943, Daniel H. McCarriagher became the new owner. Plymouth Hotel owner Leslie L. Paul took ownership during the 1950s, and the hotel was redecorated and a new dining room was constructed on the lobby floor, along with an air-conditioned cocktail lounge and coffee shop.

The Iridium Room Jazz Club gained fame for its weekly Les Paul concerts in the basement of the hotel, where it thrived for many years.

The New York hotel remained unaltered from 1922, until it was refurbished in 2007 by interior designers Goodman Charlton.

== In popular culture ==
The Empire Hotel was featured prominently throughout The CW's teen drama series Gossip Girl, being owned by the character Chuck Bass (Ed Westwick). In January 2010, it was reported that the hotel had seen a five- to 10-percent increase in bookings due to the exposure it gained from the show. A menu with Gossip Girl-themed cocktails was also created.

The hotel was also featured in the pilot episode of the Starz crime drama series Power, where Ghost (Omari Hardwick) meets Felipe Lobos (Enrique Murciano). The hotel was also featured in three "letter hoisting" films in the 1970s for Sesame Street.

The red neon sign that shines into Kramer’s apartment in an episode of Seinfeld was inspired by the Empire Hotel's sign.

Scenes for the TV show Dexter: Resurrection were filmed on location at the hotel.
