= City Club of New York =

Organization based in New York City

- Abbreviation: CCNY
- Formation: March 1892; 134 years ago
- Founder: Edmond Kelly
- Type: Non-Profit
- Purpose: Civic advocacy, good government
- President: Layla Law-Gisiko
- Website: CityClubNY.org

The City Club of New York is an independent, not-for-profit organization based in New York City.

In 1950, The New York Times called the City Club of New York "a social club with a civic purpose" whose members "fought for adequate water supply, the extension of rapid transit lines, lower costs of foreclosure in private homes, and the merit system in civil service, [as well as] ... traffic relief, the prevention of juvenile delinquency." The City Club claimed that it inspired the creation of the Port Authority of New York and New Jersey, and also fought for minimum wage laws, city parks, and playground programs.

For 30 years the City Club of New York administered the Albert S. Bard Award for Distinguished Architecture and Urban Design, which not only conferred honors on top city buildings but also used the occasion to comment on the state of municipal architecture in general.

== History ==
The City Club was founded as a gentlemen's club in March 1892 by a group of 23 men, including such prominent names as August Belmont, Jr., James C. Carter, John Jay Chapman, R. Fulton Cutting, W. Bayard Cutting, Charles DeKay, George C. Magoun, George Haven Putnam, and John Woodruff Simpson. Spurred by international law expert Edmond Kelly (1851–1909), their mission was to:

promote social intercourse among persons specially interested in the good government of the City of New-York, in securing honesty and efficiency in the administration of city affairs, and in severing municipal from national politics. The organization will also aim to procure the election of fit persons to city offices, and will exert its influence steadily in behalf of an honest, efficient, and independent city government.

The first club president was James C. Carter. The group first met as a club in June 1892 at a dinner of about 200 men at Sherry's.

The City Club's first target was Tammany Hall; they helped the Lexow Committee probe into police corruption, and worked to elect William Lafayette Strong in 1895 as the reform mayor of New York. In 1897 the City Club helped organize the Citizens Union.

In 1913 the City Club commissioned a large boulder to commemorate the burial site of Captain Thomas Willett (died 1674), the first English mayor of New York, at Little Neck Cemetery, East Providence, Rhode Island. By the 1920s the City Club was advocating on behalf of making the city safer in areas like urban planning and transportation; they also expanded their advocacy to the State of New York as a whole. They published an annual "Murder Map," documenting the deaths of children due to traffic accidents and other unsafe urban conditions. In May 1937 the City Club bestowed its first annual "Citation for Meritorious Service" to New York City Parks Commissioner Robert Moses.

Despite their earlier commendation of Robert Moses' work, as time moved on the club opposed many of Moses' plans for the development of New York City: it successfully organized opposition to the Brooklyn-Battery Bridge project and was instrumental in the preservation of Castle Clinton. In the late 1930s and early 1940s lawyer and civic activist Albert S. Bard exercised his influence in civic and urban affairs through his work on City Club committees. The Albert S. Bard Award (see below) was later named in his honor. The City Club celebrated its 50th anniversary in May 1942; among those in attendance were New York City Mayor Fiorello H. LaGuardia, New York State Lieutenant Governor Charles Poletti, and former Governor Al Smith.

From 1962–1997, the City Club hosted roundtable luncheons, held every Friday except during the summer. Invited speakers (usually members) made presentations before the City Club. The luncheon presentations were aired live by WNYC-AM until 1987, when the station instead taped the luncheons and aired them during off-peak hours.

The City Club caused controversy In 1967 in a strongly worded article by activist Chairman I. D. Robbins about the perceived failures of the John Lindsay administration, particularly in regard to housing. Some club members objected to the article, asserting that it did not represent the official City Club position. Robbins offered to resign but was not allowed to.

In 1973, the City Club of New York celebrated its 80th anniversary with a gala dinner at the New York Hilton. Attendees included New York Mayor John Lindsay and former Mayor Robert F. Wagner (both of whom had been heavily criticized by the City Club at various times). At the gala, the City Club handed out 23 "For New York" awards to citizens who dedicated themselves to bettering the city. Recipients included John Chancellor, Walter Cronkite, Lloyd Goodrich, Ada Louise Huxtable, Willie Mays, Arthur Mitchell, Bess Myerson, John Bertram Oakes, Joseph Papp, I. M. Pei, Dorothy Schiff, Neil Simon, Preston Robert Tisch, and Lila Bell Wallace.

In 1984 the City Club elected Sally Goodgold as its first female president; she was noted for her ability to attract high-profile names to the Club's weekly luncheon speaker series.

The club suspended activities in 2003. In 2013 the club hired a new president, Michael S. Gruen, and resumed its role of civic advocacy, taking on New York City Mayor Michael Bloomberg's East Midtown rezoning plans.

In 2018, the City Club sued to stop construction of Little Island at Pier 55, which led to the plans for the park being scrapped. The park was later built after the state added funds.

In 2023, the City Club elected Layla Law-Gisiko president.

== Clubhouse ==
The Club's first headquarters, located at 677 Fifth Avenue, was secured in October 1892.

By the early 1900s, the City Club commissioned its own clubhouse at 55 West 44th Street, which was designed by architect Austin W. Lord and erected in 1904. After 40 years at that location, in 1944 the club moved to the Hotel Russell at 45 Park Avenue. (The 44th Street structure is now the City Club Hotel.)

== Membership ==
In 1892 the club's membership was more than 650 men, and by 1904, membership was 667 (including 195 lawyers, 61 bankers, 31 doctors, 28 stockbrokers, 26 editors and writers, and 13 clergymen).

By 1950, City Club membership was down to 200 men and the club had been unsuccessful at recruiting a new generation of civic-minded applicants. In February 1950 they voted to disband, stating that the work they had been doing should be "entrusted to the Citizens Union ..., which has the staff to carry on...." Shortly thereafter, however, the club was revived with an influx of younger men, and it vowed to continue its work.

In 1969, club membership was about 200 men, but had increased to about 400 in 1973.

In 1974, the City Club of New York opened its membership to women.

In 2011, the City Club had 450 members.

== Club officers ==
Notable City Club of New York officers, past and present

=== Presidents ===
- 1906–1909 George McAneny
- 1930–1942 Richard S. Childs
- 1956–1958 Theodore R. Kupferman — later became a New York City Councilman
- 1966–c. 1969 — Stanley Turkel

=== Chairmen ===
- 1911–1944 Joseph M. Price — key organizer of the Fusion Executive Committee, which in 1913 succeeded in electing John Purroy Mitchel mayor of New York, defeating the Tammany Hall candidate
- 1979–1989 Stanley Turkel

== Albert S. Bard Award ==
The Albert S. Bard Award (full name Albert S. Bard Award for Distinguished Architecture and Urban Design) created in 1962 and administered by the City Club, honored those who helped enrich the intellectual and cultural life of the community through architecture and urban design. The award was conceived by City Club member architect Leon Brand, who envisioned "an architectural prize intended to raise the standard of excellence for building design in New York City."

The Bard Award was born into controversy when the City Club refused to present any awards in its inaugural year, claiming that they were unable to find "a single work of civic architecture created in the city since 1958 worthy" of the award. The New York chapter of the American Institute of Architects sharply criticized the City Club for this pronouncement.

For many years, the Bard Awards were distributed on alternate years for public and private buildings. Top awards were deemed "First Honor;" those that didn't reach such a high level were called "Merit Awards." Award juries were composed of a rotating group of top architects and urban planners, as well as City Club of New York officers.

The City Club stopped presenting the Albert S. Bard Award in the early 1990s; winners included:

- 1963: No winners selected
- 1964: Pepsi-Cola Corporation World Headquarters — designed by Skidmore, Owings & Merrill
- 1966: Jacob Kaplan — for civic work; keynote speech by New York City Mayor John Lindsay
- 1967: Chatham Towers (Manhattan) — designed by Kelly and Gruzen
- 1967: Lower Manhattan Plan (Manhattan) — designed by Wallace McHarg Roberts & Todd (WMRT)
- 1967: University Village (Manhattan) — designed by James Ingo Freed and I. M. Pei
- 1968: Ford Foundation Building
- 1968: Paley Park (Manhattan)
- 1968: Whitney Museum of American Art (Manhattan)
- 1970: Concert halls, Juilliard School (Manhattan) — designed by Pietro Belluschi
- 1970: MUSE, Bedford Lincoln Neighborhood Museum (Brooklyn) — designed by Hardy Holzman Pfeiffer
- 1971: Graduate Center Mall, City University of New York (Manhattan) — designed by Carl J. Petrilli
- 1971: Technology Building II, New York University (Manhattan) — designed by Marcel Breuer and Hamilton Smith
- 1972: National Airlines Terminal, John F. Kennedy International Airport (Queens) — designed by I. M. Pei & Partners
- 1972: Residential Building, Henry Ittleson Center for Child Research (Bronx) — designed by Abraham W. Geller
- 1973: Bed-Stuy Community Pool (Brooklyn) — designed by Alan Lapidus
- 1973: Bronx State Hospital Rehabilitation Center (Bronx) — designed by Gruzen and Partners
- 1973: East Midtown Plaza (Manhattan) — designed by Davis, Brody & Associates
- 1973: Twin Parks Northeast Housing (Bronx) — designed by Richard Meier & Partners
- 1975: Salanter Akiba Riverdale Academy (Bronx) — designed by Caudill Rowlett Scott
- 1975: Waterside Plaza (Manhattan) — designed by Davis, Brody & Associates
- 1975: TKTS booth, Times Square (Manhattan) — designed by Mayers & Schiff Associates
- 1976: 1199 Plaza (East Harlem) — designed by Hodne/Stageberg Partners
- 1976: Arts for Living Center, Henry Street Settlement (Manhattan) — designed by Prentice and Chan, Olhausen
- 1977: Bronx Development Center (Bronx) — designed by Richard Meier & Partners
- 1977: Roosevelt Island Complex (Manhattan) — developed by New York State Urban Development Corporation
- 1977: Sherman Fairchild Center for the Life Sciences
- 1978: Citicorp Center
- 1981: No winners selected
- 1982: No winners selected

== Distinguished New Yorker Award ==
In 1967, in honor of their 75th anniversary, the City Club began presenting Distinguished New Yorker awards to a deserving citizen or citizens. The award presentation was often attended by the current New York City mayor. Recipients included:

- 1967: 17 recipients, including Roger N. Baldwin, Detlev Bronk, Cass Canfield, Kenneth Clark, Duke Ellington, Martha Graham, Alvin Saunders Johnson, Robert Moses, A. Philip Randolph, David Sarnoff, Whitney North Seymour, Arthur Hays Sulzberger, and Austin Tobin
- 1969: Jacob Potofsky, president of the Amalgamated Clothing Workers of America
- 1970: Mary Lasker, head of the Lasker Foundation — first time individual award given to a woman
- 1972: Andrew Heiskell, chairman of Time Inc.
- 1976: Charles Bluhdorn, head of Gulf and Western Industries

The City Club Distinguished New Yorker award is not related to the Real Estate Board of New York's Harry B. Helmsley Distinguished New Yorker Award, which was established in 1992.

== Publications ==
- Mayor Low's Administration in New York. City Club of New York (1903).
- New York City Transit: A Memorandum Addressed to the Public Service Commission of the First District. City Club of New York. 1907.

== See also ==
- Women's City Club of New York
