= 2014 Tacoma nurses' strike =

Strike in the United States

The SEIU Healthcare 1199NW strike of 2014 was a 24-hour strike called by the Service Employees Union healthcare Local 1199NW. The strike was begun on Tuesday, November 18, 2014, at 7:00 A.M. There were 1,100 workers at two Pierce County hospitals operated by CHI Franciscan Health in Tacoma who participated in the strike event. The two hospitals are St. Joseph Medical Center in Tacoma and St. Clare Hospital in Lakewood. Nurse assistants, licensed practical nurses, unit secretaries, dietary workers, housekeepers, sterile processors, technical workers and other services of the two hospitals walked off the job to participate in the strike. The strike did not include nurses and doctors. The union members were demanding CHI Franciscan Health to improve wages, improve on health care, improve on their charity care policy, and end unfair labor practices.

== Background ==
=== CHI Franciscan Health ===
CHI Franciscan Health is a non-profit organization based in Tacoma. The organization affiliated with national non-profit Catholic Health initiatives based in Colorado. The Franciscan Foundation was established in 1986 to receive charitable gifts and funds made on CHI Franciscan Health. According to CHI Franciscan Health, 100 percent of contribution to the foundations will goes directly to programs and accounts that were designed to help their communities and patients. Furthermore, CHI Franciscan Health promises to provide equal opportunity to their employees regarding their employees' race, color, religion, gender, sexual orientation, national origin, age, disability or veteran status. They are also a member of the Washington State Hospital Association.

=== SEIU Local 1199NW ===
Service Employees International Union Healthcare Local 1199NW, also known as Local 1199NW, is an independent organization founded in 1983. The organization was formed by a group of nurses at Group Puget Sound. They organized a union with 1199-Hospital and health Care Employees Union, also known as 1199SEIU. 1199SEIU was founded by pharmacists and drug clerks in New York 1932. It was the first and largest health workers' union in the United States. Local 1199NW is also a part of the 2.1 million members of Service Employees International Union. The Local 1199NW and other organizations that they take part in are fighting for their union members for their equality and ended the unfair labor practices in their labor force. The organization has more than 26,000 members that are nurses and healthcare workers across Washington state.

== Strike timeline ==
=== Before the strike ===
Before the strike occurred on November 18, 2014, the union members of Union Health Care Local 1199 NW had been bargaining their contract with CHI Franciscan Health since June 2013. The union members were demanding better wages, improved health care, and ending of unfair labor practices. According to the workers of the hospitals, the hospital had cut 10% of staff members, even though the hospital had the same number of patients. The workers had to work over time, but their pay check did not increase. Moreover, the employees could not afford the health care plan that was provided by the company. In Q13 Fox, union member Jennifer Storm said, "We have employees at the hospital that are in debt and have creditors for being cared for by CHI and so that's a big issue". It was opposite to what CHI Franciscan Health promised them. CHI Francisco promised to provide better health care for them, but the healthcare plan cost more than what that their employees and their families could afford. They also said CHI Franciscan was cutting back their employees' benefits and funds from the two hospitals in Tacoma and sending the profit to CHI based in Denver, Colorado.

Furthermore, the members of SEIU Local 1199NW showed their support to their patients and their community. They were calling for increasing investment in frontline caregiver, a charity care policy that keeps patients out of debt. The union says CHI Franciscan health made a $165 million profit in 2013, while cutting its commitment to their patient cares. Patients that could not afford to pay for their hospital bills were not being cared for by CHI Franciscan. The health care workers of the hospital felt that they should give back to their community by standing up for their clients and demanding the CHI to improve their charity care policy.

However, their bargaining sessions with CHI Franciscan Health were not ending with the resolution that they wanted to have. A session of negotiation with CHI Franciscan on Wednesday 12, 2014 ended at 8 P.M with no resolution. It was frustrating the community and the members of Local 1199NW that their negotiation with the CHI Franciscan Health employers did not come to the agreement. Therefore, the union members had no alternative action but to go on strike and stand up for themselves, their patients, and their community. The workers notified CHI Franciscan one week before the strike day that they intended to strike. According to Taft-Hartley Act, the union members required by law to give the hospital notice to ensure patients are not affected.

As for CHI Franciscan Health, they were recognizing the raising concern of the union. According to CHI Franciscan Health, they said they was working in addressing the concern of the union, including being more clear in its communication with their patients and employees. They also said they were working in finding and giving the options to help their clients to pay their bills. The company expected the strike and was prepared for it. In Q13 Fox, Thomas, the spokesman of CHI Franciscan, said in the interview, "We're going to deploy other staff from our other facilities to both hospitals to fill those position and other positions. Where we have needs, we will contract with other agencies to fill up those gaps". The company made sure that the patients do not feel effected by the strike.

=== Strike begins ===
On Tuesday, November 18, 2014, 1,100 workers from two Pierce County hospitals operated by CHI Franciscan Health walked out the job. There were 800 nursing assistants, licensed practical nurses, unit secretaries, dietary workers, housekeepers, sterile processors, technical workers and other service workers from St. Joseph Medical Center in Tacoma, WA and another 300 workers from St. Clare Hospital in Lakewood, WA were striking. The strike, however, did not include doctors and nurses. The strike began at 7:00 A.M and would last 24 hours. The strike called by Service Employees International Union Healthcare Local 1199NW. The members of SEIU Local 1199NW were holding signs and protesting in front of the two hospitals.

== Aftermath ==
After months of negotiating and calling for CHI Franciscan to invest in Tacoma patient and a public hearing, the workers at St. Joseph and St. Clare hospitals, including 1,100 workers that went on strike on November 18, 2014, signed their new contract at 8 P.M Tuesday, January 27, 2015, with the company. The new contract included: improved staffing and wage and benefit improvement. The union was succeeding in stopping CHI Franciscan corporation from taking health money from Pierce County. The resulted of the new agreement are strengthen labor management partnership in determining staffing, an increased investment in worker's retirement, wage increases, and a management commitment to transparency in the matter of employees' qualification for charity care financial assistance to meet their families' healthcare needs. For the workers, their new contract means that they can worry less about supporting their families. Also, the workers can now concentrate on taking care of their patients.
