= Peter B. Cotton =

British gastroenterologist

- Born: Herefordshire, England, UK
- Education: Cambridge University, Middlesex Hospital (residency)
- Known for: ERCP
- Awards: Fellow of the Royal College of Surgeons (2002)

Peter B. Cotton (born 1939) is a British gastroenterologist.

Cotton was born in England, where his father was a rural family physician. He was educated at Cambridge University and St. Thomas Hospital Medical School (London), where he graduated in 1963. In 1986, he left England to become Professor of Medicine and Chief of Endoscopy at Duke University, Durham, North Carolina, where he established a endoscopy center. In 1994 he transferred to the Medical University of South Carolina, where he established the Digestive Disease Center.

Cotton has written at least 10 books, including “Practical Gastrointestinal Endoscopy” (co-authored by Christopher Williams).
