= Medical University of South Carolina =

Public medical school in Charleston, South Carolina, US

- Other name: MUSC
- Former names: Medical College of South Carolina (1824–1832), Medical College of the State of South Carolina (1832–1952), Medical College of South Carolina (1952–1969)
- Motto: Auget Largiendo (Latin)
- Motto in English: She enriches by giving generously.
- Type: Public medical and research university
- Established: 1824; 202 years ago
- Founder: South Carolina General Assembly
- Accreditation: SACSCOC
- Affiliations: SCAHEC
- Academic affiliations: SCRA; Sea-grant; Space-grant
- Endowment: $594.4 million (2025)
- President: David J. Cole
- Provost: Lisa K. Saladin
- Faculty: 1,848
- Students: 3,240
- Undergraduates: 334
- Postgraduates: 2,906
- Location: Charleston, South Carolina, 29425, US; 32°47′3″N 79°57′3″W
- Campus: 50 acres (20 ha); Midsize City
- Newspaper: MUSC Catalyst
- Colors: Black and gold
- Website: musc.edu

The Medical University of South Carolina (MUSC) is a public medical school in Charleston, South Carolina, United States. It opened in 1824 as a small private college aimed at training physicians and has since established hospitals and medical facilities across the state. It is one of the oldest continually operating schools of medicine in the United States and the oldest in the Deep South.

The school has expanded into a state university with a medical center and six colleges for the education of health professionals, biomedical scientists, and other health care personnel. It also operates as a center for research and has a public hospital.

== Colleges ==
=== College of Medicine ===
==== History ====
The College of Medicine began in 1823 with the incorporation of the Medical College of South Carolina, a private institution of the Medical Society of South Carolina. Seven Charleston physicians formed the initial faculty with 30 students enrolled in 1824. The first graduation was on April 4, 1825. With the exception of the American Civil War, the college has served continuously to the present, even when there was a total enrollment of two students.

At the time of Robert Wilson's appointment as dean of the College of Medicine in 1908, Abraham Flexner was beginning his survey of the medical college. Flexner's survey resulted in the report titled "Medical Education in the United States and Canada". It was highly critical of the medical college and its poor facilities, lack of full-time faculty, lack of equipment, and lack of money. Recognizing that the college did not meet national requirements, Wilson determined that the only way to save the college from closure was to transfer it to state ownership in order to have access to state appropriations. The state took over formal control of the college in 1913.

In 1969, twelve African Americans were fired from the hospital, resulting in a two-month-long strike and protest that gathered as many as 10,000 participants, including influential leaders such as Coretta Scott King.

==== Degree programs ====
The College of Medicine offers a four-year medical curriculum leading to a Doctor of Medicine (M.D.). The college also offers dual-degree programs in conjunction with other colleges and universities. The Colleges of Medicine and Graduate Studies offer a combined M.D./Ph.D degree through the Medical Scientist Training Program as well as an M.D./master's degree in clinical research through the Southeastern Predoctoral Training in clinical research. Students can also receive a combined M.D./M.H.A. through the Colleges of Medicine and Health Professions. The college partners with the University of South Carolina and The Citadel to provide an M.D./master's in Public Health and M.D./master's of Business Administration, respectively.

The college accepts approximately 180 students per year into the medical curriculum. The curriculum consists of two years of core basic science instruction followed by two years of clinical training. Students also participate in a longitudinal curriculum that includes instruction in doctoring, physical examination and diagnosis, and biomedical ethics. In 2024, the MD program had 3,680 applicants of which 186 students were enrolled from 52 colleges and seven states, with enrolled students having a mean 3.86 GPA and a 511 MCAT score.

=== College of Pharmacy ===
The Department of Pharmacy was created by an amendment to the charter in 1881, organized in 1882, and discontinued by 1884. Resuming in 1894, the Department of Pharmacy offered the Graduate in Pharmacy (Ph.G.) degree. The current program offers the Doctor of Pharmacy (PharmD) degree. In 2006, the College of Pharmacy merged with the University of South Carolina's College of Pharmacy in Columbia, SC to form the South Carolina College of Pharmacy (SCCP). However, in 2016 the College of Pharmacy at MUSC ended its merger with SCCP. Members of the graduating class of 2020 were the first to receive degrees under the newly separated MUSC College of Pharmacy.

The MUSC College of Pharmacy offers a dual PharmD/MBA program, a consortium between The Citadel Graduate College and MUSC College of Pharmacy. This consortium was originally designed and implemented before the SCCP was formed.

=== College of Nursing ===
The two-year training course for nurses was started in 1884 at Roper Hospital. The training school was incorporated into the Medical College of South Carolina in 1919 and expanded to three years. Today, the College of Nursing offers a Bachelor of Science in nursing, a Master of Science in nursing, and three doctoral degrees – a PhD (Doctor of Philosophy), and a DNP (Doctor of Nursing Practice).

=== College of Graduate Studies ===
Graduate instruction began in 1949, with the first Master of Science degree conferred in 1951 and the first Doctor of Philosophy awarded in 1952. The School of Graduate Studies, formally organized in 1965, now offers a variety of programs including neuroscience, biostatistics, biomedical data science, epidemiology, molecular and cellular biology, pathology and laboratory medicine, pharmacology, pharmaceutical sciences, microbiology and immunology, and environmental sciences.

=== College of Dental Medicine ===
The School of Dental Medicine was authorized in 1953 at the request of the South Carolina Dental Association. Funding delayed the school until 1964. The first class received DMD degrees in 1971.

MUSC recently completed construction of a new, clinical education facility: The James B. Edwards Dental Clinics Building.

=== College of Health Professions ===
Three hospital-based training programs (Medical Technology, Cytotechnology, and Radiologic Technology) became the nucleus of a Division of Technical Training, recognized as a separate branch of the Medical College in 1964. The School of Allied Health Sciences, now the College of Health Professions, was formally organized in 1966, and expanded to offer over 20 different training options in the paramedical field. The college now offers baccalaureate, masters, and doctoral degree programs.

== MUSC Foundation ==
The Medical University of South Carolina (MUSC) Foundation was chartered in 1966 as a charitable, educational foundation to support the education, research, patient care and other programs at the Medical University. Most gifts to MUSC are handled by the foundation, which ensures that benefactors receive proper acknowledgment. Gifts of all sizes and types are accepted from alumni, parents and friends of the university as well as corporations and foundations.

== Hospitals ==
As MUSC Health the university maintains several hospitals.

=== MUSC Health University Medical Center ===
The Medical College of South Carolina was one of the first medical schools in the United States to establish, in 1834, an infirmary specifically for teaching purposes. In the 1840s the college also entered into agreements for clinical training opportunities at the Poorhouse, the Marine Hospital, and the local "dispensary." In 1856, Roper Hospital was opened, and for 100 years Roper was the Medical College's primary teaching hospital.

The Medical College recognized the need for its own facilities to expand clinical teaching opportunities, as well as to serve as a major referral center in South Carolina for diagnosis and treatment of disease. The ten-story Medical University Hospital accepted its first patients in 1955. In 1985 the name of the hospital and its clinics was changed to MUSC Health Medical Center, reflecting its function in an academic health institution and its wide range of services to the public. This comprehensive facility now consists of three separate hospitals (the University Hospital, the Institute of Psychiatry, and the Children's Hospital). The Medical Center includes centers for specialized care (Heart Center, Transplantation Center, Hollings Cancer Center, Digestive Diseases Center). Numerous outpatient facilities include the Family Medicine Center, University Diagnostic Center, and affiliated faculty practice association ambulatory care centers. In the past ten years, $200 million in capital improvements for the Medical Center focused resources on improved quality of patient care and accessibility of services. In 1993–94 there were over 23,000 inpatient admissions and almost 300,000 outpatient visits.

In 1994, Peter B. Cotton formed the Digestive Disease Center at the Medical University of South Carolina. The center specializes in the management and treatment of digestive diseases. In 2012, it was the first hospital in South Carolina to perform the new LINX Reflux Management System treatment for patients with GERD.

=== MUSC Shawn Jenkins Children's Hospital ===
MUSC Shawn Jenkins Children's Hospital is a nationally ranked, freestanding acute care women's and children's hospital in Charleston, South Carolina. It is affiliated with the Medical University of South Carolina. The hospital features all private rooms that consist of 250 pediatric beds and 29 beds for women. The hospital provides comprehensive pediatric specialties and subspecialties to infants, children, teens, and young adults aged 0–21 throughout the Carolinas. The hospital also sometimes treats adults that require pediatric care. The hospital has a rooftop helipad and is an ACS verified level I pediatric trauma center, the only one in South Carolina. The hospital features a regional pediatric intensive-care unit and an American Academy of Pediatrics verified level IV neonatal intensive care unit.

Along with the main hospital in Charleston, MUSC Children's operates the ambulatory R. Keith Summey Medical Pavilion with 4 operating rooms and 2 procedure rooms.

=== Others ===
MUSC completed the purchase of four South Carolina hospitals in March 2019. Chester Regional Medical Center in Chester, with 82 beds, became MUSC Health Chester Medical Center. Springs Memorial Hospital in Lancaster, with 225 beds, became MUSC Health Lancaster Medical Center. Carolinas Hospital System - Florence, with 396 beds, became MUSC Health Florence Medical Center. Carolinas Hospital System - Marion, with 124 beds, became MUSC Health Marion Medical Center and is located on U.S. 76 in Mullins.

The MUSC board voted to acquire Kershaw Health's hospitals and Providence Hospitals in 2021. The hospitals had their names changed, and are now in MUSC Health.

== University status and rankings ==
Until 1950, the college was headed by a dean, with the schools headed by directors. In 1950, the title of the school's chief executive was changed to president, with the six schools headed by deans. In 1969, the state legislature elevated the Medical College to university status. By this act it established MUSC as the state's only free standing academic health sciences center, and one of the few institutions of its kind in the nation.

In 1970, the six schools of the university were designated as colleges, each with its separate administration and faculty organization. Each college awards appropriate degrees along standard academic lines connected with its educational activities. All professional education programs, and the MUSC Medical Center, are accredited by the appropriate professional accrediting agency.

In 2025, U.S. News & World Report ranked the university's medical college Tier 2 in Best Medical Schools: Research, and Tier 2 in Best Medical Schools: Primary Care, out of four medical school Tiers.

== South Carolina Area Health Education Consortium ==
One of the most pressing problems in health care delivery and disease prevention across the nation is in the distribution of health professionals. The Medical University serves as the "home" institution for the South Carolina Area Health Education Consortium (AHEC), a statewide consortium of teaching hospitals and rural health education centers. As Dean of the Medical University of South Carolina from 1971 to 1974, J. F. A. McManus provided the impetus for the establishment, with area hospital leaders, of a consortium of statewide hospitals for undergraduate and postgraduate medical education. Since 1972 South Carolina AHEC has influenced the education, supply, retention, and geographic distribution of health care professionals statewide, particularly in smaller, underserved communities. South Carolina AHEC programs include undergraduate and graduate level medical education, nursing, allied health, pharmacy and dental education, as well as all family practice residency programs in the state. South Carolina AHEC maintains partnerships between the university and communities across the state, as evidenced by more than 200 full-time faculty members and hundreds more part-time and consulting faculty who teach in South Carolina AHEC programs in virtually every county of the state.

== Growth since 1963 ==
In the 93 years since the Medical University became a state institution, its growth was gradual up to the 1940s and phenomenal since then, particularly in the past 40 years. Student enrollments have jumped from 571 in 1965 to almost 2,500 students in the fall of 2006 (not including post doctoral residents in medicine, dental medicine and pharmacy); the full-time faculty has grown from approximately 200 to over 1,000 (including approximately 500 FTE teaching faculty). The library has more than 200,000 bound volumes, approximately 12,600 E-journal subscriptions, and a vast array of online databases & knowledgebases.

More than $200,000,000 of extramural grant awards were received by MUSC in the 2009–2010 fiscal year. Expansion in enrollments and programs has been made possible by ambitious programs of physical plant development that have seen the institution grow from one building in 1913 to a 76-acre (30.8 ha) medical complex, with more than 89 buildings. Among the many buildings added to the campus was the historic old Charleston Arsenal, acquired in 1963. Since 1985, nine new buildings have been constructed: East Wing and Children's Hospital (1986), Institute of Psychiatry (1988), North Tower (1993), Harper Student Center (1993), Hollings Cancer Center (1993), The Strom Thurmond Biomedical Research Center and the Gazes Cardiac Institute (1997) in cooperation with the VA Hospital, Charles P. Darby Children's Research Institute (2005), Ashley-Rutledge Parking Garage (2005), and Ashley River Tower (2008). In addition there have been major renovation/addition projects including Storm Eye Institute expansion (1998), Rutledge Tower Ambulatory Care Facility renovation (1998), College of Health Professions Complex (2005), Hollings Cancer Center Tower expansion (2005), and Colcock Hall (2005–2006). The growth of the campus has been made possible, at times, by the demolition of historic properties such as the c. 1820s Bennett Mill's overseer's house at 76 Barre Street, demolished in 1977 to make way for a parking lot.

The Drug Discovery & Bioengineering Building, part of the James E. Clyburn Research Center, was completed in 2011. This building began a new chapter in South Carolina as it created 78 labs and other facilities to improve biomedical research efforts. The Bioengineering building and the work it will do are in collaboration with Clemson University and the University of South Carolina.

== MUSC Catalyst News ==
MUSC Catalyst News is the name of both the digital and print sources of news from the Medical University of South Carolina. It is published by the MUSC Office of Public Affairs and Media Relations.

== Notable people ==
- Annie Andrews, pediatrician and politician
- Rose Delores Gibbs, first female African American doctor to graduate from MUSC and the first black woman to serve as the chief medical officer in the Peace Corps
- Mary Moultrie, nurse's aid and civil rights activist who was elected president of the union Local 1199B, the organized workers of the university's hospital
- Nolan R. Williams, neuropsychiatrist who helped develop SAINT-TMS
