= 1199 Plaza =

Housing project in New York City

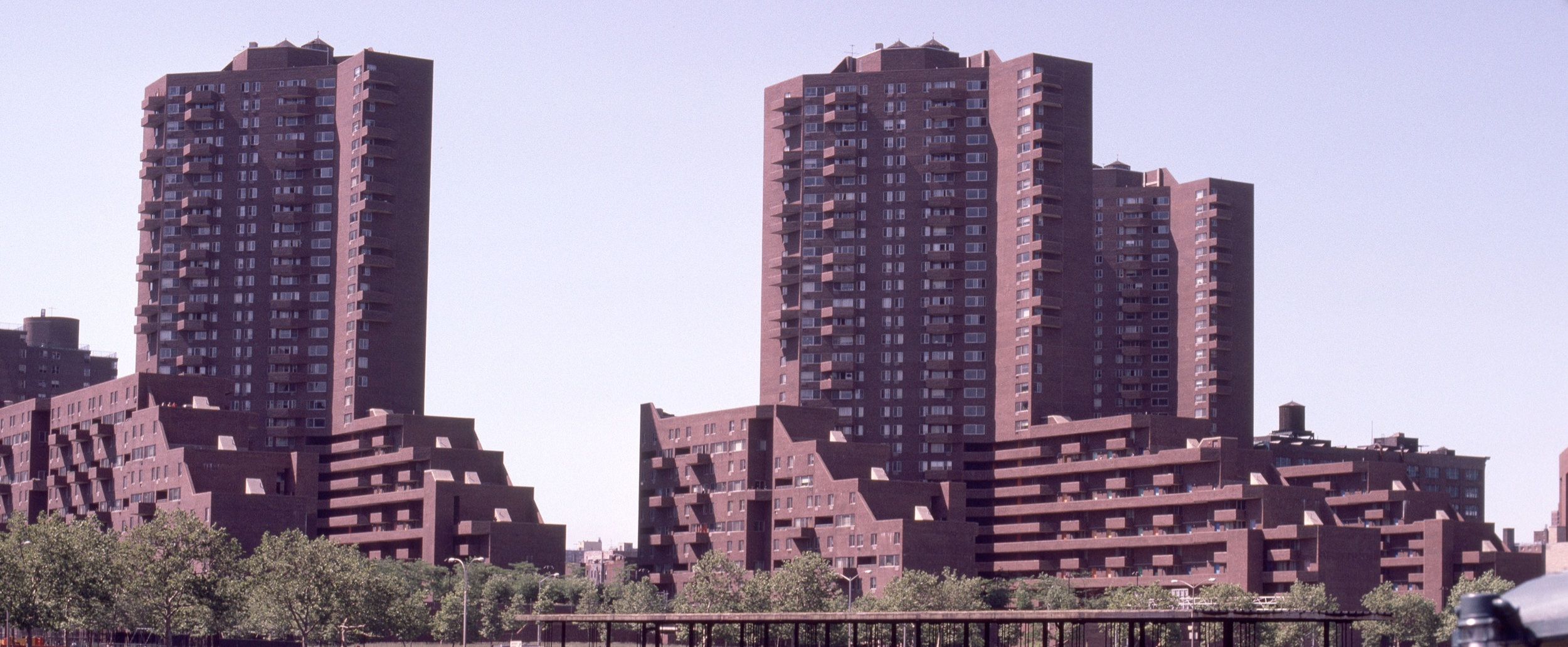
- The 1199 Plaza, as seen from across the East River, in the early 1970s
- Interactive map of the 1199 Plaza area

General information
- Status: Completed
- Type: Mitchell–Lama Housing Program housing cooperative
- Location: First Avenue in East Harlem, New York City
- Coordinates: 40°47′28″N 73°56′16″W
- Construction started: 1970
- Opened: 1974

Design and construction
- Architects: Thomas Hodne and Herb Baldwin
- Main contractor: The Hodne/Stageberg Partners, Inc.

The 1199 Plaza is a housing cooperative in East Harlem.

Located on First Avenue, on the western bank of the East River, the 1199 Plaza consists of four 31-story towers, joined by mid-rise units which extend toward the riverbank. 1199 Plaza opened in 1974, as a low-to-middle income housing complex.

The 1199 Plaza traces its origin to the 1199 union, which consisted mainly of female lower-income hospital workers. The 1199 union members wanted housing that was safe, affordable, and socially inclusive. Hodne/Stageberg Partners, Inc served as the architects of the project, while Ruberoid supplied building materials.

In the 1990s, the 1199 Plaza began offering housing for non-HUD applicants. A new title, East River Landing, was adopted. The 1199 Plaza has thus become a hybrid project, housing both middle-income and higher-income applicants, in addition to poorer residents.

The 1199 Plaza has been described as a "city within a city", owing to its sheer scale and unique design. Several prominent figures in the entertainment industry have resided at the 1199, including Damon Dash, the founder of Roc-a-Fella records, Cam'ron, and Shari Bryant.

== Background ==
The 1199 Plaza traces its roots to organizing led by the 1199 union, a hospital worker's union that consisted primarily of women of color. Housing was a top priority for 1199 union members, who wanted to integrate in to an existing community rather than to develop exclusionary housing for union members only. The union's leader, Leon J. Davis had initially planned to integrate the 1199 union members in to a predominantly White, middle-class neighborhood, but by the time funding had been secured for the project, the increasingly non-White, working-class East Harlem neighborhood had been selected.

== Development ==
In 1963, the Ruberoid company sponsored a competition for the design of a subsidized housing project along an uninhabited strip of the East River. The project was envisioned by architect Thomas Hodne, the New York City Hall, and the Local 1199 union. The housing project model was still considered a viable path to revitalization in the 1960s.

At the outset, the project would consist of densely situated six story buildings with an open street grid. However, the project's sponsor rejected this plan. Many members of the Local 1199 Union already lived in such housing, and felt that it lacked sunlight, security, and views of the East River enjoyed by middle-class and luxury high-rise housing.

In 1968, a new hybrid plan was agreed upon by the architects and the union. The project would consist of four towers, each 32 stories tall, with 1,594 housing units. These structures would be joined by mid-rise units with a stepped-slope construction which extended toward the riverbank, giving the complexes a distinctive "U"-shape. The development would include storefronts, health and daycare centers, a meeting hall, a gym, and a pool. Excellent views of the river, as well as abundant sunlight, were afforded by the design of this complex.

Funding for the 1199 Plaza came primarily from the New York State Mitchell-Lama Housing Program, however, federal and local funds were also acquired. Women played an outsized role in the project's development. It took four years to construct at a cost of $80 million.

The total area of the 1199 Plaza complex is 12 acres.

== Completion ==
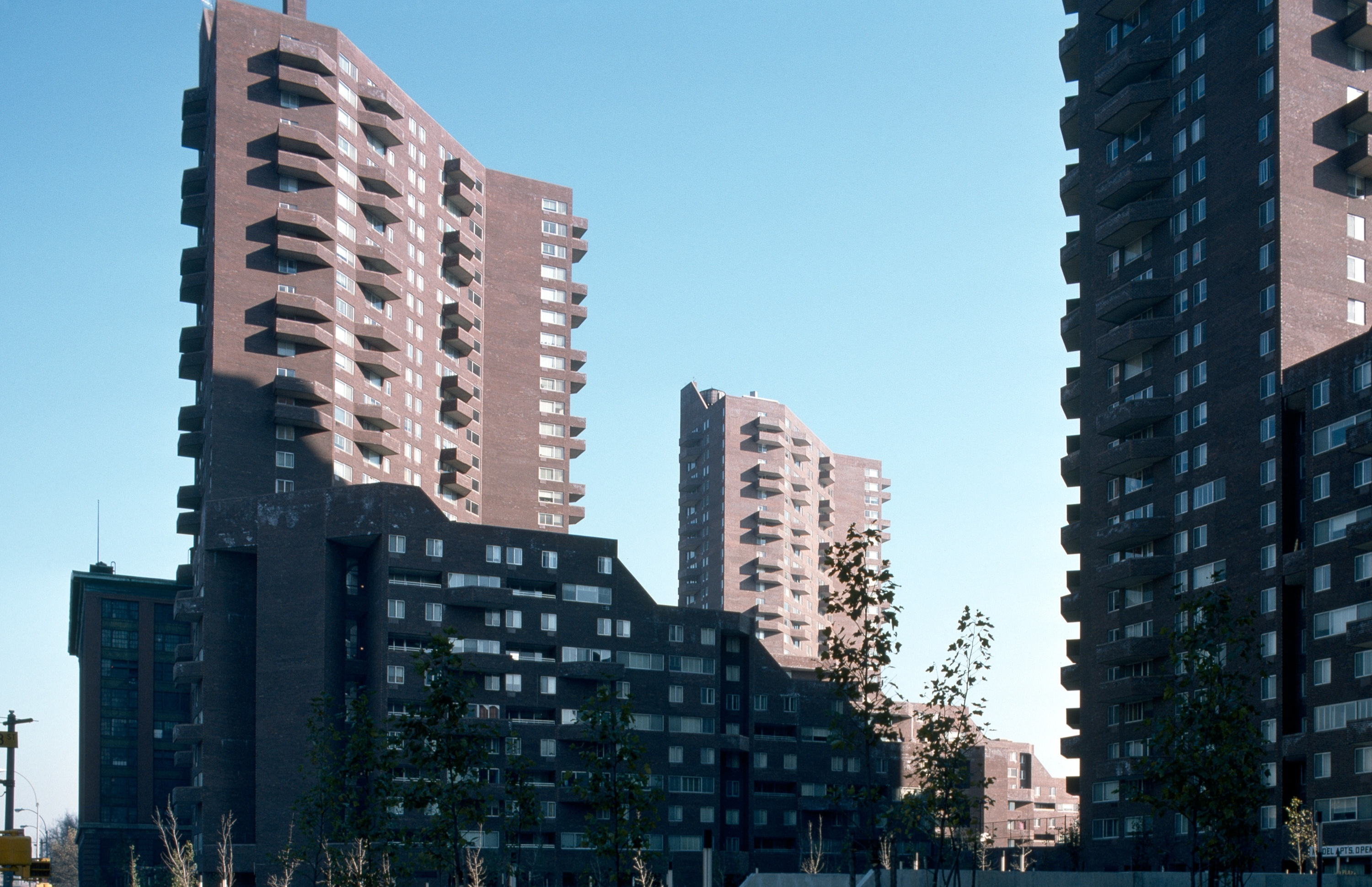
The 1199 plaza in the early 1970s

The 1199 Plaza was completed in 1974. At that time, monthly rent was $145 per month for two rooms. The maximum income allowed for single tenants was $9,736, and $20,000 for two adults with children.

At the time, 1199 Plaza was lauded for its quality. Room sizes were described as "ample", in contrast to other examples of high-density public housing. The high-rise buildings had small apartments, while the mid-rise buildings had larger apartments, for families.

In 1976, the 1199 Plaza received the Albert S. Bard Award for architecture.

Despite the ambitious nature of the project, the 1199 Plaza did not revitalize East Harlem. Nevertheless, Richard Plunz described the 1199 Plaza as "exceptionally successful". In the 1980s, crime in the area had risen by 41%, and by the year 1993, the 1199 Plaza was as stigmatized as any other housing project in East Harlem. 1199 resident Arohn Kee was active as a serial killer in the early 1990s; at least two of his victims, Rasheeda Washington and Paola Illera, also lived at the same complex.

Yet by the mid-1990s, crime had fallen by 41%. Michael Shapiro wrote that by the 1990s, the 1199 Plaza had cleaned up its image, and began offering apartments to higher-income renters, signifying its new hybrid status as an apartment complex for low, middle and high income residents.

As late as the 2010s, many of the earliest tenants of the 1199 Plaza still resided there.

== Connie Leung/Eric Louissant Case ==
In 2000, this housing complex was home to the Leung family a Hong Kong American family involving their young 17 years old teenage daughter Connie Leung being involved with an African American boyfriend named Eric Louissant who was 20 years old at the time and upon Connie's parents Stephen Leung and Chilin Leung discovering their relationship and disapproving of Connie's interracial relationship including blaming her relationship involvement caused her academic grades to drop, they forbade her from seeing Louissant and then in retaliation Connie and Louissant strangled Stephen and Chilin to their deaths upon their arrival home and then stuffed them into large laundry bags placing them in the closet for days before pushing them in a large shopping cart to dispose their bodies into the East River. They were eventually caught and arrested at the YMCA for their crimes.

== Notable residents ==
- Arohn Kee, serial killer. Two of his victims (Rasheeda Washington and Paola Illera) also resided at the complex.
- Damon Dash, founder of Roc-a-Fella records.
- Cam'ron, rapper
- Malik Yoba, Actor
- Jim Jones – rapper

== See also ==
- 1199: The National Health Care Workers' Union
- Leon J. Davis
