= Rose Delores Gibbs =

African American doctor

Rose Delores Gibbs (born 1946) was the first female African American doctor to graduate from the Medical University of South Carolina, and the first black woman to serve as the chief medical officer in the Peace Corps.

== Early life and education ==
Rose Delores Gibbs was born in 1946 in Moncks Corner, South Carolina. She grew up with two brothers and three sisters. She attended high school in Camden, South Carolina, at Boyer Haven Mather Academy. She graduated from Fisk University in Nashville, Tennessee and the Medical University of South Carolina in Charleston. She was the first black female graduate from MUSC.

== Career ==
Gibbs was the first black woman to serve as the chief medical officer in the Peace Corps. While in the Peace Corps, she was responsible for the health care of the other Peace Corps volunteers in 55 other countries. Rose practiced medicine in a variety of African, Caribbean and South Pacific countries while under the Peace Corps. She also made many medical mission trips to Roatan, Honduras. While on these trips she provided medical care to Afro and Latino Honduran citizens.

After her time working for the Peace Corps, she returned home to Moncks Corner. Gibbs was focused on building a community-like solo practice until she retired in October 2022. Without any of her Peace Corps work she would not have had the confidence she had to open a solo practice in a rural area.

== Awards and philanthropy ==
She was awarded South Carolina Rural Physician of the Year by the South Carolina Office of Rural Health. Gibbs holds a lifelong commitment to Moncks Corner, where she has provided many opportunities for rural children to learn tennis and acting skills. Her drive to serving under-represented students led her to endow a scholarship at her alma mater, the Medical University of South Carolina. Gibbs is also in the process of developing a scholarship at Fisk University, where she hopes to create a program to address violence that may perpetrated by youth. Gibbs was also given the honor of addressing MUSC graduates on May 18th, 2024 during their commencement ceremony.
