= Charleston sanitation strike =

1969 US worker strike

- Part of the Civil Rights Movement in South Carolina
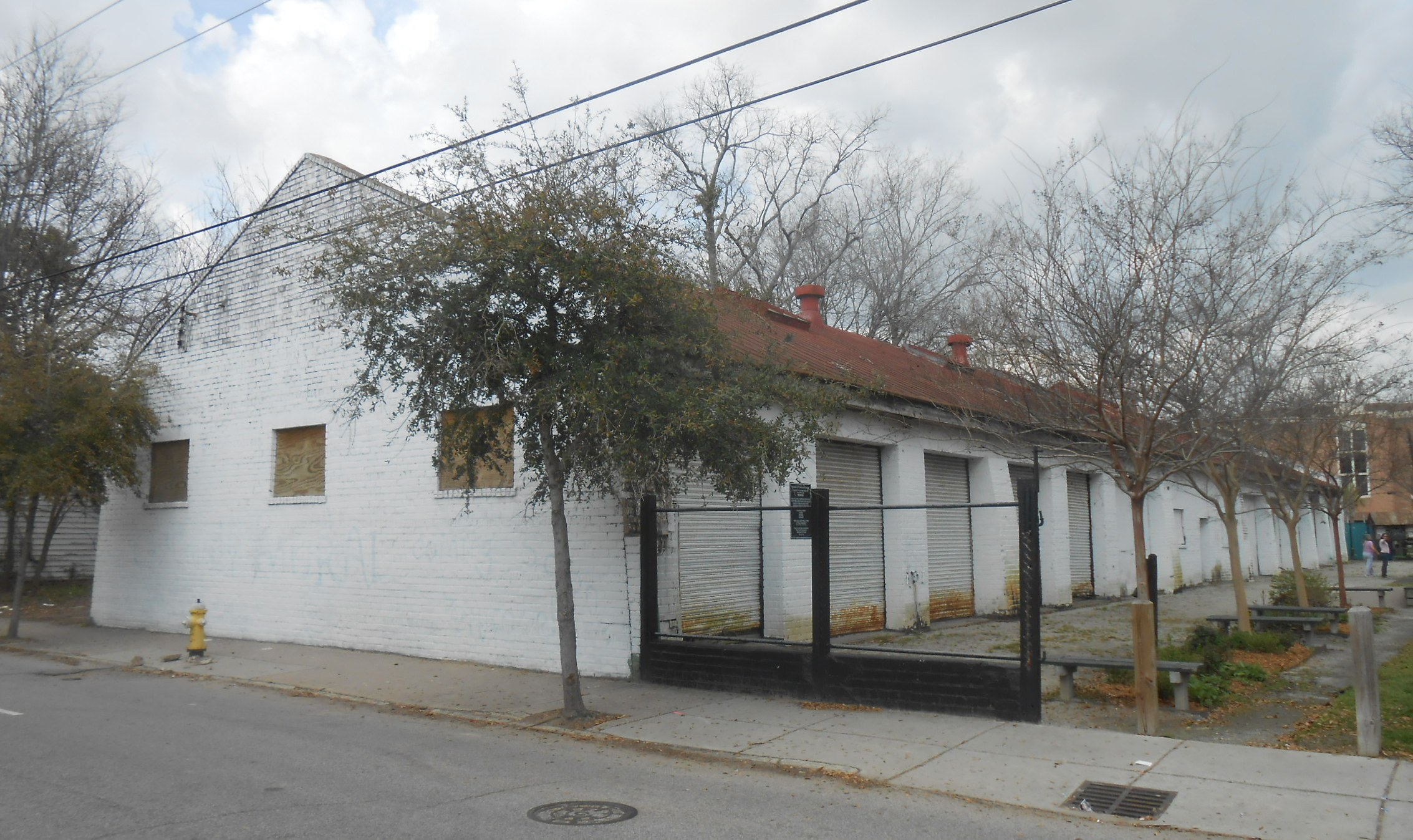
- Date: August 15, 1969 – October 29, 1969
- Location: Charleston, South Carolina
- Caused by: Pay inequality; Union activity
- Result: Increase of pay for African-American sanitation workers; Creation of a more neutral grievance procedure

Parties
Southern Christian Leadership Conference (SCLC)	City of Charleston, South Carolina

The Charleston sanitation strike was a more than two-month movement in Charleston, South Carolina, that protested the pay and working conditions of Charleston's overwhelmingly African-American sanitation workers.

From March to June 1969, the 1969 Charleston hospital strike had brought several national leaders of the Civil Rights Movement to Charleston.

== Black sanitation workers strike ==
On August 15, 1969, the city's Black sanitation workers declared a strike, and some other public workers joined in the effort. Mayor Gaillard was planning to announce a reduction from a six-day workweek to a five-day workweek, and he claimed that the strike was being pushed by groups not from Charleston that were trying to take credit for the change that had been in the works for several months. On August 19, 1969, the city announced that garbage collection would no longer happen on Saturdays; the accommodate the shortened week, residents’ garbage would be collected only twice a week instead of three times a week.

The mayor adamantly opposed labor organization, and by August 16, the city was already running ads to hire replacements for workers who would be fired. Garbage service was continued but only at a significant cut to one-third the normal amount using White non-strikers and prison labor. Garbage trucks were moved to the National Guard Armory, and patrolmen were stationed at the Line Street facility where union organizers encouraged workers not to report to work. A union representative said that the workers wanted better salaries, uniforms to wear at work, and a better medical insurance plan. A representative of the union said that a $3 hourly salary (up from $1.88 per hour) was expected.

== Protests and settlement negotiations ==
After one week, the protestors increased their activities and picketed at the Cannon Street firehouse to oppose firemen's doing the sanitation workers’ jobs during the strike. The city announced City-wide raises for workers earning less than $5000 a year and either rain gear or uniforms for sanitation workers, but the garbage workers held out for more of their demands including an immediate salary increase and the recognition of their union.

When the strike dragged out, Governor McNair sent 20 state patrolmen to protect the remaining workers following an attack on a garbageman. The governor also announced that he was considering a state law that would bar public employees from striking, observing that Charleston had already seen three other work stoppages in 1969—a strike of port workers came first followed by two famous nurses’ strikes. Later in 1969, anti-strike laws were drafted in Columbia in response to the strike.

Tensions escalated for several weeks. The UAW lent its support to the striking workers as did the Southern Christian Leadership Conference and also the Concerned Clergy Committee.

On September 20, 1969, marchers marched from Sumter Street to City Hall. At the end of September, the City notified the strikers that they would lose their insurance as of October 1. The Union of City Employees offered to pick up the strikers’ insurance costs so their policies would not lapse.

In October, James Clyburn (now Congressman Clyburn) served as a representative for the Business and Professional Men's Association (a coalition of Black leaders and organizations) in negotiating with the city. He was concerned about negotiations because of failures by the Medical University and County Hospital to comply with the settlement of the nurses strike earlier that year. The points of contention had been reduced to (1) an increased salary, (2) the ability to pay dues automatically to a union from their credit union, and (3) a neutral arbiter of disputes to replace the mayor. The strike ended on October 29, 1969, with the City paying $2 per week more, rehiring all strikers with seniority rights preserved, and creating a grievance procedure that did not involve the mayor.

== See also ==
- African Americans in South Carolina
- St. Petersburg sanitation strike of 1968
