= 1199SEIU United Healthcare Workers East =

United States healthcare union

1199SEIU
- 1199SEIU United Healthcare Workers East
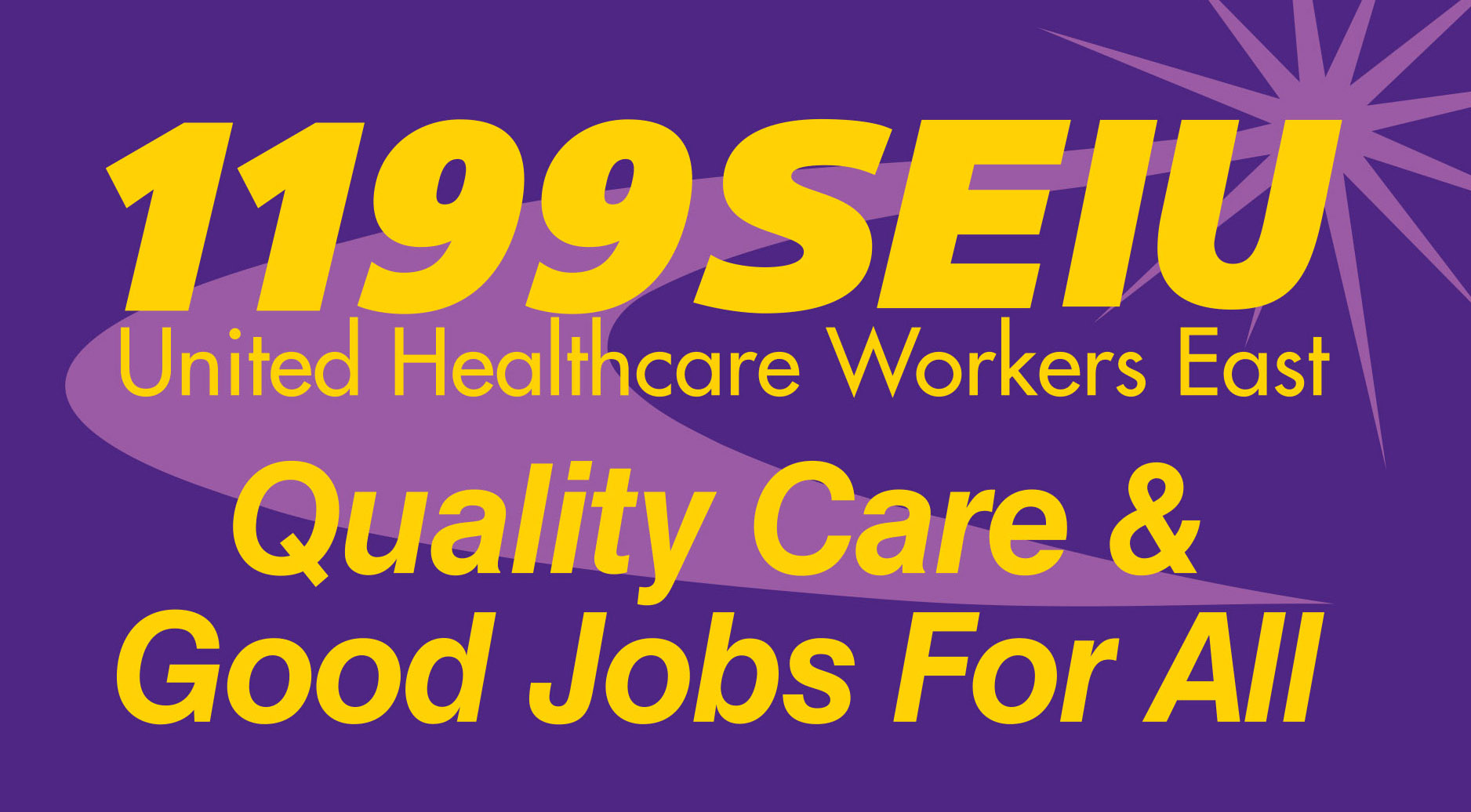
- Founded: 1932
- Headquarters: New York, New York
- Location: Massachusetts, New York, New Jersey, Maryland, D.C., Florida
- Members: 450,000
- President: Yvonne Armstrong
- Secretary-Treasurer: Veronica Turner-Biggs
- Key people: Leon J. Davis, founder Doris Turner; Dennis Rivera
- Affiliations: SEIU
- Website: www.1199seiu.org

1199SEIU United Healthcare Workers East is a healthcare union in the United States, with a membership of 400,000, including retirees. It is a local union within the Service Employees International Union. It is a former local of 1199: The National Health Care Workers' Union.

== History ==
The 1199 Union traces its origins to women of color employed at drug stores and volunteer hospitals in New York City, who worked for relatively low wages.

== Influence ==
Patrick Gaspard, a former executive vice president for politics and legislation at the union, was the political director for Barack Obama's presidential campaign. Gaspard was appointed White House Political Director during Obama's first term in office.

In 2016, 1199SEIU's president George Gresham was credited by New York Governor Andrew Cuomo for helping secure the passage of the $15 minimum wage in New York State.

== Spending ==
A 2025 Politico investigation found multiple instances of questionable union expenditures used for the personal benefit of Gresham, his family members, and political allies. Under Gresham, 1199SEIU paid for flights to South Africa, concerts during Gresham's family reunions in a small Virginia town, lavish parties with celebrities, de facto personal chauffeurs for Gresham, salaries and penthouse suites for a nonprofit seeking to "eliminate racial inequities in the criminal justice system", and medical bills for Jesse Jackson. Politico also found discrepancies between recorded expenditures and other documents.

1199SEIU said that they complied with federal laws requiring management of union funds "solely for the benefit of the union" and proper authorization and disclosure of all expenditures.

== See also ==
- List of unions designated 1199
- Leon J. Davis
- SEIU
