= SEIU 1199 WKO =

Service Employees International Union local

SEIU 1199 WKO is a local of the Service Employees International Union, SEIU representing Health Care and Social Service Workers in West Virginia, Kentucky, and Ohio. Before merging with SEIU 1199 WKO was part of 1199: The National Health Care Workers' Union.
