= I Am Somebody (1970 film) =

1970 film by Madeline Anderson

- Directed by: Madeline Anderson
- Written by: Madeline Anderson
- Produced by: American Foundation of Non-Violence
- Starring: Coretta Scott King; Ralph Abernathy; Leon Davis; Andrew Young
- Edited by: Madeline Anderson
- Release date: 1970
- Running time: 28 minutes
- Country: United States
- Language: English

I Am Somebody is a 1970 short political documentary by Madeline Anderson about black hospital workers on strike in Charleston, South Carolina. This was the first half-hour documentary film by an African-American woman in the film industry union. This film is one of the first to link black women and the fight for civil rights.

== Summary ==
Four hundred black hospital and nursing home employees, all but 12 women, organize for higher pay and unionization for over 100 days in Charleston, South Carolina. The film follows the efforts of the strikers as they receive help from Coretta Scott King and both praise and admonishment from the public, even capturing the National Guard's arrival to the strikes. The documentary captures the workers' fight, considered "...one of the south’s most disruptive and bitter labor confrontations since the 1930s”, for recognition through the lens of an African-American women, and focuses on striker and mother Claire Brown. With the help of thousands of inspired protestors, the efforts were ultimately successful.

== Production ==
Anderson was commissioned to create a documentary about the strike by the Hospital Workers Union Local 1199. She used archival footage and interviews with strikes and city officials. Of the commission, Anderson recalls:

They were looking for a filmmaker because they wanted to make a film about the strike. Someone had recommended me, and so, would I be interested? Yeah! I had already done so much research, and I knew what was available in the libraries. I was so overjoyed to do it. I would have done it for nothing, but this was the first time that I had a proper budget. They gave me money, time, everything that I needed to make this film.

Anderson shared an interest in fighting for equity: "I knew that the obstacles that were before me were based on gender, race and politics...I tried to make a film that reflected my experience through their eyes." The film captures the events through a feminist's lens.

== Reception and legacy ==
Civil rights leaders praised the film; Fannie Lou Hamer said "..this film packs a tremendous punch and is deeply moving at the same time." Manohla Dargis of The New York Times called it a "a familiar story of social injustice and self-determination that relates to the larger civil rights movement even as it remains rooted in specific lives".

In 2019, the film was selected by the Library of Congress for preservation in the United States National Film Registry for being "culturally, historically, or aesthetically significant".

== In popular culture ==
Clips from the film appeared in a 2008 episode of The Colbert Report.
