= Madeline Anderson =

American documentary filmmaker

Madeline Anderson (born ca. 1923) is an American filmmaker, television and documentary producer, film director, editor and screenwriter. She is best known for her films Integration Report One (1960) and I Am Somebody (1970), the latter of which garnered national and international acclaim. In 2015, the National Museum of African American History and Culture officially recognized Integration Report One as the first documentary film to be directed by an African-American woman.

Anderson also became the first African-American woman to executive produce a nationally aired television series, a 1975 PBS educational series titled Infinity Factory. She was inducted into the Black Filmmakers Hall of Fame in 1993 alongside actress Rosalind Cash.

== Early life ==
Born Madeline Whedbee, Anderson grew up in Lancaster, Pennsylvania, where she developed a passion for film and teaching. She had four siblings - two sisters and two brothers. As a child during the 1930s, Anderson lived in the Barney Google Row homes, a group of dilapidated three-room houses located on an unpaved street in the 700 block of Southeast Avenue in Lancaster's southeastern 7th Ward neighborhood. In a 2016 interview, Anderson recalled that the Barney Google Row, which were named after the landlord's resemblance to the Barney Google comic strip character, were "the worst housing in Lancaster". The homes were later condemned and torn down during the 1950s.

Each Saturday, she would regularly attend the movie theaters with family and friends. During those screenings, Anderson felt that the films she saw did not reflect her reality. She wanted to see real African Americans that she could relate to. This is one of the reasons why she gravitated towards educational documentary filmmaking. This direction also enabled her to incorporate her passion for teaching.

Her family and friends were surprised and hesitant to learn that she wanted to become a filmmaker because they often equated filmmaking with Hollywood and it was common knowledge that a black woman could not aspire to be a Hollywood filmmaker. They encouraged her to become a teacher instead.

She graduated from J. P. McCaskey High School in 1945 and enrolled in Millersville State Teacher's College to pursue teaching as a career. Anderson was just the second black student ever admitted to Millersville and the only black student at the college at the time. At college, she experienced racism and harassment from mostly young white males. On one occasion, her father had to take the bus and go to school with her in order to prevent any possible harassment. To the disappointment of her parents, Madeline dropped out after her first year due to the harassment and bullying. She promised her parents that she would return to school on the condition that she didn't have to return to Millersville.

For the next two years, Anderson worked at a factory to raise enough money to move to New York. She eventually received a partial scholarship at New York University (NYU), where she earned her bachelor's degree in psychology. Still passionate about motion pictures, she eventually decided to pursue a career in film.

== Career ==
While still studying at NYU, Madeline Anderson sought to establish connections which would get her into the industry. Still searching for work, she decided to answer a job ad as a babysitter boarder for Richard Leacock, a well-known British documentary filmmaker and a pioneer in Direct Cinema and Cinéma vérité. She got the job; and while living with the family, she expressed her ambitions to become a filmmaker and was met with their support. She became a member of Leacock's friends and colleagues. Her learning experiences in producing and directing films were obtained while working with Richard Leacock.

Madeline Anderson’s career in film officially began in 1958 when Richard Leacock offered her a job as a production manager at his company, Andover Productions. As a production manager, her role was to supervise everything from production to editing. Anderson worked on two film series during her time at the company. The first was a series of science films for the Massachusetts Institute of Technology and the second was a series of documentary films for NBC called Bernstein in Europe, which chronicled the overseas travels of conductor/composer Leonard Bernstein.

After completing her first film, Integration Report One, she felt that she had much more to learn about independent filmmaking. She started attending courses at the Museum of Modern Art with the aims of learning all aspects of filmmaking and motion-pictures. She took classes on editing, lighting, sound recording and camerawork. Anderson's film "Integration Report One" was produced by Andover Productions in 1959. Editing gave her a voice by enabling her to say what she wanted to say.

=== Film ===
In 1959 she left Andover Productions to pursue her own career. During this period, she worked as script clerk, and assistant editor in 1962 on Shirley Clarke’s The Cool World. The two had previously met while working at Andover Productions. The film itself is a semi-documentary dealing with the horrors of gang life in Harlem. Anderson later remarked:

The way I feel about the film now is that I think it was an honest film. It wasn't a romantic idea of who the young people were in the film. That’s how they were. Some of the young actors in the film were from gangs or were friends of gang members. I think Shirley tried to do a good job of telling the truth about what was going on at the time. I think it was one of the best films at that time of the genre.

— Madeline Anderson, Reel Black Talk: A Sourcebook of 50 American Filmmakers

Afterwards, Anderson worked as a freelance editor while trying to get into the industry. However, this proved to be difficult because to get into the industry, she had to be part of a union but to become part of a union, she had to have a job. This became even more problematic because most unions were primarily father-son unions, dominated by white males. Anderson decided to work non-union while simultaneously trying to get into one. This was a difficult decision because she was subjected to exploitation and racism. She eventually got into New York’s editors union, Local 771, after threatening to sue the union.

With union membership she was able to get a job as editor at WNET (a PBS station). While working there she worked as a staff editor for Black Journal and produced and directed "A Tribute to Malcolm X". She later left WNET after working as an editor there in order to produce, direct and edit I Am Somebody in 1970. She created her own production company in 1975 called Onyx Productions. There she made 16mm films for the New Jersey Board of Higher Education as well as a film for the Ford Foundation called The Walls Came Tumbling Down dealing with a public housing project in St. Louis, Missouri. Having her own production company enabled her to be more independent, have more control over production as well as establish herself as a reputable filmmaker.

==== Integration Report One ====
Integration Report One is a survey film that chronicles the civil rights struggle of the late 1950s. The film featured many individuals who would later become influential figures in the Civil Rights Movement, such as Martin Luther King Jr., Bayard Rustin, Andrew Young and many others. Anderson saw the racial struggles occurring and felt obliged to make the film, believing that documenting the events would inform and encourage others to act. She then approached Leacock with the idea for the film and he encouraged her to make it.

Finding proper funding for the film was difficult because many executives did not think the topic was interesting. Luckily, she was able to collect the funds she needed by using part of her salary from Andover Productions and by asking others to donate. Some individuals offered their help, including D. A. Pennebaker, who built a contraption that allowed her to do tracking shots, and Maya Angelou, who sang "We Shall Overcome" for the film, free of charge.

Under the supervision of Andover Productions, Anderson began filming in 1959. The first thing that was shot was a demonstration over school education in Ocean-Hill Brownsville, Brooklyn. She proceeded by moving further down south. After completing the film in 1960, Anderson had a difficult time getting a distributor to pick it up so she began exhibiting it at churches and colleges. It wasn't too long before the film was eventually picked up by Columbia University’s distribution outlet.

Originally, the film was supposed to be a blueprint for the Civil Rights Movement with two other installments planned called Integration Report Two and Integration Report Three. The two other parts would have continued to document the Civil Rights Movement as it occurred. However, they never happened because she could not find anyone who was interested and who could provide further funding.

In 2015, the National Museum of African American History and Culture in Washington D.C. recognized Integration Report One as the first documentary film to be directed by an African-American woman.

==== I Am Somebody ====
I Am Somebody is about the 400 Black women workers at the Medical College Hospital of the University of South Carolina who went on strike in Charleston. The film documents their struggle to achieve equal wages, justice and dignity. It is made up of stock footage from film libraries, newsreel footage and footage shot by Anderson and her crew on location during the event. This was convenient for her and her crew because, by the time she had gotten the funding, most of the strike had already transpired.

She really wanted to make the film when she first heard about the strike. However, when she initially approached television networks with the idea, they did not give her funding because they did not see the event as important or interesting. Moe Foner, executive director of Local 1199 (the union that was on strike), found out about Anderson’s desire to make the film and, wanting to record the events himself, approached her to make it for the union. Anderson finally managed to acquire funding because, when she approached the networks a second time, the strike had become an international event.

Anderson felt a profound responsibility to justly and truthfully portray her subjects during production. While addressing some of the film’s criticisms, she explains how she was able to create a film that did just that:

The kinship I felt toward the women of I Am Somebody compelled me to translate the essence of their experience to film as genuinely as I could. I identified with them as a Black woman as a Black working woman, as a wife and mother of children. Their grit and determination to succeed were evocative of my own efforts to become a member of the film editors’ union. Our obstacles were the same, those of gender, racial discrimination, and politics. In the criticisms and analyses of the film by some white feminists during the 70s, I Am Somebody was not regarded as a feminist film. To me, the importance of the film was not its classification, however; it is a film made by a Black woman for and about Black women. At the time my concern was had I been successful in making a film that was true to their experience?

— Madeline Anderson, "Madeline Anderson in Conversation: Pioneering an African American Documentary Tradition"

=== Television ===
From 1963 to 1968, Anderson worked for NET (National Education Television) in New York as an associate producer, writer and editor before the station became WNET. In 1965, she became a film editor, writer and a producer-director for the Black Journal series, which discussed the racial issues and debates occurring in America at that time. For the first year of the series, Anderson was the only black woman on staff. As it became more diversified, there was an increasing demand for a black executive producer. In 1969, Al Perlmutter agreed to step down and his title went to William Greaves who was originally brought on in 1966 as a part-time host for the show. Within a year, the show would go on to win an Emmy.

After completing I Am Somebody, she returned to television but this time it was for the Children's Television Workshop (CTW). At the CTW, she worked as an in-house producer/director for Sesame Street and The Electric Company. According to Anderson, some of the films she made for CTW were controversial. She recalled one incident where she had to make a film that taught and illustrated the word “me”. She decided to follow a child from the Chinese community with the aims of illustrating “me”. However, some individuals were against the idea because they thought that children would have a difficult time relating to the child on screen due to her ethnicity.

Anderson worked at CTW from 1970 to 1975 before leaving to form Onyx Productions. While she had her own production company, she still worked alongside CTW, lending her services whenever they needed her. During this time, she also became involved in the start-up operation for WHMM-TV (now WHUT-TV) at Howard University where she taught and lectured.

In 1975, Anderson became the executive producer for The Infinity Factory on PBS. The show primarily targeted children between eight and twelve, putting emphasis on inner-city youths with the aims of teaching them math and problem-solving skills. With the show, Anderson became the first African-American female producer to have a nationally broadcast series. In 1987, she worked as a senior producer on an Arabic literacy series called Al Manahil. The series was produced by CTW International and was shot on location in Amman, Jordan.

== Attitudes towards filmmaking ==
=== Documentary practice ===
Anderson primarily seeks to identify with her subjects in order to ethically and morally represent their struggle. Michael T. Martin identifies three crucial components to Anderson’s documentary practice:

1. Film must have a social purpose; it must be accessible with the aims of evoking social change
2. It must prioritize the voices of those who would otherwise be marginalized and silenced
3. It must seek to resolve the myth that African Americans are unable to resolve their own affairs.

These tenets are similar to those adopted by the Third Cinema movement which questioned the moral and ethical responsibility of both popular and art cinema.

When making a film, Anderson is not preoccupied with fame or money; instead, she seeks to create something useful. She expressed this view when she said: "I think that media has to be utilitarian. I was criticized a lot for that view and I accept the criticism. I was not interested in making entertainment. I wanted my films to be used to improve our people. Many people dismissed my films as message films." Therefore, for her, the documentary is a film that is occupied with telling the truth. Truth consists of capturing real events as they unfold. This means that re-enactments of any sorts do not make a film a documentary because the footage is not real even if it is based on true events. She also saw little value in adding footage that might be entertaining because that was not her purpose.

=== Art and history ===
Anderson holds the view that history contributes to the evolution of the artist. She explains that the artist can be a part of contemporary history as it unfolds while simultaneously learning from it. History and art work together to educate the artist. Through this process art can serve a useful purpose. By documenting and learning from history, her art as well as her artistry evolves.

This perspective likely emerged from the fact that, as an artist, she did not have total creative freedom because the majority of her films were made for and funded by organizations. I Am Somebody was meant to be used as an organizing tool for the union. She had to be very specific about the purpose of the strike, the individuals involved in it and how it was eventually settled. There was one incident where her perspective as a filmmaker conflicted with her perspective as an educator. She explains that there were two people leading the strike; one was from the college hospital and the other was from the county hospital. She did not want to include the county hospital portion because, from a filmmaker’s point of view, it was confusing. However, due to her obligation to the union, she had to incorporate that portion.

=== Views on Hollywood ===
Anderson is critical of Hollywood cinema because, for the longest time, films that were depicting the African-American experience were not made by African-Americans. As such, films would often interpret their experience by resorting to mythical and stereotypical depictions. This unintentionally robbed them of their ability to express their own experiences. However, this changed during the blaxploitation era in the 1970s. While Anderson was critical of the exploitative content, she nonetheless saw it as an opportunity for black filmmakers to establish themselves within Hollywood. She also believed that the period was a necessary step towards a more integrated industry. Now, African-American filmmakers have the opportunity to express themselves honestly without relying on exploitative content. To do so now, according to Anderson, would be a step backwards.

As a filmmaker, Madeline Anderson was never particularly interested in pursuing a career in Hollywood because it did not fit with her humanitarian goals and aspirations. For her, Hollywood is the place where people go to gain money and universal exposure. She even turned down a film from Universal because she simply was not interested in achieving either.

When asked if she thought independent production and distribution outside the Hollywood system was a viable artistic and business venture, she responded by saying:

I think it’s viable artistically. In terms of business, I don’t think it’s moved as well as it should have. I think people shy away from the kinds of films we make outside the Hollywood system. There is a real change in the filmmaking world now. People tend to devalue films made outside Hollywood−more so in our community than others. We don’t seem to have a real art community yet, but it’s growing.

— Madeline Anderson, Reel Black Talk : A Sourcebook of 50 American Filmmakers

== Personal life ==
Anderson is a resident of Brooklyn, New York City.

== Filmography ==
- Integration Report One (1960): Producer/Director/Editor
- The Cool World (1964): Assistant Director/Assistant Editor
- Malcolm X: Nationalist or Humanist? (1967): Producer/Director
- I Am Somebody (1970): Producer/Director/Editor/Writer
- An Even Chance (1971): Producer/Director
- Being Me (1975): Director
- The Walls Came Tumbling Down (1975): Producer/Director/Editor
- The Infinity Factory (series, 1975): Executive Producer
- Al Manahil (series, 1987): Senior Producer/Writer

== Awards and honors ==
- In 1976, Madeline Anderson received the Woman of the Year award at the Sojourner Truth Festival of the Arts.
- In 1985, she was awarded with the Life-Long Achievement and Contributions to Film and Television by the Association of Independent Film and Video Makers.
- In 1991, she was inducted into the Gallery of Great Black Filmmakers by the Miller Brewing Company.
- In 1993, she was inducted in the Black Filmmakers Hall of Fame.
- In 2000, she received an award for Pioneering Women in Film, for outstanding contributions to film and television
- In 2015, Integration Report One was accepted into the Smithsonian National Museum of African American History and Culture. She is listed as the first African-American woman born in the United States to direct a 16 mm documentary film.
- In 2019, I Am Somebody was selected by the Library of Congress for preservation in the National Film Registry for being "culturally, historically, or aesthetically significant".
