= Stanley Turkel =

American historian and hotel manager (1925–2022)

- Born: Stanley Howard Turkel; September 2, 1925; The Bronx, New York, U.S.
- Died: August 12, 2022 (aged 96); Alexandria, Virginia, U.S.
- Education: New York University Stern School of Business
- Occupations: Historian and hotel manager
- Spouses: Barbara Bell (divorced) Rima Sokoloff (died 2014)
- Children: 2

Stanley Howard Turkel (September 2, 1925 – August 12, 2022) was an American historian and hotel manager.

== Biography ==
Turkel was born in The Bronx, New York, he the son of Molly Kurtzman and Nathan Turkel, a Polish emigrant. He attended DeWitt Clinton High School. Turkel attended New York University. At the age of 18, he served in the United States Army Air Forces during World War II. Turkel was discharged and returned to his home to attend the New York University Stern School of Business, earning a Bachelor of Science.

Turkel worked at his father's business and he served as a consultant at Victor Kramer's laundry business. He also worked at Leows and served as the hotel manager at Drake Hotel. Turkel worked at Historic Summit Inn Resort and served as the hotel manager of Sheraton Hotels and Resorts. He served as president of the City Club of New York from 1966 to 1969. Turkel then served as chairperson from 1979 to 1989. He was mentioned three times as "Historian of the Year" of the Historic Hotels of America program.

Turkel resided in Flushing, Queens. He later moved to Alexandria, Virginia and resided there in the 2010s. Turkel died in August 2022 at his home in Alexandria, Virginia, at the age of 96.
