= Dennis Rivera (labor official) =

American healthcare consultant

Dennis Rivera (born 1950) is an American consultant and former labor official and a "nationally recognized health care leader" who has been speaking about the issues in the United States healthcare system since 1992.

== Early life ==
Born in Aibonito, Puerto Rico, Rivera studied in Cayey, Puerto Rico. After graduating from the University of Puerto Rico at Cayey he went on to organize and grow labor unions at hospitals in Puerto Rico and then in 1977 did the same in New York.

== Career ==
He is the former chair of the healthcare division of the Service Employees International Union and current Senior Adviser to the President of SEIU.

Since as early as 1992 Rivera has spoken for a national healthcare system. In 1997, Rivera worked with the CEOs of New York hospitals and the governor of New York to improve service provided by New York hospitals.

Rivera's views on the U.S. healthcare system is that there are structural problems. In 2016, Rivera spoke about the disparity in payments to doctors in Puerto Rico versus payments to doctors in states of the United States under the existing federal statutes. Rivera said that the current system of payments by the U.S. Federal government to the different health care systems in Puerto Rico is causing a crisis in Puerto Rico with doctors leaving the island, among other issues.

A recognized expert on the healthcare system of the United States, Rivera participates in summits with others before congress.

During the COVID-19 pandemic, Rivera was a member of a commission put together by Governor Cuomo to improve telemedicine in New York. At that time, Rivera was also working with Cuomo on fixing the Medicaid payment system.
