= SEIU Healthcare Pennsylvania =

American health care workers labor union

SEIU District 1199P is the former name of a health care workers local union of the Service Employees International Union in Pennsylvania. It is now called SEIU Healthcare Pennsylvania. It has a membership of 20,000.
