= 1199: The National Health Care Workers' Union =

American labor union (1932–1998)

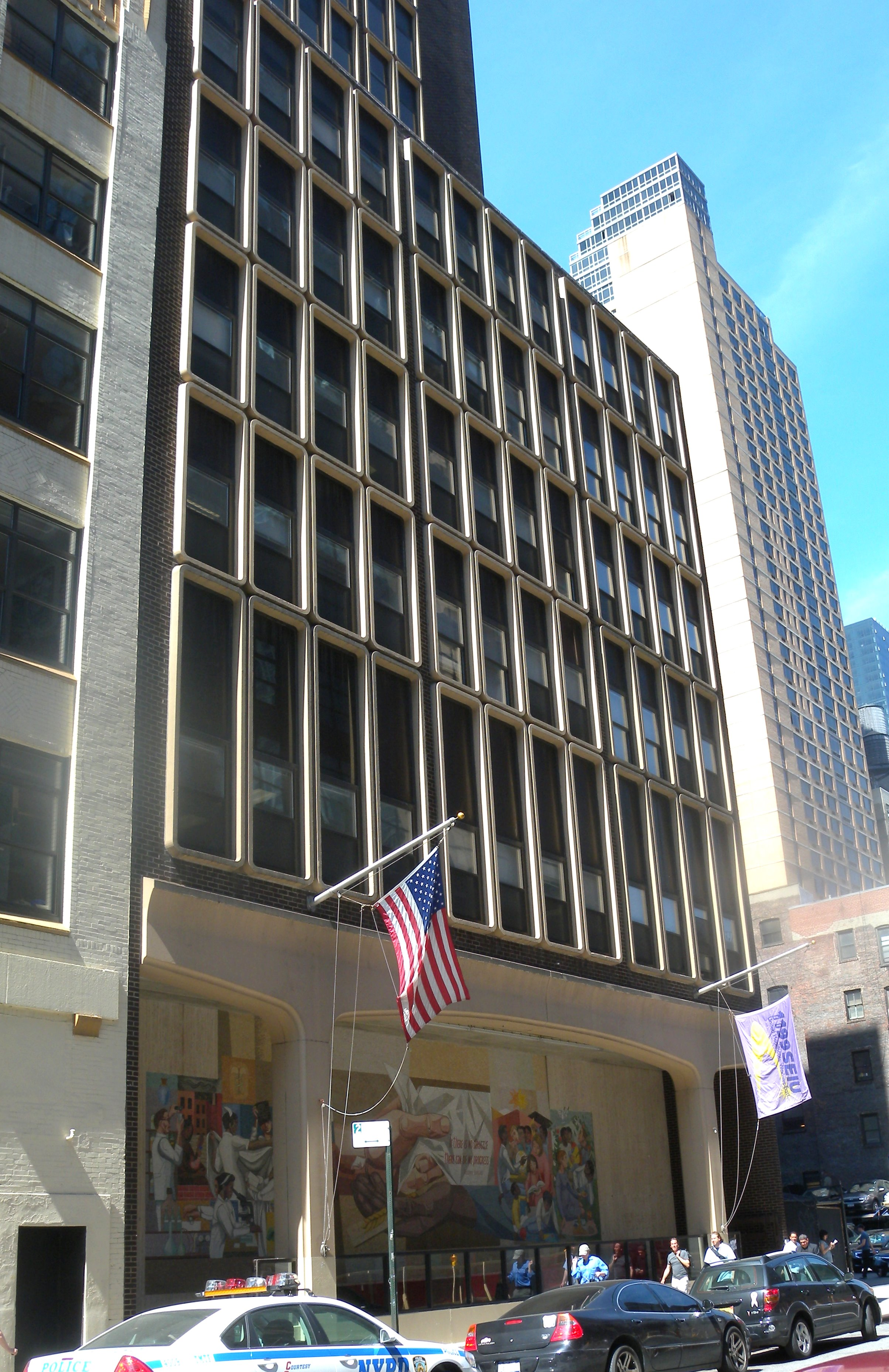
New York headquarters

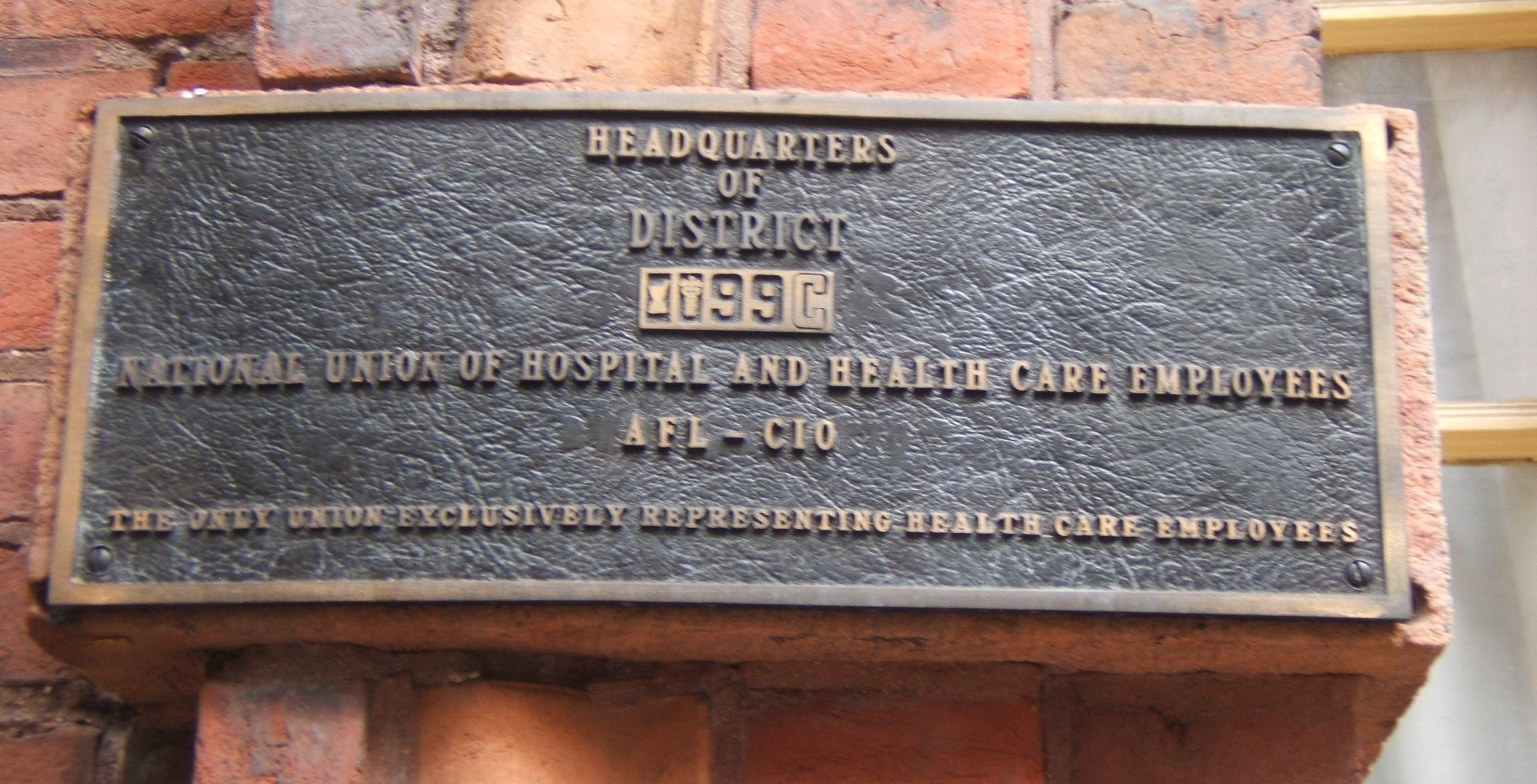
Headquarters, District 1199C of the 1199: The National Health Care Workers' Union, and listed on National Register of Historic Places.

1199: The National Health Care Workers' Union is an American labor union founded as the Drug, Hospital, and Health Care Employees Union-District 1199 by Leon J. Davis for pharmacists in New York City in 1932. The union organized all workers in drug stores on an industrial basis, including pharmacists, clerks, and soda jerks. The union led pioneering pickets and strikes against racial segregation and racially discriminatory hiring in Harlem and elsewhere in New York City through the 1930s and 1950s.

== History ==
Initially, the 1199 Union mainly consisted of women of color employed at drug stores (and later volunteer hospitals) throughout New York City.

Since 1199 was a "left-led" union, its leadership was investigated by the House Un-American Activities Committee in 1948 for Communist "infiltration." 1199 was a tiny local at the time, however, and during the expulsions of large left-led unions from the Congress of Industrial Organizations (CIO) in the 1940s, 1199 as a local eventually found shelter under the auspices of the Retail, Wholesale, and Department Store Union. In the late 1950s, the drugstore-based union launched large-scale organizing drives at voluntary hospitals in New York, mobilizing a heavily African-American and Puerto Rican-American workforce in the first flush of the postwar Civil Rights Movement. Martin Luther King Jr. famously described 1199 as "my favorite union", and his widow, Coretta Scott King, became the honorary chair of 1199's organizing campaigns as it sought to expand outside of New York City beginning in the late 1960s.

The union's first campaign outside of New York City was the formation of District 1199B in Columbia, South Carolina in 1969. The union led a strike there that never led to a contract, but had success in creating new 1199 districts in Upstate New York, Philadelphia (and later other parts of Pennsylvania), Connecticut, Rhode Island, West Virginia, Kentucky, Ohio, and elsewhere.

Moe Foner, Organizer, Nonnie Perry and other leaders of 1199 began meeting with George Hardy in the late 1970s to explore affiliation with SEIU. The negotiations did not come to any conclusion. Serious faction fights broke out within the flagship New York local and among other 1199 locals after the retirement of the union's original leadership. 1199 eventually left the Retail, Wholesale and Department Store Union, and in the early 1980s a major split in 1199 led all of the union's locals outside New York City to disaffiliate and form their own independent national healthcare union, the National Union of Hospital and Health Care Employees (NUHHCE). The original 1199 remained with the RWDSU. NUHHCE received a charter from the AFl-CIO in 1984, which prevented any raids on it. But NUHHCE was too thinly spread nationwide, however, with 75,000 members in 12 locals, and its leaders quickly decided to merge with another national union. In 1989, NUHHCE permitted its locals to vote to merge with either SEIU or AFSCME. A third of the locals affiliated and the NUHHCE headquarters went with AFSCME, and two-thirds with SEIU. Most 1199 locals joined the Service Employees International Union to become 1199SEIU United Healthcare Workers East; 1199C in Philadelphia became the largest 1199 local to join the American Federation of State, County and Municipal Employees. The large flagship New York eventually left RWDSU. It joined SEIU in 1998.
