= Leon J. Davis =

Russian-born American labor leader

Leon Julian Davis (November 21, 1905 – September 14, 1992) was a Russian-born American labor leader who co-founded 1199: The National Health Care Workers' Union, as well as 1199SEIU United Healthcare Workers East.

== Background ==
Davis was born in Pinsk, Russian Empire, on November 21, 1906. At the age of 15 he settled with his Russian-speaking family in Hartford, Connecticut, where he attended public schools and learned English. In 1927 his family moved to New York City. After two years at Columbia University's pharmacy school, he left to become a drug store clerk.

== Career: Local 1199 union ==
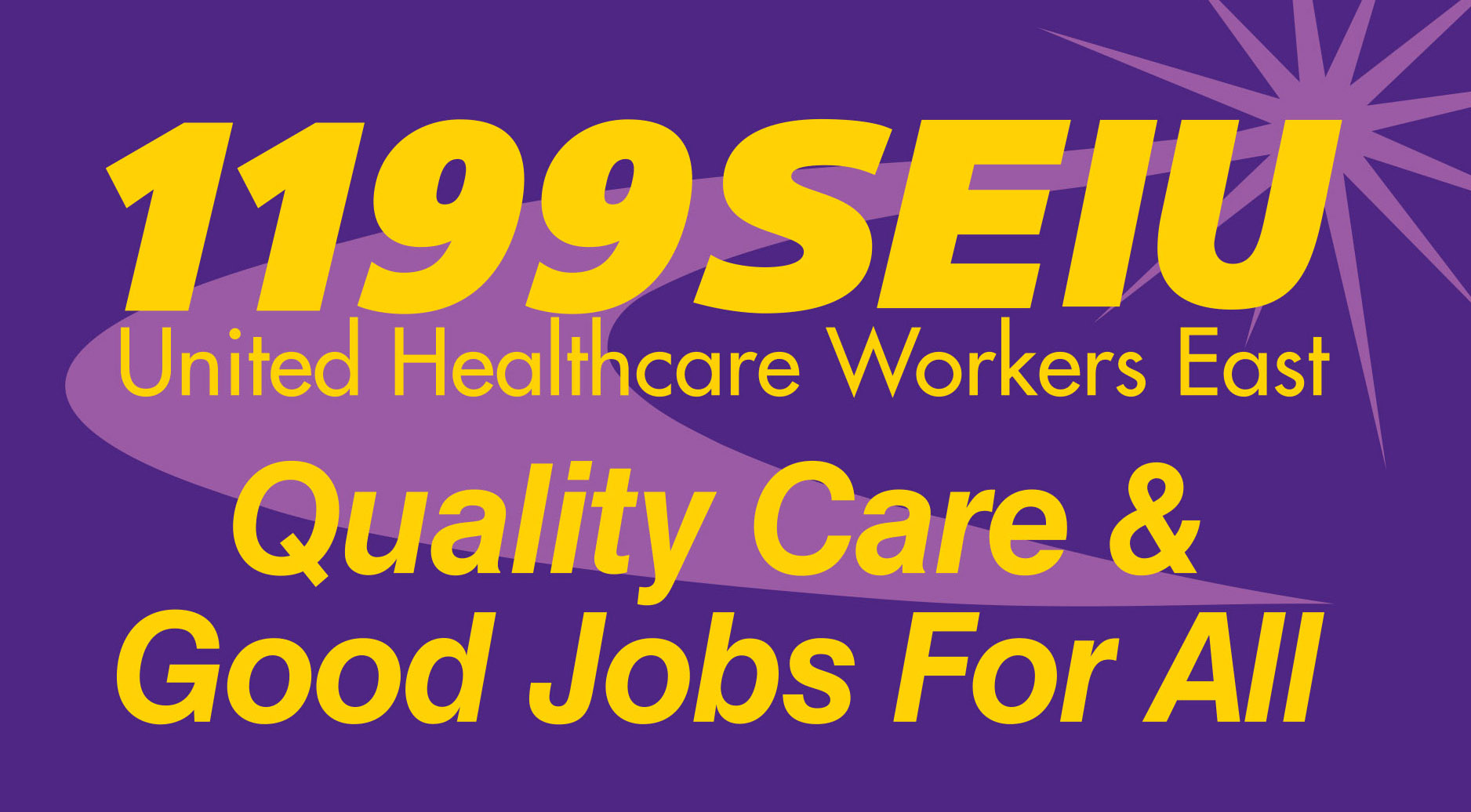
1199SEIU United Healthcare Workers East logo

In 1932 he founded Local 1199 of the Drug, Hospital, and Health Care Employees Union, which he ran for a half century. Local 1199 was a leader in walkouts in New York (1959, 1962) and Charleston, South Carolina (1969). He fought for collective bargaining, higher wages, better work conditions, and higher living standards. Union members included: clerks, janitors, aides, orderlies, laundry workers, porters, dishwashers, elevator operators, and other employees in hospitals, nursing homes and pharmacies. Local 1199 peaked at some 150,000 members in the late 1970s. It was early among unions to establish education and training for members, healthcare and housing for members' families, and scholarships and camps for members' children.

Leon J. Davis was instrumental to securing funding for the 1199 Plaza, a massive 1199 Union housing project.

During the Vietnam War, Local 1199 took an early anti-war position. It also supported the civil rights movement.

== Communist accusations ==
In 1948, Davis appeared before a Congressional committee and denied membership in the Communist Party. However, he did testify that Communists and labor in general shared many social objectives with him.

== Personal life and death ==
Davis married Julia Gaberman, a social worker; they had two daughters.

He loved art, music, and theater, read literature in three languages, gardened at his home in Flushing, Queens, New York.

He died of heart failure on September 14, 1992, at the Long Island Jewish Medical Center in New Hyde Park, New York.

== Legacy ==
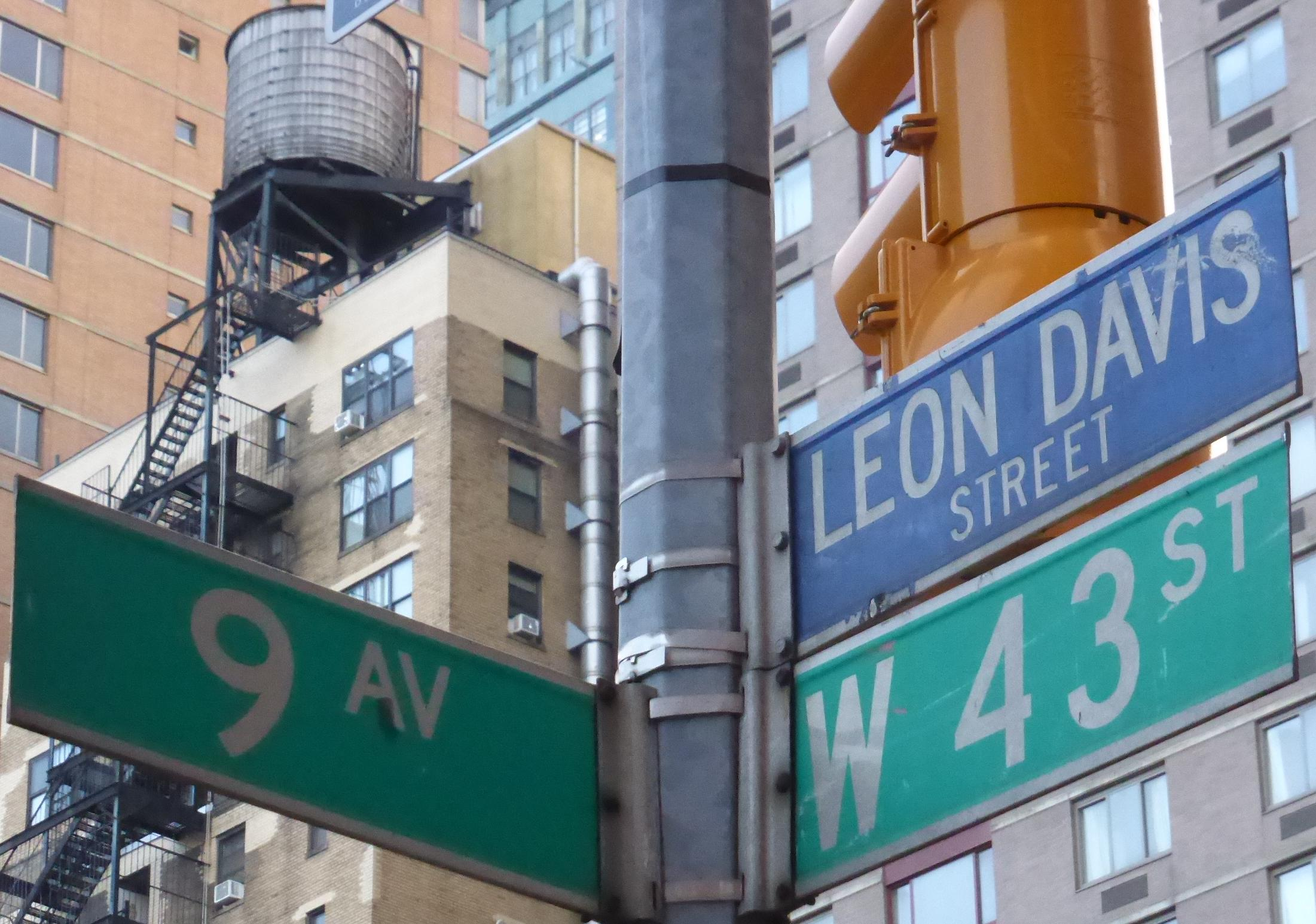
Leon Davis Street

Martin Luther King Jr. referred to Davis's organization as "my favorite union".

A Manhattan city block on West 43rd Street between Eighth and Ninth Avenues, near the Local 1199 headquarters at 310 West 43rd Street, was named in his honor.

Two books about the union, Upheaval in the Quiet Zone and Not for Bread Alone examine the deep, almost patriarchal connection between Davis and Local 1199.
