= SEIU Local 1199NE =

American health care workers union

SEIU District 1199 New England
- Service Employees International Union District 1199 New England
- New England Health Care Employees Union
- Image shown above is a SEIU poster for the healthcare workers in New England.
- Headquarters: Hartford, Connecticut
- Location: United States
- Members: 23,901
- Key people: Rob Baril, president
- Parent organization: SEIU
- Website: www.seiu1199ne.org

SEIU 1199 New England, also known as the New England Health Care Employees Union, is a local labor union that represents some 29,000 health care providers in the states of Connecticut and Rhode Island. Founded in 1958 in Connecticut with support from 1199 union organizers from New York, the local SEIU 1199 New England has union halls in Hartford, CT and Providence, RI. It is the largest health care workers union in Connecticut.

== Background ==
The SEIU District 1199 New England is a local union of the Service Employees International Union in the United States. As of September 2022, it represents over nearly 24,000 health care workers in the New England area, specifically in the states of Connecticut and Rhode Island. The union also acts on behalf of many porters, clerks, and cosmeticians. The organization was started by two main people; Leon Davis and Elliot Godoff, who were both members of the communist party and originally from Russia. During this time period, the Cold War helped to facilitate the red scare in America in which many people who were communist, or accused of being communist, could be purged and blacklisted. The Taft-Hartley Act was in effect at this point in time which meant that unions were required to sign affidavits claiming that they were not harboring any communists. For this reason, it was unusual for two communist party members to be the leaders of the SEIU 1199. Leon Davis and Elliot Godoff were very tough-minded people and are the reason for the militant and demanding style of strikes exhibited by the New England edition of the SEIU. These characteristics are unlike the other locations of the SEIU because in places like Seattle, the union was much less militant and more willing to negotiate.

In Connecticut the union is closely identified with liberal Democratic politicians such as Governor Dannel Malloy and has clashed frequently with fiscally conservative Republicans such as former Governor John G. Rowland as well as the Yankee Institute for Public Policy, a free-market think tank.

== Conversion from BSEIU to SEIU ==
According to the SEIU, in 1921, the Building Service Employers Union (BSEIU) was first formed in Chicago, Illinois. The BSEIU was unique from other unions because they had African American leaders in the union as well immigrants and women held leadership roles in the union. They led a strike in 1934 protesting the wages of the New York skyscraper employees. And later in that year they added the work of health care workers to their cause and helped them reach a contract with 11 hospitals. Changing the name of the Union as well as the direct mission of the Union, now named the Service Employees International Union. The direct mission involved a focus on the dignity of the employees rather than wages.

In 1959, Montefiore Medical Center became the first hospital in New York City to officially recognize 1199 SEIU. To improve healthcare benefits and wages for New York City hospital employees, the union organized a campaign to achieve collective bargaining rights.

== New England approach ==
The Local Chapter of the SEIU 1199 in New England took a different approach during the labor movement; they used more aggressive tactics in their striking rather than a more cautious approach similar to their peers in the Pacific Northwest. Their leader Leon Davis took an active role in the strikes, he led a strike of 3,500 healthcare workers in between 7 hospitals that lasted 56 days in 1962, that jailed Davis for 30 days after refusing a court order to call off the strike. A settlement was reached thanks to the help of Governor Nelson Rockefeller of New York, which put giving healthcare workers collective bargaining rights into law.

== SEIU involvement with African American community ==
The Union was committed to equal rights for everyone and took a stance with the African Americans of Harlem who pushed for black community members to be able to be pharmacists in the neighborhood of Harlem. The strike lasted 7 long weeks in the frigid winter months and gained the respect of Dr. Martin Luther King Jr. who joined the local chapter in its efforts after receiving financial aid for the Montgomery Bus Boycott. Dr. King Jr. famously said that the 1199 was his “favorite union” and this drew in even more attention from the general population and drew in outside support as well as opening the eyes to the healthcare workers now joining the union. The number of union members increased dramatically over the next decade with gaining recognition from the outside and the inside.
