= Affordable Home Ownership Development Program =

New York State housing grant program

- Type: State housing grant program
- Formed: 1985
- Jurisdiction: New York, U.S.
- Administrator: New York State Affordable Housing Corporation
- Parent agency: New York State Housing Finance Agency; New York State Homes and Community Renewal
- Abbreviation: AHODP (often abbreviated AHOD)
- Legal basis: New York Private Housing Finance Law Article 19; 21 NYCRR Part 2160
- Funding: State capital appropriations
- Website: hcr.ny.gov/affordable-housing-corporation-0

The New York State Affordable Home Ownership Development Program (AHODP), often referred to as the Affordable Home Ownership Development Program or AHOD, is a state-funded grant program that supports the construction, acquisition, rehabilitation, and improvement of owner-occupied housing for low- and moderate-income households in New York State. It is administered by the New York State Affordable Housing Corporation (AHC), a public-benefit corporation and subsidiary of the New York State Housing Finance Agency, under New York State Homes and Community Renewal (HCR).

The program provides grants to municipalities, municipal housing authorities, housing development fund companies, and not-for-profit or charitable organizations so that these entities can subsidize the cost of developing or improving one- to four-family homes, cooperative apartments, and condominiums for eligible owner-occupants. Grants are intended to make homeownership feasible for households that would otherwise be unable to afford ownership in the private market and to support neighborhood stabilization and community development.

== History and legal framework ==
The Affordable Home Ownership Development Program was created in 1985 as part of state legislation that also established the New York State Housing Trust Fund Corporation and the New York State Affordable Housing Corporation. The statutory framework is set out in Article 19 of the New York Private Housing Finance Law (sections 1110–1113), which includes a legislative finding that homeownership by persons of low and moderate income is an important element of community stability and that state assistance is needed to expand such opportunities.

Under Article 19, the Affordable Housing Corporation, organized as a subsidiary of the New York State Housing Finance Agency, is authorized to enter into contracts with eligible applicants and to provide grants for “affordable home ownership development programs” subject to the terms of the statute. Implementing regulations for the program are codified at 21 NYCRR Part 2160, which defines program terms and sets out basic requirements for projects and grant contracts.

Since its creation, the program has been funded through annual appropriations of state capital funds. Notices of funding availability issued by HCR in the 2010s and 2020s have typically announced between about US$25 million and US$30 million per year in AHODP funding, subject to the state budget and recaptured funds.

== Administration ==
The program is administered by the New York State Affordable Housing Corporation through HCR's Office of Community Renewal. AHC is a public-benefit corporation of the State of New York and a subsidiary of the New York State Housing Finance Agency; its mission, as described in financial statements and legislative materials, is to make homeownership affordable for low- and moderate-income families and individuals for whom there are no reasonable alternatives in the private market and to promote neighborhood development and stabilization.

The program operates statewide, with projects in each of New York's ten economic regions. A services directory issued by HCR lists the Affordable Home Ownership Development Program as one of the agency's principal homeownership programs, available to local governments and non-profit organizations throughout the state.

Administrative and support services for AHC, including staffing and budgeting, are shared with the Housing Finance Agency and related entities under New York State Homes and Community Renewal, and program activity is reported annually in AHC's audited financial statements.

== Program design ==
=== Eligible applicants ===
Under Article 19 and program regulations, “eligible applicants” include cities, towns, villages and counties in New York State; municipal housing authorities; housing development fund companies; and not-for-profit corporations or charitable organizations whose purposes include the development or improvement of housing. Applications are submitted by these sponsoring entities rather than by individual homeowners or homebuyers, and grants are awarded to the sponsors, which then use the funds to assist eligible households.

=== Eligible activities ===
Program rules and funding notices group eligible activities into three main project types:

- new construction of owner-occupied homes for sale, including one- to four-family dwellings, cooperative apartments, and condominiums, as well as replacement of substandard manufactured or mobile homes with new homes on owner-occupied sites;
- acquisition and rehabilitation of existing homes for sale to eligible owner-occupants; and
- home improvement projects for existing owner-occupied one- to four-family homes, cooperatives, or condominiums.

Program materials require that AHODP assistance be tied to owner-occupancy, and proposals must be organized by project type, with separate applications submitted for new construction, acquisition/rehabilitation, and home-improvement projects. Costs attributable to non-residential space in mixed-use buildings are generally ineligible for AHODP funding.

=== Beneficiary households and income limits ===
The statute and implementing regulations define the program as serving persons and families of low and moderate income and emphasize that assistance is intended for households that cannot purchase or improve homes without public support. Income limits, asset limits, and related eligibility criteria for individual homebuyers or homeowners are set by regulation and by program solicitations and typically reference federal income limits published by the United States Department of Housing and Urban Development (HUD), with variations by region and project type.

The Office of the State Comptroller has described the program as providing grants “of up to $40,000 per dwelling” to eligible existing and prospective homeowners during the early 2010s, subject to liquid-asset limits and other conditions. Later funding notices introduced a higher per-unit cap, up to US$75,000 per dwelling, with tiered limits tied to the depth and duration of affordability commitments.

=== Grant amounts and funding ===
Grant funds are drawn primarily from annual state capital appropriations to the Affordable Housing Corporation, together with repayments and recaptured funds from prior projects. NOFAs in fiscal years 2016–2017 and 2025–2026, for example, announced US$25.25 million and US$26 million respectively in available AHODP funding for new awards.

Per-unit funding limits and maximum award sizes are set in program regulations and funding notices. Earlier guidance established a general cap of US$35,000 per unit, with an increased limit of US$40,000 in designated high-cost areas, and set a typical maximum award of US$1 million per project sponsor. More recent notices have increased the per-unit cap to US$75,000 with a tiered structure that links higher grant levels to deeper affordability and longer affordability periods.

AHODP assistance is structured as grants from AHC to sponsoring organizations, which may in turn provide assistance to households as grants, loans, deferred-payment loans, or other forms of subsidy allowed under Article 19 and program regulations.

== Oversight and evaluation ==
The Affordable Home Ownership Development Program is subject to financial statement audits and performance audits by independent auditors and by the New York State Office of the State Comptroller (OSC). A 2014 OSC performance audit examining a sample of metropolitan-area projects concluded that most program recipients met income and asset requirements but identified some instances in which homeowners exceeded liquid-asset limits or where documentation was incomplete, and recommended clearer guidance and improved monitoring of local grant managers.

Earlier audits of the Affordable Housing Corporation's administration of AHODP, including a 1990s review of program implementation and a 2009 audit of “Homebuyer Selection and Approval,” likewise found that the program was generally meeting its objectives but recommended stronger documentation of eligibility determinations and more consistent oversight of local sponsors.

The program has also been cited in broader analyses of affordable housing policy in New York State as one of several state-level tools for supporting homeownership and neighborhood reinvestment, alongside rental housing and community development initiatives administered by HCR.

== See also ==
- New York State Affordable Housing Corporation
- New York State Homes and Community Renewal
- New York State Housing Finance Agency
- New York State Housing Trust Fund Corporation
