= New York State Affordable Housing Corporation =

Public-benefit corporation in New York (state)

Public-benefit corporation overview
- Formed: 1985
- Jurisdiction: New York (state)
- Headquarters: 641 Lexington Avenue, New York City, New York, U.S.
- Parent Public-benefit corporation: New York State Housing Finance Agency; New York State Homes and Community Renewal
- Key document: Private Housing Finance Law § 45-b
- Website: hcr.ny.gov/affordable-housing-corporation-0

The New York State Affordable Housing Corporation (AHC) is a New York State public-benefit corporation and a subsidiary of the New York State Housing Finance Agency (HFA). It was created in 1985 under section 45-b of the state Private Housing Finance Law to administer the Affordable Home Ownership Development Program, a state-funded grant program that promotes homeownership among low- and moderate-income households by subsidizing the construction, acquisition, rehabilitation, and improvement of owner-occupied housing across New York State.

== History and legal status ==
AHC was established in 1985 under section 45-b of the Private Housing Finance Law to administer the Affordable Home Ownership Development Program established under Article 19 of the law. The corporation is authorized to provide financial assistance, in conjunction with other public and private investments, for the acquisition, construction, rehabilitation, and improvement of owner-occupied housing for low- and moderate-income households.

AHC is organized as a public-benefit corporation of the State of New York and is a subsidiary of the New York State Housing Finance Agency. It is a component unit in the State's financial statements rather than in HFA's consolidated financial statements. The chair and members of the HFA board also serve as the members of AHC's board. AHC shares offices, administrative staff, and budgeting processes with HFA and related housing finance entities under the umbrella of the New York State Homes and Community Renewal (HCR).

== Programs ==
=== Affordable Home Ownership Development Program ===
AHC's principal program is the Affordable Home Ownership Development Program. It provides grants to municipalities, municipal housing authorities, housing development fund companies, and eligible not-for-profit or charitable organizations to subsidize the creation or improvement of owner-occupied housing. Grants support new construction, acquisition and rehabilitation of homes for resale, or improvements to existing owner-occupied homes. Grants are awarded to sponsoring organizations rather than directly to individual homebuyers or homeowners, and the sponsors are responsible for verifying household eligibility.

For fiscal year 2026–2027, AHC announced that $26 million was available through the program. The maximum grant was $75,000 per housing unit using a tiered award structure based on the depth or duration of affordability. Applications were accepted on a rolling basis until the available funds were fully allocated.

The program operates statewide, with grantees in each of New York's ten economic regions, including New York City, Long Island, the Mid-Hudson region, and upstate metropolitan and rural areas.

=== Special initiatives ===
Additionally, AHC has administered targeted initiatives authorized by state appropriations. These include the Lake Ontario Homeowner Recovery Assistance Program, created after 2017 flooding along Lake Ontario and the St. Lawrence River, and the Buffalo East Homeowner Improvement Program (BEHIP), which assists homeowners in East Buffalo with emergency repairs.

By the end of fiscal year 2024, more than $95 million in combined state appropriations and repayment funds had been set aside or expended for the Lake Ontario flood-recovery program. Dedicated funding had also been allocated for BEHIP grants administered through local partners in Buffalo.

== Finance and administration ==
AHC is funded primarily through annual appropriations from the New York State Legislature, which the corporation uses to award housing grants. It also receives repayments and recaptured funds from prior grants, as well as investment income on the unspent cash balances.

For the fiscal year ended March 31, 2026, the State appropriated $26 million to AHC. Using current and prior-year appropriations together with repayments and recaptured funds, the corporation approved approximately $42.7 million in awards to create or renovate 1,096 units of affordable housing for low- and moderate-income households. Awards were made in all ten economic regions of New York State.

The value of awards increased by approximately 21 percent from $35.2 million during fiscal year 2024–2025, primarily because of differences between the timing of state appropriations and the approval of individual awards. As of March 31, 2026, AHC had approximately $109 million in commitments under approved grant agreements, which were expected to be funded over several years.

Administrative services—including staff, finance, procurement, and internal audit—are provided under a shared-services arrangement with HFA and related entities. Most administrative expenses are budgeted and processed through HFA's operating fund and then allocated among the agencies.

== Audits and oversight ==
AHC is subject to financial-statement audits and performance audits. Its annual financial statements are audited by independent public accountants in accordance with U.S. generally accepted accounting principles and Government Auditing Standards.

In 2009, the New York State Comptroller issued an audit titled Homebuyer Selection and Approval that examined a sample of Affordable Home Ownership Development Program grants to determine whether homebuyers met income and asset eligibility requirements. The audit identified recipients who exceeded program limits or whose eligibility was not adequately documented, and recommended stronger oversight, improved documentation, and additional guidance for local grant managers.

A 2011 follow-up review reported that AHC had fully implemented five of the audit's six recommendations and had partially implemented the remaining recommendation.

In 2014, the Comptroller audited eight metropolitan-area projects administered through the Affordable Home Ownership Development Program. The audit found that most of the recipients reviewed met the program's income and asset requirements, but identified two recipients who exceeded liquid-asset limits and one additional award where eligibility could not be confirmed. It recommended clearer guidance, additional training, and continued monitoring of local grant managers.

== See also ==
- New York State Homes and Community Renewal
- New York State Housing Finance Agency
- New York State Housing Trust Fund Corporation
- Homeless Housing and Assistance Corporation
- State of New York Mortgage Agency
