= New York State Executive Department =

Department of the New York state government

Executive Department

Department overview
- Jurisdiction: New York
- Department executive: Kathy Hochul, Governor of New York
- Key document: Executive Law

The New York State Executive Department of the New York state government serves as the administrative department of the governor of New York. This department has no central operating structure; it consists of a number of divisions, offices, boards, commissions, councils, and other independent agencies that provide policy advice and assistance to the governor and conduct activities according to statute or executive order. Its regulations are compiled in title 9 of the New York Codes, Rules and Regulations.

== History ==
At the time of the New York's 1920s constitutional reforms, the Executive Department—headed by the Governor—housed only a few core functions such as budgeting, procurement, the state police and military and naval affairs. Since that time, numerous agencies have been created within the Executive Department to accommodate governmental functions not anticipated in the 1920s, while conforming with the limits established by the Constitution. These additions include divisions and offices that do not logically fit into the framework of the other departments, such as the Department of Veterans' Services (which advises veterans on services, benefits and entitlements, and administers payments of bonuses and annuities to blind veterans) and the Office of General Services (which provides centralized data processing, construction, maintenance and design services as well as printing, transportation and communication systems).

== List of divisions, etc. ==
Some of the divisions, offices, boards, commissions, councils, and other independent agencies that are part of the New York State Executive Department are the:

- New York State Homes and Community Renewal (HCR)
  - New York State Division of Housing and Community Renewal (DHCR)
    - New York State Office of Rent Administration (ORA)
  - State of New York Mortgage Agency (SONYMA)
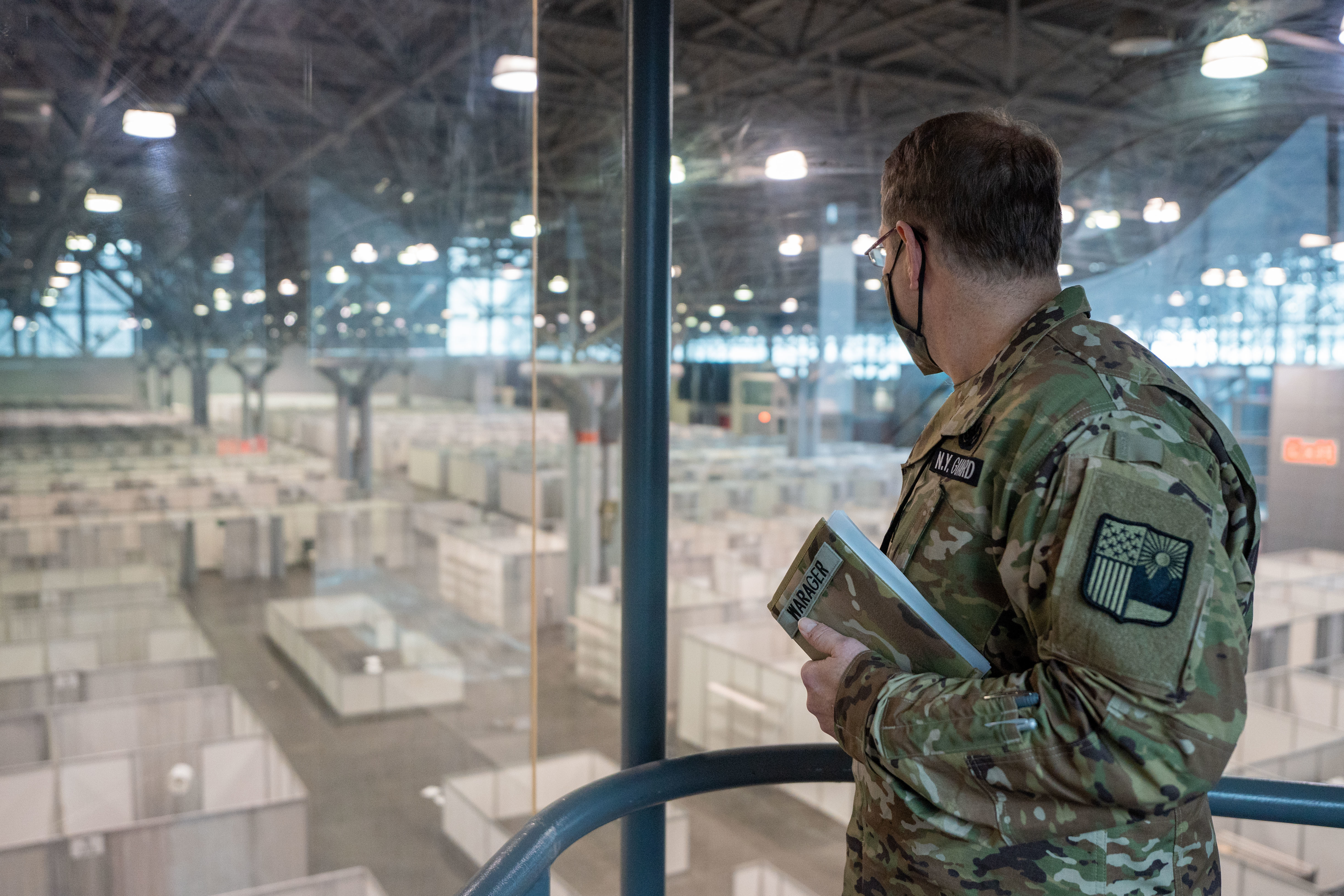
    The commander of the New York Guard state defense force visits with volunteers serving with the New York National Guard's incident command post
  - New York State Housing Finance Agency (HFA)
- New York State Division of Homeland Security and Emergency Services (DHSES)
- New York State Division of Human Rights
- New York State Division of Alcoholic Beverage Control
  - New York Office of Cannabis Management
- New York State Board of Elections
- New York State Office of General Services
- New York State Office of Information Technology Services
- New York State Office of Parks, Recreation and Historic Preservation
- Adirondack Park Agency
- New York State Office for the Aging

Crime control

- New York State Police
- New York State Commission of Correction
- New York State Division of Criminal Justice Services
- New York State Division of Military and Naval Affairs
- New York State Gaming Commission
- New York State Office of Victim Services
- New York State Inspector General
