= New York State Community Land Trust Support Program =

New York State initiatives supporting community land trusts

New York State Community Land Trust Program
- Formation: 2017
- Founder: Office of the New York State Attorney General; Enterprise Community Partners
- Type: State-supported housing initiatives
- Purpose: Support and expansion of community land trusts
- Headquarters: Albany, New York
- Region served: New York State
- Parent organization: New York State Homes and Community Renewal; New York State Attorney General
- Website: hcr.ny.gov/community-land-trust-support-program

The New York State Community Land Trust Program refers to a set of grant, loan, and capacity-building initiatives supported by New York State agencies and partner organizations to strengthen community land trusts (CLTs). These initiatives include the Community Land Trust Initiative and Community Land Trust Capacity Building Initiative created by the New York State Attorney General and Enterprise Community Partners, the Community Land Trust Loan Fund administered through New York State Homes and Community Renewal (HCR), and a Community Land Trust Support Program operated by the Housing Trust Fund Corporation within HCR.

Collectively, these programs provide operating support, technical assistance, grants and low-interest loans to CLTs to facilitate the acquisition and rehabilitation of properties, preserve long-term affordability, and build organizational capacity. By the mid-2020s, Enterprise Community Partners reported that New York State had more than 25 CLTs, the third-largest concentration in the United States.

== Background ==
Community land trusts are nonprofit, community-based organizations that hold land in trust for the benefit of a defined geographic community and typically lease sites to households or organizations that own the buildings on that land. CLTs are used to secure permanently affordable housing, prevent displacement, and support community-led development.

In New York, CLTs exist in multiple forms, including neighborhood-based trusts in New York City and regional CLTs in places such as Long Island, Albany and Tompkins County. State officials and housing advocates have described CLTs as one tool for responding to speculation, gentrification and the scarcity of affordable housing.

== Operational CLTs in New York State ==
New York State has one of the largest community land trust sectors in the United States. A 2025 highlight from Enterprise Community Partners reported that the state had "over 25 community land trusts," the third-largest number of CLTs nationally.

In New York City, CLTs are supported in part through the NYC Community Land Initiative (NYCCLI), an alliance of social-justice and affordable-housing organizations that promotes community land trusts and other forms of community-controlled development. Examples of CLTs elsewhere in the state include City Roots Community Land Trust in Rochester and Albany Community Land Trust in Albany, both of which steward permanently affordable housing and community assets in their respective cities.

The New York State Community Land Trust Program, administered by the New York State Housing Trust Fund Corporation within New York State Homes and Community Renewal, provides operating and capacity-building funds to support the work and long-term sustainability of new and existing CLTs in this statewide ecosystem.

== Attorney General–Enterprise initiatives ==
=== Community Land Trust Initiative and Capacity Building Initiative ===
In 2017, the Office of the New York State Attorney General and Enterprise Community Partners launched the Community Land Trust Initiative, using funds from legal settlements with financial institutions following the 2008 financial crisis.

The program provided approximately US$3.5 million in grants to support the formation and early operations of six CLTs in New York City, Albany, Suffolk County and Nassau County. Grants were used for activities such as planning, community organizing, property acquisition and early-stage project development.

In 2019, Attorney General Letitia James announced a second round of funding under what was described as the Community Land Trust Capacity Building Initiative, again in partnership with Enterprise. Press releases from the Attorney General's office described these grants as a continuation of the 2017 initiative and noted that the program had leveraged the initial state investment into tens of millions of dollars in permanent affordable housing investment and hundreds of permanently affordable units.

According to Enterprise and independent evaluations, the Attorney General–Enterprise initiatives helped seed new CLTs, expand existing ones and support activities such as homeowner training, acquisition and rehabilitation of properties and the development of permanently affordable rental and ownership housing.

== Community Land Trust Loan Fund ==
The Community Land Trust Loan Fund is a revolving loan program administered through New York State Homes and Community Renewal and capitalized in part by the State of New York Mortgage Agency's (SONYMA) Community Restoration Fund. It provides low-interest loans to community land trusts in New York State to acquire and rehabilitate one- to four-family homes and other small properties, with the aim of creating permanently affordable homeownership opportunities and stabilizing neighborhoods affected by foreclosure and disinvestment.

An article in Long Island Business News reported that the Long Island Housing Partnership's regional CLT was leveraging US$333,333 from the Community Land Trust Loan Fund, along with other public and private subsidies, to acquire and replace storm-damaged homes in Nassau and Suffolk counties with new, FEMA-compliant houses kept affordable through the CLT structure.

Enterprise Community Partners has described the Loan Fund as a statewide resource for CLTs that complements the Attorney General's grant initiatives by providing acquisition and construction financing that can be recycled as projects are completed and loans are repaid.

== Community Land Trust Support Program ==
The Community Land Trust Support Program is a grant program administered by the New York State Housing Trust Fund Corporation (HTFC), a subsidiary of New York State Homes and Community Renewal. It was created with a US$1.5 million appropriation in HCR's fiscal year 2026 budget to support the operations and long-term sustainability of community land trusts in New York City that meet the definition of a CLT under the New York City Charter.

According to HCR, the program provides two-year contracts offering operating and program support to qualifying CLTs whose primary purpose is to create and preserve permanently affordable housing and related community assets on community-controlled land. Eligible uses of funds include staffing, organizational development, community engagement, pre-development activities and other costs associated with acquiring, stewarding and developing CLT properties.

The program has been described by Enterprise Community Partners as part of a broader effort to "equip New York's community land trusts for long-term success" by pairing operating support with training, technical assistance and access to loan capital.

== Administration and partners ==
New York's community land trust initiatives involve multiple public and nonprofit entities:

- The Office of the New York State Attorney General provides funding from legal settlements and oversees the Community Land Trust Initiative and subsequent CLT Capacity Building Initiative in partnership with Enterprise Community Partners.
- New York State Homes and Community Renewal, through HTFC and SONYMA, administers the Community Land Trust Loan Fund and the Community Land Trust Support Program.
- Enterprise Community Partners serves as an intermediary, managing grant programs, providing technical assistance and convening training for CLTs across the state.

These state-level initiatives operate alongside municipal efforts, particularly in New York City, where the New York City Department of Housing Preservation and Development and City Council have provided funding and policy support for CLTs within the city.

== See also ==
- Community land trust
- New York State Homes and Community Renewal
- New York State Housing Trust Fund Corporation
- State of New York Mortgage Agency
