= F.N. Burt Company Factory =

Historic place in New York, United States

- U.S. National Register of Historic Places
- New York State Register of Historic Places
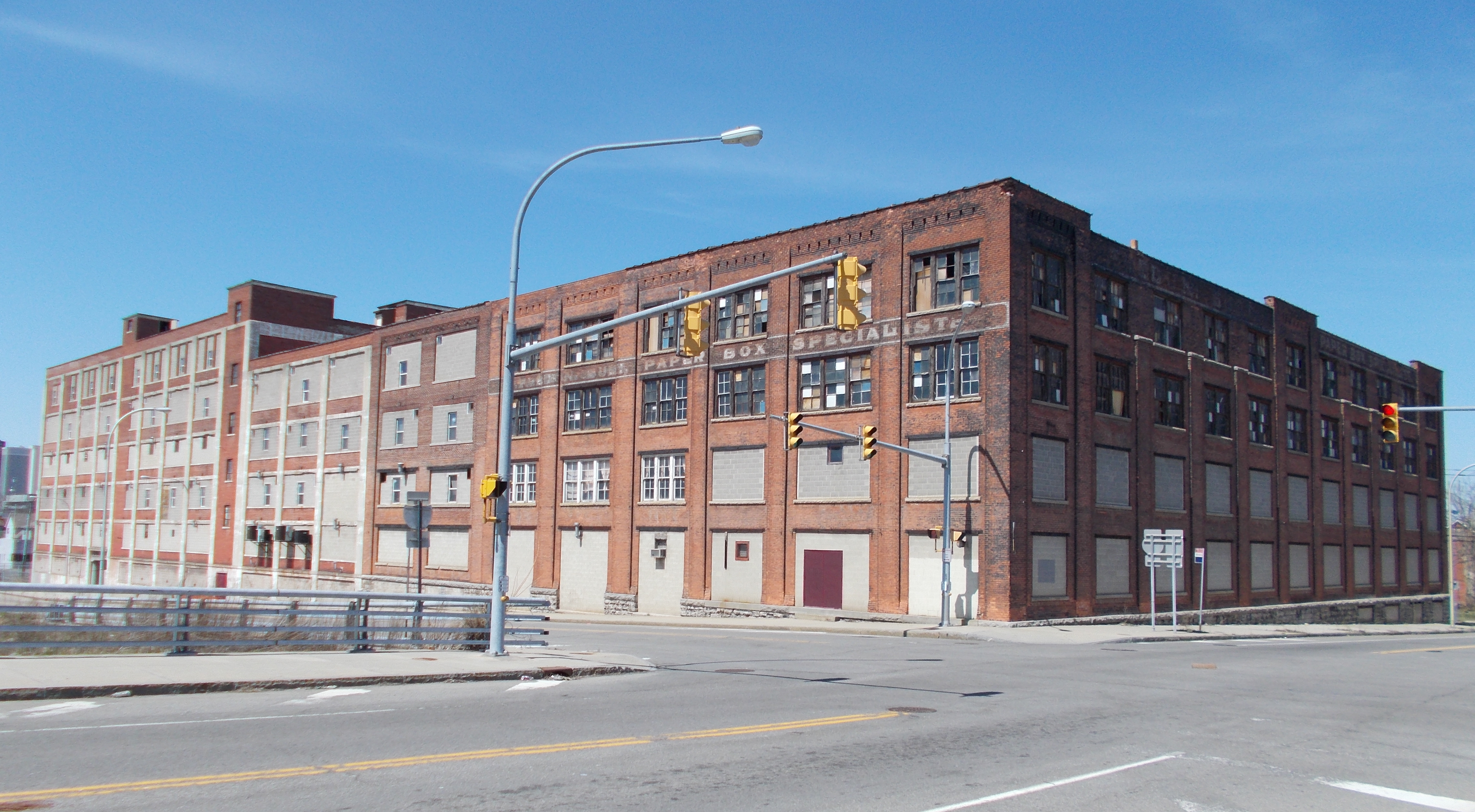
- F.N. Burt Company Factory, April 2013

- Location within New York Location within the United States
- Location: 500 Seneca Street, Buffalo, New York
- Coordinates: 42°52′40″N 78°51′26″W
- Area: 1.88 acres (0.76 ha)
- Built: c. 1901-1926
- Built by: Niederpruem & Co.
- Architects: Plumer & Mann
- Architectural style: Daylight factory
- MPS: Historic Resources of the Hydraulics / Larkin Neighborhood MPS
- NRHP reference No.: 13000053
- NYSRHP No.: 02940.017591

Significant dates
- Added to NRHP: March 6, 2013
- Designated NYSRHP: January 7, 2013

F.N. Burt Company Factory is a historic former box factory complex located at Buffalo in Erie County, New York. Another factory operated by F.N. Burt in Buffalo was the F.N. Burt Company Factory "C".

== History ==
The original section of the building was built in 1901, with additions made through 1926. It is an example of daylight factory design. The four- to six-story building is constructed of brick and reinforced concrete. The company moved to Cheektowaga, New York in 1959.

The building is visible from the I-190 and occupies nearly the full block bound by Myrtle Avenue and Hamburg, Spring and Seneca streets.

It was listed on the National Register of Historic Places in 2013.

== Present day ==
Developers under the legal entity 500 Seneca LLC (consisting of FFZ Holdings and Savarino Development Corp.) purchased the vacant structure from New Era Cap Company in March 2010. New Era moved out in 2004 when it consolidated its local manufacturing facilities at a plant in Derby, New York. The building underwent a $35,000,000 renovation into 195,000 square feet of unique Class A office space and 110,000 square feet of dedicated below market space for community and/or cultural organizations. The building features an enclosed exterior courtyard and expansive interior "green" atrium. The site also includes adjacent surface parking. In addition to commercial space, the building will feature 110 residential units.

The project was designed by Chaintreuil/Jensen/Stark Architects LLP and Tredo Engineers. It was being funded through state and federal historic tax credits, state brownfields tax credits, and money from the Community Preservation Corp., with a financing guarantee from the State of New York Mortgage Agency.

== Tenants ==
Once opened in 2015, tenants at the 306,000 square foot 500 Seneca Street building will include:

- ABC-Amega Inc.- largest tenant on the fourth floor
- Frontier Industrial Services and Frontier Group of Companies
- Buffalo Collaborative Opportunities & Management Enterprises (BCOME) Buffalo job training program
- Oracle - 6,000 square feet on the fifth floor
- Leadership Buffalo - up to 2,500 square feet on the fifth floor
- Bene-Care Agency - 4,000 square feet on the third floor
- Nervve Technologies
- Liberty Mutual - 13,000 square feet of space on the third floor
- Tommyrotters Distillery - 5,000 square feet on the first floor
- Provident Funding
- FourthIdea - Advertising and Design Agency on the Fifth Floor
- B. Layne Creations an Eco-Transformations Studio 697 square feet on the fifth floor, open to the public December 14, 2015

== See also ==
- National Register of Historic Places listings in Buffalo, New York
