= New York State Housing Trust Fund Corporation =

New York State public-benefit corporation

Public-benefit corporation overview
- Formed: 1985
- Jurisdiction: New York (state)
- Headquarters: Albany, New York
- Parent Public-benefit corporation: New York State Housing Finance Agency
- Key document: Private Housing Finance Law § 45-a
- Website: Official website

The New York State Housing Trust Fund Corporation (HTFC) is a New York State public-benefit corporation and a subsidiary of the New York State Housing Finance Agency (HFA). It was established in 1985 by the addition of section 45-a to the New York State Private Housing Finance Law as a "housing trust fund corporation" to administer a low-income housing trust fund program.

HTFC operates within New York State Homes and Community Renewal (HCR) and finances the construction, rehabilitation, and preservation of affordable housing, as well as community development activities, through a portfolio of state and federal programs.

== History and legal status ==
HTFC was created as part of Chapter 67 of the Laws of 1985, which added section 45-a to the Private Housing Finance Law and established the corporation as a subsidiary public-benefit corporation of the New York State Housing Finance Agency. This authorized HFA to transfer property to HTFC in order to carry out a low-income housing trust fund program, and granted the corporation typical public authority powers such as entering into contracts, adopting by-laws, and investing its funds.

The initial mission of HTFC was to create affordable housing for low-income households by providing loans and grants for the rehabilitation of existing housing and the construction of new housing under the Low Income Housing Trust Fund Program. Over time, additional state and federal housing and community development programs were assigned to HTFC, and its programs are administered within the broader HCR structure.

== Governance ==
Under section 45-a of the Private Housing Finance Law, the membership of HTFC consists of the Commissioner of Housing and Community Renewal, who also serves as chairperson, the chair of HFA, and one additional member appointed by the chairperson of HTFC. Guidance issued by the New York State Office of the State Comptroller describes HTFC as an unconsolidated subsidiary corporation of HFA whose membership follows this statutory structure and which employs its own staff.

As part of New York State Homes and Community Renewal, HTFC is subject to oversight by the New York State Authorities Budget Office and to periodic financial and performance audits by the Office of the State Comptroller.

== Programs and activities ==
=== Low Income Housing Trust Fund Program ===
HTFC's original and flagship program is the Low Income Housing Trust Fund Program, which provides financing for the construction, rehabilitation, and preservation of housing for low-income households. Funds may be used to rehabilitate vacant or under-utilized residential property or to convert non-residential buildings to residential use for occupancy by low-income homesteaders, tenants, tenant-cooperators, or condominium owners.

=== Community Land Trust Support Program ===
HTFC administers the New York State Community Land Trust Support Program, which uses state appropriations to support the operations and long-term sustainability of new and existing community land trusts in New York State.

=== Other state-funded programs ===
In addition to the Low Income Housing Trust Fund, HTFC administers several state-funded programs that support housing and community revitalization, including the New York Main Street Program, the Urban Initiatives Program, and repair or rehabilitation programs for owner-occupied homes.

=== Federal programs ===
HTFC also serves as the administering entity for several federal housing and community development programs on behalf of New York State. These include the HOME Investment Partnerships Program—administered through the New York State HOME Program—and the Small Cities Community Development Block Grant (CDBG) program. HTFC is also contract administrator for certain project-based Section 8 rental assistance and other federally funded housing programs.

Audits conducted by the New York State Office of the State Comptroller have reviewed HTFC's administration of programs such as the Rural Rental Assistance Program, the HOME and CDBG programs, and various Section 8 and emergency repair programs.

== Relationship to other housing entities ==
HTFC is one of several housing-related public-benefit corporations linked to HFA and administered under New York State Homes and Community Renewal. Related entities include the New York State Affordable Housing Corporation, which focuses on homeownership assistance, and the Homeless Housing and Assistance Corporation, which funds housing for homeless individuals and families.

== See also ==
- New York State Housing Finance Agency
- New York State Homes and Community Renewal
