= 80/20 =

80/20 or 80-20 may refer to:

- 80/20 housing, housing of which 20% is "affordable", encouraged by regulation in the U.S.
- 80-20 rule or the Pareto principle
- 80-20 Initiative, an Asian American political organization
- 80/20 Thinking, a UK Privacy consultancy firm
- T-slot structural framing, a framing system sometimes known as "80/20 framing" (80 by 20 mm) after one manufacturer

== See also ==
- 20/80 (disambiguation)
