= 3333 =

3333 may refer to:

- 3333 Schaber, an asteroid discovered in 1980
- 3333, a year in the 4th millennium
- 3333 BC, a year in the 34th century BC
- Riverside Park Community, an apartment complex in New York City located at 3333 Broadway
- Evergrande Group stock ticker
