= Homeless Housing and Assistance Corporation =

Public-benefit corporation in New York State

Public-benefit corporation overview
- Formed: June 8, 1990
- Jurisdiction: New York (state)
- Headquarters: Albany, New York
- Public-benefit corporation executive: Barbara C. Guinn, Chair
- Parent Public-benefit corporation: New York State Housing Finance Agency
- Website: otda.ny.gov/programs/housing/hhap.asp

The Homeless Housing and Assistance Corporation (HHAC) is a public-benefit corporation of the state of New York that finances the development of housing for people who are homeless or at risk of homelessness. It was created in 1990 as a subsidiary of the New York State Housing Finance Agency (HFA) and is authorized to administer the state's Homeless Housing and Assistance Program (HHAP).

Through HHAP, the corporation provides capital grants and loans to not-for-profit corporations, charitable and religious organizations, municipalities, and public corporations to acquire, construct, or rehabilitate housing used as emergency shelters, transitional housing, or permanent supportive housing for homeless people. In the fiscal year ended March 31, 2025, HHAC reported total operating expenses of about US$169.3 million, primarily related to HHAP projects.

== History ==
New York's Homeless Housing and Assistance Program was created in 1983 by Title 1 of Article 2-A of the Social Services Law to provide capital grants and loans for the acquisition, construction, and rehabilitation of housing for homeless persons. The program supports permanent supportive housing, transitional housing, and certain shelter facilities across the state.

Chapter 215 of the Laws of 1990 established the Homeless Housing and Assistance Corporation as a public-benefit corporation and codified it in the New York State Private Housing Finance Law as section 45-c. Under this legislation, HHAC was defined as a subsidiary of the New York State Housing Finance Agency and was authorized to administer HHAP and to utilize the proceeds of bonds issued by HFA to provide capital funding for eligible projects.

State budget and appropriations bills provide capital funding for HHAP through a dedicated Homeless Housing and Assistance Account and authorize transfers from the State of New York Mortgage Agency’s Mortgage Insurance Fund to HHAC. The Governor's FY 2024 Executive Budget, for example, continued US$128 million in capital funding for HHAP.

== Organization and governance ==
HHAC is a component unit of the state of New York and a subsidiary of the New York State Housing Finance Agency. It has no employees of its own; administration of the corporation and of HHAP is carried out by staff of the New York State Office of Temporary and Disability Assistance (OTDA).

The corporation is governed by a small board of directors that includes the OTDA Commissioner, who serves as chair, and the president of HFA. As of 2025, the OTDA Commissioner is Barbara C. Guinn. HHAC's offices are located with OTDA's central office in Albany, New York.

== Programs and activities ==
HHAC's principal responsibility is administering the capital side of the Homeless Housing and Assistance Program. HHAP provides state capital grants and loans to fund the acquisition, construction, or rehabilitation of housing to be used as emergency shelters, transitional housing, or permanent supportive housing for individuals and families who are homeless or unable to secure adequate housing without special assistance.

Eligible applicants include not-for-profit corporations, charitable and religious organizations, municipalities, and other public corporations. Projects may range from small supportive housing residences to larger developments combining affordable apartments with on-site social services. Examples of projects financed with HHAP and monitored in collaboration with HHAC include Liberty Landing Apartments for homeless veterans on Long Island and Ebenezer Square Apartments in Erie County, which combines affordable apartments with a licensed residential program for adults with psychiatric disabilities.

Local governments and nonprofit providers across New York use HHAP and HHAC financing to create or expand supportive housing and shelter capacity, including county-level initiatives to convert or construct facilities for single adults and families experiencing homelessness.

In the fiscal year ended March 31, 2025, HHAC's audited financial statements reported total operating expenses of approximately US$169.3 million, an increase from about US$142.5 million in the prior year, reflecting higher grant and program spending under HHAP.

== Audits and criticism ==
The Homeless Housing and Assistance Corporation and the Homeless Housing and Assistance Program have been the subject of oversight by the New York State Office of the State Comptroller (OSC). A 2019 OSC audit of HHAP's project selection and maintenance found that the program generally funded viable projects and that projects visited by auditors were providing acceptable living conditions, but identified areas needing improvement, including delays in required monitoring inspections, delinquent annual reports from some providers, and weaknesses in the reliability of HHAP's project database.

In a follow-up report issued in 2020, OSC noted that HHAP officials had made progress in addressing these issues but that not all recommendations from the original audit had been fully implemented, particularly in the areas of timely inspections and improvements to the management information system used to track projects and reporting.

== See also ==
- Homelessness in New York (state)
- New York State Homes and Community Renewal
- New York State Office of Temporary and Disability Assistance
- New York State Housing Finance Agency
