= Albert A. Walsh =

Albert Anthony Walsh (1928–2002) was an American lawyer who served as the chair of the New York City Housing Authority (NYCHA) from October 31, 1967 to January 7, 1970.

== Early life and education ==
Born in Yonkers, New York, Walsh attended Cathedral High School in Manhattan and Charles E. Gorton High School in Yonkers. After one semester at Fordham College, he enlisted in the U.S. Navy and served aboard a submarine following World War II. He returned to Fordham University to complete his undergraduate degree and earned his law degree from Fordham Law School.

== Career ==
Walsh began in private practice and on Westchester County Republican campaigns before joining Governor Nelson Rockefeller's administration in 1959 as assistant counsel for the Division of Housing and Urban Renewal. He advanced to counsel and deputy commissioner, overseeing the state's low-rent and middle-income housing and urban renewal initiatives. In 1967, Mayor John V. Lindsay appointed him chair of the New York City Housing Authority, where he managed 157 developments housing over half a million tenants. He secured federal subsidies for both construction and operating costs and integrated social services into public housing.

In 1970, Walsh became the first head of the city's Housing and Development Administration, directing the creation of thousands of new apartment units. He served as president of the National Association of Housing and Redevelopment Officials (1971–72) and held board positions with the New York City Educational Construction Fund, the United Nations Development Corporation, and the Roosevelt Island Development Corporation.
