= 20/80 =

20/80 may refer to:

- 20–80 club, baseball feat
- Visual acuity

== See also ==
- 80/20 (disambiguation)
