= Alcohol laws of New York =

Laws concerning alcohol in the State of New York

Location of New York

Alcohol laws of New York (or commonly Alcohol Beverage Control Law) are a set of laws specific to manufacturing, purchasing, serving, selling, and consuming alcohol in the state of New York. Combined with federal and local laws, as well as vendor policies, alcohol laws of New York determine the state's legal drinking age, the driving under the influence limit, liquor license requirements, server training, and more.

== State Liquor Authority ==
New York State Liquor Authority

Agency overview
- Jurisdiction: New York
- Agency executive: Lily Fan, chair of the State Liquor Authority
- Parent department: New York State Executive Department
- Key document: Alcoholic Beverage Control Law
- Website: sla.ny.gov

The New York State Liquor Authority (NYSLA) and its agency arm, the Division of Alcoholic Beverage Control (DABC), were established under New York State Law in 1934 to "regulate and control the manufacture and distribution within the state of alcoholic beverages for the purpose of fostering and promoting temperance in their consumption and respect for and obedience to law." The SLA is also authorized by statute to "determine whether public convenience and advantage will be promoted by the issuance of licenses to traffic in alcoholic beverages … and to carry out the increase or decrease in the number thereof and the location of premises licensed … in the public interest."

The DABC is a division of the New York State Executive Department.

== For consumption on-premises ==
In New York, for purposes of state law, there are only four hours Monday through Saturday in which alcohol may not be served: 4:00 a.m. to 8:00 a.m. On Sundays the limitation is six hours: 4:00 a.m. to 10:00 a.m. This was designed to accommodate both New York City nightlife and late-night workers statewide. Some upstate areas such as Buffalo, Albany, and Saratoga Springs retain the 4:00 a.m closing time, although individual counties are free to set an earlier "last call". In Binghamton, this is at 3:00 a.m.; in Syracuse, Plattsburgh, Oneonta, Rochester and Watertown, bars close at 2:00 a.m.; and Elmira, Geneva, and Ithaca, have some of the earliest closing times in the state at 1 a.m. For a complete list of closing hours by county, see.

=== B.Y.O. Policy ===
The SLA does not permit establishments to allow patrons to bring their own alcohol if the establishment does not have a license or permit to sell alcoholic beverages. The only exception to this rule is that establishments with fewer than 20 seats can permit B.Y.O.B. Nonetheless, the SLA does not have authority to take any direct action against an establishment that is not licensed with the SLA unless the establishment is currently applying, or will apply in the future, for a liquor license.

=== Research ===
Research has been conducted into the association between closing times and crime in New York. Counties with later closing times tend to have greater rates of violent crime (except gun violence), but not non-violent crime. This was true even after adjusting for socio-demographic factors.

== For consumption off-premises ==
Only liquor stores may obtain a license to sell liquor for off-premises consumption. Grocery and drug stores may obtain a license to sell beer alone or beer and "wine products", such as wine coolers (but not wine). Minors visiting a liquor store must be accompanied by an adult at all times; a violation can lead to the owner or manager being charged with second-degree unlawfully dealing with a minor, a Class B misdemeanor.

Until the mid-2000s, sales of beer before noon on Sundays for off-premises consumption were prohibited statewide, a remnant of a royal decree during the Colonial era, and between 3–6 a.m. any other day. Changes to the law made in the last years of Governor George Pataki's administration loosened those restrictions, and now beer sales are only prohibited from 3–8 a.m. Sundays. Counties are free to adjust those hours in either direction, all the way to midnight and noon, and allow 24-hour beer sales on other days of the week.

The law also changed for liquor stores. They may now open on Sundays (although not before noon) and in a 2022 change they may now open on Christmas should they choose to do so.

A few years after the Pataki administration changes, Governor David Paterson sought to allow supermarkets to sell wine. He argued that the increase in excise taxes collected would help the state close its budget deficit. The proposed law garnered so much opposition from liquor store owners that it was never voted on by either chamber of the New York State Legislature.

=== Ownership restrictions ===
New York law requires that every license to sell wine or spirits at retail for off-premises consumption be held by a single individual who lives within a few miles of the store and who holds no other such licenses in the state. It was intended to prevent any chain liquor stores from doing business in the state. Some proprietors open additional stores in the names of their family members while maintaining complete control over all the stores. Collaboration is not only limited to families; for example, Premier Group or Global Group in western New York has three locations, with each individually owned and operated.

== Dry communities ==
State law prohibits dry counties. Individual cities and towns may choose to be dry. In the case of towns, the decision would also be binding on any villages within them. Cities and towns may become totally dry, forbidding any on- or off-premises alcohol sales, or partially dry by forbidding one or the other or applying those prohibitions only to beer or to wine and spirits.

As of 2024, there are six dry towns in the state, all in lightly populated rural areas upstate:

- Caneadea in Allegany County
- Clymer in Chautauqua County
- Lapeer in Cortland County
- Orwell in Oswego County
- Fremont and Jasper in Steuben County
- Berkshire in Tioga County

Ten towns forbid on-premises consumption but allow off-premises purchases; four allow both only at a hotel open year round. Seventeen disallow only special on-premises consumption. The town of Spencer in Tioga County allows only off-premises and special on-premises consumption. Williamson, in Wayne County, bans on-premises sale of beer at race tracks, outdoor athletic fields, and sports stadia where admission is charged. In all, there are thirty-nine partially dry towns.

In 2019, the Town of Argyle in Washington County voted to repeal the town's dry status. Argyle had made 11 attempts prior to do so. As a result, there are now only six remaining dry towns in New York State.

== Drinking age ==
In response to the National Minimum Drinking Age Act in 1984, which reduced by up to 10% the federal highway funding of any state that did not have a minimum purchasing age of 21, the New York Legislature raised the drinking age from 19 to 21, effective December 1, 1985. (The drinking age had been 18 since 1933, before the first increase of the drinking age to 19 on December 4, 1982.) Persons under 21 are prohibited from purchasing alcohol or possessing alcohol with the intent to consume, unless the alcohol was given to that person by their parent or legal guardian. There is no law prohibiting persons under the age of 21 consuming alcohol that was given to them by their parent or legal guardian. Persons under 21 are prohibited from having a blood alcohol level of 0.02% or higher while driving.

== Drunken driving ==
Like every other state in the United States, driving under the influence is a crime in New York and is subject to a great number of regulations outside of the state's alcohol laws. New York's maximum blood alcohol level for driving is 0.08% for persons over the age of 16 and there is a "zero tolerance" policy for persons under 16. Minors caught with any alcohol in the blood (defined legally as 0.02% or more) are subject to license revocation for six months or more. Other penalties for drunken driving include fines, license suspension/revocation, possible imprisonment, and in some cases the implementation of an ignition interlock device. A lesser charge, driving with ability impaired (DWAI), may apply when a driver's BAC exceeds 0.05%.

=== Research ===
Research suggests that misdemeanor drunk driving offenses, but not felony drunk driving offenses, are related to county-based closing times for on-premises licensed venues.

== Public intoxication ==
New York State has no law against being intoxicated from alcohol in public, but there is a law prohibiting other substances. Any person found under the influence of a substance other than alcohol in public who is endangering themselves and others is guilty under the New York State Penal Code. This also applies to those found under the influence and bothering others or damaging public or private property.

Drinking in public was outlawed in New York City by Ed Koch in 1979. The law was originally pitched as targeting antisocial derelicts congregating in parks and on sidewalks, with Frederick E. Samuel, one of the measure's proponents in the New York City Council, stating "We do not recklessly expect the police to give a summons to a Con Ed worker having a beer with his lunch". By the end of the year similar laws had spread to municipalities in Westchester County. On March 7, 2016, drinking in public in Manhattan was decriminalized, but NYPD officers may still arrest an intoxicated individual on other charges.

== See also ==
- Sumptuary law
- Law of New York
