= New York State Office of Parks, Recreation and Historic Preservation =

New York state agency that operates state parks and historic sites

Agency overview
- Jurisdiction: New York
- Headquarters: 625 Broadway Albany, New York 12207; 42°39′09″N 73°44′55″W
- Employees: 1,981 permanent 4,500+ seasonal (2014)
- Annual budget: $385,693,500 USD (2014–15)
- Agency executive: Kathy Moser, Commissioner
- Parent department: Executive Department
- Key document: Parks, Recreation and Historic Preservation Law
- Website: parks.ny.gov

The New York State Office of Parks, Recreation and Historic Preservation (NYS OPRHP) is a state agency within the New York State Executive Department charged with the operation of state parks and historic sites within the U.S. state of New York. As of 2014, the NYS OPRHP manages nearly 335,000 acres (523 sq mi; 1,360 km^{2}) of public lands and facilities, including 180 state parks and 35 historic sites, that are visited by over 78 million visitors each year.

== History ==
The agency that would become the New York State Office of Parks, Recreation and Historic Preservation (NYS OPRHP) was created in 1970; however, the history of state parks and historic sites in New York stretches back to the latter part of the 19th century. Management of state-owned parks, and guidance for the entire state park system, was accomplished by various regional commissions, private organizations, statewide advisory councils, and divisions within other state agencies prior to the establishment of NYS OPRHP, which grew from the framework created by these earlier organizations.

=== Initial acquisitions ===
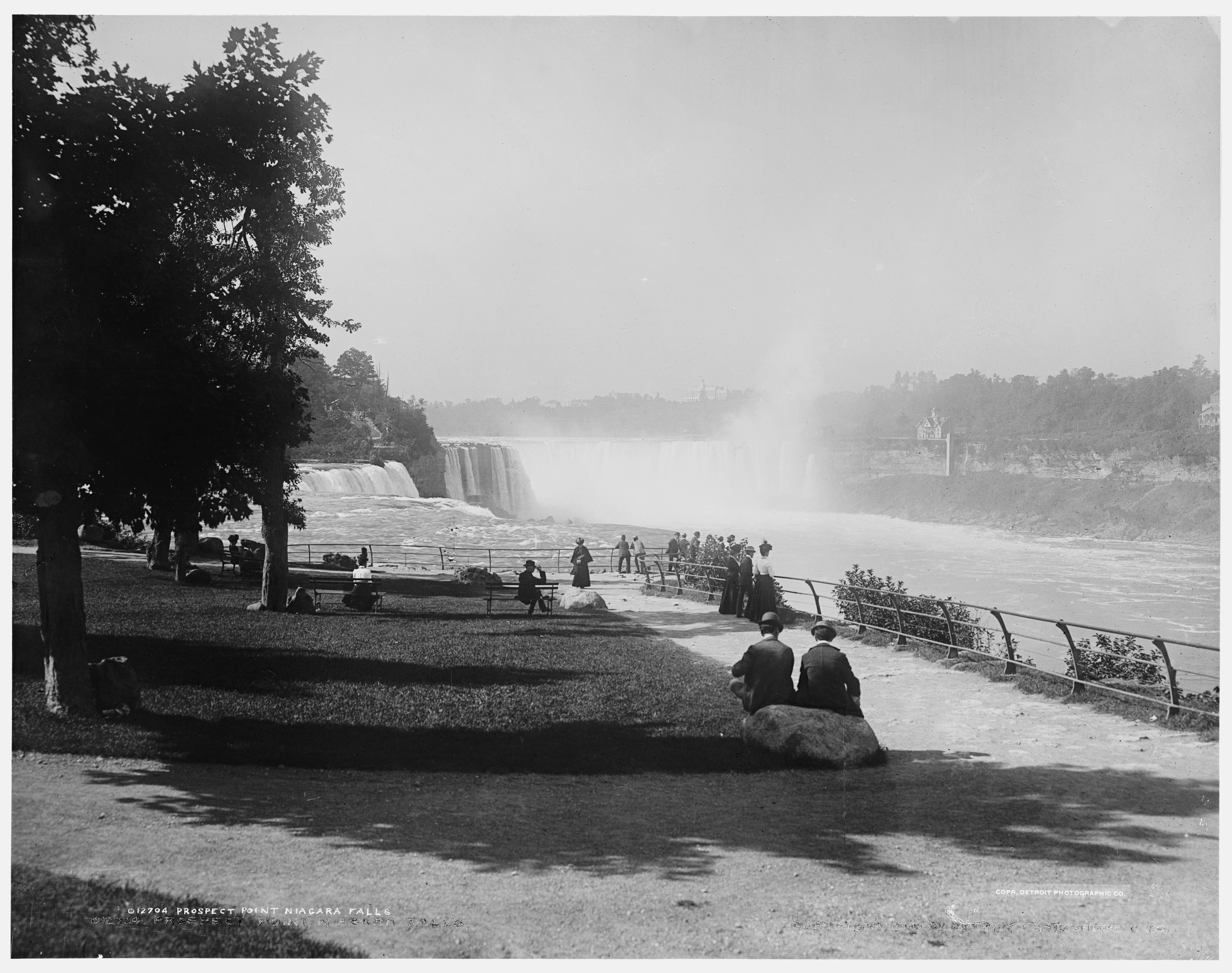
Prospect Point at the Niagara Reservation, c. 1900. The reservation, known today as Niagara Falls State Park, was the first park opened by New York State.

State-level procurement and management of parks in New York began in 1883, when then-governor Grover Cleveland signed legislation authorizing the appropriation of lands near Niagara Falls for a "state reservation". Two years later, the Niagara Reservation, known today as Niagara Falls State Park, opened to the public. The park is claimed to be the oldest state park in the United States, (Note: Although claimed as the oldest state park in the United States, Niagara Falls was not the first state-managed park. For a discussion of earlier state parks, see History of state parks in the United States.) and was the first established via eminent domain.

The State Reservation on the St. Lawrence was authorized in 1896. By 1898, it included modest state holdings in the Thousand Islands region of New York. During the early 20th century, the state continued to expand its public parks system with several large additions, including Letchworth State Park in 1906, Fire Island State Park (known today as Robert Moses State Park) in 1908, John Boyd Thacher State Park in 1914, Enfield Glen State Park (today's Robert H. Treman State Park) in 1920, and Allegany State Park in 1921. A coordinated effort to protect portions of the Hudson Palisades from the damaging effects of quarrying resulted in the creation of a number of state parks in the 1910s and 1920s, including Bear Mountain State Park and Harriman State Park.

=== NYS Council of Parks ===
Throughout these early acquisitions, the state lacked a formal statewide agency or organization to coordinate management and development of state parks. Instead, parks were managed by independent regional commissions, such as the Palisades Interstate Park Commission, or by organizations such as the American Scenic and Historic Preservation Society. To address the need for statewide coordination, the New York State Council of Parks was created by legislation adopted on April 18, 1924. The council served to plan development and set standard policies for all New York state-owned parks, reservations, and historic sites that were not under the authority of the New York State Conservation Commission (which notably included those lands that comprised the Forest Preserve in the Adirondacks and Catskills). Its formation was supported by governor Alfred E. Smith and based on plans by Robert Moses, who became the council's first commissioner; Moses would remain in charge of the council until 1963.

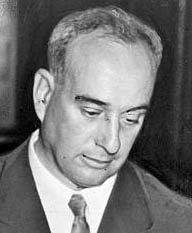
Robert Moses, who laid the groundwork for the State Council of Parks and led the council from 1924 to 1963

The council initially included representatives from regional park commissions and other organizations involved in park management, including the Conservation Commission and the American Scenic and Historic Preservation Society. Prior to the creation of the Division of Parks (see below), the State Council of Parks was the highest-level organization overseeing park management in the state.

Although it later became an advisory body, the council continues to this day, known officially as the New York State Council of Parks, Recreation and Historic Preservation. It includes representatives from the following departments and commissions as of 2014:

- New York State Office of Parks, Recreation and Historic Preservation
- New York State Department of Environmental Conservation
- New York State Board for Historic Preservation
- Allegany State Park Commission
- Central State Park Commission
- Finger Lakes State Park Commission
- Genesee State Park Commission
- Long Island State Park Commission
- New York City State Park Commission
- Niagara Frontier State Park Commission
- Palisades Interstate Park Commission
- Saratoga-Capital District State Park Commission
- Taconic State Park Commission
- Thousand Islands State Park Commission

=== NYS Conservation Department Division of Parks ===
A reorganization of New York's state government took place in 1926, which resulted in the creation of the New York State Conservation Department. The newly formed Conservation Department included a Division of Parks which assumed responsibility for management of New York's parks and historic sites. The Council of Parks continued as a constituent unit of the Division of Parks. The council was also at this time given the additional responsibility of planning highway improvements to enable access to park facilities.

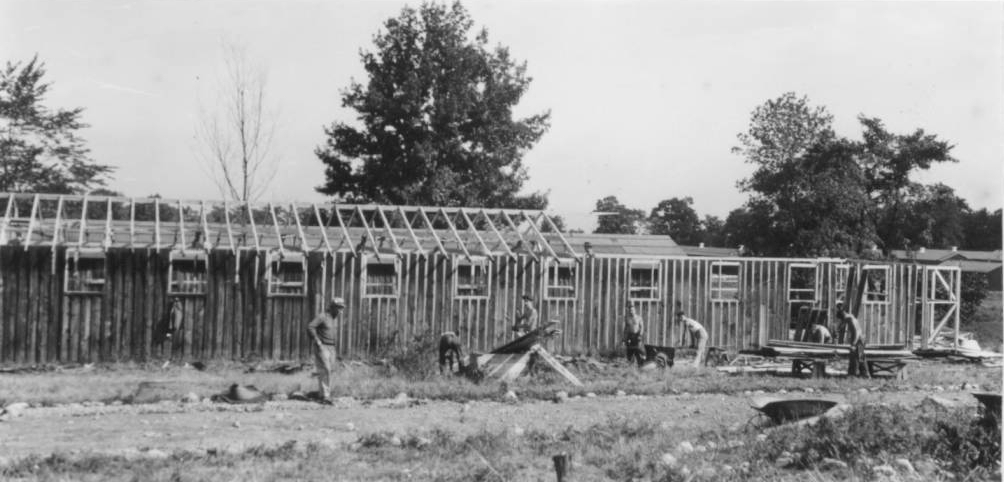
Workers completing a Civilian Conservation Corps barracks in 1934 at Green Lakes State Park in Fayetteville, New York

Although the Great Depression of the 1930s reduced available funding for New York's state parks, the period was a time of development of existing parks' facilities. Construction teams comprising workers employed through federal programs such as the Temporary Emergency Relief Administration, Civilian Conservation Corps, Civil Works Administration, and Works Progress Administration cleared woodlands, performed maintenance tasks, and built roads, trails, golf courses, buildings, and furniture for New York's parks through the 1930s and early 1940s.

As the Depression came to a close with the United States joining World War II in 1941, New York State was managing 74 parks welcoming a combined 20 million visitors annually. However, the Division of Parks' responsibilities were reduced in 1944 when 27 State Historic Sites were placed under the jurisdiction of the New York State Education Department. These sites were eventually returned to the Conservation Department in 1966; in the same year, the New York State Historic Trust (which later became the New York State Board for Historic Preservation) was created to help guide their management.

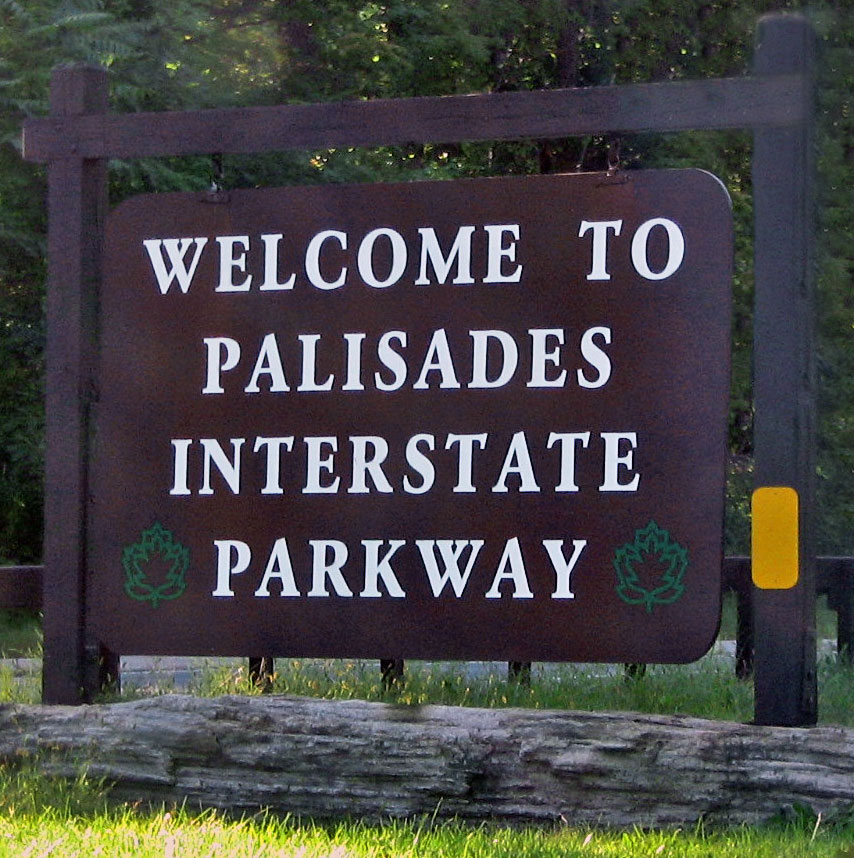
The Palisades Interstate Parkway was a priority project during the 1950s.

New York's park system continued expansion after World War II ended. The creation or completion of various parkways in the state, such as the Palisades Interstate Parkway and Lake Ontario Parkway, received priority during the 1950s. As visitation to New York's state parks increased following the war, new lands were sought for state parks, including unsuccessful attempts to expand into the Forest Preserve. Increased funding for parks made available in the 1960s did allow for the purchase of several large tracts throughout the state for parkland development. The state also began at this time to expand into new areas, such as an increase in boating facilities and establishment of parks within New York City.

=== NYS Office of Parks, Recreation and Historic Preservation ===
A major shift in New York's park management came in 1970 with legislation that created the New York State Department of Environmental Conservation, which was tasked with all responsibilities of the former Conservation Department, with the exception of managing the state's parks and historic sites outside of the Forest Preserve. The former Division of Parks was upgraded to become an independent agency, known as the New York State Office of Parks and Recreation. Legislation enacted in 1972 gave the agency direct control of New York's park lands, with the State Council of Parks and regional commissions retaining an advisory role in management. The agency's name was updated in 1981 to its current form, the New York State Office of Parks, Recreation and Historic Preservation (NYS OPRHP).

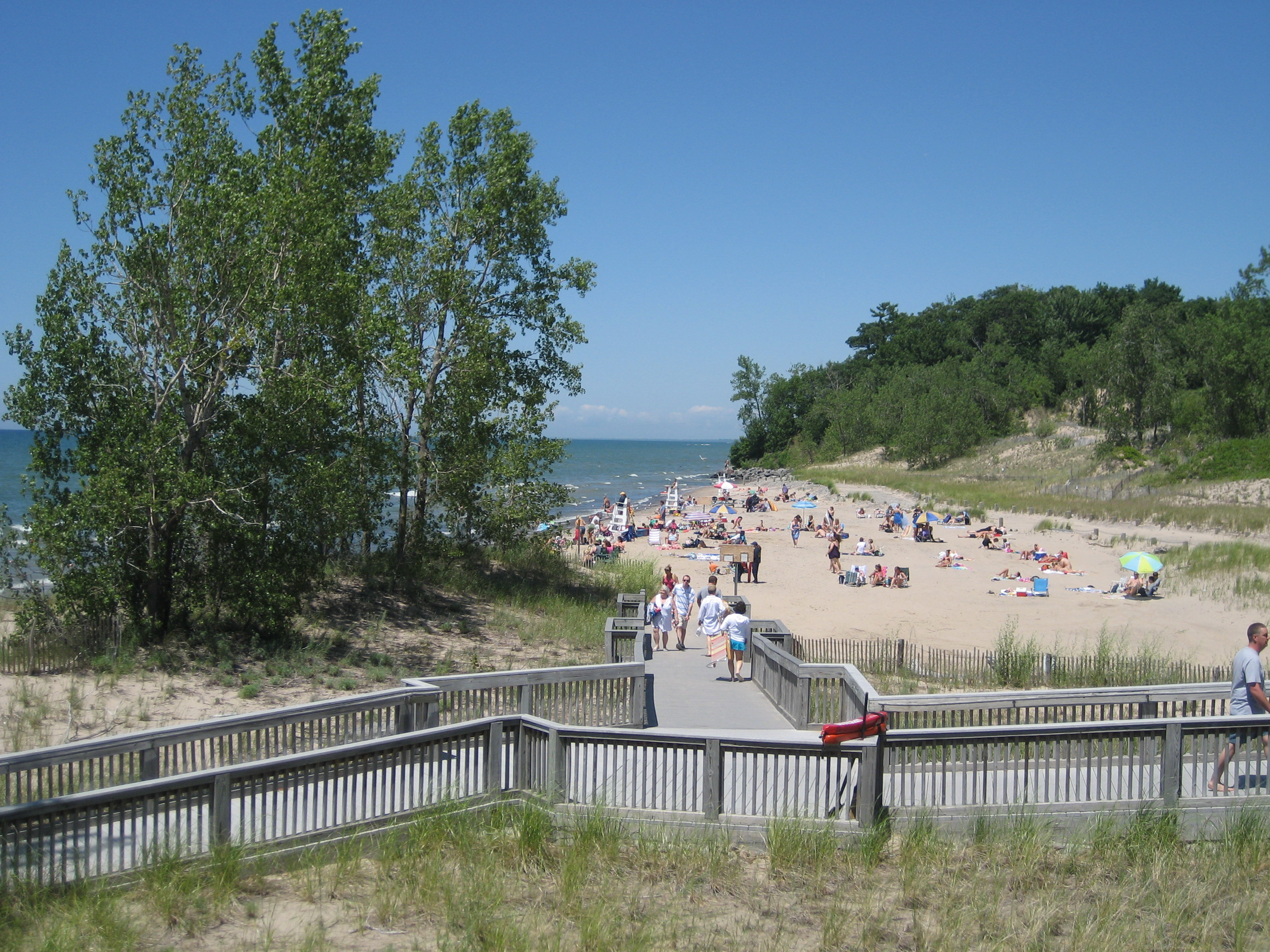
Sandy Island Beach State Park, opened in 2006, was one of many parks added to the state under Governor George Pataki.

The state park system underwent a period of rapid expansion during former governor George Pataki's administration. Between 1995 and 2007, Pataki, along with then-parks commissioner Bernadette Castro, opened 28 new state parks. Although the governor was lauded as a conservationist for his actions, the new parks increased financial burdens on the NYS OPRHP, whose funding for operations remained steady. In 2010, a statewide fiscal crisis led to an announcement that 55 state parks and historic sites would be closed. The threatened closures were eventually averted, with budget shortfalls made up through reduced staffing and hours at many parks, closure of some internal facilities such as campgrounds and golf courses, and increases in user fees.

The 2010 fiscal crisis resulted in decreased availability of funds for maintenance and upkeep at New York's parks. To help address an estimated $1 billion in needed repairs, $143 million in funds were made available in 2012; the money came from a combination of state, federal, and private grant sources. Sustained funding for repairs was announced in 2015, with the state planning to spend $900 million by 2020 at parks and historic sites throughout the state.

== Facilities ==
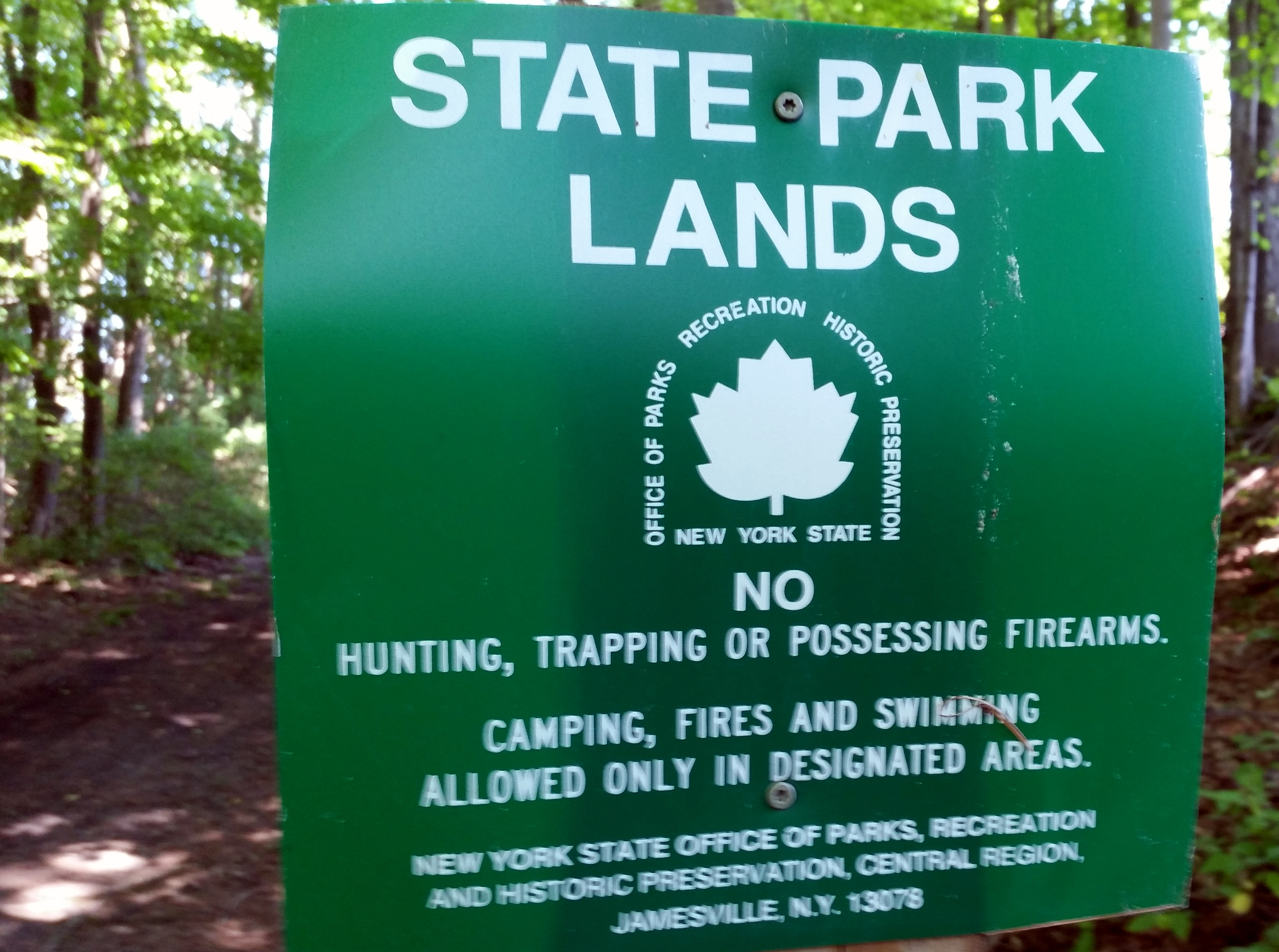
Link Trail, near Cazenovia, New York

As of 2014, the NYS OPRHP administered:

- 335,000 acres (523 sq mi; 1,360 km^{2}) of public land
- 180 state parks
- 35 state historic sites
- 67 developed beaches
- 36 swimming pools
- 27 marinas
- 40 boat launch sites
- 29 golf courses
- 817 cabins and rental houses
- 8,355 campsites
- 2,000 miles (3,200 km) of trails
- 18 nature centers

== State Park Police ==
New York State Park Police provides police services consistent with the Office of Parks, Recreation and Historic Preservation's mission to provide safe and enjoyable recreational opportunities for New York State residents and visitors. In addition, State Park Police assist park users, make arrests, conduct criminal and non-criminal investigations, and provide emergency services. New York State Park Police also provide special services including marine law enforcement and education duties on New York waterways, snowmobile enforcement and education, and rope rescue teams. New York State Park Police personnel are New York State police officers under paragraph e, subdivision 34, §1.20 of the state Criminal Procedure Law.

State Park Police maintain law and order at 180 state parks and 35 state historic sites, covering nearly 335,000 acres (523 sq mi; 1,360 km^{2}) of public lands and facilities, that are visited by over 78 million visitors each year.

== State Park Rangers ==
New York State Park Rangers serve as public facing ambassadors and park security. Park Rangers are subject to the provisions of the Security Guard Act of 1993, are unarmed, and have neither peace nor police officer status. Park Rangers are tasked with patrolling OPRHP land, assisting and educating patrons, administer basic first aid, check and issue park permits, enforce park rules, and other duties as assigned.

There are around 260 NYS Park Rangers across the state during the summer months. They are seasonal workers, although some larger parks keep Park Rangers employed year round.

== See also ==
- Adirondack Park Agency
- List of New York state park golf courses
- New York City Department of Parks and Recreation
