= F.N. Burt Company Factory "C" =

- U.S. National Register of Historic Places
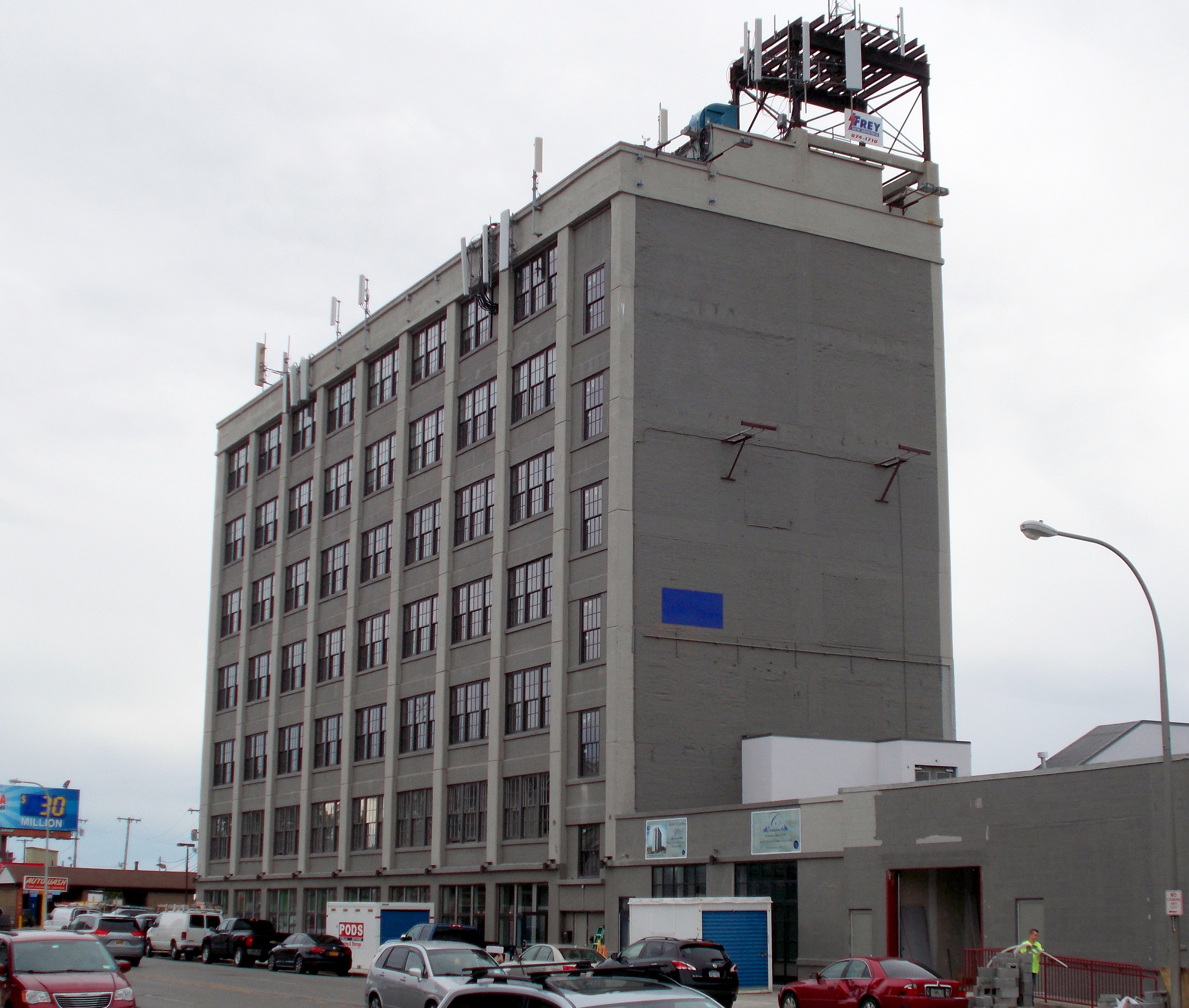
- F.N. Burt Company Factory "C", September 2016

- Location within New York Location within the United States
- Location: 1502 Niagara Street, Buffalo, New York
- Coordinates: 42°55′30″N 78°53′53″W
- Area: 0.44 acres (0.18 ha)
- Built: 1911-1932
- Built by: R.J. Reidpath & Sons/Turner Construction Co
- Architectural style: Daylight Factory
- NRHP reference No.: 100000657
- Added to NRHP: April 17, 2017

F.N. Burt Company Factory "C", also known as Bison Storage, is a historic box factory building in Buffalo, Erie County, New York. It was built in 1911. It was listed on the National Register of Historic Places in 2017.

The building has seven-stories of reinforced concrete and is a daylight factory building. It has a rectangular plan and is nine bays wide by two bays deep and has a flat roof.

The F.N. Burt Company occupied the building until 1932, after which the building housed a warehouse. Another factory operated by F.N. Burt in Buffalo was the F.N. Burt Company Factory. The building has been redeveloped as an apartment building known as The Crescendo Lofts.
