= Private Housing Finance Law =

New York housing finance statute

New York State Legislature
- Full name: Private Housing Finance Law
- Acronym: PHFL
- Introduced: 1961
- Signed into law: April 22, 1961
- Governor: Nelson A. Rockefeller
- Code: Consolidated Laws of New York
- Section: Chapter 44-b
- Website: Text of the Private Housing Finance Law

Status: Current legislation

The Private Housing Finance Law (PHFL) is a chapter of the Consolidated Laws of New York that governs a range of state and local programs providing financial assistance to privately owned housing developments in New York State. It is designated chapter 44-b of the consolidated laws and was originally enacted in 1961 by chapter 803 of the Laws of New York, effective March 1, 1962.

The statute provides the legal framework for limited-profit and limited-dividend housing companies, the Mitchell–Lama Housing Program, the New York State Housing Finance Agency, housing development fund companies (HDFCs), and various local tax-exemption and financing programs used to develop and preserve affordable housing.

== History ==
In 1955, the New York State Legislature adopted the Limited-Profit Housing Companies Law (chapter 407 of the Laws of 1955) to encourage construction of moderate-income rental and cooperative housing by private companies that accepted regulated returns in exchange for tax benefits and low-interest financing. These developments later became known collectively as the Mitchell–Lama Housing Program.

In 1961 the Legislature enacted the Private Housing Finance Law as "an act in relation to financial aids to private enterprise housing, constituting chapter forty-four-b of the consolidated laws". The new law repealed and continued the Limited-Profit Housing Companies Law as article II of the PHFL and added additional articles establishing state and local housing finance agencies and other forms of assisted private housing. The statute took effect on March 1, 1962.

Since its enactment, the PHFL has been amended many times to authorize new financing tools, clarify regulatory provisions, and expand or modify programs such as limited-profit housing companies and housing development fund companies, as well as to codify certain tax and sales-tax exemptions associated with HDFCs and other affordable housing projects.

== Structure and contents ==
The Private Housing Finance Law is divided into articles that address different classes of housing programs and entities. Key components include:

- Article I – General provisions, which contains definitions, declarations of legislative purpose, and general powers and limitations that apply across the statute.
- Article II – Limited-profit housing companies, which governs the formation, financing, and regulation of limited-profit housing companies participating in the state and city Mitchell–Lama Housing Program and similar developments, including provisions on maximum returns, rent regulation, supervision, and procedures for dissolution or "buy-out".
- Article III – New York State Housing Finance Agency Act, which constitutes the New York State Housing Finance Agency (HFA) as a corporate governmental agency and public benefit corporation with authority to issue bonds and provide mortgage loans for low- and moderate-income housing.
- Article XI – Housing development fund companies, which authorizes the creation of housing development fund companies (HDFCs) under the New York Business Corporation Law or Not-For-Profit Corporation Law to develop and operate housing for low-income or moderate-income households. Article XI also permits state and local governments to make loans to HDFCs and to grant partial or full real property tax exemptions for eligible projects.
- Article XII – New York City Housing Development Corporation Act, which establishes the New York City Housing Development Corporation (HDC) as a public benefit corporation empowered to issue revenue bonds and provide financing for multi-family housing in New York City.

Other articles address limited-dividend housing companies, local housing authorities and corporations, specific regional or local housing finance entities, and additional mechanisms for subsidizing the construction, rehabilitation, and preservation of affordable housing in New York State.

== Programs and applications ==
=== Mitchell–Lama housing ===
Article II of the Private Housing Finance Law is the primary state statutory authority for the Mitchell–Lama Housing Program, a network of state- and city-supervised rental and cooperative developments created for moderate- and middle-income households beginning in the 1950s and 1960s. The law sets conditions for participation in the program, including limits on profits and dividends, oversight by housing agencies, and procedures under which owners may repay mortgages and seek to withdraw from the program after a specified period.

=== Housing development fund companies and Article XI tax exemptions ===
Under Article XI, housing development fund companies are eligible to receive loans from a state-level Housing Development Fund and, in many cases, local real-property tax exemptions as part of efforts to develop and preserve low-income housing. In New York City, HDFCs are commonly used as limited-equity cooperative housing corporations that acquire and rehabilitate formerly city-owned buildings; their bylaws and regulatory agreements generally require owner-occupancy and long-term affordability for resident shareholders.

Article XI also underlies New York City's discretionary "Article XI" tax-exemption program, under which the City Council may approve long-term (often up to 40-year) partial or full real-property tax exemptions for affordable housing projects sponsored by HDFCs or similar entities, typically in exchange for regulatory agreements governing rents and income limits. Similar arrangements have been used in other municipalities to grant tax exemptions to HDFC-sponsored projects pursuant to section 577 of the PHFL.

=== State and city housing finance agencies ===
Articles III and XII of the Private Housing Finance Law provide enabling statutes for the New York State Housing Finance Agency and the New York City Housing Development Corporation, respectively, both of which are public benefit corporations that issue tax-exempt and taxable bonds to finance affordable multi-family housing. Bonds issued under these authorities are used to fund mortgage loans, pre-development and construction financing, and long-term permanent financing for rental developments targeted to low- and moderate-income tenants.

== Controversies and criticism ==
Analyses of New York City's real-estate tax–incentive programs have noted that exemptions and abatements authorized in part under the PHFL, including Article XI tax exemptions for non-profit housing, represent a significant public subsidy in the form of foregone property-tax revenue. A 2012 report by the Citizens Housing & Planning Council found that four major programs—J-51, 421-a, Article XI and 420-c—together accounted for more than US$1.5 billion in annual tax expenditures in 2011, including about US$49.1 million associated with Article XI, and observed that such programs have been criticized for "giving away too much" to some projects and for a lack of transparency about their full fiscal cost and public benefits. Supporters argue that these exemptions are necessary to offset high operating costs and to make deeply affordable housing financially feasible.

Implementation of Article XI for housing development fund companies has also drawn scrutiny. Reporting in the New York co-operative housing press has highlighted cases in which HDFC co-ops fell into arrears on property taxes and water and sewer charges and were placed in tax foreclosure, with advocates attributing some of the problem to poor communication and data sharing between the New York City Department of Finance and the Department of Housing Preservation and Development. Critics contend that such foreclosures can undermine the original goal of the PHFL and Article XI—to create and preserve permanently affordable, resident-controlled housing—by transferring buildings out of limited-equity ownership, while others argue that stronger oversight and technical assistance for distressed HDFCs are needed rather than changes to the statute itself.

== Reform proposals ==
In 2021 and 2022, the New York State Legislature adopted amendments to the PHFL, often described as the "Mitchell–Lama Reform" legislation. The changes, enacted as chapter 749 of the Laws of 2021 and chapter 167 of the Laws of 2022, revised provisions governing voting, elections, and referendums in Mitchell–Lama cooperatives; tightened requirements for housing companies seeking to exit the program by dissolution or reconstitution; and clarified the duties of boards of directors with respect to meetings and record-keeping. Supporters argued that these measures would curb abuses and make it harder for developments to privatize without broad resident support.

Advocacy organizations and policy analysts have also called for revisions to Article XI and related tax-exemption tools used by housing development fund companies. Proposals have included simplifying access to Article XI real-property tax exemptions, aligning exemption terms with long-term affordability requirements, and updating regulatory agreements to address resale prices, governance, and compliance for HDFC cooperatives. In 2021, the New York City Department of Housing Preservation and Development issued an updated Article XI term sheet for its Housing Preservation Opportunities program, outlining new conditions for long-term tax exemptions in exchange for affordability commitments and operational standards.

As of 2025, legislation known as the Housing Development Fund Company Self-Determination, Preservation and Affordability Act (A.2707/S.880) has been introduced in the New York State Legislature to amend the Private Housing Finance Law further. The bill would clarify rules for the dissolution and reincorporation of HDFCs, codify certain property tax exemptions and abatements, and establish additional safeguards to preserve affordability and resident control.

Supporters, including HDFC shareholder groups and housing advocates, argue that such reforms are necessary to prevent the loss of affordable units and to provide more explicit ground rules for long-term stewardship of Article XI housing.

== See also ==
- Mitchell–Lama Housing Program
- Housing Development Fund Corporation
- New York State Homes and Community Renewal
- Public benefit corporations in New York
