= New York State Housing Finance Agency =

Public-benefit corporation

Public-benefit corporation overview
- Formed: 1960
- Jurisdiction: New York (state)
- Headquarters: 641 Lexington Avenue, 4th Floor, New York City, New York 10022
- Employees: 282 (FY 2023)
- Annual budget: US$1.317 billion (expenses, FY 2023)
- Public-benefit corporation executives: William C. Thompson Jr., Chair; RuthAnne Visnauskas, President and CEO
- Parent Public-benefit corporation: New York State Homes and Community Renewal
- Website: hcr.ny.gov/housing-finance-agency

The New York State Housing Finance Agency (HFA) is a New York State public-benefit corporation created in 1960 to increase the supply of rental housing for low-income people by issuing bonds and providing low-interest mortgage loans to regulated housing companies.

The New York State Housing Trust Fund Corporation (HTFC) focuses on the broader goal of affordable housing development and tends to concentrate on rental housing, the New York State Affordable Housing Corporation (AHC) works to promote affordable homeownership, and the Homeless Housing and Assistance Corporation (HHAC) concentrates specifically on providing housing solutions for homeless populations. They focus on funding for organizations, while the separate State of New York Mortgage Agency (SONYMA) offers affordable mortgage products directly to homebuyers.

Developers can take advantage of several financing resources when they obtain HFA financing. These include the All Affordable Housing Program for developments in which 100% of the units are affordable; the Mitchell Lama Rehabilitation and Preservation (RAP) program, which helps renovate state-financed Mitchell–Lama Housing Program projects; and the 80/20 Program, which provides financing for rental projects where at least 20% of the units are set aside for low-income tenants.

== Organization ==
HFA was created by statute in 1960, which was recodified in 1961.

HFA and its subsidiaries are now administered by New York State Homes and Community Renewal, created in September 2010 to include the New York State Division of Housing and Community Renewal.

In fiscal year 2023, the New York State Housing Finance Agency reported operating expenses of $1.317 billion, outstanding debt of $18.094 billion, and a staffing level of 282 employees.

The Agency also acts as the administrative arm of the New York State Project Finance Agency, the New York State Affordable Housing Corporation and the State of New York Municipal Bond Bank Agency.

== Housing Trust Fund Corporation ==
The New York State Housing Trust Fund Corporation (HTFC) is a subsidiary of the HFA that administers the Low Income Housing Trust Fund Program; the purpose of which is to grant or loan up to $40,000 per housing unit. The advance may be used to rehabilitate vacant or under-utilized residential property, or convert vacant non-residential property to residential use for occupancy by low income homesteaders, tenants, tenant-cooperators or condominium owners. In the fiscal year ended March 31, 2024, the New York State Housing Trust Fund Corporation reported operating expenses of approximately $121.8 million and federal and state grant expenses totaling about $3.28 billion, for total expenses of roughly $3.40 billion. It was created along with AHC in 1985. The commissioner of the state Division of Housing and Community Renewal is the chairperson.

== Affordable Housing Corporation ==
HFA’s subsidiary, the New York State Affordable Housing Corporation (AHC), administers the Affordable Home Ownership Development Program (AHOD Program) to promote homeownership by low- and moderate-income households. Using resources appropriated by the State Legislature, AHC awards grants to local governments, nonprofits and charitable organizations to subsidize the cost of newly constructed homes and the cost of renovating existing housing. In 2017, the AHC had operating expenses of $2.65 million and a staff level of 199 people. The compensation for its staff exceeds its listed operating expenses by just under $4 million in the 2018 New York State Authorities Budget Office report. It was created along with HTFC in 1985. The chairperson of the HFA is the chairperson of the AHC, unlike the HTFC.

== Homeless Housing and Assistance Corporation ==
The Homeless Housing and Assistance Corporation (HHAC) is a subsidiary of the HFA that administers the Homeless Housing Assistance Program that was formerly administered by the New York State Department of Social Services. Funding received by the Corporation is used for the purpose of expanding the availability of housing for homeless persons by preserving and creating affordable housing. The monies may be used to construct new properties, rehabilitate under utilized property, or convert vacant nonresidential property to residential use for occupancy by persons of low income who are homeless. In the fiscal year ended March 31, 2025, the Homeless Housing and Assistance Corporation reported total operating expenses of about $169.3 million, up from $142.5 million in the prior year.

== See also ==
- Empire State Development Corporation
- Nyhomes
- State of New York Mortgage Agency
- State of New York Municipal Bond Bank Agency
