= New York State Division of Housing and Community Renewal =

New York state government agency

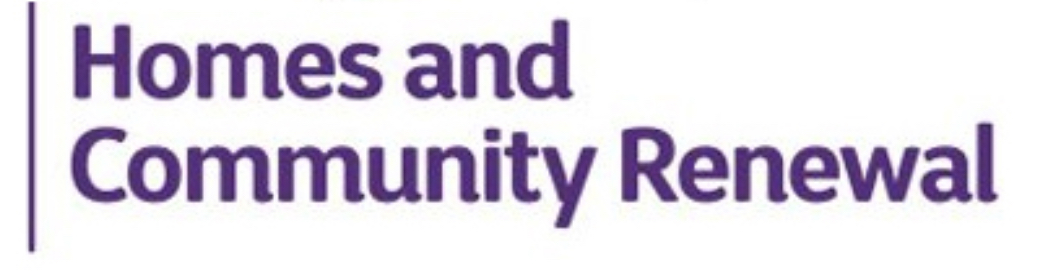

Division overview
- Division executives: RuthAnne Visnauskas, Commissioner; Betsy Mallow, Executive Deputy Commissioner
- Parent agency: Executive Department; Homes and Community Renewal (HCR)
- Key document: Public Housing Law
- Website: Official website

The New York State Division of Housing and Community Renewal (DHCR) is an agency of the New York state government responsible for administering housing and community development programs to promote affordable housing, community revitalization, and economic growth. Its primary functions include supervising rent regulations through the State Office of Rent Administration (ORA), administering affordable housing programs, providing financial assistance for housing development and rehabilitation, supporting community development initiatives, ensuring compliance with fair housing laws, and managing the Weatherization Assistance Program. DHCR has been criticized by tenant rights groups for its failure to monitor their own programs and massive delays in investigating cases of the illegal deregulation due to an extensive backlog.

== Housing regulation ==
Through its Office of Rent Administration (ORA), DHCR is responsible for administering and enforcing rent stabilization and rent control laws in New York City and other jurisdictions statewide. This includes reviewing and approving rent increases, handling tenant complaints, investigating violations, ordering corrections, and imposing penalties on landlords who are found to be noncompliant. Beyond rent regulations, DHCR is also responsible for enforcing compliance with housing maintenance codes, mediates landlord-tenant disputes, and ensures landlords adhere to warrant of habitability requirements.

== Development programs ==
DHCR administers various programs aimed at developing, rehabilitating, and preserving affordable housing in the state. Programs include the Mitchell–Lama Housing Program, federal Low-Income Housing Tax Credit and State Low-Income Housing Tax Credit, which offers tax incentives to encourage private investment in affordable housing; the federal HOME Investment Partnerships Program of the HTFC, which offers funds for housing projects targeting low-income households; and the state Low Income Housing Trust Fund of the HTFC, which provides financial support for the construction and rehabilitation of affordable rental and homeownership opportunities. HTFC receives staff and administrative support from DHCR.

DHCR also implements community development initiatives aimed at promoting economic growth and revitalizing communities. Key programs include the New York Main Street program, which provides financial assistance and technical support to help communities revitalize traditional main streets and downtown areas, and the federal Community Development Block Grant program, which offers funds to local governments, nonprofit organizations, and community-based organizations for projects that improve community infrastructure, support local businesses, and create jobs. The state Housing Development Fund provides loans to nonprofit organizations to develop low-income housing projects.

Other programs include the Rural Rental Assistance Program for projects financed with mortgages from the USDA Rural Housing Service 515 Program, and the Weatherization Assistance Program assists with reducing their heating/cooling costs.

== History ==
The State Housing Law of 1926 created the State Board of Housing. The law was reenacted in 1927 to create the Bureau of Housing. Article XVIII on housing was added to the New York Constitution effective 1 January 1939. The Division of Housing was continued in 1939 with the enactment of the Public Housing Law. "Community renewal" was added in 1961. The Temporary State Housing Rent Commission was incorporated into the DHCR as the Office of Rent Administration in 1964. The Housing Trust Fund Corporation was created in 1985 with the commissioner as its chairperson.

== Oversight and criticism ==
DHCR has had significant oversight issues and received criticism over the years, particularly regarding its role in the regulation and enforcement of rent stabilization laws. DHCR has been widely criticized for their failure to monitor rent increases/illegal deregulations, penalize landlords who violate the law regarding rent increases and for subsequently creating an extensive backlog of cases reported by tenants. Tenants and advocacy groups have frequently pointed to several failures and systemic issues that have adversely impacted New York tenants.

=== Inadequate enforcement of rental laws ===
One of the primary criticisms of DHCR is its inadequate enforcement of rent stabilization laws. Tenants have reported numerous instances where landlords have illegally increased rents or failed to maintain their properties in good condition, yet faced minimal repercussions from DHCR. This perceived leniency has led to a climate where some landlords feel emboldened to flout regulations without fear of significant consequences. In 2007, a review by the New York State Inspector General highlighted significant deficiencies in DHCR's oversight of the Mitchell–Lama Housing Program. The report found that DHCR failed to enforce tenant selection rules and financial management regulations, allowed unqualified applicants to receive apartments, and permitted housing companies to bypass regulations regarding apartment allocations and financial reporting. Additionally, DHCR employees themselves benefited from the program, raising concerns about conflicts of interest.

"State Inspector General Kristine Hamann today released the results of an in-depth review by her office concluding that the New York State Division of Housing and Community Renewal’s monitoring of the Mitchell-Lama affordable housing program and enforcement of its own regulations were deficient on a broad scale.

The IG’s report, ‘An In-Depth Review of the Division of Housing and Community Renewal’s Oversight of the Mitchell-Lama Program,’ describes the results of an examination that revealed fundamental deficiencies in DHCR’s oversight of the Mitchell-Lama program during the period January 2003 to October 2006. The IG’s office began its review in response to numerous complaints from residents and others that pointed to systemic problems in DHCR’s oversight role.

Inspector General Hamann stated: ‘Rather than safeguarding the integrity of the program, DHCR, through its own shortcomings, allowed housing companies to flout rules regarding apartment allocation, financial reporting, and contracting. DHCR’s deep and systemic failures resulted in increases in charges to tenants and the allocation of apartments to unqualified applicants at the expense of those legitimately entitled to those same apartments.’"

(Offices of the New York State Inspector General, Sept. 19 2007)

=== Delays in case processing ===
The agency has also been criticized for significant delays in processing tenant complaints and rent overcharge cases. These delays can span several months to years, leaving tenants in prolonged periods of uncertainty and financial strain. The backlog of cases often results in delayed justice, where tenants continue to overpay rent or live in substandard conditions while waiting for DHCR to act. An example involves the handling of a 2016 deregulation application by a landlord, which was dismissed in 2019 due to amendments in the High-Rent/High-Income deregulation laws under the Housing Stability and Tenant Protection Act of 2019. The landlord had applied for deregulation in a timely manner, but the DHCR's slow processing resulted in a three-year delay before dismissal, leaving the case unresolved. Additionally, tenants seeking reimbursement for rent overcharges, a right enhanced by the 2019 legislative reforms, face substantial delays as well. It can take up to three years for these cases to be resolved, with two years often elapsing before cases are assigned to one of the limited number of rent examiners at the DHCR. These delays not only prolong financial stress for tenants but also may lead them to accept less favorable settlements with landlords. The extensive delays in case processing by the DHCR compromise the effectiveness of tenant protection laws and highlight the need for improvements in the agency’s operations to ensure timely and fair resolution of housing-related cases. Critics of DHCR say that the extensive backlog of cases goes to show the direct impact of DHCR failing to monitor rent reporting by landlords, causing irreversible damage to affordable housing in New York and serious financial damage to private citizens.

==== Ethics concerns regarding case backlog & funding ====
The backlog at DHCR has raised significant ethical concerns. The agency's primary role includes enforcing rent regulations and monitoring rent reporting, but failures in these responsibilities have led to a substantial backlog of cases. This has caused prolonged financial and emotional distress for tenants seeking redress for rent overcharges and other issues. Despite receiving increased taxpayer funding aimed at resolving these backlogs, DHCR has struggled to make substantial progress. This situation suggests potential mismanagement of funds and raises questions about the agency's accountability and transparency. Critics argue that the inefficiencies in DHCR's operations and the continued delays in processing cases undermine trust in the agency's ability to protect tenants' rights effectively. The ethical concerns are compounded by instances where landlords have engaged in fraudulent activities, such as unlawfully increasing rents or deregulating units without proper oversight.

=== Lack of transparency ===
Another major point of contention is DHCR's lack of transparency. Tenants and advocates argue that the agency's processes and decisions are often opaque, making it difficult for renters to understand their rights or the status of their complaints. This lack of clarity can discourage tenants from pursuing legitimate claims and erodes trust in the agency’s ability to protect tenant rights.

=== Impact on Tenants ===
The cumulative effect of DHCR's failures has been profound for New York tenants. Many renters have experienced significant financial hardship due to unchecked rent overcharges and the costs associated with living in poorly maintained housing. Additionally, the psychological toll of prolonged legal battles and the uncertainty of unresolved complaints can be severe. These systemic issues have contributed to an environment where tenants feel vulnerable and unprotected, undermining the overall stability and affordability of housing in New York City.

=== Development programs ===
There have been instances of DHCR failing to monitor these programs (such as the Mitchell–Lama Housing Program), with ethics concerns being raised due to the financial gain of DHCR employees from taxpayer funds despite failing to enforce the regulations of the program.
