= 80/20 housing =

Housing guideline in the US for low- to moderate-income families

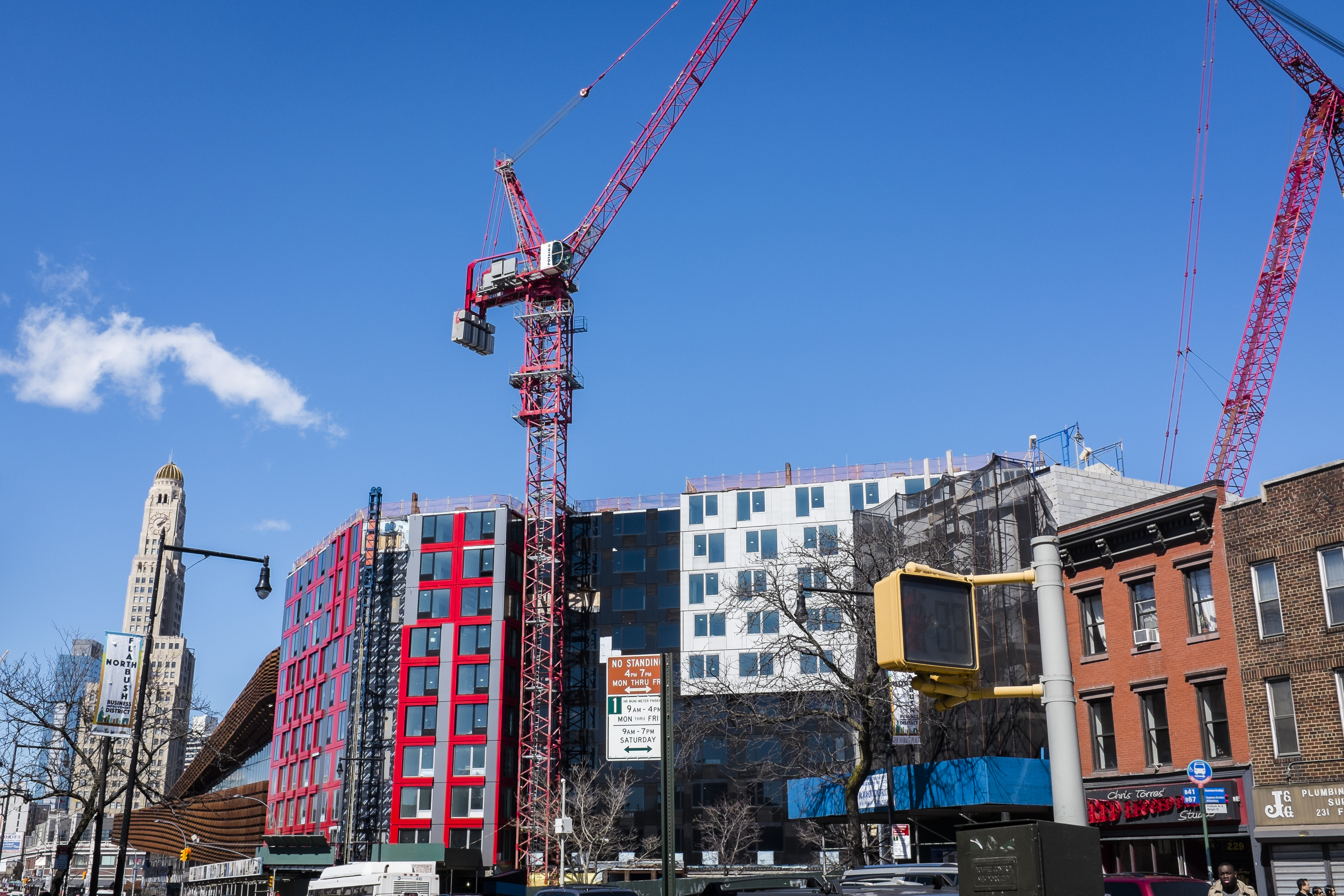
Affordable housing being constructed in Prospect Heights, New York, New York

In the United States, 80/20 housing is multifamily housing program that meets federal guidelines for tax-exempt financing. 80/20 housing developments reserve 20 percent of units as affordable housing, only to be rented by low-income residents, leaving the remaining 80 percent of units to be rented at the typical market rate. Housing projects that meet these the 80/20 rule receive tax-exempt financing from State Housing Finance Agencies (HFAs). The 80/20 program uses the Low-Income Housing Tax Credit (LIHTC) along with bond sales to finance housing projects.

This program encourages the creation diversified income projects while also allowing granting developers funds at lower interest rates. It is a national priority to provide low- and moderate-income families affordable housing, and through the 80/20 program developers can provide high quality affordable housing, while still remaining fluid to changes in the market and financing structure.

== In New York ==
The New York State Housing Finance Agency (HFA) implemented an 80/20 housing program. The HFA provides tax-free funding for developments that meet affordability qualifications. There are two options for multifamily rental developments that wish to qualify for tax-free funding through the 80/20 housing program. The first way to meet qualifications is developers must reserve 20 percent of units in the development for households making less than half of the area's median income (AMI). This leaves 80 percent of units in the development as market rate. The second way to meet qualifications is developers must reserve 25 percent of units for households making less than 60 percent of the AMI. Additionally the program is open to developments with a budget of 50 million dollars or higher.

New York City's 80/20 housing program was created in 1985 and has financed developments in New York that meet the parameters ever since. Compared to market rate units in the same area, the affordable units in 80/20 developments had a disproportionately high number of women, single parent households, households with multiple children and minorities.

Affordable housing programs such as the 80/20 program allows for essential workers who do not make a large amount of money such as policemen, sanitation workers and schoolteachers to live in high income areas where they work instead of having to commute in from other areas. Living in the places where they work allows them to be more involved in their communities. This results in a more diverse job market as well as a more diverse community.

In many cases developers will develop luxury apartment buildings in high income areas such as Manhattan for 80/20 developments as higher rents for the 80 percent market rate units offsets the cost of 20 percent affordable units. However, rising housing costs are creating an even larger gap between affordable and market rate units, especially in expensive housing markets like New York.

There has been criticism of the 80/20 program with some New York residents claiming that 80/20 housing has resulted in higher rents and gentrification. Some argue that the 20 percent of affordable units encourages developers to create expensive luxury apartment buildings which raises the overall cost of housing. Another argument is that the program prioritizing making production of housing cheaper for developers through tax breaks rather than prioritizing what is best for residents and that the 20 percent of affordable units incentivized by this system is not enough.
