= Riverside Park Community =

Residential skyscraper in Manhattan, New York

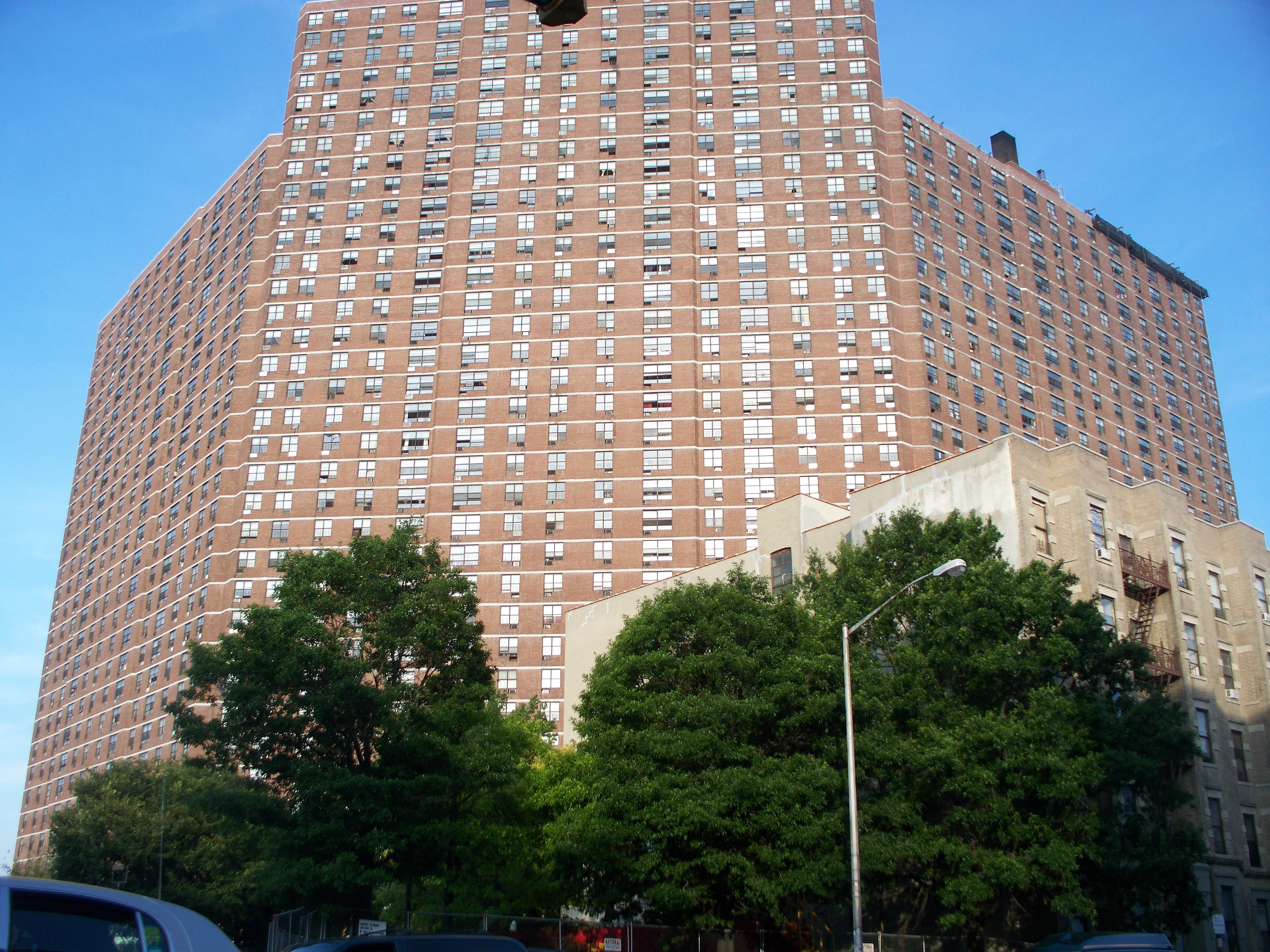
- "front" of building, Broadway side
- Interactive map of the Riverside Park Community area
- Alternative names: 3333 Broadway

General information
- Status: Completed
- Type: Apartment
- Architectural style: Modern
- Location: 3333 Broadway, New York, New York, United States
- Coordinates: 40.8202°N 73.9568°W
- Current tenants: 1,200 apartment units
- Completed: 1976

Technical details
- Structural system: Expansion Joints
- Material: Concrete slab, Brick
- Floor count: 35

Design and construction
- Architect: Max Wechsler
- Architecture firm: Max Wechsler and Associates
- Other designers: Richard Dattner and Henry LeGendre

3333 Broadway (formerly Riverside Park Community) is a group of five apartment buildings ranging from 11 to 35 stories at Broadway between West 133rd and 135th Streets, in Manhattanville, Manhattan, New York City, United States. Completed in 1976, it was the largest residential structure in the United States. Together, the five buildings include 1,193 apartment units. The present manager of the property is the Urban American Management Corporation.

== Site ==
The building was built on a lot covering approximately 285,000 square feet (26,500 m^{2}) in the Manhattanville section of Harlem. To the west of the buildings lies the West Side Highway (NY 9A) and beyond that the Hudson River. To the east of the site is Broadway. Across West 133rd Street to the south is the Manhattanville Bus Depot, and across West 135th Street to the north of the development lies a row of early-twentieth-century brick tenement buildings.

== Design ==
The architect of record was Max Wechsler of Max Wechsler & Associates. Two architectural consultants to Wechsler were Richard Dattner and Henri A. LeGendre. The New York Times credited Dattner and LeGendre as the architects who designed the housing complex. Seven days later, the Times printed a letter to the editor, from Max Wechsler, proclaiming that his firm was in fact the lead design team on the project and Dattner and LeGendre "served as consultants only." Richard Dattner claims to have served as the lead designer for Riverside Park Community, along with the 1800-student Intermediate School 195 at the base of the school and apartment complex.

=== Facade ===
The facade is a typical brick cladding system. The tenement housing surrounding the site is decorated with classically derived ornament, which the Riverside Housing lacks. There is very little ornament or applied decoration on the brick and concrete facade of the building.

The front facade (where the main entry exists) is pulled away from Broadway to create an entrance. This design was due to the Zoning Resolution of New York City, which required a certain percentage of open space for approval. The building provided a small public plaza at the corner of West 135th Street and Broadway equipped with benches, concrete tables and trees for shade. These were removed in the 2000s once the building left the Mitchell-Lama program, and the plaza was completely reconstructed in 2015 to a more contemporary design.

=== Features ===
3333 Broadway is built using concrete foundations and a concrete structure. The floors are built of concrete slab, and they are exposed through the facade. The interior communal spaces have similar modernist elements, with floor-to-ceiling windows, rounded columns and terrazzo flooring throughout. The five buildings are connected using expansion joints, so that when the buildings move, they will not cause damage to each other or fail structurally. The buildings incorporate expansion joints to alleviate damage that could be caused by the average loads placed on a building.

== History ==
This building was the remnant of an ambitious 1968 master plan by architect Richard Dattner developed by Grayco Development and sponsored by the Negro Labor Community and Columbia University. Occupying the entire area north of W. 125th St., south of W 135th St. and west of Broadway--including the riverfront along the Hudson, the plan called for 3,000,000sf of classroom and related spaces for Columbia in a large base, with two circular residential towers containing 3,000 units over this base. Along the Hudson River a series of buildings would house a Museum of Black Culture, a marina, and recreation facilities. The 1968 community riots over Columbia's plan to build a gymnasium in Morningside Park stopped this original project.

Designed by architect Richard Dattner, the original plan for 5 buildings arranged in a semi-circle at varying heights facing West 133rd Street was revised to a structure of five straight segments varying in height from 11 to 33 stories. The plan also included an intermediate public school for 1,800 children and playground facilities. Riverside Park Community was constructed under the Mitchell-Lama program, a state-run program created in 1955 that provided low-interest mortgage loans and property tax exemptions to landlords who agreed to provide low-income residents with affordable housing at below-market-rate rents. This project was sponsored and backed by the Brotherhood of Sleeping Car Porters Pension Fund/A. Philip Randolph, President, then led by Joseph Overton, head of the Negro Labor Committee.

At a cost of $54 million, the Educational Construction Fund developed this project as the first phase of a total renewal of the area between West 125th Street and 135th Street, from Broadway to Riverside Drive. (The south portion of the original site became the Manhattanville Campus of Columbia University) When the property opened in spring 1976, the director of sales received over 9,000 applications in the rental office. At the time, a family of five had to meet a basic income requirement of $13,000/year to qualify for housing. Federal subsidies, however, made it possible for people with incomes less than that which was required to obtain housing in the building. In 1976, a one-bedroom apartment cost $228/month and a two-bedroom apartment cost $272.

In 2005, after the loan was paid off, the then landlord Jerome Belson opted to exit the program as per the guidelines of the Mitchell-Lama program which legally permitted that "any owner can withdraw from the program after 20 years upon paying off the mortgage". At the same time, BSR, the management company for 3333, sold the property to Cammeby’s Realty Corp. for $85 million. In October 2022, Brookfield Properties sought to sell the complex for $400 million. After that attempt to sell the property was unsuccessful, Brookfield sought to sell the building again in June 2024 for $350 million. The building was ultimately sold in January 2025 for $324 million to a group that included to Urban American and MSquared.
