= Mitchell–Lama Housing Program =

Housing program in New York

- Country: United States
- State: New York
- Formed: 1955
- Legal basis: Limited-Profit Housing Companies Law (1955); now Private Housing Finance Law, art. II
- Administered by: New York State Homes and Community Renewal; New York City Department of Housing Preservation and Development
- Housing type: Limited-profit rental and limited-equity cooperative housing
- Units built: 269 developments; over 105,000 apartments

The Mitchell–Lama Housing Program is a non-subsidy governmental housing guarantee in the state of New York that supports limited-profit rental and cooperative housing for moderate- and middle-income residents. It was established in 1955 and is jointly administered by New York State Homes and Community Renewal (HCR) and, for city-supervised developments, the New York City Department of Housing Preservation and Development (HPD). Under the program, local jurisdictions may acquire property by eminent domain and provide it to developers to build housing for low- and middle-income tenants. Developers receive tax abatements while they remain in the program and low-interest mortgages subsidized by the federal, state, or New York City government, and are guaranteed a limited return on equity.

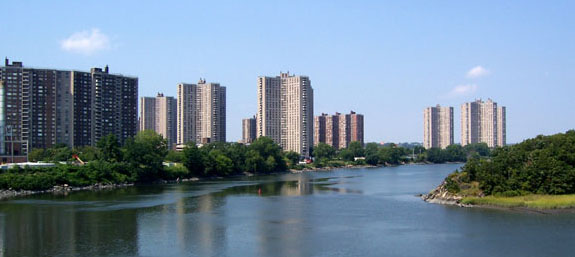
Co-op City in the Bronx, a Mitchell–Lama development

Between the mid-1950s and late 1970s, the program helped produce more than 130,000 apartments in New York City alone and a total of 269 developments with over 105,000 apartments statewide, making it one of the most significant sources of postwar, non-public affordable housing in New York. The program has been described by housing scholars and advocates as a major experiment in limited-equity and limited-profit housing and a touchstone for contemporary debates over social housing and the preservation of middle-income housing in high-cost cities.

The program was based on the Morningside Gardens housing cooperative, a co-op in Manhattan's Morningside Heights neighborhood that was subsidized with tax money.

== History ==
It was signed into law in 1955 as the Limited-Profit Housing Companies Law. It was later recodified as article II of the 1961 Private Housing Finance Law. Article II Limited-Profit Housing Companies refers to not-for-profit corporations, whereas article IV Limited Dividend Housing Companies refers to non-Mitchell–Lama affordable housing organized since 1927 as business corporations, partnerships, or trusts under State Housing Law of 1926.

The program is named for Senator MacNeil Mitchell & Assemblyman Alfred Lama.

The New York State Division of Housing and Community Renewal (DHCR) was merged with the New York State Housing Finance Administration in 2010 to create New York State Homes and Community Renewal (HCR), which finances, maintains and supervises mortgages to developments as long as they remain in the Mitchell–Lama program.

Between 1955 and 1978, roughly 135,000 units of affordable housing were produced using Mitchell–Lama funding. A 2015 analysis by the Community Service Society estimated that, in New York City, more than 66,000 subsidized rental apartments and 69,000 cooperative apartments were created under the program between 1955 and 1981. Notable apartment complexes developed with Mitchell–Lama funding include the Dayton Towers, Manhattan Plaza, Cadman Plaza, Co-op City, Masaryk Towers, and 1199 Plaza. According to New York State Homes and Community Renewal, "a total of 269 Mitchell-Lama developments with over 105,000 apartments were built under the program".

== Removing properties ==
Landlords generally may remove developments from Mitchell–Lama by prepaying the mortgage, which usually happens 20 years after the project is developed. However, in some cases, special land use agreements specify longer terms. Between 1990 and 2005, Mitchell–Lama housing lost "22,688 units, over a third (34 percent) of its stock". Subsequent analyses by the New York City Comptroller and housing researchers concluded that the pace of withdrawals from Mitchell–Lama and related limited-dividend programs accelerated in the 2000s.

When a building is privatized, it loses its tax abatement, the owner generally must refinance the mortgage, and the owner loses the right to a 6% annual return on investment. What happens to the tenants in those buildings depends on when they were built and public policy.

=== Rentals built before 1974 ===
Tenants in rental buildings built before 1974 go into rent stabilization upon leaving Mitchell–Lama. That means their rents increase according to the New York City Rent Guidelines Board orders for each new lease as well as according to orders by the New York Office of Rent Administration for, among other things, major capital improvements and landlord hardship.

=== Rentals built since 1974 ===
Tenants who do not qualify for enhanced vouchers, including all tenants in post-1973 buildings that were not federally subsidized, must pay the rent set by the landlords. (Note: According to Community Service Society housing analysts, no more than 15% of tenants in post-1973 buildings taken out of Mitchell–Lama are eligible for such vouchers.) The buildings that are no longer in a rent-regulation program pose a particular problem for tenants who were receiving special subsidies such as subsidy programs because of poverty, age, and disability.

=== Housing co-operatives ===
After a certain period of years, owners of Mitchell–Lama limited-equity housing co-operatives may decide according to their co-op voting rules to "privatize" or demutualize their building as well. That may permit owners to sell their apartments, often at a high profit, but it can potentially increase the maintenance fees of remaining residents since the building loses its tax abatement and may have increased payments for a non-subsidized mortgage. Flip taxes on resales can be used to mitigate such increases, but that is up to the co-op boards. There is some effort to require them by legislation, but that has so far been unsuccessful. Such demutualization thus simultaneously diminishes the stock of affordable housing in a given area and increases tax revenue.

== Policy ==
=== Legislation ===
Some politicians have proposed bills to the New York State legislature that would put all buildings leaving or that have left Mitchell–Lama into rent stabilization upon privatization. The Rent Act of 2011 signed into law on June 24, 2011, did not mention Mitchell–Lama rentals or co-operatives.

=== Division of Housing and Community Renewal lawsuit ===
In November 2007, the State's Division of Housing and Community Renewal (DHCR) – now NYS HCR – adopted regulations stating that just removing a pre-1974 Mitchell–Lama from the program is not a "unique or peculiar circumstance" justifying a substantial rent increase. Several landlords challenged that policy in court, asserting that it contradicts a court decision, KSLM-Columbus Apts. v. NYS DHCR, and a lower court's reference to DHCR policy letters. Justice Schlesinger of the New York State Supreme Court ruled that the regulations are legal, and one of the owners (Steve Witkoff, owner of 95 W. 95th Street, now called "Columbus 95") appealed to the state's mid-level Appellate Division. On December 28, 2010, the Appellate Division, First Department (covering the New York City boroughs of Manhattan and the Bronx) unanimously upheld DHCR's regulation. The owner of Columbus 95 failed to pursue judicial permission to appeal to New York State's highest court.

== See also ==
- Riverside Park Community
- Housing Development Fund Corporation
