= State of New York Mortgage Agency =

New York State public-benefit corporation providing mortgage financing

Agency overview
- Formed: 1970
- Type: Public-benefit corporation
- Jurisdiction: New York, U.S.
- Headquarters: New York City, New York, U.S.
- Parent department: New York State Homes and Community Renewal
- Website: hcr.ny.gov/sonyma

The State of New York Mortgage Agency (SONYMA or Sonny Mae) is a public-benefit corporation created in 1970 by the state government of New York to increase the availability of residential mortgage funds and support affordable homeownership. It offers below-market fixed-rate mortgages and related programs for eligible low- and moderate-income homebuyers, principally first-time buyers, and funds its activities mainly by issuing tax-exempt revenue bonds backed by mortgage repayments. For financial reporting purposes, SONYMA is a component unit of the State of New York and is part of New York State Homes and Community Renewal (HCR).

SONYMA also operates a Mortgage Insurance Fund (MIF) that provides mortgage insurance for single-family and multifamily loans made by commercial and public lenders, including loans financing the construction of affordable rental housing.

== History ==
The New York State Legislature created the State of New York Mortgage Agency in 1970 through the State of New York Mortgage Agency Act (L. 1970, ch. 612), authorizing it to issue bonds and notes to purchase residential mortgage loans and provide mortgage insurance. Legislation enacted in 1972 (L. 1972, ch. 234) further permitted the agency to issue bonds to finance student loans guaranteed by the Higher Education Services Corporation.

Legal scholar Robert S. Amdursky described the agency’s creation as a response to tight credit conditions and a shortage of conventional mortgage lending, with the aim of stabilizing the supply of residential mortgage funding in the state. The agency is administratively situated within the state’s housing agency, now known as New York State Homes and Community Renewal.

== Programs ==
=== Single-family mortgage programs ===
SONYMA provides long-term, fixed-rate mortgages for the purchase of owner-occupied one- to four-family homes, condominiums and cooperatives that meet its eligibility criteria. Its two primary mortgage products are the Achieving the Dream program, targeted to low-income borrowers, and the Low Interest Rate Program for low- and moderate-income borrowers. Both programs offer 30-year fixed-rate loans that can be combined with other SONYMA and third-party grants and subsidies, subject to income, purchase price, credit and occupancy limits.

From fiscal year 2015 through fiscal year 2024, SONYMA assisted 16,694 households with approximately US$3.5 billion in mortgage loans, with an average of about 1,669 mortgages originated per year. Since 2019, most loans have gone to low-income households, and by 2021 more than three-quarters of SONYMA borrowers were classified as low income under the agency’s income limits. In 2023, SONYMA loans accounted for roughly 1 percent of all residential mortgages originated in New York State.

SONYMA also administers specialized homeownership initiatives, including programs for veterans, recent graduates, manufactured home buyers and energy-efficient homes, which are offered as program variants or add-ons to its core mortgage products.

=== Down payment assistance ===
To address down payment and closing-cost barriers, SONYMA offers a Down Payment Assistance Loan (DPAL) that can be paired with its first-mortgage programs. DPALs are subordinate loans that typically provide at least US$3,000 or 3 percent of the home purchase price, up to a capped amount, and are forgivable after a specified period if the borrower continues to occupy the home and does not sell or refinance. In 2020 SONYMA introduced enhanced DPAL Plus options offering larger assistance amounts—up to US$30,000 in certain cases—for eligible borrowers and neighborhoods.

A majority of SONYMA borrowers use down payment assistance: more than 70 percent of loans included a DPAL in fiscal year 2024, and the average amount of assistance per household increased from about US$6,200 in fiscal year 2015 to nearly US$16,000 in fiscal year 2024.

=== Other initiatives ===
SONYMA has sponsored targeted initiatives such as neighborhood revitalization and community restoration programs, which purchase or refinance distressed mortgages and support the rehabilitation of vacant or foreclosed properties in partnership with local governments, nonprofit organizations and participating lenders.

== Mortgage Insurance Fund ==
SONYMA’s Mortgage Insurance Fund (MIF) provides mortgage insurance for loans made by commercial banks and public lenders to finance affordable multifamily rental housing as well as certain single-family mortgages purchased by SONYMA. The fund is intended to encourage private capital investment in housing that serves low- and moderate-income households by reducing lenders’ credit risk.

MIF insurance may be provided on individual loans or on pools of loans and is available for a variety of property types, including multifamily developments, senior housing and certain single-family transactions. In addition to traditional project insurance, the fund has offered specialized products such as the "Day 1" program, which provides mortgage insurance on construction loans for the moderate rehabilitation of multifamily properties. The fund is supported in part by a statewide mortgage recording surtax, as provided in state law.

== Governance and finances ==
The agency is governed by a nine-member board of directors consisting of the New York State Comptroller, the Director of the Budget, the Commissioner of Housing and Community Renewal, one director appointed by the temporary president of the state senate, one appointed by the speaker of the assembly, and four appointed by the governor with the advice and consent of the senate.

SONYMA finances its mortgage programs primarily by issuing tax-exempt homeowner mortgage revenue bonds and using the proceeds to purchase eligible mortgage loans from a network of participating lenders. Debt service on the bonds is paid from mortgage repayments and investment earnings, and the agency’s bonds are not general obligations of the State of New York.

According to SONYMA’s audited financial statements for the fiscal year ended October 31, 2024, the agency reported total assets of approximately US$6.8 billion and total net position of about US$3.5 billion, with bonds payable and other debt-related obligations comprising the vast majority of its liabilities. The agency’s financial statements are prepared in accordance with U.S. generally accepted accounting principles and audited by an independent public accounting firm.

== See also ==
- Empire State Development Corporation
- Federal Housing Administration
- Nyhomes
- New York State Housing Finance Agency
- State of New York Municipal Bond Bank Agency
