= New York State Homes and Community Renewal =

New York State government agency

Agency overview
- Formed: September 22, 2010
- Jurisdiction: New York (state)
- Headquarters: Albany, New York and New York City
- Agency executive: RuthAnne Visnauskas, Commissioner and CEO
- Website: hcr.ny.gov

New York State Homes and Community Renewal (HCR) is the State of New York's umbrella affordable housing agency and housing finance entity. It serves as the state's affordable housing lender, with a mission to "build, preserve and protect affordable housing and increase homeownership throughout New York State". HCR consolidates and coordinates the activities of several housing agencies and public-benefit corporations, including the New York State Division of Housing and Community Renewal (DHCR), the New York State Housing Finance Agency (HFA), the State of New York Mortgage Agency (SONYMA), the New York State Housing Trust Fund Corporation (HTFC) and the New York State Affordable Housing Corporation (AHC).

Through these components, HCR finances single-family residential mortgages and multifamily rental housing, provides mortgage insurance, administers rent regulation and rental assistance programs, and awards grants to local governments and non-profit organizations for the construction and rehabilitation of affordable housing.

HFA and SONYMA are self-funded public-benefit corporations that finance their activities primarily through tax-exempt bonds and program income instead of direct appropriations from the state general fund, while AHC and certain housing programs administered by HTFC receive appropriations through the state budget.

It was created from the merger of DHCR and the "nyhomes" group of housing finance authorities on September 22, 2010.

== History ==
Before 2010, New York State's housing and housing finance functions were carried out by multiple entities, including DHCR, HFA, SONYMA, HTFC and AHC, as well as the State of New York Municipal Bond Bank Agency and the Tobacco Settlement Financing Corporation. In 2009 Governor David Paterson proposed administratively consolidating these entities to streamline state government, improve coordination of housing programs and reduce costs. The proposal was discussed in state budget documents and covered in industry reporting on New York's housing finance authorities.

New York State Homes and Community Renewal was formally created on September 22, 2010, when the New York State Division of Housing and Community Renewal and the "nyhomes" group of public authorities merged under a single leadership and administrative structure branded as HCR.

Subsequent planning documents for federal housing and community development funds characterize HCR as the state's umbrella housing organization and designate it as the lead entity for preparing New York's consolidated plans and annual action plans.

== Organization and programs ==
HCR is headed by a Commissioner and Chief Executive Officer; as of 2025, the Commissioner and CEO is RuthAnne Visnauskas. HCR describes its mission as building and preserving affordable housing, increasing homeownership, and strengthening neighborhoods and communities statewide by integrating housing finance, rent regulation and community development programs.

HCR encompasses several agencies and public-benefit corporations, including:

- the Division of Housing and Community Renewal (DHCR), which administers state and federal affordable housing and community development programs, oversees the Mitchell–Lama Housing Program and rent-regulated housing through its Office of Rent Administration, and manages various rental assistance and weatherization programs;
- the Housing Finance Agency (HFA), which finances multifamily rental housing by issuing tax-exempt and taxable bonds and providing below-market mortgage loans for regulated affordable housing;
- the State of New York Mortgage Agency (SONYMA), which provides mortgage products and mortgage insurance for first-time and other income-qualified homebuyers;
- the Housing Trust Fund Corporation (HTFC), which administers state and federal housing trust fund, HOME and community development block grant funds for affordable housing and community development; and
- the Affordable Housing Corporation (AHC), which provides grants to governmental and non-profit organizations to subsidize the cost of constructing and rehabilitating homes for low- and moderate-income owner-occupants.

Within HCR, program offices such as the Office of Community Renewal and the Office of Rent Administration administer community development funding and rent regulation, respectively.

HCR and its component entities oversee a range of programs, including:

- multifamily housing finance programs operated by HFA to create and preserve income-restricted rental housing;
- SONYMA mortgage and down-payment assistance programs;
- state and federal housing trust fund and HOME programs administered by HTFC;
- downtown and neighborhood revitalization initiatives, such as the New York Main Street Program; and
- administration of rent stabilization and rent control laws, and various rental assistance and preservation programs, through DHCR.

The agency and its components are subject to regular oversight and audits by the Office of the New York State Comptroller and other bodies. Recent audits have examined HCR's administration of the Mitchell–Lama Housing Program and HTFC's oversight of the Rural Rental Assistance Program and other federally funded housing programs.

== See also ==
- State of New York Mortgage Agency
- New York State Housing Finance Agency
- New York State Division of Housing and Community Renewal
- Mitchell–Lama Housing Program
