= Local 22 (R.J. Reynolds Tobacco Workers' Union) =

American tobacco workers' union

Local 22 (R.J. Reynolds Tobacco Workers’ Union)
- Local 22, Food, Tobacco, Agricultural and Allied Workers of America (FTA-CIO)
- Founded: 1943
- Dissolved: 1950
- Headquarters: Winston-Salem, North Carolina
- Location: United States
- Members: Approximately 10,000
- Key people: Velma Hopkins, Theodosia Simpson, Moranda Smith, Robert “Chick” Black
- Parent organization: Food, Tobacco, Agricultural and Allied Workers of America (FTA-CIO)
- Affiliations: Congress of Industrial Organizations (CIO)

Local 22 (R.J. Reynolds Tobacco Workers’ Union) was an interracial labor union that represented employees of the R. J. Reynolds Tobacco Company in Winston-Salem, North Carolina, between 1943 and 1950. Organized under the Food, Tobacco, Agricultural and Allied Workers of America (FTA-CIO), the local grew to include roughly 10,000 members, predominantly African American women, and became one of the most influential examples of “civil rights unionism” in the mid-twentieth-century South.

Led by figures such as Velma Hopkins, Theodosia Simpson, Moranda Smith, and Robert “Chick” Black, Local 22 fought for higher wages, improved working conditions, and racial equality inside the factory and in their communities. The union helped register thousands of Black voters and supported the 1947 election of Winston-Salem’s first Black alderman since Reconstruction.

Before unionization, conditions at R.J. Reynolds combined low wages and strict racial segregation. Organizer Robert “Chick” Black recalled earning ten cents an hour under foremen “worse than Gestapos.”

On 17 June 1943, Theodosia Simpson led a work stoppage of about 200 women. James McCardell, a worker in the adjoining casing room, supported the protest, saying, “If these women’ll stand up for their rights, I’m with them.” Moments later, he collapsed and died of a cerebral hemorrhage after repeated attempts to obtain medical attention from the company nurse. Within three days, thousands stopped work and formed a grievance committee to negotiate demands with Reynolds executives.

Local 22 won formal recognition in December 1943 and its first contract by April 1944, securing higher pay, seniority rights, a medical leave process, and a grievance procedure. Women such as Hopkins, Simpson, and Moranda Smith organized meetings, taught contract rights, and linked workplace reform to broader citizenship education.

When city authorities barred union meetings from public buildings, local ministers opened their churches, assuming the costs of heat and lighting. Local 22 established a weekly newspaper, a radio program, and collaborated with the NAACP on voter registration drives.

The post-war years brought intense anti-Communist pressure. Investigations by the House Un-American Activities Committee and local media portrayed Local 22 as subversive. Hopkins faced questioning by her church’s deacons after radio accusations of Communist sympathies, though her congregation reaffirmed her leadership. The broader Congress of Industrial Organizations expelled the FTA in 1949, and the local was decertified in 1950.

Korstad interprets Local 22 as a crucial link between New Deal labor radicalism and the later civil-rights movement, arguing that its vision of “economic democracy” anticipated the freedom campaigns of the 1950s and 1960s. Hopkins summarized the union’s purpose: “It wasn’t just wages we wanted, but freedom.”

== Bibliography ==
- Black, Robert “Chick.” Interviews E-0094, E-0103, E-0104. Southern Oral History Program Collection. Chapel Hill: University of North Carolina at Chapel Hill, 1974–1988.
- Hopkins, Velma. Interview E-0126. Southern Oral History Program Collection. Chapel Hill: University of North Carolina at Chapel Hill, 1987.
- Korstad, Robert R. Civil Rights Unionism: Tobacco Workers and the Struggle for Democracy in the Mid-Twentieth-Century South. Chapel Hill: University of North Carolina Press, 2003.
- “Review of Civil Rights Unionism.” Libcom.org. Accessed October 29, 2025. https://libcom.org/article/review-civil-rights-unionism-tobacco-workers-and-struggle-democracy-mid-twentieth-century.
