= United Office and Professional Workers of America =

20th-century trade union

The United Office and Professional Workers of America (UOPWA) (1937–1950) was a CIO-affiliated union and one of the white-collar unions formed by the CPUSA-breakaway party of Lovestoneites.

== History ==
=== Formation ===
The UOPWA of private sector clerical workers formed in 1937 when 23 white collar unions merged, including the Office Workers Union, and the Bookkeepers, Stenographers, and Accountants Union (BS & AU). They also left the American Federation of Labor (AFL) for the Congress of Industrial Organizations (CIO).

=== Activities ===
"The UOPWA held an unusual position in the newly formed CIO. In a federation committed to industrial unionism, here was a union with elements of both craft and industrial structure."

"The union included a substantial group of leftwing activists and sympathizers." In the 1930s-1940s, Communist-swayed unions in the CIO included UOPWA, International Fur and Leather Workers Union (IFLWU); the International Longshoremen's and Warehousemen's Union (ILWU); the United Electrical, Radio and Machine Workers of America (UE); the International Union of Mine, Mill, and Smelter Workers (IUMUSW); the United Packinghouse Workers of America (UPWA); the Food, Tobacco, Agricultural, and Allied Workers (FTA); the Farm Equipment Workers (FE); the United Public Workers (UPW); the American Communications Association (ACA); the International Fishermen and Allied Workers of America (IFAWA); and the National Union of Marine Cooks and Stewards (NUMCS). As early as 1938, UOPWA leadership came under Communist domination, when they suspended Anne Gould, editor of the Progressive Office Worker, who took 500 members of UOPWA Local 16 out and joined the AFL's Bookkeepers, Stenographers and Accountants Union. UOPWA's office workers were principally employees of the ILGWU, the Workmen's Circle, the League for Industrial Democracy, Union Health Center, Labor Committee for Palestine, the Non-Sectarian Anti-Nazi League, and the Workmen's Sick and Death Benefit Fund.

In 1941, Maxwell Copelof, a New York State government official and private arbitrator, represented Amalgamated Bank in Amalgamated Bank of New York vs. United Office and Professional Workers of America, Local 16 (UOPWA) on the issue of job assignment.

On November 3, 1946, UOPWA won a strike for higher wages against Merchants Bank of New York.

In 1947-1949, UOPWA leadership refused to sign non-Communist affidavits as required by the 1947 Taft-Hartley Act. On November 25, 1948, Local 16 denounced CIO president Philip Murray for proposing dissolution of UOPWA's national leadership due to "Communist proclivities" of Union 16.

=== Dissolution ===
In 1949-1950, the CIO expelled the UOPWA due to Communist domination.

== Aftermath ==
Shortly after expulsion from the CIO, UOPWA merged with the Food, Tobacco and Agricultural Workers Union and the Distributive Workers Union (formed by locals that had just left the Retail, Wholesale and Department Store Union) to create the Distributive, Processing, and Office Workers of America (DPOWA). Internal disputes and political pressures brought about DPOWA's demise by 1954, when it merged with the Retail, Wholesale and Department Store Union.

In April 1950, insurance workers followed Allan Haywood under a new Insurance and Allied Workers Organizing Committee; Richard T. Leonard succeeded Haywood. In 1953, these insurance workers held a convention in Cleveland to form a new union, the Insurance Workers of America. The Insurance Agents' successor eventually merged with the United Food and Commercial Workers.

Some Consumers Union members protested the change to the Distributive, Processing, and Office Workers of America and narrowly (66 to 57 votes) won new membership under the Newspaper Guild of New York.

In 1969, ten of the largest local unions (representing 40,000 members) belonging to the Retail, Wholesale and Department Store Union disaffiliated from that international union, formed a new union (the National Council of Distributive Workers of America), and joined the Alliance for Labor Action. The Distributive Workers joined the United Auto Workers in 1979.

== Membership ==
UOPWA's membership was largely female and included people with small manufacturers, insurance, banks (e.g., Bankers Trust), finance, and direct mail. It also included professional workers such as engineers as well as more than 300 members of the Consumers Union. Membership peaked in 1948 with 75,000 members in 100 locals in cities nationwide, though centered in New York City. Insurance workers alone included 40,000 people, of whom 90% were insurance agents.

Members included Vicki Garvin (1915-2007), a champion of African American and women's rights who served as UOPWA's research director and was also a member of the National Negro Congress (1945) and of the Communist Party USA (1947).

== Confusion with UPWA ==
UOPWA was not the same as the United Public Workers of America (UPWA) (1946–1952), a fellow CIO member, also expelled from the CIO in 1950.

== Presidents ==
1937: Lewis Merrill
1947: James H. Durkin

== Publications ==
- "Summary of the proceedings of the convention of the United Office and Professional Workers of America" (1938)
- You Can Get It: How White Collar Workers Can Win Higher Pay by Lewis Merrill (1946)
- House We Built: UOPWA, How It Is Set Up, How It Is Run (1947)
- Career (1948)
- "The Facts of Life: An Economic Report" (1948) by Vicki Garvin

== See also ==
- Vicki Garvin
- United Furniture Workers of America
- United Public Workers of America
