= Michael Goodwin =

Michael Goodwin may refer to:

- Michael Goodwin (architect), architect and politician in the Phoenix, Arizona area
- Michael Goodwin (actor), American actor known for his roles in television and films
- Michael Goodwin (unionist) (born 1942), American labor union leader

== See also ==
- Mike Godwin (born 1956), American attorney
- Mickey Goodwin (1958–2009), American light heavyweight boxer
