= Reid Robinson =

American unionist

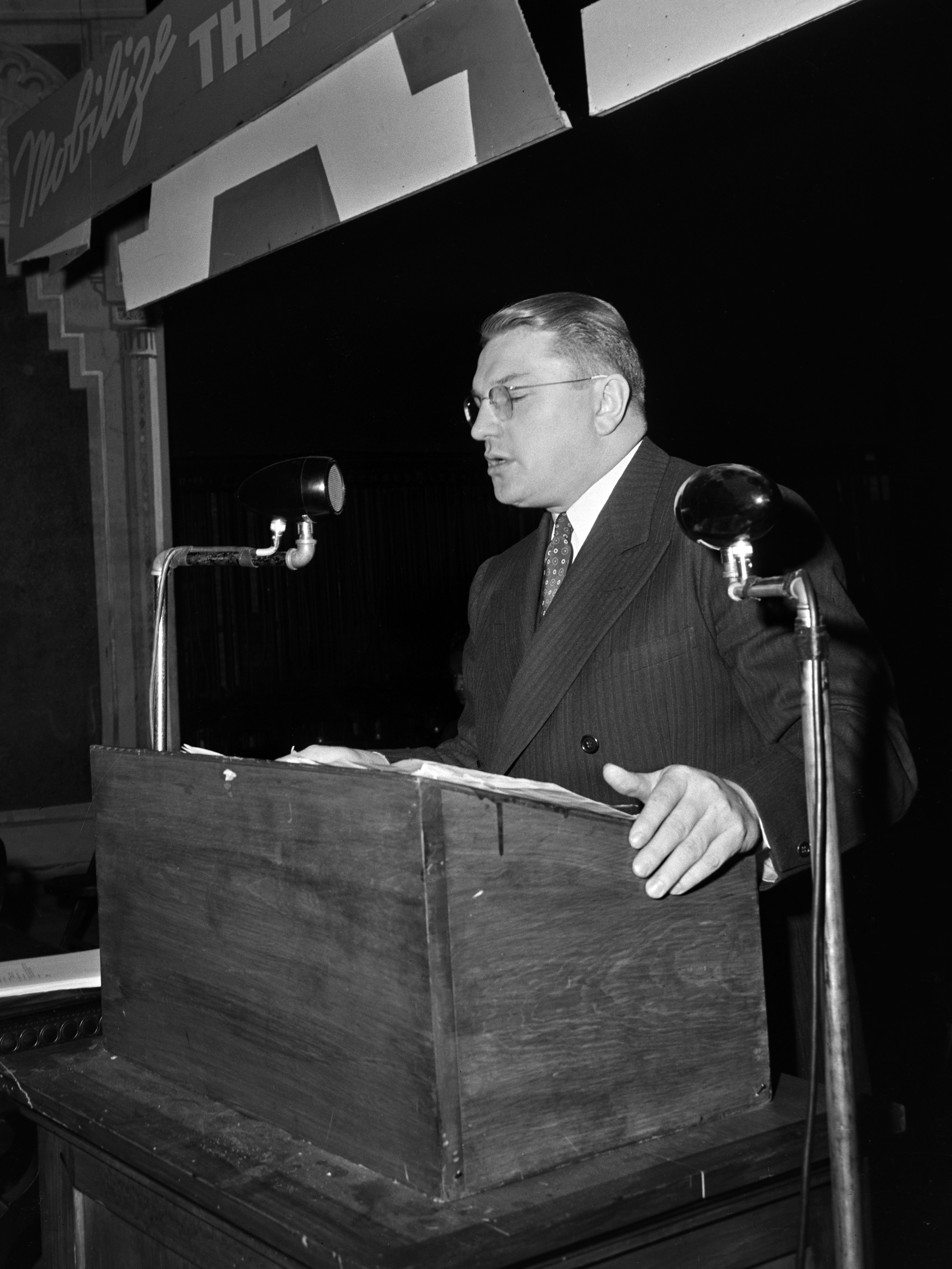
Robinson speaks at the national American Peace Mobilization convention at the Mecca Temple in New York City, April 6, 1941

Reid Robinson (born June 7, 1908) was an American labor unionist.

== Biography ==
Robinson was born in Butte, Montana, and his family moved to Calgary in 1914, then to Seattle in 1918, before returning to Butte in 1921. After school, he worked in the copper mines, joining the International Union of Mine, Mill and Smelter Workers, where his father had become the secretary-treasurer.

Robinson devoted much of his time to the union, building the Butte Miner's No. 1 local into the most significant in the organization. He served as its financial secretary before being elected president of the international union in 1935. He also became a vice-president of the Congress of Industrial Organizations.

In 1945, Robinson attended and spoke at the World Trade Union Conference in London. Under his leadership, the union's membership grew from 20,000 to more than 90,000. He recruited many organizers, including communists, which caused friction with the union's right-wing supporters. Despite being re-elected in 1946, he resigned in 1947 due to losing support from the union's executive.

Robinson was elected as the union's eastern vice-president in 1947, focusing on organizing Canadian miners and supporting Henry A. Wallace's campaign in the 1948 United States presidential election. Though he was not a communist, he was deported from Canada as a communist agitator and resigned from his union positions in 1950. He moved back to Butte, then to California, where he worked in various manual jobs.

Trade union offices
Preceded by Thomas H. Brown	President of the International Union of Mine, Mill and Smelter Workers; 1935–1947	Succeeded by Maurice Travis
