= Federation of Architects, Engineers, Chemists, and Technicians =

Former trade union of the United States

The Federation of Architects, Engineers, Chemists, and Technicians (FAECT) was a labor union in the United States, which existed between 1933 and 1946. In 1946, it merged into the United Office and Professional Workers of America union.

== History ==
In 1929 the Union of Technical Men - local 37 of the International Federation of Technical Engineers, Architects and Draftsmen's Union (IFTEADU), based in New York - was expelled from the international union due to 'excessive radicalism' following an unsuccessful strike at the Board of Transportation. In 1933 - at the height of the Great Depression - the American Institute of Architects published suggested minimum wage standards under the National Industrial Recovery Act (NIRA) that prescribed a rate of 50 cents per hour for architectural draftsmen and 40 cents for engineering draftsmen. Incensed by what they perceived as an insultingly low wage rate, members of the Union of Technical Men called a meeting at which it was resolved to merge with United Committee of Architects, Engineers and Chemists (a loose coalition of technical employees' organizations, primarily representing civil service engineers) to form the FAECT. The federation grew rapidly, reaching a membership of 6,500 by 1934, organised into 15 local unions. In June 1936 the FAECT organised a sit-down strike by architects employed by the New York City Department of Parks, who barricaded themselves in their offices in protest at alleged anti-union activities by Robert Moses and other Department officials. Later in the same year the federation secured a significant pay rise for the approximately 7000 architects employed by the Works Progress Administration (WPA).

The FAECT initially sought to affiliate to the American Federation of Labor (AFL) by rejoining the IFTEADU as an independent local, despite the fact that it was now significantly larger than the IFTEADU (which boasted approximately 1500 members, primarily draftsmen employed in naval shipyards). In 1936 the IFTEADU national convention voted to allow the FAECT to rejoin, however this was blocked by IFTEADU's president C. L. Rosenmund. In 1937 a new national labor organization was created - the Congress of Industrial Organizations (CIO) and the FAECT affiliated to it almost immediately. Following affiliation there was a re-organization of industrial jurisdiction, with many of the FAECT's members in civil service transferred to the American Federation of State, County and Municipal Employees (AFSCME) CIO. During the late 1930s the federation attempted to expand its membership in the private sector and launched successful organizing drives at a number of major American industrial corporations including Shell (at its Emeryville Research Center), General Electric, RCA and ITT. It also organized affiliate chapters in a number of technical colleges, aiming to introduce students to unionism in the hope they would be more likely to become members after graduating.

Between 1934 and 1938 the FAECT published a journal first titled The Bulletin, then Technical America. From 1936 it also operated the Federation Technical School in New York, teaching architecture, industrial design and related subjects.

A number of the union's officials were communists and it was accused of involvement with Soviet espionage, particularly in relation to the United States' atomic weapons program. J. Robert Oppenheimer was a member of the union during his time at Berkeley, along with his protégé and radiologist Giovanni Rossi Lomanitz; who helped organise it in the university.

In 1946, the union merged into the United Office and Professional Workers of America as Local 231.
