= Office and Professional Employees International Union =

North American trade union

- Abbreviation: OPEIU
- Predecessor: International Council of Office Employee Unions
- Formation: 1945; 81 years ago
- Type: Trade union
- Headquarters: New York City, New York, US
- Locations: United States; Canada
- Members: 88,000 (2021)
- President: Tyler Turner
- Secretary-treasurer: Mary Mahoney
- Secessions: Canadian Office and Professional Employees Union
- Affiliations: AFL–CIO; Canadian Labour Congress
- Website: opeiu.org
- Formerly called: Office Employees International Union

The Office and Professional Employees International Union (OPEIU) is a trade union in the United States and Canada representing approximately 88,000 white-collar working people in the public and private sectors. It has members in all 50 US states, the District of Columbia, and Puerto Rico, as well as in one local in Canada.

== History ==
Clerical unions began forming in the early 1900s. By 1920, the American Federation of Labor (AFL) had issued charters to more than 50 clerical unions. In 1942, the locals banded together to form the International Council of Office Employee Unions. In 1945, this union received a charter from the AFL as the Office Employees International Union.

In 1992, the union absorbed the Leather Workers' International Union of America. In 2001, it merged with the International Technical and Professional Employees Union (ITPE), which had disaffiliated from the Marine Engineers Beneficial Association. As of 2026, the ITPE (now known as the ITPEU, or as OPEIU Local 4873) claims to represent 100,000 workers in the United States and another 40,000 in Canada. In 2010, the Association of Minor League Umpires, the national labor union that represents Minor League Baseball umpires voted to join OPEIU.

== Canadian autonomy ==
Canadian members made up nearly a quarter of the union as early as the 1970s but in 2003 the OPEIU chose not to appoint a Canadian to the position of Secretary-Treasurer, the second-highest union rank. In March 2004, OPEIU President Michael Goodwin concluded that the American locals of the union had subsidized the Canadian locals by approximately $10 million. Goodwin proposed raising the per capita dues of Canadian OPEIU members by $2.00 per member per month, which, accounting for the then low Canadian dollar, would mean Canadians were paying more in dues than their American counterparts.

On June 20, 2004, the Canadian locals voted 74 percent to 26 percent to form their own, autonomous union under the umbrella of the international. OPEIU Canadian delegates to the international convention, meeting in Bal Harbor, Florida, withdrew from the proceedings and formed their own national union—the Canadian Office and Professional Employees Union (COPE).

== Presidents ==
1945: Paul Hutchings
1953: Howard Coughlin
1979: John Kelly
1994: Michael Goodwin
2015: Richard Lanigan
2025: Tyler Turner
