= Velma Hopkins =

American labor organizer (1909–1996)

- Born: February 24, 1909
- Died: March 19, 1996 (aged 87)

Velma Hopkins (February 24, 1909 – March 19, 1996) was an American labor rights activist. In 1943 she helped organize a strike against R. J. Reynolds Tobacco Company, which attracted over 10,000 participants from Winston-Salem, North Carolina and led to the founding of the only union to be formed by Reynolds Tobacco employees. Hopkins was a leader in Local 22, a racially integrated union led primarily by Black women. Her efforts in fighting for higher pay and fair treatment made her a leader in the African American community of Winston-Salem.

== Early life and education ==
Velma Hopkins was born February 24, 1909, the eldest of four children. Her mother was widowed before Velma was ten years old and the family moved to Winston-Salem.

== Activism at Reynolds Tobacco ==
Hopkins started her career as a tobacco stemmer at the R. J. Reynolds Tobacco Company. African Americans were rarely hired into higher paying jobs at the company, and women were paid less than men. Conditions at the company were harsh for those in lower paying jobs: Black employees worked in segregated areas with oppressive heat and dangerous tobacco dust.

After the 1943 death of a coworker, Hopkins and others organized a walkout. City workers in other professions joined in the strike, and eventually more than 10,000 people walked picket lines outside of the company's headquarters. The workers formed a union, Local 22 of the Food, Tobacco, Agricultural and Allied Workers of America-CIO. Local 22 was racially integrated and led primarily by Black women. It was the only union in the history of Reynolds Tobacco.

In 1944 Hopkins threw a switch cutting off power to all the machines at her plant, beginning a strike protesting low pay, long hours, and poor working conditions. Another major strike occurred in 1947. During the 1940s, Hopkins was one of the Local 22 leadership negotiating for pay raises, pay equity, and improved working conditions for Reynolds employees. The union's efforts gained national attention: Woody Guthrie and Paul Robeson both visited Winston-Salem to support Local 22.

Describing how complaints increased after the union was formed, Hopkins explained that people had been too afraid to complain before the formation of the union, "I've got to work. I'm head of a household. I'm feeding children. Even though you ain't making but $9.35, that $9.35 meant survival. And once we got the union, they felt like, well, I've got some protection. I've got somebody that really cares."

Hopkins was disparaged and received death threats for her actions. Local press and the Reynolds leadership engaged in red-baiting and anti-union efforts, and Local 22 lost a decertification election in 1950.

== Later activism and legacy ==
Hopkins's labor work made her a leader in the local Black community, and she continued her efforts fighting for civil liberties for African Americans. Her activism included helping Black people prepare for and pass voting tests and pushing for desegregation in schools. Hopkin's efforts in fighting for fair wages for thousands of Reynolds employees helped establish Winston-Salem's African American middle class community, leading the way to further strides forward in the emerging civil rights movement.

North Carolina State Senator Earline Parmon was mentored by Hopkins and described Hopkins as "instrumental in shaping her and a generation of local black leaders".
