= Moranda Smith =

American union organizer (1916–1950)

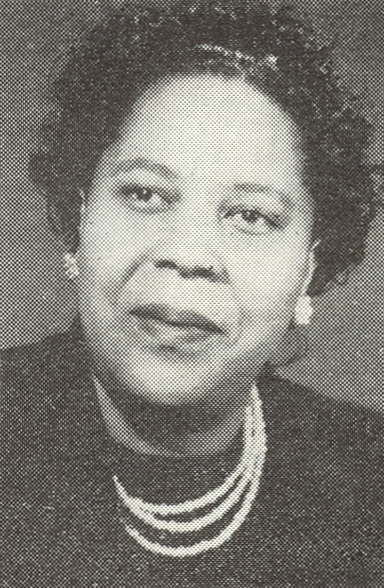
Smith c. 1952

Moranda Smith was a black labor organizer and unionist who served as the first regional director of Winston-Salem, North Carolina's Local 22 of the Food, Tobacco, Agricultural and Allied Workers of America (FTA-CIO) in the 1930 and 1940s.

== Career ==
Born of a sharecropping family in South Carolina, Smith led thousands of Winston-Salem workers to win $1,250,000 in back pay in the leaf houses and stemmeries. In 1943, after a Black worker fell dead at a Reynolds Tobacco Company plant, Smith, along with thousands of other Black women, participated in a spontaneous sit-down leading to a massive walkout forcing Reynolds to temporarily shut down.

Her leadership at the local 22 saw a 50% rise of minimum wages. The union also increased voter registration in the area, leading to the election of the first Black alderman in the South. Throughout her career as a unionist, Smith worked extensively, "openly defying" the Ku Klux Klan.

== Personal life ==
Smith died in 1950 at the age of 34, "the strain of her activities seeming to be a major cause."
