= Dorothy Ray Healey =

American communist (1914–2006)

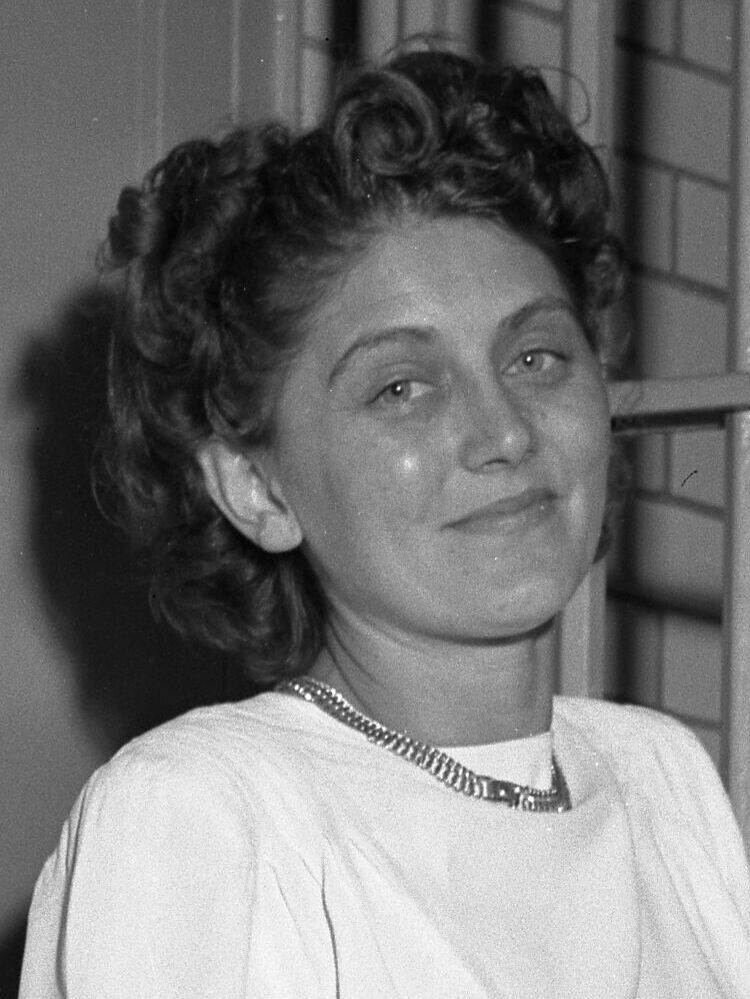
- Healey in 1949
- Born: Dorothy Harriet Rosenblum; September 22, 1914; Denver, Colorado, U.S.
- Died: August 6, 2006 (aged 91); Rockville, Maryland, U.S.
- Occupation: Political activist
- Political party: Communist Party USA (1932–1973); New American Movement (1974–1982); Democratic Socialists of America (after 1982)

Dorothy Ray Healey (September 22, 1914 – August 6, 2006) was a long-time activist in the Communist Party USA (CPUSA) from the late 1920s to the 1970s. In the 1930s, she was one of the first union leaders to advocate for the rights of Chicanos and African Americans as factory and field workers.

During the decades of the 1950s and 1960s, Healey was one of the leading public figures of the CPUSA in the state of California. An opponent of the Warsaw Pact invasion of Czechoslovakia in 1968 and at odds with the orthodox pro-Soviet leadership of Gus Hall, Healey subsequently left the CPUSA to join the New American Movement (NAM), which merged to become part of the Democratic Socialists of America (DSA) in 1982. She became a national vice-chair of the DSA.

== Early life ==
Healey was born Dorothy Harriet Rosenblum in Denver to Hungarian Jewish immigrants on September 22, 1914. Her father's family, the Rosenblums, were proud of their Hungarian background and considered themselves Austro-Hungarians rather than Jews. Her mother's family, on the other hand, were Orthodox Jews, with her maternal grandfather serving as a shokhet, a supervisor of the ritual slaughter of animals to ensure that they were kosher.

Healey was a so-called "red diaper baby". Her mother was won over to socialism as a teenager after hearing a lecture on the subject delivered by J. Stitt Wilson in 1900 and later took part in helping to establish the Communist Party of America. Her father was an apolitical traveling salesman, peddling foodstuffs to grocery stores. Her mother bore six children, one dying at birth and another dying in early childhood. She also performed multiple abortions upon herself, nearly dying of blood poisoning on one occasion, as a result of the procedure when Dorothy was a young girl.

When Dorothy was six, the family relocated to Los Angeles, where she would eventually become known as the "Red Queen of Los Angeles." As her father moved about the West, his family moved with him, and she attended 19 schools before dropping out of high school at age 16. Her father died when she was 16. At 14, she joined the youth section of the Workers Party, the Young Workers League, and the adult Communist Party (CPUSA) itself in 1932, at 18. She was first arrested at age 14 for selling copies of the Daily Worker and making a speech in Skid Row, Oakland. At the behest of the YCL she took a job in a peach processing factory, making 12 cents an hour and hiding when government labor inspectors came looking for underage workers. It was there where she gained her first experience as an organizer. She worked as an organizer for agricultural workers in the Imperial Valley region, becoming international vice president of the United Cannery, Agricultural, Packing, and Allied Workers of America union by the end of the 1930s.

== Leader in party ==
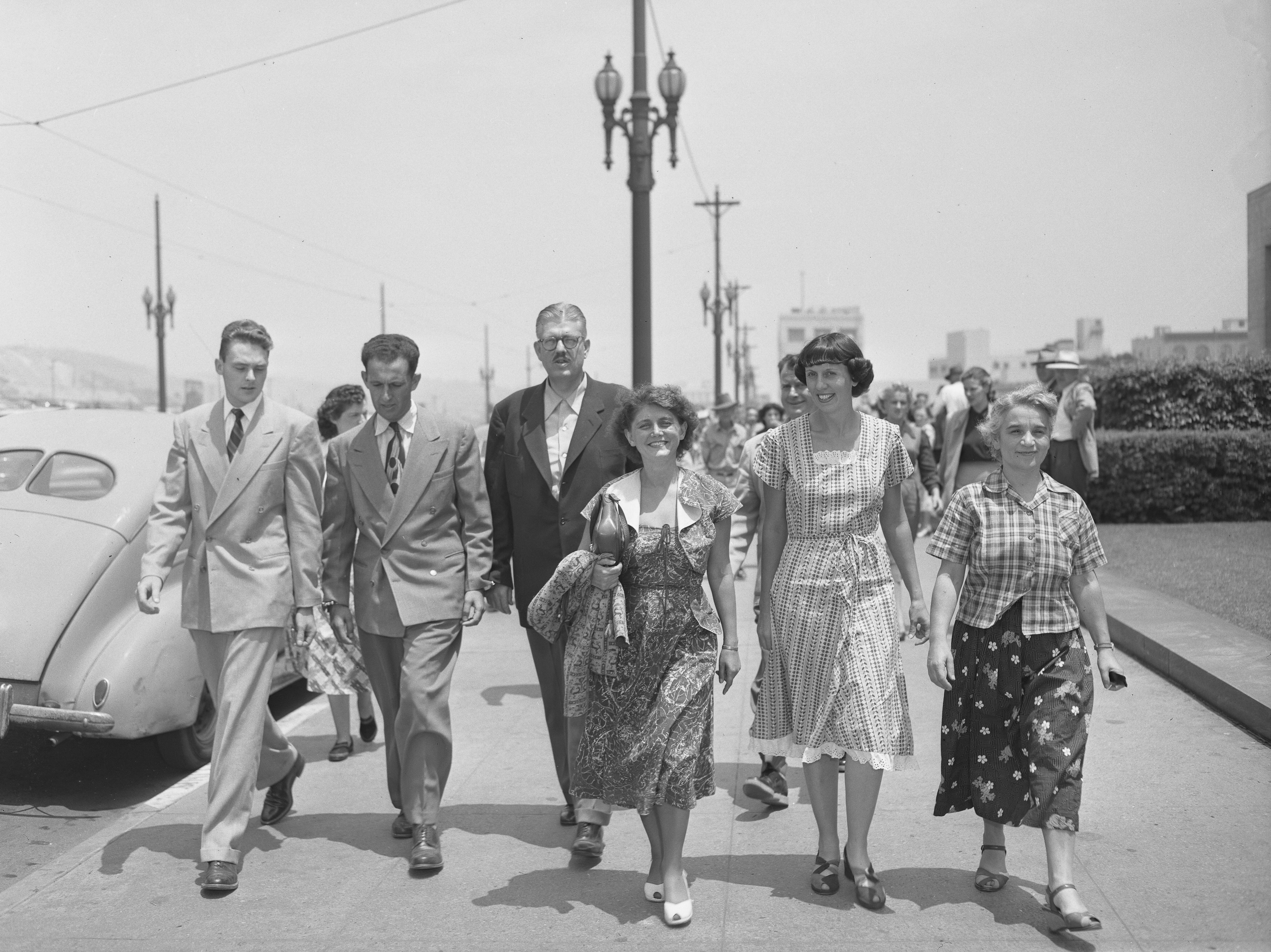
Healey (third from right) and other Communists are arrested by U.S. Marshals for violating the Smith Act, 1951 (L-R): Unknown, Henry Steinberg, Philip Connelly, Dorothy Healey, Unknown, Rose Chernin.

Her convictions about social justice and issues of race, class, unions and labor fueled her activism. From the moment that she joined the CPUSA, she was a true believer. "We knew with absolute conviction that we were part of a vanguard that was destined to lead an American working class to a socialist revolution", she once said. Healey became a successful labor organizer and rose to become the chair of the CPUSA in Southern California. Eventually, she joined the national Party leadership. She mentored many young communists and labor activists. In the 1950s, she and 14 other Californians were convicted under the Smith Act of conspiring to advocate the forceful overthrow of the government. She faced five years in prison and a $10,000 fine before the Supreme Court overturned the conviction in 1957.

In the 1960s, she again faced imprisonment and a hefty fine under a piece of McCarthy-era legislation known as the McCarran Act, when she and others refused to register as agents of a foreign government (the logic being that the CPUSA was under the control of the Soviet Union). In 1965, the Supreme Court reconsidered an earlier decision and found the registration provision to be in violation of the Fifth Amendment guarantee against self-incrimination.

== Break with party ==
In 1956, after the reading of Nikita Khrushchev's speech, "On the Cult of Personality and Its Consequences", which revealed the crimes that Joseph Stalin committed as leader of the USSR, she became outspoken in her insistence for the CPUSA to support democracy and reduce its ties with the Soviets. "The speech went on for four hours, and I was reduced to tears after about 30 minutes," she said. "Fact after fact of monstrous things had happened. It was a relentless account. But I believed it. There was no questioning its authenticity."

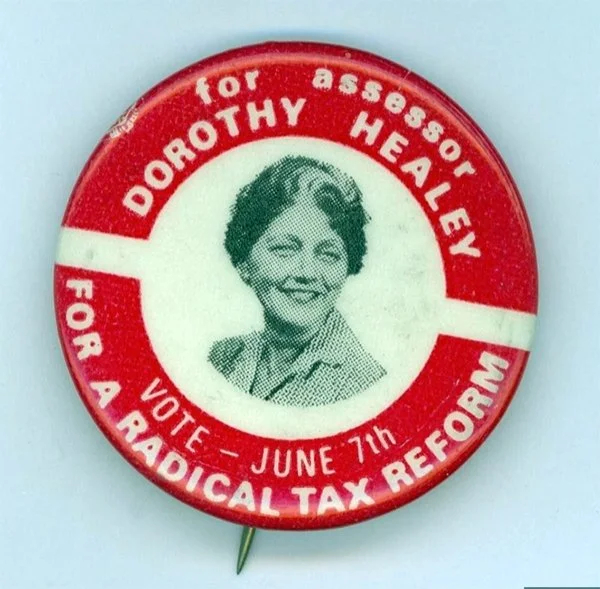
Button from Healey's campaign for Los Angeles County Assessor, 1966

Although many others like novelist Howard Fast left the CPUSA after the revelations of Stalin's crimes, Healey tried to reform it from within. Her story is told in a book she wrote with historian Maurice Isserman, Dorothy Healey Remembers: A Life in the American Communist Party (1990), in which she revealed "the aspirations, commitment, illusions -- and, ultimately, disillusionment -- of a generation of young Communists" who joined the movement before and during the Great Depression.

She resigned from her leadership post in 1968, after Soviet Party Boss Leonid Brezhnev ordered Soviet and Warsaw Pact troops to crush the democratic socialist movement in Czechoslovakia. She stayed in the party until 1973, when she resigned in a dispute with CPUSA General Secretary Gus Hall over issues of orthodoxy, to which she could no longer conform. The end came when she could no longer hold her tongue and publicly criticized the Party.

== Later life ==
In 1974, Healey joined the New American Movement, and in 1975, she became a member of its national interim committee. Later, she supported the merger of NAM with the Democratic Socialist Organizing Committee in 1982, to form the Democratic Socialists of America. Through her involvement with NAM and the Democratic Socialists, she provided an important link between the activists of the 1930s and the younger generation inspired by the popular movement against the Vietnam War. Healey became a national vice chair of DSA, and said in 1984, "So that potentially, what DSA represents, if ever realized, can be enormously exciting and important in the country."

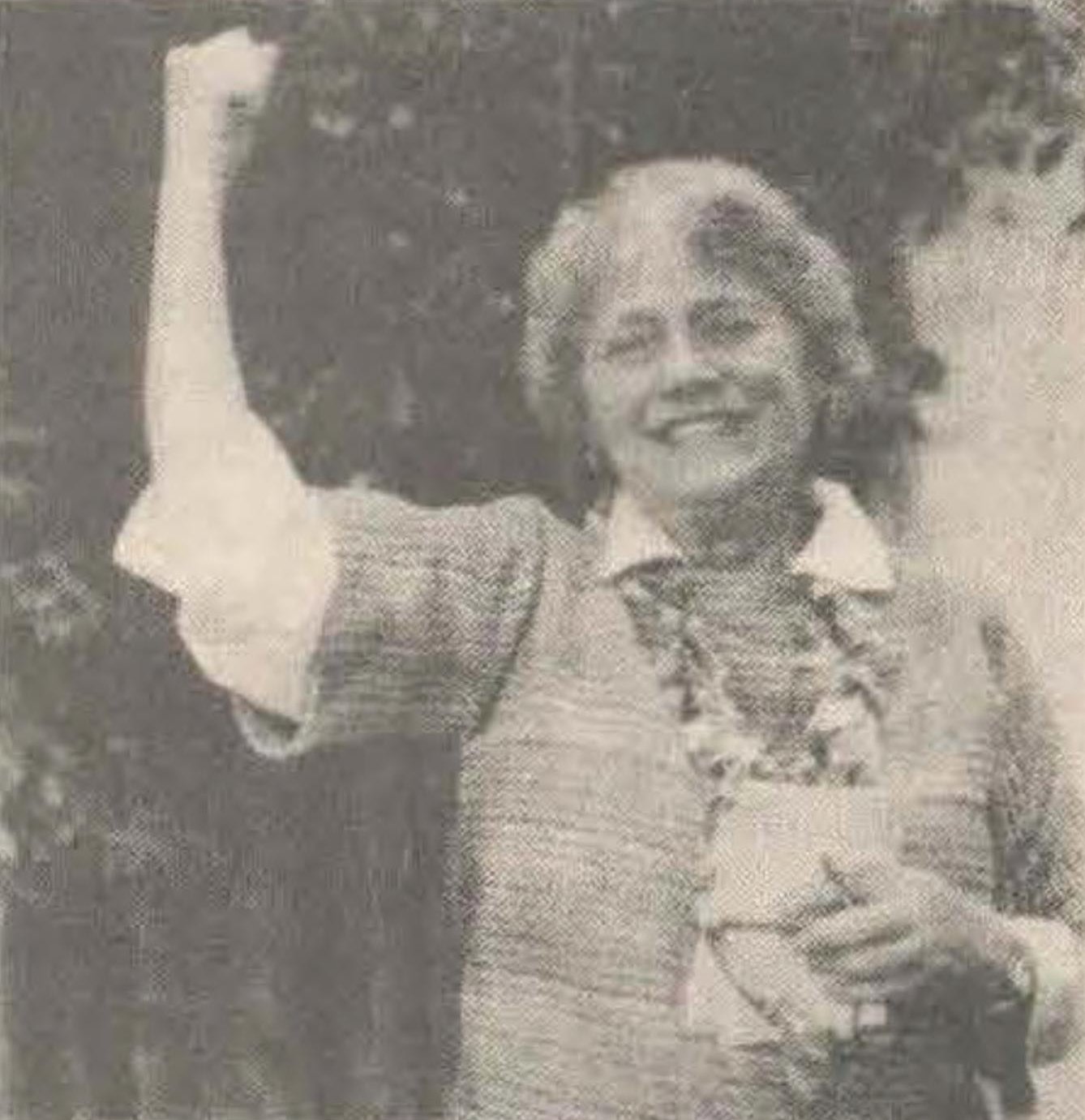
Healey in 1983

Healey moved to Washington, D.C., in 1983 to live with her son, Richard Healey, to help raise her grandchildren. She broadcast on Pacifica Radio in Los Angeles from 1959, and in Washington, she and Richard co-hosted "Dialogue," an hour-long public affairs show on WPFW on Wednesday mornings. Healey joined the D.C. Statehood Party after living in the city.

Dorothy Ray Healey was married to, in her own words, "three good men": Lon Sherman, Don Healey, and Phillip Connelly. All three marriages ended in divorce.

She once wrote: "My hatred of capitalism, which degrades and debases humans, is as intense now as it was when I joined the Young Communist League in 1928. I remain a communist, as I have been all my life, albeit without a party."

== Death ==
Healey died of respiratory failure and pneumonia at age 91 on August 6, 2006 at the Hebrew Home of Greater Washington in Rockville, Maryland.

== Legacy ==
Healey's extensive collection of papers and other material on the CPUSA is archived at the California State University, Long Beach library. Healey is featured in two documentaries, Seeing Red (1983) and Dorothy Healey: An American Red (1984).
