= National Association of Die Casting Workers =

The National Association of Die Casting Workers (NADCW) was a labor union representing workers involved in casting metal in the United States and Canada.

The union was founded in 1934, largely on the initiative of Edward T. Cheyfitz, who became its national secretary. In 1937, it affiliated to the Congress of Industrial Organizations, at which time, it had about 4,750 members. In 1942, it became part of the International Union of Mine, Mill and Smelter Workers. By 1948, it had 20,000 members, at which time it transferred to the United Automobile Workers.
