= Giovanni Rossi Lomanitz =

American physicist

Giovanni Rossi
- Born: Giovanni Rossi Lomanitz; October 10, 1921; Bryan, Texas, U.S.
- Died: December 31, 2002 (aged 81); Pahoa, Hawaii, U.S.
- Education: University of Oklahoma (BS); University of California, Berkeley; Cornell University (MS, PhD)
- Scientific career
- Workplaces: Lawrence Radiation Laboratory; Fisk University; Whitman College; New Mexico Tech
- Thesis: Second Order Effects in the Electron-Electron Interaction (1951)
- Doctoral advisor: Richard Feynman

Giovanni Rossi Lomanitz (10 October 1921 – 31 December 2002) was an American physicist.

== Biography ==
He was born in Bryan, Texas, and grew up in Oklahoma. His family is Jewish and originally from Poland. His father was an agricultural chemist and named his son after the Italian socialist Giovanni Rossi, who had founded an agricultural commune in Brazil in the 1890s. Lomanitz graduated from high school at age 14 and went on to earn his bachelor of science degree in physics from the University of Oklahoma and his doctorate in theoretical physics in 1951 from Cornell University under Richard Feynman.

In the early 1940s, Lomanitz started graduate school at the University of California, Berkeley. While there, he became a protégé of the physicist J. Robert Oppenheimer. Lomanitz worked at the Berkeley Radiation Laboratory on a new method of electromagnetic separation of isotopes. Lomanitz's graduate research was cut short when the Counterintelligence Corps ensured he was drafted into the Army during World War II.

During the period between 1942-45, Oppenheimer was responsible for the employment of Lomanitz on the atomic bomb project. Oppenheimer urged him to work on the Manhattan Project, although Oppenheimer later told government security personnel that he knew Lomanitz had been very much of a "red" when he first came to the University of California. Oppenheimer said he told Lomanitz that he must forgo all political activity if he came onto the project. In August 1943, Oppenheimer protested against the termination of Lomanitz's military deferment and requested that he be returned to the project after his entry into the military service.

While at the Radiation Laboratory, Lomanitz helped to establish a local chapter of the Federation of Architects, Engineers, Chemists, and Technicians (FAECT), a small white-collar communist-aligned CIO union.

The Federal Bureau of Investigation had placed a listening device in the residence of Communist Party activist Steve Nelson, and in October 1942 overheard a man referred to as "Joe", whom the FBI suspected of being Lomanitz's close friend Joseph Weinberg, describing to Nelson the significance and technical outlines of the secret nuclear research done at Berkeley. Future spying for the Soviet Union was implied. This led the United States Government to push Weinberg, Lomanitz, and David Bohm out of the program. For Lomanitz, this process of removal involved the termination of his draft deferment. He was drafted and served in the Pacific. After the war he returned for a time to Berkeley and then moved to Cornell, where he completed his PhD under Richard Feynman.

After the war, Lomanitz was called to testify before the House Un-American Activities Committee. He adamantly asserted his loyalty to the United States and invoked the Fifth Amendment, and declined to name others involved with Communist activities.

The Atomic Energy Commission Personnel Security Board (PSB) found in 1954 that Oppenheimer had stated in 1943 that he did not want anybody working on the project who was a member of the Communist Party, since "one always had a question of divided loyalty" and the discipline of the Communist Party was very severe and not compatible with complete loyalty to the project. Oppenheimer, however, did not identify former members of the Communist Party who were working on the project to appropriate authorities.

Lomanitz then worked at several jobs, including as a railroad maintenance worker.

In 1962, he began working at the New Mexico Institute of Mining and Technology and later became department chairman, before retiring in 1991. He later moved to Pahoa, Hawaii and died of cancer there at the end of 2002.

== In popular culture ==
In the 2023 film Oppenheimer, directed by Christopher Nolan, Lomanitz was portrayed by actor Josh Zuckerman.

In the 1980 BBC miniseries Oppenheimer, Lomanitz was portrayed by actor Anthony Forrest.
