= Food, Tobacco, Agricultural, and Allied Workers =

American labor union

The United Cannery, Agricultural, Packing, and Allied Workers of America union (UCAPAWA) changed its name to Food, Tobacco, Agricultural, and Allied Workers (FTA) in 1944.

== History ==
The FTA sought to further organize cannery units and realized the best way to do this would be through organizing women and immigrant workers and in 1945 started finding success to these ends. The FTA started to experience problems when the International Brotherhood of Teamsters (IBT) began interfering in its organizing efforts. The IBT was affiliated with the American Federation of Labor (AFL) and the FTA was affiliated with its rival, the radical, Congress of Industrial Organizations (CIO). The IBT union was more conservative in regards to women and immigrant workers. It did not have much interest in integrating them into the union. It was far more concerned with making sweetheart deals and collecting union dues. This willingness to maintain the status quo made the IBT a favorite among California Processors and growers. This meant that they signed more contracts with processors and growers than the FTA, which ultimately undermined the more radical FTA union. The Taft-Hartley Act of 1947 further damaged the FTA. This act stated that American labor unions could not have communist ties and the FTA had many. Because of this act many of the organizers either left the union or were deported. It was at this time that the FTA as a whole was expelled from the CIO. This put the IBT in the center of the California cannery industry and it remained there for the next two decades.

Shortly after expulsion from the CIO, FTA absorbed the International Fishermen and Allied Workers of America. It then merged with the United Office and Professional Workers of America and the Distributive Workers Union (formed by locals that had just left the Retail, Wholesale and Department Store Union) to create the Distributive, Processing, and Office Workers of America (DPOWA). Internal disputes and political pressures brought about DPOWA's demise by 1954, when it merged with the Retail, Wholesale and Department Store Union.

== Communism and Anti-Communism ==
The Food, Tobacco, Agricultural, and Allied Workers (FTA) have had constant ideological and political battles between the Congress of Industrial Organizations (CIO). A lot of what caused this constant friction was that the FTA had a lot of members who were involved with various communist parties and/or organizations. More importantly, "The real active Communist Party leaders within the union." The most prominent active Communist Party members within the FTA included Theodosia Simpson, Velma Hopkins, Viola Brown, Moranda Smith, Christine Gardner, Robert Black, Clark Sheppard, John Henry Miller, Jethro Dunlap, and Vivian Bruce. The anti-communist sentiment of not only the more conservative/liberal labor unions, but the national community at large felt that the "Communist Inspired" militant party members prevented settlements at the time of negotiations. The general sentiment perceived that the tactics the Communist Party members of the FTA used would "lead to trouble and possibly to race rioting." Phillip Murray President of the CIO had held strong anti-communist political and theoretical beliefs, but even he himself was convinced that "anti-communism played into the hands of labor’s enemies." Phillip Murray held and shared many of the core beliefs that members of the Communist Party in the FTA and the FTA in general agreed to. Some of those beliefs included, "continued cooperation between the United States and the Soviet Union, and he was committed to maintaining the CIO as an inclusive federation of politically diverse industrial unions." Despite having conflict with the FTA, Murray felt that organizing against labor’s enemies was more beneficial to workers as opposed to focusing energy fighting against the FTA whose political and tactics mirrored those of the Communist Party.

== Interracialism ==
At a time when big labor unions were racially prejudiced, the Food, Tobacco, Agricultural, and Allied Workers (FTA) took a stance of organizing community members of racial backgrounds. African American and Black members of the FTA held high ethics of racial pride and had held a strong foundation of solidarity that transcended the boundaries of race. For African American/Black members of the FTA, the black church had played a huge influence on their politics of interracialism. The black church held the belief "whites would cast off the sin of racism and embrace the brotherhood of all people, in part by the secular radicalism of a left-led union, and in part by popular anticolonialism." Organizers of FTA and local black and white leaders were diligent in seeking to break down any racial barriers that would prevent class solidarity from prospering. In 1944, the FTA had found themselves on the tail end of a controversial issue that had arisen in a court hearing that had to do with the contract negotiations between Reynolds and Local 22. White workers in the Employees Association were involved in a shouting match that broke out between union leaders, which ultimately resulted in William Deberry being charged with assaulting a white woman. This caused problems for the FTA because the public had predicted that FTA’s principles of "race mixing" would lead to violence and violation.

== Operation Dixie ==
Beginning in 1946, in an effort to organize the largely unorganized south, CIO officials began what is called Operation Dixie. This was done for multiple reasons, the first being it sought to organize the Southern textile industry in order to close the wage gap that existed between the North and South stopping the potential flight risk from the North due to the cheap, organized labor that was available in the South. Second, this effort was also an assault on the Bourbons who until then had been the ruling southern power. To start CIO flooded the streets with 200 organizes in what was called the "Holy Crusade" of organizing. This movement quickly inspired the AFL to engage in the same organizing efforts beginning a competition between the two groups. Out of fear that it could potentially lose some of its less radical unions the FTA joined the organizing efforts. The FTA was a vital part of Operation Dixie and its effects can be seen by what it accomplished in North Carolina where they won 25 elections against the AFL. This was despite the fact that this organizing was done in the midst of a Jim Crow south. In the end, it was the Jim Crow laws and the resulting racial strife that contributed to the defeat of this campaign.
