= Canadian Office and Professional Employees Union =

Trade union

- Abbreviation: COPE
- Predecessor: Office and Professional Employees International Union
- Formation: 2004; 22 years ago
- Type: Trade union
- Location: Canada
- Members: 35,000 (2023)
- Official languages: English; French
- President: Annette Toth
- Affiliations: Canadian Labour Congress; IndustriALL Global Union; Public Services International; UNI Global Union
- Website: copesepb.ca

The Canadian Office and Professional Employees Union (COPE; French: Syndicat canadien des employées et employés professionnels et de bureau) is a Canadian labour union representing approximately 35,000 white-collar workers, in both the private and public sectors, in 35 locals across Canada.

Composed of former locals of the American-based Office and Professional Employees International Union (OPEIU), in 2004, 74 per cent of Canadian members voted in favour of forming their own, autonomous Canadian union. In June of that year, Canadian delegates withdrew from proceedings at the OPEIU international convention and formed COPE.

COPE is a member of the Canadian Labour Congress.

== Regions ==
COPE is divided into four regions:

- Region 1: Quebec - covers 12 local unions comprising some 15,000 members, mostly office, technical and professional employees.
- Region 2: Ontario - covers 19 local unions representing about 7,000 workers in various public and private sectors such as health care, education, financial services, labour organizations, non-profit agencies, and government agencies.
- Region 3: Alberta, Saskatchewan and Manitoba - plus Nunavut and the Northwest Territories. This region covers 2 local unions that have a total of about 2,100 members.
- Region 4: British Columbia is a single composite local union styled "MoveUP", representing more than 12,000 members at public and private sector companies. It also provides services to the Yukon territory.
