= John V. Riffe =

American labor unionist

John Vernon Riffe (March 15, 1904 – January 7, 1958) was an American labor unionist.

Born in Jenkins, Kentucky, Riffe worked at a local coal mine from the age of 14, initially as a trapper, and then as a mule driver. He joined the United Mine Workers of America, and was elected as president of his local union when only 16 years old. In 1933, he was appointed as a full-time organizer for the union, based in West Virginia.

In 1936, Riffe began working for the Steel Workers Organizing Committee (SWOC), and he was fired upon by police during the 1937 Memorial Day massacre. Moving to cover various areas of the country, he organized large numbers of workers in steel mills for the SWOC and its successor, the United Steel Workers of America (USWA). During World War II, he served on the Cincinnati Regional War Labor Board. After the war, he was appointed as chief assistant to Van Bittner in the Congress of Industrial Organizations (CIO) drive to organize workers in southern states, and in 1950 he became director of the campaign. In 1953, he was appointed as executive vice-president of the CIO, but he achieved little due to illness, and controversially devoted part of his time to the Moral Re-Armament movement.

The CIO merged into the AFL-CIO in 1955, following which Riffe became an international representative for the USWA. He died in 1958.

Trade union offices
Preceded by Allan Haywood	Executive Vice President of the Congress of Industrial Organizations; 1953–1955	Succeeded by Federation merged
