= Leather Workers' International Union of America =

North American labor union

The Leather Workers' International Union of America (LWU) was a labor union representing workers in the leather industry in the United States and Canada.

The union was founded on January 14, 1955, as the Leather Workers' Organizing Committee. Its founding affiliates were some former locals of the International Fur and Leather Workers' Union, which had opposed that union's merger into the Amalgamated Meat Cutters and Butcher Workmen. On November 2, it was chartered by the Congress of Industrial Organizations as the LWIU.

In December 1955, the union affiliated to the new AFL-CIO, and by 1957, it had 5,743 members. Its membership fell to only 2,110 in 1980, and on February 3, 1992, it merged into the Office and Professional Employees' International Union.

== Presidents ==
1955: R. J. Thomas
1955: Richard B. O'Keefe
1971: Arthur Cecelski
1980s: James L. Sawyer
