= Allan Haywood =

Labor union leader

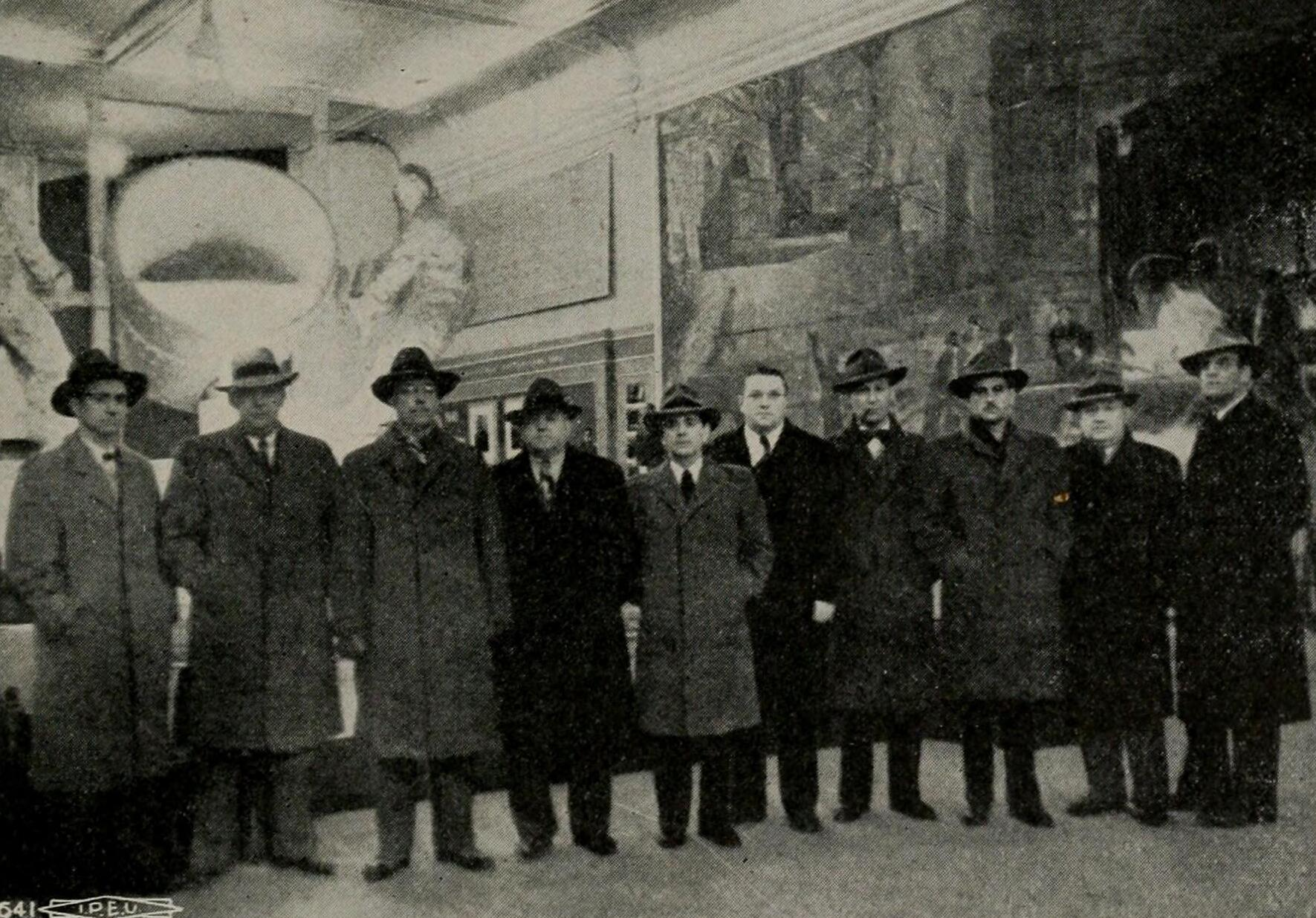
Haywood (fourth from left) and other members of a CIO delegation to the Soviet Union, 1945

Allan Shaw Haywood (January 9, 1888 – February 21, 1953) was an English-born American labor union leader.

Born in Monk Bretton, in England, Haywood began working with his father in a local coal mine, at the age of 13, and joined the Yorkshire Miners' Association. In 1906, he emigrated to the United States, still working in mining, initially in Witt, Illinois, and then in Taylorville, Illinois. He immediately joined the United Mine Workers of America, and soon became a full-time organizer for the union. He became vice-president of his sub-district, then president, and then represented his district on the national executive.

The president of the United Mine Workers, John L. Lewis, was a leading figure in the formation of the Committee for Industrial Organization (CIO), and Haywood strongly supported the initiative. He was seconded to the United Rubber Workers of America in 1936, as an adviser, then in 1937, he became the CIO's regional director for New York City. During this period, he also chaired the Utility Workers Organizing Committee, and was president of the New York State Industrial Union Council.

In 1939, Haywood was appointed as the CIO's director of organization, and from 1942 was also a vice-president of the federation. He travelled the country, speaking and negotiating on behalf of the CIO, and became known as "Mr CIO". At various times, he chaired organizing committees for telephone workers, federal workers, paper workers, and railroad workers. During World War II, he also served on the advisory committee to the Council of National Defense, and the labor advisory committee of the Office of Price Mobilization.

In 1951, Haywood was given the title of executive vice-president of the CIO, officially its second-in-command. The following year, he stood for the presidency of the federation, but was defeated by Walter Reuther. He died of a heart attack the following year, while giving a speech in Wilkes-Barre.

Trade union offices
Preceded by New position	Executive Vice President of the Congress of Industrial Organizations; 1951–1953	Succeeded by John V. Riffe
