= Michael Goodwin (unionist) =

Michael Goodwin (born October 12, 1942) is a former American labor union leader.

Born in Staten Island, Goodwin began working as an organizer for the Office and Professional Employees International Union in 1967. In 1977, he became secretary-treasurer of the union's local 153, and then in 1979, he was elected as a vice president of the international union. He was elected president of the union in 1994, and the following year he was also elected vice president of the AFL-CIO.

As leader of the union, Goodwin focused on organizing more workers, including part-time workers, and adapting to challenges around technological change and declining healthcare provision. He received numerous awards, including the Ellis Island Medal of Honor, and was president of the American Labor Museum. He retired from the union in 2016.

Trade union offices
Preceded by John Kelly	President of the Office and Professional Employees International Union; 1994–2016	Succeeded by Richard Lanigan
