= International Union of Mine, Mill and Smelter Workers =

North American Labor Union

The International Union of Mine, Mill and Smelter Workers (IUMMSW) was a labor union representing miners and workers in related occupations in the United States and Canada.

The union played an important role in the protection of workers and in desegregation efforts beginning in 1916 when the Western Federation of Miners (WFM) changed its name to International Union of Mine, Mill and Smelter Workers (IUMMSW), also known as Mine Mill. The union was created in the western United States, and eventually expanded throughout the United States and Canada.

The union was known for its militant measures in dealing with opposing forces, and firm in its opposition to the politics that existed in the country during the Cold War. The Mine Mill union was very active politically from the 1930s to the 1960s, when it merged with the United Steelworkers. Ironically, the principles that the union supported in the workplace often clashed with popular ideology found in the home and community. The philosophies of the union often mirrored communism, and some of its leaders were believed to be members of the Communist Party.

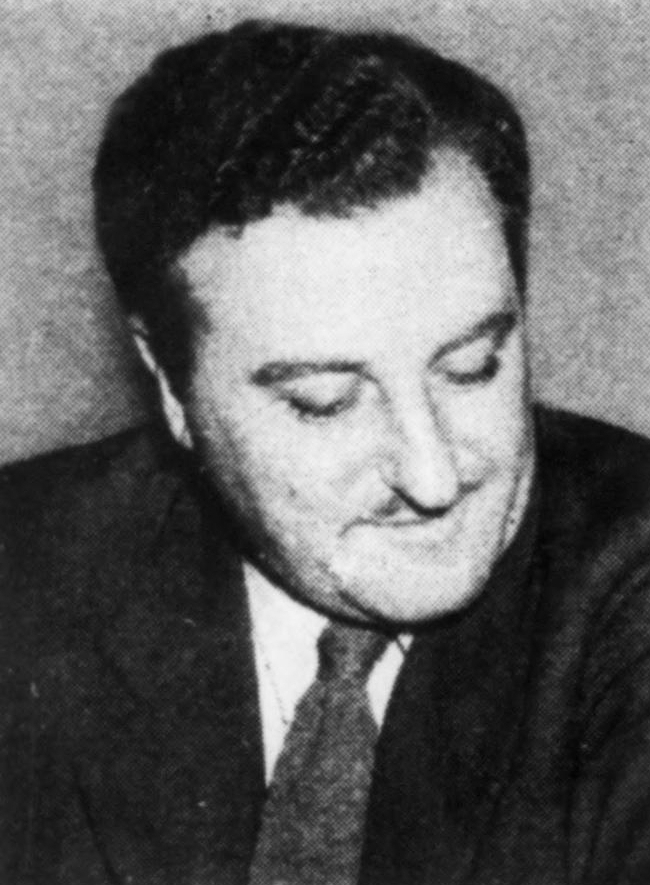
Maurice Travis c. 1949

Just as the nation struggled with the idea of communism in the 1920s, unions were faced with philosophical treatment of those in positions of power. Reid Robinson, IUMMSW president appointed communists to union positions of authority. Anticommunist members called for Robinson to resign in 1947, but were aggravated when they learned that Maurice Travis, a communist, would succeed him. Travis eventually left the party to comply with specifications of the Taft-Hartley Act, but his activities were heavily scrutinized by Senator Joseph McCarthy and his investigators.

In 1942, the union absorbed the National Association of Die Casting Workers. By the 1950s, the International Union of Mine, Mill and Smelter Workers had achieved establishment of approximately 300 locals, with about 37,000 total members in the United States and Canada. Although all locals had some common goals, such as establishing ways to ensure that all workers are treated fairly, each local dealt with issues specific to that group.

== The Cold War ==
During the McCarthy era, Americans were very suspicious of communist sympathizers in their midst. The senator and his followers created fear and panic as they accused Americans of having communist ties, and they tried and punished them for these beliefs. The Taft-Hartley Act of 1947 gave the Federal Bureau of Investigation (FBI) the power to spy on suspected communists. This included tapping phones and other surveillance measures. It also required that union officials remain clear of the communist party and sign statements saying that they were not members. The Smith Act of 1948 gave the government the power to indict suspected communists and the McCarran Act of 1950 established internment camps where those who did not comply could be held. These powerful measures created an atmosphere of fear, and Mine Mill's leaders' ties to the communist beliefs caused debate inside and outside of the union.

Mine Mill leaders in the United States (Philip Murray) and Canada (Aaron Mosher) were both conservatives with a leaning to communist beliefs. During this anti-communist movement among unions, leaders of the United Steel Workers of America (USWA) were encouraged by the Congress of Industrial Organization (CIO) to infiltrate the Mine Mill organization and take over its membership.Throughout its history, USWA attempted to steal away Mine Mill members, often using communism as a dividing factor.

In 1950, the CIO expelled eleven member unions that did not conform to their political standards, including the International Union of Mine, Mill and Smelter Workers (IUMMSW).The CIO leaders assumed that the Mine Mill and other unions’ members could be persuaded to leave their existing affiliations and join with more mainstream groups, but there was not a rush of Mine Mill members to move. The CIO and the Steelworkers groups, who expected to benefit from an exodus, failed to recognize the loyalty of the western mine workers who did not respond to the propaganda that had been sent their way.

Miners in Montana, for example, were more concerned about the Anaconda Copper Mining Company as a threat than they were about communism. They trusted Mine Mill to continue to secure benefits for them.

During the McCarthy era, labor leaders like Harvey Murphy came under scrutiny, but the unions maintained a loyal following. Communist ties of Mine Mill officers caused concern for Americans inside the union, in other unions and the CIO, and those not connected to unions. In order to ensure that labor leaders complied with laws against their membership in the communist party, leaders were required to sign affidavits renouncing any communist ties. Leaders of the Mine Mill Union opposed signing the affidavits based on First Amendment grounds, but eventually they complied. Secretary/Treasurer Maurice Travice publicly renounced his association with the Communist Party, but several of Mine Mill leaders were convicted of falsifying their Taft-Hartley affidavits. James L. Daugherty, the union's chief negotiator, refused to sign an affidavit, and he appealed to the president to stop the indictments against communist sympathizers. Leaders who reluctantly signed the affidavits were later called on charges of falsifying the documents.

== Communist Ties In Mine Mill Union ==
Distrust was in the atmosphere, and the CIO supported several articles, flyers and radio broadcasts aimed to weaken the Mine Mill's position with its members in the 1940s and 1950s. One article, appearing in Maclean’s Magazine, added fuel to the anti-communist fire. Author Pierre Berton reported that Mine Mill smelter workers were producing a dangerous component used in the making of bombs, under the direction of Harvey Murphy. This "heavy water" report, "How a Red Union Bosses Atomic Workers at Trail BC," was untrue, but damaged the union's reputation.

Murphy and other union communist sympathizers were not the only targets of the McCarthy Committee. Many Hollywood figures, including actors, directors, producers and musicians, were called out and accused of un-American acts. A renowned singer, Paul Robeson, was among those suspected of practicing communist acts. He would play a significant role in helping restore Mine Mill's public image.

== The Peace Arch Concerts ==
The Mine Mill leaders became involved in organizing a series of annual concerts that took place between 1952 and 1955 on the United States/Canada border at Vancouver. The events drew thousands of fans of the singer/activist, even when the government plotted to shut him down. Paul Robeson was a man of many talents, some of which earned him a football scholarship to Rutgers University. He spoke several languages and he studied political science, forming distinct opinions about communism. He is best known, however, for his emotion-packed singing of "Ole Man River" in the musical, Show Boat. (2) He was a popular speaker, and his messages promoted freedom and harmony among all people.

Robeson, however, was outspoken about his beliefs, which angered the anti-communist watchdogs. He ignored advice to edit his public statements, praising the Soviets for their achievements and criticizing President Harry Truman for involving the United States in the Korean War. He openly criticized American policies, and the State Department had a thick file on him. Communist sympathizers like Robeson were at risk of being targeted by politicians and anti-communist activists. Although Robeson had a large following in Canada, the American government limited his ability to reach his fans by pulling his passport in 1950, restricting his travel. Robeson's outspoken ways angered anti-communists in both the United States and Canada, and in February 1952 authorities prevented him from appearing in person at a conference sponsored by the Mine Mill leaders. Murphy then promoted another concert to take place in May at the US/Canada border in Blaine, Washington. Murphy had a plan to work around the travel restrictions, and his project became known as the Peace Arch Concerts. Murphy reasoned that although Robeson could not cross the border, they could stand on either side and see activities going on. Murphy arranged for a flatbed truck to be positioned on the American side with Paul using it as a stage as he sang into a phone. A phone line on the other side transmitted the sound of his voice to speakers on the Canadian side. Although the sound quality was somewhat compromised, the passion of his voice and the messages came through clearly.

Robeson received a mixed response to his performance: some were angry and some were pleased that he had circumvent the restrictions placed on his travel. Many of the delegates in attendance equated the performance to a victory for personal freedom. The concerts brought positive media attention to the Mine Mill union and to Robeson. The show of support included about 40,000 people in attendance (2), and news of the concert reached tens of thousands via media. The events drew thousands of fans of the singer/activist, even when the government plotted to shut him down.

== Women’s Roles ==
Women became vulnerable when strikes threatened their survival. Their opinions about union activities were strong, and sometimes contrasted with those of their husbands. In the post-World War II era, working-class families wanted more of a stake in their country, including company profits. Strikes against companies provided union members with a way to challenge, but every strike was a gamble. In order to demand high wages and better benefits, workers went without pay during these strikes—and few could afford the lost income. The USWA took advantage of the situation with Local 117 in Montana using the hardships suffered during strikes to get the attention of strikers, wives and families.The USWA emphasized the importance that union families should live as good Americans, an anti-communist lifestyle.

Union family members all had a stake in the union's activities and wives of the union members often formed support groups associated with the locals. During strikes, women actively supported the union efforts by picketing with the men, fundraising for funds to feed families during the strikes, cooking in strike kitchens and in whatever way necessary, but they had no voice in union decisions. Women formed auxiliary groups to support union locals, but the auxiliaries were independent in organization. When Mary Orlich publicly attacked the Mine Mill's communist ties in her auxiliary presidential platform in 1947, the union was powerless to stop her. She told American women that red unionism threatened their lifestyles, which divided women in their support of the union. Montana union members accused her of meddling and called her disloyal.

== Merger ==
The Mine Mill Union, despite its former strength, finally agreed to a merger with USWA in the 1960s. The ongoing communist leanings of the Mine Mill leaders became unfavorable, and community opposition factored into changes in the members’ positions. Where the union members’ loyalty to Mine Mill was once strong, economic issues lured them to join with the steelworkers. The strength of the USWA negotiations was demonstrated in the wages received by its members. In 1962, the Anaconda local 117 left Mine Mill to join with the steelworkers, and the loss of this local was the beginning of the end for Mine Mill. (3) The USWA had many advantages in recruiting and showed strength in numbers. Despite years of resistance, the two unions merged in 1967.

Local 598 in Sudbury, Ontario, which had a contentious and sometimes violent history with the city's Steelworkers locals, voted against the merger. It remained the last autonomous remnant of Mine Mill until 1993, when it merged with the Canadian Auto Workers.

== See also ==
- Western Federation of Miners
- Salt of the Earth film
- Taft-Hartley Act
- Clarence Darrow
- United States Senate Committee on Education and Labor
- United Steelworkers of America
- Workers' compensation
