= International Fishermen and Allied Workers of America =

US labour union

The International Fishermen and Allied Workers of America (IFAWA) was a labor union representing workers in the fishing industry in the United States.

The union originated as the Federated Fishermen's Council, founded in 1936 by members of the International Seamen's Union, which was collapsing. In 1939, this was refounded as the IUFAW, and was chartered by the Congress of Industrial Organizations (CIO). The former affiliates of the council retained their separate structures, with the new union's four main affiliates being the Alaska Fishermen's Union, Columbia River Fishermen's Protective Union, Copper River and Prince William Sound Fishermen's Union, and the United Fishermen's Union of the Pacific. The union was led by president Joe Jurich, vice president George Hecker, and secretary-treasurer Martin Olsen.

In 1950, the union was expelled from the CIO, which objected to the leading role in the union played by communists. Shortly after, it merged into the Food, Tobacco, Agricultural, and Allied Workers.
