= Congress of Industrial Organizations =

North American federation of labor unions from 1935 to 1955

- Abbreviation: CIO
- Merged into: AFL-CIO
- Founded: November 9, 1935; Pittsburgh, Pennsylvania
- Dissolved: December 4, 1955
- Location: United States

The Congress of Industrial Organizations (CIO) was a federation of unions that organized workers in industrial unions in the United States and Canada from 1935 to 1955. Originally created in 1935 as a committee within the American Federation of Labor (AFL) by John L. Lewis, a leader of the United Mine Workers (UMW), and called the Committee for Industrial Organization. Its name was changed in 1938 when it broke away from the AFL. It focused on organizing 'unskilled' workers, who had been ignored by most of the AFL unions.

The CIO supported Franklin D. Roosevelt and his New Deal coalition, and membership in it was open to African Americans. CIO members voted for Roosevelt overwhelmingly.

Both the CIO and its rival, the AFL, grew rapidly during the Great Depression. The rivalry for dominance was bitter and sometimes violent.

In its statement of purpose, the CIO said that it had formed to encourage the AFL to organize workers in mass production industries along industrial union lines. The CIO failed to change AFL policy from within. On September 10, 1936, the AFL suspended all 10 CIO unions (two more CIO unions had joined the AFL during the previous year). In 1938, these unions formed the Congress of Industrial Organizations as a rival labor federation.

Section 504 of the Taft–Hartley Act of 1947 required union leaders to swear that they were not Communists, which some CIO leaders refused to do; they were expelled. In 1955, the CIO rejoined the AFL, forming the new entity known as the American Federation of Labor and Congress of Industrial Organizations (AFL-CIO).

== Background ==
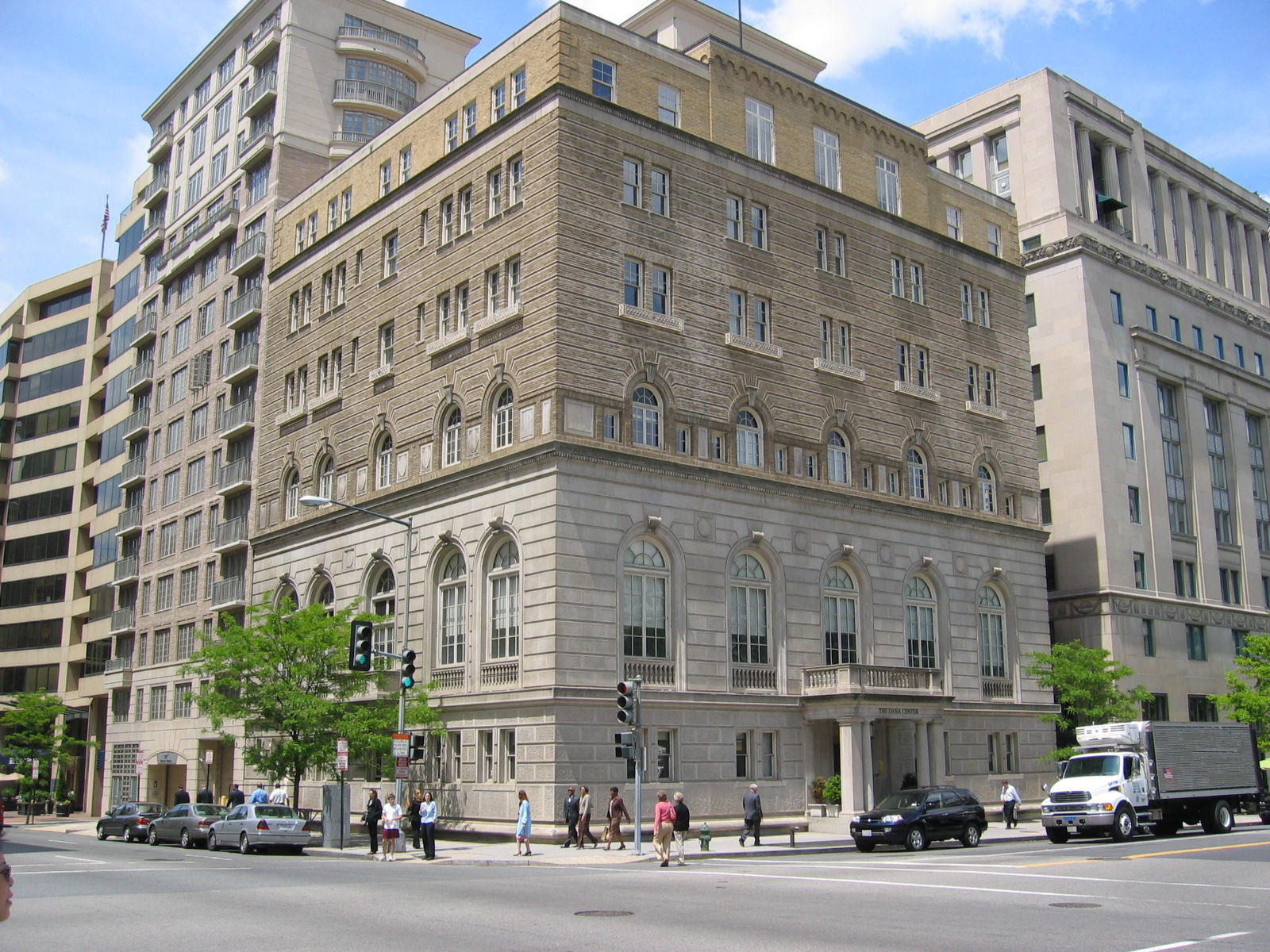
The CIO's second headquarters was an office on the third floor of this building, the United Mine Workers' headquarters, at 900 15th Street NW, Washington, DC.

The CIO was born out of a fundamental dispute within the United States labor movement over whether and how to organize industrial workers. The eight union chiefs who founded the CIO were not happy with how the AFL was unwilling to work with America's manufacturing combines. Those who favored craft unionism believed the most effective way to represent workers was to defend the advantages they had secured through their skills. They focused on the hiring of skilled workers, such as carpenters, lithographers, and railroad engineers in an attempt to maintain as much control as possible over the work their members did by enforcement of work rules, zealous defense of their jurisdiction to certain types of work, control over apprenticeship programs, and exclusion of less-skilled workers from membership.

Craft unionists were opposed to organizing workers on an industrial basis, into unions which represented all of the production workers in a particular enterprise, rather than in separate units divided along craft lines.

The proponents of industrial unionism, on the other hand, generally believed that craft distinctions may have been appropriate in those industries in which craft unions had flourished, such as construction or printing, but they were unworkable in industries such as steel or auto production. In their view, dividing workers in a single plant into a number of different crafts represented by separate organizations, each with its own agenda, would weaken the workers' bargaining power and leave the majority, who had few traditional craft skills, completely unrepresented.

While the AFL had always included a number of industrial unions, such as the United Mine Workers and the Brewery Workers, the most dogmatic craft unionists had a stronghold on power within the federation by the 1930s. They used that power to quash any drive toward industrial organizing.

Industrial unionism became even more fierce in the 1930s, when the Great Depression in the United States caused large membership drops in some unions, such as the United Mine Workers and the International Ladies' Garment Workers' Union. A number of labor leaders, particularly John L. Lewis of the United Mine Workers, came to the conclusion that their own unions would not survive while the great majority of workers in basic industry remained nonunion. They started to press the AFL to change its policies in this area.

The AFL, in fact, responded and added even more new members than the CIO. The AFL had long permitted the formation of "federal" unions, which were affiliated directly with the AFL; in 1933, it proposed to use them to organize workers on an industrial basis. The AFL did not, however, promise to allow the unions to maintain a separate identity indefinitely. That meant the unions might be broken up later to distribute their members among the craft unions that claimed jurisdiction over their work. The AFL, in fact, dissolved hundreds of federal unions in late 1934 and early 1935.

While the bureaucratic leadership of the AFL was unable to win strikes, three victorious strikes suddenly exploded onto the scene in 1934. These were the Minneapolis Teamsters Strike of 1934, the leadership of which included some members of the Trotskyist Communist League of America; the 1934 West Coast Longshore Strike, the leadership of which included some members of the Communist Party USA; and the 1934 Toledo Auto-Lite strike, which was led by the American Workers Party. Victorious industrial unions with militant leaderships were the catalyst that brought about the rise of the CIO.

The AFL authorized organizing drives in the automobile, rubber, and steel industries at its convention in 1934 but gave little financial support or effective leadership to those unions. The AFL's timidity succeeded only in making it less credible among the workers that it was supposedly trying to organize. That was especially significant in those industries, such as auto and rubber, in which workers had already achieved some organizing success, at great personal risk.

The dispute came to a head at the AFL's convention in Atlantic City in 1935. On October 19, the closing day of the convention, William Hutcheson, the President of the United Carpenters, made a slighting comment about a rubber worker who was delivering an organizing report. Lewis responded that Hutcheson's comment was "small potatoes," and the 6-foot-3-inch (1.91 m) Hutcheson replied, "I was raised on small potatoes, that is why I am so small." After some more words, during which Hutcheson called Lewis a "vile name", Lewis punched Hutcheson. The two men collapsed a table and fell on the floor, throwing punches. The incident helped cement Lewis's image in the public eye as someone willing to fight for workers' right to organize.

== History ==
The standard scholarly history by Robert Ziegler provides the historical details.

=== Founding ===
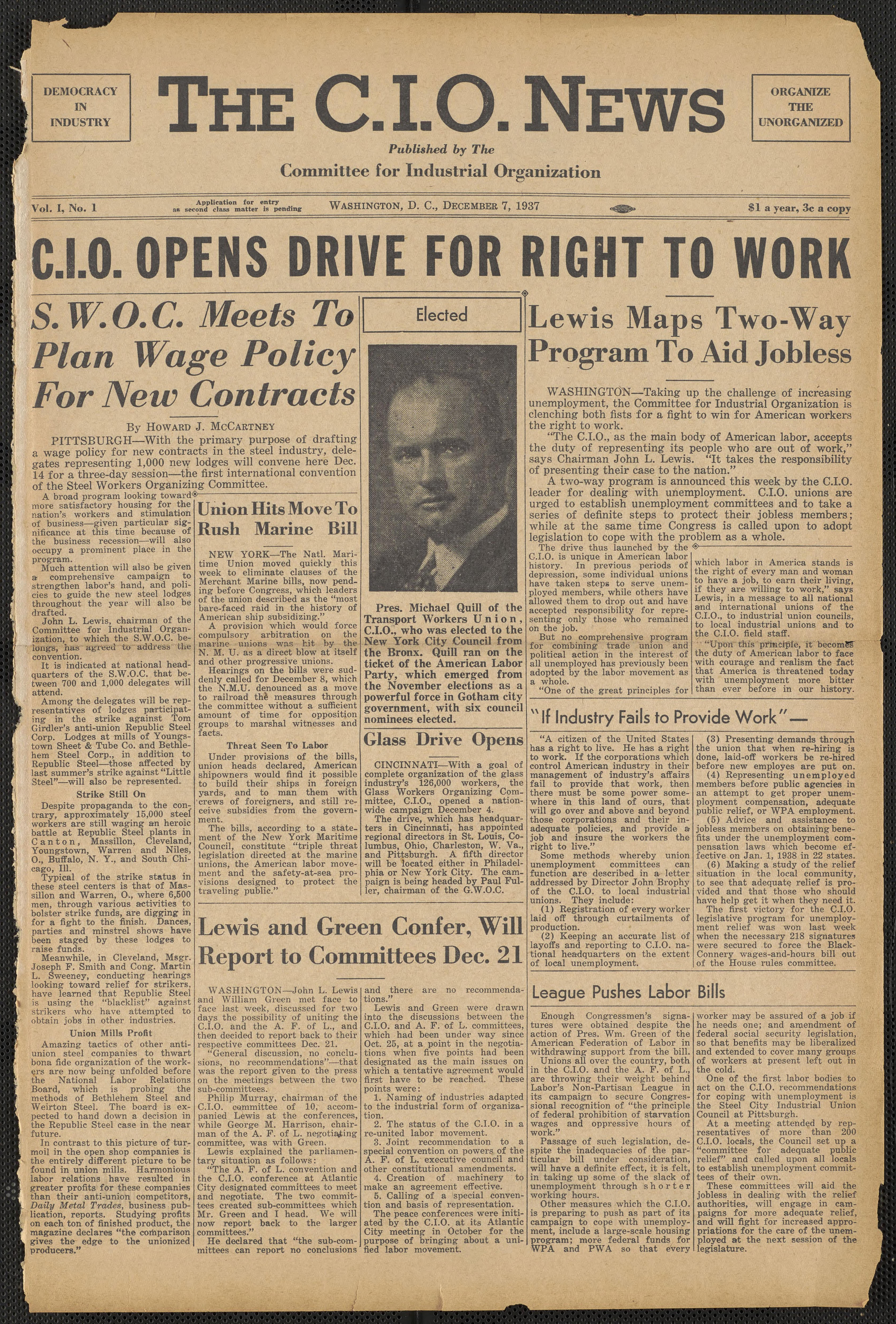
Front page of the first issue of The C.I.O. News featuring New York City Councilman-elect Mike Quill, published December 7, 1937

Shortly afterward, Lewis called together Charles Howard, President of the International Typographical Union; Sidney Hillman, head of the Amalgamated Clothing Workers of America; David Dubinsky, President of the ILGWU, Thomas McMahon, head of the United Textile Workers; John Sheridan of the Mine, Mill and Smelter Workers Union; Harvey Fremming, of the Oil Workers Union; and Max Zaritsky, of the Hatters, Cap and Millinery Workers. They discussed the formation of a new group within the AFL to carry on the fight for industrial organizing. The creation of the Committee for Industrial Organization was announced on November 9, 1935.

Whether Lewis then intended to split the AFL over this issue is debatable; at the outset, the CIO presented itself as only a group of unions within the AFL gathered to support industrial unionism, rather than a group opposed to the AFL itself.

The AFL leadership, however, treated the CIO as an enemy from the outset by refusing to deal with it and demanding that it dissolve. The AFL's opposition to the CIO, however, only increased the stature of the CIO and Lewis in the eyes of the industrial workers who were keen on organizing and were disillusioned with the AFL's ineffective performance. Lewis continued to denounce the AFL's policies, and the CIO offered organizing support to workers in the rubber industry who went on strike and formed the Steel Workers Organizing Committee (SWOC) in defiance of all of the craft divisions that the AFL had required in past organizing efforts. In 1936, Lee Pressman, affiliated with the far left, became the union's general counsel until 1948.

The first major industrial union to be chartered by the CIO, on November 16, 1936, was the United Electrical, Radio and Machine Workers of America (UE).

The subsequent explosive growth of the UE was instrumental for the survival in the early days of the CIO. By the end of 1936, the UE had organized the General Electric plant at Schenectady, New York, and the UE went on to organize 358 more local unions with contracts covering over 600,000 workers, at 1375 plants.

=== Initial triumphs ===
The CIO met with dramatic initial successes in 1937, with the UAW winning union recognition at General Motors Corporation after a tumultuous forty-four-day sit-down strike, while the Steel Workers Organizing Committee (SWOC) signed a collective bargaining agreement with U.S. Steel. Those two victories, however, came about very differently.

The CIO's initial strategy was to focus its efforts in the steel industry and then build from there. The UAW, however, did not wait for the CIO to lead it. Instead, having built up a membership of roughly 25,000 workers by gathering in federal unions and some locals from rival unions in the industry, the union decided to go after GM, the largest carmaker of them all, by shutting down its nerve center, the production complex in Flint, Michigan.

The Flint Sit-Down Strike was a risky and illegal enterprise from the outset: the union was able to share its plans with only a few workers because of the danger that spies employed by GM would alert management in time to stop it, yet needed to be able to mobilize enough to seize physical control of GM's factories. The union, in fact, not only took over several GM factories in Flint, including one that made the dies necessary to stamp automotive body parts and a companion facility in Cleveland, Ohio, but held on to those sites despite repeated attempts by the police and National Guard to retake them and court orders threatening the union with ruinous fines if it did not call off the strike.

While Lewis played a key role in negotiating the one-page agreement that ended the strike with GM's promise to recognize the UAW as the exclusive bargaining representative of its employees for a six months period, UAW activists, rather than CIO staff, led the strike.

The organizing campaign in the steel industry, by contrast, was a top-down affair. Lewis, who had a particular interest in organizing the steel industry because of its important role in the coal industry where UMW members worked, dispatched hundreds of organizers - many of whom were his past political opponents or radicals drawn from the Communist-led unions that had attempted to organize the industry earlier in the 1930s - to sign up members. Lewis was not particularly concerned with the political beliefs of his organizers, so long as he controlled the organization; as he once famously remarked, when asked about the "reds" on the SWOC staff, "Who gets the bird? The hunter or the dog?".

The SWOC signed up thousands of members and absorbed a number of company unions at U.S. Steel and elsewhere, but did not attempt the sort of daring strike that the UAW had pulled off against GM. Instead, Lewis was able to extract a collective bargaining agreement from U.S. Steel, which had previously been an implacable enemy of unions, by pointing to the chaos and loss of business that GM had suffered by fighting the UAW. The agreement provided for union recognition, a modest wage increase and a grievance process. CIO unions signed multiyear contracts, often complicated and long, with GM, U.S. Steel, and other corporations in order to minimize strikes and also make sure employers took care of the work process.

The CIO also won several significant legal battles. Hague v. Committee for Industrial Organization 307 U.S. 496 (1939), arose out of events late in 1937. Jersey City, New Jersey Mayor Frank "Boss" Hague had used a city ordinance to prevent labor meetings in public places and stop the distribution of literature pertaining to the CIO's cause. District and circuit courts ruled in favor of the CIO. Hague appealed to the United States Supreme Court, which held in 1939 that Hague's ban on political meetings violated the First Amendment right to freedom of assembly.

=== Early setbacks and successes ===
The UAW was able to capitalize on its stunning victory over GM by winning recognition at Chrysler and smaller manufacturers. It then focused its organizing efforts on Ford, sometimes battling company security forces as at the Battle of the Overpass on May 26, 1937. At the same time, the UAW was in danger of being torn apart by internal political rivalries. Homer Martin, the first president of the UAW, expelled a number of the union organizers who had led the Flint sit-down strike and other early drives on charges that they were communists. In some cases, such as Wyndham Mortimer, Bob Travis and Henry Kraus, those charges may have been true; in other cases, such as Victor Reuther and Roy Reuther, they were probably not. Those expulsions were reversed at the next convention of the UAW in 1939, which expelled Martin instead. He took approximately 20,000 UAW members with him to form a rival union, known for a time as the UAW-AFL. The SWOC encountered equally serious problems: after winning union recognition after a strike against Jones & Laughlin Steel, SWOC's strikes against the rest of "Little Steel", i.e., Bethlehem Steel Corporation, Youngstown Sheet and Tube, National Steel, Inland Steel American Rolling Mills and Republic Steel failed, in spite of support from organizations like the Catholic Radical Alliance. The steelmakers offered workers the same wage increases that U.S. Steel had offered. In the Memorial Day Massacre on May 30, 1937, Chicago police opened fire on a group of strikers who had attempted to picket at Republic Steel, killing ten and seriously wounding dozens. A month and a half later police in Massillon, Ohio fired on a crowd of unionists, resulting in three deaths.

The CIO became more comfortable with the Democratic Party. It rejected proposals for the creation of an independent labor party, apart from the small left-wing American Labor Party in New York.

The CIO began its own newspaper. It featured articles that were written by big journalists, cartoons, and other political stories. The newspaper had spread to 40% of the CIO's members and had different stories for different areas.

The CIO found organizing textile workers in the South very difficult. As in steel, these workers had abundant recent first-hand experience of failed organizing drives and defeated strikes, which resulted in unionists being blacklisted or worse. In addition, the intense antagonism of white workers toward black workers and the conservative political and religious milieu made organizing even harder.

Adding to the uncertainties for the CIO was its own internal disarray. The CIO formally established itself as a rival to the AFL on April 13, 1938, renaming itself as the Congress of Industrial Organizations on November 16, 1938. The ILGWU and the Millinery Workers left the CIO to return to the AFL. Lewis feuded with Hillman and Philip Murray, his long-time assistant and head of the SWOC, over both the CIO's own activities and its relations with the President Roosevelt's administration. He broke with Roosevelt over foreign policy and endorsed Wendell Willkie for president in 1940. Lewis promised to drop his CIO role if Roosevelt was reelected. Murray was elected to replace him shortly after Roosevelt won the election.

Roosevelt won reelection in a landslide in 1936, and by a closer margin in 1940. Labor unions gave strong support in 1940, compared to very strong support in 1936. The Gallup Poll showed CIO voters declined from 85% in 1935 to 79% in 1940. AFL voters went from 80% to 71%. Other union members went from 74% to 57%. Blue collar workers who were not union members went 72% to 64%.

The Roosevelt administration launched a massive rearmament program after Germany defeated France in spring 1940, and factory employment soared. The UAW finally organized Ford in 1941. The SWOC, now known as the United Steel Workers of America, won recognition in Little Steel in 1941 through a combination of strikes and National Labor Relations Board elections in the same year.

In addition, after the west coast longshoremen organized in the strike led by Harry Bridges in 1934 split from the International Longshoremen's Association in 1937 to form the International Longshoremen's and Warehousemen's Union, the ILWU joined the CIO. Bridges became the most powerful force within the CIO in California and the west. The Transport Workers Union of America, originally representing the subway workers in New York, also joined, as did the National Maritime Union, made up of sailors based on the east coast, and the United Electrical, Radio and Machine Workers.

The AFL continued to fight the CIO, forcing the NLRB to allow skilled trades employees in large industrial facilities the option to choose, in what came to be called "Globe elections," between representation by the CIO or separate representation by AFL craft unions. The CIO now also faced competition, moreover, from a number of AFL affiliates who now sought to organize industrial workers. The competition was particularly sharp in the aircraft industry, where the UAW went head-to-head against the International Association of Machinists, originally a craft union of railroad workers and skilled trade employees. The AFL organizing drives proved even more successful, and they gained new members as fast or faster than the CIO.

=== Growth during World War II ===
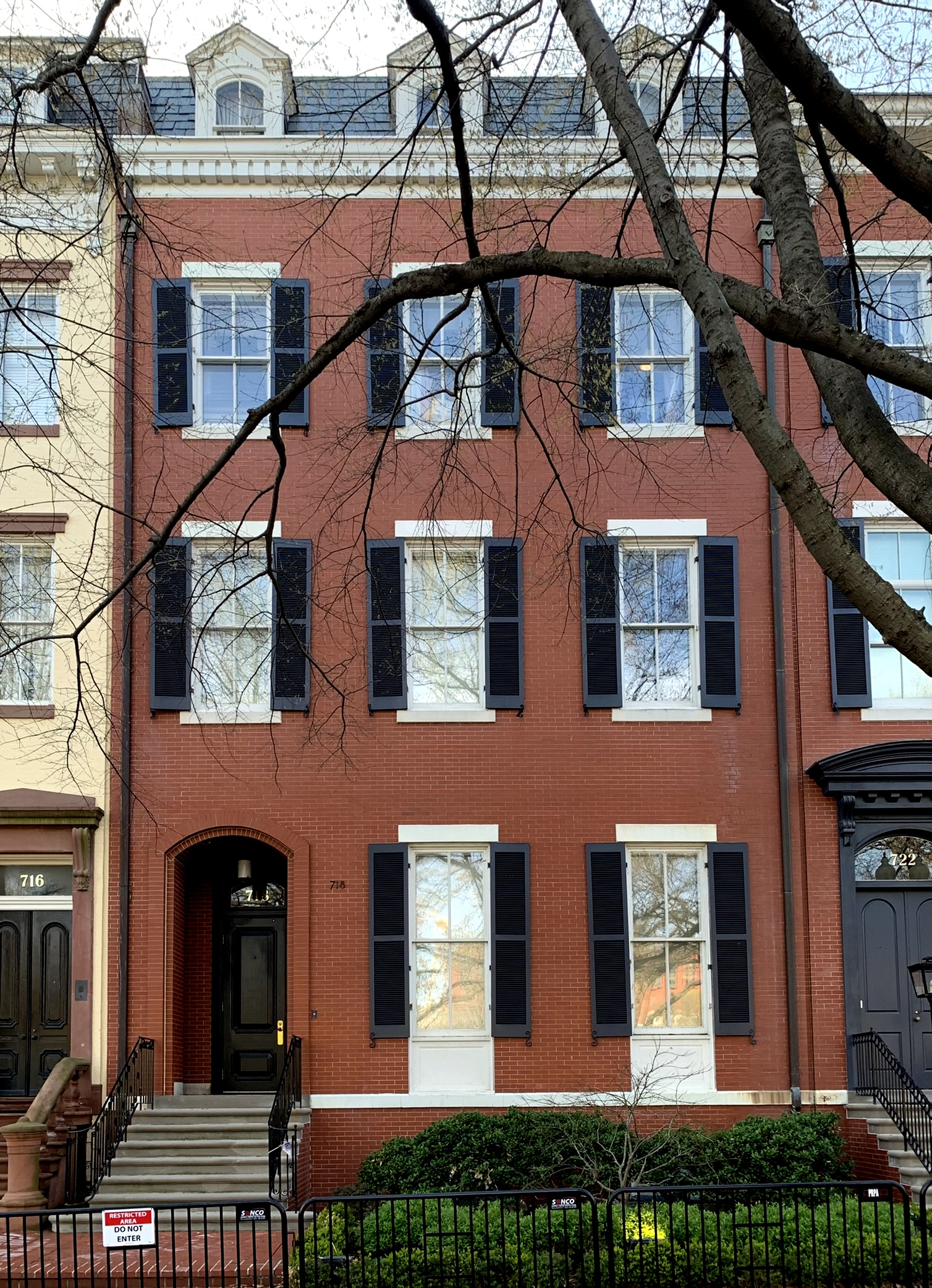
718 Jackson Place NW, Washington, D.C., the fourth and final headquarters for the Congress of Industrial Organizations. As of 2008, the building is owned by the federal government and houses small units attached to the Executive Office of the President.

The unemployment problem ended in the United States with the beginning of World War II, as stepped-up wartime production created millions of new jobs, and the draft pulled young men out. The war mobilization also changed the CIO's relationship with both employers and the national government.

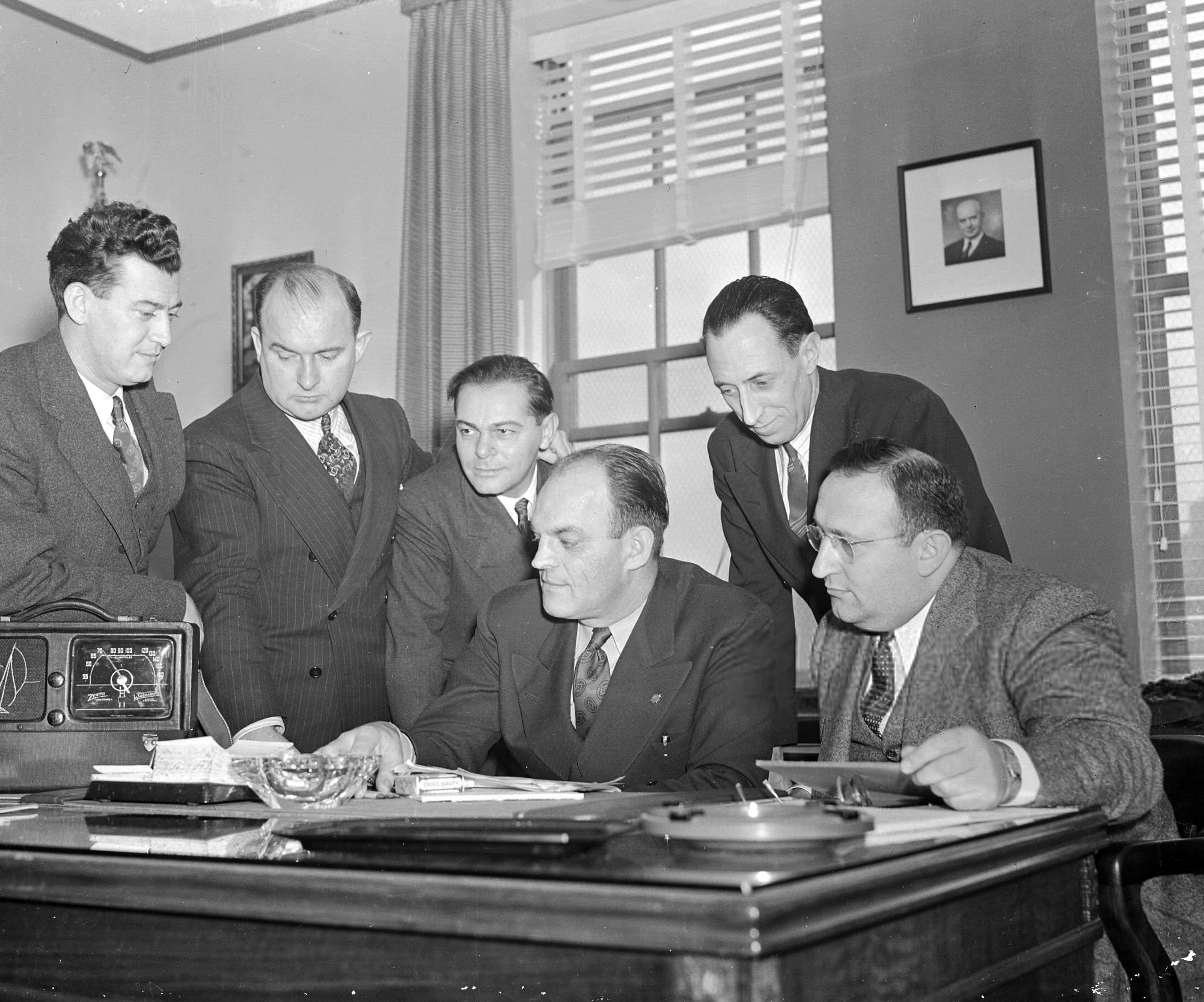
CIO leaders listen to President Roosevelt's Day of Infamy speech before pledging support to the war effort, December 12, 1941 Left to right: Austin Hogan, TWU; Michael Quill, TWU; Ben Gold, IFLWU; Joseph Curran, NMU; Harry Bridges, ILWU, Morris Muster, UFWA

Having failed to negotiate an antifascist alliance with capitalist France and Britain in the eve of the World War II, in August 1939 the Soviet Union signed a non-aggression pact with Nazi Germany, the Molotov–Ribbentrop Pact, which would later be broken by the Nazis. Many Communists in Western parties repudiated this action and resigned their party membership in protest. American Communists took the public position of being opposed to the war against Germany. The Mine Workers led by Lewis, with a strong pro-Soviet presence, opposed Roosevelt's reelection in 1940 and left the CIO in 1942. After June 1941, when Germany invaded the Soviet Union, the Communists became fervent supporters of the war and sought to end wildcat strikes that might hurt war production. The CIO, and in particular the UAW, supported a wartime no-strike pledge that aimed to eliminate not only major strikes for new contracts, but also the innumerable small strikes called by shop stewards and local union leadership to protest particular grievances.

That pledge did not, however, actually eliminate all wartime strikes; in fact, there were nearly as many strikes in 1944 as there had been in 1937. But those strikes tended to be far shorter and far less tumultuous than the earlier ones, usually involving small groups of workers over working conditions and other local concerns.

The CIO did not, on the other hand, strike over wages during the war. In return for labor's no-strike pledge, the government offered arbitration to determine the wages and other terms of new contracts. Those procedures produced modest wage increases during the first few years of the war, but, over time, not enough to keep up with inflation, particularly when combined with the slowness of the arbitration machinery.

Yet even though the complaints from union members about the no-strike pledge became louder and more bitter, the CIO did not abandon it. The Mine Workers, by contrast, who did not belong to either the AFL or the CIO for much of the war, engaged in a successful twelve-day strike in 1943.

But the CIO unions on the whole grew stronger during the war. The government put pressure on employers to recognize unions to avoid the sort of turbulent struggles over union recognition of the 1930s, while unions were generally able to obtain maintenance of membership clauses, a form of union security, through arbitration and negotiation. Workers also won benefits, such as vacation pay, that had been available only to a few in the past while wage gaps between higher skilled and less skilled workers narrowed.

The experience of bargaining on a national basis, while restraining local unions from striking, also tended to accelerate the trend toward bureaucracy within the larger CIO unions. Some, such as the Steelworkers, had always been centralized organizations in which authority for major decisions resided at the top. The UAW, by contrast, had always been a more grassroots organization, but it also started to try to rein in its maverick local leadership during these years.

The CIO also had to confront deep racial divides in its own membership, particularly in the UAW plants in Detroit where white workers sometimes struck to protest the promotion of black workers to production jobs. It also worked on this issue in shipyards in Alabama, mass transit in Philadelphia, and steel plants in Baltimore. The CIO leadership, particularly those in more left unions such as the Packinghouse Workers, the UAW, the NMU, and the Transport Workers, undertook serious efforts to suppress hate strikes, to educate their membership, and to support the Roosevelt Administration's tentative efforts to remedy racial discrimination in war industries through the Fair Employment Practices Commission. Those unions contrasted their relatively bold attack on the problem with the timidity and racism of the AFL.

The CIO unions were less progressive in dealing with sex discrimination in wartime industry, which now employed many more women workers in nontraditional jobs. Some unions who had represented large numbers of women workers before the war, such as the UE and the Food and Tobacco Workers, had fairly good records of fighting discrimination against women; others often saw them as merely wartime replacements for the men in the armed forces.

=== Postwar era ===
The end of the war meant the end of the no-strike pledge and a wave of strikes as workers sought to make up the ground they had lost, particularly in wages, during the war. The UAW went on strike against GM in November 1945; the Steelworkers, UE, and Packinghouse Workers struck in January 1946.

Murray, as head of both the CIO and the Steelworkers, wanted to avoid a wave of mass strikes in favor of high-level negotiations with employers, with government intervention to balance wage demands with price controls. That project failed when employers showed that they were not willing to accept the wartime status quo, but instead demanded broad management rights clauses to reassert their workplace authority, while the new Truman administration proved unwilling to intervene on labor's side.

The UAW took a different tack: rather than involve the federal government, it wanted to bargain directly with GM over management issues, such as the prices it charged for its cars, and went on strike for 113 days over these and other issues. The union eventually settled for the same wage increase that the Steelworkers and the UE had gotten in their negotiations; GM not only did not concede any of its managerial authority, but never even bargained over the UAW's proposals over its pricing policies.

These strikes were qualitatively different from those waged over union recognition in the 1930s: employers did not try to hire strikebreakers to replace their employees, while the unions kept a tight lid on picketers to maintain order and decorum even as they completely shut down some of the largest enterprises in the United States.

The CIO's major organizing drive of this era, Operation Dixie, aimed at the textile workers of the American South, was a complete failure. The CIO was reluctant to confront Jim Crow segregation laws. Although the Steelworkers' Southern outpost in the steel industry remained intact, the CIO and the union movement as a whole remained marginalized in the Deep South and surrounding states.

In July 1943, the CIO formed the first-ever political action committee in the United States, the CIO-PAC, to help elect Roosevelt.

In 1946, the Republican Party took control of both the House and Senate. That Congress passed the Taft–Hartley Act, which made organizing more difficult, gave the states the authority to pass right to work laws, and outlawed certain types of strikes and secondary boycotts. It also required all union officers to sign an affidavit that they were not Communist Party members in order for the union to bring a case before the NLRB. This affidavit requirement, later declared unconstitutional by the United States Supreme Court, was the first sign of serious trouble ahead for a number of Communists in the CIO.

In 1947, the CIO gave financial and moral support to the National Federation of Telephone Workers (NFTW) during the national 1947 Telephone strike even though the NFTW was not a CIO member.

=== Purging the communists ===
The Taft–Hartley Act of 1947 penalized unions whose officers failed to sign statements that they were not members of the Communist Party. Many Communists held power in the CIO unions (few did so in the AFL). The most affected unions were the ILWU, UE, TWU, United Public Workers, and Fur and Leather Workers. Other Communists held senior staff positions in a number of other unions.

The leftists had an uneasy relationship with Murray while he headed the CIO. He mistrusted the radicalism of some of their positions and was innately far more sympathetic to anti-Communist organizations such as the Association of Catholic Trade Unionists. He also believed, however, that making anti-Communism a crusade would only strengthen labor's enemies and the rival AFL at a time when labor unity was most important.

Murray might have let the status quo continue, even while Walter Reuther and others within the CIO attacked Communists in their unions, if the CPUSA had not chosen to back Henry A. Wallace's Progressive Party campaign for president in 1948. That, and an increasingly bitter division over whether the CIO should support the Marshall Plan, brought Murray to the conclusion that peaceful co-existence with Communists within the CIO was impossible.

Murray began by removing Bridges from his position as the California Regional Director for the CIO and firing Lee Pressman as General Counsel of both the Steelworkers and the CIO. Anti-communist unionists then took the battle to the City and State Councils where they ousted Communist leaders who did not support the CIO's position favoring the Marshall Plan and opposing Wallace.

After the 1948 election, the CIO took the fight one step further, expelling the International Longshore and Warehouse Union; International Union of Mine, Mill, and Smelter Workers; Food and Tobacco Workers; and the International Fur and Leather Workers Union after a series of internal trials in the first few months of 1950, while creating a new union, the International Union of Electrical, Radio and Machine Workers (which later merged with the Communications Workers of America), to replace the United Electrical, Radio and Machine Workers (UE), which left the CIO.

=== Merger with the AFL ===
Reuther succeeded Murray, who died in 1952, as head of the CIO. William Green, who had headed the AFL since the 1920s, died the same month. Reuther began discussing the merger of the two organizations with George Meany, Green's successor as head of the AFL, the next year.

Most of the critical differences that once separated the two organizations had faded since the 1930s. The AFL had not only embraced industrial organizing, but also included industrial unions, such as the International Association of Machinists, that had become as large as the UAW or the Steelworkers.

The AFL had a number of advantages in those negotiations. It was, for one thing, twice as large as the CIO. The CIO was, for its part, once again facing internal rivalries that threatened to seriously weaken it.

Reuther was spurred toward merger by the threats from David J. McDonald, Murray's successor as President of the Steelworkers, who disliked Reuther intensely, insulted him publicly and flirted with disaffiliation from the CIO. While Reuther set out a number of conditions for merger with the AFL, such as constitutional provisions supporting industrial unionism, guarantees against racial discrimination, and internal procedures to clean up corrupt unions, his weak bargaining position forced him to compromise most of these demands. Although the unions that made up the CIO survived, and in some cases thrived, as members of the newly created AFL-CIO, the CIO as an organization was folded into the AFL-CIO's Industrial Union Department.

Now, the AFL-CIO is made up of 56 national and international labor unions with 12.5 million members.

== Geography ==
The CIO had a very particular geography in its formative years, one that set the new federation apart from the AFL. The member unions of the new CIO were very largely based in the heartland of American big industry- the states from New York and Pennsylvania in the east through the Great Lakes states of Ohio, Indiana, Illinois, and Michigan. These regions formed the industrial base for the three largest unions to emerge from the federation as well as its largest founding member. Of these, the UAW was most strongly established in the major auto plants of Michigan, followed by the smaller, independent plants of Ohio and Indiana. It would push outward to West Coast and the South during World War II as its membership ballooned to over a million members due to the conversion of auto plants to wartime production. UE found particular success in the Northeastern manufacturing corridor of Pennsylvania, Massachusetts, and New York. More than any other union in the CIO, its peak was defined by its largest individual locals; nearly a fifth of its total membership was concentrated in the Lynn and Schenectady GE plants, the Essington and Camden RCA plants, and the Westinghouse plant in East Pittsburgh. The SWOC/USW and the UMW shared a somewhat overlapping base even if their time together in the CIO was brief. Both amassed the majority of their membership in the mines and factories surrounding the Ohio and Monongahela Rivers and the industrial cities of Lake Erie.

While the majority of membership was indeed constituted by workers in the major industries of the East Coast and Midwest, the CIO also had strong representation on the West Coast thanks to the rapid expansion of the ILWU, International Woodworkers of America (IWA), Mine-Mill, and the United Cannery, Agricultural, Packing, and Allied Workers of America (UCAPAWA). Some established holdovers from the AFL, like the ITU, pulled members in their industry from across the entire country. Short-lived, but meaningful incursions were also made into the South during Operation Dixie. Though the campaign was a failure, unions like the ACWA, the ILGWU, and the UAW were able to maintain small footholds in the region.

== Affiliates ==
Union	Abbreviation	Founded	Left	Reason left	Membership (1938)	Membership (1953)
Aluminum Workers of America	AMA	1937	1944	Merged into USW	27,000	N/A
Amalgamated Association of Iron and Steel Workers	AA	1876	1942	Merged into USW	8,435	N/A
Amalgamated Clothing Workers of America	ACWA	1914	1955	Transferred to AFL-CIO	252,620	385,000
Amalgamated Lithographers of America	ALA	1916	1955	Transferred to AFL-CIO		26,579
American Communications Association	ACA	1931	1950	Expelled	13,220	N/A
American Newspaper Guild	ANG	1933	1955	Transferred to AFL-CIO	17,753	25,000
American Radio Association	ARA	1948	1955	Transferred to AFL-CIO	N/A	2,000
Barbers' and Beauty Culturists' Union of America	BBC	1939	1955	Transferred to AFL-CIO	N/A	5,000
Communications Workers of America	CWA	1947	1955	Transferred to AFL-CIO	N/A	300,000
Federation of Architects, Engineers, Chemists and Technicians	FAECT	1933	1946	Merged into UOPWA	7,525	N/A
Federation of Glass, Ceramic and Silica Sand Workers of America	FGCSSWA	1934	1955	Transferred to AFL-CIO	22,512	36,000
Food, Tobacco, Agricultural and Allied Workers' Union of America	FTA	1937	1950	Expelled	124,750	N/A
Industrial Union of Marine and Shipbuilding Workers of America	IUMSWA	1933	1955	Transferred to AFL-CIO	24,709	55,000
Inlandboatmen's Union of the Pacific	IBU	1918	1948	Disaffiliated	3,117	N/A
Insurance Workers of America	IWA	1953	1955	Transferred to AFL-CIO	N/A	N/A
International Fishermen and Allied Workers of America	IFAWA	1937	1950	Expelled	6,171	N/A
International Fur and Leather Workers' Union of the United States and Canada	IFLWU	1913	1950	Expelled	45,345	N/A
International Ladies Garment Workers Union	ILGWU	1900	1940	Transferred to AFL	250,000	N/A
International Longshoreman's and Warehousemen's Union	ILWU	1937	1950	Expelled	33,210	65,000
International Typographical Union	ITU	1852	1944	Transferred to AFL		94,000
International Union of Electrical, Radio and Machine Workers	IUE	1949	1955	Transferred to AFL-CIO	N/A	
International Union of Mine, Mill and Smelter Workers	IUMMSW	1893	1950	Expelled	55,210	N/A
International Union of United Brewery, Flour, Cereal, Soft Drink and Distillery Workers of America	IUB	1886	1955	Transferred to AFL-CIO		62,000
International Union, United Automobile, Aerospace, and Agricultural Implement Workers of America	UAW	1935	1955	Transferred to AFL-CIO	381,200	1,184,507
International Woodworkers of America	IWA	1937	1955	Transferred to AFL-CIO	101,612	117,251
Leather Workers' International Union	LWU	1955	1955	Transferred to AFL-CIO	N/A	N/A
National Association of Broadcast Engineers and Technicians	NABET	1934	1955	Transferred to AFL-CIO		
National Association of Die Casting Workers	NADCW	1934	1942	Merged into IUMMSW	4,750	N/A
National Leather Workers' Association	NLWA	1933	1940	Merged into IFLWU	15,218	N/A
National Marine Engineers' Benefit Association	MEBA	1875	1955	Transferred to AFL-CIO	6,350	13,500
National Maritime Union of America	NMU	1937	1955	Transferred to AFL-CIO	67,512	43,000
National Union of Marine Cooks and Stewards	NUMCS		1950	Expelled	8,212	7,000
Oil Workers' International Union	OCAW	1917	1955	Transferred to AFL-CIO	98,900	80,000
Playthings, Jewelry and Novelty Workers' International Union	PJNWIU	1938	1954	Merged into RWDSU		30,000
Retail, Wholesale and Department Store Union	RWDSU	1937	1955	Transferred to AFL-CIO	52,617	97,000
State, County, and Municipal Workers of America	SCMWA	1937	1946	Merged into UPWA	52,111	N/A
Textile Workers' Union of America	TWUA	1939	1955	Transferred to AFL-CIO	N/A	361,970
Transport Workers' Union of America	TWU	1934	1955	Transferred to AFL-CIO	90,125	65,000
United Department Store Workers of America		1951	1955	Merged into RWDSU	N/A	
United Electrical, Radio and Machine Workers of America	UE	1936	1949	Expelled	157,891	N/A
United Farm Equipment and Metal Workers of America	FE	1942	1949	Merged into UE	N/A	N/A
United Federal Workers of America	UFWA	1937	1946	Merged into UPWA	15,120	N/A
United Furniture Workers of America	UFWA	1937	1955	Transferred to AFL-CIO	35,775	50,000
United Gas, Coke and Chemical Workers of America	UGCCWA	1942	1955	Merged into OCAW	N/A	70,000
United Hatters, Cap and Millinery Workers International Union	UHCMW	1934	?	Transferred to AFL	32,000	
United Mine Workers of America	UMWA	1890	1942	Disaffiliated	612,113	N/A
United Office and Professional Workers of America	UOPWA	1937	1950	Expelled	46,575	N/A
United Optical and Instrument Workers of America		1949	1954	Dissolved	N/A	
United Packinghouse Workers of America	UPWA	1943	1955	Transferred to AFL-CIO	N/A	132,000
United Paperworkers of America	UPA	1946	1955	Transferred to the AFL-CIO	N/A	50,000
United Public Workers of America	UPWA	1946	1950	Expelled	N/A	N/A
United Railroad Workers of America		1951	1954	Merged into TWU	N/A	
United Rubber, Cork, Linoleum and Plastic Workers of America	URW	1935	1955	Transferred to AFL-CIO	63,717	190,000
United Shoe Workers of America	USWA	1909	1955	Transferred to AFL-CIO	52,127	60,000
United Steelworkers of America	USW	1942	1955	Transferred to AFL-CIO	N/A	1,190,000
United Stone and Allied Products Workers of America	USAPWA	1903	1955	Transferred to AFL-CIO	10,110	16,000
United Transport Service Employees of America	UTSEA	1937	1955	Transferred to AFL-CIO		
Utility Workers' Union of America	UWUA	1940	1955	Transferred to AFL-CIO		78,500

== Leadership ==
=== Presidents ===
1935: John L. Lewis
1940: Philip Murray
1952: Walter Reuther

=== Secretary-Treasurers ===
1935: Charles P. Howard
1938: James B. Carey

=== Executive Vice Presidents ===
1951: Allan Haywood
1953: John V. Riffe

== See also ==
- Communists in the United States Labor Movement (1919–37)
- Communists in the United States Labor Movement (1937–1950)
- Henry O. Mayfield

== Web sites ==
- Work'n'Progress: Stories of Southern Labor. A project of the Southern Labor Archives, Department of Special Collections, The University Library, Georgia State University.

== Archives ==
- In 2013, the AFL-CIO named the University of Maryland Libraries as their official repository, succeeding the closed National Labor College. The archival and library holdings, an estimated 40 million documents, were transferred in 2013, dating from the establishment of the AFL (1881), and offer almost complete records from the founding of the AFL-CIO (1955). The George Meany Memorial AFL-CIO Archive contains material that will help researchers better understand pivotal social movements in this country, including those to gain rights for women, children and minorities.
- Southern Labor Archives. Department of Special Collections, The University Library, Georgia State University. (Official repository for hundreds of local and regional union offices, as well as the national offices of IAMAW, NFFE, UGWA, UFWA, PATCO, UTWA, and the Georgia State AFL-CIO.) Online guide retrieved May 18, 2012.
- Martin, Katherine F., ed. Operation Dixie: The CIO Organizing Committee Papers, 1946-1953. Media: 75 reels of 35mm microfilm. Online guide to the microfilm edition retrieved April 27, 2005.
- The Washington State CIO Records. 1950–1957. 6 cubic feet. At the Labor Archives of Washington, University of Washington Special Collections.
