= George Addes =

Founder of the United Automobile Workers of America

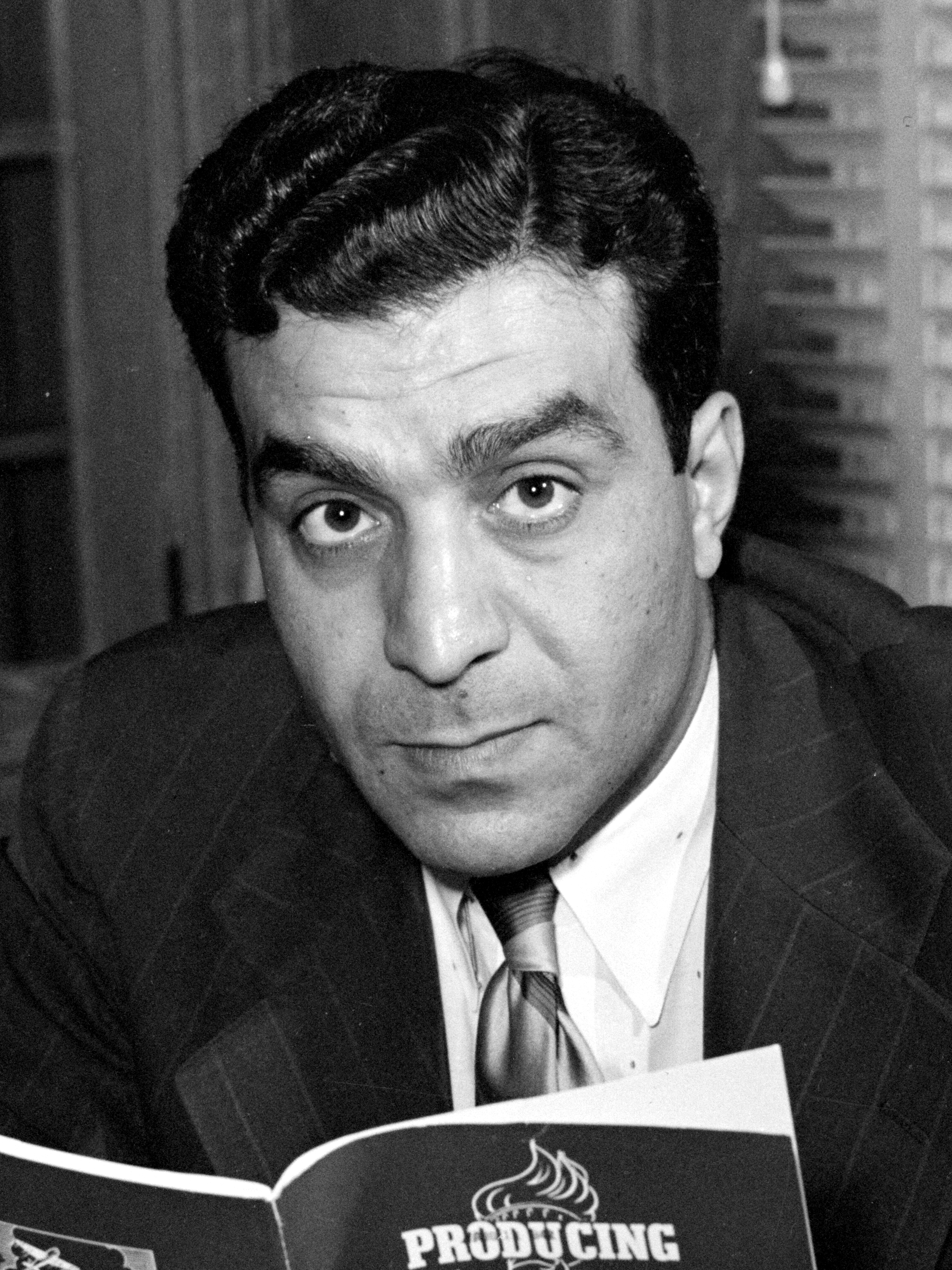
- Addes in 1942

2nd Secretary-Treasurer of the United Auto Workers
- In office April 27, 1936 – November 11, 1947
- President: Homer Martin; R. J. Thomas; Walter Reuther
- Preceded by: Ed Hall
- Succeeded by: Emil Mazey

Personal details
- Born: George F. Addes; August 26, 1911 La Crosse, Wisconsin, US
- Died: June 19, 1990 (aged 78) Grosse Pointe, Michigan, US
- Occupation: Politician, activist, trade unionist

George F. Addes (August 26, 1911 – June 19, 1990) was a founder of the United Automobile Workers of America (UAW) union and its secretary-treasurer from 1936 until 1947. Along with R. J. Thomas and Richard Frankensteen, he was a leader of the pro-Communist left-wing faction of the UAW.

== Background ==
George F. Addes was born on August 26, 1911, in La Crosse, Wisconsin, came from Lebanese ancestry, and grew up in Toledo, Ohio.

== Career ==
At age 17, Addes went to work at the Willys Overland plant in Toledo.

Addes and Richard Frankensteen led a major faction of the UAW, supporting piecework and incentive pay in auto plants. The other faction, led by Walter Reuther, accused them both of being communists. Addes participated in the Battle of the Overpass. In 1947, he lost his executive position to Emil Mazey.

After leaving the UAW, Addes joined Ford Motor Company, from which he retired in 1975.

== Personal life and death ==
Addes married Gloria Saba; they had three children.

George F. Addes died age 79 on June 19, 1990, at the Bon Secours Hospital in Grosse Pointe, Michigan.

== See also ==
- Battle of the Overpass
- Communists in the U.S. Labor Movement (1919-1937)

Trade union offices
Preceded by Ed Hall	Secretary-Treasurer of the United Auto Workers; 1936–1947	Succeeded by Emil Mazey
