= 1942 Pulitzer Prize =

Awards for journalism and related fields

The following are the Pulitzer Prizes for 1942.

== Journalism awards ==
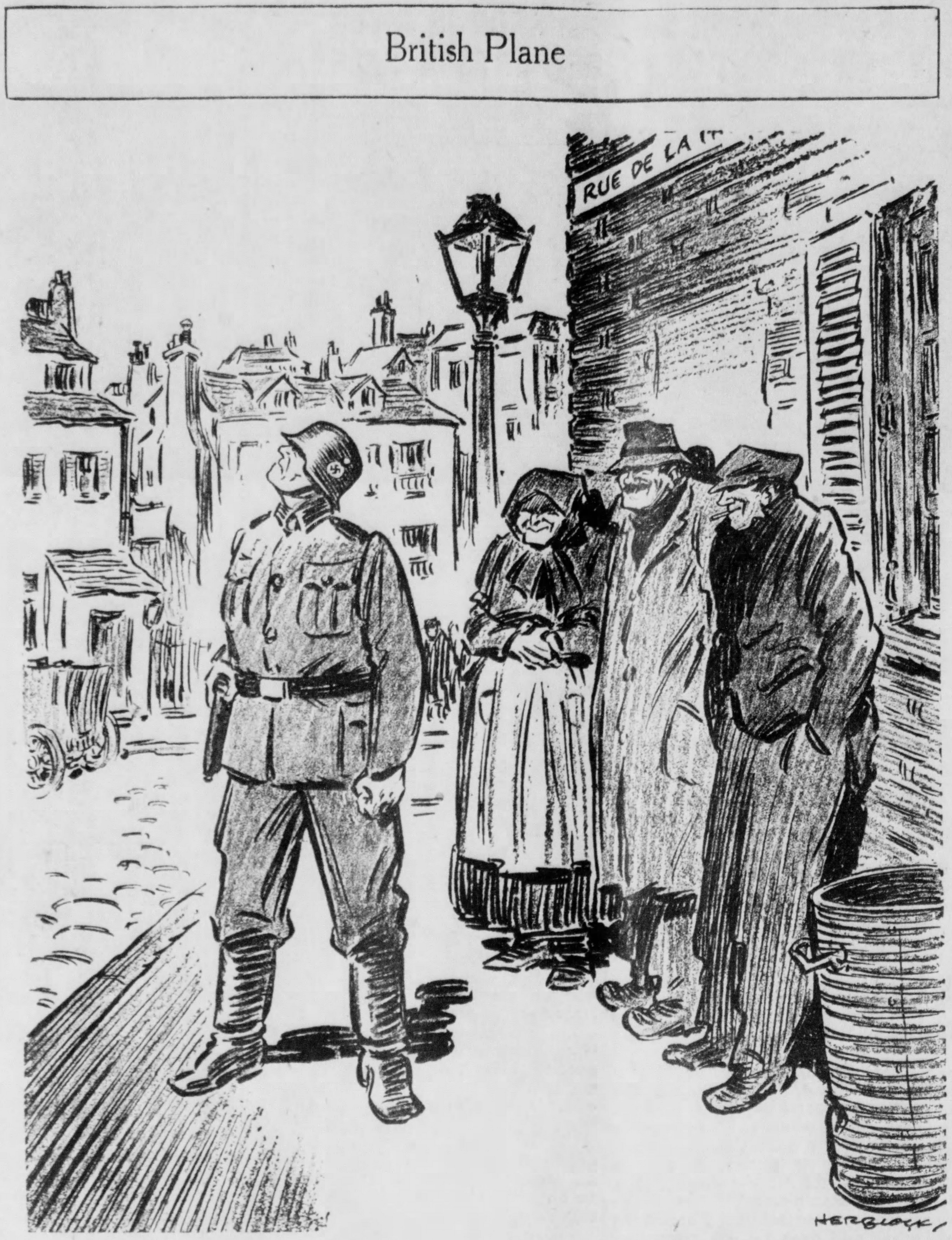
"British Plane", the prize-winning editorial cartoon

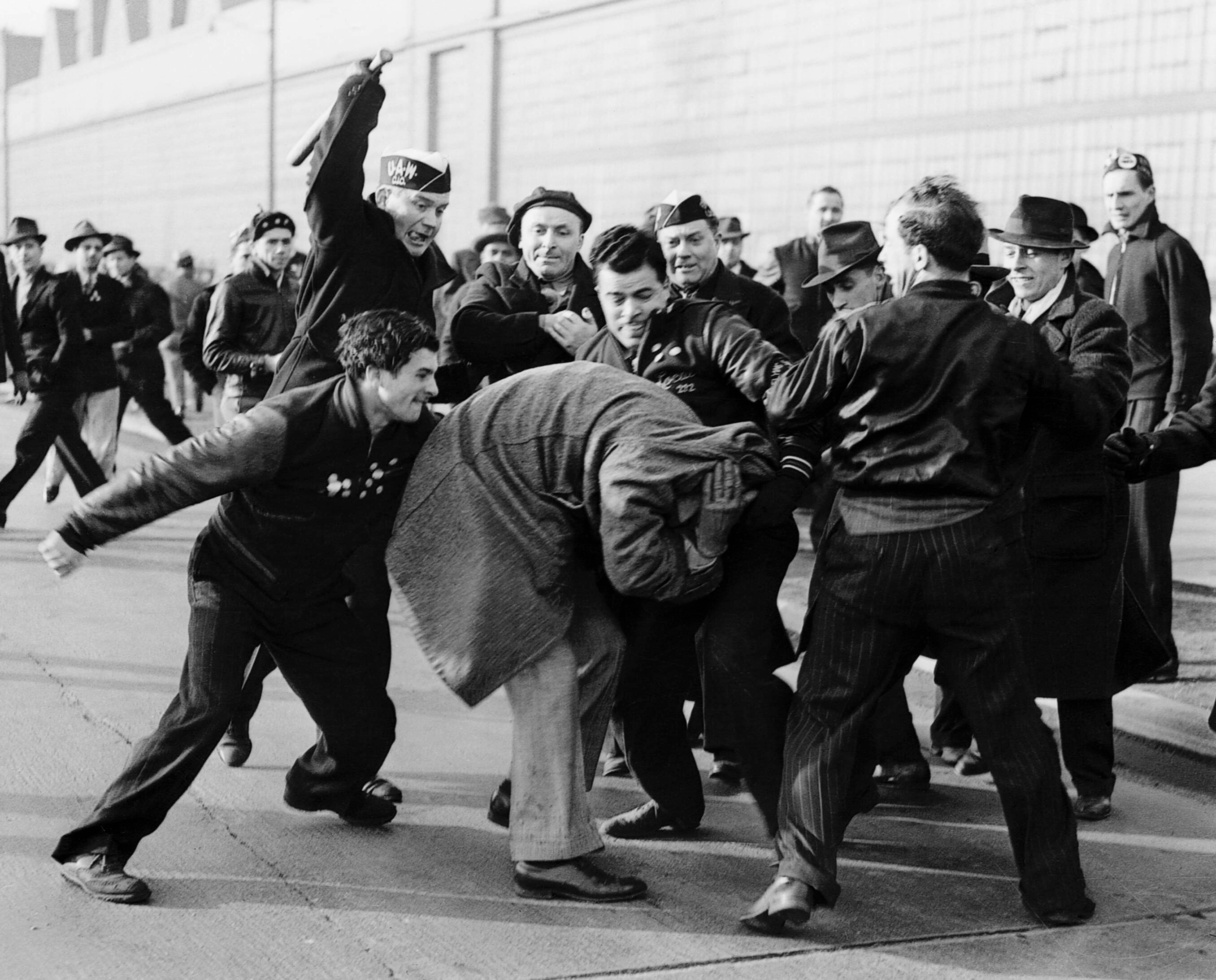
"Ford Strikers Riot", the prize-winning photograph

- Public Service:
  - Los Angeles Times for its successful campaign which resulted in the clarification and confirmation for all American newspapers of the right of free press as guaranteed under the Constitution.
- Reporting:
  - Stanton Delaplane of the San Francisco Chronicle for his articles on the movement of several California and Oregon counties to secede to form the State of Jefferson, a forty ninth state.
- Correspondence:
  - Carlos P. Romulo of the Philippines Herald for his observations and forecasts of Far Eastern developments during a tour of the trouble centers from Hong Kong to Batavia.
- Telegraphic Reporting (National):
  - Louis Stark of The New York Times for his distinguished reporting of important labor stories during the year.
- Telegraphic Reporting (International):
  - Laurence Edmund Allen of the Associated Press for his stories of the activities of the British Mediterranean Fleet, written as an accredited correspondent attached to the fleet.
- Editorial Writing:
  - Geoffrey Parsons of the New York Herald Tribune for his distinguished editorial writing during the year.
- Editorial Cartooning:
  - Herbert Lawrence Block (Herblock) of the Newspaper Enterprise Association for "British Plane".
- Photography:
  - Milton Brooks of The Detroit News for his photo entitled, "Ford Strikers Riot".

== Letters and Drama Awards ==
- Novel:
  - In This Our Life by Ellen Glasgow (Harcourt).
- Drama:
  - No award given.
- History:
  - Reveille in Washington, 1860-1865 by Margaret Leech (Harper).
- Biography or Autobiography:
  - Crusader in Crinoline by Forrest Wilson (Lippincott).
- Poetry:
  - The Dust Which Is God by William Rose Benet (Dodd, Mead).
