= Richard Frankensteen =

American labor leader (1907–1977)

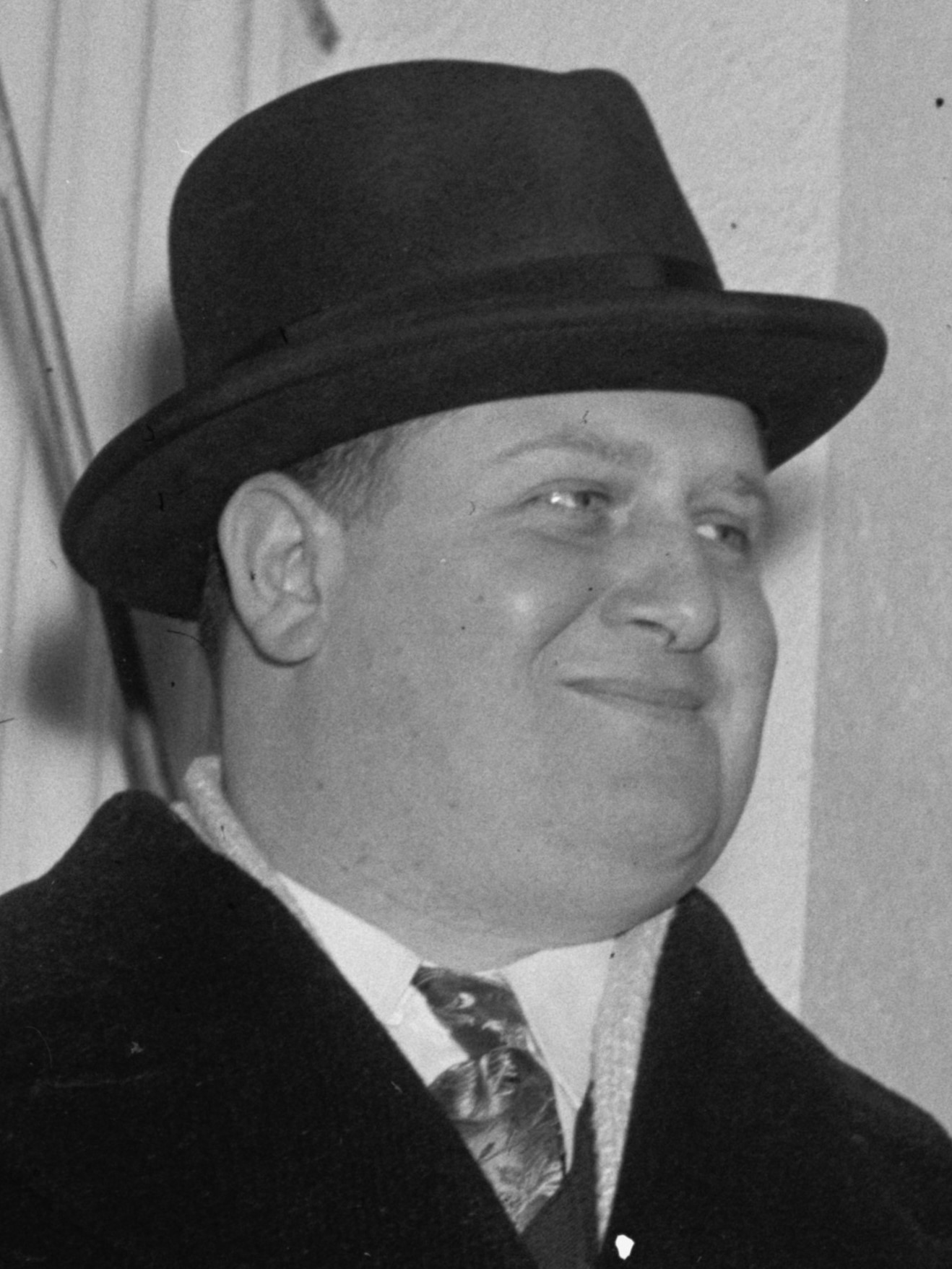
- Frankensteen in 1938

Vice President of the United Automobile Workers
- In office August 28, 1937 – November 11, 1947

Personal details
- Born: Richard Truman Frankensteen; March 6, 1907 Detroit, Michigan, U.S.
- Died: April 8, 1977 (aged 70) Highland Park, Michigan, U.S.
- Spouse: Grace Callahan
- Children: Carol; Marilyn; Rick
- Education: University of Dayton; University of Detroit
- Occupation: Labor leader
- Known for: Labor movement, The Battle of the Overpass

Richard Frankensteen (March 6, 1907 – April 8, 1977) was an American labor union leader and politician who served as the first president of the "Automotive Industrial Workers Association" which merged into the United Auto Workers (UAW). He was elected vice president of the UAW, where he played a major role until he was ousted in 1947 for his alleged communist ties. In actuality, Frankensteen was a leader of the left wing coalition led by R. J. Thomas and George Addes. It opposed to Walter Reuther, who defeated them in 1947.

Frankensteen attended Central High School, named to the all-city and all-state high school football teams and earned All-American honors in his senior year at University of Dayton.

Beginning at age 15, he worked summers at the Dodge Brothers' plant for more than six years. After an intended career of teaching and high school football coaching in Ohio was crushed by the Great Depression, he returned home to Detroit to work full-time with Dodge, and studied law at night at the University of Detroit. He rose to the bargaining council of the company union at the Dodge plant, and later became leader of the movement that reorganized it into an independent union.

He was defeated for mayor of Detroit in 1945. He was aligned with UAW faction that was finally defeated by Walter Reuther. He left union activity and became a corporate consultant, but refused to work for anti-union clients.

Frankensteen married Grace Callahan and they had three children: Carol Lee Vitale, Marilyn St. Cyr Fekety, and Richard T. Frankensteen, Jr. (Rick).

== See also ==
- The Battle of the Overpass

== Sources ==
- Barnard, John (2004). American Vanguard: A History of the United Auto Workers, 1935–1970.
- Doody, Colleen (2017). Detroit's Cold War: The Origins of Postwar Conservatism. ISBN 0-252-08310-5.
- Fink, Gary M. (1974). Biographical Dictionary of American Labor Leaders. Greenwood Press. p. 112.
- Goode, Bill (1994). Infighting in the UAW: The 1946 Election and the Ascendancy of Walter Reuther. Greenwood Press. ISBN 978-0-313-28904-0.
- Halpern, Martin (1988). UAW Politics in the Cold War Era. SUNY Press.
- Kraus, Henry (1993). Heroes of Unwritten Story: The UAW, 1934–1939. University of Illinois Press.
- Lichtenstein, Nelson (1995). Walter Reuther: The Most Dangerous Man in Detroit. ISBN 978-0-252-06626-9. – a major scholarly biography
