= Dearborn Massacre =

The term Dearborn Massacre refers to two historical events:

- The Fort Dearborn massacre in 1812
- The shooting of protesters at the Ford Hunger March in 1932
