= Homer Martin (labor leader) =

American labor leader (1901–1968)

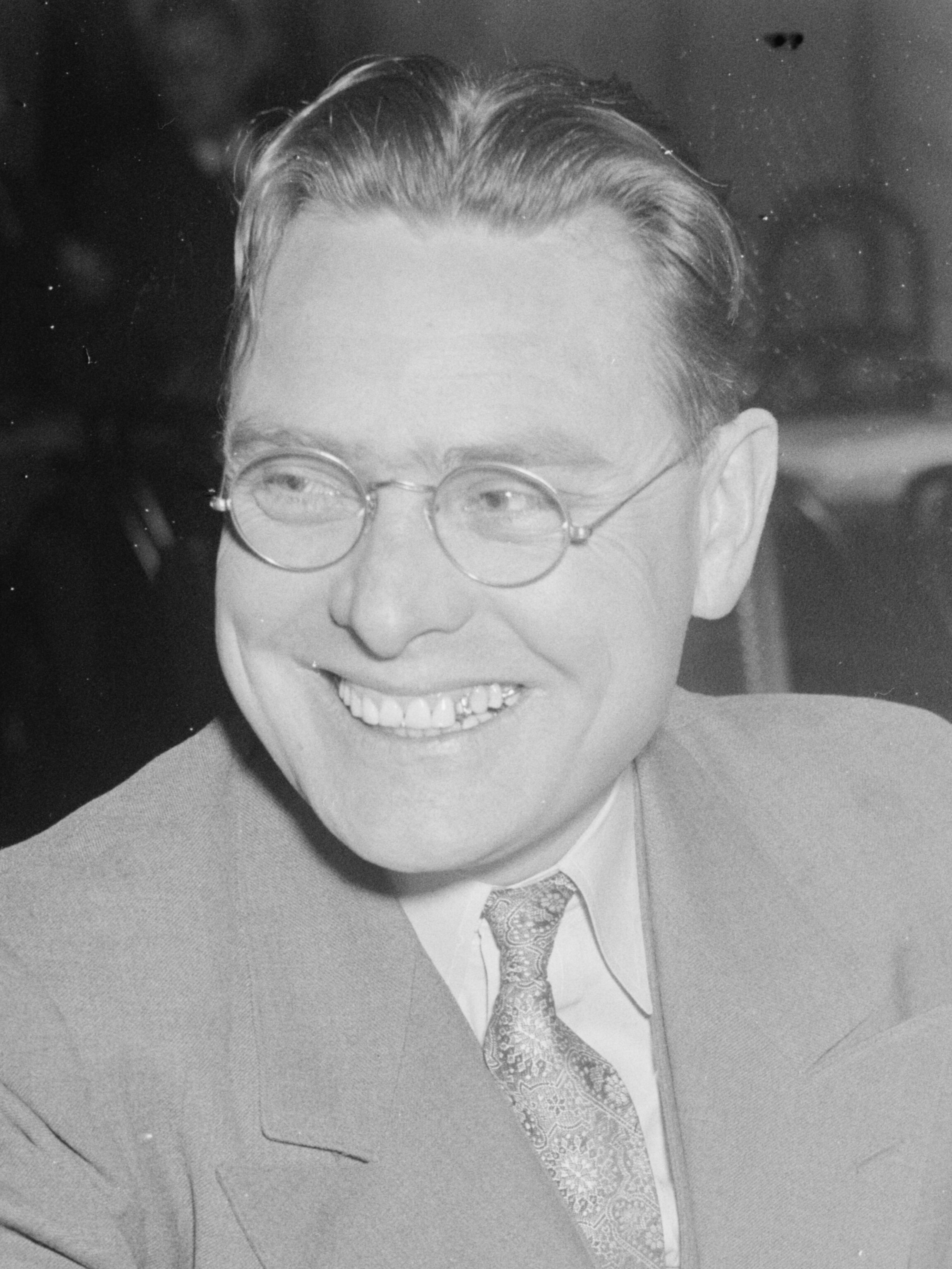
- Martin in 1938

2nd President of the United Auto Workers
- In office April 27, 1936 – January 20, 1939
- Preceded by: Francis J. Dillon
- Succeeded by: R. J. Thomas

Personal details
- Born: September 16, 1901 Illinois, U.S.
- Died: January 22, 1968 (aged 66) Los Angeles, California, U.S.
- Education: William Jewell College

Homer Martin (September 16, 1901 – January 22, 1968) was an American trade unionist, socialist, and the second president of the United Auto Workers (UAW).

After high school he attended Hewing College and received his AB from William Jewell College. Martin then attended the Kansas City Baptist Theological Seminary for two years.

After serving in Baptist churches in Goreville, Illinois and Kansas City, Missouri, Martin went to work in the auto plants of Kansas City. He soon became active in the union movement and was appointed a Vice-President of the UAW-AFL in 1935. In 1936 he was elected President of what came to be the UAW-CIO. After he accused four union vice-presidents of "conspiracy with communists to wreck union", he was ousted and replaced by R. J. Thomas in 1938 who had been leader of the Chrysler sit-down strike in March the previous year.

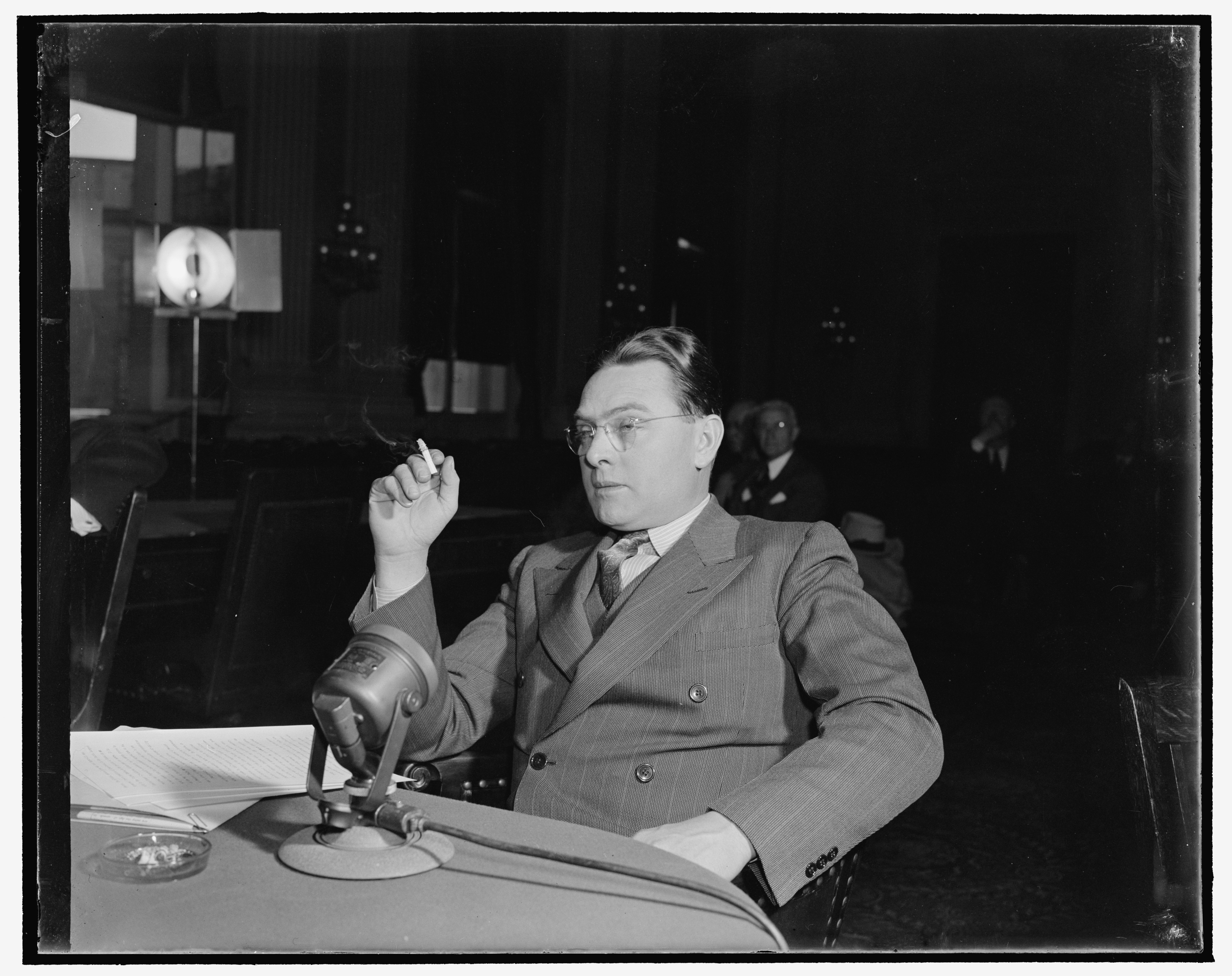
Homer Martin testifying to the House Un-American Activities Committee (December 1, 1938)

In 1938, after Fred Beal, returned from the Soviet Union was deserted by the Communist-controlled International Labour Defense because of the witness he bore to the Holodomor, Martin joined a non-partisan committee for his defense against recommittal in North Carolina where in 1929 the union organiser had been convicted in a conspiracy trial. With him on the committee were Thomas Ryun Amlie, Jerry Voorhis, Emily Greene Balch, Dorothy Kenyon and Sara Bard Field. The Committee reported hostile pressure from members of the ILD and anonymous threats.

In what was seen as "a body blow to company-dominated unionism in the auto" industry, in May 1940 Martin was removed by two main groups in the union who subsequently split apart: the Communists and their allies headed by UAW co-founder George Addes, and the Socialists and their allies, headed by Walter Reuther.

In June 1941 he testified before the House Un-American Activities Committee (HUAC) that Fascists, assisted by the Italian consul, were interfering in local politics in Detroit. He testified again before the HUAC on the presence and activities of Communists in both national labor federations, the AFL and CIO.

Martin died in Los Angeles 1968.

== Succession ==
Trade union offices
Preceded by Francis Dillon	President of the United Auto Workers; 1936–1938	Succeeded by R.J. Thomas
Preceded by Union founded	President of the International Union, Allied Industrial Workers of America; 1938–1940	Succeeded by Irving Carey
