= Forrest Wilson =

American journalist (1883–1942)

Robert Forrest Wilson
- Born: January 20, 1883; Warren, Ohio, U.S.
- Died: May 9, 1942 (aged 59); Weston, Connecticut, U.S.
- Occupations: Author; Journalist
- Parent(s): James Forrest, and Harriet Rose (Larned) Wilson
- Awards: 1942 Pulitzer Prize

Robert Forrest Wilson (January 20, 1883 in Warren, Ohio – May 9, 1942 in Weston, Connecticut) was an American author and journalist. He won the 1942 Pulitzer Prize for his biography, Crusader in Crinoline: The Life of Harriet Beecher Stowe.

Wilson was born in Warren, Ohio, to parents James Forrest and Harriet Rose (Larned) Wilson. He studied the arts at the California School of Fine Arts in 1939 and received his Ph.D. at Union Graduate School. He also studied the arts in Paris and at Pratt Institute in New York.

Early in his career, he worked as reporter, before enlisting in the U.S.Army, where he served as a captain, worked as a researcher and later served as an Assistant Secretary of War. He co-authored and authored several books and magazine articles.

== Career ==
Wilson reported for Scripps Newspapers from 1910 to 1916, in Washington D.C. Later, during the First World War he served as a captain with the US Army Chemical Warfare Service and later (1923–1927) as Assistant Secretary of War charged with gathering historical data on the conflict, much of which formed the basis of a series of six co-authored works about mobilization: How America Went to War, published in 1921. (See selected works below)

After the war, like tens of thousands of Americans, Wilson moved to Paris and lived there for some years, a period which he details in his book, Paris On Parade. He worked as a European correspondent for McCall's, (1923–1927) writing about life in Paris. Wilson wrote an article about a bookshop in Paris, "Shakespeare and Company," in 1925, titled, "Paris for Young Art," published by The Bookman.

Two articles on fashion, "The House of Louisboulanger," and "The House of Camille Roger," appeared in the 1926 and 1927 issues of Vogue (magazine).

Wilson wrote the words and music for the song, "Go and teach the Kaiser how to sing the Marseillaise, then come home to me," published in 1918.

== Selected works ==
- How America Went to War: an account from official sources of the nation's war activities 1917–1920, co-author with Benedict (Crowell Assistant Secretary of War), Yale University Press, 1921.
- The Road to France: the transportation of troops and military supplies 1917–1918, co-author with Benedict Crowell (Assistant Secretary of War), Yale University Press, 1921.
- Our Nation's Manufacture of Munitions for a World Arms: 1917–1918, co-author with Benedict Crowell (Assistant Secretary of War), Yale University Press, 1921.
- Demobilization: our industrial and military demobilization after the armistice, 1918–1920, co-author with Benedict Cowell (Assistant Secretary of War), Yale University Press, New Haven, 1921.
- The Giant Hand: Our Mobilization and Control of Industry and Natural Resources 1917–1918, co-author with Benedict Crowell (Assistant Secretary of War), Yale University Press, New Haven, 1921.
- The Living Pageant of the Nile, Bobbs Merrill, 1924.
- Paris on Parade, co-author with A.G. Warshawsky, Bobbs Merrill, Indianapolis, 1925.
- Rich Brat: a novel of Paris, Bobbs-Merrill Company, 1929.
- How to Wine and Dine in Paris (Chapters from "Paris on Parade"), Bobbs-Merrill Company, 1930.
- Crusader in Crinoline: The Life of Harriet Beecher Stowe, J.B. Lippincott Company, 1941.
