= Harry Bennett =

Internal security employee of Ford Motor Company

Harry Herbert Bennett (January 17, 1892 – January 4, 1979), was a boxer, naval sailor, and businessman. From 1915 through 1945, he worked for Ford Motor Company and was best known as the head of Ford's "service department", the company's internal security agency. While working for Henry Ford, Bennett's union-busting tactics made him an enemy of the United Auto Workers (UAW) trade union. He gained infamy for his involvement in activities such as in the Battle of the Overpass, a 1937 incident where UAW members protesting for higher wages were assaulted by Ford security guards. In one incident, he opened fire on a protesting crowd with a machine gun, killing a 16-year-old boy.

He had various residences in Michigan, including the Great Lakes Landmark and Ford Motor Company; built Pagodahouse, the Asian-themed boathouse on Grosse Ile; Bennett's Lodge near Farwell, a log cabin-style house in East Tawas; and Bennett's Castle, an estate located on the Huron River in Ypsilanti, where he kept pet lions and tigers. After being fired by Henry Ford II in 1945, Bennett left Michigan to live in California. On January 4, 1979, Bennett died in Los Gatos, California, of undisclosed causes.

== Biography ==
Harry Bennett was born in 1892 in Ann Arbor, Michigan. He went to common schools. As a youth, Bennett started competing in boxing and won some city bouts. He served in the U.S. Navy during World War I.

== Career ==
In the early days of Ford Motor Company, a security department operated under the name of the Ford Service Department. Its purpose was to try to control the growing labor unrest and suppress the emerging labor unions. Ford had instituted a policy called "speed up", by which the speed of the assembly lines was increased slightly every week, and employees were feeling the strain. The labor issues sometimes led to violent clashes between Ford's management, the police, and some workers. Henry Ford needed someone able to handle rough situations as head of his Service Department.

=== Ford Service Department ===
Harry Bennett served as the head of the Ford Motor Company Service Department for over two decades, beginning in 1921. Bennett was 5 feet 6 inches (1.68 m) and in great physical shape due to his years of boxing and service in the Navy. Legend traces Bennett's relationship to Ford Motor Company to a 1916 street brawl in New York City. At the time, Bennett, 24, was a sailor and was just off his ship. He was saved from being thrown into jail by an acquaintance of Henry Ford, Bernie Ghers, who happened to witness the fight while on his way to a meeting with Ford. Ghers, a Hearst newspaper columnist who had credibility with the police, convinced them that Bennett was not at fault, so they released Bennett without charges. On the spur of the moment, Ghers decided to take Bennett along with him to see Ford. At the meeting, Ford was more interested in Bennett's prowess in the street fight than the business at hand, and he offered Bennett a security job at the Rouge plant. Bennett's interview for the job was reported to be short. He was asked only one question by Ford as to his capabilities. "Can you shoot?" asked Henry. He could.

Bennett was known for talking and acting tough around the Ford plants. For target practice, Bennett would fire BB's from an air pistol at a small target mechanism on a filing cabinet in his basement office at the Rouge. Visitors and co-workers were puzzled by the muffled sounds of pellets striking the target. Bennett kept lions as pets at his Ann Arbor estate. He startled fellow executives by bringing the "big cats" to his office and painting images of them.

"Harry Bennett used to sit at his desk, with his feet up on the desk, and a target at the other end of the room and fire a 45 target practice in his office and if someone was invited in to have a meeting with him they better make certain that his presence was properly announced or they may have intercepted one of those."

Bennett soon recruited a collection of football players, boxers, wrestlers, and Detroit river gang members as Service Department employees. He knew nothing about making cars, but he did not need to. Bennett's close relationship with Henry Ford and his ability to get things done made him a success. All Henry had to do was ask, "Can you take care of that, Harry?" and it was done.

Bennett was so loyal to Henry Ford that when a journalist asked Bennett during an interview, "If Henry Ford asked you to black out the sky tomorrow, what would you do?" Bennett thought for a moment and said, "I might have a little trouble arranging that one but you'd see 100,000 workers coming through the plant gates with dark glasses on tomorrow."

In the mid-1920s, Bennett often drove to Ford's Fair Lane mansion to ask his boss if there was anything he could do for him. By the time the Model A production was in full swing in 1928–29, the morning meetings had become a habit. For the better part of 20 years, Bennett spent his days at Henry Ford's side.

Bennett led Ford's opposition to the Ford Hunger March of unemployed workers on March 7, 1932. Dearborn police and Ford service department men including Bennett opened fire on the protesters as they advanced toward the Ford River Rouge complex. Four marchers were shot to death, and Bennett himself was hospitalized after being hit by a rock.

By the beginning of 1938 Bennett was receiving phoned and mailed threats. His daughter Gertrude abruptly disappeared; the most recent prior threat had been "particularly nasty in its implications". A search run by federal agents was launched and abandoned once it was discovered she had eloped to Florida.

Upon the 1943 death of company president Edsel Ford, the founder's overshadowed son, Bennett was Henry Ford's choice to succeed Edsel. However, Edsel Ford's widow blamed Bennett for her husband's early death and effectively vetoed the appointment. Instead, Henry Ford appointed Bennett to the Ford Motor Company board of directors. After some attempted shenanigans with Henry Ford's will which would have given Bennett control over the company, the Ford women stepped in and demanded Bennett's ouster. In September 1945, Henry Ford II was summoned to Ford's estate and informed that he would be the new president of Ford Motor Company. As his first act, Henry Ford II, then 28, had John Bugas hand Bennett his walking papers (after which Bennett and Bugas drew pistols on each other). Bennett told the younger Ford, "You're taking over a billion-dollar company that you haven't contributed a thing to." That afternoon, on September 21, 1945, Bennett departed, ending his 30-year career with the Ford Motor Company.

The ruthless Bennett era was finally over. Afterward, Henry Ford II went to Ford to tell him of his first executive decision: "I went to him (Henry Ford) with my guard up. I was sure he was going to blow my head off." Ford quite nonchalantly said, "Well, now Harry is back on the streets where he started."

== Residences ==
=== Bennett's Pagoda Boathouse ===
The Ford Pagoda House / Harry Bennett Boathouse on Grosse Ile, Michigan is probably the best known of Bennett's residences and has been a Great Lakes landmark since its construction in the 1930s. Curious boaters, motorists and tour buses stop and admire the architecture and its massive size, literally rising out of the water. It was designed by an architect named Angelotti and built by the Ford Motor Company. Some history: When it became too dangerous for Henry Ford's "right-hand man" Harry Bennett to live in Dearborn, the Fords moved Bennett and his family to this Island Residence. So cautious was Bennett that he was known to forego leaving by the front door, instead taking one of the yachts, or the tunnel under West River Rd to a car waiting near the stables to get him to the Rouge plant in Dearborn. The upper level with its arched bridge, tile roof and wraparound decks features three bedroom suites, bathrooms and kitchen done in Venetian glass, laundry, second kitchen and cedar closets. In the servants' hallway, Ford artists executed "cut-plaster" and faux-finish walls, gold leaf dragons, lotus, fish and a mahogany-paneled library and fireplace with secret panels. The lower level is surrounded by a half acre of parking and features a hidden circular stairway down to indoor 60’ & 80’ boat wells, servants' quarters and a wine cellar with mahogany bar, which leads to the tunnel under West River Road.

=== Bennett's lodge ===
Bennett had a lodge built for him in Freeman Township, Michigan, on Lost Lake. The house is constructed of brick and concrete block with concrete siding fashioned to resemble a log cabin. It had wooden floors and wall paneling, a 128-foot (39 m) long porch, and a stone fireplace. Chairs and sofas for the house were custom made by the finest craftsmen and upholstered using the highest grade of leather that Ford acquired for use in their most luxurious automobiles of the era.

The swimming pool beside the house provided more than the usual entertainment to Bennett and his guests: The pool was constructed with a viewing room (complete with wet bar) adjacent to the pool. A glass window looked into the pool under water, so Harry and company could enjoy watching their female guests swim.

Since Bennett was always worried about being under attack, he included many security features in the lodge. The lodge was surrounded by a moat full of pointed posts. The bridge over the moat was kept loaded with dynamite.

The lodge has many custom features. Hidden behind a hinged bookcase in the study is a secret passageway which leads to the dock. Every step of the staircase in the passageway is a different height from the others to make tripping more likely. Bennett would practice running down the steps to memorize their spacing in order to give him an advantage if pursued. One hidden room had access to a central point in the ventilation system, where conversations from multiple rooms could be clearly overheard.

The roof of the building featured a guard station parapet at one end, complete with a fireplace to keep Bennett's men warm while on 24-hour armed watch when Bennett was at the lodge in colder months. Bennett had a private airfield with an airplane at the other end of Lost Lake. In the event of an attack, Bennett could take the secret passageway, emerge by the dock, take a boat across the lake, and escape by airplane. An attack never came.

The lodge and property were purchased in 1964 by the Boy Scouts of America, Clinton Valley Council. The property was developed for the Lost Lake Scout Reservation. The lodge was abandoned after the reservation was closed. Much of the furniture remains, but the pool has fallen into disrepair. Trees have been planted on the airfield.

=== Bennett's hideouts ===
Harry Bennett had a similar outpost on the north side of Geddes Road west of Prospect Road about 3,000 feet (910 m) from his estate near Ypsilanti. It was a concrete cabin constructed to resemble a log cabin. A hidden door disguised as a book shelf rotated to reveal access to an upper level secure space designed to be a lookout. This entry was behind the fireplace and led to a place with gun ports for defense. Near this cabin was an underground bunker, including a separate building with a Ford flathead V8 engine acting as a generator to make the property self-sustaining. The bunker was similar to the ones at Ford's Fair Lane estate. The compound also was a sugar bush that produced maple syrup. The property included a curbed circular drive. The barn on Geddes road had a cornerstone with "Harry Bennett" inscribed.

Bennett had a second hideout for himself, his family, his henchmen, and his visiting boss Henry Ford, consisting of a group of buildings, a compound with 14 bedrooms, a 40 foot indoor pool, indoor sauna, and a barbeque pit over 60 acres on a hill overlooking the Sky Valley desert 15 minutes from Palm Springs, California. The property came equipped with its own well, capable of producing 100 gallons a minute of hot fresh water.

== Later life and death ==
After burning his Ford Motor Company records in his basement office after Henry Ford II fired him there, Bennett retired to an 800-acre estate and wilderness area he owned near Desert Springs, California. His last public appearance came when he was called to testify in the Kefauver Senate Crime Investigation Committee Hearings in 1951, in the same year he published his memoirs on his time at Ford. He then retreated into private life in obscurity out of the spotlight, enjoying good health until he was 80.

The last six years of his life were spent in declining health. In 1973, Bennett suffered a major stroke. In 1975, he entered the Beverly Manor Nursing Home in Los Gatos, California, where on January 4, 1979, he died. His death went unreported for a week. The cause of death was not released to the public at that time.

== Memoir ==
- Bennett, Harry (1951). We Never Called Him Henry. New York: Gold Medal Books. ASIN B000I955G2. LCCN 51036122.
