= Louis Stark =

Journalist

- Born: May 1, 1888; Tibolddaróc, Hungary
- Died: May 17, 1954 (aged 66)
- Occupation: Journalist
- Spouse: Jennie S. House (m. 1916–1954)
- Children: Arthur Stark
- Writing career
- Subjects: Industrial relations, News reporting
- Notable awards: Pulitzer Prize for Telegraphic Reporting; 1942

Louis Stark (May 1, 1888 – May 17, 1954) was an American journalist. He spent most of his career working as an economic reporter for The New York Times. He won a Pulitzer Prize in 1942.

He is considered "a pioneer in the field of labor reporting." Harry S. Truman called him the "dean of all reporters on the labor scene."

== Early life and education ==
Stark was born on May 1, 1888, in Tibolddaróc, Hungary. He was the son of Adolph Stark and Rose (Kohn) Stark, and moved with them to the United States when he was two years old. The family settled in New York, where he attended public schools, DeWitt Clinton High School, and the New York Training School for Teachers.

== Career ==
In 1909, Stark taught for six months at Public School 75 in New York. He then worked as a book agent for a New York publisher. From 1909 to 1913, he was employed in publishing and advertising. In 1911, he held a job in the advertising department of The New York Times, then "began to do occasional assignments" for Arthur Greaves, then that newspaper's city editor, who helped Stark find a job with the New York City News Association. After working as a general assignment reporter for the City News from 1913 to 1917, Stark went over to the Evening Sun in 1917, and to the Times later that same year. From 1917 to 1922, he was a staff member at the Times.

He became a labor specialist in 1924 at the suggestion of Carr V. Van Anda, then managing editor of the Times. From then until 1951, he reported on business, economic affairs, and labor news for The New York Times, based in that newspaper's Washington bureau. During his first two days in Washington he "came up with two important exclusives," including the founding of the National Recovery Administration. "He covered all topics that have a connection to employment and the workforce," notes one source, "including strikes, international conventions of labor organizations, and the organization of labor, as well as national legislation and its impact on labor. He had a reputation for his 'accuracy and impartiality.'"

In a November 1935 article, "Cars and the Men," Stark reported on automobile workers in Detroit who had lost their jobs owing to increased mechanization. He reported on the 1936 Akron rubber workers strike, on the activities of the National War Labor Board, on the U.S. government's takeover of railroads in December 1943, on the postwar decline of Henry A. Wallace's Progressive Party, on postwar concerns about a potential alliance between "an extremely nationalistic Germany and Soviet Russia," on efforts in the late 1940s to purge Communists from unions, and on efforts by Communist labor leaders to survive those efforts, among hundreds of other topics.

Stark's Times obituary drew special attention to a series of articles he had written on the battles in the Harlan County, Kentucky, coal fields, and to the "virtual running account" he had provided to Times readers "of the union organizing campaigns, including the rise of the Congress of Industrial Organizations, the sit-down strikes and John L. Lewis." The Times also noted his coverage of the heresy trial of Bishop William Montgomery and of the Sacco-Vanzetti case. An account by Stark of the latter case appeared in a book by Times writers entitled "We Saw It Happen".

Senator Paul Douglas, Democrat of Illinois, once said on the Senate floor: "I have never known Lou Stark to make a factual error in a story."

In 1951, Stark left Washington to become an editorial writer for the Times in New York. At a dinner marking his farewell to Washington, Fred Perkins of the Scripps-Howard Newspaper Alliance said: "We regard Louis Stark as the pioneer of labor reporters. He has made the daily affairs of labor unions sought-for news among the newspapers." When he departed Washington, former President Truman said in a statement: "I want you to know that you carry with you in your new position the respect and admiration of all those who have had the privilege of knowing you and of reading your careful reporting." From 1951 to 1954, he was a member of the Times editorial department in New York.

His last editorial, "Trade Union Democracy," written on the last day of his life, noted approvingly the decision of the Upholsterers International Union of North America to create an independent "court" that would allow any union member at risk of being punished by their unions "to put his case before an impartial nine-man board of jurists, educators and former public officials."

== Book ==
He wrote Labor and the New Deal: Public Affairs Pamphlets, Number 2 (1936).

== Other writings ==
He also wrote for The Annals of the American Academy of Political and Social Science, Survey Graphic, The Atlantic Monthly, The Yale Review, The Nation's Business, The Outlook, and Current History.

== Honors and awards ==
In 1937, he received an Honorary Doctorate of Law from Reed College. "In these times of strife, when the reason of men is clouded by passion and counsel is darkened by warring opinions," read the citation, "the people of this country are deeply indebted to Mr. Stark for his accurate and fair recording of events in the field of industrial relations. ... he leads his readers from darkness to light. He has shown that facts may be interesting and far better than fiction and propaganda. Never seeking publicity for himself, he has brought distinction to a great newspaper by living up to his ideal of searching for and presenting the whole truth."

In 1942, Stark won the Pulitzer Prize for Telegraphic Reporting "for his distinguished reporting of important labor stories during the year."

== Personal life ==
Stark married Jennie S. House in 1916. They had one son, Arthur, who at the time of Stark's death was executive secretary of the New York State Mediation Board.

== Death ==
Stark died suddenly, only three hours after his wife had telephoned his last editorial to the Times offices. His obituary and a memorial tribute appeared in the same issue as his last editorial. He "had suffered a series of mild heart attacks" during the months before his death.

== Legacy ==
A memorial article in the New York Times described Stark as

a colleague for whom we had a warm affection, Quiet and unassuming, with a kindly sense of humor, he had a devotion to duty that found him writing a final editorial on the very day of his death, even though he had excused himself from coming to the office. ... By contributing to full information on the problems of labor, its living conditions, its working conditions, and its aspirations Louis Stark served, by his own efforts, to improve the lot of the working man.

Writing in 1993 about the many New York Times journalists who have won Pulitzer Prizes, Arnold Beichman counted Stark among the small number of those winners who were "truly great journalists," along with William Safire, James Reston, A. M. Rosenthal, and Brooks Atkinson.

In 1955, the U.S. Department of Labor incorporated the Louis Stark Memorial Fund "to foster improvement in labor relations, research and reporting."

The Nieman Foundation awards the Louis Stark Nieman Fellowship in honor of Stark's memory.
