= 1945 Detroit mayoral election =

- November 6, 1945
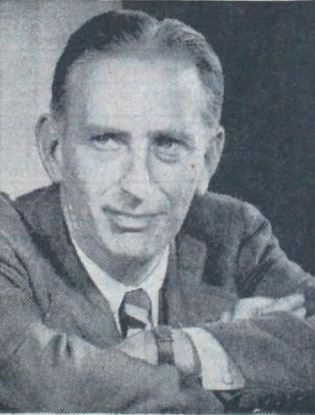

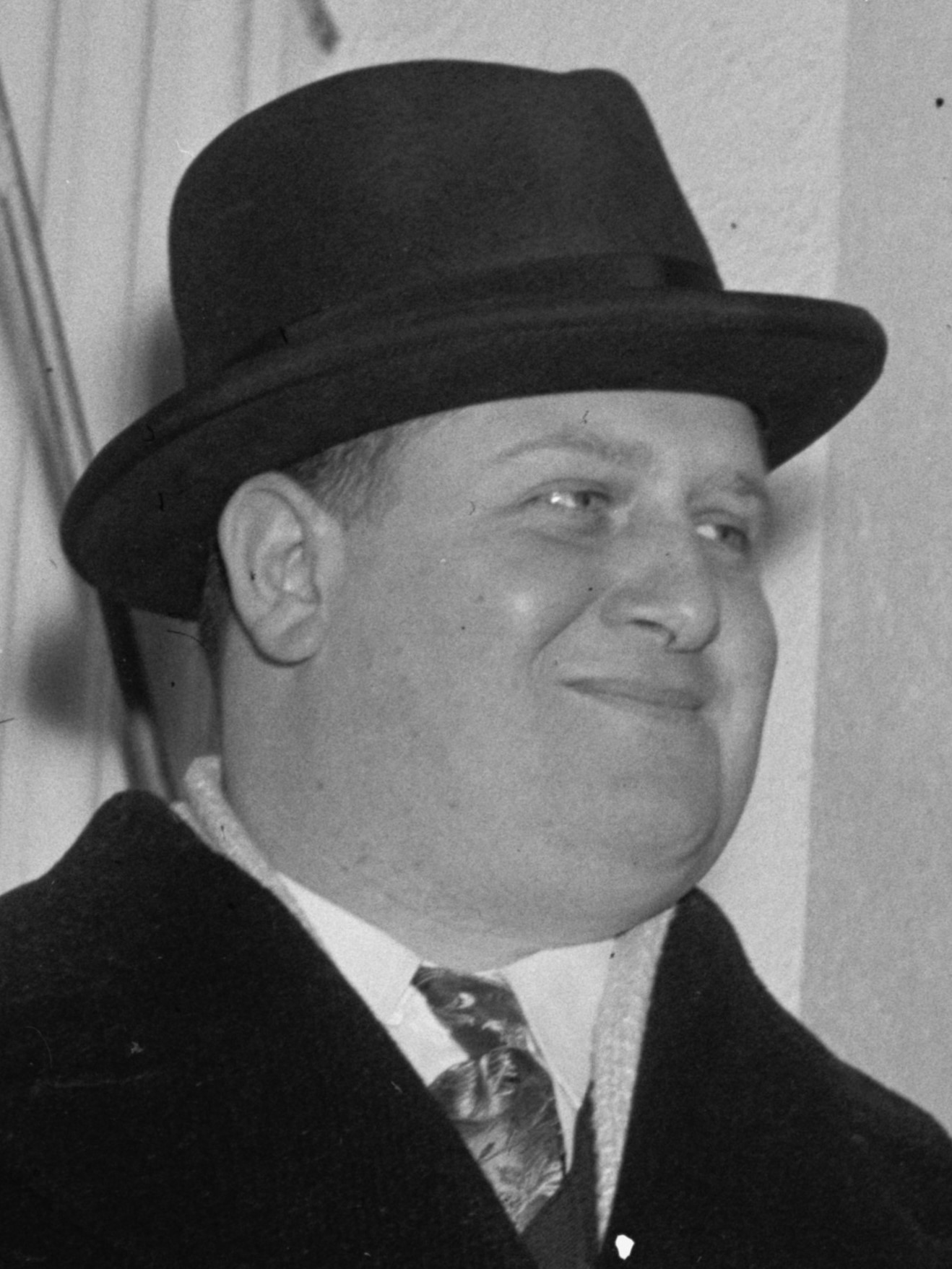
Candidate	Edward J. Jeffries Jr.	Richard Frankensteen
Party	Nonpartisan	Nonpartisan
Popular vote	274,802	217,208
Percentage	54.85%	43.35%
Mayor before election
Edward J. Jeffries Jr.
Elected mayor
Edward J. Jeffries Jr.

The Detroit mayoral election of 1945 took place on November 6, 1945. It saw the reelection of incumbent mayor Edward J. Jeffries Jr. to a fourth term.

== Candidates ==
- Edward J. Jeffries Jr., incumbent mayor
- Richard Frankensteen, vice president of the United Auto Workers

== Results ==
=== General election ===
1945 Detroit mayoral general election Nonpartisan election
Candidate	Votes	%
Edward J. Jeffries Jr. (incumbent)	274,802	54.85
Richard Frankensteen	217,208	43.35
Write-ins	9,037	1.80
Total votes	501,047	100
