= Emil Mazey =

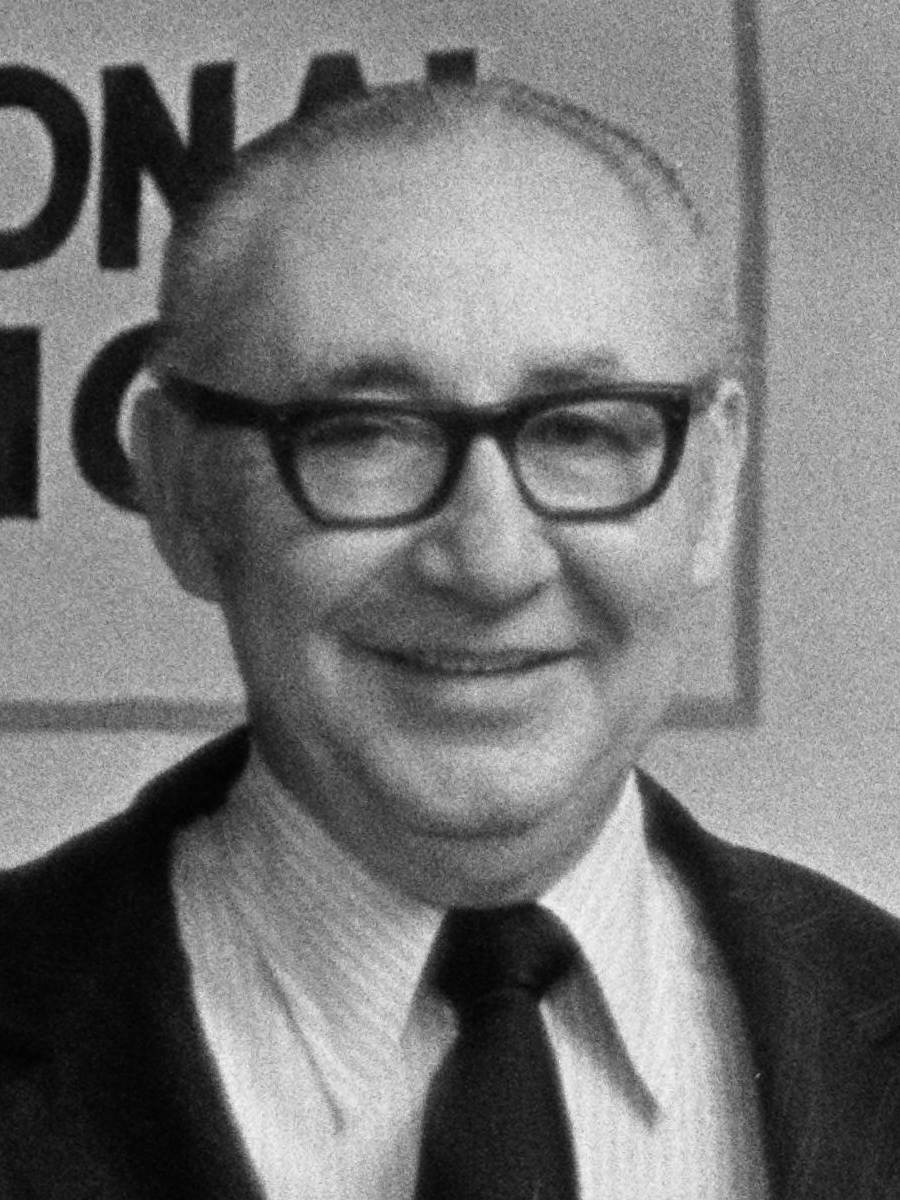
Mazey in 1972

Emil L. Mazey (August 2, 1913 – October 9, 1983) was a Canadian-born American labor union leader.

== Biography ==
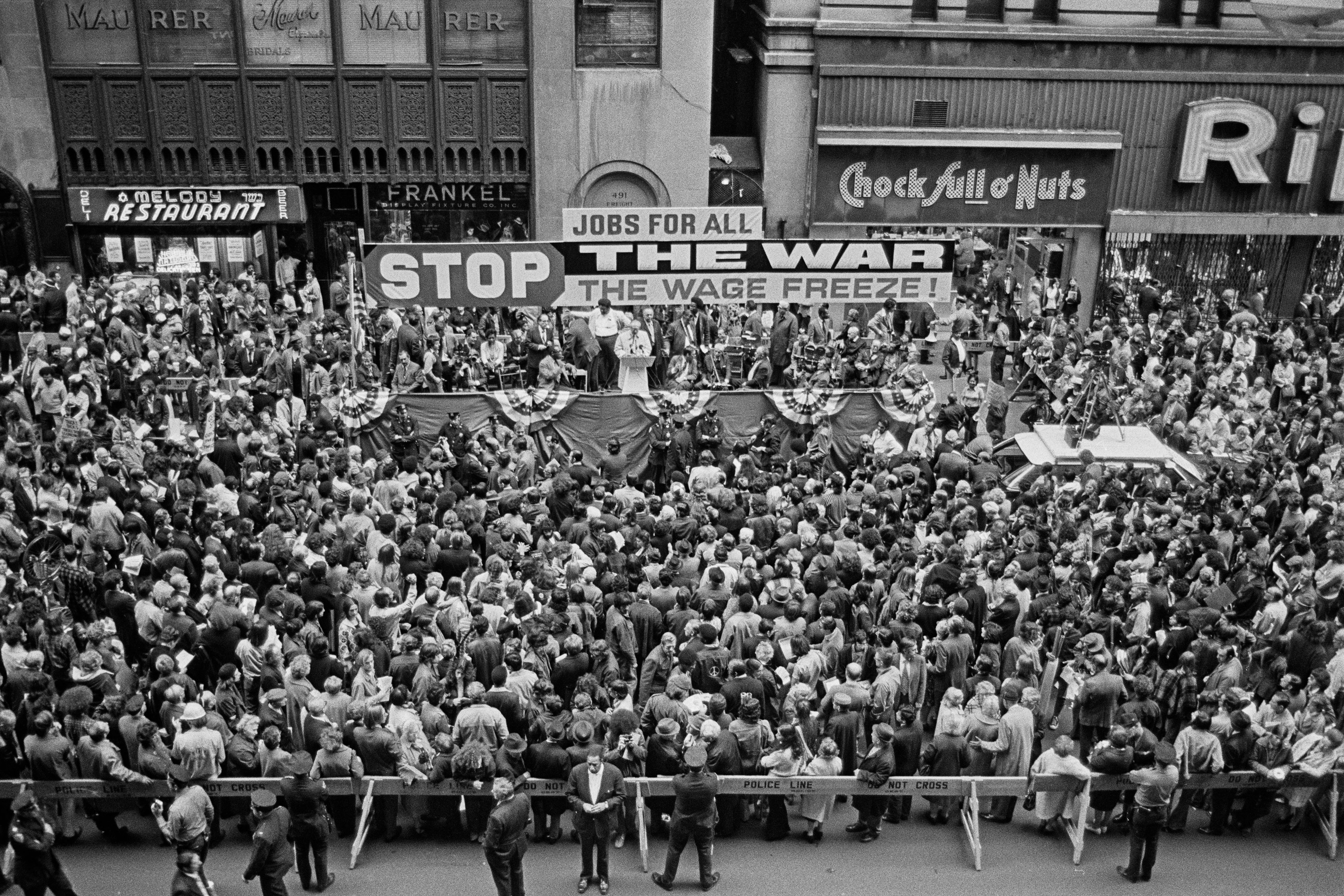
Mazey addesses a Moratorium to End the War in Vietnam rally in the Garment District, Manhattan, New York, October 13, 1971

Born in Regina, Saskatchewan, Mazey moved with his family to Detroit when he was two years old. He was educated at the Cass Technical High School. In the early 1930s, he was an organizer of the Unemployed Citizens' League in the city. This led him into work in the labor movement, and he lost two jobs due to his union activity. By 1941, he was working for the United Auto Workers (UAW), for which he organized workers at the Ford River Rouge complex.

Mazey served in World War II, and was assigned as a feature writer for the Army Tagalog Times, based in the Philippines. He used the post to expose government waste, and later to argue that demobilization should be accelerated. He also organized demonstrations in support of faster demobilization.

In 1947, Mazey was elected as secretary-treasurer of the UAW. In 1948, he served as term as a vice-president of the Congress of Industrial Organizations. He organized rallies to oppose the Vietnam War, which attracted the enmity of George Meany, who supported the war. He supported the union's 1968 disaffiliation from the AFL-CIO. In 1970, he briefly served as acting president of the union, when Walter P. Reuther died.

Mazey retired in 1980, and died three years later.

Trade union offices
Preceded by George Addes	Secretary-Treasurer of the United Auto Workers; 1947–1980	Succeeded by Ray Majerus
