= Milton Brooks =

American photojournalist (1901–1956)

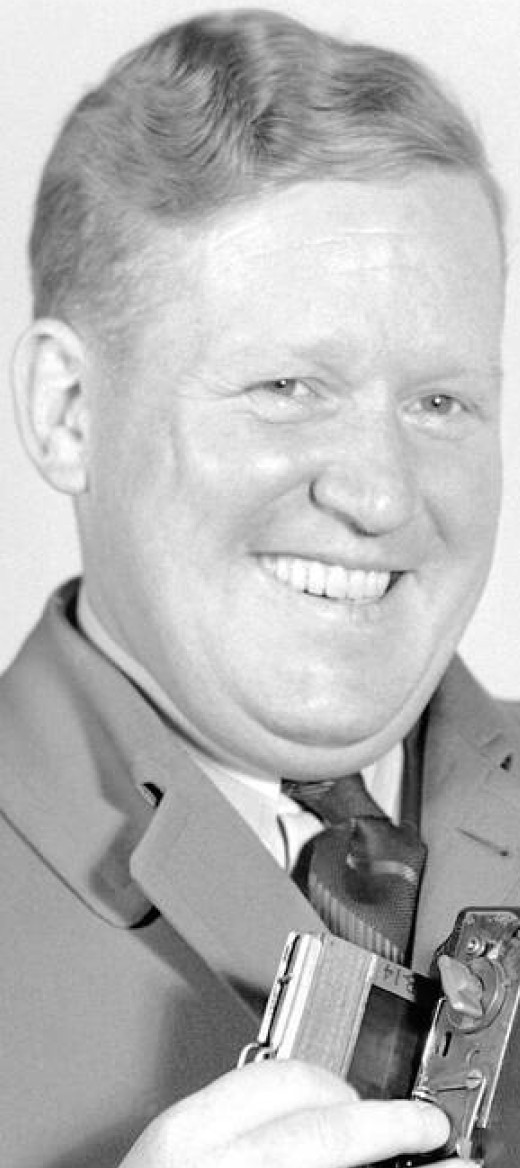
- Brooks in 1942
- Born: Milton E. Brooks; August 29, 1901; St. Louis, Missouri US
- Died: September 3, 1956 (aged 55); Grosse Pointe Park, Michigan, US
- Other name: Pete
- Occupation: Photojournalist

Milton E. "Pete" Brooks (August 29, 1901 – September 3, 1956) was an American photojournalist who won the first Pulitzer Prize for Photography in 1942.

== Biography ==
Brooks was born on August 29, 1901, in St. Louis. His father, James W. Brooks, was also a newspaper reporter and "desk man". Brooks worked for the Chicago Daily News, the Chicago Herald-Examiner, New York Daily News, and Paramount News. From 1928 to 1953, he was a staff photographer for The Detroit News. He typically took one photograph per event, waiting for the most interesting thing to happen. After leaving The Detroit News, he became a commercial photographer. Physically, he was a stocky red-headed man, and he hobbied in boating. He died on September 3, 1956, aged 55, in Grosse Pointe Park, Michigan.

== Ford Strikers Riot ==
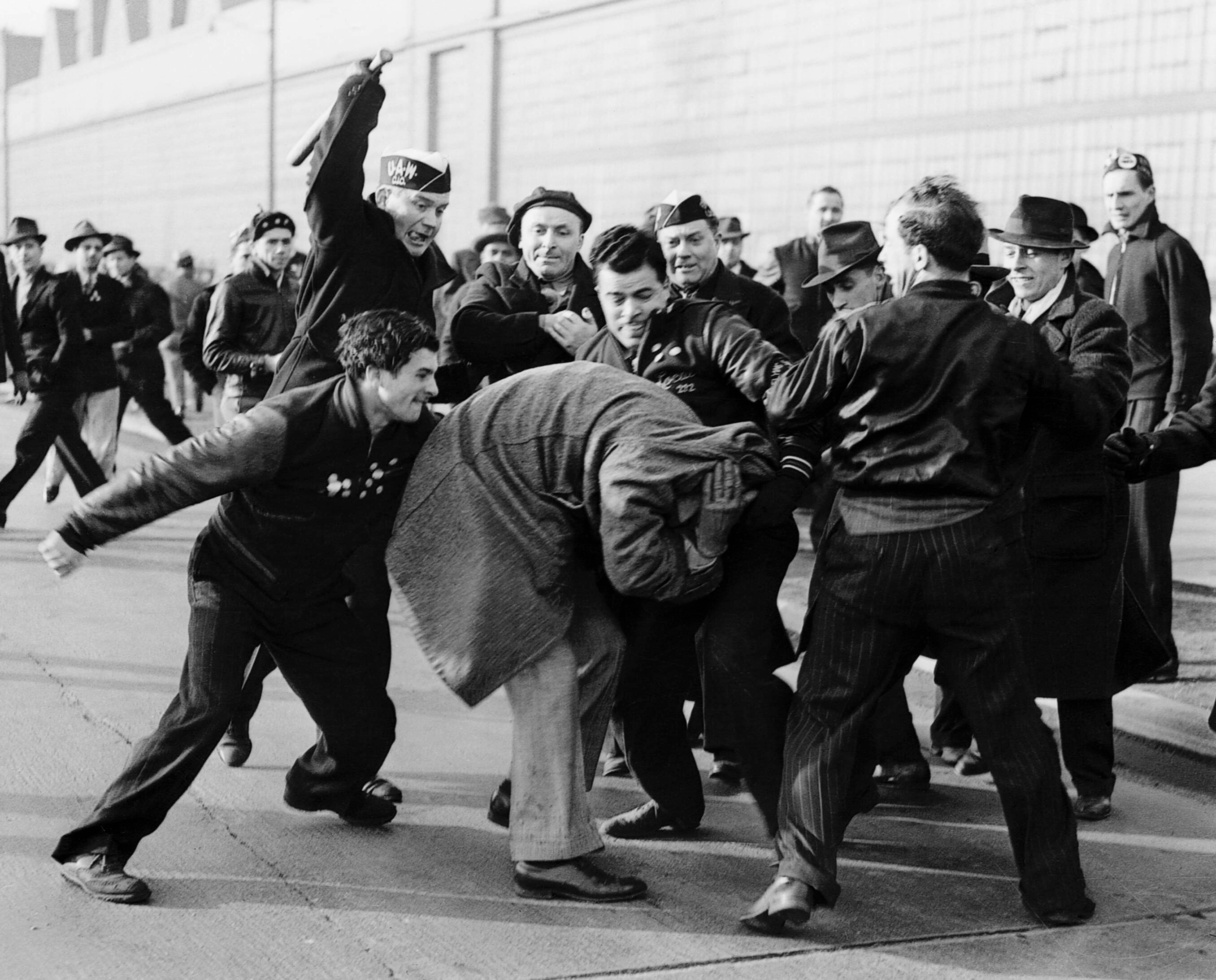
Ford Strikers Riot (1941)

In 1942, Brooks won the inaugural Pulitzer Prize for Photography. The photograph, which he took on April 3, 1941, was named The Picket Line in an early mention, though came to be known as Ford Strikers Riot. It was taken during the 1941 workers' strike at the Ford River Rouge complex, and depicts strikers beating a strikebreaker, who is trying to protect himself by pulling his coat over his head and face. Brooks was awarded $500 by newspaperman Geoffrey Parsons for the photograph, as well as a $100 prize in the seventh Editor & Publisher photography contest on April 17.

Describing the circumstances surrounding the photo, Brooks said, "I took the picture quickly, hid the camera under my coat and ducked into the crowd. A lot of people would have liked to wreck that picture".
