= Ford Strikers Riot =

1941 photograph by Milton Brooks

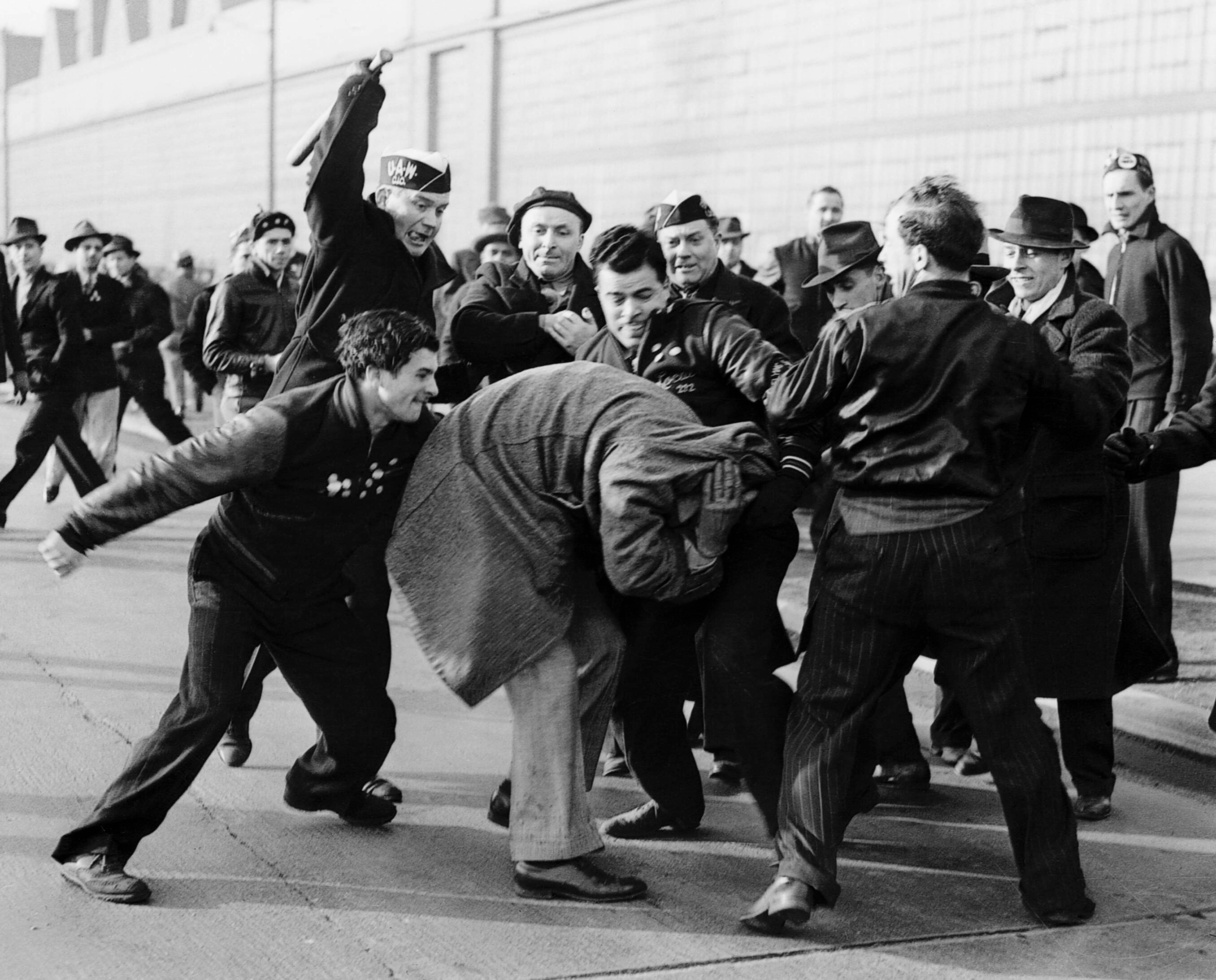
The Pulitzer Prize-winning photograph was taken on April 3, 1941.

Ford Strikers Riot is a 1941 photograph which shows a strikebreaker getting beaten by United Auto Workers (UAW) strikers who had been picketing at the Ford Motor Company's Rouge Plant. Photographer Milton Brooks captured the image and it won the first Pulitzer Prize for Photography in 1942. The image has been called a portrayal of the struggle in America between capital and labor.

== Background ==
The image was taken in Dearborn, Michigan at the Rouge Plant of the Ford Motor Company during a worker strike action on April 3, 1941. In its 40-year history, Ford Motor Company had never been closed as a result of a worker strike. The workers defied the company, the state police, and the strikebreakers.

The image was captured by The Detroit News photographer Milton Brooks. During the incident, a peaceful picketing of the Ford Motor Company was interrupted when a single man clashed with the UAW strikers. The man ignored the advice of the Michigan State Police and crossed the picket lines. Brooks, who was waiting with other photojournalists outside the Ford factory gates, took only one photograph and said: "I took the picture quickly, hid the camera ... ducked into the crowd ... a lot of people would have liked to wreck that picture."

== Description ==
The image shows United Auto Workers (UAW) strikers beating a strikebreaker with his coat pulled over his head. He is surrounded by eight men with clenched fists and clubs. After the photo was taken, the man was bleeding and stunned and was taken to the Ford Motor Company's hospital. The Times of Shreveport, Louisiana described the scene by saying, "strikers rain blows on a man who shields himself with his coat in an early morning outbreak of hostilities".

== Reception ==
The image won the first Pulitzer Prize for Photography in 1942, juried by Herbert Brucker, Richard F. Crandell, and Roscoe B. Ellard. The new photography category had 109 entries. The jury selected 11 finalists, deliberated, and concluded: "This brutal picture [...] sums up much of the labor history of 1941." The Los Angeles Times, at the time, referred to the photograph as a "dramatic picture of a gang in action". The award was accompanied by a prize of US$500 (equivalent to $10,000 in 2025).

In Carol Quirke's 2012 book Eyes on Labor, she stated that photography plays a partisan role for both employers and employees, and that this image portrays the struggle in America between capital and labor.

== See also ==
- Battle of the Overpass, another famous photograph and incident
- Ford Hunger March
- List of photographs considered the most important
