= Ford Hunger March =

1932 demonstration in Detroit and Dearborn, Michigan

- Date: March 7, 1932; 94 years ago
- Location: Dearborn, Michigan, US; 42.3076°N 83.1558°W
- Goals: 14 demands for workers' rights

Parties
Unemployed auto workers	Ford Motor Company

Lead figures
Albert Goetz; John Schmies	Ford security and city police

Casualties
- Deaths: 5 protesters
- Injuries: 22 protesters and 25 police

The Ford Hunger March, sometimes called the Ford Massacre, was a demonstration on March 7, 1932, in the United States by at least 3,000 unemployed auto workers in Detroit, Michigan during the height of the Great Depression. The one-mile march started in Detroit and ended at the River Rouge complex in Dearborn, Michigan. Dearborn Police and the security guards employed by the Ford Motor Company shot and killed four workers with many others injured by gunfire. A fifth worker died of his injuries five months later.

The march was supported by the Unemployed Councils, a project of the Communist Party USA. It was followed by the Battle of the Overpass in 1937, and was an important part of a chain of events that resulted in the unionization of the Automotive industry in the United States.

== Background ==
In the 1920s, prosperity came to the Detroit area, because of the successes of the U.S. auto industry in that decade. Concentrated in the Detroit area, the industry produced 5,337,000 vehicles in 1929, when many individuals bought their first cars. The 1930 United States census reported the population as 122,775,046. As a point of reference, in 2008, the U.S. auto industry produced 8,681,000 vehicles in 2008 and the U.S. population was estimated at 304,375,000. Therefore, the U.S. auto industry was producing 50% more vehicles per capita in 1929, than in the early 21st century with more competition from foreign auto makers.

On October 29, 1929, the stock market crashed, leading to the Great Depression. Vehicle production in the country plummeted. In 1930, production declined to 3,363,000 vehicles. In 1931, production fell to 1,332,000 vehicles, only 25% of the production of two years before.

As a result, unemployment in Detroit skyrocketed, and the wages of those still working were slashed. In 1929, the average annual wage for auto workers was US$1,639 (equivalent to about $30,700 in 2025). By 1931, it had fallen 54% to $757 (equivalent to $16,000 in 2025). By 1932, 400,000 were unemployed in Michigan.

Detroit had 113 suicides in 1927, increased to 568 in 1931. In that year, the welfare allowance was $0.15 (equivalent to $3.18 in 2025) per person per day. At the time, neither states nor the federal government provided unemployment insurance, and Social Security did not yet exist. A wave of bank closures destroyed the life savings of many unemployed workers and retirees, as every neighborhood bank in Detroit went out of business. The Federal Deposit Insurance Corporation had not yet been established by Congress to secure bank deposits and protect people's savings. By 1932, foreclosures, evictions, repossessions, and bankruptcies were commonplace, and the unemployed despaired.

== The Hunger March ==
The Great Depression is cited as the cause of massive lay-offs among Ford workers. The Detroit Unemployed Council helped the unemployed workers against being evicted from their homes and connected them with charitable agencies. The Unemployed Councils and the Auto, Aircraft and Vehicle Workers of America called for a march on Monday, March 7, 1932, from Detroit to the Ford River Rouge Complex, the company's largest factory, in Dearborn. The principal organizers of the march were Albert Goetz, a leader of the Detroit Unemployed Council, and John Schmies, the Communist candidate for mayor of Detroit. Detroit, led by Mayor Frank Murphy, whom one historian describes as "slightly radical", granted the march a permit. Dearborn Mayor Clyde Ford, a relative of Henry Ford and the owner of a Ford dealership, did not.

On March 6, William Z. Foster, secretary of the Trade Union Unity League and a leader of the Communist Party, gave a speech in Detroit in preparation for the march. The marchers intended to present 14 demands to Henry Ford, the head of the Ford Motor Company. The demands included rehiring the unemployed, providing funds for health care, ending racial discrimination in hiring and promotions, providing winter fuel for the unemployed, abolishing the use of company spies and private police against workers, and acknowledging workers' right to organize unions.

On March 7, a crowd estimated at between 3,000 to 5,000 gathered near the Dearborn city limits, about one mile from the Ford plant. The Detroit Times called it "one of the coldest days of the winter, with a frigid gale whooping out of the northwest". Marchers carried banners reading "Give Us Work", "We Want Bread Not Crumbs", and "Tax the Rich and Feed the Poor". Albert Goetz gave a speech, asking that the marchers avoid violence. The march proceeded peacefully along the streets of Detroit to the Dearborn city limits.

There, the Dearborn police attempted to stop the march by firing tear gas into the crowd and hitting marchers with clubs. One officer fired a gun in the direction of the marchers. The unarmed crowd scattered into a field and from there threw stones at the police. The marchers regrouped then and advanced nearly one mile toward the plant. There, two fire engines sprayed cold water onto the marchers from an overpass. The police were joined by Ford security guards and fired into the crowd. Marchers Joseph York (20), Kalman Leny (26), and Joseph DeBlasio (31) were killed, and at least 22 others were wounded by gunfire.

The leaders canceled the march and began an orderly retreat. Harry Bennett, head of Ford security, drove up in a car, opened a window, and fired a pistol into the crowd. Immediately, his car was pelted with rocks, and Bennett was injured. He exited the car and continued firing at the retreating marchers. Dearborn police and Ford security men opened fire with machine guns on the retreating marchers. Joseph Bussell (16) was killed, dozens more men were wounded, and Bennett was hospitalized.

About 25 Dearborn police officers were injured by thrown rocks and other debris, none by gunfire.

== Aftermath ==
All of the seriously wounded marchers were arrested, and the police chained many to their hospital beds after they were admitted for treatment. A nationwide search was conducted for William Z. Foster, but he was not arrested. No law enforcement or Ford security officer was arrested, although all reliable reports showed that only they had engaged in gunfire, resulting in deaths, injuries, and property damage. The New York Times reported that "Dearborn streets were stained with blood, streets were littered with broken glass and the wreckage of bullet-riddled automobiles, and nearly every window in the Ford plant's employment building had been broken".

The following day, Detroit newspapers reported sensational and mistaken accounts of the violence, apparently based on rumors or false police reports. The Detroit Free Press, for example, falsely claimed that Harry Bennett and four policemen had been shot. The Detroit Press said that "six shots fired by a communist hiding behind a parked car were cited by police Monday night as the match which touched off a riot at the Ford Motor Company plant". The Detroit Times wrote that "These professional Communists alone are morally guilty of the assaults and killings which took place before the Ford plant." The Mirror ran a headline saying "Red Leaders Facing Murder Trials". The national press was more critical of the security forces. The New York Herald Tribune wrote: "The Dearborn police are to be condemned for using guns on an unarmed crowd, for viciously bad judgment and for the killing of four men."

In the following days, the local newspapers gathered more information and changed their tone, reassigning blame for the deaths and severe injuries of unemployed and unarmed workers. The Detroit Times, for example, said that "Someone, it is now admitted, blundered in the handling of the throng of Hunger Marchers that sought to present petitions at the Ford plant in River Rouge." It called "the killing of obscure workmen, innocent of crime ... a blow directed at the very heart of American institutions." The Detroit News reported that "Insofar as the demonstration itself had leaders present in the march, they appear to have warned the participants against a fight."

The mainstream trade union movement spoke out against the killings. The Detroit Federation of Labor, affiliated with the American Federation of Labor, issued a statement saying that "The outrageous murdering of workers at the Ford Motor Plant in Dearborn on Monday has cast a stain on this community that will remain a disgrace for many years."

On March 12, an estimated 25,000 to 60,000 people participated in a funeral procession for the four dead marchers, who were buried side by side in Woodmere Cemetery in Detroit. The slogan of the funeral march was "Smash the Ford-Murphy Terror". A fifth marcher, Curtis Williams (36), died of injuries five months later on August 7, 1932. When Woodmere Cemetery refused to allow Williams, an African American, to be buried there, Williams's family arranged for his cremation. The union chartered an airplane to scattered his ashes over the River Rouge complex.

Detroit Mayor Frank Murphy said that "the chaining of patient prisoners to beds is a brutal practice that should find no encouragement in an enlightened hospital". Murphy was criticized because some observers thought Detroit police may have been involved in the violence, but a historian writing nearly 50 years later described their role as "peripheral". Murphy denounced Harry Bennett as an "inhuman brute" and called Henry Ford a "terrible man". He asked, "What is the difference between the official Dearborn police and Ford's guards?" His answer was, "A legalistic one." Murphy's profile rose after the incident. He became Governor of Michigan and ended his public career as an Associate Justice of the US Supreme Court.

Nine years later, on April 11, 1941, after the economy had begun to recover and 40,000 Ford workers conducted a ten-day sit down strike, Henry Ford signed a collective bargaining agreement with the United Auto Workers union.

== Grand Jury report ==
Prosecutor Harry S. Toy convened a grand jury to investigate the violence. In its report, issued at the end of June, the grand jury reported finding no basis for indictments, but condemned the demonstrators and exculpated the security forces in detail: "We find that the conduct of the demonstrators was ill-considered and unlawful in their utter disregard for constituted authority. We find, further, that the conduct of the Dearborn City Police when they first met the demonstrators, though well-intended, might have been more discreet, and better considered before they applied force in the form of tear gas. However, we believe that the said police discharged what they conscientiously considered to be their sworn duty as law enforcing officials, alike when they intercepted the rioters at the city's limit, using tear gas and in the critical and violent situation which ensued employing gunfire to protect life and property, which were then manifestly in danger."

Grand juror Mrs. Jerry Houghton Bacon, a political ally of Detroit Mayor Murphy, dissented from the report, calling the grand jury "the most biased, prejudiced, and ignorant proceeding imaginable". She reported "the most glaring discrimination on the parts of the prosecutors in the treatment of witnesses brought before the grand jury" and said that "Marked prejudice was voiced by the prosecutors which, without regard to its intent, impressed and influenced the minds of the jurors."

== In popular culture ==
Fort Street Bridge – Song by Wakefire on Voyages, Dreams, & Other Stories. Released September 1, 2022. Lyrics by Sarah O’Brien, Music by Sarah O’Brien and Bubba Wilson

== Contemporary documentation ==
The archives of Walter P. Reuther Library, Wayne State University, include photographic evidence of the march and the funerals that followed. Detroit members of the Workers Film and Photo League recorded news footage of the march and produced its own newsreel that was presented at radical meetings around the country.

== See also ==
- Ford Strikers Riot, Pulitzer Prize-winning photo
- Murder of workers in labor disputes in the United States
- Unemployment in the United States
