= Battle of the Overpass =

1937 violence against union organizers in Dearborn, Michigan, USA

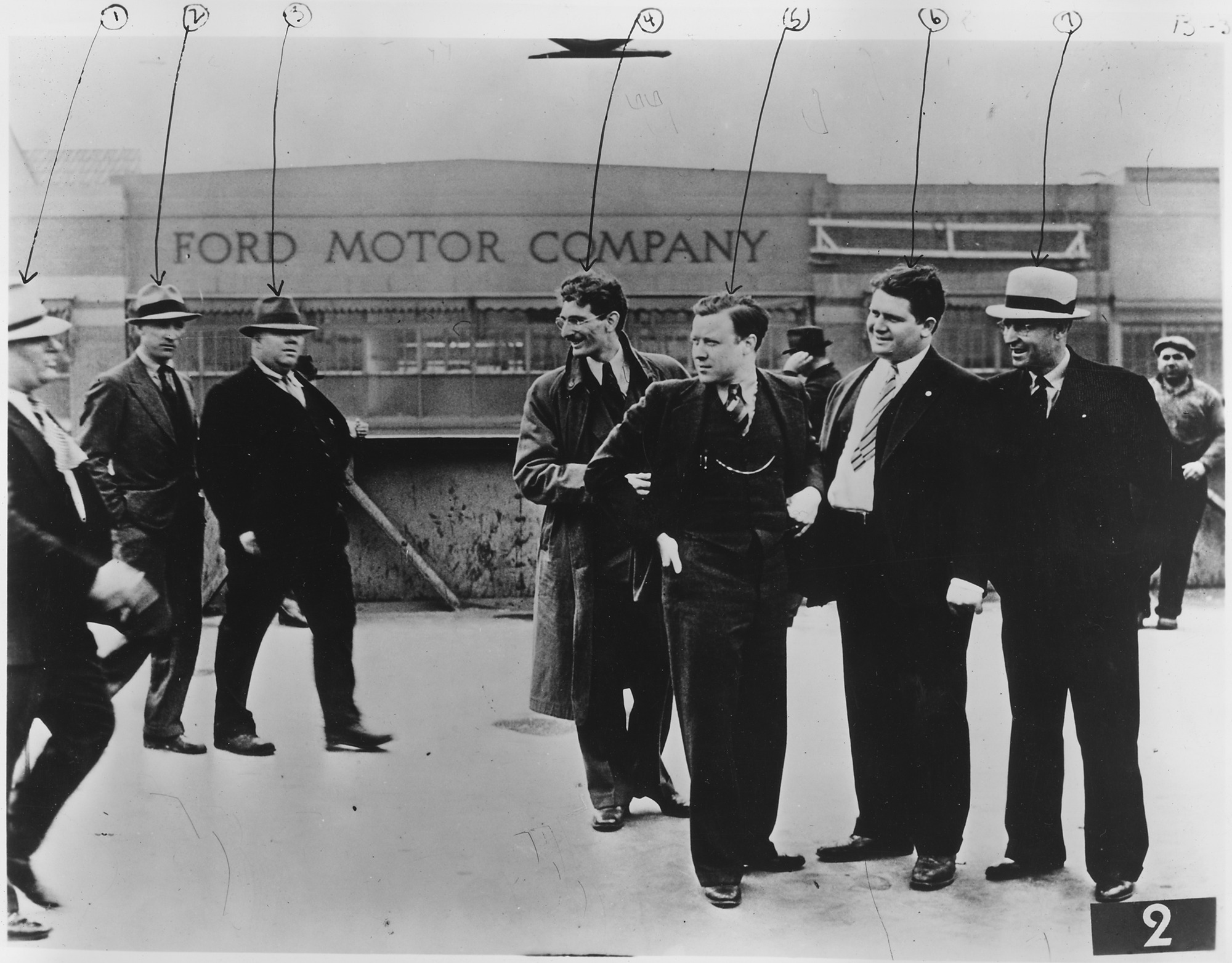
- The confrontation began on the overpass, between Ford Service Department (left) and UAW organizers (right), with Walter Reuther fifth from the left and Richard Frankensteen sixth.
- Date: May 26, 1937; 89 years ago
- Location: Dearborn, Michigan; 42.3076°N 83.1558°W
- Goals: Distribution of leaflets promoting union membership to plant workers

Parties
United Auto Workers Local 174	Ford Motor Company

Lead figures
Walter Reuther; Richard Frankensteen	Henry Ford; Harry Bennett

Casualties
- Deaths: 0
- Injuries: 16

The Battle of the Overpass was an attack by Ford Motor Company against the United Auto Workers (UAW) on May 26, 1937, at the River Rouge complex in Dearborn, Michigan. The UAW had recently organized workers at Ford's competitors, and planned to hand out leaflets at an overpass leading to the plant's main gate in view of many of the 90,000 employees. Before the UAW organizers could begin, they were attacked by Ford's "quasi-military" security service and the Dearborn police.

In the aftermath, Ford Motor Company attempted to control the narrative by destroying news photographs onsite. The surviving photographs were published nationally as evidence of Ford's brutality, helping to turn public perception in favor of the union.

The incident had been preceded five years earlier by the 1932 Ford Hunger March, in which hunger marchers were attacked with gunfire from the Miller Road pedestrian overpasses. The site of that attack remained an entrance to the Rouge plant, and the overpass bears the logo of the United Auto Workers in addition to Ford's.

== Background ==
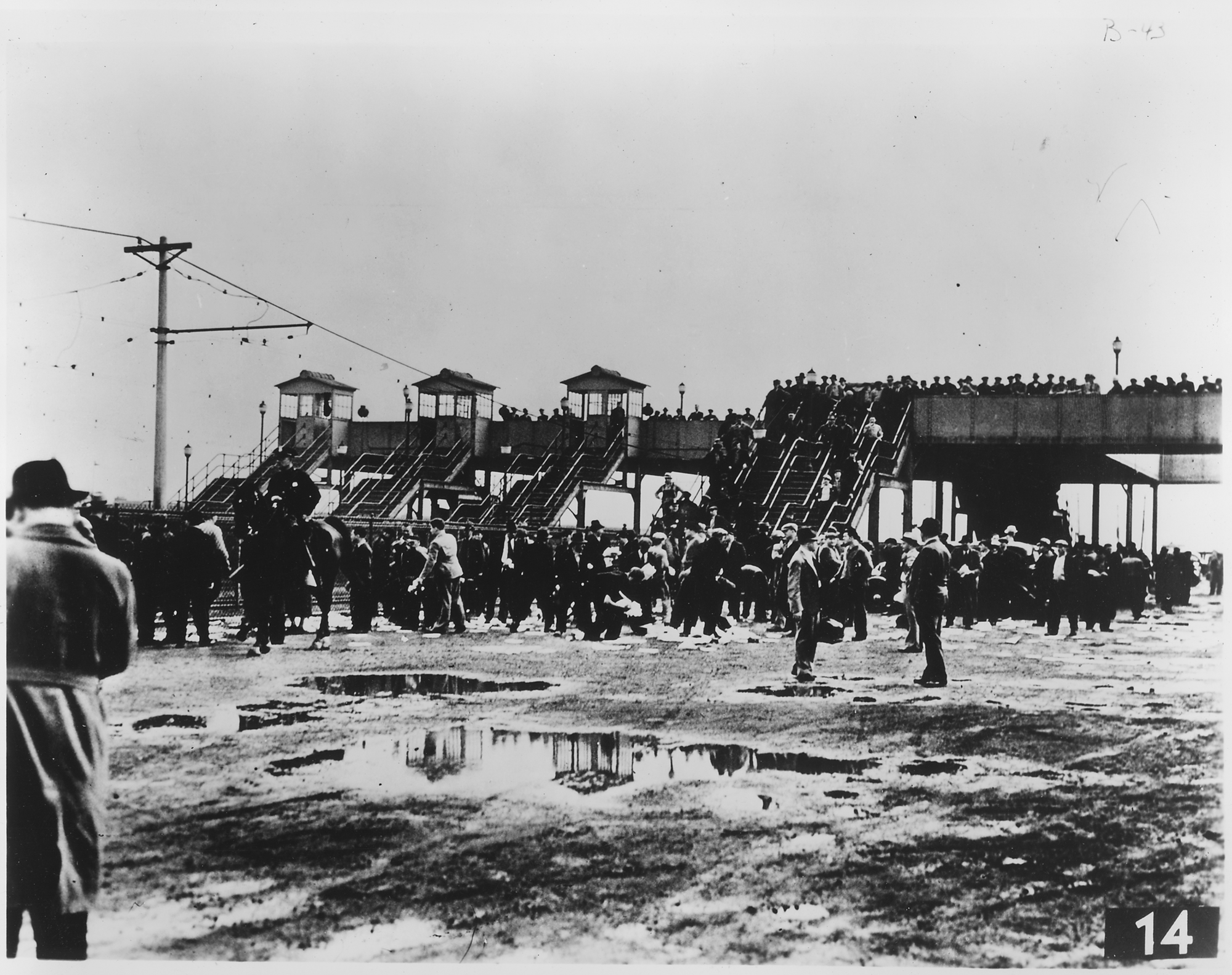
The incident was at the pedestrian overpass at the River Rouge Plant.

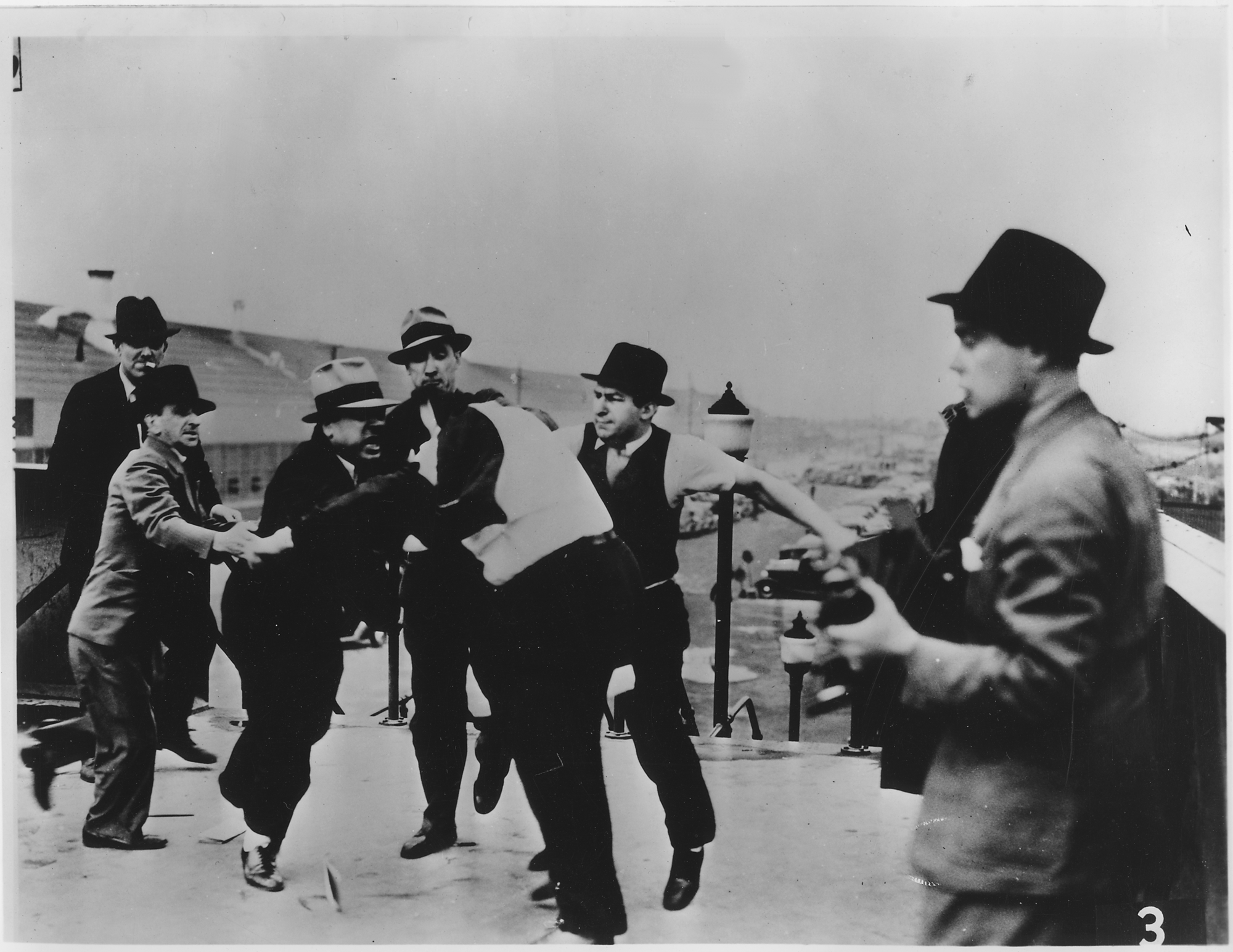
Frankensteen was attacked by Ford Service Department members.

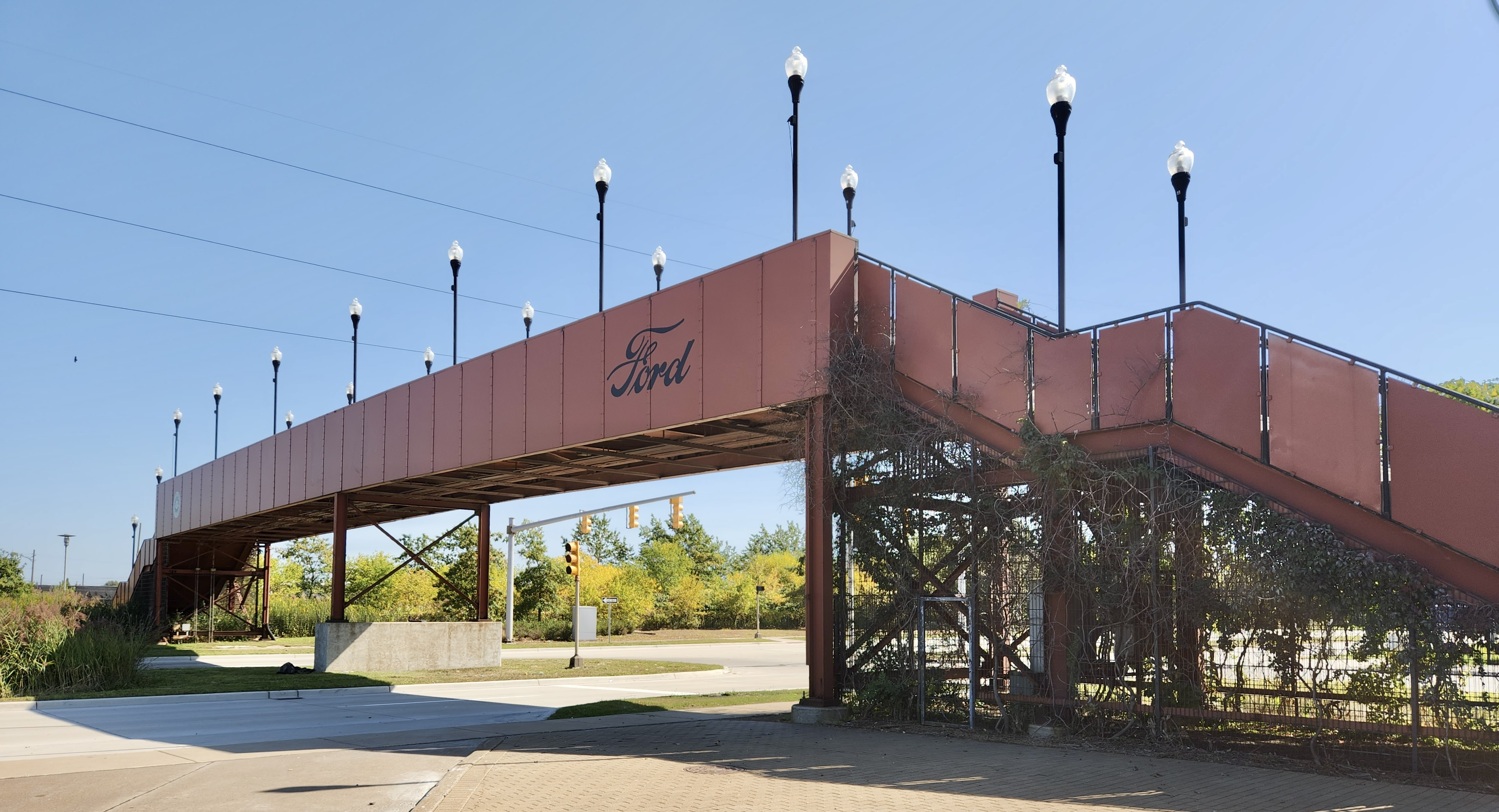
The overpass was rebuilt and also has the logo of United Auto Workers on the left side (2023).

The United Auto Workers labor union was founded in 1935, and by 1937 it had attracted significant support. Strikes in the United States in the 1930s extracted major concessions from employers in multiple industries, although they often resulted in violence against strikers.

Though strikes resulted in major victories against employers nationally, the Ford Motor Company proved difficult to organize. Ford controlled the city government of Dearborn, and used its police department alongside the company's Service Department to violently intimidate Ford workers and union organizers. Workers were routinely surveilled inside and outside the plants, at the direction of Harry Bennett, former boxer and personal associate of Henry Ford. At its peak, the Ford Service Department numbered 3,000 spies and thugs, and was described by The New York Times as "the largest private quasi-military organization in existence".

The most extreme example of Ford's repression was the Ford Hunger March (or Ford Massacre) of 1932, which was planned as a peaceful march from Detroit into Dearborn, ending at the Rouge Plant employment office on Miller Road. The march was brutally suppressed by Bennett, his forces, and the Dearborn police, with five marchers killed and dozens injured by machine gun fire.

Ford's history of brutality against union organizers was accompanied by an understanding of the power of its workforce. The Local 174 chapter of UAW organized a sit-down strike against the Kelsey-Hayes Wheel Company of Detroit in early December 1936, which impacted production at the Rouge plant. Local 174 gained members rapidly after its success at Kelsey-Hayes, and planned to organize the workers at the much larger Rouge plant. Tactics developed at Kelsey-Hayes were used at the Flint sit-down strike later that month, which resulted in major gains in membership and national recognition for the UAW.

== Conflict ==
UAW Local 174 planned a leaflet campaign titled, "Unionism, Not Fordism", at the pedestrian overpass above Miller Road at Gate 4 of the River Rouge Plant complex. The leaflet campaign was planned for the shift change, when many of the plant's 90,000 workers would be present. Miller Road and the overpass were both considered public property, and Reuther held a permit for the leaflet campaign from the city of Dearborn.

The leaflets to be distributed by the UAW demanded a work day plan of six hours for US$8 (equivalent to $179 in 2025), in contrast to the eight-hour day for $6 (equivalent to $134 in 2025) then in place. The leaflets cited the success of the organizers at General Motors, Chrysler, and Briggs Manufacturing Company, and promised that the UAW would "End the Ford Service System".

At approximately 2 p.m., several of the leading UAW union organizers, including Walter Reuther and Richard Frankensteen, were asked by a Detroit News photographer, James R. "Scotty" Kilpatrick, to pose for a picture on the overpass, with the Ford sign in the background. While they were posing, men from Ford's Service Department came from behind and beat them. The number of attackers is disputed, but may have been 40. The Union breakers were identified as Pinkertons.

Frankensteen had his jacket pulled over his head and was kicked and punched. Reuther described the attack:

Seven times they raised me off the concrete and slammed me down on it. They pinned my arms ... and I was punched and kicked and dragged by my feet to the stairway, thrown down the first flight of steps, picked up, slammed down on the platform and kicked down the second flight. On the ground they beat and kicked me some more...

One union organizer, Richard Merriweather, suffered a broken back from the beating.

== Aftermath ==
The security forces mob attempted to destroy photographic plates, but the Detroit News photographer James R. Kilpatrick hid the plates under the back seat of his car, and surrendered useless plates he had on his front seat. News and photos of the brutal attack made headlines in newspapers across the country.

In spite of the photographs, and many witnesses who had heard his men specifically seek out Frankensteen and Reuther, security director Bennett claimed — "The affair was deliberately provoked by union officials. ... They simply wanted to trump up a charge of Ford brutality. ... I know definitely no Ford service man or plant police were involved in any way in the fight."

The incident greatly increased support for the UAW and hurt Ford's reputation. The National Labor Relations Board pursued a case against the Ford Motor Company, bringing to light other violations of federal law, such as the National Labor Relations Act, committed by the company. The Battle of the Overpass led to a series of actions against Ford by the UAW, culminating in a 1941 strike at the Rouge. The 1941 strike concluded with a signed contract between the UAW and Ford, the final such contract at the Big Three automakers.

== Legacy ==
A rebuilt overpass stands at Gate 4 of the Rouge plant, along Miller Road. It bears the logos of the United Auto Workers and the Ford Motor Company.

== See also ==
- Ford Strikers Riot
