= R. J. Thomas =

American trade unionist (1900–1967)

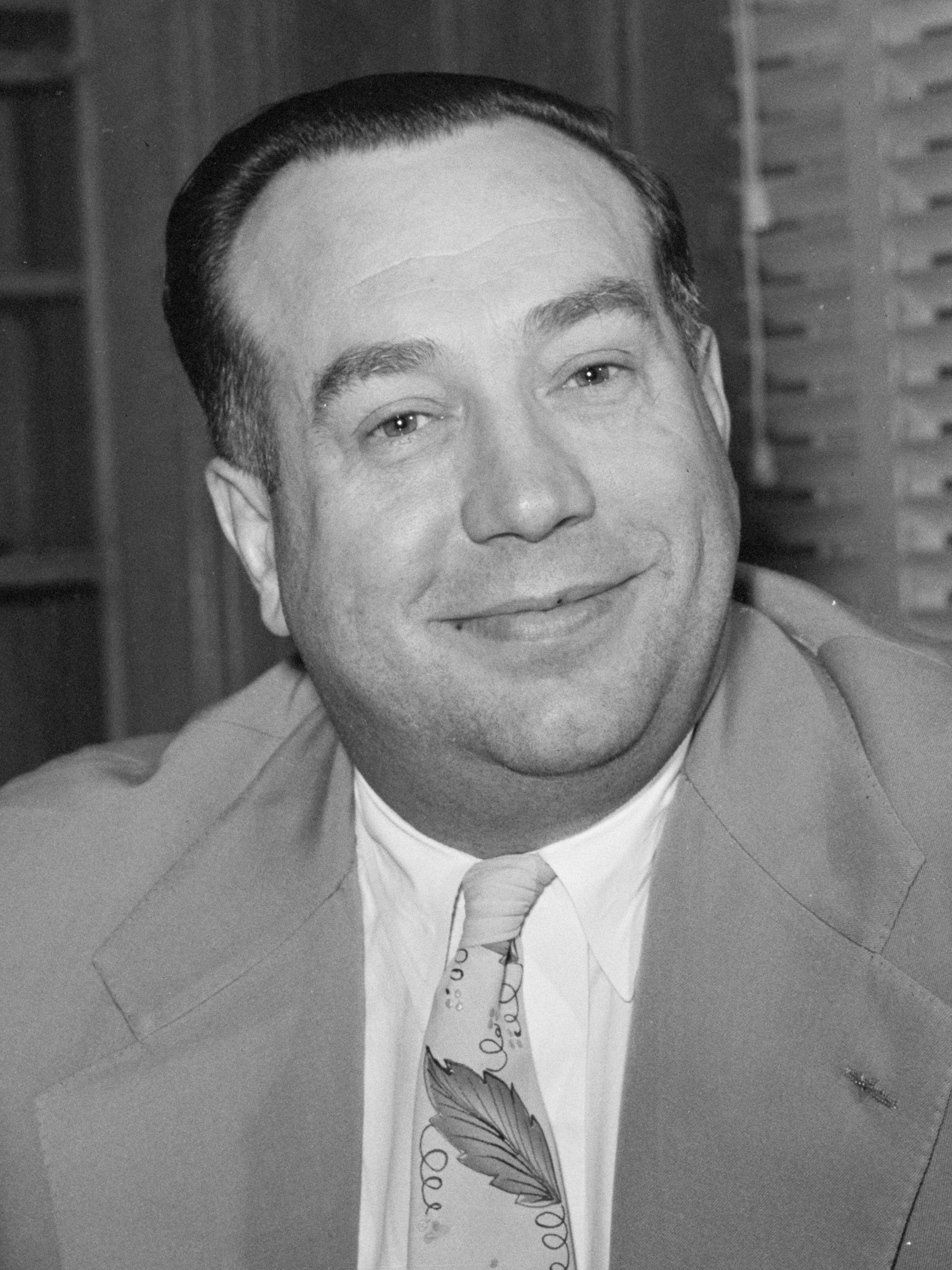
- Thomas in 1942

3rd President of the United Auto Workers
- In office January 20, 1939 – March 27, 1946
- Preceded by: Homer Martin
- Succeeded by: Walter Reuther

Personal details
- Born: Roland Jay Thomas; June 9, 1900 East Palestine, Ohio, U.S.
- Died: April 18, 1967 (aged 66) Muskegon, Michigan, U.S.
- Spouse: Mildred Wettergren (m. 1937)
- Children: 1 (Frank)
- Education: College of Wooster

Roland Jay Thomas (June 9, 1900 – April 18, 1967) was an American leader of organized labor who served as the third president of the United Auto Workers from 1939 to 1946.

== Early life ==
Thomas was born in East Palestine, Ohio, on June 9, 1900. He attended the College of Wooster for two years before moving to Detroit in 1923, where he worked in several automobile plants.

== United Automobile Workers ==
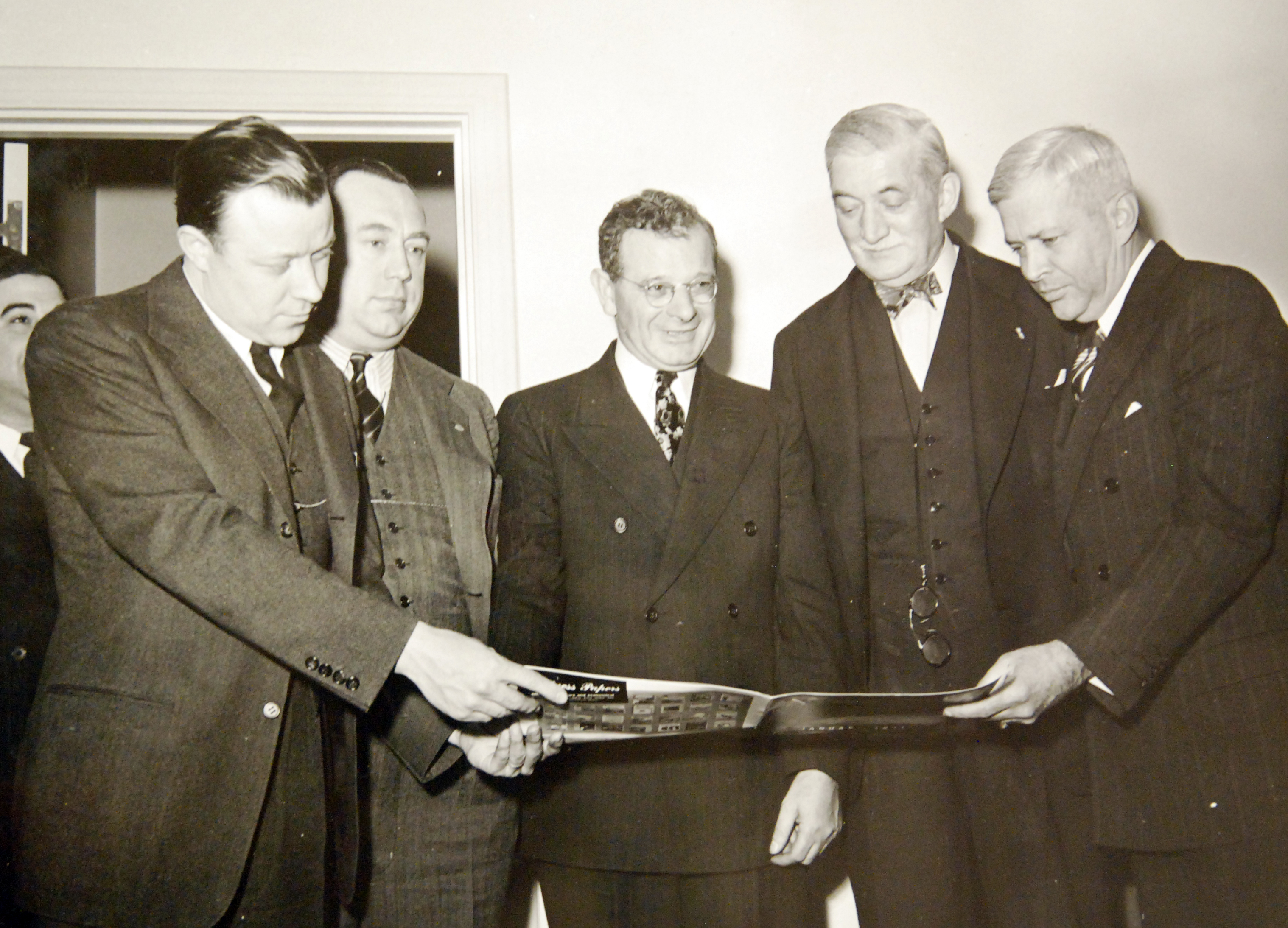
Thomas at a 1942 meeting of auto leaders. Pictured (from left) are Walter Reuther, Thomas, Sidney Hillman, William S. Knudsen and Charles Erwin Wilson.

Thomas became active in efforts to organize the automobile industry and was the president of Chrysler Local 7 when it affiliated with the United Auto Workers (UAW) in 1936. He was a leader of the 1937 Chrysler sit-down strike and that same year was elected a vice president of the UAW.

He assumed the presidency in 1938 after the president, Homer Martin was ousted, and he was president until 1946. During this period, the UAW developed into a dynamic, stable union. In 1945, he attended the World Trade Union Conference in London alongside many renowned trade unionists. Thomas lost the presidency to Walter Reuther in 1946 by a margin of 124 out of almost 9,000 votes cast, but was elected first vice president.

Within the UAW, Thomas had led a Communist Party USA-affiliated faction that supported the Soviet Union, while Reuther led a liberal and progressive faction that opposed the Soviet Union. During World War II and until 1946, communists had outnumbered liberals in the UAW Executive Committee; but by 1947, as U.S.-Soviet tensions grew, workers' support of the communists waned. A series of bitter internal disputes led to Thomas losing the office of the vice presidency in the following year's election, with most of the leading Communists replaced, in what became known as "the biggest setback of all time for the Communists in the American Labor Movement."

After his defeat in 1947, Thomas was named assistant to Congress of Industrial Organizations (CIO) president Philip Murray. With the merger of the American Federation of Labor and CIO in 1955, he served under George Meany until his retirement in 1964 due to ill health.

== Personal life ==
He was married to Mildred Wettergren on August 7, 1937, and they had one child, Frank. Thomas died in Muskegon, Michigan, on April 18, 1967.

Trade union offices
Preceded by Homer Martin	President of the United Auto Workers; 1938–1946	Succeeded by Walter Reuther
