= Walter Reuther =

American labor union leader and progressive activist (1907–1970)

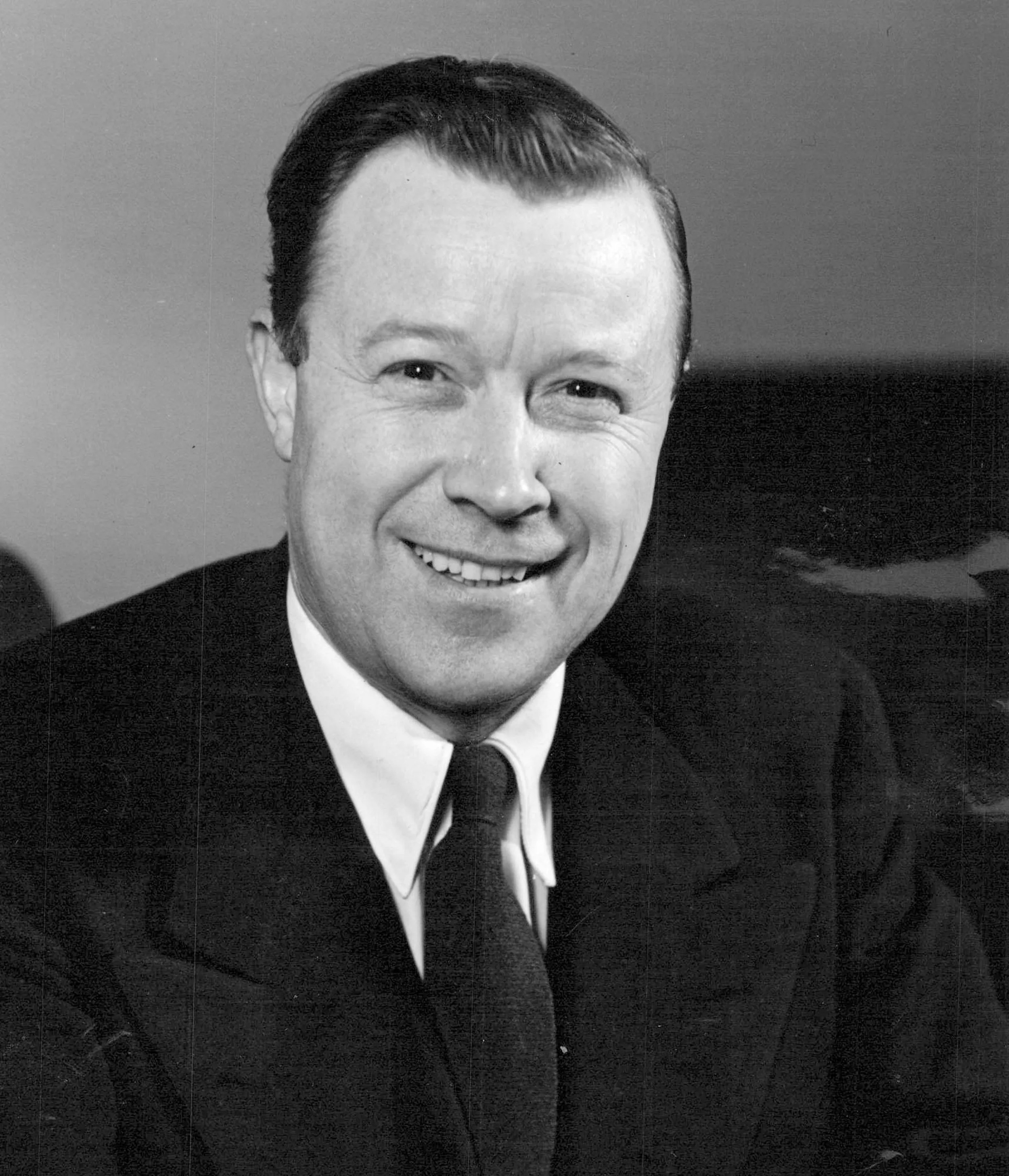
- Official portrait, 1955

4th President of the United Auto Workers
- In office March 27, 1946 – May 9, 1970
- Preceded by: R.J. Thomas
- Succeeded by: Leonard F. Woodcock

3rd President of the Congress of Industrial Organizations
- In office November 9, 1952 – December 4, 1955
- Preceded by: Philip Murray
- Succeeded by: George Meany

Personal details
- Born: Walter Philip Reuther; September 1, 1907 Wheeling, West Virginia, U.S.
- Died: May 9, 1970 (aged 62) Pellston, Michigan, U.S.
- Party: Socialist (before 1938); Democratic (1938–1970)
- Other political affiliations: Communist (disputed)
- Spouse: May Wolf (m. 1936)
- Children: 2
- Relatives: Victor G. Reuther; Roy Reuther
- Education: Wayne State University (incomplete)
- Awards: Presidential Medal of Freedom (posthumous); Weizmann Award; Eugene V. Debs Award; Labor Hall of Honor; Automotive Hall of Fame

Walter Philip Reuther (/ˈruːθər/ ROOTH-er; September 1, 1907 – May 9, 1970) was an American leader of organized labor and civil rights activist who built the United Automobile Workers (UAW) into one of the most progressive labor unions in American history. He considered labor movements not as narrow special interest groups but as instruments to advance social justice and human rights in democratic societies. He leveraged the UAW's resources and influence to advocate for workers' rights, civil rights, women's rights, universal health care, public education, affordable housing, environmental stewardship, profit-sharing for employees, and nuclear nonproliferation around the world. He believed in Swedish-style social democracy and societal change through nonviolent civil disobedience. He cofounded the AFL-CIO in 1955 with George Meany. He survived two attempted assassinations, including one at home where he was struck by a 12-gauge shotgun blast fired through his kitchen window. He was the fourth and longest serving president of the UAW, serving from 1946 until his death in 1970.

As the leader of five million autoworkers, including retirees and their families, Reuther was influential inside the Democratic Party. Following the Bay of Pigs in 1961, President John F. Kennedy sent Reuther to Cuba to negotiate a prisoner exchange with Fidel Castro. He was instrumental in spearheading the creation of the Peace Corps and in marshaling support for the Civil Rights Act of 1964, the Voting Rights Act of 1965, Medicare and Medicaid, and the Fair Housing Act. He met weekly in 1964 and 1965 with President Lyndon B. Johnson at the White House to discuss policies and legislation for the Great Society and War on Poverty. The Republican Party was wary of Reuther, leading presidential candidate Richard Nixon to say about John F. Kennedy during the 1960 election, "I can think of nothing so detrimental to this nation than for any President to owe his election to, and therefore be a captive of, a political boss like Walter Reuther." Conservative politician Barry Goldwater declared that Reuther "was more dangerous to our country than Sputnik or anything Soviet Russia might do."

A powerful ally of Martin Luther King Jr. and the civil rights movement, Reuther marched with King in Detroit, Selma, Birmingham, Montgomery, and Jackson. When King and others including children were jailed in Birmingham, Alabama, and King authored his famous Letter from Birmingham Jail, Reuther arranged $160,000 for the protestors' release. He also helped organize and finance the March on Washington on August 28, 1963, delivering remarks from the steps of the Lincoln Memorial shortly before King gave his historic "I Have a Dream" speech on the National Mall. An early supporter of Cesar Chavez and the United Farm Workers, he asked Robert F. Kennedy to visit and support Chavez. He served on the board of directors for the National Association for the Advancement of Colored People (NAACP) and was one of the founders of Americans for Democratic Action. A lifelong environmentalist, Reuther played a critical role in funding and organizing the first Earth Day on April 22, 1970 and he died weeks later in a plane accident at age 62. According to Denis Hayes, the principal national organizer of the first Earth Day, "Without the UAW, the first Earth Day would have likely flopped!"

Reuther was recognized by Time Magazine as one of the 100 most influential people of the 20th century. He was posthumously awarded the Presidential Medal of Freedom in 1995 by President Bill Clinton, who remarked at the ceremony, "Walter Reuther was an American visionary so far ahead of his times that although he died a quarter of a century ago, our Nation has yet to catch up to his dreams."

== Early life, education, and beliefs ==
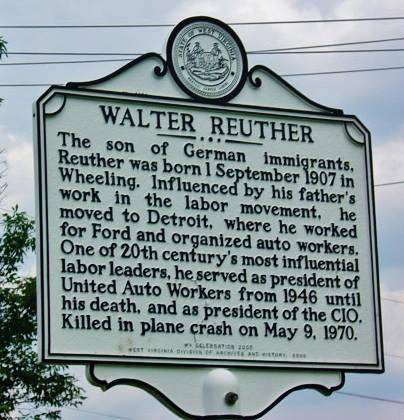
Sign in Reuther's hometown of Wheeling, West Virginia

Reuther was born on September 1, 1907, in Wheeling, West Virginia, to Valentine and Anna (née Stocker) Reuther, who were German-Americans. His father Valentine was a horse-drawn beer wagon driver and Socialist union organizer who at age 11 had emigrated from Germany. Walter was one of five children, who were, from the oldest to the youngest, Ted, Walter, Roy, Victor, Christine. Valentine would facilitate debates every Sunday for his sons, training them to think on their feet about social issues of the day such as yellow journalism, child labor, women's suffrage, and civil rights. Reuther later recalled, "At my father's knee we learned the philosophy of trade unionism. We got the struggles, the hopes and the aspirations of working people every day." As a child, he and Victor accompanied their father on a visit to a jail to meet Eugene V. Debs, who was being incarcerated for his pacifism during World War I.

The Reuthers were frugal and learned not to waste. To save money, Walter's mother Anna would make underwear for her sons out of used flour sacks. When Valentine was partially blinded by an exploding bottle, Walter began doing odd jobs to bring in family income at the age of nine. He later dropped out of high school during his junior year and worked in a local factory to help support the family. He learned firsthand about inadequate worker safety when a 400-pound die that he and three other men were lifting fell and severed his big toe.

From an early age, the Reuther boys received lessons on racism. One day they saw local boys throwing rocks at black people being transported north through their hometown in open railway cars. Their father gave them a stern warning to never treat another human being like that. The Reuther boys never forgot that lesson, spending the rest of their lives fighting for racial and economic equality for all people.

=== Left home for Detroit ===
In 1927, at the age of 19, Reuther left Wheeling for Detroit and argued himself into an expert tool and die maker job at Ford Motor Company that required 25 years experience. The foreman was baffled that at his young age he could read blueprints and dies, becoming one of the highest paid mechanics in the factory. He finished high school while working at Ford and enrolled at Detroit City College, which is today known as Wayne State University. In 1932, he was fired for organizing a rally for Norman Thomas who was running for President of the United States as the nominee for the Socialist Party of America. His official Ford employment record states that he quit voluntarily, but Reuther himself maintained that he was fired for his increasingly visible socialist activities. Walter and Victor decided it was time for the European trip they had discussed from childhood.

=== World tour ===
When Henry Ford retired the Model T in 1927, he sold the production mechanisms to the Soviet Union, and American workers who knew how to operate the equipment were needed. Walter and Victor were promised work teaching Soviet workers how to run the machines and assembly line. With that employment assurance, the brothers embarked on a three-year adventure, first bicycling through Europe, then working in the auto plant in Gorky, in the Soviet Union, where the unheated factories were often 30–40 degrees Fahrenheit below zero. He frequently wrote letters to the Moscow Daily News criticizing the many inefficiencies associated with how the communists operated the plants.

After almost two years in the Soviet Union, the brothers travelled through Turkey, Iran, British India, and China. After crossing the East China Sea, they finished their Far East tour by bicycling throughout Japan. Finally, after being gone from home for almost three years, they found work for passage on the steamship SS President Harding to San Francisco and hurried back to Detroit where their brother Roy was already deeply involved with organizing autoworkers. Walter later stated the world tour taught him that "all people long for the same basic human goals of a job with some degree of security, greater opportunity for their children, and of course, freedom. We felt we could make a contribution by helping American workers build strong and democratic labor unions. That's why we went into the labor movement."

=== Political affiliation ===
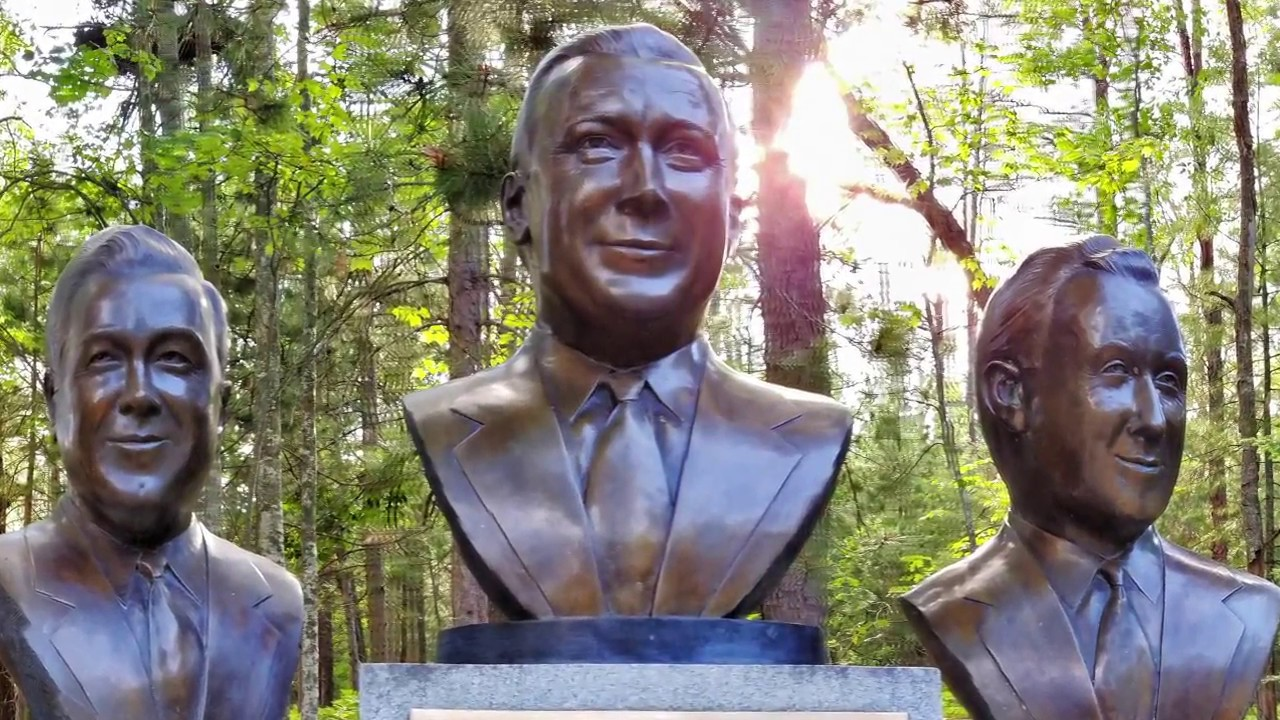
The Reuther brothers' busts at the Walter and May Reuther UAW Family Education Center in northern Michigan. From left to right, Roy Reuther, Walter Reuther, and Victor Reuther.

Before joining the Democratic Party, Reuther was a member of the Socialist Party of America. Although Reuther always denied it, some, including J. Edgar Hoover, have suspected that at one time he was a member of the Communist Party. On this subject, Reuther said in 1938, "I am not and never have been a member of the Communist Party nor a supporter of its policies nor subject to its control or influence in any way." Nevertheless, people have suspected that he may have paid dues to the Communist Party for some months in 1935–36, and one source listed him as attending a Communist Party planning meeting as late as February 1939. Reuther did cooperate with the Communists in the mid-1930s; this was the period of the Popular Front, and the Communist Party agreed with him on internal issues of the UAW; but his associations were with anti-Stalinist Socialists. Reuther remained active in the Socialist Party and in 1937 failed in his attempt to be elected to the Detroit City Council when the AFL and blacks opposed his CIO ticket. (Historian Martin Glaberman found proof of Reuther's less-than-one-year CPUSA membership in the papers of UAW activist Nat Ganley.) However, impressed by the efforts by President Franklin D. Roosevelt to tackle inequality, he eventually joined the Democratic Party.

== United Automobile Workers (UAW) ==
=== First victory against automobile companies ===
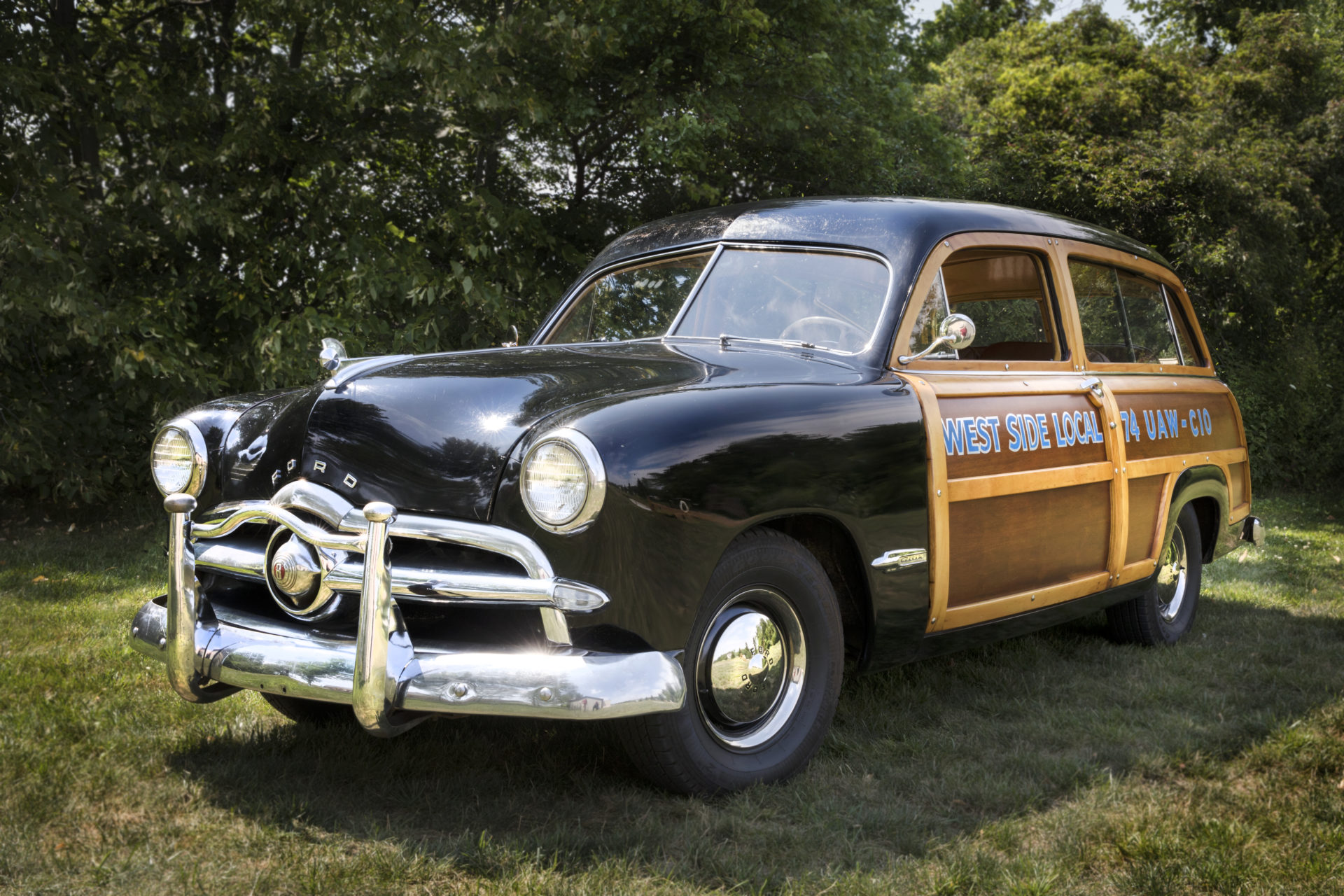
Sound car for West Side Local 174 used by Walter Reuther to organize UAW members

Upon returning from Europe to Detroit, Reuther hitchhiked to South Bend, Indiana, to attend the second annual convention as a delegate of the fledgling UAW. Upon his return he became president of newly formed Local 174 on Detroit's west side and with brother Victor, led the first successful strike against the automotive giants at Kelsey Hayes, which supplied brake drums and wheels to Ford Motor Company. The main complaint was the speed-up of the assembly line was intolerable. Workers were losing limbs and even their own lives trying in vain to keep up with the ever-increasing speed of the assembly line. It was December 1936 when the workers pulled a surprise strike and sat down in the plant refusing to leave until management negotiated with their representative, Walter Reuther.

When management tried to enter the plant to remove the machinery, thousands of sympathizers swarmed the sidewalks and blocked the doorways. Ford needed those brake drums and wheels badly and after 10 days of striking the sides settled. The first major UAW victory to unionize the auto factories was won. Upon Reuther's insistence, women won equal pay for equal work: 75 cents an hour. The speed-up of the assembly line was slowed down and the company could not fire a worker for joining the union. UAW Local 174's membership expanded from 200 before the strike to 35,000 within the next year.

=== General Motors ===
Interstate 696 in Detroit was named the Walter P. Reuther Freeway following the plane crash in 1970

In 1936, General Motors (GM) was the largest corporation in the world and held many plants in Flint, Michigan, about 60 miles north of Detroit. Reuther's brother, Roy, was already in Flint drawing up strategy plans and organizing workers to shut down the automaker until it would recognize the rights of the workers to unionize. The strike began on New Year's Eve, December 31, 1936, when the workers sat down in the plants and refused to leave. General Motors retaliated by turning off the heat in the plant.

In solidarity with the Flint strikers, Reuther led a strike at Detroit's Fleetwood Plant, where bodies were made for GM's luxury vehicle, the Cadillac. Support strikes were also called in Oakland, California; Pontiac, Michigan; and St. Louis, Missouri. Autoworkers around the nation engaged in action in support of the Flint sit-down strikers.

Back in Flint, the police tried to force the workers out of the plant in what became known as the "Battle of Bulls Run." Over a hundred policemen attacked the pickets with tear gas and bullets, sending thirteen workers to the hospital with gunshot wounds. Victor manned the sound car and encouraged the workers to fight back, which they did by sling-shotting door hinges from the factory roof and turning fire hoses on the police in the 16-degree Fahrenheit winter night. Victor and Genora Johnson, a leader of the Women's Brigade, took turns in the sound car exhorting the workers to stand their ground.

Michigan Governor Frank Murphy called in 2,000 members of the National Guard, not to force the workers out of the plants, but to keep the peace. After a brilliant move, the workers were able to gain control of the only plant in the country that made Chevrolet engines. Finally, 44 days later, General Motors was forced to recognize the workers' right to unionize and signed its first collective bargaining agreement with the fledgling UAW.

The Flint sit-down strike has become known as the Lexington and Valley Forge of American industrial unionism. Roy recalled, "When the boys came out of the plants, I never saw a night like that and perhaps will never see it again. I liken it to a country experiencing independence, families reunited for the first time since the strike began, kids hanging onto daddy with tears of joy and happiness. It was a sea of humanity in which fears were no longer on the minds of the workers."

In 1950, Reuther negotiated and signed with Charlie Wilson, chief executive officer of General Motors, the Treaty of Detroit, an historic five-year labor contract that, in exchange for a commitment not to strike, gave rank-and-file workers better wages, health care, and pensions. At the time, Fortune Magazine wrote that the Treaty of Detroit “made the worker to an amazing degree a middle class member of a middle class society.”

=== Chrysler ===
Chrysler was next on the list of the young UAW. In March 1937, 60,000 Chrysler workers went on strike. When police started roughing up pickets and strikers, over 150,000 citizens gathered at Detroit's downtown Cadillac Square where Reuther and others led them in protest. After a four-week strike, Chrysler followed General Motors’ lead and negotiated its first collective bargaining agreement with the UAW.

=== Ford Motor Company ===
Henry Ford had stated that he would never allow his workers to unionize. His main enforcer was Harry Bennett, who led a 3,000-man Security Department for Ford Motor Company, whose mandate was to intimidate, beat, and fire any worker who showed signs of favoring unionization. In 1932, when workers marched out of the giant Ford River Rouge Complex in protest of the speed-up of the assembly lines, they were attacked by Bennett's armed men; five workers were shot dead and hundreds suffered injuries.

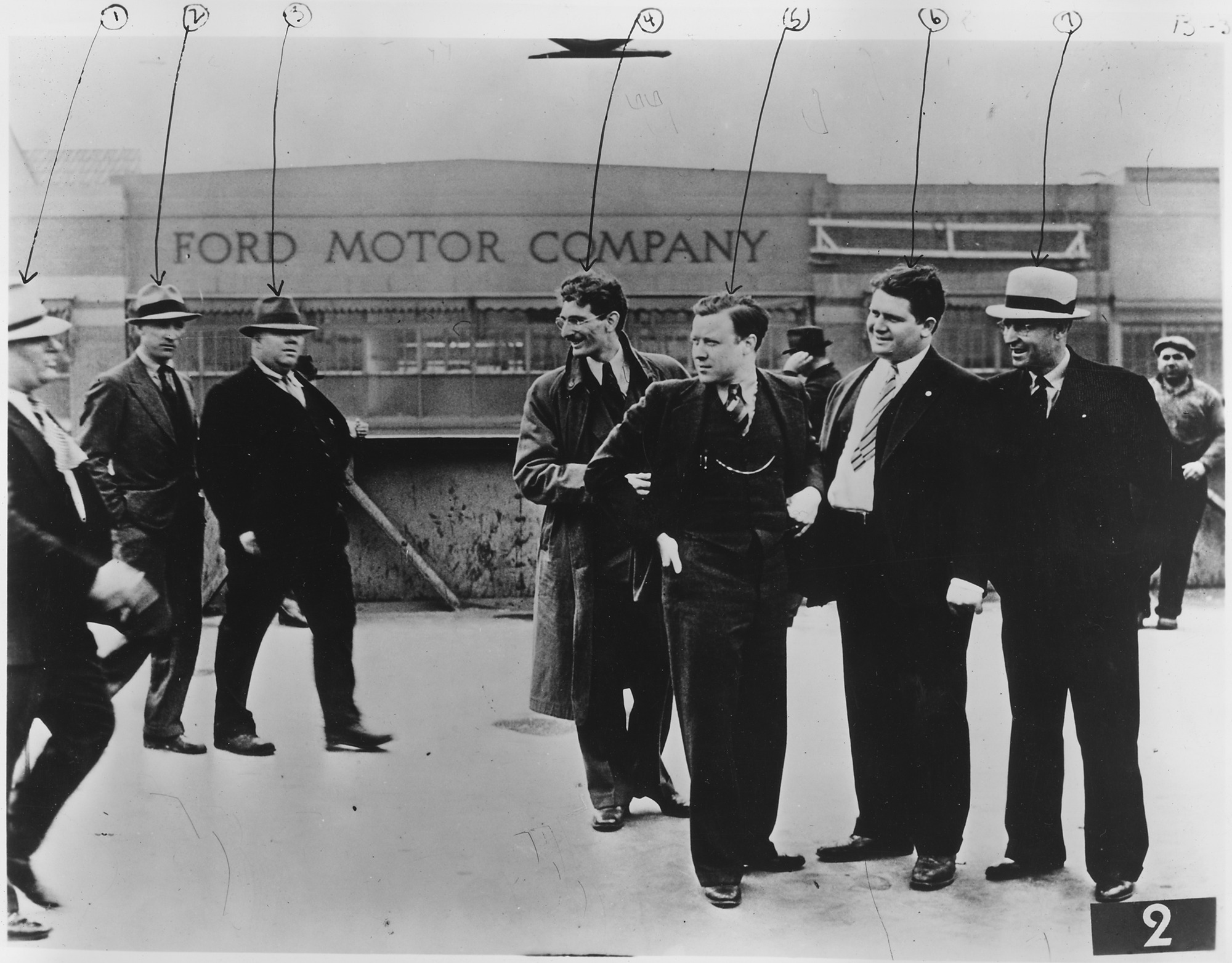
Battle of the Overpass, May 26, 1937, Walter Reuther fifth from left, Richard Frankensteen sixth from left

Barely a month after the Chrysler signing, Reuther got permission from the City of Dearborn to pass out handbills titled, "Unionism, not Fordism" on public property at Gate Four of the giant Ford River Rouge Complex. As he and three other UAW leaders climbed the stairs to the bridge, they were attacked by Bennett's "enforcers" who severely beat them.

Reuther was instantly surrounded by at least a dozen men, knocked to the ground, kicked and punched in the head and body, picked up four feet parallel to the ground then slammed to the concrete repeatedly, then thrown and kicked down three flights of stairs. The pummeling continued as four or five men beat him in and out of parked cars, until a streetcar arrived with union women to pass out leaflets and the thugs turned their attention to viciously attack them.

Press photographers were attacked as well and their cameras confiscated but one camera was inconspicuously thrown into a convertible and the next day, the "Battle of the Overpass," was national news.

The beatings taken by the union organizers in the long run hurt Henry Ford more, as national sentiment turned against him. Time magazine published the photographs with descriptions of how the union men and women were mercilessly beaten by Henry Ford's paid thugs. Ford retaliated against Time, Life, and Fortune magazines by withdrawing all advertising.

It took four more years, but finally, in 1941, Henry Ford signed his first agreement with the UAW. Shortly after, Henry Ford told Walter Reuther: "It was one of the most sensible things Harry Bennett ever did when he got the UAW into this plant." Reuther inquired, "What do you mean?" Ford replied, "Well, you've been fighting General Motors and the Wall Street crowd. Now you're in here and we've given you a union shop and more than you got out of them. That puts you on our side, doesn't it? We can fight General Motors and Wall Street together, eh?"

In the 1950s, Reuther and Henry Ford II, CEO of Ford, toured a state-of-the-art engine plant in Cleveland. As they walked about the plant, Ford gestured to the cutting-edge, automated machines, saying, "Walter, how are you going to get these robots to pay union dues?" Without missing a beat, Reuther famously replied: "Henry, how are you going to get them to buy your cars?"

=== "500 Planes a Day" ===
In 1940, in the midst of World War II, the United States was producing fighter planes to help the allies in their war against Hitler's aggression. The production was slow, inadequate, and threatening the security of the Allies. The US planned to construct new manufacturing plants specifically to produce more planes. That plan would have taken two years to begin production. The Allies did not have that time to spare. In response, Reuther proposed "to transform the entire unused capacity of the auto industry into one huge plane production unit capable of turning out 500 Planes a Day." After getting the support of workers, he publicly announced the "Reuther Plan: 500 Planes a Day," shortly before Christmas, 1940. He said, during a national radio address on December 28, 1940:

In London they are huddled in the subways praying for aid from America. In America we are huddled over blueprints praying that Hitler will be obliging enough to postpone an "all out" attack on England for another two years until new plants finally begin to turn out engines and aircraft. We believe that without disturbing present aircraft plant production schedules we can supplement them by turning out 500 planes a day of a single standard fighting model by the use of idle automotive capacity. . . . England's battles, it used to be said, were won on the playing fields of Eton. America's can be won on the assembly lines of Detroit. Give England planes and there will be no need to give her men.

A week after receiving the plan, on December 30, 1940, President Roosevelt wrote William S. Knudsen, chairman of the War Production Board, "It is well worthwhile to give a good deal of attention to this (Reuther) program." Three days later on January 2, 1941, Reuther met with President Roosevelt at the White House to discuss the possibility of implementing his plan for 500 Planes a Day.

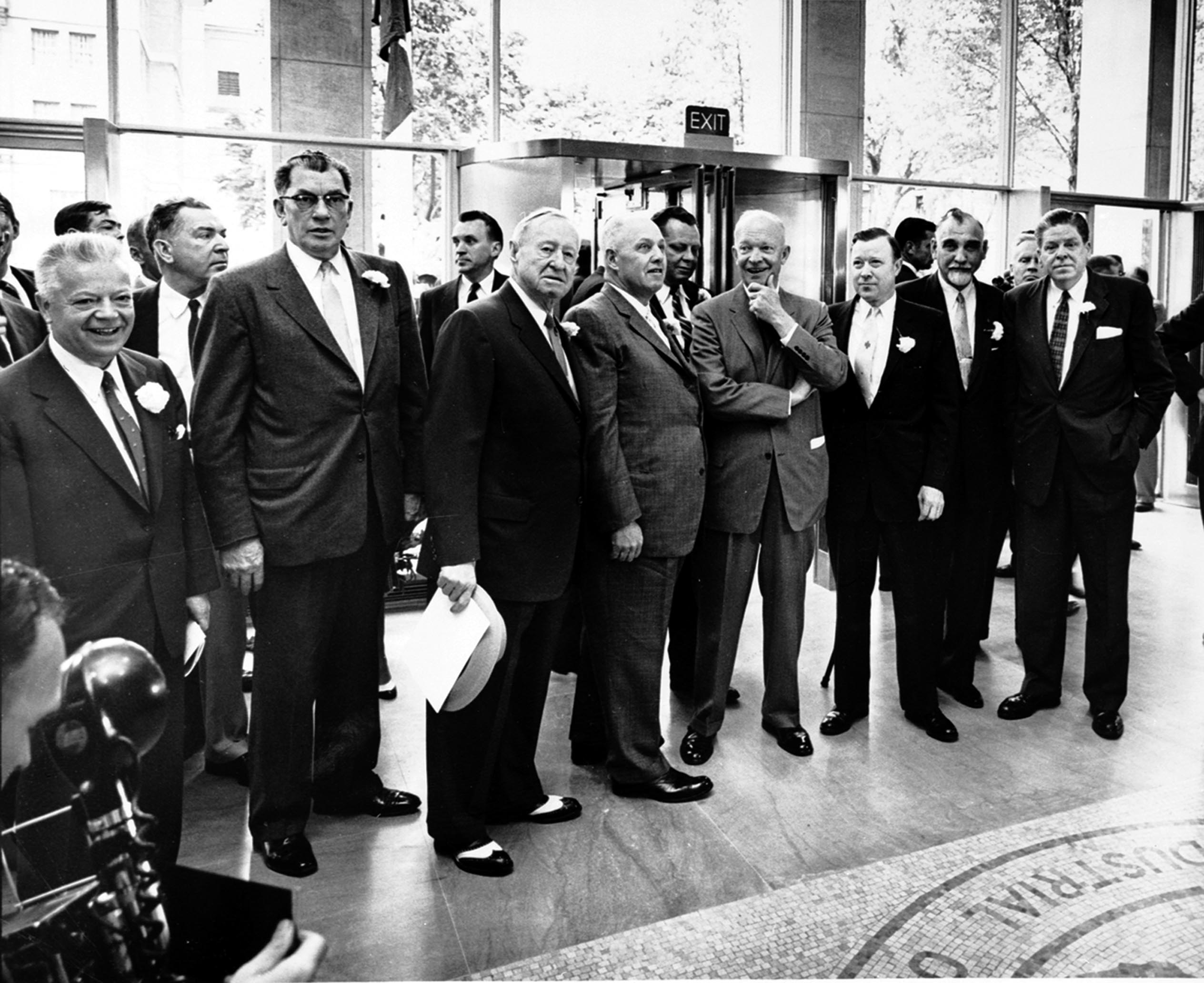
Reuther with President Dwight Eisenhower and other labor leaders at AFL-CIO building dedication, June 4, 1956

General Motors, Ford, and Chrysler all opposed the Reuther Plan. According to Reuther, management felt production was their exclusive domain, and wanted the government to build new plane and tank factories that could be sold to them at giveaway prices after the war. General Motors chairman Alfred P. Sloan argued that the idea was impractical, saying that "only about 10 to 15% of the machinery and equipment in an automobile factory can be utilized for the production of special defense material."

After the attack on Pearl Harbor on December 7, 1941, many of Reuther's proposals were implemented. Detroit's automobile plants produced planes and tanks in mass volume and became known as the center of the Arsenal of Democracy, which gave the Allies a decisive advantage to win the war. By 1943, Chrysler President, K. T. Keller, reported that his company had converted 89% of its machine tools to wartime production, leading Washington Post publisher, Phil Graham, to state that meant Reuther was 89% right. At the war's end, Fortune magazine wrote: "Reuther was right on track. Compared with many industrialists that sat back and hugged profits and the aimless agencies of Washington, the red-headed labor leader exhibited atomic spirit of action. He never let up." In 1953, President Eisenhower wrote in a letter to Reuther, "When I last addressed a CIO Convention, I came to thank you for your magnificent performance in World War II in supplying the planes and tanks and ships and arms. You did your job, and you did it well."

=== Elected UAW president ===
After the war ended in 1945, Reuther proved he would be a different type of labor leader when he led a strike challenging GM to increase workers wages by 30% without increasing the price of their new cars. Worker pay had been restricted during World War II and Reuther sought to get them a raise but not at the cost of increased inflation. Historically, when workers won a pay increase, the company would pass on the expense to their consumers. GM refused the pay increase and after a 113 day strike, the sides settled on an eighteen and a half cent hourly raise. Reuther's bold collective bargaining leadership in this strike catapulted him into the union's top position.

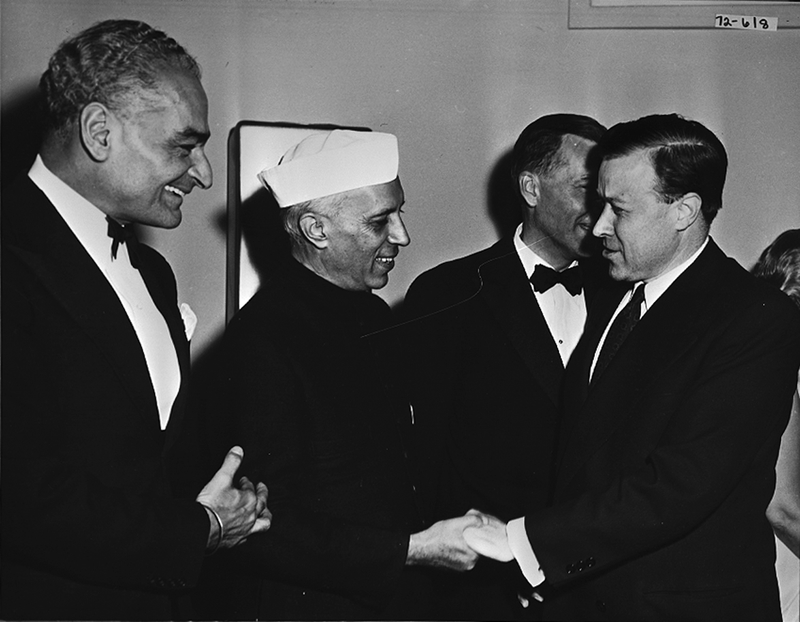
Walter Reuther meeting with Jawaharlal Nehru, Prime Minister of India, in October 1949

On March 27, 1946, Reuther won the election and became the president of the UAW in a very close race, defeating incumbent UAW president R. J. Thomas by a mere 124 votes, out of almost 9,000 cast. The new UAW president pledged his vision of "a labor movement whose philosophy is to fight for the welfare of the public at large." One of his first acts as president was to fight to integrate the American Bowling League, which had previously excluded black bowlers. He was a new kind of leader who viewed the labor movement as "an instrument for social change."

==== Salary ====
Although presidents of much smaller unions were making 3 or 4 times his salary, Reuther purposely kept his salary low to stay in touch, and show solidarity, with UAW members he represented. He never made an annual salary of more than $31,000. Author David Halberstam writes: "His life was not about material things. The constant success of the union was reward enough."

=== Expelling Communists from organized labor ===
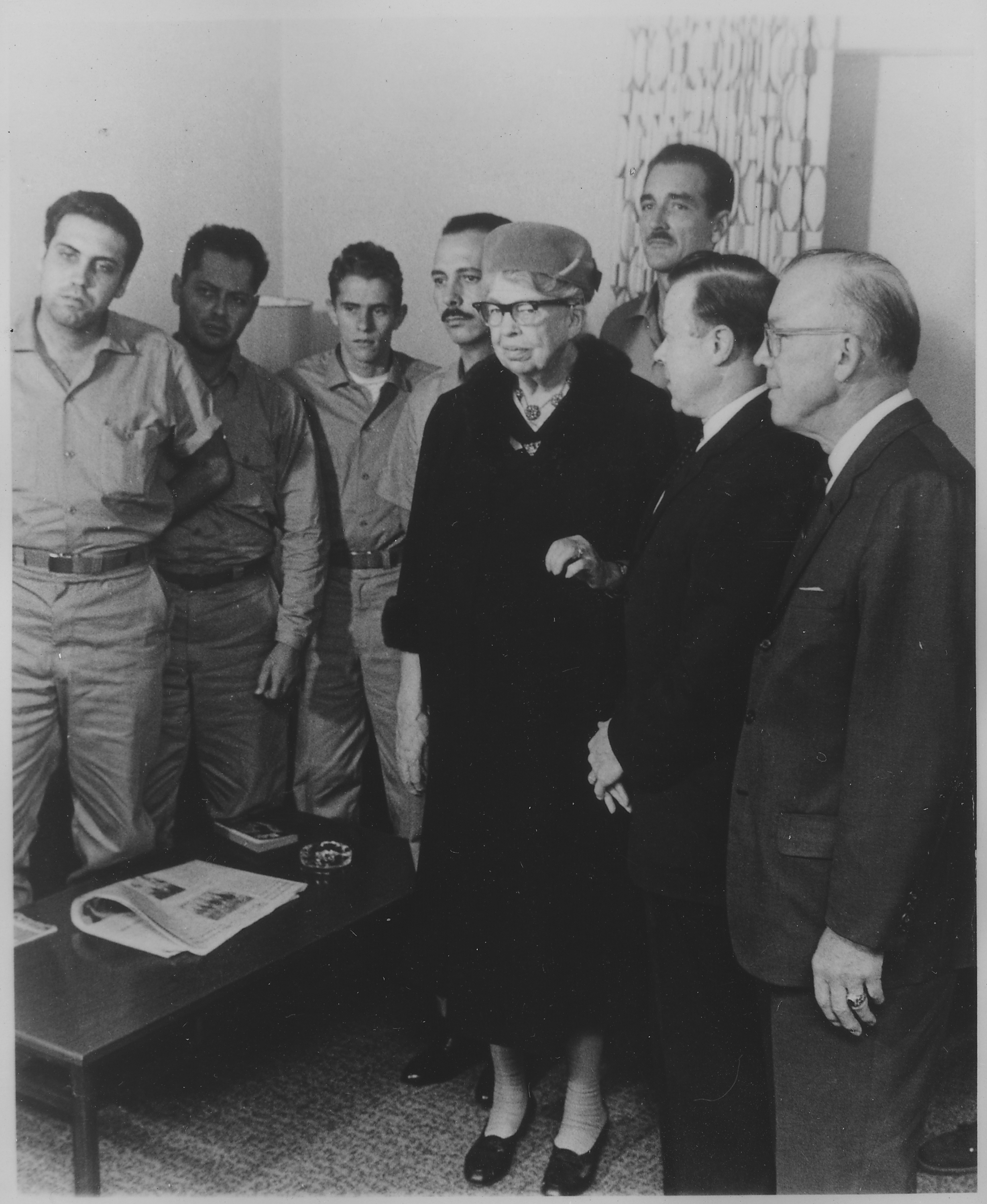
Eleanor Roosevelt, Walter Reuther, Milton Eisenhower and the Cuban prisoner exchange delegation in Washington, D.C.

The following 18 months after Reuther's election win, bitter battles erupted inside the UAW as Communist-backers of R. J. Thomas had a two-thirds majority on the UAW's Executive Board. One observer noted, "The Commies threw everything but their hammer and sickle at Walter." In November 1947, at the next UAW national convention, this time Reuther won the election overwhelmingly, severely weakening the Communist's hold on the union's leadership. Life magazine reported that Reuther's victory was "the biggest setback of all time for the Communists in the American Labor Movement."

=== President of Congress of Industrial Organizations (CIO) ===
Reuther became president of the CIO in 1952 until its merger with the AFL in 1955, and continued as head of the UAW until his death in 1970. As president of the CIO, Reuther sought to remove officers from Communist-dominated unions within the CIO, leading Hubert Humphrey to write, "Communist infiltration of the CIO was a direct threat to the survival of all of our country's democratic institutions. The CIO's victory over the Communist party was a significant victory for our nation." In response, Trud, a Soviet newspaper, called Reuther a "traitor and strikebreaker" and a favorite of the U.S. Chamber of Commerce. The Republican Party called Reuther "the most dangerous man in America and a Communist." Despite removing Communists from the labor movement, J. Edgar Hoover, Director of the Federal Bureau of Investigation, never stopped suspecting Reuther to be a Communist for working in Russia and having early associations with Communists.

In 1959, at the request of the Department of State, Reuther met with Soviet Premier Nikita Khrushchev, who was visiting the U.S. They discussed, among other things, capitalism versus communism, organized labor, and US-Russia relations. The meeting happened in San Francisco and was front-page international news.

=== Collective bargaining ===
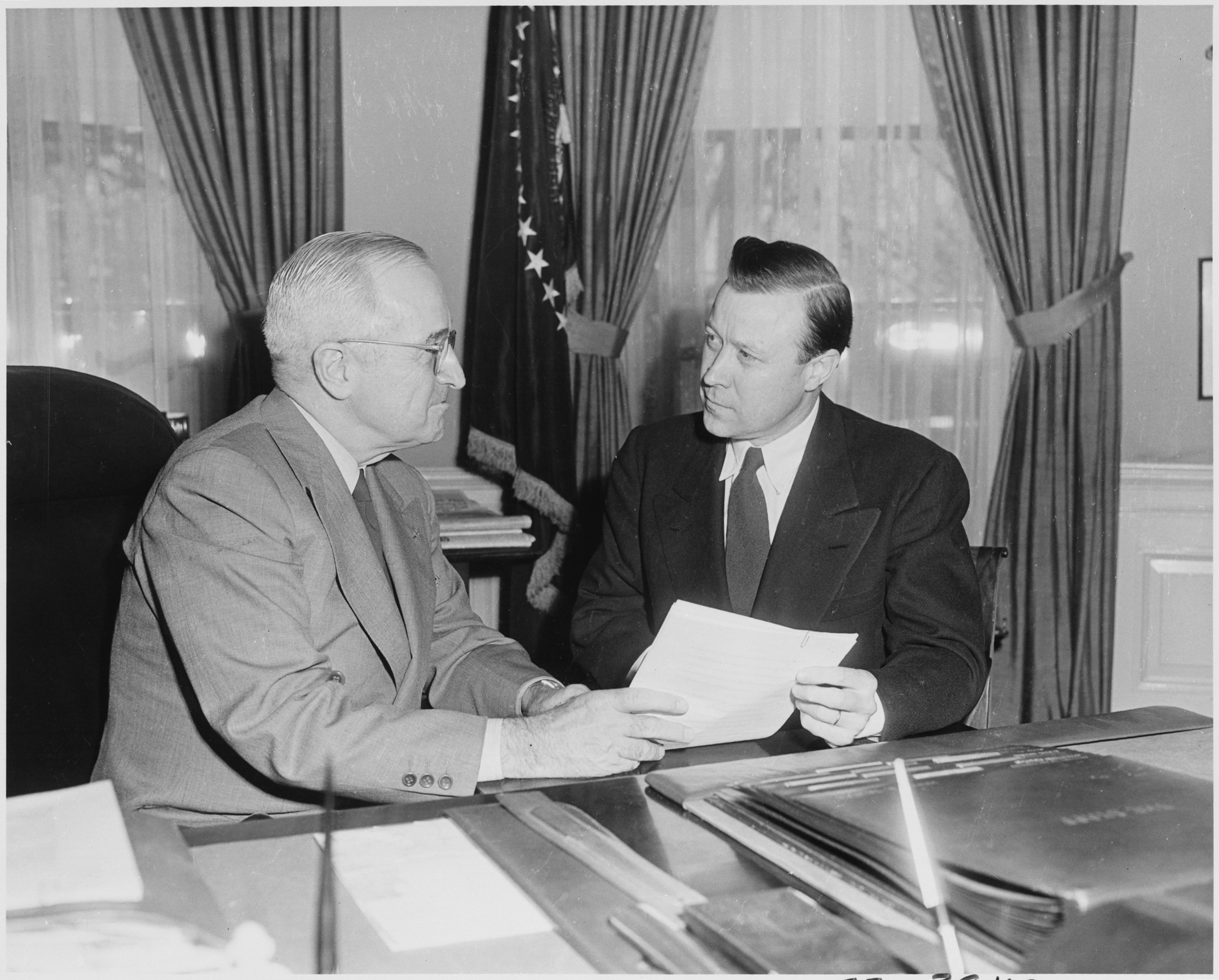
Walter Reuther with President Truman in the Oval Office, 1952

As president of the UAW, Reuther negotiated contracts that included unprecedented standard-of-living increases for automobile workers. Such increases include annual raises based on productivity advances, cost-of-living increases, supplementary unemployment benefits, early-retirement options, and health and welfare benefits.

He employed a strategy called "pattern bargaining" against the Big Three automobile manufacturers, General Motors, Ford Motor Company, and Chrysler. He would first target a company that seemed most likely to accept his bargaining objective. If that target company refused to offer concessions, Reuther would threaten a strike to halt production at its plants only while allowing production operations at its competitors' plants to go uninterrupted. As a result, the target company would accept Reuther's demands to prevent its competitors from absorbing its sales and market share. Once he secured the initial agreement, he would use it as a pattern against the other automobile companies, threatening to strike if they too did not match the same terms to which the initial target company agreed. Reuther employed pattern bargaining to leverage competition among automobile manufacturers, maximize the influence of labor, and reduce the frequency of costly strikes.

== Ideas, activism, and political stances ==
=== Peace Corps ===
In 1950, Reuther proposed, in an article titled, "A Proposal for a Total Peace Offensive", that the United States establish a voluntary agency for young Americans to be sent around the world to fulfill humanitarian and development objectives. Subsequently, throughout the 1950s, Reuther gave speeches to the following effect:

I have been saying for a long time that I believe the more young Americans who are trained to join with other young people in the world to be sent abroad with slide rule, textbook, and medical kit to help people help themselves with the tools of peace, the fewer young people will need to be sent with guns and weapons of war.

In August 1960, following the 1960 Democratic National Convention, Walter Reuther visited John F. Kennedy at the Kennedy compound in Hyannisport to discuss Kennedy's platform and staffing of a future administration. It was there that Reuther got Kennedy to commit to creating the executive agency that would become the Peace Corps. Under Reuther's leadership, the United Auto Workers had earlier that summer put together a policy platform that included a "youth peace corps" to be sent to developing nations. Subsequently, at the urging of Reuther, John F. Kennedy announced the idea for such an organization on October 14, 1960, at a late-night campaign speech at the University of Michigan.

=== Civil rights activism ===
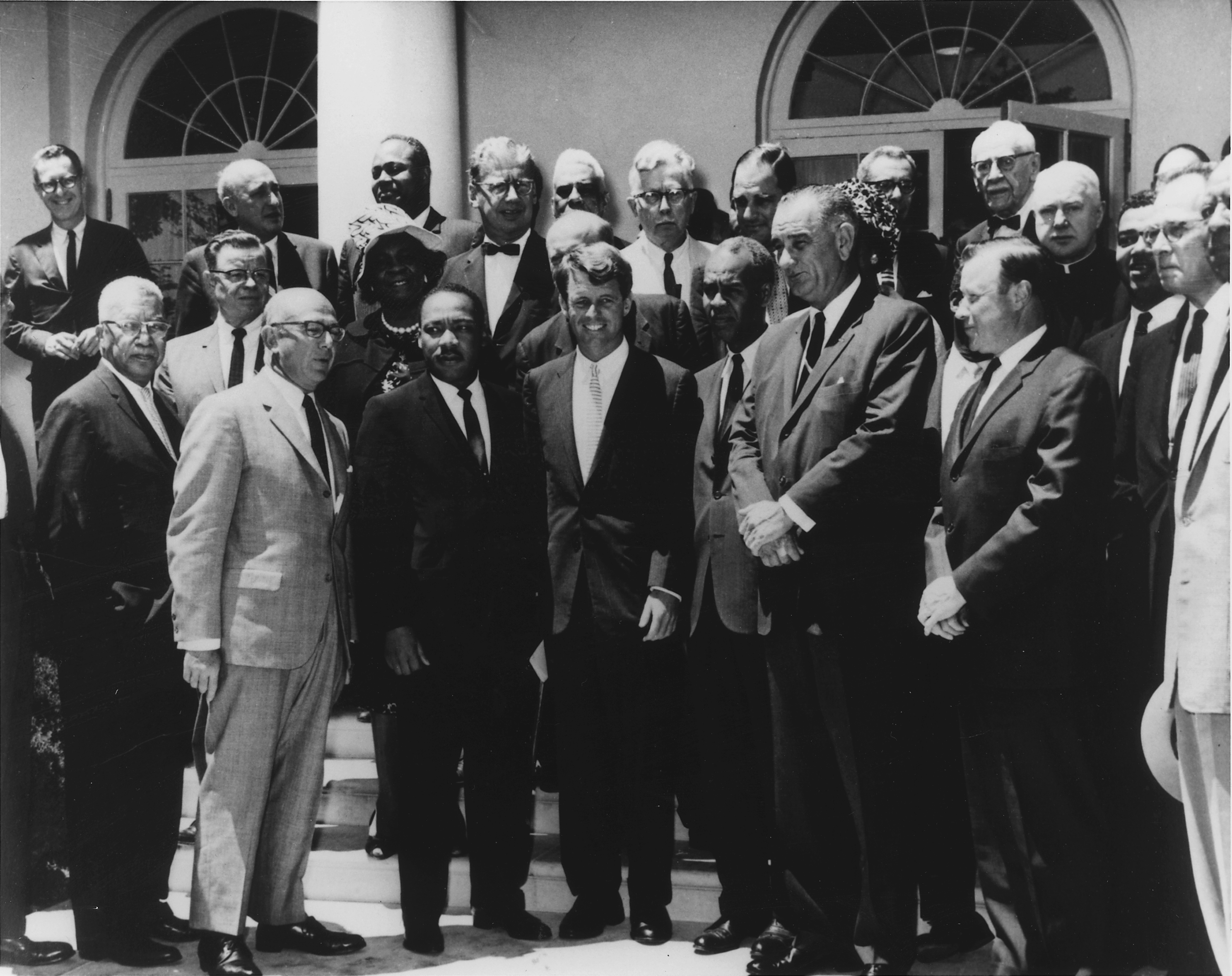
Civil rights leaders with Vice President Johnson and Attorney General Robert Kennedy at the White House on June 22, 1963

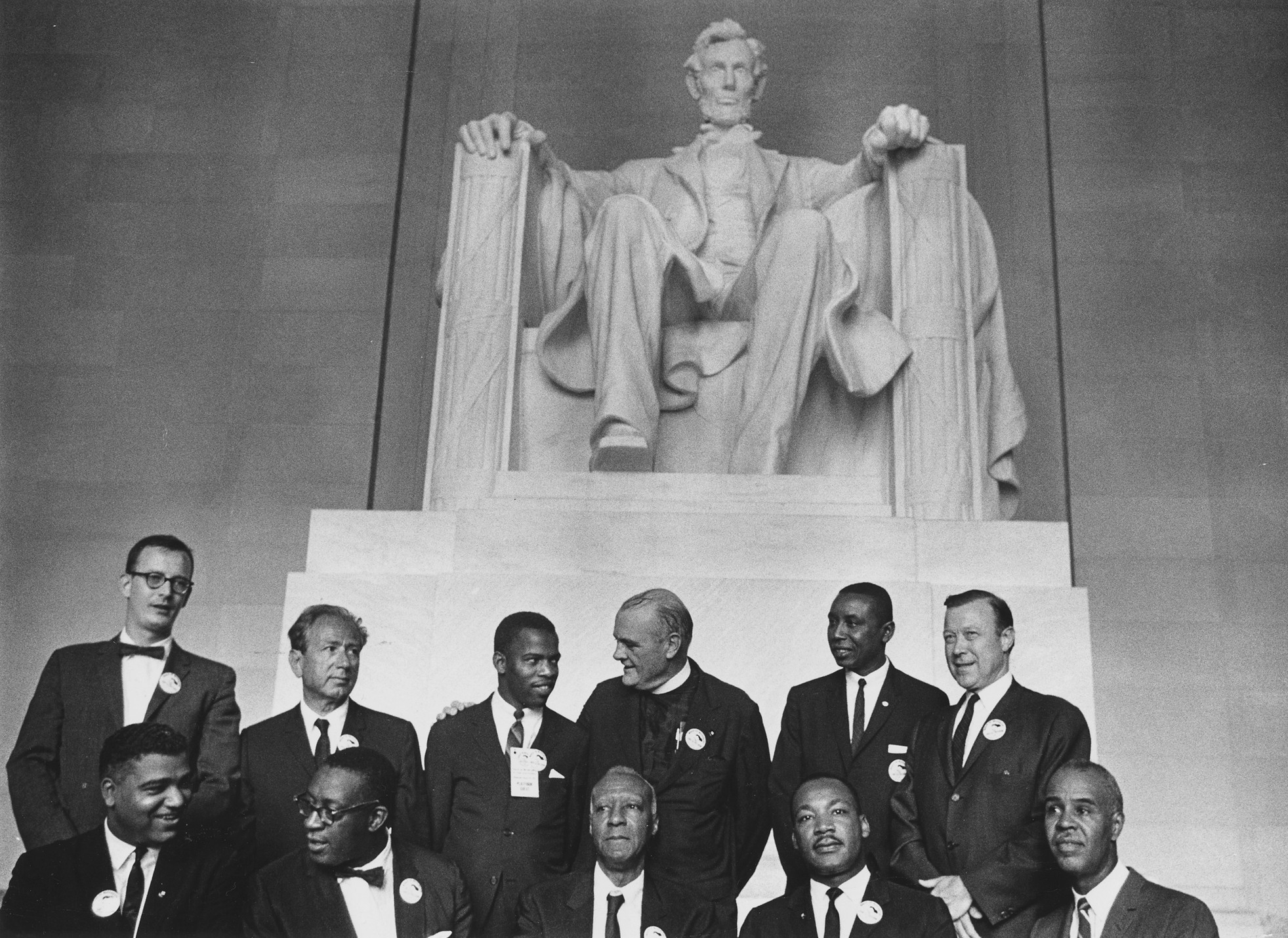
Leaders of the March on Washington posing in front of the statue of Abraham Lincoln on August 28, 1963

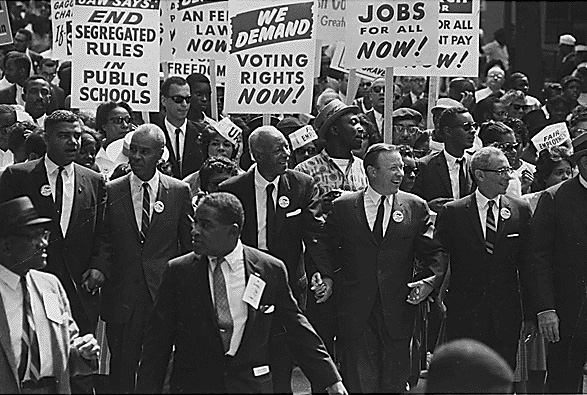
Leaders of the March on Washington on August 28, 1963

Reuther was a strong supporter of the Civil Rights Movement. He marched with Martin Luther King, Jr. in Selma, Birmingham, Montgomery, and Jackson and when King and others were jailed in Birmingham, Alabama, and King authored his famous Letter from Birmingham Jail, Reuther arranged $160,000 for the protestors' release. He also helped organize and finance the March on Washington on August 28, 1963, delivering remarks from the steps of the Lincoln Memorial shortly before King gave his historic "I Have a Dream" speech. He served on the board of directors for the National Association for the Advancement of Colored People (NAACP). Under his leadership, the UAW donated $75,000 in 1954 to help underwrite the NAACP's efforts—led by Thurgood Marshall—before the Supreme Court in the landmark case of Brown v. Board of Education. According to King, Reuther sent letters to all of his local unions in 1957, requesting members to attend and provide financial support to the Prayer Pilgrimage for Freedom in Washington, D.C. On the 25th anniversary of the UAW, King wrote a letter to Reuther, congratulating him on his successes and observing:

More than anyone else in America, you stand out as the shining symbol of democratic trade unionism. Through trials, efforts and your unswerving devotion to humanitarian causes, you have made life more meaningful for millions of working people. Through moments of difficulty and strong obstacles, you have stood firm for what you believe, knowing that in the long run 'Truth crushed to earth will rise again.' As I have heard you say, the true measure of a man is where he stands in moments of challenge and controversy, when the only consolation he gains is the quiet whisper of an inner voice saying there are things so eternally true and significant that they are worth dying for, if necessary. You have demonstrated over the years that you can stand up in moments of challenge and controversy. One day all of America will be proud of your achievements, and will record your work as one of the glowing epics of our heritage.

In the early 1930s, Reuther first challenged racism as a student at what is now Wayne State University. When a local hotel, which had agreed with the college to let students use its swimming pool, refused to let blacks swim, he organized a picket line. The protest surrounded the block. As a result, the hotel closed its pool to all students. In a 2013 interview with The New York Times, President Barack Obama said,

"When you think about the coalition that brought about civil rights, it wasn't just folks who believed in racial equality; it was people who believed in working folks having a fair shot. It was Walter Reuther and the UAW coming down here because they understood that if there are some workers who are not getting a fair deal then ultimately that’s going to undercut their ability to get a fair deal."

==== Walk to Freedom, 1963 ====
The Walk to Freedom was a mass march during the Civil Rights Movement on June 23, 1963, in Detroit, Michigan. The purpose of the demonstration was to protest racism, segregation, and the brutality inflicted upon civil rights activists in the South as well as the discrimination facing African-Americans in the North such as inequality in hiring, wages, education, and housing. In some ways, it was considered a dress rehearsal for the March on Washington for Jobs and Freedom, which was scheduled for two months later. An estimated 125,000 people attended and it was the largest civil rights demonstration in the nation's history up to that date. Reuther mobilized support for the protest and donated office space at the UAW's headquarters Solidarity House for Martin Luther King Jr. to organize the event. Along with others, including King, Reuther marched down Woodward Avenue and delivered remarks afterwards at Cobo Hall. It was there that King delivered his first version of his "I Have a Dream," speech, having penned it, at least partially, inside his office at Solidarity House.

External audio
- Complete radio coverage of the March on Washington, August 28, 1963, Educational Radio Network
- Walter Reuther's remarks begin at 40:40, August 28, 1963, Educational Radio Network

==== March on Washington, 1963 ====
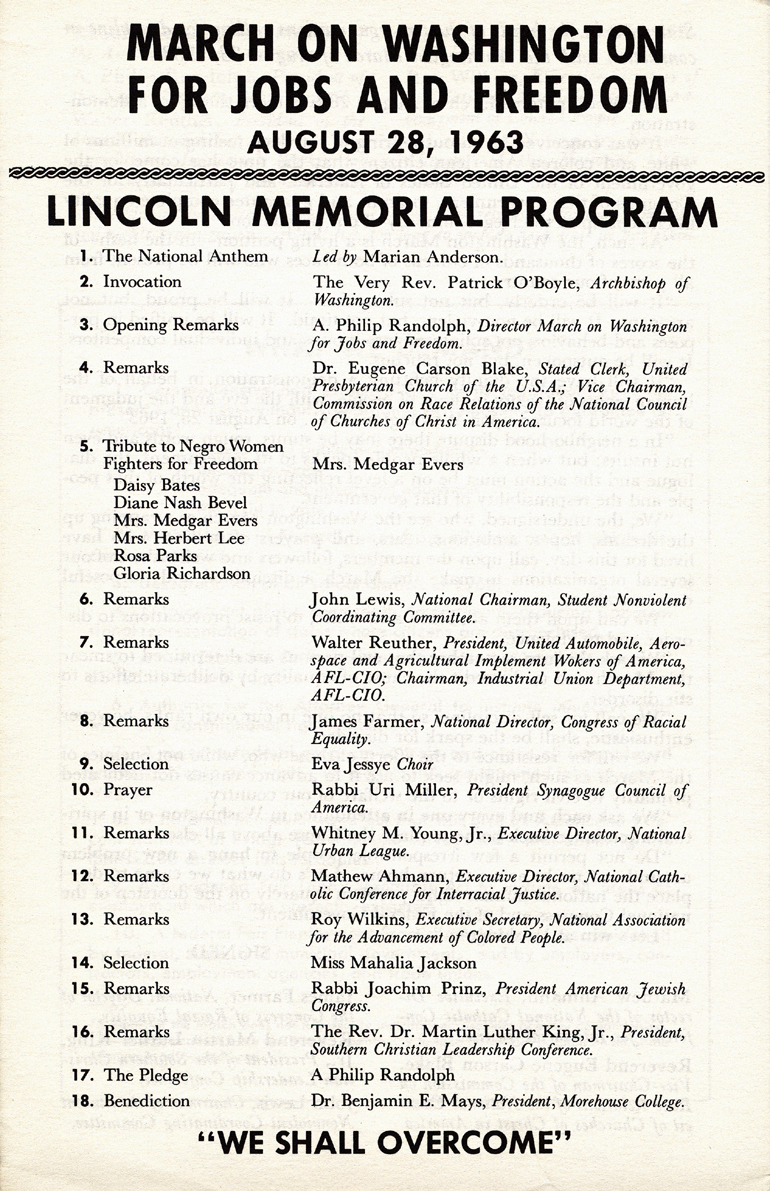
Official program of March on Washington for Jobs and Freedom

The March on Washington for Jobs and Freedom was held in Washington, D.C., on Wednesday, August 28, 1963. The protest sought to advocate for the civil and economic rights of African Americans. Along with the Big Six and three white religious leaders, Mathew Ahmann, Eugene Carson Blake, and Rabbi Joachim Prinz, Reuther helped organize the march. Originally, the march was planned to take place outside of the Capitol Building. Reuther, however, persuaded the other organizers to move the march to the Lincoln Memorial. He believed the Lincoln Memorial would be less threatening to Congress and the occasion would be more appropriate underneath the gaze of Abraham Lincoln's statue. The committee, notably Bayard Rustin, agreed to move the site on the condition that Reuther pay for a $19,000 sound system so that everyone on the National Mall could hear the speakers and musicians. Reuther and the UAW financed bus transportation for 5,000 of its rank-and-file members, providing the largest single contingent from any organization. The UAW also paid for and brought thousands of signs for marchers to carry. Among other things, the signs read: "There Is No Halfway House on the Road to Freedom", "Equal Rights and Jobs NOW", "UAW Supports Freedom March", "in Freedom we are Born, in Freedom we must Live", and "Before we'll be a Slave, we'll be Buried in our Grave".

Reuther was the most prominent white organizer scheduled to speak. In his remarks, on the steps of the Lincoln Memorial, he urged Americans to pressure their politicians to act to address racial injustices. He said:

American democracy is on trial in the eyes of the world… We cannot successfully preach democracy in the world unless we first practice democracy at home. American democracy will lack the moral credentials and be both unequal to and unworthy of leading the forces of freedom against the forces of tyranny unless we take bold, affirmative, adequate steps to bridge the moral gap between American democracy's noble promises and its ugly practices in the field of civil rights.

According to Irving Bluestone, who was standing near the platform while Reuther delivered his remarks, he overheard two black women talking. One asked, "Who is that white man?" The other replied, "Don't you know him? That's the white Martin Luther King."

After the march, the civil rights leaders met with President Kennedy at the White House to discuss civil rights legislation. During the meeting, Reuther described to Kennedy how he was framing the civil rights issue to business leaders in Detroit, saying, "Look, you can't escape the problem. And there are two ways of resolving it; either by reason or riots." Reuther continued, "Now the civil war that this is gonna trigger is not gonna be fought at Gettysburg. It's gonna to be fought in your backyard, in your plant, where your kids are growing up."

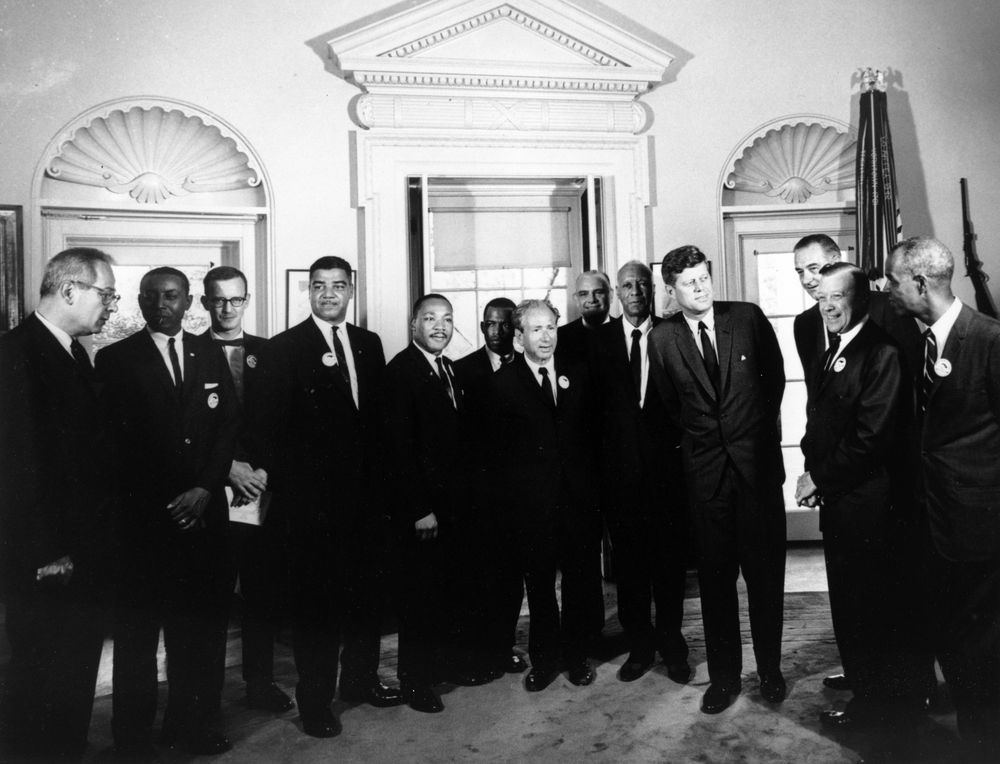
Kennedy and Johnson with organizers of the "March on Washington" at the White House on August 28, 1963

==== Selma voting rights movement and "Bloody Sunday", 1965 ====
On March 9, 1965, two days after Bloody Sunday, where civil rights marchers were beaten by state police at the Edmond Pettus Bridge in Selma, Alabama, Reuther sent a telegram to President Johnson, reading in part:

Americans of all religious faiths, of all political persuasions, and from every section of our Nation are deeply shocked and outraged at the tragic events in Selma Ala., and they look to the Federal Government as the only possible source to protect and guarantee the exercise of constitutional rights, which is being denied and destroyed by the Dallas County law enforcement agents and the Alabama State troops under the direction of Governor George Wallace.

Under these circumstances, Mr President, I join in urging you to take immediate and appropriate steps including the use of Federal marshals and troops if necessary, so that the full exercise of constitutional rights including free assembly and free speech be fully protected.

Sunday's spectacle of tear gas and night sticks, whips, and electric cattle prods used against defenseless citizens demonstrating to secure their constitutional right to register and vote as American citizens was an outrage against all decency. This shameful brutality by law enforcing agents makes a mockery of Americans’ concepts of justice and provides effective ammunition to Communist propaganda and our enemies around the world who would weaken and destroy us.

Following the death of Unitarian Universalist minister James Reeb, a memorial service was held at the Brown's Chapel AME Church on March 15. Among those who addressed the packed congregation were Reuther, King, and some clergymen. A picture of King, Reuther, Greek Orthodox Archbishop Iakovos and others in Selma for Reeb's memorial service appeared on the cover of Life magazine on March 26, 1965. After the memorial service, upon getting permission from the courts, the leaders and attendees marched from the church to the Dallas County Courthouse in Selma.

==== Cesar Chavez and the United Farm Workers, 1965 ====
In December 1965, Reuther visited Cesar Chavez and the striking grape growers in Delano, California. Two months earlier, Reuther's brother and colleague, Roy, had visited the striking farmworkers. Upon returning from his visit, Roy urged Walter to support Chavez. At that time, Chavez's struggle for workers' rights was little known to the American public, but Reuther's visit garnered national media attention, making it difficult for the growers to ignore the striking grape pickers. During the trip, Reuther marched with Chavez and his fellow strikers, carrying picket signs reading "Huelga". Reuther also spoke to a packed union hall, declaring, "This is not your strike, this is our strike!" He pledged that the UAW would provide $7,500 per month to the United Farm Workers' strike fund for the duration of the strike.

Upon returning to Detroit, Reuther contacted Senator Robert F. Kennedy, who was on the Senate Labor Committee, requesting that Kennedy visit Chavez in Delano to learn about and support the farmworkers. Kennedy obliged, ultimately becoming the most visible supporter of the farmworkers' movement. Reuther visited Chavez many times, including once during Chavez's hunger strike. During that visit, Reuther made a $50,000 donation to Chavez's struggle to which Chavez said, "Walter, you have given me great confidence." Reuther replied, "You will prevail for your cause is just." In honor of the Reuther brothers' early and sustained support, the United Farm Workers named a building at their Delano headquarters the "Roy Reuther Administration Building".

==== March Against Fear, 1966 ====
Following the shooting of civil rights activist James Meredith, the first African-American to attend the segregated University of Mississippi, Reuther and his wife May traveled from Chicago to Jackson, Mississippi, to march with King and his wife Coretta, among other civil rights activists. Reuther brought 10 buses full of union supporters.

==== Memphis sanitation strike, 1968 ====
On April 8, four days after King's assassination, Reuther marched with Coretta Scott King and others in Memphis, Tennessee, in support of a peaceful resolution of the city's sanitation strike. In addition, Reuther donated $50,000 from the UAW to the striking sanitation workers, which was the largest financial contribution by any outside source.

=== Environmentalism ===
Reuther sought to build an environmental movement made up of all classes of society to address social, ecological, aesthetic, and resource-conservation issues. In 1965, the UAW organized a "United Action for Clean Water Conference" in Detroit, where Reuther called for the "beginning of a massive mobilization of citizens ... of a popular crusade not only for clean water, but also for cleaning up the atmosphere, the highways, the junkyards and the slums and for creating a total living environment worthy of free men". In 1967, three years before the first Earth Day, Reuther established the Department of Conservation and Resource Development, later headed by Olga Madar, to combat pollution, including automobile emissions. In 1968, speaking at the annual conference of the Water Pollution Control Federation, Reuther stated: "If we continue to destroy our living environment by polluting our streams and poisoning our air ... We may be the first civilization in the history of man that will have suffocated and been strangled in the waste of its material affluence—compounded by social indifference and social neglect." At the annual UAW convention in 1970 in Atlantic City, Reuther said: "Because industry has for so long polluted the environment of the plants in which we work and has now created an environmental crisis of catastrophic proportions in the communities in which we live, the UAW will insist on discussing the implications of this crisis at the bargaining table."

==== Earth Day ====
Reuther made the first donation to support the first Earth Day in 1970 in the amount of $2,000. Under his leadership, the UAW also funded telephone capabilities for organizers to communicate and coordinate with each other from across the United States. The UAW also financed, printed, and mailed all of the literature and other materials for the first Earth Day and mobilized its membership to participate in the public demonstrations across the country. According to Denis Hayes, the chief national coordinator of the first Earth Day, "The UAW was by far the largest contributor to the first Earth Day" and "Without the UAW, the first Earth Day would have likely flopped!" Hayes further said, "Walter’s presence at our first press conference utterly changed the dynamics of the coverage—we had instant credibility." Following Reuther's death less than one month after the first Earth Day, the organizers of Environmental Action, the key group that organized the first Earth Day, dedicated a book containing a collection of speeches from Earth Day to Reuther, saying "We would like to pay tribute to Walter Reuther, a friend and ally in the movement for peace, justice, and a livable environment. We admired his courage and his foresight, and we are deeply grateful for the help he gave us."

==== Redwood National Park ====
Reuther supported the establishment of Redwood National Park, writing President Johnson in 1966:

The preservation of a significant stand of these magnificent trees will be a truly monumental step, in the implementation of the 'Great Society.' Several months ago I asked our Recreation Department to gather the facts regarding the size and location of a Redwood National Park. After careful consideration of the results of this study, the UAW supports the creation of a Redwood National Park of some 90,000 acres .... This proposal contains virgin redwood forests of unequaled magnitude, ecological conditions most advantageous to redwood preservation, outstanding panoramic views, a long ocean-front beach, wildlife concentrations of major size, as well as a number of wilderness watersheds.

President Johnson wrote Reuther back, stating that his administration would establish Redwood National Park come hell or high water.

=== Filibuster ===
In 1957, during a speech before the annual convention of the NAACP, Reuther coined the United States Senate "the graveyard of civil rights legislation", and called for the abolition of the body's filibuster.

== Assassination attempts ==
In April 1938, two masked gunmen attempted to abduct Reuther at a party he was hosting. However, one guest managed to flee and alert the authorities, leading to their arrest. At the trial, the defense argued that Reuther staged the entire event as a publicity stunt. Links between the gunmen and Harry Bennett (a union-busting enemy of the UAW) were not disclosed to the jury.

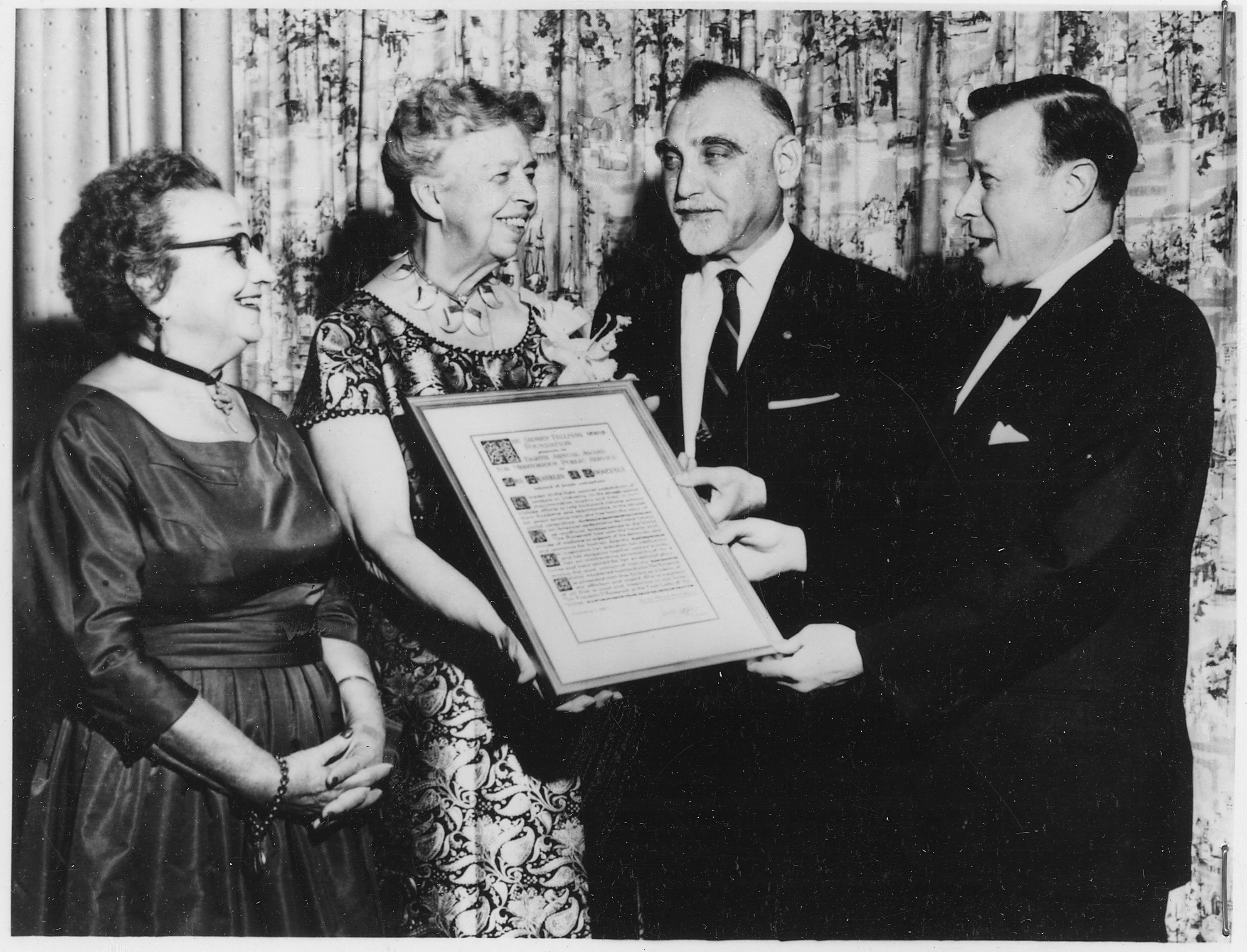
Bessie Hillman, Eleanor Roosevelt, Jacob Potofsky, and Walter Reuther in New York City, January 7, 1957

On April 20, 1948, Reuther barely survived a double-barrel shotgun blast that ripped through his kitchen window as he was preparing a late evening snack. As the gunshot went off at 9:48 pm, EST, Reuther happened to turn toward his wife, and was hit in his right arm instead of the chest and heart. Four slugs shattered his right arm into 150 pieces of bone. Another slug pierced his back and exited out his stomach. The assailant “fled in a bright red four-door Ford sedan, police said.” Reuther, who did not lose consciousness, cursed his attacker as he was initially being treated by his next-door-neighbor, a doctor, as he lay on the kitchen floor. “‘Those dirty sons of bitches!’ Reuther cried. ‘They have to shoot a man in the back. They won’t come out in the open and fight.’” As doctors fought to save his life, he became infected with malaria and hepatitis from blood transfusions. Through months of therapy, he regained partial use of his right arm, but for the rest of his life had to train himself to write and shake hands with his left hand. When Attorney General Tom Clark requested J. Edgar Hoover to get the FBI to investigate the shooting, Hoover refused, stating, "I'm not going to send in the FBI every time some nigger woman gets raped." The shooting was never solved.

Thirteen months after the attack, Reuther's brother Victor was almost killed by a similar shooting from a double-barrel shotgun. The blast traveled through his living room window and hit him in the face, throat, and chest. Victor's right eye had been shot out and had to be removed. Victor said, "The attack on me was a way of serving notice to Walter. 'We didn't get you yet, but we're still around.'" The shooting of Victor was also never solved.

In the wake of both shootings, Eleanor Roosevelt wrote: "It seems unthinkable that the police have never been able to discover who shot Walter Reuther and because of that, in all probability, the same person perhaps has felt he could get away with shooting another brother. … [W]e have a right to protect men who are working in the interests of their fellow men."

== Death ==
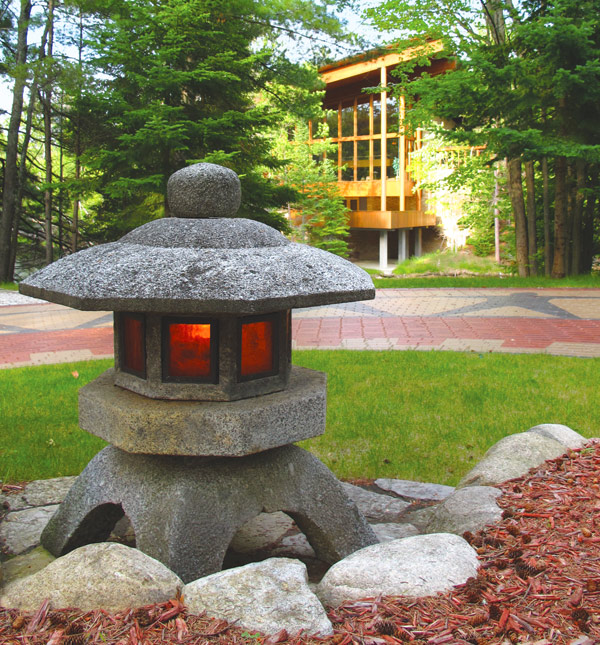
The Walter and May Reuther Eternal Flame at the UAW Black Lake Conference Center in northern Michigan

On May 9, 1970, Walter Reuther, his wife May, architect Oscar Stonorov, Reuther's bodyguard William Wolfman, pilot George O. Evans and co-pilot Joseph U. Karaffa were killed when their chartered Learjet 23 crashed in flames at 9:33 p.m. Eastern Time. The plane, arriving from Detroit in rain and fog, was on final approach to Pellston Regional Airport in Pellston, Michigan, near the UAW's recreational and educational facility at Black Lake, Michigan. The National Transportation Safety Board discovered that the plane's altimeter was missing parts, some incorrect parts were installed, and one of its parts had been installed upside down, leading some to speculate that Reuther may have been murdered. Reuther had been subjected earlier to two attempted assassinations and a similar near-crash in a small plane in 1969.

Journalist Michael Parenti wrote, "Reuther's demise appears as part of a truncation of liberal and radical leadership that included the deaths of four national figures: President John Kennedy, Malcolm X, Martin Luther King, and Senator Robert Kennedy."

=== Funeral ===
Reuther's funeral was held on May 15, 1970, at Ford Auditorium in Detroit, Michigan. An estimated 3,400 people were in attendance. Among others, Coretta Scott King eulogized:

Walter Reuther was to black people, the most widely known and respected white labor leader in the nation. He was there when the storm clouds were thick. We remember him in Montgomery. He was in Birmingham. He marched with us in Selma, and Jackson, Mississippi, and in Washington. ... Only yesterday, there he was again in Charleston, South Carolina, the leader of a million and a half workers giving personal support to a strike of only 400 black women. ... He was a big man, so of course he had enemies and detractors. He had the courage to be with the minority when it was right. He was a simple man in his personal life, a rare quality in these flamboyant times ... but if his ways were simple, his ideas were grand. He aroused the imagination of millions. ... He was fighting the fight of the whole world.

== Personal life ==
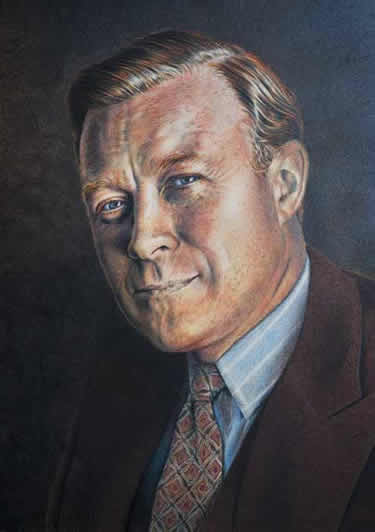
Portrait of Reuther, Hall of Honor, Department of Labor

Walter and May Reuther were married on March 13, 1936, after meeting on a streetcar in Detroit only six weeks earlier. They had two daughters, Linda born in 1942 and Elisabeth in 1947.

Reuther led a simple, austere lifestyle. He neither smoked nor drank alcohol because he felt it sapped a person's vitality. For his daily lunch in his office he had the same menu: a sandwich and a cup of tea. He was an early riser. Author William Manchester wrote that Reuther's associates saw him as a “true ascetic.”

To relax he liked to hike, fish and play tennis. His favorite music was German Lieder, Classical, Spirituals and Union Songs. Although sometimes perceived as rigid with no sense of humor, Reuther's colleague and friend Irving Bluestone said: "That wasn't true at all. He was a very easy person to work with and be with. He had a good sense of humor and could laugh at himself. And occasionally, when he was excited enough, he would use profanity just like anyone else coming out of the shop."

Reuther enjoyed being and working outdoors in nature. Whether building a fish ladder for the trout underneath their bridge or planting a Japanese Garden for May that she could view outside their bedroom window, he enjoyed and relaxed by working on outdoor projects on his Paint Creek property, located outside Rochester, Michigan. He and his daughter Lisa planted an arboretum, including over 50 types of trees, at their Paint Creek home. He was an expert woodworker and built much of the furniture for their home with his own hands. After the assassination attempt in 1948, which shattered his arm in 150 pieces, he rehabilitated his arm by squeezing a hard rubber ball and pushing out the walls to build their Paint Creek home from what had been a one-room cottage. He remarked, "I got a good house and a good hand, all for the same money."

May was Walter's sounding board and close advisor throughout his public life. May was a teacher and involved in organizing a teachers’ union. Early on she was making $60 a week of which she gave most to help organize auto workers into the fledgling UAW. She soon gave up her teaching career to become Walter's full-time secretary, earning $15 per week. She was active in many charities and programs to uplift the community. May marched side-by-side with Walter in the civil rights struggles in Selma and elsewhere. She hosted Eleanor Roosevelt at their Paint Creek home. She also served as president of the PTA at their daughter's school. After the assassination attempt on Walter's life in 1948, May decided to spend most of her time at home trying to give their two daughters as normal a life as possible; although, the family had bodyguards and attack dogs living with them the rest of their lives.

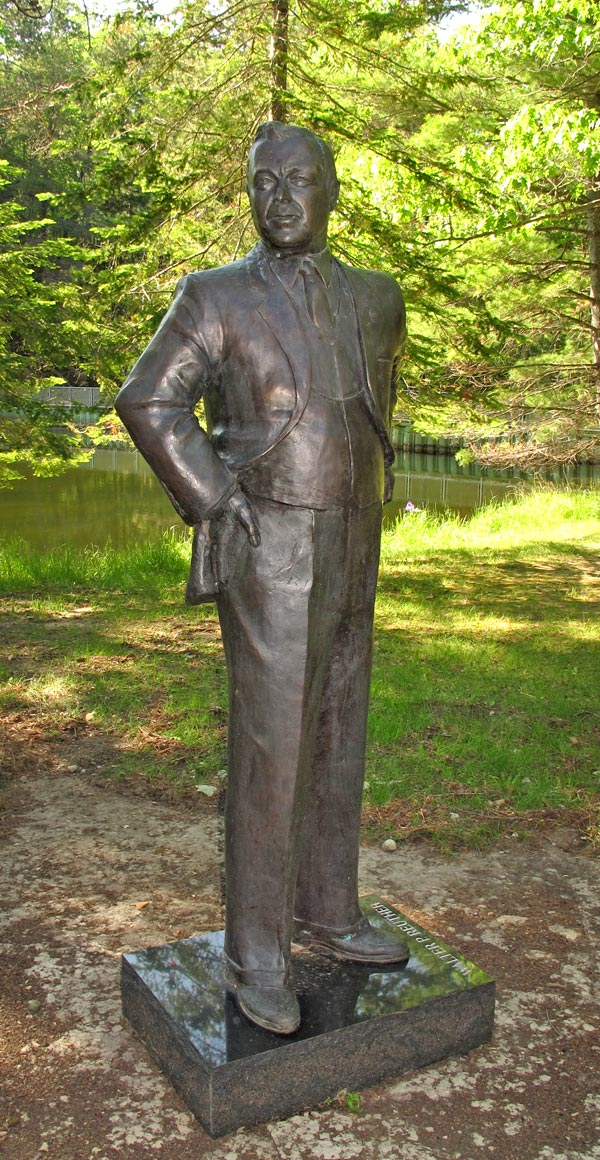
Walter Reuther statue located at the Walter and May Reuther UAW Family Education Center in Black Lake, Michigan

== Honors and awards ==
- The National Religion and Labor Foundation presented Reuther with their Social Justice Award in 1955.
- Reuther received the Eugene V. Debs Award in 1968 for his work in Industrial Unionism.
- The National Committee for Israel Labor gave Reuther the Histadrut Humanitarian Award in 1958.
- The Weizmann Institute of Science in Israel gave Reuther the Weizmann Award in the Sciences and Humanities in 1968 and established the Walter P. Reuther Chair of Research in the Peaceful Uses of Atomic Energy.
- Reuther received honorary degrees from, among other institutions, Harvard University, University of Michigan, Oakland University, Tuskegee University, and University of Rhode Island.
- There are three portraits and one sculpture of Reuther in the collection of the Smithsonian Institute's National Portrait Gallery in Washington, D.C.
- Reuther appeared on the covers of Time Magazine twice, Newsweek three times, Der Spiegel once, The New York Times Magazine once, and Life magazine once.

== Legacy ==
Reuther was recognized by Time Magazine as one of the 100 most influential people of the 20th century. He was posthumously awarded the Presidential Medal of Freedom in 1995 by President Bill Clinton, who remarked at the ceremony, "Walter Reuther was an American visionary so far ahead of his times that although he died a quarter of a century ago, our Nation has yet to catch up to his dreams." Murray Kempton, a Pulitzer Prize-winning journalist, wrote, "Walter Reuther is the only man I have ever met who could reminisce about the future." A. H. Raskin, labor editor of The New York Times, wrote, "If the speed of a man's mind could be measured in the same way as the speed of his legs, Walter Reuther would be an Olympic champion." George Romney, Governor of Michigan, once said, "Walter Reuther is the most dangerous man in Detroit because no one is more skillful in bringing about the revolution without seeming to disrupt the existing forms of society."

- Reuther appears in Time magazine's list of the 100 most influential people of the 20th century.
- Reuther was inducted into the Department of Labor's Hall of Honor.
- The Walter P. Reuther Humanitarian Award was created in 1999 by Wayne State University.
- The Reuther-Chavez Award was created in 2002 by Americans for Democratic Action "to recognize important activist, scholarly and journalistic contributions on behalf of workers' rights, especially the right to unionize and bargain collectively."
- The Walter P. Reuther Memorial was dedicated October 12, 2006, at Heritage Port in Wheeling, West Virginia. The seven foot bronze statue of Walter Reuther was created by sculptor Alan Cottrill of Zanesville, Ohio. Inscribed on the granite pedestal it stands upon are the words of Reuther himself: “There is no greater calling than to serve your fellow man. There is no greater contribution than to help the weak. There is no greater satisfaction than to have done it well.”
- Reuther's home near Rochester, Michigan, was listed on the National Register of Historic Places in 2002.

=== Walter P. Reuther Humanitarian Award ===
In 1999, Wayne State University, in collaboration with the UAW and the Reuther family, created the Walter P. Reuther Humanitarian Award to honor individuals who embody the spirit, vision, and values of Reuther. The recipients of the award include civil rights activist Rosa Parks, Congressman John Dingell, civil rights activist Joseph Lowery, UAW president Douglas Fraser, and civil rights activist and Congressman John Lewis.

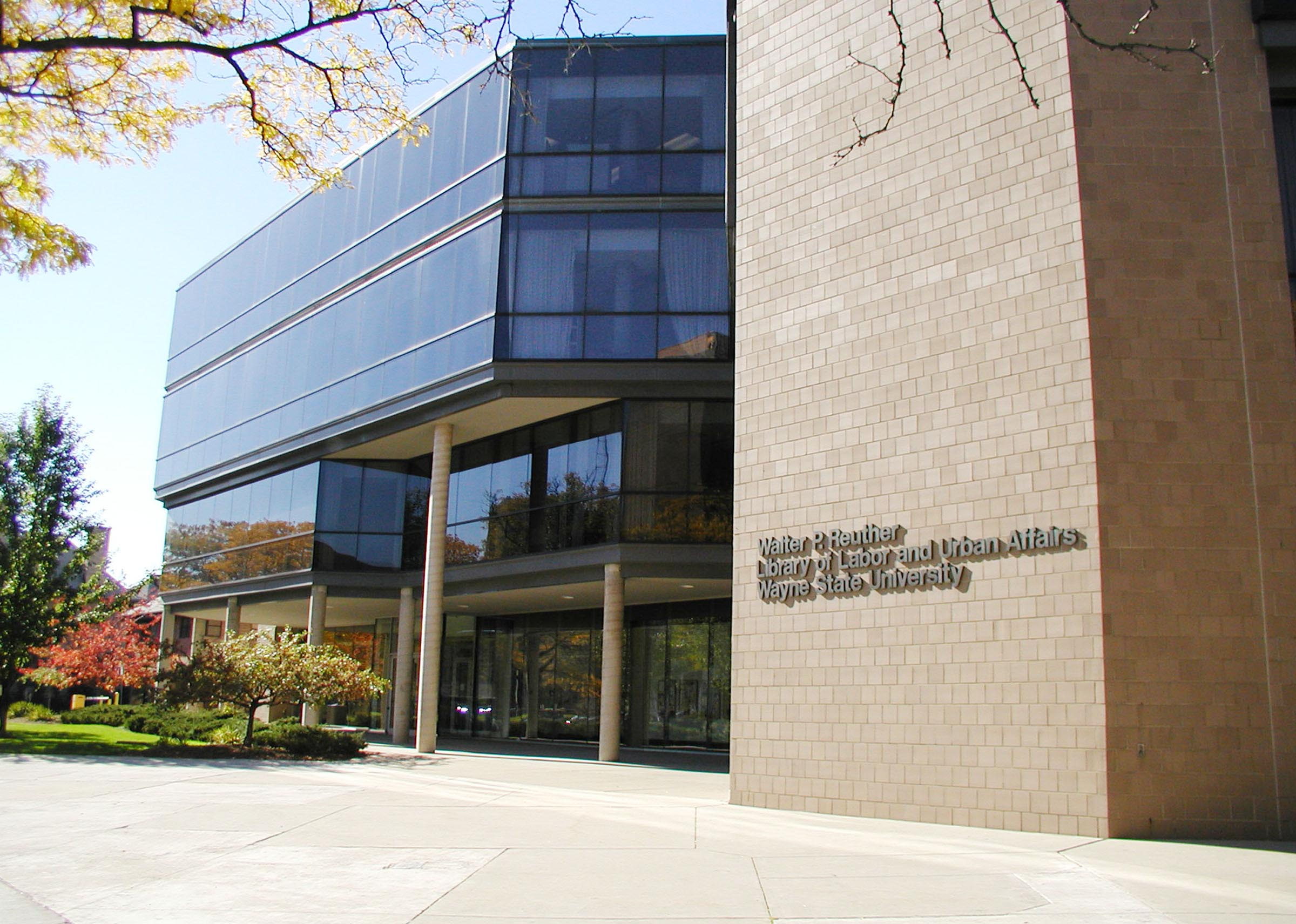
Walter P. Reuther Library, Wayne State University, Detroit, Michigan

=== Places named for Reuther ===
- Walter P. Reuther Library, the largest labor archives in North America, located on the campus of Wayne State University in Detroit, Michigan
- Walter P. Reuther Freeway (I-696), stretching from the eastern to western suburbs of Detroit
- Walter and May Reuther Family Education Center, Black Lake, Michigan
- Walter Reuther Psychiatric Hospital, Westland, Michigan
- Reuther Middle School, Rochester Hills, Michigan
- Walter Reuther Central High School, Kenosha, Wisconsin
- Reuther Way, street connecting GM plant to Interstate 90/39, Janesville, Wisconsin
- The Walter Reuther Center for youngsters, Holon, Israel

=== Cultural references ===
- Reuther is portrayed in Robert Schenkkan's Broadway play All the Way, which won the 2014 Tony Award for Best Play. The play was subsequently adapted into a television drama by HBO in 2016 in which Reuther is portrayed by Spencer Garrett.
- Greg Pliska and Charley Morey are presently creating a musical about Reuther's life titled "A Most Dangerous Man," the date of which it will be released is unknown.
- Thomas Pynchon's novel V. alludes to Reuther as follows: "Zeitsuss the boss secretly wanted to be a union organizer. ... His job was civil service but someday he would be Walter Reuther." (p. 112 in the Vintage 2000 edition)

== Archival records ==
The archival records of Reuther can be found mostly at the Walter P. Reuther Library of Labor and Urban Affairs. Notable are the UAW President's Office: Walter P. Reuther Records, an extensive collection that documents his time as President with the UAW. The materials include Reuther's personal correspondence, writings, photographs, official memorandum, and other various record types. Researchers are encouraged to contact the Reuther library for inquiries or access to materials. A guide to Reuther's archival materials can be found here.

== See also ==
- List of civil rights leaders
- Walter P. and May Wolf Reuther House

== Bibliography ==
=== Secondary sources ===
- Barnard, John. American Vanguard: The United Auto Workers during the Reuther Years, 1935–1970. (Wayne State U. Press, 2004). 607 pp. major scholarly history
- Barnard, John. Walter Reuther and the rise of the auto workers (1983); short scholarly biography online
- Bernstein, Barton J. "Walter Reuther and the General Motors Strike of 1945-1946" Michigan History (1965) 49#3 pp 260–277.
- Boyle, Kevin. The UAW and the Heyday of American Liberalism, 1945–1968 (1995)online
- Brattain, Michelle. "Reuther, Walter Philip"; American National Biography Online Feb. 2000 Access March 21, 2015
- Buffa, Dudley W. Union power and American democracy: the UAW and the Democratic Party, 1972-83 (1984) online
- Carew, Anthony. Walter Reuther (Manchester University Press, 1993), short scholarly biography online
- Carew, Anthony. American Labour's Cold War Abroad: From Deep Freeze to Détente, 1945-1970 (2018) traces Reuther versus Meany on foreign policy.
- Goode, Bill. Infighting in the UAW: The 1946 Election and the Ascendancy of Walter Reuther (Greenwood, 1994) online also see online review
- Halpern, Martin. UAW Politics in the Cold War Era (SUNY Press, 1988) online
- Howe, Irving. The UAW and Walter Reuther (1949) online
- Kempton, Murray. "The Reuther Brothers" in Part of Our Time: Some Ruins and Monuments of the Thirties (1955, repr. 1998, repr. 2004)
- Kornhauser, Arthur et al. When Labor Votes: A Study of Auto Workers (1956)
- Lichtenstein, Nelson. "Walter Reuther and the Rise of Labor-Liberalism" in Labor Leaders in America (1987): 280–302. online.
- Lichtenstein, Nelson. Walter Reuther: The Most Dangerous Man in Detroit (1995). a major scholarly biography; online
- Parrish, Michael E. Citizen Rauh: An American Liberal's Life in Law and Politics (U of Michigan Press, 2010), "Chapter 10: Reuther and Randolph" (pp. 121–132) https://doi.org/10.3998/mpub.1189267 on civil rights work of Joseph L. Rauh Jr., Reuther and A. Philip Randolph
- Parenti, Michael and Peggy Norton. The Wonderful Life and Strange Death of Walter Reuther (1996)
- Steigerwald, David. "Walter Reuther, the UAW, and the dilemmas of automation," Labor History (2010) 51#3 pp 429–453.
- Zieger, Robert H. The CIO, 1935–1955 (1995) online

=== Documentaries ===
- Reuther, Sasha, "Brothers on the Line", Documentary (2012)
- Zwerin, Charlotte. "Sit Down and Fight - Walter Reuther and the Rise of the Auto Workers' Union" (Charlotte Zwerin Films, 1993) aired in February 1993 on the PBS series, The American Experience.

=== Primary sources ===
- Christman, Henry M. ed. Walter P. Reuther: Selected Papers (1961)
- Reuther, Victor. The Brothers Reuther and The Story of the UAW: A Memoir (1976)
- The Walter P. Reuther Library, Archives of Labor and Urban Affairs on the campus of Wayne State University contains numerous collections related to Walter Reuther, most notably the UAW President's Office: Walter P. Reuther Files, which "reflect all phases of his career as president, UAW West Side Local 174 (1936); UAW Executive Board member (1936); director, UAW General Motors Department (1939–48); UAW vice-president (1942–46); UAW president (1946–70); president, ClO (1952–55); vice-president, AFL-CIO (1955–67); and president, AFL-CIO Industrial Union Department (1955–67)."

Trade union offices
Preceded by R. J. Thomas	President of the United Auto Workers; 1946–1970	Succeeded by Leonard Woodcock
Preceded by Philip Murray	President of the Congress of Industrial Organizations; 1952–1955	Succeeded by Office abolished (The merged AFL-CIO was led by George Meany.)
Preceded by Department founded	President of the Industrial Union Department, AFL-CIO; 1955–1967	Succeeded by I. W. Abel
Preceded by William F. Schnitzler; Emil Rieve	AFL-CIO delegate to the Trades Union Congress; 1957; With: Joseph D. Keenan	Succeeded by George McGregor Harrison; Jacob Potofsky
