= Irving Bluestone =

American trade union leader

Irving Julius Bluestone (January 5, 1917 – November 17, 2007) was an American trade union leader. He was the chief negotiator for almost half a million workers at General Motors in the 1970s and an advocate of worker participation in management. He was born in Brooklyn, New York, to Herman and Rebecca Chasman Bluestone, Lithuanian Jewish emigrants.

He graduated from New York City College in 1937 with a degree in German literature. He spent the following year pursuing his postgraduate degree at the University of Bern in Switzerland. He became aware of the Nazi terror when a priest to whom he had shown a letter of introduction refused to speak to Bluestone, a Jew, reportedly out of fear of Nazi reprisal. "I became convinced", Bluestone would state in 1970, "that only a strong labor movement can preserve democracy. The first thing that Hitler did was to destroy the labor parties in Germany."

Mr. Bluestone returned to the United States, landing a job at a GM plant in Harrison, New Jersey, and plunging into union activities. He became a protégé of Walter Reuther in 1946. Bluestone was vice president of the UAW's General Motors department from 1970 to 1980. In addition to leading GM negotiations, he led strikes at individual plants. Bluestone was "the early advocate in the UAW" of what the industry called Quality of Worklife programs, in which workers were involved in "discussing workplace rules and improving the cars". After retiring, Irving Bluestone taught industrial relations at Wayne State University in Detroit.

== Death ==
He died on November 17, 2007, of heart failure at his home in Brookline, Massachusetts, aged 90, survived by his son Barry Bluestone and two daughters, and four grandchildren. His wife of 61 years, Zelda Fitch Bluestone, died in 2001.

== Archival collections ==
The Irving Bluestone Papers at the Walter P. Reuther Library date from 1955 to 1998 and highlight his retirement years after 1980. The collection covers his time spent on labor councils, worker's programs, economic alliances, technology and manufacturing research, and Quality of Work Life and Joint Action programs. Included are correspondence, publications, speeches, and his educational work and research.

Also at the Walter P. Reuther Library, is the Irving Bluestone: Saturn Corporation Collection. Placed in the Archives of Labor and Urban Affairs in 1995 and contains documents and other materials pertaining to the “development of the co-management/team production model at Saturn.

The Walter P. Reuther Library also houses the UAW Vice President's Office: Irving Bluestone Records which date from 1959-1980. Material in this collection consists of correspondence, minutes, reports, clippings, pamphlets and negotiations material related to Bluestone's career in the UAW, especially the affairs of the General Motors Department.
