= Walter P. and May Wolf Reuther House =

- U.S. National Register of Historic Places
- U.S. Historic district
- Interactive map
- Location: 3924-3950-3954 Ellamae, Rochester, Michigan
- Coordinates: 42°44′28″N 83°10′19″W
- Area: 2.1 acres (0.85 ha)
- Built: 1951
- Architect: Walter Reuther, Oscar Stonorov
- Architectural style: International Style
- NRHP reference No.: 02000668
- Added to NRHP: June 20, 2002

The Walter P. and May Wolf Reuther House is a single-family home located at 3924-3950-3954 Ellamae in Oakland Township near Rochester, Michigan. The house was built for Walter Reuther, president of the United Automobile Workers union, and his wife. They lived here from 1951 until their deaths in 1970. It was listed on the National Register of Historic Places in 2002.

== History ==
In 1951, Walter and May Reuther located these lots, intending to develop them into a summer house for the family. They stayed in a small house on the site that summer, but by the end of the summer decided to stay here permanently. Reuther consulted with architect and family friend Oscar Stonorov, and the two men collaborated on a design for a ranch-style house on the property. It was soon built and the family moved in, settling permanently here in 1953. Reuther tinkered with the design of the house over the years, adding onto it., and later built a guest house to host visiting diplomats.

The Reuthers lived in this house until their deaths in a plane crash, together with Oscar Stonorov, on May 9, 1970. The complex was sold by their heirs in 1973.

This home is currently for sale as of June 9, 2026 with Christie's listed at url = https://www.atproperties.com/20261041689/3954-n-ellamae-road-oakland-michigan-48363-realcomp

== Description ==
The Walter P. and May Wolf Reuther House sits on three adjacent lots with the winding Paint Creek running through the property. The grounds contain three buildings: the modern wood-sided main house with stone chimneys near the creek, a soaring modern wood and glass-walled guest house also near the creek, and a modern ranch style guard house close to the road.

The main house is located within a bow of Paint Creek, and is approached by narrow wooden walking bridges over the water. It is a one-story building, clad with vertical redwood planks painted dark brown and sitting on a concrete block foundation. A two-story addition is connected to the center of the building, under which is a small enclosed entry portico. Floor-to-ceiling windows look out over Paint Creek, and a large stone chimney extends to one side.

The guest house is a two-story wooden modern style building with a low pitched sloping roof and a wooden deck that extends over Paint Creek. It has vertical wooden siding of the same material and color as in the main house. The elevation overlooking the creek is almost all glass.

The guard house is a rectangular, ranch-style house with low-pitched sloping roof standing on a high knoll.

== See also ==
- National Register of Historic Places listings in Oakland County, Michigan
