= Detroit Walk to Freedom =

1963 mass civil rights march

Walk to Freedom
- Part of the Civil Rights Movement
- Date: June 23, 1963
- Location: Adelaide Street, Woodward Avenue and Cobo Hall in Detroit, Michigan
- Caused by: 20th anniversary of the Detroit race riot of 1943; Race-based discrimination in downtown Detroit
- Result: 125,000 or more people participate; Martin Luther King Jr. delivered precursor speech of "I Have a Dream"

The Walk to Freedom was a mass march during the Civil Rights Movement on June 23, 1963, in Detroit, Michigan. It drew crowds of an estimated 125,000 or more and was known as "the largest civil rights demonstration in the nation's history" up to that date.

Various ministers and leaders of local and national organizations, including the mayor of Detroit, were in attendance and gave speeches. Among them was Martin Luther King Jr. who after the Walk to Freedom March gave an impassioned speech. It was a precursor to his famous "I Have a Dream" speech given weeks later in Washington, D.C. The march itself was, to King and his supporters, partly a practice run of the March on Washington for Jobs and Freedom.

Due to the greater size of the March on Washington, the Detroit Walk to Freedom has been somewhat lost to obscurity outside of local Detroit history. At the time, Dr. King called it "one of the most wonderful things that has happened in America."

== Origins ==
Reverend Clarence L. Franklin and Reverend Albert Cleage were Civil Rights leaders who, although they had very different viewpoints and methods of tackling injustice, came together and proposed the idea of having a large march or demonstration in Detroit. Together along with other organizers, they formed the Detroit Council for Human Rights which would be the organization that would actually put on the Walk to Freedom march. Cleage originally wanted the march to be all black and led by blacks only; however, the local Detroit branch of the National Association for the Advancement of Colored People (NAACP) was prepared to not support the march and even boycott it if the DCHR did not include some local white leaders in the march. Although the march was open to all, the vast majority that came to the march were African-American, but there were several prominent whites, such as the Mayor of Detroit Jerome Cavanagh, who joined in leading the march or otherwise showed their support.

== Purpose ==
The Walk to Freedom had two main purposes. The first and main purpose of the march "… was to speak out against segregation and the brutality that met civil rights activists in the South while at the same time addressing concerns of African Americans in the urban North: inequality in hiring practices, wages, education, and housing." The second purpose of the march was to raise funds and awareness for the Southern Christian Leadership Conference (SCLC), which was an organization that did civil rights work in the south. The date that was picked to be when the march would take place, June 23, was to honor the 20th anniversary of Detroit race riot of 1943 in which over two dozen people were killed and many more injured.

== The March ==
=== Who Marched ===
Many prominent people, known locally and nationally, lead the Walk to Freedom. From the Detroit Council for Human Rights: Rev. C. L. Franklin, father of famous singer Aretha Franklin and was chairman of the DCHR; Rev. Albert Cleage, who was a part of forming the DCHR; and Benjamin McFall, director of the DCHR. The former Governor of Michigan John Swainson, who was governor from 1961 to 1962, joined with the mayor of Detroit Jerome Cavanaugh, and Martin Luther King Jr. Also leading the march was Walter Reuther, president of the United Auto Workers (UAW); Billie S. Farnum, who was the State Auditor General. George Romney, then current governor of Michigan, was unable to attend the march because it took place on a Sunday and conflicted with his religious practices; however, since Romney fully supported the march and the cause, he sent representatives to walk in his place.

=== Route of the March ===
To generate interest in the Walk to Freedom, stickers, handbills, and other advertisements were spread around the city by event planners. The march itself started, at about 3pm, on Woodward Avenue and Adelaide, it continued on Woodward, and then onto Jefferson and concluded at Cobo Arena and Hall. Songs were sung, such as "The Battle Hymn of the Republic", and people carried banners and signs. The whole march only lasted about an hour and a half, but afterwards there were speeches given. At least 125,000 people participated in the march and tens of thousands packed into Cobo Arena and the surrounding area to listen to the speeches.

=== Speeches ===
Many of the leaders of the march gave speeches. Albert Cleage, Walter Reuther, Mayor Cavanagh, former governor Swainson, Congressman Charles Diggs, a representative of governor Romney, Martin Luther King Jr., and others all gave speeches to the eager crowds. The speech spectators were looking forward to the most however was the one given by Martin Luther King Jr., and he obliged them by giving a speech that was as riveting as his speeches always were.

==== Martin Luther King Jr’s Speech ====
Some parts of his Detroit speech are similar to the one he gave in Washington. In particular, the end of his speech was a longer and more detailed version of the legendary "I Have a Dream" portion of his speech given two months later in Washington.

For comparison certain parts of both speeches are alternated below, given on the left is the speech in Detroit at the Walk to Freedom, and given on the right is the speech in Washington.

"Almost one hundred and one years ago, on September the 22nd, 1862, to be exact, a great and noble American, Abraham Lincoln, signed an executive order, which was to take effect on January the first, 1863. This executive order was called the Emancipation Proclamation and it served to free the Negro from the bondage of physical slavery. But one hundred years later, the Negro in the United States of America still isn't free."	"Fivescore years ago, a great American, in whose symbolic shadow we stand today, signed the Emancipation Proclamation […] But one hundred years later, the Negro still is not free. One hundred years later, the life of the Negro is still sadly crippled by the manacles of segregation and the chains of discrimination."
"And so we must say, now is the time to make real the promises of democracy. Now is the time to transform this pending national elegy into a creative psalm of brotherhood. Now is the time to lift our nation. Now is the time to lift our nation from the quicksands of racial injustice to the solid rock of racial justice."	"Now is the time to rise from the dark and desolate valley of segregation to the sunlit path of racial justice. Now is the time to lift our nation from the quicksands of racial injustice to the solid rock of brotherhood."
"And so this afternoon, I have a dream. It is a dream deeply rooted in the American dream […] I have a dream that one day, right down in Georgia and Mississippi and Alabama, the sons of former slaves and the sons of former slave owners will be able to live together as brothers. I have a dream this afternoon that one day, one day little white children and little Negro children will be able to join hands as brothers and sisters […] I have a dream this afternoon that my four little children, that my four little children will not come up in the same young days that I came up within, but they will be judged on the basis of the content of their character, not the color of their skin… I have a dream this evening that one day we will recognize the words of Jefferson that "all men are created equal, that they are endowed by their Creator with certain unalienable Rights, that among these are Life, Liberty and the pursuit of Happiness." I have a dream that one day every valley shall be exalted, and "every valley shall be exalted, and every hill shall be made low; the crooked places shall be made straight, and the rough places plain; and the glory of the Lord shall be revealed, and all flesh shall see it together." [...] And with this faith I will go out and carve a tunnel of hope through the mountain of despair. With this faith, I will go out with you and transform dark yesterdays into bright tomorrows. With this faith, we will be able to achieve this new day when all of God's children, black men and white men, Jews and Gentiles, Protestants and Catholics, will be able to join hands and sing with the Negroes in the spiritual of old: Free at last! Free at last! Thank God almighty, we are free at last!"	"I say to you today, my friends, so even though we face the difficulties of today and tomorrow, I still have a dream. It is a dream deeply rooted in the American dream. I have a dream that one day this nation will rise up and live out the true meaning of its creed: "We hold these truths to be self-evident, that all men are created equal." I have a dream that one day on the red hills of Georgia, the sons of former slaves and the sons of former slave owners will be able to sit down together at the table of brotherhood. I have a dream that my four little children will one day live in a nation where they will not be judged by the color of their skin but by the content of their character [...] I have a dream that one day "every valley shall be exalted, and every hill and mountain shall be made low; the rough places will be made plain, and the crooked places will be made straight; and the glory of the Lord shall be revealed, and all flesh shall see it together." [...] With this faith we will be able to hew out of the mountain of despair a stone of hope. With this faith we will be able to transform the jangling discords of our nation into a beautiful symphony of brotherhood... And when this happens, when we allow freedom ring, when we let it ring from every village and every hamlet, from every state and every city, we will be able to speed up that day when all of God's children, black men and white men, Jews and Gentiles, Protestants and Catholics, will be able to join hands and sing in the words of the old Negro spiritual: Free at last! Free at last! Thank God Almighty, we are free at last!"

== Motown Records ==
One of the top record companies of the time, Motown, had asked Martin Luther King Jr. if they could record some of his speeches. They negotiated to record King’s speech after the Walk to Freedom when everyone gathered at Cobo Arena. King asked in the negotiations that the royalties from sales of the recording go not to him but to the Southern Christian Leadership Conference (SCLC). That selfless act left a deep impression on Berry Gordy, the founder of Motown, who had been negotiating with King.

== Different Names ==
Governor George Romney officially had the day of the Walk to Freedom declared "Freedom March Day in Michigan". There are several different variations of the title "Walk to Freedom" that have been used. Locally in Detroit, it has been known by the title, King's Walk on Woodward, and the Great March. Other variations of the title that have been used include, Walk to Freedom March, Great March/Walk to Freedom, Walk for/to Freedom, Detroit Freedom Walk/March, and Great March on Detroit.

== After the March ==
Although Governor Romney had sent representatives in his place to march in the Walk to Freedom, he wanted to do more than that. A few days after the march, he joined a group of hundreds through Grosse Pointe, a wealthy suburb of Detroit, to advocate for civil rights. He was also involved with other marches, rallies, and demonstrations in Michigan and knew Martin Luther King well. The Walk to Freedom, however, did not have the huge impact on Detroit and on civil rights that the March on Washington had and the Detroit Council for Human Rights (DCHR) did not last. The DCHR tried to start up a Northern Christian Leadership Conference as a companion to the SCLC, but disagreements, particularly between Franklin and Cleage, kept the idea from becoming a permanent reality. Albert Cleage eventually left the DCHR and it seems that other differences and disagreements caused the DCHR to dissolve.

== Anniversary ==
To commemorate the 50th anniversary of the Walk to Freedom a walk was held June 22 of 2013, organised by the Detroit branch of the NAACP and the United Auto Workers. Titled,"We Shall Not Default On Our Freedom!". Thousands participated including Martin Luther King III, Detroit mayor Dave Bing and the Revs. Jesse Jackson and Al Sharpton. Unlike 1963's walk's conclusion indoors, the 2013 version concluded at Hart Plaza. Detroit NAACP president Wendell Anthony said the march "signifies that the work for freedom and justice must continue" in Detroit and worldwide.
