= Henry Kraus =

American historian (1905–1995)

Henry Kraus (November 13, 1905 in Knoxville, Tennessee – January 27, 1995 in Paris) was an American labor organizer, journalist, and historian, and a European art historian.

The son of trade unionists who moved to Cleveland after his birth, Kraus was a member of the Young People's Socialist League. Kraus attended from the University of Chicago and received B.A. and M.A. degrees Western Reserve University in 1926 and 1927. He married Dorothy Rogin Kraus (1908–2001), a Jewish socialist emigre from Poland, whom he met in high school.

== Labor organizing ==
Kraus became active in the labor movement through work with organizing Cleveland auto workers in 1930. Dorothy Kraus worked in labor movement arts and theater organizations, including the Workers' Lab Theatre.

Following the formation of the UAW, the Krauses moved to Detroit in 1936. He founded and edited the UAW's national newspaper, The United Auto Worker. He was an organizer of the Flint Sit-Down Strike and edited The Flint Auto Worker. Dorothy Kraus helped organize the UAW Women's Auxiliary and ran strike kitchens at Midland Steel, Ford's Kelsey-Hayes factory, and the Flint sit-down. Sol Dollinger and Genora Johnson Dollinger were critical of his 1947 account of the strike, The Many and the Few, and of Dorothy Kraus's role in the Women's Auxiliary.

UAW President Homer Martin fired Kraus in 1937, part of an effort to purge Communists from the UAW. The couple moved to the West Coast in 1939, where Henry Kraus helped organize aircraft workers with Wyndham Mortimer. They left the UAW after the North American Aviation wildcat strike in Engelwood, California in 1941. During the war, he worked at Consolidated Steel Corporation and the Krauses lived in an interracial housing project in San Pedro, an experience about which he wrote in his 1951 book In the City Was a Garden: A Housing Project Chronicle.

== Later life ==
After the war, the Krauses moved to New York City and, in 1956, Paris, where Kraus worked as a European correspondent for World Wide Medical News Service. He retired in 1962, after which he and Dorothy Kraus researched and wrote about medieval art together. He used the MacArthur genius grant he received in 1984 to support the research and publication of his UAW memoir, Heroes of Unwritten Story. His papers are at the Walter P. Reuther Library, Wayne State University.

== Awards ==
- 1984 MacArthur Fellows Program

== Archival Collections ==
The Henry Kraus Papers at the Walter P. Reuther Library date from 1926 to 1960. His papers reflect his attempts to organize auto workers and the early history of the United Automobile Workers from 1935 to 1941. Particularly well-documented in the collection are the Flint sit-down strike and factionalism within the UAW.

== Works ==
- The Many and the Few, University of Illinois Press, 1947, ISBN 978-0-252-01199-3
- In the City Was a Garden: A Housing Project Chronicle, Renaissance Press, 1951, ISBN 9780598555427
- Here Is Your Union: The Story of UE 340, 1952
- The Living Theater of Medieval Art, Indiana University Press, 1967 (reprint University of Pennsylvania Press, 1972, ISBN 978-0-8122-1056-9)
- "The medieval commune at Amiens as patron of art and architecture," in Gazette des Beaux Arts 78, 1971, pp. 317–30.
- Hidden World of Misericords, Authors Dorothy Kraus, Henry Kraus, Joseph, 1976, ISBN 978-0-7181-1485-5
- Gold Was the Mortar: The Economics of Cathedral Building. Routledge & Kegan Paul, 1979, ISBN 978-0-7100-8728-7
- Gothic Stalls of Spain, Authors Dorothy Kraus, Henry Kraus, Routledge, 1986, ISBN 978-0-7102-0294-9
- Heroes of Unwritten Story, University of Illinois Press, 1994, ISBN 978-0-252-06397-8
- The Acquisition of Courage: One Man's Journey to Commitment in the 1930s, Renaissance Press, 1997, ASIN B0006RMDUM
