= Chrysler Auto Strike =

1939 labor action in the US

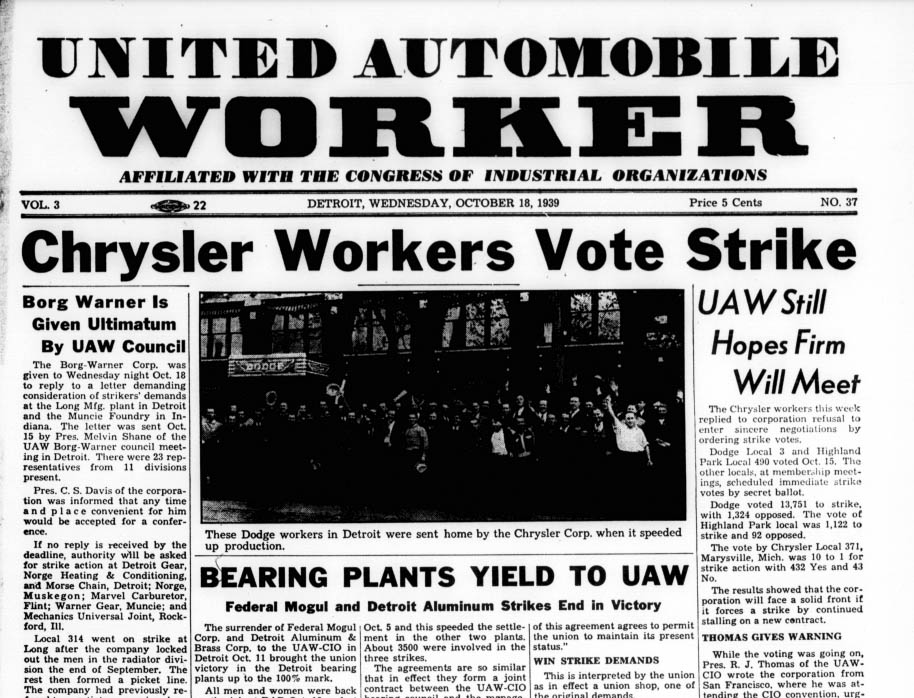
- "Chrysler Workers Vote Strike", main title on the cover of the United Automobile Worker newspaper number 37
- Date: October 1939
- Location: Dodge Main Plant, Detroit, Michigan, US
- Methods: Strikes; demonstrations
- Result: Chrysler agreed to negotiate production standards, arbitrate unsolved grievances, and rehire all 105 workers fired

Parties
Chrysler	United Auto Workers

The Chrysler Auto Strike began in October 1939 at the Dodge Main Plant in Detroit, Michigan, as a struggle between the Chrysler Auto manufacturer and the International Union, United Automobile, Aerospace and Agricultural Implement Workers of America, better known as the United Auto Workers (UAW).

== Background ==
Both the Congress of Industrial Organizations and the American Federation of Labor had each chartered a labor union for auto workers, both named the UAW. The UAW-CIO met in Cleveland, representing 370,000 members, and elected R. J. Thomas, who was a former Chrysler worker and the former Vice President of the UAW-AFL union. It had also re-elected the left-leaning George Addes as Secretary Treasurer. Walter Reuther was chosen as the leader of the union's key GM department.

In 1939, GM, Briggs, and Chrysler cancelled their collective-bargaining agreements and refused to recognize the legitimacy of the UAW-CIO and UAW-AFL. In July 1939, UAW-CIO mustered up enough supporters and toolmakers to go on strike and nearly delayed the introduction of its 1940 Chrysler models. Four weeks later, GM gave up, recognized the UAW-CIO as the sole bargaining committee, and agreed to abide to all National Labor Relation Board elections.

== Strike ==
The UAW-CIO defeated the UAW-AFL in a union election by a huge margin. Of the 44,000 votes, 37,000 votes were for the CIO, 4,000 for the AFL, and 3,000 votes for no union. As soon as the CIO solidified its place in the Auto industry, they moved quickly to stop the Chrysler Speed Up Initiative. Chrysler claimed their production speed had fallen throughout the year and claimed that the "management had cut wheel production per worker from 90 to 85 an hour."

The union counterargued that although production had been reduced, it had also laid off a large amount of helpers. The union stated, "Fender production had been cut 6 percent while the number of workers had been cut 12 percent. At Dodge Main, the union claimed that new crankshafts weighed four pounds more than the old cranks, meaning each worker who lifted 125 shafts an hour was carrying an extra two tons per eight-hour shift." Although there were over 2,700 complaints, only 800 were resolved. The workers began to challenge the foremen and supervisors. They would shout "slowdowns" and used restrooms as their command post.

On October 6, Chrysler declared that it would not allow the workers "to take into their own hands the running of the plants" and fired several stewards at the Dodge main body plant. The strike was different from the si-down strike by being a slowdown strike.

The CIO used the slowdown strike tactic because the labor law in Michigan made it tougher for the workers who were on strike to get unemployment benefits. However, during a slowdown strike, workers could not complete the quota if the previous workers could not complete theirs. That started a chain reaction, which led to a series of factories closing down. Since the shops closed and the workers were laid off, the workers were then entitled to unemployment benefits.

Homer Martin's UAW-AFL (the UAW-CIO's counterpart) encouraged 1,700 black workers to go back to work. Almost immediately, prominent black leaders such as Reverend Horace White and Senator Charles Diggs Sr. denounced the AFL and claimed the effort as a cynical effort "to invite physical violence and bloodshed" between the white and black workers. The CIO believed that the AFL was trying to bring the State Troops and the National Guard to break the CIO effort, but the State of Michigan denied any efforts to send in its troops to break the strike.

In response, Chrysler closed all of its gates except for the Conant Gates, on the Detroit side of the Plant, for the returning workers. The Chrysler spokesman proclaimed that workers "who appeared for work would get it if there was anything for them to do." Thus, Representative Clare E. Hoffman warned the Governor Luren D. Dickinson to use force to protect those who seek to return to work. Dickinson responded to the request with him by never receiving any letters and believed the State Police had adequate means and manpower to protect the Chrysler workers.

The AFL's motion had caused a racial divide, which many expected a violent confrontation when the gates were open. Police forces were dispatched to ensure the safety of returning workers. When the day came, the violence expected did not occur because of the support of the Diggs, White, Reverend Charlie Hill, and Louis Martin. The 6,000 picketers let them enter the factory without any confrontation.

Chrysler executives involved in the negotiations included Herman Weckler, who managed industrial relations for the company in the late 1930s.

== Aftermath ==
Although a few workers returned to work, it was not enough to maintain the production line, leading Chrysler to comply with the union. Chrysler conceded to the union and agreed to the negotiation of production standards and to arbitrate unsolved grievance, and to rehire all 105 men fired in early October.

== Legacy ==
The UAW-CIO had won the battle at last and had borne its first fruit. Under the leadership of Walter Reuther, who later would be elected President of the union, it grew rapidly through a series of successful strikes and political alliance. Not long after the Chrysler Strike, the UAW had set its sight on the Ford Motor Factory, which had long resisted unionization.

== See also ==
- Tool and die strike of 1939

== Bibliography ==
- Riding the Roller Coaster: A History of the Chrysler Corporation by Charles K. Hyde.
- "Walter Reuther: The Most Dangerous Man in Detroit" by Nelson Lichtenstein.
- "The Automobile in American History and Culture: A Reference Guide"by Michael L. Berger.
- "Black Detroit and the Rise of The UAW" by August Meier and Elliott M. Rudwick
