= Karthaus Township, Pennsylvania =

Township in Pennsylvania, US

Coordinates: 41°08′26″N 78°05′48″W

- Township
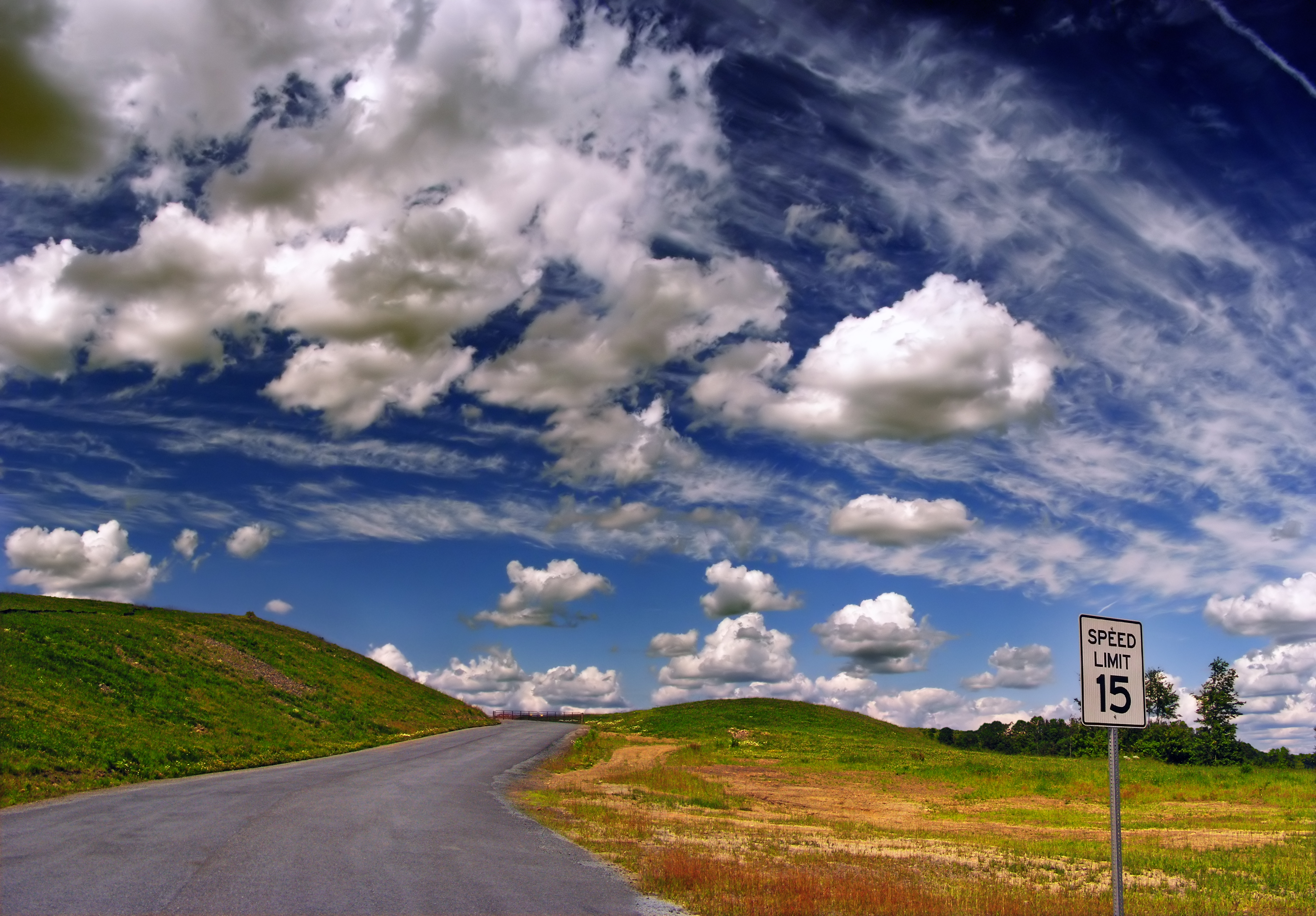
- A cloudy summer day in Karthaus Township

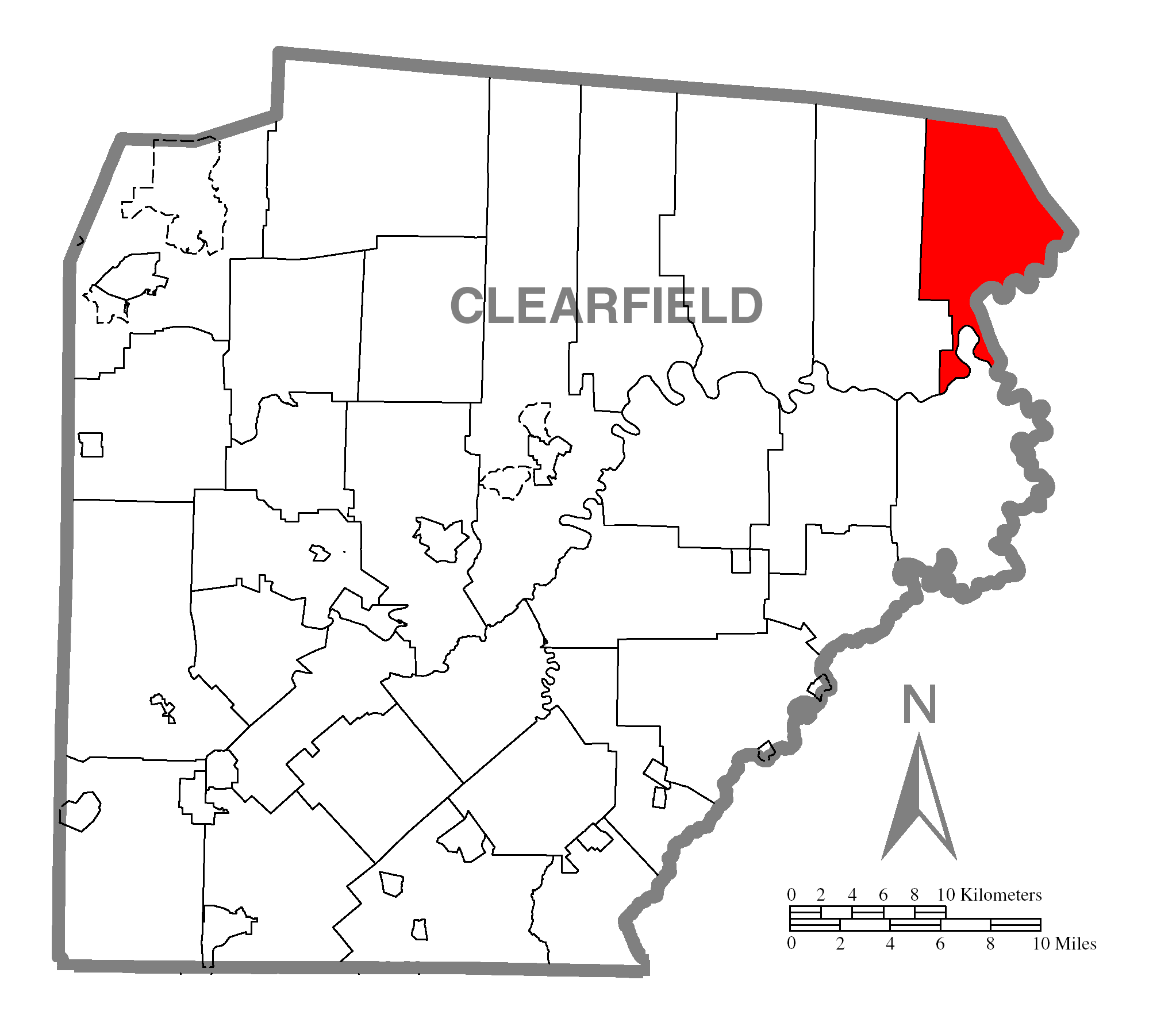
- Map of Clearfield County, Pennsylvania highlighting Karthaus Township

- Map of Clearfield County, Pennsylvania
- Country: United States
- State: Pennsylvania
- County: Clearfield
- Settled: 1814
- Incorporated: 3 February 1841

Area
  - Total: 35.78 sq mi (92.67 km^{2})
  - Land: 35.34 sq mi (91.54 km^{2})
  - Water: 0.44 sq mi (1.14 km^{2})

Population (2020)
  - Total: 819 ▲
  - Estimate (2021): 816
  - Density: 24.4/sq mi (9.41/km^{2})
- Time zone: UTC-5 (Eastern (EST))
  - Summer (DST): UTC-4 (EDT)
- Area code: 814
- FIPS code: 42-033-38784

Karthaus Township is a township in Clearfield County, Pennsylvania, United States. The population was 819 at the 2020 census.

The township was named after Peter A. Karthaus, the proprietor of a local blast furnace.

== Geography ==
According to the United States Census Bureau, the township has a total area of 36.2 square miles (94 km^{2}), of which 35.6 square miles (92 km^{2}) is land and 0.6 square miles (1.6 km^{2}) (1.66%) is water. The township is situated in eastern Clearfield County and is bordered by Centre County to the east.

== History ==
The eastern part of Covington Township was incorporated as Karthaus Township on 3 February 1841.

== Communities ==
- Belford
- Cataract
- Karthaus
- Oak Hill
- Piper
- Pottersdale

== Demographics ==
Historical population
Census	Pop.	Note	%±
2000	811		—
2010	811		0.0%
2020	819		1.0%
2021 (est.)	816		−0.4%
U.S. Decennial Census

At the 2000 census there were 811 people, 239 households, and 157 families in the township. The population density was 22.8 people per square mile (8.8/km^{2}). There were 359 housing units at an average density of 10.1/sq mi (3.9/km^{2}). The racial makeup of the township was 80.27% White, 15.41% African American, 0.12% Native American, 0.25% Asian, 0.37% from other races, and 3.58% from two or more races. Hispanic or Latino of any race were 3.70%.

There were 239 households, 25.5% had children under the age of 18 living with them, 51.5% were married couples living together, 8.4% had a female householder with no husband present, and 34.3% were non-families. 31.0% of households were made up of individuals, and 15.9% were one person aged 65 or older. The average household size was 2.38 and the average family size was 2.95.

The age distribution was 15.8% under the age of 18, 16.8% from 18 to 24, 35.5% from 25 to 44, 16.8% from 45 to 64, and 15.2% 65 or older. The median age was 31 years. For every 100 females, there were 174.9 males. For every 100 females age 18 and over, there were 190.6 males.

The median household income was $26,552 and the median family income was $31,833. Males had a median income of $24,038 versus $16,250 for females. The per capita income for the township was $13,723. About 2.7% of families and 6.7% of the population were below the poverty line, including 4.4% of those under age 18 and 11.3% of those age 65 or over.

== School districts ==
- West Branch Area School District

== Notable person ==
United Auto Workers organizer Wyndham Mortimer (1884–1966), first vice president of that union, from 1936 to 1939, and a key leader of the 1937 Flint Sit-Down Strike, was born in Karthaus.
