= Tool and die strike of 1939 =

Labor action in Michigan, U.S.

- Date: July 2, 1939-
- Goals: Union recognition
- Result: Union recognition and higher wage scale

Parties
United Auto Workers Congress of Industrial Organizations	General Motors Corporation

The tool and die strike of 1939, also known as the "strategy strike", was an ultimately successful attempt by the United Auto Workers Union (UAW) to be recognized as the sole representative for General Motors workers. In addition to representation rights, the UAW, working jointly with the Congress of Industrial Organizations (CIO), sought to resolve existing grievances of skilled workers.

== Background ==
The UAW was founded in May 1935 in Detroit Michigan, the same city in which the General Motors Company was headquartered. In 1939, the organization had limited experience in negotiations, but had found some success in previous strikes. The Flint sit-down strike, which took place from December 30, 1936, through February 1937 in Flint, Michigan, led to the first National UAW-CIO-GM agreement. This agreement, reached on February 11, 1937, recognized the UAW as the sole representative for GM employees, provided the employees were union members for a period of at least six months. The Flint strike and the ensuing agreement are seen as the beginning of increased legitimacy for the UAW.

Beginning in May 1939, the UAW-CIO General Motors Department was placed under the control of Walter Reuther. Reuther had been involved in both negotiations and strikes prior, having been the president of Local 174, which represented autoworkers in Detroit. The UAW had been experiencing infighting at the time, described as "internecine factionalism that pitted communists against conservatives." Reuther believed that for the UAW to gain recognition and legitimacy, the organization had to be entirely rebuilt. In addition, he concluded that the UAW would need to demonstrate that it was not only a disciplined, responsible organization, but that it had significant power under its control. The UAW faced obstacles beyond internal conflicts, however, and Reuther learned after assuming his new role that only six percent of all production workers were paying dues and, in Flint, only 6,000 out of 42,000 workers were paying dues. These statistics led GM to question union membership, and in turn withdraw its recognition of the UAW-CIO, effectively nullifying the 1937 agreement.

For the 25 years following its formation in 1908, General Motors Company (GM) hadn't participated in any major negotiations with labor unions. This inexperience is viewed by some as a major factor in how the company reacted to changes in political climate and the increasing role of organized labor. Headquartered in Detroit, Michigan, GM had already established itself as a multinational automaker by the 1930s. In 1939, the year of the strike, GM had a successful business year; car and truck production was increased by one-third and market penetration stood at more than 43 percent.

GM was also believed to be the employer of the UAW's "largest single bloc of potential members and the key to union revival." Reuther decided to use both the strength and growth of the industry to the union's advantage. Reuther organized tool and die makers, representing the skilled workers GM relied on in production of the 1940 models. Skilled workers were particularly loyal to the CIO and UAW due to the onset of the Great Depression and they often viewed these unions as a way to protect the integrity of their craft.

The framework for negotiations was formed prior to the strike. The UAW aimed for a new structure at GM which would ensure "orderly and responsive consideration of collective bargaining objectives, conduct of negotiations, and coordination of tactics on grievances." The strike also sought a work week of 30 hours, cessation of pay docking for workers, and formal reinstation of shop steward systems. Additionally, workers desired a greater role in determining production standards. Success in these negotiations would advance the UAW's ultimate goal of representation and legitimacy.

== The strike ==
United Action Means Victory (1939), a documentary produced by the UAW with footage from the strike

On July 2, 1939, the tool and die strike plan was approved by the UAW executive board. The strike itself was put into action on July 5. The stoppage began when Reuther called out 800 workers of the Fisher No. 21 (Fisher Body) shop which was located on the west side of Detroit. The following day, men from four other GM facilities in Detroit walked out, including the largest tool and die shop in the world, Fisher No. 23. Additional walk outs occurred in the following days, progressing to other divisions, as well as entirely different cities. By July 10, shops in Cleveland and Saginaw were shut down. While such rapid movements led to the lay offs of some workers, GM's fall production schedule began to face serious difficulties.

The strike continued to escalate over the ensuing weeks, spurred on with the help of Reuther. On July 27, 1939, the GM headquarters was surrounded with picket lines of roughly 12,000 workers. On July 30, Reuther reached out through other forms of media, denouncing the GM-Dupont partnership on the radio as well as attempting to disclose the salaries of executives Alfred Sloan and William Knudsen. The broadcasting company chose not to air this information.

From 1937 to the time of the strike, 435 strikes had occurred, largely due to union factionalism and instability. GM recognized the potential threat such strikes posed, both to public perception of the company as well as production. Shortly following Reuther's radio broadcast, GM offered to recognize the UAW-CIO "as an exclusive bargaining agent for those plants, 41 in all, where only CIO had shop committees." On August 4, 1939, GM agreed to a higher wage structure for skilled workers in an effort to halt the strike and prevent future escalation. Despite the concession by GM, the UAW still had to confirm a petition with the National Labor Relations Board to vote for representation, which didn't occur until April 1940. This was the largest election to date, containing 134,000 votes representing a total of 200,000 GM workers. Of those votes, the UAW-CIO took 68 percent, which granted a concise victory over the American Federation of Labor. The vote was the final step in the process for the UAW gaining sole representation of GM workers.

On June 24, 1940, the UAW-GM contract was formed and became the first national contract to settled accommodations between a corporation and the UAW. It contained a company–wide wage standard in addition to forming regulations and a structure of representation. The contract was particularly significant for Reuther and the UAW, having succeeded in negotiation despite the relative youth of the organization and its many political obstacles.

== Aftermath and historical impact ==
The 1939 strike granted almost immediate legitimacy in negotiation to the UAW, which is still active in the present day. Walter Reuther later led the organization as president from 1946 to 1970, and the UAW currently has nearly one million current and retired members. The strike has also been viewed as the catalyst of the relationship between the UAW and General Motors. Other strikes and negotiations followed, with some regularity, until the final UAW-GM National Agreement of 1958. The UAW would later orchestrate similar strikes against the Ford Motor Company in 1940 and 1941, culminating in a National Labor Relations Board order to Ford demanding they halt opposition to the union. The success experienced by the UAW against GM was also indicative a gradual strengthening of organized labor observed during the era.

== See also ==
- Chrysler Auto Strike
- Union-sponsored film about the 1939 Tool and Die Makers Union strike against General Motors
- United action means victory, story of the General Motors tool & die strike by International Union, UAW & (CIO) Frontier Films,
