= Pottersdale, Pennsylvania =

Unincorporated community in Pennsylvania, US

- Unincorporated community
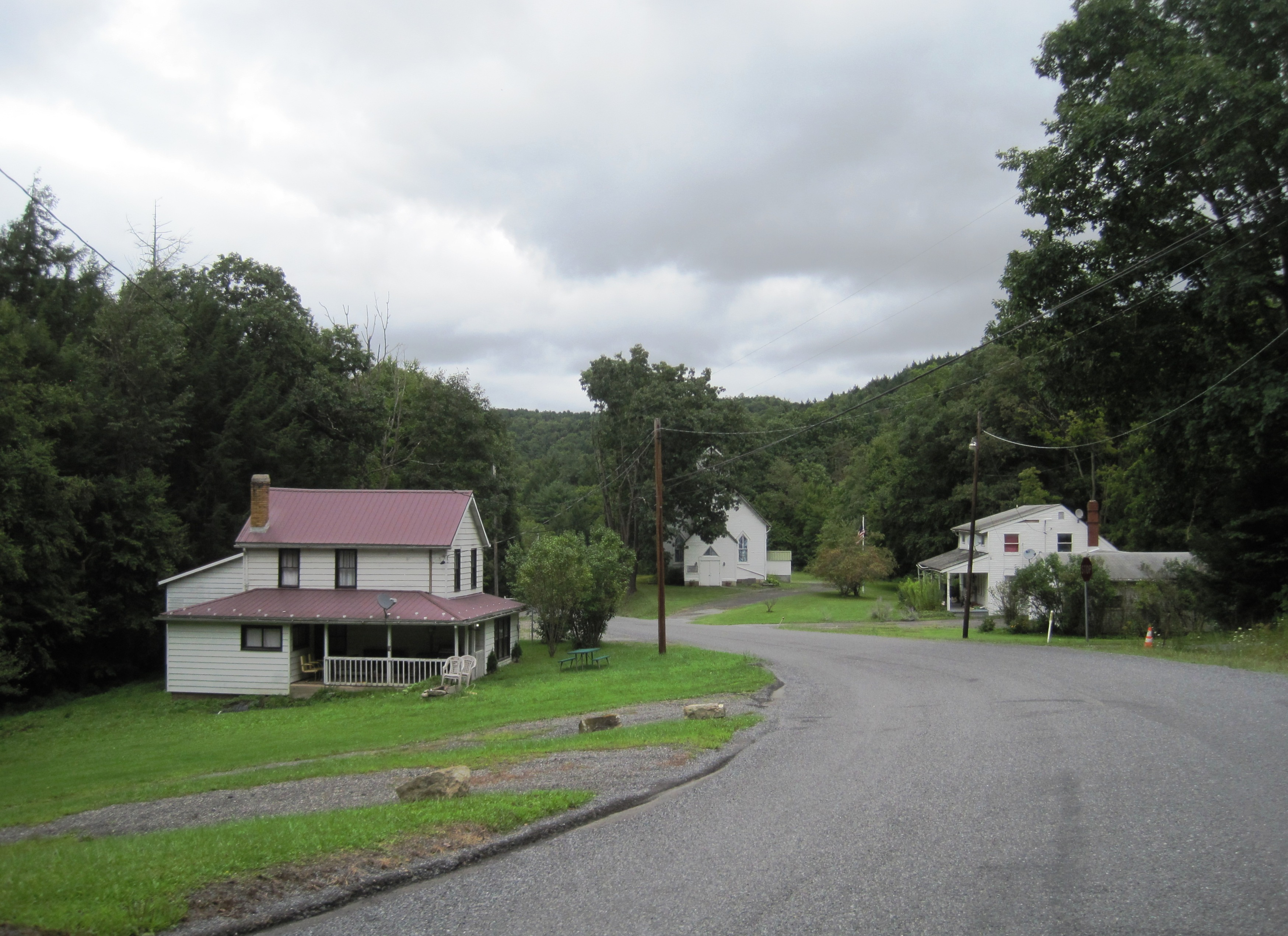
- Eastbound Pottersdale Road in the village

- Location within Pennsylvania
- Coordinates: 41°09′57″N 78°03′45″W
- Country: United States
- State: Pennsylvania
- County: Clearfield
- Township: Karthaus
- Elevation: 1,037 ft (316 m)
- Time zone: UTC-5 (Eastern (EST))
  - Summer (DST): UTC-4 (EDT)
- ZIP code: 16871
- Area code: 814
- GNIS feature ID: 1184346

Pottersdale is an unincorporated community in Clearfield County, Pennsylvania, United States. The community is located in the northeastern corner of the county in Karthaus Township, 21.9 miles (35.2 km) east-northeast of Clearfield.
