= Charles I. Krause =

American labor union leader

- Born: December 11, 1911
- Died: July 17, 2002 (aged 90)
- Occupation: labor union organizer
- Years active: 1946–1973
- Known for: active in California politics and labor unions
- Notable work: worker-friendly legislation

Charles I. Krause (December 11, 1911 – July 17, 2002) was an American labor union organizer and local executive.

One of the first 1,000 men recruited to join the nascent United Auto Workers (UAW) in 1935 by John L. Lewis, then-president of the Congress of Industrial Organizations (CIO), Krause participated in the famed sit-down strike at a General Motors plant in Flint, Michigan in 1936. Like many other Americans, Krause served as a clandestine FBI informant on communist activity in the UAW during World War II, a secret only revealed to his family and other close associates decades later. So influential did he become within the union hierarchy that the Ford Motor Company allegedly offered him a position in upper management in exchange for his renunciation of the union, which Krause rejected.

After moving to Los Angeles with his family in 1946, Krause became active in California politics, helping to consolidate the union voting bloc that proved vital to the electoral success of Democratic politicians throughout the state. He actively lobbied Sacramento for worker-friendly legislation, enjoying a particularly strong rapport with Jesse Unruh. He served two separate stints as president of UAW Local 923 located in Pico Rivera, California before retiring in 1973.

Krause died in 2002 of complications from Alzheimer's disease, having spent his final years in relative obscurity.
