= Victor G. Reuther =

American labor leader

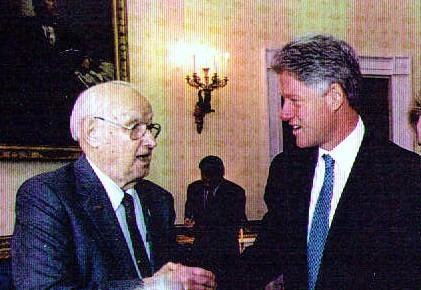
- Reuther meeting President Clinton at The White House, 1995
- Born: Victor George Reuther; January 1, 1912; Wheeling, West Virginia, U.S.
- Died: June 3, 2004 (aged 92); Washington, D.C., U.S.
- Occupation: International labor organizer
- Relatives: Walter Reuther (brother); Roy Reuther (brother)

Victor George Reuther (January 1, 1912 – June 3, 2004) was a prominent international labor organizer. He was one of three Reuther brothers (Walter and Roy) who were lifelong members of the U.S. labor movement. His older brother Walter became the president of the United Auto Workers union (UAW) and Victor became the head of that union's Education Dept. and an organizer on the international level. He was a proponent of social democracy.

== Early years ==
He was born in Wheeling, West Virginia, the son of Anna (Stocker) and Valentine Reuther, a socialist brewery worker who had immigrated from Germany. His father was a union activist and supporter of Eugene Debs, a socialist candidate for the presidency. He attended college as a freshman at West Virginia University in Morgantown.

Later, at the urging of his brother Walter, he attended what is now Wayne State University. Subsequently, he then joined Walter on an extended trip to Europe and Asia, when the brothers worked in the Gorky Automotive Plant. The Reuthers were eventually blacklisted and expelled from the Soviet Union after leading a strike, demanding safer working conditions.

Returning to the United States in 1936, Victor took a job at the Kelsey-Hayes Wheel Company, in Flint, Michigan. It was there that he started to organize the workers into a union that would eventually become the UAW. Reuther lent his support and leadership to the 1936 General Motors Strike where he faced down the billy clubs and tear gas of the violent pro-company police. He was famous for driving around Flint in a car with a loudspeaker mounted on the roof, encouraging the striking workers who were occupying the factories. Reuther was then 24.

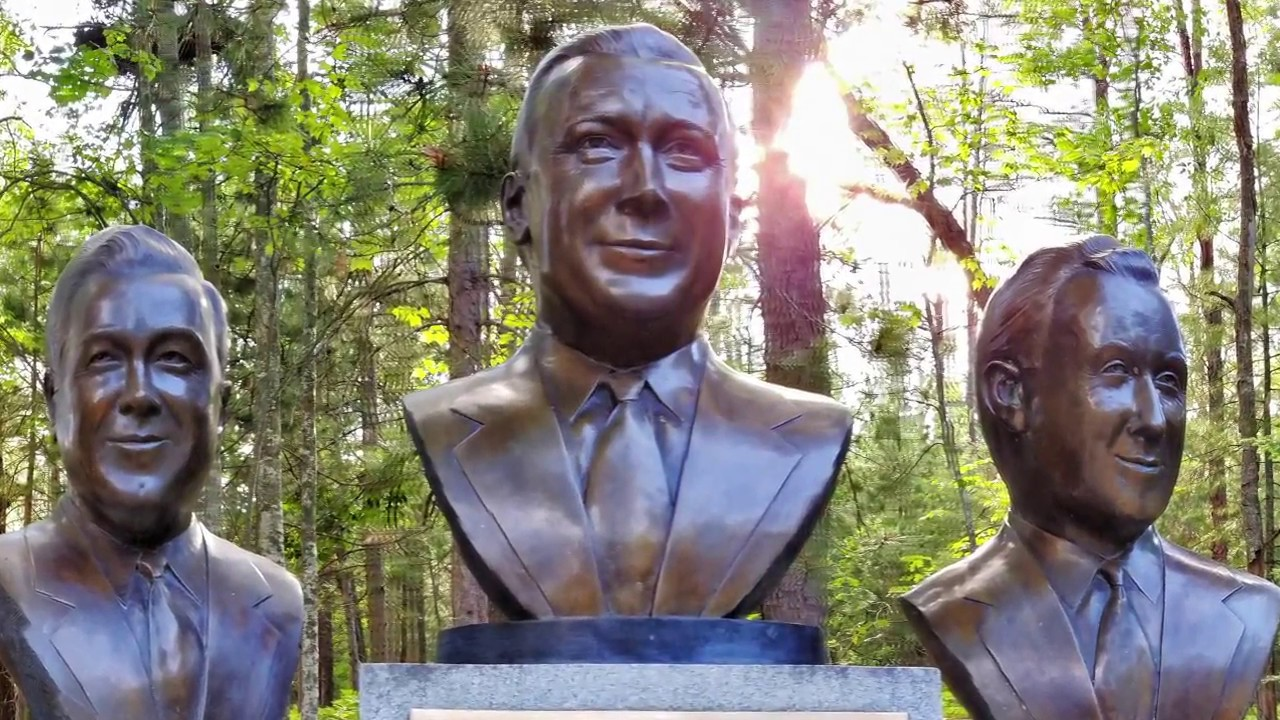
The Reuther brothers' busts at the Walter and May Reuther UAW Family Education Center in northern Michigan. From left to right, Roy Reuther, Walter Reuther, and Victor Reuther.

General Motors (GM) workers in Flint took action, and the strike eventually spread to over 100 other production facilities. During the strike, 90% of GM production was stopped for lack of parts and labor.

The strike was eventually settled in February 1937, with many gains for the workers, but Victor had to leave town with his wife, Sophie (the union's first female organizer), to evade a warrant that had been issued for his arrest by a GM-owned judge.

He and Sophie ended up in Anderson, Indiana, to support another strike taking place there and another battle against thugs, corrupt police, and public officials "in the pocket" of the corporations that were determined to wipe the union out.

== World War II ==
The United States entered World War II on December 7, 1941, and for millions of American workers, industrial production was converted to supplying war material. Reuther was among the first to sense the waste and extravagant spending that the large corporations were engaging in now that they were getting lucrative military contracts. Reuther went to Washington, D.C., and informed the Roosevelt (New Deal) Democrats of the idle machinery and infrastructure that could be turned over to military production, and subsequently there were much stricter controls on how, when, and where government allocations to private corporations could be spent.

== Postwar ==
After the war, Reuther traveled to Germany and was instrumental in the reorganization of its labor unions. Through the remainder of his life he continued to be a strong supporter of the union movement in Germany and the rest of Europe.

In 1947, his brother Walter was elected as the president of the UAW. Shortly after that Victor became the head of the union's Education Department. He was a vocal advocate of the recruitment of women, minorities, and young people into leadership positions for the union. Reuther saw the positive results that offering further education to the rank-and-file workers would bring to the workplace and to future generations of workers.

=== Assassination attempt ===
In 1949, Victor began receiving calls from the Detroit Police Department claiming that neighbors were complaining about his dogs barking. When he went outside to check on the dog, a parked car drove away from the front of his house. After the police issued a "final warning" he gave the dog to some friends. On May 24 1949, while he was reading a newspaper, a shotgun-wielding assassin fired at him through a closed window, hitting Reuther in the face and upper body. Waking in the hospital Reuther told his surgeon, "Take my eye, or my arm or leg, but spare my tongue. I've got a living to make." Reuther lost an eye and the partial use of one arm but survived. The gunman was never caught. Even though the Detroit police had some very good eyewitness accounts and descriptions, they never followed up successfully on any of the leads. One neighbor offered descriptions of the shooter to police, but he was rejected and began receiving anonymous phone calls telling him to shut up. His brother Walter had earlier survived an April 1948 incident in which he was hit by a shotgun blast through his kitchen window. Reuther happened to turn towards his wife, and was hit in the arm instead of the chest and heart. That crime also was never solved.

== Later life ==
Reuther recovered from the assassination attempt and continued to lead the union's Education Department for several more years. He was eventually named the UAW's International Director. He was active in the labor movement of many European countries, and became very well known in the Canadian union scene. His brother, Walter, was killed in a plane crash in 1970, and in 1973, Victor decided to retire and write his memoir "The Brothers Reuther and the Story of the UAW," which was published in 1976.

He continued to speak at union conventions and rallies and earned much respect for his unyielding view that working people should always be making gains in terms of wages and working conditions. During the separation of the UAW and the Canadian Auto Workers (CAW) in the mid-1980s, he was fully supportive of the Canadian workers' motives.

He felt that the UAW had been giving too much in the way of concessions to the US corporations, and it was his belief that the Canadian union would set a good example for their US counterpart. He remained active well into his declining years and died in Washington at the age of 92.

== Archives ==
His life and roles in the United Automobile Workers are documented through several archival collections at the Walter P. Reuther Library. Materials include personal papers, such as correspondence and notes, as well as administrative files relating to his activities in various UAW departments. Researchers are encouraged to find the collections at its website

== Bibliography ==
- Reuther, Sources G. "The Brothers Reuther and the Story of the UAW: A Memoir." Boston: Houghton Mifflin Company, 1976.
- Reuther, Victor G. "Die Brueder Reuther. Eine Autobiographie sowie die Geschichte der amerikanischen Automobilarbeitergewerkschaft UAW." Koeln: Bund Verlag GmbH, 1989
- Reuther, Victor G. "Verraten in Gorki. Die Tragödie der ausländischen Arbeiter in den sowjetischen Autowerken in Gorki." Bonn: Verlag J.H.W. Dietz Nachf. GmbH, 2002 (in German)
