= With Babies and Banners: Story of the Women's Emergency Brigade =

1979 film

- Directed by: Lorraine Gray
- Produced by: Anne Bohlen; Lyn Goldfarb; Lorraine Gray
- Music by: Steve Gray
- Production company: Women's Labor History Film Project
- Distributed by: New Day Films
- Release date: 1979
- Running time: 45 minutes
- Country: United States
- Language: English

With Babies and Banners: Story of the Women's Emergency Brigade is a 1979 American documentary film directed by Lorraine Gray about the General Motors sit-down strike in 1936–1937 that focuses on the role of women using archival footage and interviews. It provides an inside look at women's roles in the strike. It was nominated for an Academy Award for Best Documentary Feature.

The film was one of the first to put together archival footage with contemporary interviews of participants and helped spur a series of films on left and labor history in the US utilizing this technique. The film was also important in helping bring into view the history of American women being active in the public sphere, particularly in union and labor actions. The film was, further, ground breaking because it was produced and directed by women.

== Principal cast ==
- Genora Johnson Dollinger
- Delia Parish
- Nellie Besson Hendrix
- Mary Handa
- Babe Gelles
- Helen Hauer
- Liliian Hatcher
- Laura Hayward
- Teeter Walker
