= Wyndham Mortimer =

American labor leader (1884–1966)

United Auto Workers leader Wyndham Mortimer in August 1936

Wyndham Mortimer (March 11, 1884 – August 25, 1966) was an American trade union organizer and functionary active in the United Auto Workers union (UAW). He is best remembered as a key union organizer in the 1937 Flint Sit-Down Strike. He was the First Vice President of the UAW from 1936 to 1939. A member of the Communist Party USA (CPUSA) from about 1932, Mortimer was a critic of the efforts of the conservative American Federation of Labor to control the union and was a leader of a so-called "Unity Caucus" which led the UAW to join forces with the more aggressive Congress of Industrial Organizations (CIO).

In the spring of 1941, Mortimer's refusal to follow the anti-strike line of the UAW's governing Executive Board during a controversial work stoppage at a California aircraft factory led to his termination by the union and effectively brought an end to his career.

== Biography ==
=== Early years ===
Wyndham Mortimer was born March 11, 1884, in Karthaus, Pennsylvania, the son of a coal miner who was a member of the Knights of Labor, an early American labor union. He later recalled that one of his earliest memories of life as a young boy in Central Pennsylvania involved "walking behind parades of striking miners."

Mortimer left school at age 12 to work in the mines of Pennsylvania as a coal trapper, periodically operating trap doors in the mine shafts to allow the passage of carts and to assist with ventilation. Mortimer joined the United Mine Workers of America in 1900 and remained in the mines for several years after that date.

Mortimer joined the Socialist Party of America in 1908 after hearing a campaign speech by that party's Presidential nominee, Eugene V. Debs.

After leaving the coal mines, Mortimer worked as a rail-straightener in the steel mills of Lorain, Ohio, a brakeman on the Pennsylvania and New York Central Railroads, and a conductor for the Cleveland Railway Company. During this interval Mortimer was periodically a member of the Brotherhood of Railway Trainmen and the Industrial Workers of the World (IWW).

=== Trade union career ===
This industrial job-hopping culminated in 1917 when Mortimer was hired as a drill operator at the White Motor Company of Cleveland, Ohio, then a leading manufacturer of trucks and busses. While at White Motor, he organized his fellow workers into an independent trade union — the White Motor Union. After first seeking assistance from the Cleveland Federation of Labor for his organizing effort, without success, in the summer of 1933 he made contact with John Williamson, the CPUSA's District Organizer for Detroit. The Communist Party lent assistance to the organizing campaign and in August 1933 the White Motor Union affiliated with the Auto Workers Union (AWU), an affiliate of the Communist Party-sponsored Trade Union Unity League.

Although he never publicly acknowledged his membership, Mortimer had joined the CPUSA by 1932, according to historian Roger Keeran. Outside of his workplace he was also active in the Small Home and Landowners League in Cleveland, a short-lived mass organization of the CPUSA.

Unhappy at the presence of a new radical union in their midst, representatives of the Cleveland Metal Trades Council began circulating leaflets in November 1933 to White Motor workers, asking them to choose between the American Federation of Labor and the Communist-sponsored AWU. This appeal made headway with rank-and-file workers.

Mortimer, realizing that he faced a long and divisive fight over the issue, called a mass meeting of union members and recommended that the independent union be dissolved in favor of a new organization affiliated with the AF of L. Shortly thereafter union officials went to headquarters of the Metal Trades Council and made formal application, and Federal Local Union No. 18463 of the American Federation of Labor was thereby established.

The AF of L organizer for the Cleveland district, George McKinnon, appointed conservative trade unionists to head the new local, thereby excluding Mortimer from high office. Mortimer did, however, manage to maintain a high profile and effective direction of the local's tone and agenda as the head of the Grievance Committee of the new organization. In this capacity, he was instrumental in orchestrating weekend job stoppages until the company relented and agreed to pay time-and-a-half for Saturday and Sunday work.

In 1934 Mortimer was elected President of the Cleveland Auto Council.

Mortimer was frequently questioned about his political affiliations and loyalties and never admitted connection to the CPUSA during his time as a union organizer. When accused by a leader of the AF of L's Metal Trades Department of being a Communist in 1935, Mortimer replied:

"I will not dignify the wild charges made against me...by either denying or admitting them. Redbaiting is, and always has been, the employers' most potent weapon against those of us who believe in and fight for industrial unionism."

Mortimer and other Michigan Communists active in the trade union movement took pains to maintain discretion in this period, going so far as to hold their unit meetings in the middle of the night, the time and location of which was kept a carefully guarded secret. This mania for secrecy served to inhibit CPUSA activists from placing the question of socialism before their fellow trade unionists, effectively stifling their self-proclaimed task of radicalizing the working class from the outset.

At the 1936 annual convention of the United Automobile, Aircraft and Agricultural Implement Workers of America (UAW) Mortimer headed a successful drive to unseat Frances Dillon as President of the union. Homer Martin was elected as new President of the UAW at that convention and Mortimer was elected First Vice President of the UAW. He was the only Communist in the UAW's top leadership.

=== The Sit-Down Strike and after ===
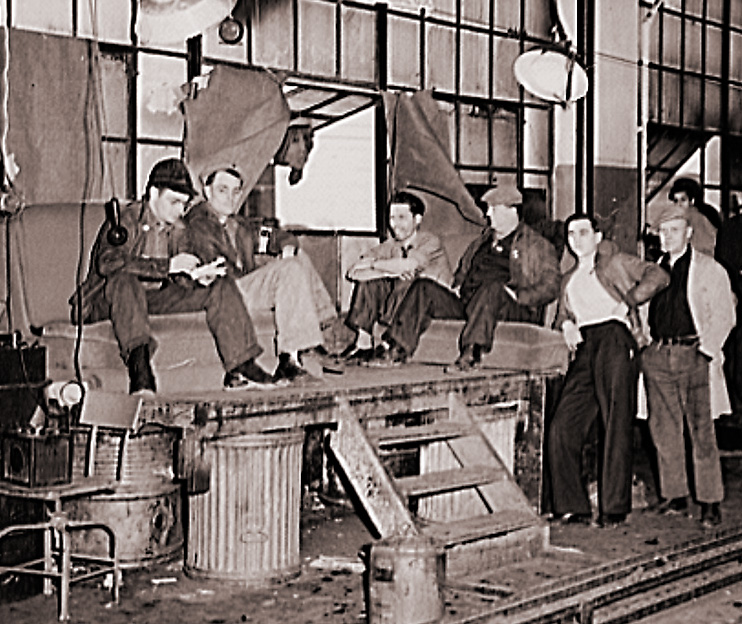
Strikers barricaded inside of Fisher Body Company plant 3 during the 1937 Flint Sit-down Strike

Mortimer was dispatched to lead organizing efforts in Flint, Michigan, activity which directly led to the high-profile and successful Flint Sit-Down Strike that began on December 30, 1936, and lasted well into 1937.

A period of factional conflict between Mortimer and UAW President Martin followed. Martin maintained close ties with Jay Lovestone, the former Executive Secretary of the CPUSA who had lost his position in a 1929 factional war only to organize a new political organization, known from the middle of 1937 as the Independent Communist Labor League. Lovestone managed to place a number of his loyal followers in important positions at UAW headquarters and persuaded Martin to begin a purge of his enemies in the ranks, including not only Communists such as Mortimer but those accused of being "tools" of the CPUSA, such as Victor Reuther and Walter Reuther.

Mortimer was expelled from the UAW in 1938 on charges levied by Homer Martin that he intended to turn over the UAW to the Communists — an accusation which Mortimer denied. This action was soon reversed following the defeat of Martin by R.J. Thomas in his bid for re-election as head of the UAW. An additional unintended consequence soon became clear, as the attack by Martin and Lovestone essentially created a grand alliance of liberal and radical unionists which would soon take the UAW out of the AF of L and into the fledgling Congress of Industrial Organizations through a so-called "Unity Caucus."

In 1938 Mortimer was again employed as a field organizer for the UAW and placed in charge of the union's West Coast organizing effort in the burgeoning aircraft industry located there. Efforts to organize the workers at the Boeing plant in Seattle, Washington, proved unsuccessful due to disagreements over jurisdiction voiced by the International Association of Machinists and Teamsters Union, but his bid to organize Vultee Aircraft for the UAW met with success.

In November 1940 a strike of some 4,000 workers took place at Vultee's Downey, California, plant. According to one account, the dispute between the company and the union originally was concerned with the matter of wages and the issue was rapidly resolved, but Mortimer abruptly broke off negotiations with the company over the secondary matters of grievance procedure and a no strike pledge. A 12-day work stoppage resulted which was finally resolved only when the War Department and Justice Department stepped in. Attorney General Robert H. Jackson issued a public charge that the strike was inspired by the Communist Party. With World War II already raging in Europe, a strike at an aircraft plant in which the most famous Communist was playing a role was seen as a positive threat to national security.

=== Mortimer's last battle ===
The tense situation was repeated in 1941 when Mortimer played a leading role in a strike against the North American Aviation plant located in Inglewood, California. During the 22 months from August 1939 to June 1941 Stalin and Hitler supported each other as war raged in Europe. Mortimer and all Communist local union officials opposed American aid to Britain's war against Germany. They supported strikes in war industries that were supplying Lend Lease aircraft to Britain. At the North American factory Mortimer and the local UAW negotiators demanded the starting pay for new employees be raised from 50 cents an hour to 75 cents, plus a 10 cents raise for their 7,000 current members. Mortimer defied the national UAW no-strike pledge and suddenly unleashed a wildcat strike on June 5. It closed the plant that produced a fourth of all the fighter planes made in the U.S. The UAW national leader Richard Frankensteen flew in but was unable to get the Mortimer to back down. So the White House intervened with the approval of national CIO leadership. President Franklin Roosevelt on June 8 sent in the California national guard to reopen the plant with bayonets. Strikers were told to return immediately or be drafted into the US Army. Mortimer was ordered by UAW headquarters to energetically exert his full influence upon the strikers to go back to work. When Mortimer refused this instruction, he was immediately fired from his union post. However two weeks later when Germany suddenly invaded the USSR on June 22, all the Communist activists suddenly became the strongest supporters of war production; they crushed wildcat strikes.

=== Later years ===
Mortimer's defiance of the Executive Board of the UAW had ended his career in the union. A brief stint followed as an organizer for the national CIO, but he resigned from this position in 1942. Thereafter he held a number of minor union posts before retiring in 1945 at the age of 61.

During his retirement years, Mortimer spent time writing and speaking on labor issues.

=== Death and legacy ===
Wyndham Mortimer died August 25, 1966, in Hawthorne, California, at age 82.

Mortimer's memoir, Organize! My Life as a Union Man, was published posthumously by Beacon Press in 1971. His papers are held by the Walter P. Reuther Library located at Wayne State University in Detroit, Michigan.

== Works ==
- Guaranteed Annual Wage. Los Angeles: W. Mortimer, 1953.
- What Problems Confront American Labor and What are the Answers? Los Angeles: First Unitarian Church of Los Angeles, 1960.
- Wyndham Mortimer Meets the Soviet Auto Workers. Detroit: Global Books, 1961.
- My Trip to the Soviet Union. Hawthorne, CA: W. Mortimer, 1961.
- Organize! My Life as a Union Man. Boston: Beacon Press, 1971.
