= Roy Reuther =

American labor leader known for UAW organizing

Roy L. Reuther
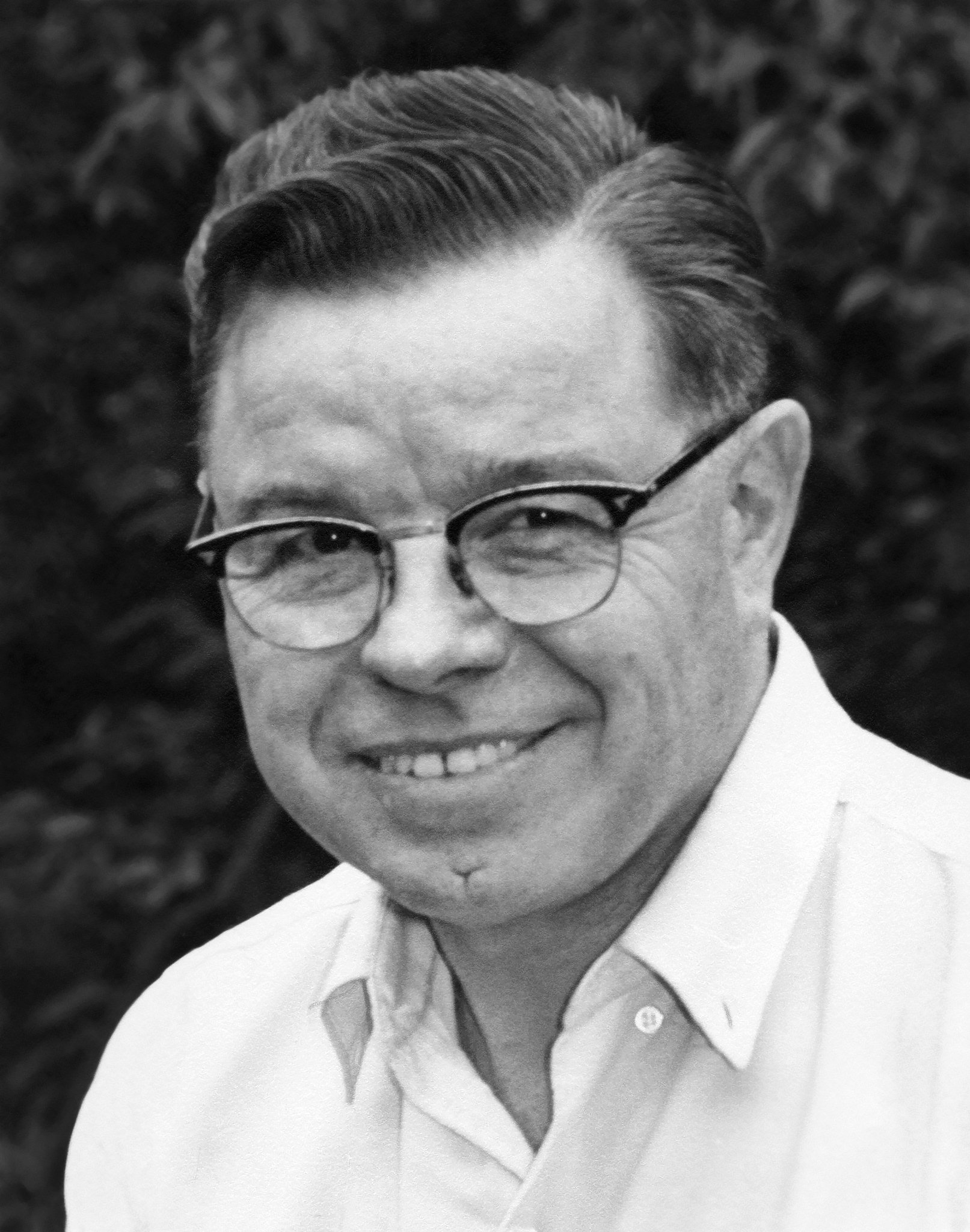
- Born: Roy L. Reuther; August 29, 1909; Wheeling, West Virginia, U.S.
- Died: January 10, 1968 (aged 58)
- Occupation: Labor organizer
- Known for: Labor movement
- Relatives: Walter Reuther (brother); Victor G. Reuther (brother)

Roy Louis Reuther (August 29, 1909 – January 10, 1968) was an American labor organizer. He was one of the leaders of the historic Flint sit-down strike that gave birth to the United Auto Workers (UAW). Along with his brothers Walter and Victor, he helped build the UAW into the most powerful industrial union in the United States. Later, as political director for the UAW, he spearheaded efforts to expand voter participation, and was deeply involved in the civil rights movement.

== Early life and education ==
Roy Reuther was born on August 29, 1909, in Wheeling, West Virginia. He was the third of four sons of Valentine and Anna (Stocker) Reuther. His father, Valentine, had been president of the Ohio Valley Trades and Labor Assembly, and was a dedicated socialist. He imparted to his sons a reverence for the labor movement and socialism.

While in high school, Reuther took an apprenticeship with an electrical firm and joined the International Brotherhood of Electrical Workers. But after he was laid off from his job in Wheeling, he joined his brothers Walter and Victor in Detroit, Michigan in 1932, where he took classes in labor education at the City College of Detroit (now Wayne State University). He also became active as an organizer for the Socialist Party, becoming the Secretary for the Detroit branch. While supporting striking workers at the Briggs Corporation., he was injured when police attacked their picket line.

In 1933–34, Reuther attended Brookwood Labor College in Katonah, New York, a residential school for labor radicals. He later became an instructor at the school.

In 1934 Reuther obtained a job as an instructor for the Federal Emergency Relief Administration (FERA), starting in Detroit and later transferring to Flint, Michigan. While in Flint he organized a government hearing into the abysmal working conditions in the auto factories. As a result, General Motors (GM) got him fired from his teaching position.

== Flint Sit-down Strike ==
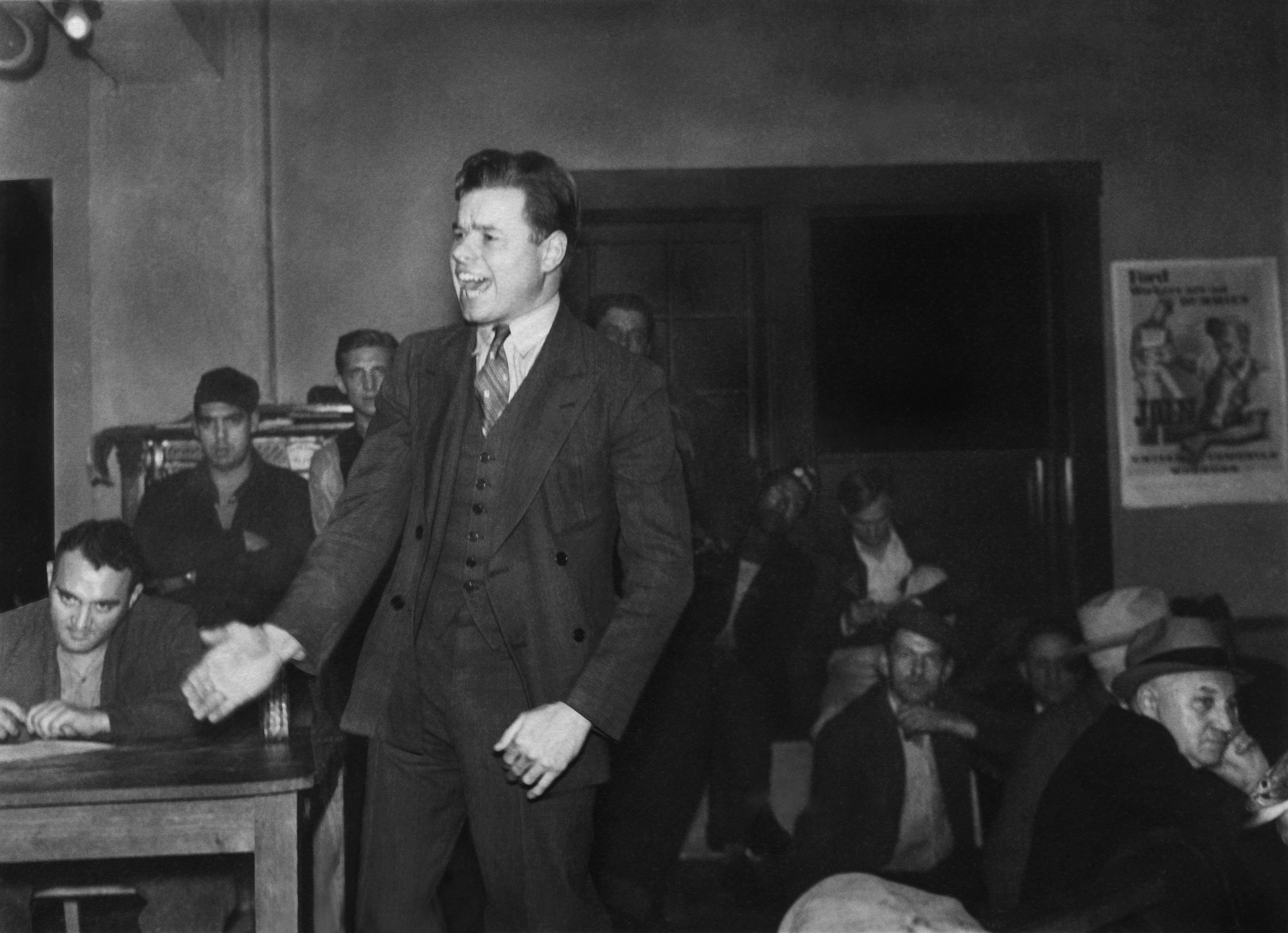
Roy Reuther exposes a Pinkerton during a union meeting.

Reuther eventually was hired at the Chevrolet Gear and Axle plant in Detroit, and became a member of the fledgling UAW. Because of his familiarity with the workers in Flint, in October 1936 he was appointed assistant director of the UAW’s organizing drive in Flint. In that capacity, he helped lead the historic 44-day Flint sit-down strike by workers that forced General Motors to recognize the UAW, and thereby gave birth to the UAW as a major industrial union. During the strike, Reuther exposed a company stool pigeon, was assaulted by company foremen, and led a march on a police station to demand the release of imprisoned colleagues. He helped formulate and execute the daring plan to capture the Chevy 4 engine plant, which broke the stalemate in the strike and paved the way for victory.

== Growth of the UAW ==
After the end of the Flint sit-down strike, GM still pursued a strategy of trying to break the union, by firing activists and instituting speed ups. As a result, between February and June, 1937, there were 120 mini wildcat strikes. Reuther was often called on by the company to settle those strikes. As the workers realized how the union could protect them, membership in the Flint Local 156 skyrocketed to 40,000, making it the biggest local in the UAW. By August, 1937, the UAW’s membership nationwide had grown to 400,000.

At the UAW’s 1937 convention in Milwaukee, Wisconsin, Reuther was a candidate for an At Large seat on the UAW’s executive board. He originally prevailed in the election. But deep factional divisions split the Union, and the UAW’s president, Homer Martin, got the credentials committee to disallow 8 delegates from Flint to swing the election to Reuther’s opponent.

At the beginning of 1938, Reuther ran for president of the Flint Local 156. But many of his supporters had been laid off in the recession that year. After Homer Martin campaigned against him, he was defeated in the election.

In 1939, Reuther became an assistant regional director in Pontiac, Michigan where there were four GM plants. When his brother Walter, who was the director of the UAW’s GM department, called a strike of GM’s skilled tool and die workers, Roy was deeply involved in organizing for the strike. Eventually the strike forced GM to recognize the UAW as the exclusive representative for workers in 41 of its plants.

=== World War II ===
During World War II, Reuther took a leave of absence from the UAW to serve as a labor information specialist with the War Production Board (WPB) in Washington, D.C. He briefly served in the U.S. Army before being recalled to the WPB. After he was transferred to the Labor Morale Division of the WPB in Los Angeles, he was instrumental in convincing workers to stay on the job despite the harsh working conditions in the aircraft factories.

=== Brother Becomes President of UAW ===
In addition to having led the GM Tool and Die Strike, Reuther’s brother Walter became famous throughout the Union because of his involvement in the Battle of the Overpass, when Ford Motor Company security personnel brutally beat him and other union organizers.

After the end of World War II, Walter led a nationwide 113 -day strike against General Motors, demanding a major increase in pay to make up for inflation during the war, and insisting that the company not increase the price of its cars. After the conclusion of the strike, Walter announced his campaign for the presidency of the UAW. At a raucous convention in Atlantic City, Reuther prevailed by a narrow margin. But the next day the opposition won a majority of seats on the Union’s executive board.

During the next year Reuther and his brothers Walter and Victor worked tirelessly to build support throughout the Union. They took a strong position against outside interference by communists, who were supporting their opposition. At the Union’s next convention in 1947, the Reuther caucus swept most positions on the Union’s executive board.

=== Assassination Attempts ===
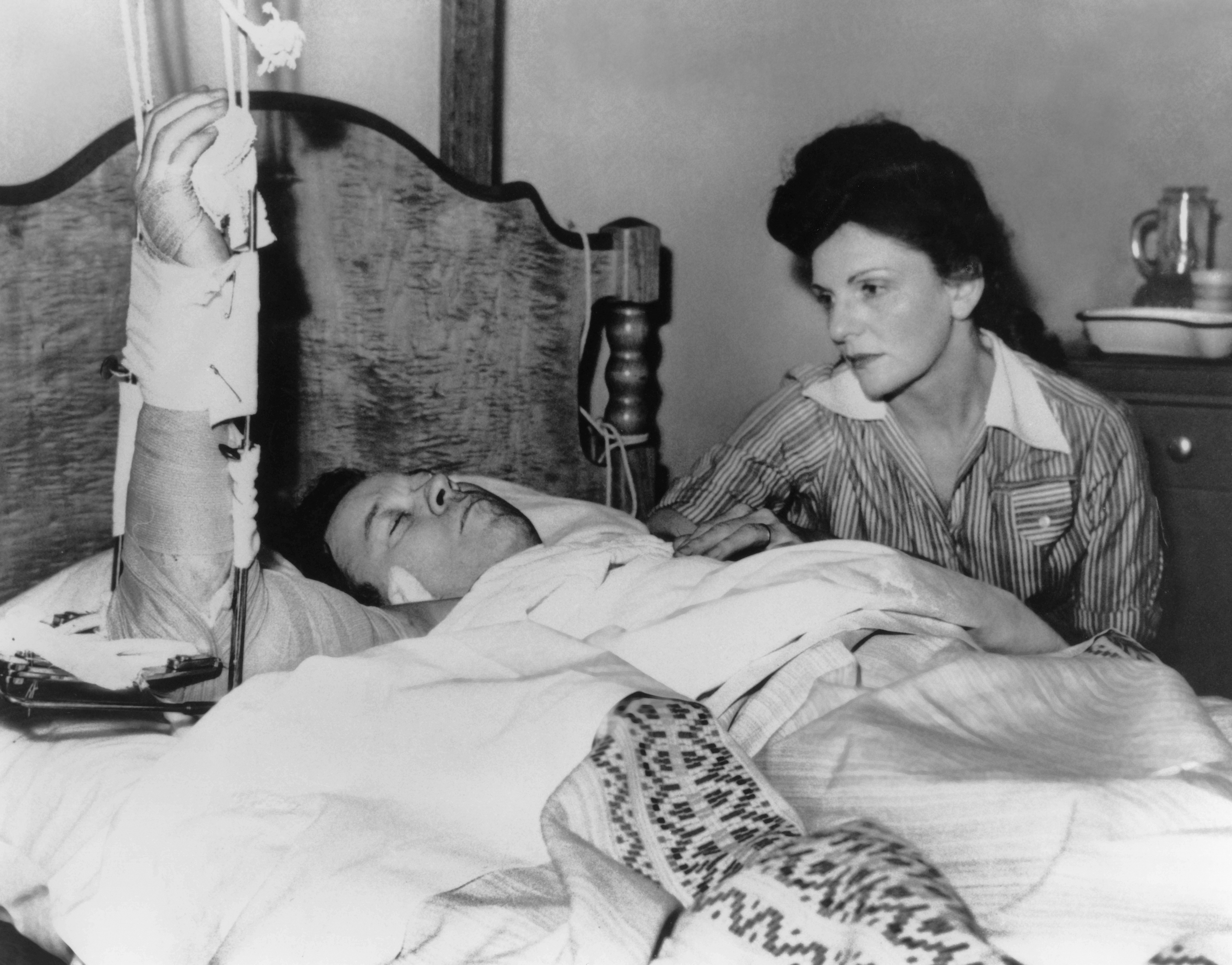
Walter and May Reuther

Following the 1947 convention, Reuther was appointed to be an administrative assistant to the new director of the UAW’s GM Department, Vice President John Livingston.

In April, 1948, while eating dinner at home, Roy’s brother Walter was struck by a shotgun blast that shattered his right arm. The next May, his brother Victor was also hit by a shotgun blast in the face and right shoulder. Both men survived the attacks.

After Victor’s shooting, Roy and his wife faced a mob of reporters outside their house. The reporters asked whether Roy was going to be next. He replied, “Naturally I’ve thought about it. The state police have offered to post a guard and I’ve accepted it. But I’m not going to go into hiding or anything like that. After Walter was shot, Vic and I talked this over and we agreed to continue the good fight. Whoever has done this represents forces that are against unionism. Whether they are employers, fascists, or Communists makes no difference. This battle can’t be fought by resigning.”

For the next decade, Reuther had to endure oppressive security measures. The window pane in his front door had bullet proof glass, and there were bullet proof metal Venetian blinds on all the windows. A K-9 trained German shepherd police dog patrolled three sides of the house. For many years, an armed bodyguard accompanied Reuther wherever he went.

The UAW appealed to the FBI to investigate the shootings, but J. Edgar Hoover refused. In January 1954 a Detroit prosecutor obtained a confession from Donald Ritchie that he had participated in Walter’s shooting at the best of a gangster named Santos “the Shark” Perrone, a Sicilian mobster who was afraid the UAW would interfere with his gambling operations in their plants and his lucrative scrap metal contracts with the Briggs Corporation. But Ritchie escaped to Canada and subsequently renounced his confession. No one was ever convicted of the attacks on Roy’s brothers.

== Political activities ==
In 1949, Reuther was appointed an administrative assistant to his brother Walter, and the director of the UAW Citizenship Department. In that capacity, he oversaw the Union’s political and legislative programs. In particular, he worked to establish political committees in all UAW Locals, and to encourage UAW members to register and vote. Discontinuing his participation in the Socialist Party, he moved to establish an alliance between the UAW and the liberal wing of the Democratic Party.

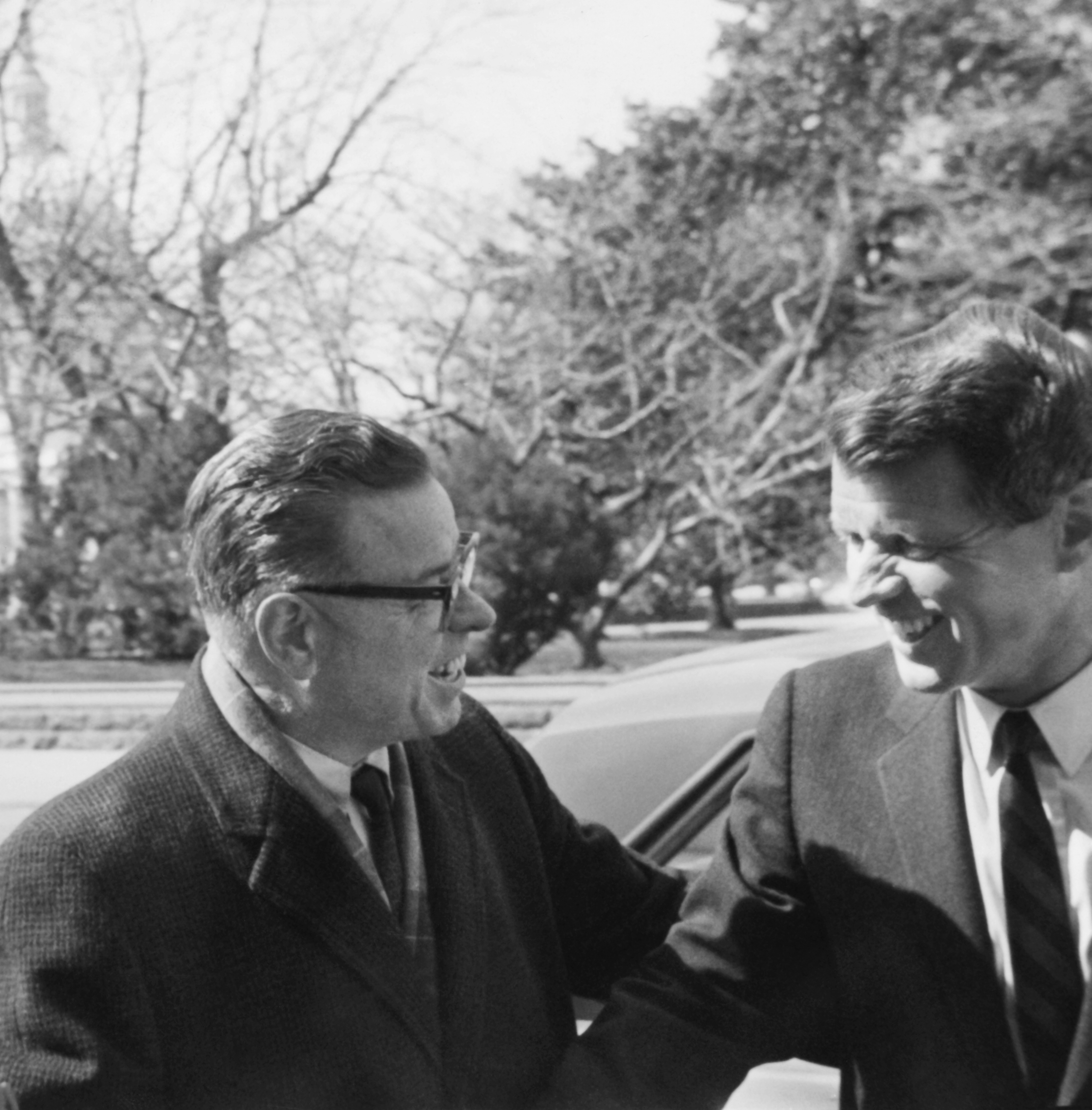
Roy Reuther and Bobby Kennedy

In 1960, Reuther worked to help get the Democratic presidential nomination for Senator John F. Kennedy. After the Democratic Convention in Los Angeles, California, he was appointed to serve as Vice Chairman of the National Voter Registration Committee for the Kennedy presidential campaign. Responsible for the day-to-day operations of the committee, he spearheaded efforts to register 500,000 new voters, including voters in minority communities. In that capacity, he worked closely with JFK’s campaign manager, Bobby Kennedy. These efforts ultimately proved crucial in helping JFK carry Illinois and Texas to win the presidency.

In 1962 and 1964, Reuther was appointed by AFL-CIO president George Meany to direct voter registration and get-out-the-vote efforts for the entire labor movement. He continued to work closely with Attorney General Bobby Kennedy during this period.

In 1963, President Kennedy appointed Reuther to serve on a National Commission on Registration and Voter Participation, chaired by Richard Scammon. The Commission later presented its report to President Lyndon Johnson, calling for abolition of literacy tests and the poll tax, which historically had been used to disenfranchise Blacks; making registration easily accessible to everyone, with residency requirements reduced and registration periods extended close to election day; and making it easier for people to vote, including extending voting hours and expanding the availability of absentee ballots.

=== Civil Rights ===
Throughout the sixties, Reuther also was deeply involved in supporting the civil rights movement. In 1959, while lobbying to reform the filibuster rule to make it easier to pass civil rights legislation, he had a public confrontation with Robert “Bobby” Baker, the chief aide to then Senate Majority Leader Lyndon Johnson. Reuther complained that Johnson and Baker were twisting arms to get Democratic Senators to oppose reform of the filibuster rule.

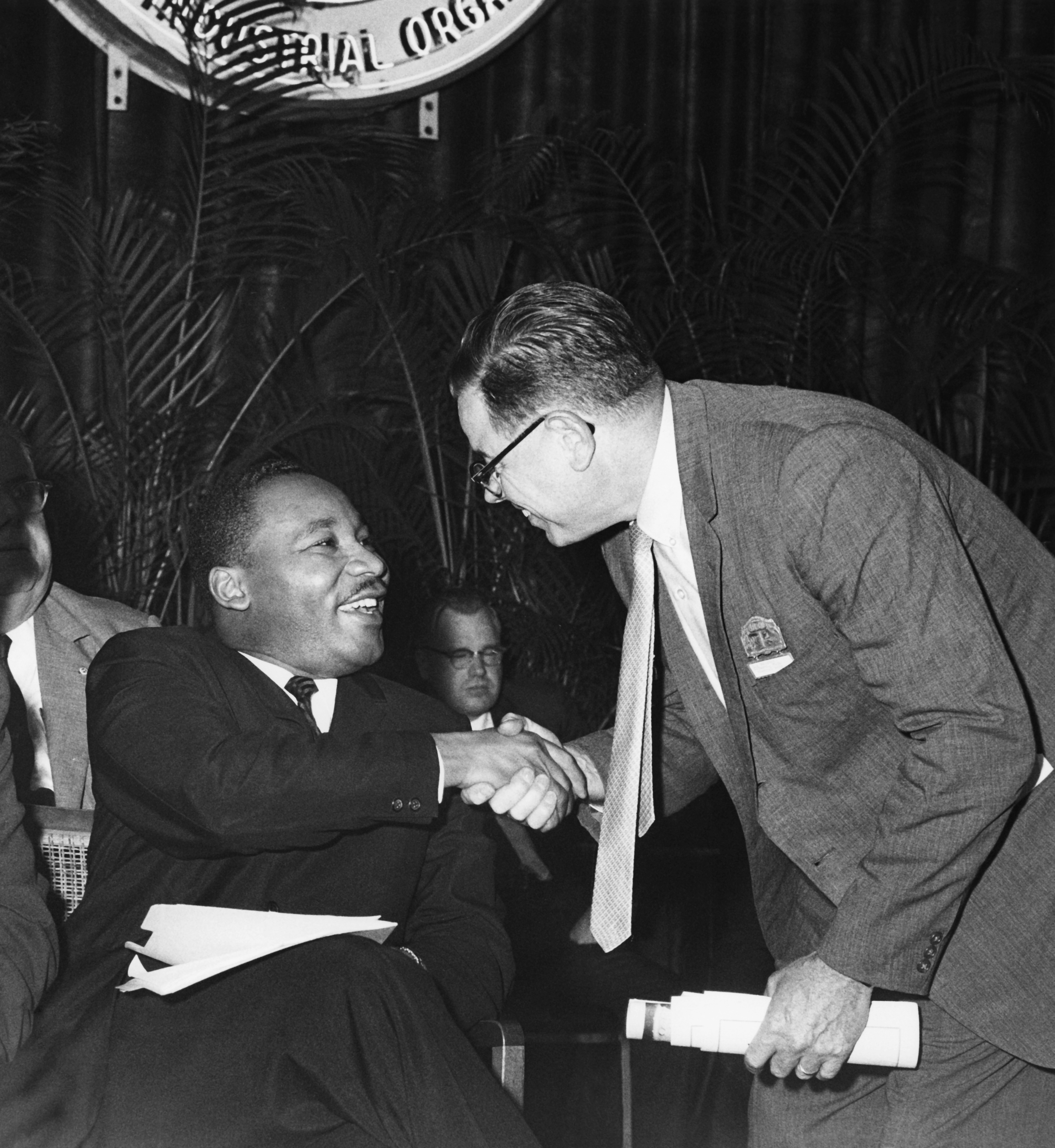
Martin Luther King, Jr. and Roy Reuther

Reuther subsequently participated in the major marches in support of civil rights, including the Walk to Freedom in Detroit, the March on Washington, the march for voting rights in Selma, Alabama, and the Walk to Freedom in Jackson, Mississippi. He was actively involved in demonstrations and lobbying for the Civil Rights Act of 1964 and the Voting Rights Act of 1965, and was present when President Johnson signed those historic pieces of legislation into law. Reuther also attended funerals for martyrs of the civil rights movement, including Medgar Evers, James Reeb and Viola Liuzzo. During the funeral procession for Medgar Evers, angry whites spit on him and called him a “race traitor.”

=== Farmworkers ===
Reuther was the first national labor leader to go to Delano, California to support Cesar Chavez and the United Farm Workers Union (UFW). He convinced the UAW to provide crucial financial support to the UFW. Later, Reuther went to the Rio Grande Valley in Texas to support striking melon pickers who had been brutalized by Texas Rangers. The Supreme Court subsequently ruled in Allee v. Medrano that the Texas Rangers had conspired with growers to break the farmworker's strike, and enjoined them from interfering with the farmworkers’ civil rights.

In 1969, the UFW built a new headquarters at a site in Delano called The Forty Acres. They named their new union hall after Reuther. A plaque on the hall reads, “In memory of our brother Roy Reuther who understood our struggle.”

== Personal life ==
Reuther married Fania Sonkin in June, 1944. They first met at Brookwood Labor College where she also was a student. A member of the Young People’s Socialist League (YPSLs), she later was involved in supporting the UAW during the Flint sit-down strike, participating in the Women’s Emergency Brigade.

Roy and Fania had two sons, David and Alan, born in 1946 and 1949 respectively.

=== Death ===
Reuther had a mild heart attack in December, 1967. While recuperating at home, he began to have chest pains during the morning of January 10, 1968. While being driven to the hospital, he had a massive heart attack and died. He was 58 years old.

Reuther’s memorial service was attended by 600 persons, including 20 U.S. Senators and members of Congress. Bobby Kennedy also attended the service, and broke down crying. The first African American Judge on the Sixth Circuit Court of Appeals, Wade McCree, eulogized Reuther saying: “Tough-minded honesty, all embracing humanity, indefatigable energy, self-effacing participation, great good humor, these were some of the qualities he contributed to his many community activities which others today will relate in detail.” Reuther’s ashes are buried at the UAW’s education center near Black Lake, Michigan.

== Legacy ==
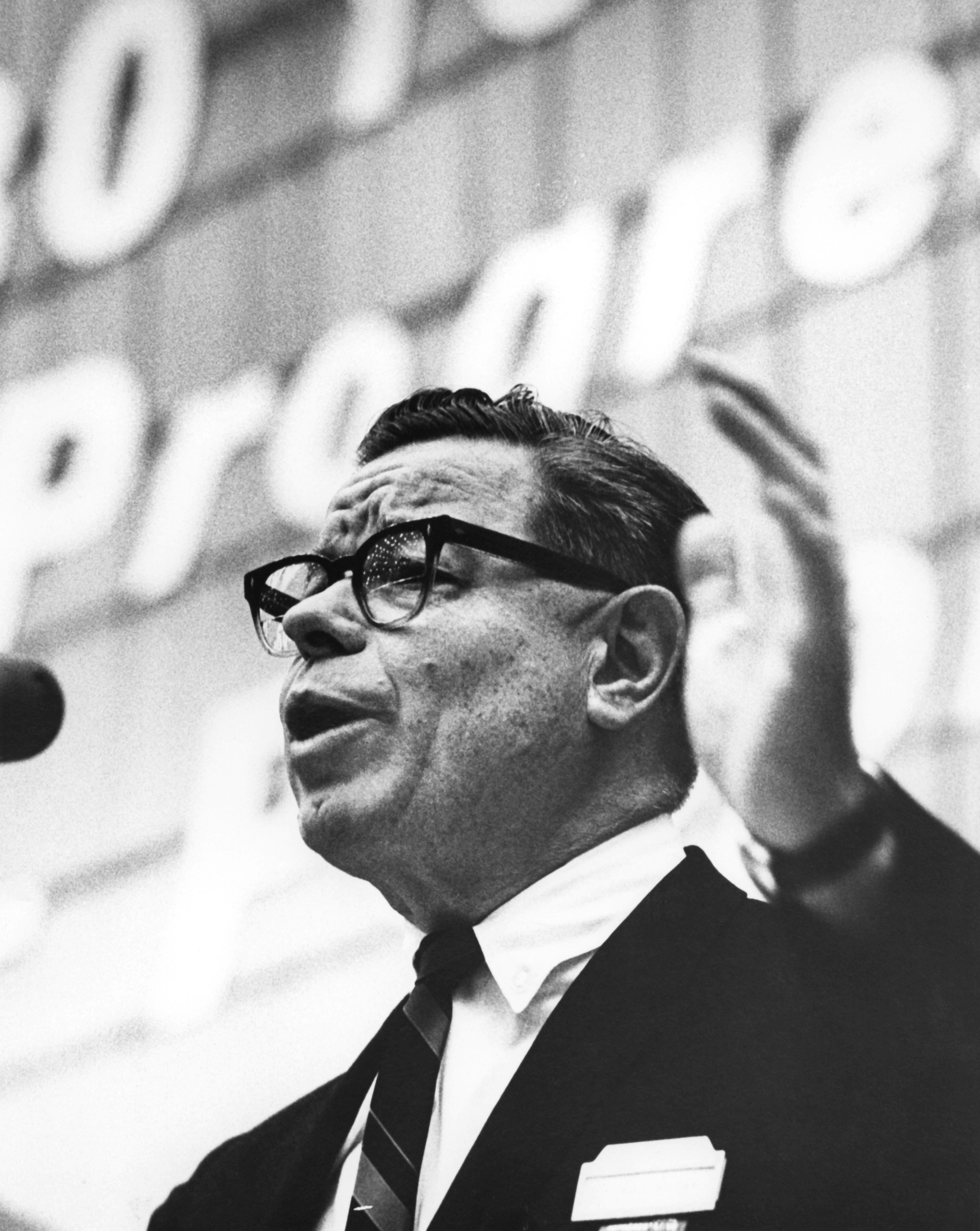

Reuther’s efforts during the Flint sit-down strike helped give birth to the UAW. His subsequent work for the Union contributed to its growth into the most important industrial union in the country. As political director for the UAW, he helped make the Union a preeminent force for progressive policies in the United States. He spearheaded efforts to increase voter participation. He also worked for passage of major civil rights legislation during the sixties, and provided vital support to the farm workers union.

=== Archives ===
Roy Reuther’s life and roles in the UAW are documented through several archival collections at the Walter P. Reuther Library, Archives of Labor and Urban Affairs at Wayne State University in Detroit. Materials include personal papers, such as correspondence and notes, photographs, administrative files relating to his activities as political director for the Union, and other types of records. Researchers are encouraged to find the collections at its website.
