= Midland Steel Products =

Midland Steel Products was an American vehicle frame manufacturer located in Cleveland, Ohio that was in business from 1893 to 2003. MSP was the last such American company. At the time of their closing, they employed 250 workers, down from their highest labor force total of 1500 in the 1970s. The last CEO was Salomao Ioschpe, associated with the Brazilian company Iochpe-Maxion. The factory employed some of the biggest metal forming presses in North America, with presses ranging from 400 tons to 7000 tons. It had state of the art heat treating equipment and held a patent for a method of induction heat treating.

Before the UAW480 strike prior to 1990, Harry Esling was President, Dennis Puening was the Controller with Joe Szudarek as his assistant (216-267-5656).
