= Herman Weckler =

American automobile industry executive

Herman L. Weckler (August 31, 1888 - January 28, 1970) was an American automobile industry executive. He spent 20 years at General Motors, rising to lead the Buick division. He joined Chrysler in 1932, and spent 21 years there. He managed industrial relations there in the late 1930s, a time of turmoil with autoworker unions. He eventually became vice president and general manager (the second highest position in the company) until retiring in 1953.

Weckler died at age 81 in Detroit in 1970. His obituary in The New York Times stated that his colleagues considered him "a master producer of automobiles and plants in which to build them."
