= Genora Johnson Dollinger =

American union organiser (1913–1995)

- Born: Genora Albro; April 20, 1913; Kalamazoo, Michigan, US
- Died: October 11, 1995 (aged 82); Los Angeles, California, US
- Other names: Joan of Arc of Labor
- Known for: Union organizing
- Spouse: Kermit Johnson (m. 1930)
- Children: 2

Genora Johnson Dollinger (April 20, 1913 – October 11, 1995) was an American union organizer and labor activist, best known for helping to organize the Flint sit-down strike in December 1936. Dollinger organized both the Women's Auxiliary and the Women's Emergency Brigade in the strike, who helped United Auto Workers in labor fights across the country. Dollinger was inducted into the Michigan Women's Hall of Fame in 1994.

== Life and work ==
Genora Albro was born on April 20, 1913. She grew up in Flint, Michigan, and went to Flint Central High School. She married Kermit Johnson, who then was a factory worker at General Motors, in 1930. Soon after having her first child, she contracted tuberculosis, and during her recovery in the hospital, she read up on worker's rights and socialism. In 1931, she and Johnson went on to form the Socialist Party of Flint.

Dollinger helped organize the Flint sit-down strike, which ran from 1936 through 1937 in response to poor working conditions at the GM plant. Worker complaints at the time included soaring temperatures in the factory, threats of being fired, long shifts, and sexual harassment of women. During the strike, Dollinger organized the Women's Auxiliary, which provided food and childcare to families of the striking workers.

On the night of January 11, 1937, Dollinger organized the Emergency Brigade to protect strikers inside the factory, enabling a takeover of the plant for 10 days. Liz Svoboda states that the all-female Emergency Brigade "immediately distinguished itself as an organization of women uninterested in domestic responsibilities", and adds that Genora "said that she would not use the word women in the title of the brigade lest someone thought they were there to feed and cloth[e], not fight in the streets. The women of the EB carried bats, cudgels, chains, and whips under long winter coats. They wore matching red berets and armbands to stand out in crowds and promote solidarity".

Dollinger had to be "dragged from the protests", earning her the nickname "Joan of Arc of Labor". The strike "crippled" GM, and the company's eventual settlement was considered a critical victory for the United Auto Workers labor union.

After the strike, Dollinger was unable to find work due to being blacklisted. She moved to Detroit, taking a job at the Briggs Manufacturing Company and became Chief Steward of an all-women's chapter of the local UAW union. Dollinger was the victim of battery, having been beaten with a lead pipe one night in her home. Later investigation by Senator Estes Kefauver determined that corporate leaders hired the Mafia to attack Dollinger along with other UAW officials.

Dollinger ran for the United States Senate in 1948, becoming the first woman in Michigan to do so. She served as the development director of the Michigan American Civil Liberties Union in the 1960s.

== Death and legacy ==
Dollinger died at Cedars-Sinai Medical Center on October 11, 1995.

Dollinger was featured into the 1979 documentary With Babies and Banners: Story of the Women's Emergency Brigade. She also appeared in the BBC documentary The Great Sitdown Strike.

Dollinger was inducted into the Michigan Women's Hall of Fame in 1994.
