= Flint sit-down strike =

1936–37 labor strike at the General Motors plant in Michigan

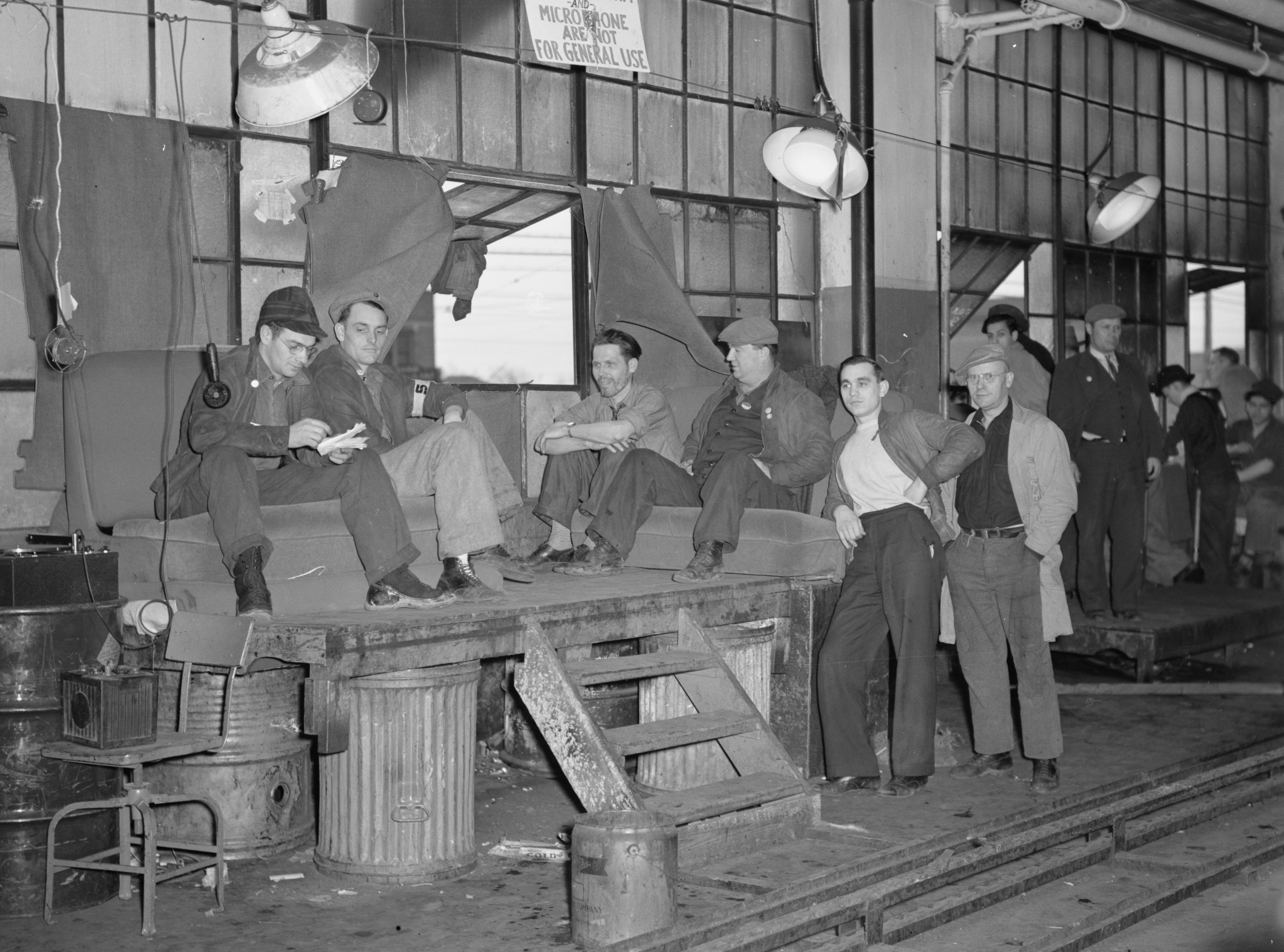
- Sit-down strikers guarding window entrance to Fisher body plant number three. Photo by Sheldon Dick, 1937.
- Date: December 30, 1936 – February 11, 1937
- Location: Flint, Michigan
- Result: Recognition of the UAW

Parties
| United Automobile Workers National Guard | General Motors Flint Police Department |

Number
| 136,000+ GM workers | |

The Flint sit-down strike, also known as the General Motors sit-down strike, was a sitdown strike at the General Motors plants in Flint, Michigan, United States, in which thousands of workers occupied the plants for 44 days, from December 30, 1936 to February 11, 1937.

After hostile clashes between strikers and Flint police, Michigan governor Frank Murphy, with the support and counsel of president Franklin D. Roosevelt, refused to use force against the strikers, and sent in the Michigan National Guard to protect the workers from police and company guards, until an agreement was reached.

The strike changed the United Automobile Workers (UAW) from a collection of isolated local unions on the fringes of the industry into a major labor union and led to the unionization of the American automobile industry.

== Background ==
GM employed 208,981 hourly workers before the Great Depression. These workers were paid around $1,195 annually. After the Great Depression jobs were increasing, but GM had 30,000 fewer employees than before the Great Depression. The pay was increasing nationwide in 1936, but at GM the pay was stagnant. Work Progress estimated for a four-person family $1,434.79 was needed. GM's records document that the annual average for full-time workers was $1,200 to $1,300. Additionally, workers were required to work at a faster pace to make up for the loss from the Great Depression.

The United Automobile Workers (UAW) labor union had only just been formed in 1935 and held its first convention in 1936. Shortly thereafter the union decided it could not survive by organizing campaigns at smaller plants as it had in the past. Instead it would organize automobile workers and go after the biggest and most powerful employer, General Motors Corporation. It would do this by focusing on GM's most valuable plants, which were in Flint, Michigan. As stated by Henry Kraus, a UAW organizer of the strike, "It was the heart-and-nerve center of the vast combine. Creators of fortunes, incomparable benefactor to the chosen few, prize milch-cow of America's most patrician family, the du Ponts, whose 10,000,000 shares of GM stock assured them a one-fourth cut of the corporation's unabating profits, whatever happened in this central city of the corporation, in this non-descript over-size village, reverberated throughout the financial capitalists of the nation". The importance of these plants to GM cannot be overstated: the production plants in Flint were essential to the multiple lines of GM cars, and to the cars of GM's subsidiary companies like Chevrolet and Buick. As explained by Henry Kraus, "The great concentration of autoworkers in Flint was not at the body plants but at Chevrolet and Buick which employed 14,000 and 16,000 men respectively – the largest of all general Motors' 60-odd factories". Another Chevrolet factory, Plant No. 4, would be critical to the sit-down strike as it produced the engines for all Chevrolet cars sold at the time. These plants were vital to production and strikes would cripple GM production throughout the country. The UAW had only recently separated from the much larger union, The American Federation of Labor (AFL).

Organizing in Flint was a difficult and dangerous plan. GM controlled city politics in Flint and kept a close eye on outsiders. As Wyndham Mortimer, the first UAW officer put in charge of organizing the campaign in Flint, entered the town, he was noticed. The day after he entered Flint, in early June 1936, he was being followed by people who were probably from GM. "When he went through the front door, the other put his paper down and followed him out into the street. And thereafter, he or one of two others always managed to be with him".

GM also maintained an extensive network of spies throughout its plants. Mortimer concluded after talking to Flint auto workers that the existing locals, which had only 122 members out of 45,000 auto workers in Flint, were riddled with spies. He decided that the only safe way to organize Flint was to bypass those locals. Mortimer, Eric Branoff, Roy Reuther, Henry Kraus, and Ralph Dale began meeting with Flint auto workers in their homes, keeping the names of new members a closely guarded secret from others in Flint and at UAW headquarters.

As the UAW studied its target, it discovered that GM had only two factories that produced the dies from which car body components were stamped: one in Flint that produced the parts for Buicks, Pontiacs, and Oldsmobiles, and another in Cleveland that produced Chevrolet parts. The union planned to strike these plants after the New Year, when Frank Murphy would become Governor of Michigan.

== The strike ==
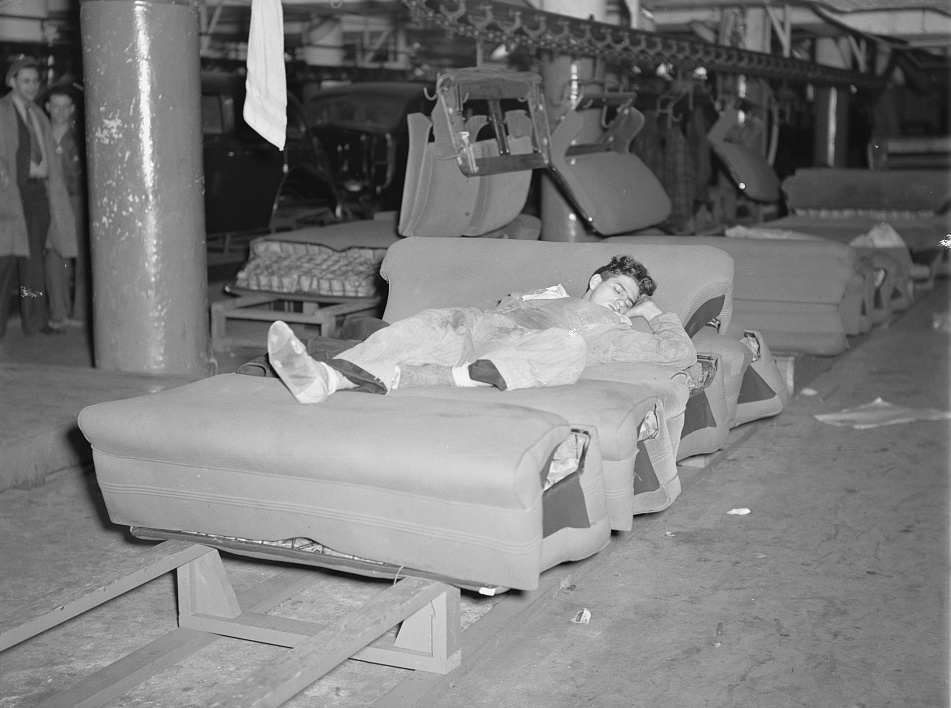
Young striker off sentry duty sleeping on assembly line of auto seats

Events forced the union to accelerate its plans when the workers at Cleveland's Fisher Body plant went on strike on December 28, 1936, due to two brothers being fired from the assembly line. The UAW immediately announced that it would not settle the Cleveland strike until it reached a national agreement with GM covering all of its plants. At the same time the union made plans to shut down Fisher #1 in Flint. Genora Johnson Dollinger was one of the main organizers and protesters for the Flint sit-down. Dollinger also organized the all-female Emergency Brigade to protect strikers inside the factory. Robert Travis was the UAW organizer during the strike. On December 30, at 8:00 AM, the union learned that GM was planning to move the dies out of Fisher #1. UAW lead organizer Bob Travis immediately called a lunchtime meeting at the union hall across the street from the plant, explained the situation, then sent the members across the street to occupy the plant. The Flint sit-down strike began.

In a conventional strike, union members leave the plant and establish a picket line to discourage other employees from entering, thus preventing the employer from operating. In a sit-down strike, the workers physically occupy the plant, keeping management and others out. By remaining inside the factory rather than picketing outside it, striking workers prevented owners from bringing strikebreakers to resume production. It was in some ways easier to maintain the morale of participants in a sit-down than in a conventional strike. The strikers were removed from outside pressures and the hostility of the community that their action might have induced. Bad weather did not constitute a problem for sit-downers as it did for the pickets in an outside strike.

The Flint sit-down strikers set up their own civil system within the strike. A mayor and other civic officials were elected by the workers to maintain order within the plant. Departments included Organized Recreation, Information, Postal Service, and Sanitation. All rules were enforced by what was called a "Kangaroo Court" by the workers. Any person who broke the rules was given a trial, and punishments ranged from washing dishes to expulsion from the plant (in the most extreme cases). It was important for the strikers to maintain order in the plant, because if property damage occurred, the Governor would intervene with the National Guard. The civic government also ensured a steady stream of supplies from friendly vendors outside the plant. Most of the meals for the approximately 2,000 workers occupying the plant were provided free of charge by a diner across the street.

== Spread of the strike ==
Once the strike had been established in Flint, workers at other General Motors plants joined the strike:

- December 31: Fisher Body and Chevrolet plant in Norwood, Ohio. Workers at the Guide Lamp plant in Anderson, Indiana conducted a sit-down strike.
- January 4: Sit-down strike at Toledo, Ohio's Chevrolet plant
- January 5: Sit-down strike at Chevrolet and Fisher Body in Janesville.
- January 8: Sit-down strike at the 3800-worker Cadillac plant in Detroit, organized by Walther Reuther's West Side local.
- January 12: Sit-down strike at the Detroit plant of Fleetwood, a Cadillac supplier. Around ninety workers began the sit-down, which held until January 15, when it was converted into a conventional strike. Reuther called the takeover a protest of police brutality in Flint on January 11.
- January 13: A conventional strike at St. Louis Fisher Body and Chevrolet followed an unsuccessful attempt at a sit-down the prior day. Striking workers were supported by union members from Kansas City.
- January 25: Reportedly a strike at Oakland, California's Fisher Body and Chevrolet, though GM attributed the stoppage to lack of materials.
- February 1: Occupation of Chevrolet No. 4 plant in Flint.

By January 25, the strike had major secondary effects throughout General Motors' chain of production, leading fifty GM plants to close and suspending work for 150,000 employees.

Protests in solidarity with the strike were held at the GM Buildings in New York City (February 1) and Detroit (February 6).

== Resistance ==
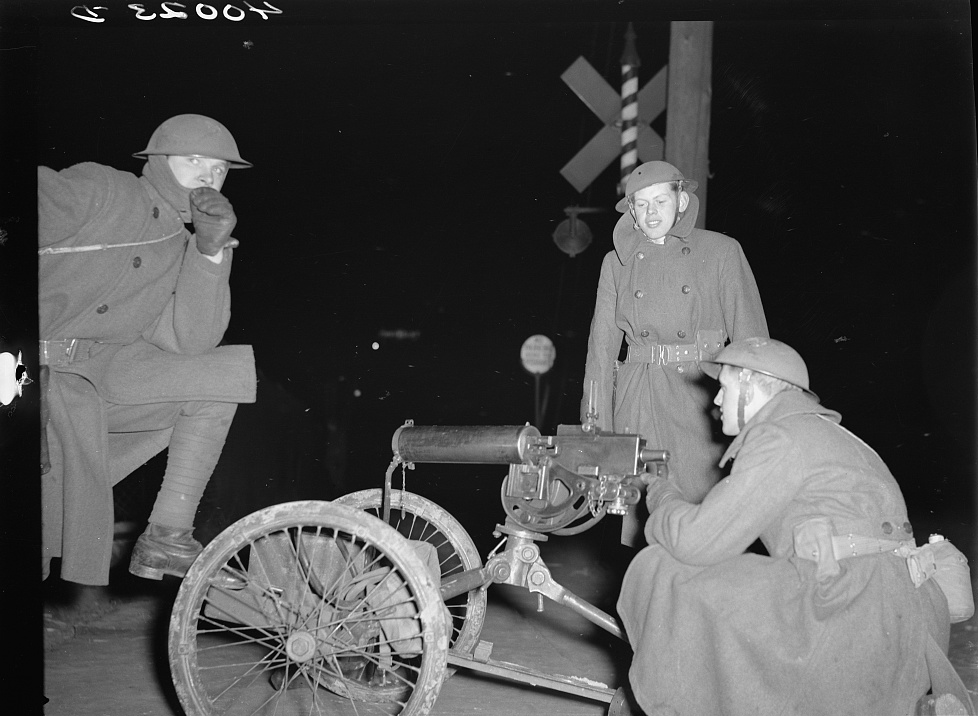
National Guardsmen with machine guns overlooking Chevrolet factories number nine and number four

The police, armed with guns and tear gas, attempted to enter the Fisher Body 2 plant on January 11, 1937. The strikers inside the plant pelted them with hinges, bottles, and bolts, led by Bob Travis and Roy Reuther. They were able to withstand several waves of attack, eventually ending the standoff. The strikers dubbed this "The Battle of Running Bulls", a mocking reference to the police ("bulls"). Fourteen strikers were injured by gunfire during the battle.

At the time, Vice President John Nance Garner supported federal intervention to break up the Flint strike, but this idea was rejected by President Franklin D. Roosevelt. The president urged GM to recognize a union so the plants could re-open.

GM obtained a second injunction against the strike on February 2, 1937. GM was granted the injunction by Judge Edward S. Black. Black owned over three thousand shares of GM and was disbarred from the case after the UAW found out about this. The union ignored the order, and spread the strike to Chevrolet Plant #4. To avoid tipping its hand, the union let it be known in the hours before the move that it intended to go after another plant in the complex, changing directions only at the last minute. GM, tipped off by an informant within the UAW, was ready and waiting for the union at the other plant and caught completely off guard at Plant #4. The strike ended after 44 days.

That development forced GM to bargain with the union. John L. Lewis, President of the United Mine Workers and founder and leader of the Congress of Industrial Organizations, spoke for the UAW in those negotiations; UAW President Homer Martin was sent on a speaking tour to keep him out of the way. GM's representatives refused to be in the same room as the UAW's, so Governor Frank Murphy acted as courier and intermediary between the two groups. Murphy sent in the Michigan National Guard, not to evict the strikers, but rather to protect them from the police and corporate strike-breakers. The two parties reached agreement on February 11, 1937, on a one-page agreement that recognized the UAW as the exclusive bargaining representative for GM's employees who were members of the union for the next six months.

== Conclusion ==
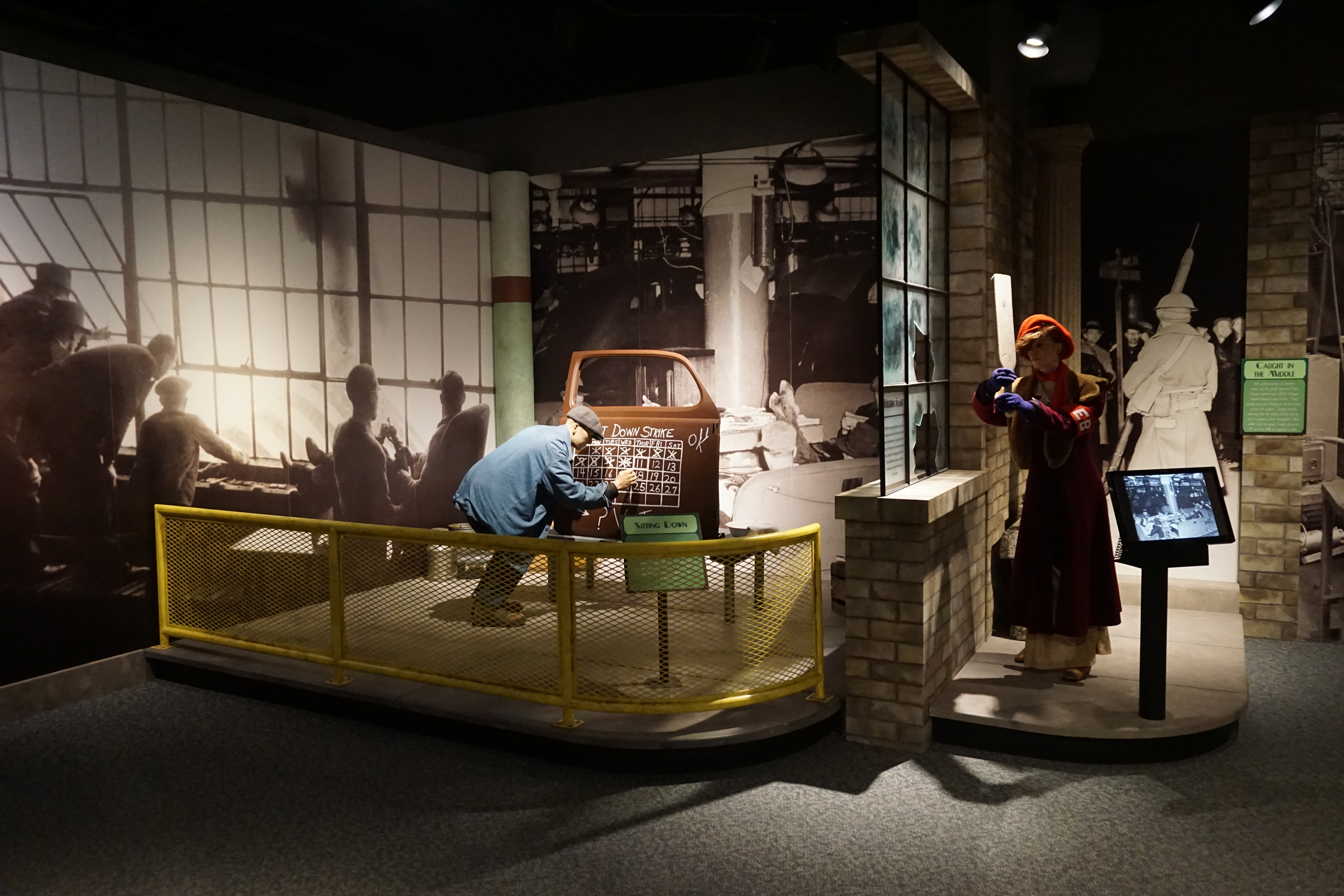
Flint sit-down strike exhibit at the Sloan Museum

The agreement that GM consented to was to rehire workers that were a part of the strike, allow workers to wear buttons and other symbols that represented unions, and granted 6 months of negotiations in the plants that participated in a strike to UAW-CIO.

As short as this agreement was, it gave the UAW instant legitimacy. The workers there also got a 5% increase in pay and were allowed to talk about the union during lunch. The UAW capitalized on that opportunity, signing up 100,000 GM employees and building the union's strength through grievance strikes at GM plants throughout the country. Several participants in the strike, including Charles I. Krause, went on to greater prominence within the union. Other notable participants in the sit-down strike were future D-Day hero and Greco-Roman wrestling champion Dean Rockwell, labor leader and future UAW president Walter Reuther, and the uncle of documentary filmmaker Michael Moore, whose debut feature Roger & Me contains a clip from the strike.

In the next year, UAW membership grew from 30,000 to 500,000 members. Employees of other car manufacturers such as Ford joined, as the entire industry was rapidly unionized. As later noted by the BBC, "the strike was heard 'round the world".

The sit-down strike became a principal weapon of mass organization in the labor industry. Labor workers could unionize regardless of race and education status, creating opportunities for membership agreements, payroll negotiation, and even government protection for workers. The strike gave the workers a newfound confidence to join unions and use their voice.

However, public support for sit-down strikes did not endure. For years, corporate media campaigns consistently excoriated these protests. People either came to agree with that messaging or grew tired of the consistent disruptions caused by the sit-down. In 1939, the United States Supreme Court held in NLRB v. Fansteel Metallurgical Corp. that the NLRB could not protect workers who engaged in sit-down strikes because sit-down strikes were illegal.

== See also ==
- With Babies and Banners: Story of the Women's Emergency Brigade, a 1979 documentary film
