= West Jefferson Avenue–Rouge River Bridge =

- U.S. National Register of Historic Places
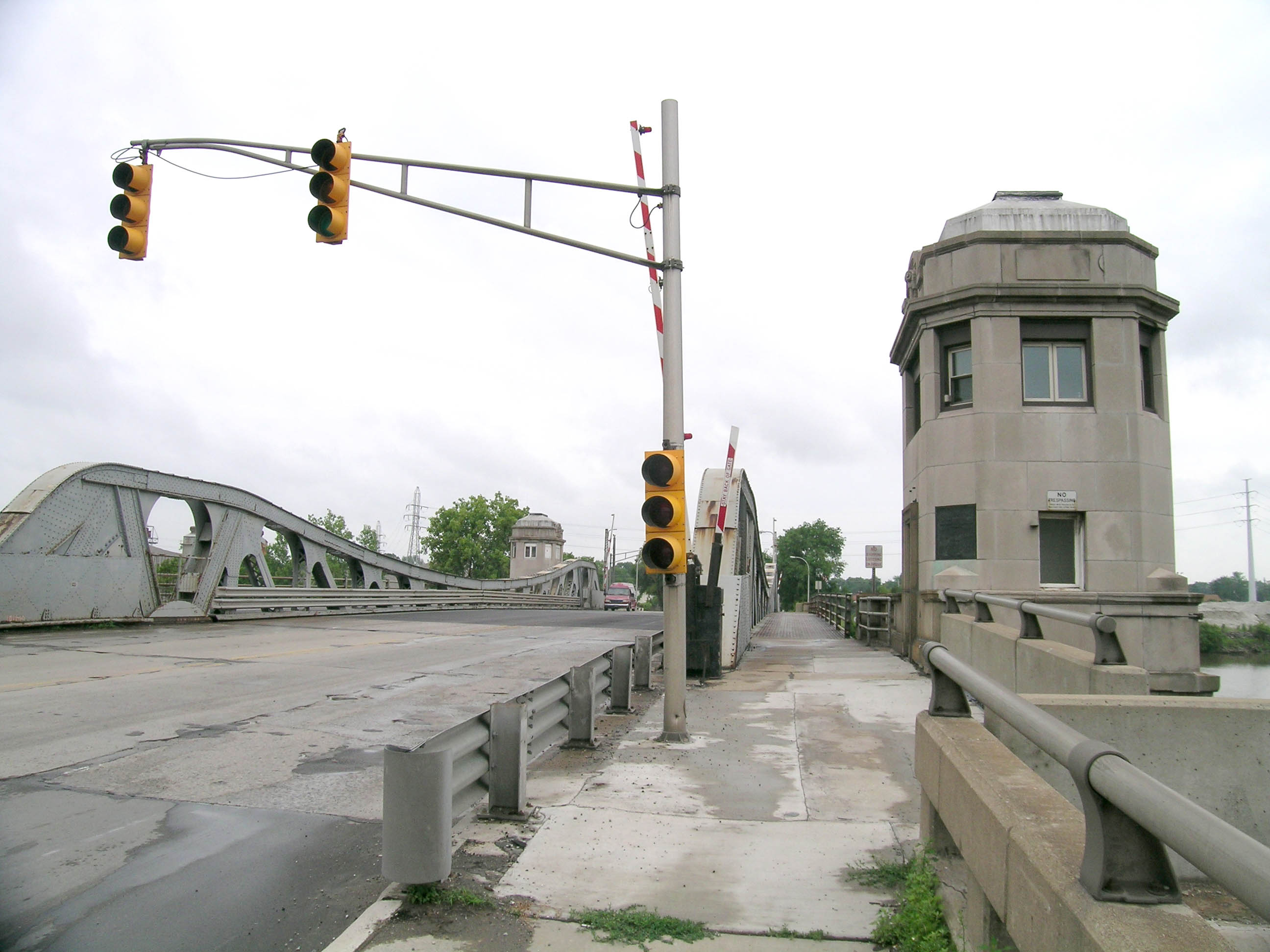
- Rouge River bridge looking west
- Interactive map
- Location: River Rouge, Michigan
- Coordinates: 42°16′50″N 83°7′44″W
- Built: 1922
- Architect: Stroebel Steel Construction Company; Valley Bridge and Iron Company
- MPS: Highway Bridges of Michigan MPS
- NRHP reference No.: 00000079
- Added to NRHP: February 10, 2000

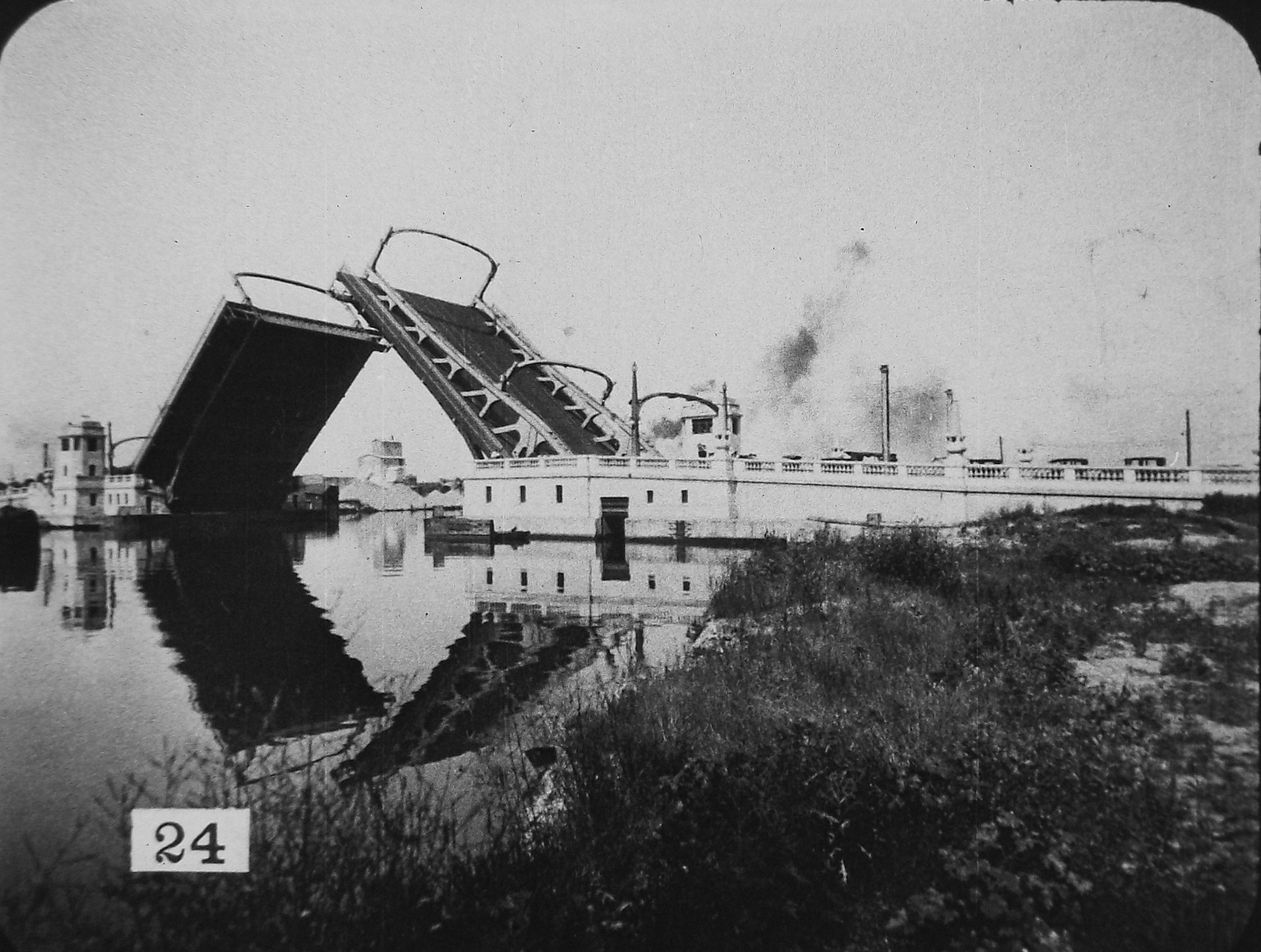
Rouge River Bridge in the filmstrip "Detroit" by S.V.E. Picturol, Series Important Cities of the U.S., about 1925

The West Jefferson Avenue–Rouge River Bridge is a historic double-leaf bascule bridge in Wayne County, Michigan, at the border of the cities of Detroit and River Rouge. The bridge carries Jefferson Avenue, a major thoroughfare in Southwest Detroit, over the River Rouge, an important inland route for lake freighters. The bridge was built in 1922, and was listed on the National Register of Historic Places in 2000.

== History ==
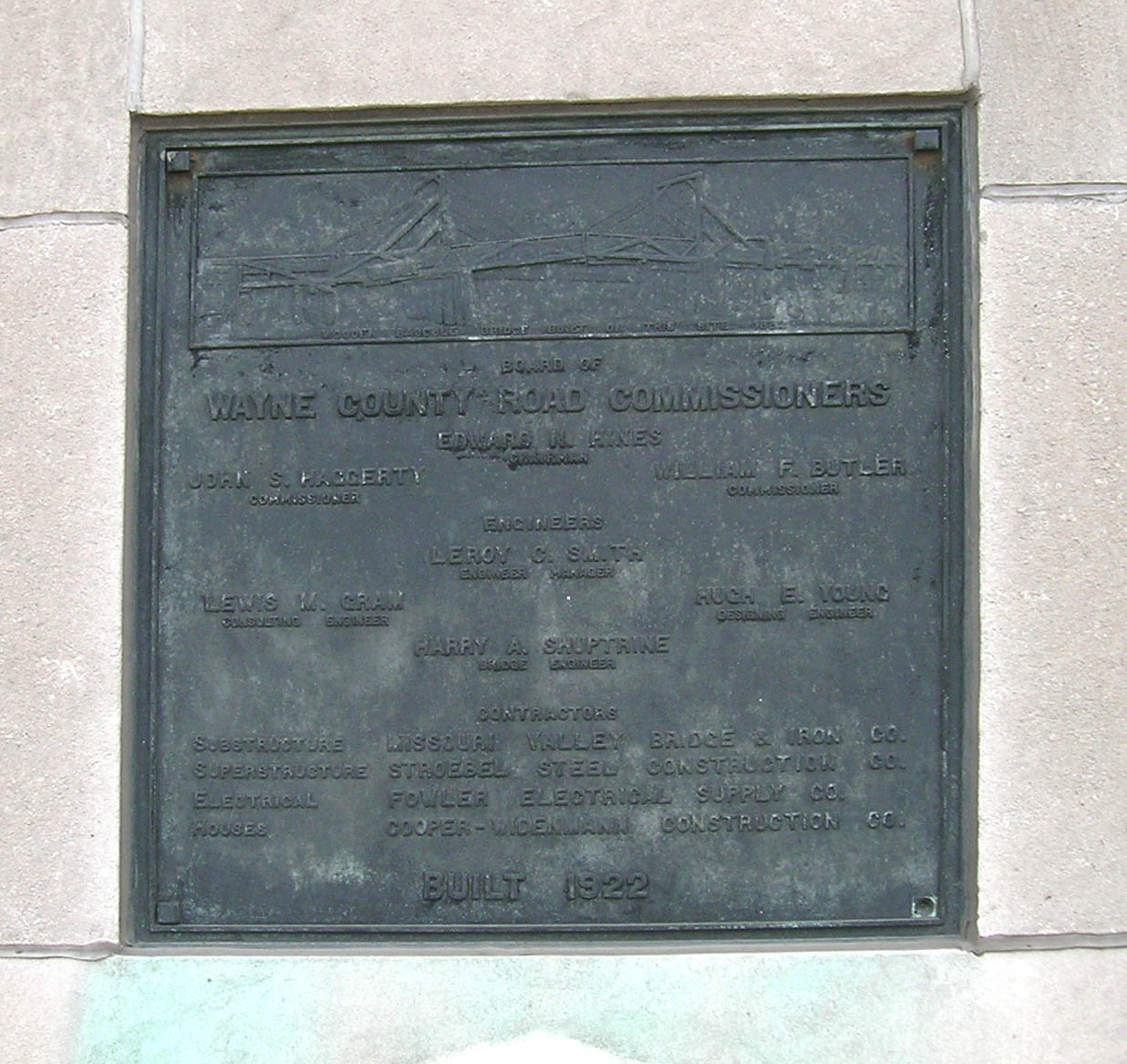
Plaque on the east bridge tower

Before the current bridges crossing the Rouge River at West Jefferson and Fort Streets were built, the two crossings were served by narrow swing bridges. By the late 1910s, these spans urgently needed replacing, in large part because they interfered with the Federal government's plans to dredge the Rouge River to provide freighter access to the Ford River Rouge Complex. Both the city of Detroit (who was responsible for maintaining the bridges) and Wayne County agreed that the county could better oversee the construction, but legal restrictions prohibited county involvement until state law was changed in 1919.

With the new legislation in place, plans were drawn up in 1920 for a "Chicago city type of single trunnion, double-leaf bascule bridge" for each bridge. This design, prototyped by the 1902 Cortland Street Drawbridge, is optimized for tight spaces, and features a hidden counterweight that descends into a pit when the bridge opens.

The cost for the pair of bridges was estimated at $2 million. A bond issue to fund construction was approved by Wayne County voters, and an alternate route onto which Jefferson Avenue traffic could be shunted was devised. Wayne County obtained an old truss, originally used by the Michigan Central Railroad upstream of Jefferson, and floated it downstream to a location 200 yards north of Jefferson. The old Jefferson Avenue bridge was closed and the detour opened on November 13, 1920.

Construction on the bridge commenced immediately. Each leaf was to be supported by four 12-foot-square concrete footings, sunk to the bedrock 70 feet (21 m) below the water line. The footings supported a concrete pit measuring 50 by 80 feet (24 m) which housed the counterweights and machinery. Wayne County contracted with the Missouri Valley Bridge and Iron Company of Leavenworth, Kansas, to build the substructure for $408,280; with the Strobel Steel Construction Company of Chicago to build the superstructure for $378,005; Cooper-Widenmann Construction Company of Detroit to build the operators' houses for $78,700; and Fowler Electrical Supply Company of Toledo, Ohio, to supply electrical equipment for $34,809. County crews graded and paved the approaches.

On August 21, 1922, the two bascule leaves were lowered simultaneously for the first time. The bridge was opened to traffic on October 17; at the time, work on the approaches was still ongoing, but operating machinery on the detour bridge failed, necessitating the bridge's removal to allow free passage of river traffic. The next year, the federal government completed its planned dredging of the Rouge River.

In the early 1980s, the county spent $2.2 million to repair portions of the West Jefferson Bridge (as well as doing similar work to the crossing at Dix Avenue). These repairs have somewhat altered the West Jefferson Bridge, but it retains its integrity as a significant example of early twentieth-century engineering. The bridge was listed on the National Register of Historic Places in 2000, as part of a Multiple Property Submission of historic highway bridges in the state of Michigan.

The West Jefferson Avenue bridge was hit by the lake freighter Herbert C. Jackson in the early morning of May 12, 2013, causing significant damage to the bridge. The bridge operator on duty was heavily intoxicated, and rapidly closed the bridge after opening it and signalling for the freighter to proceed. The Herbert C. Jackson, loaded with iron ore bound for the Rouge Steel plant, dropped its anchors and reversed its engines, but could not stop in time.

The bridge was damaged severely in the 2013 incident. The Herbert C. Jackson suffered only minor damage, and there were no injuries aboard the freighter or on shore. The bridge operator, a 17-year employee of the Wayne County Road Commission, was fired and ordered to pay a $1,000 fine, but was not otherwise criminally charged. The bridge was closed to road traffic for over three years while repairs were made, to the displeasure of city leaders in River Rouge, who criticized Wayne County officials for inaction. The bridge reopened on August 12, 2016, at a cost of over $20 million, the majority of which was covered by insurance.

== In popular culture ==
- The drawbridge is depicted in the 2005 video game, Midnight Club 3: Dub Edition.
- The drawbridge and its operator are referenced in the 1999 Insane Clown Posse song "Fuck The World".
