= STLD =

STLD may refer to:

- Sponsored top-level domain (sTLD)
- Steel Dynamics, stock symbol STLD
- Star Trek: Lower Decks
