= Lucchini RS =

- Type: Società per Azioni (Limited by Shares)
- Industry: Railway rolling stock, steel, forging, foundry
- Founded: 1856
- Founder: Gregorini
- Headquarters: Via Oberdan 6/A, Brescia, Italy
- Key people: Luigi Lucchini (Lucchini Group founder); Giuseppe Lucchini (Chairman); Augusto Mensi (CEO)
- Products: Railways products (wheels, axles, wheelsets), steel casting, forgings, tool steels, forge ingots
- Revenue: ▲€468 million (2021)
- Net income: ▲€24.8 million (2021)
- Number of employees: 2,049 (2021)
- Website: www.LucchiniRS.com

Lucchini RS S.p.A. (formerly Lucchini Sidermeccanica S.p.A. and where the acronym "RS" stands for "rolling stock") is an Italian company, fully owned by the Lucchini family through a financial holding called Sinpar S.p.A. and divided from Gruppo Lucchini, which was under Russian control of Alexei Mordashov and Severstal from 2005 till 2007. In 2008 the Lucchini family took back the control of Lucchini RS.

Lucchini RS specialises in steel products such as railways products, steel casting, forgings, tool steels and forge ingots.

The company headquarters is in Brescia, but the main plant is located in Lovere Bergamo on the west shore of Iseo Lake: the plant covers an area of 237,000 sqm including 147,000 sqm of factory buildings. Typical of this company is its ability to house on site all phases of production from the initial design to the finished products.

The Lucchini RS Group is made of:

- Lucchini RS
- Lucchini Industries
- Lucchini Mamé Forge
- Lucchini FA. RO.
- LUR (formerly known as Lucchini UK)
- Lucchini Sweden
- Lucchini Poland
- Zhibo Lucchini
- Lucchini CE (Austria)
- LBX (Belgium)
- Lucchini India
- Lucchini CN (Beijing, China)
- Lucchini South Africa
- Ahiyeni Rail
- Lucchini North America

== History ==
The Lovere production site, the current main plant of Lucchini RS Group, was founded in 1856 by Giovanni Andrea Gregorini who moved his business from Valcamonica. In 1907 the plant started the production of railway wheels, still today one of the distinctive products of the company, being the only Italian manufacturer of forged railway wheels and among the few in the world.

In 1930 the company was nationalized and remained under state control for many years, under various names including ILVA, Italsider, Terni and Lovere Sidermeccanica.

In 1990, within the general framework of the privatization program of the Italian State-owned steel industry, the Lovere plant was sold to the Lucchini Group of Mr. Luigi Lucchini. The company was then called "Lucchini Sidermeccanica" and started a program of modernization and internationalization – in 2000 the companies Lucchini UK and Lucchini Sweden were acquired from AD Tranz, in 2002 Lucchini Poland was founded – remaining within the Lucchini Group until 2007. In this year the Lucchini family, through its financial holding company Sinpar S.p.A., acquired direct and complete control of Lucchini Sidermeccanica.

The same year, the company established a joint venture called Zhibo Lucchini Railway Equipment Ltd with China's Zhibo Transport Equipment to build the world's largest maintenance plant for wheelsets to equip Chinese high-speed trains. Chinese high-speed rail is by far the largest network in the world by line length and number of trains in service. Also in 2007, the company launched an investment of approximately 100 million Euros for the complete replacement of its railway wheel forging line with a new fully automated line. The line started production in 2010.

In 2008 the company changed its name, assuming its current name Lucchini RS S.p.A..

On 27 June 2014, Lucchini RS acquired from the Tribunal of Liege the bankrupt Valdunes company to manufacture railway products. The name of the new company is LBX SA.

On 3 September 2014 Lucchini RS announced that it signed a preliminary agreement to acquire, by the end of 2014, 49% shareholding of Mamé Group, an important manufacturer of forged steel components based in Cividate Camuno Brescia. Mamé Group was eventually completely acquired by Lucchini RS and renamed Lucchini Mamé Forge.

On 2 February 2015 Lucchini RS and Unipart Rail created a new joint venture called LUR or Lucchini Unipart Rail Ltd. The new business has an annual turnover of around £60m (about €75m) and employs over 300 people on two production sites, Manchester and Doncaster. Lucchini RS holds 60% of LUR.

On 1 March 2017 Lucchini RS acquired Euras, a branch of Acciai Brianza, giving life to Lucchini Tool Steel, active in the processing and marketing of tool steel. The new acquisition was part of the industrial strategy of Lucchini RS for consolidating and strengthening the "Forgings and Castings Division" launched after the acquisition of Lucchini Mame Forge.

On 1 September 2018, a new company Lucchini Industries Srl was carved out of Lucchini RS, grouping all the production assets of the Lovere plant.

In September 2021, Lucchini RS announced and agreement with the shareholders of FA.RO Acciai to merge FA.RO with Lucchini Tool Steel, thus creating Lucchini FA.RO. s.r.l., one of the most important European service centers for the sale of tool steel, for the production of molds for plastic, die-casting, extrusion and hot stamping.

== See also ==
- List of Italian companies
