= Ford Dearborn Assembly Plant =

Former Ford automotive assembly plant

Dearborn Assembly Plant
- Built: 1918
- Operated: 1918–2004
- Location: 3001 Miller Road; Dearborn, Michigan, United States
- Coordinates
- Industry: Automotive
- Products: Ford Mustang
- Employees: 2,175 (2004)
- Architect: Albert Kahn
- Area: 47 acres (19 ha)
- Volume: 3,400,000 square feet (320,000 m^{2})
- Owner: Ford Motor Company
- Defunct: May 10, 2004

Dearborn Assembly Plant (DAP) was an automobile manufacturing plant in Dearborn, Michigan owned by Ford Motor Company. The plant was part of the Ford River Rouge complex.

== History ==
=== 1918–1964 ===
The plant was opened in 1918 as Building B to produce Eagle anti-submarine patrol boats for the U.S. Navy, launching its first vessel on July 11th of that year. On February 23, 1921, the Fordson tractor, which was previously produced at a separate Dearborn plant since 1917, was transferred to the plant, continuing production until 1928. Following the broader Rouge River industrial expansion, the plant was renamed Dearborn Assembly and shifted to car assembly, beginning with the Model A in October 1927 as final assembly shifted from Highland Park.

On May 26, 1937, members of the United Auto Workers (UAW) planned to hand out leaflets, which resulted in an attack by Ford near the plant; it is known as the Battle of the Overpass. On June 20, 1941, Ford (which owns the plant) signed its first contract with the United Auto Workers (UAW), becoming the last of the Detroit Big Three automakers to unionize after General Motors and Chrysler.

The plant halted civilian automobile production on February 10, 1942 under federal wartime orders to shift toward military production (like Jeeps) for the US military during World War II. It resumed civilian production on July 3, 1945, several days before the war was ended, when Henry Ford II drove the first post-war civilian Ford model off the assembly line.

=== 1964–2001: Mustang production ===
On March 9, 1964, the plant began production of the Ford Mustang, ahead of the official public launch on April 17th of that year. Before full production, Ford built roughly 150 to 200 pre-production models starting in January of the same year. More than 6.7 million Mustangs were produced at DAP from 1964 to 2004.

By September 1982, the plant, which then employed about 3,000 workers, faced efficiency reviews and rumors of a potential shutdown, though Ford denied immediate closure plans. The next year, in September 1983, Ford announced it will shut down the aging Rouge Steel mill near the plant, but the closure was later reversed. In December 1989, Ford scheduled temporary plant idlings that affected roughly 2,100 workers at the Dearborn Assembly Plant.

In February 1999, a gas explosion at the nearby Rouge powerhouse killed six workers and injured two dozen others, leading to the idling of the original power plant and a replacement facility built across Miller Road. In 2000, Ford opened a new Dearborn Paint Plant nearby to reduce fallout contamination from the body shop and improve finishes on Mustang bodies. In October 2001, William Clay Ford Jr. succeeded Jacques Nasser as head of Ford Motor Company, launching a "back-to-basics" turnaround and restructuring plan.

=== 2001–2004: Final years and closure ===
On December 17, 2001, Ford announced it will indefinitely cut production and lay off workers at several plants, including the Dearborn Assembly Plant, following a difficult year marked by the Firestone tire crisis and post-9/11 economic slowdown. It was later followed on January 11, 2002, when Ford announced it will close the nearby Vulcan Forge as part of a restructuring plan that included 12,000 manufacturing job cuts. In February 2003, Ford announced it would move production of the redesigned 2005 Mustang from the Dearborn Assembly Plant to the AutoAlliance International plant in Flat Rock, Michigan, operated with Mazda.

On May 10, 2004, Ford shut down the assembly plant after operating it for almost 86 years, with many employees transferred to the new Dearborn Truck Plant located near the old plant. The final vehicle, a red 2004 Mustang GT convertible, was driven off the assembly line by Fred Galicki, a 21-year old employee. Demolition of the building was completed in 2008.

== Products ==
- Eagle-class patrol craft (1918–1919)
- Fordson tractor (1921–1928)
- Ford Model T (1920s; parts)
- Ford Model A (1927–1932)
- Ford Model B (1932–1934)
- Ford Model 48 (1935–1936)
- 1937 Ford (1937–1940)
- 1941 Ford (1941–1942, 1946–1949)
- Ford F-Series (1948–1980?)
- 1949 Ford (1949–1951)
- 1952 Ford (1952–1954)
- Ford Fairlane (1955–1961)
- Ford Thunderbird (1955–1957)
- Ford Mustang (1964–2004)
- Mercury Capri (1979–1986)
- Mercury Cougar (1966–1973)

== See also ==
- Ford River Rouge complex
- Dearborn Truck Plant
