= Dearborn Truck Plant =

Ford Motor Company assembly plant

- Built: 2000–2004
- Operated: 2004–present
- Location: 3001 Miller Road; Dearborn, Michigan, United States
- Coordinates
- Industry: Automotive
- Products: Ford F-Series
- Employees: 4,400
- Architect: William McDonough + Partners
- Area: 1,100 acres (450 ha)
- Volume: 2,600,000 square feet (240,000 m^{2})
- Owner: Ford Motor Company

Dearborn Truck Plant is an automobile manufacturing plant in Dearborn, Michigan owned by Ford Motor Company. The plant is part of the Ford River Rouge complex.

Built as Ford's first new North American assembly plant since 1987, the Dearborn Truck Plant was opened in 2004 with standalone body, paint, and final assembly buildings connected by enclosed conveyors.

== History ==
In November 2002, Ford announced that its new under-construction truck plant would begin building the Ford F-150 pickup truck in 2004. Construction on the revitalized truck plant was finished in June 2003.

The plant was opened in May 2004, the same month when Ford closed its nearby Dearborn Assembly Plant.

In 2022, the nearby Rouge Electric Vehicle Center began producing the Ford F-150 Lightning, which was discontinued in 2025.

In October 2025, Ford announced it will add a new third crew of about 1,200 employees at the Dearborn Truck Plant to target more than 45,000 additional gas and hybrid F-150 trucks in 2026.

== Products ==
=== Current ===
- Ford F-Series (2004–present)

=== Former ===
- Ford F-150 Lightning (2022–2025; produced at a separate plant)

== See also ==
- Ford River Rouge complex
- Ford Dearborn Assembly Plant
