= River Rouge School District =

Michigan public school district

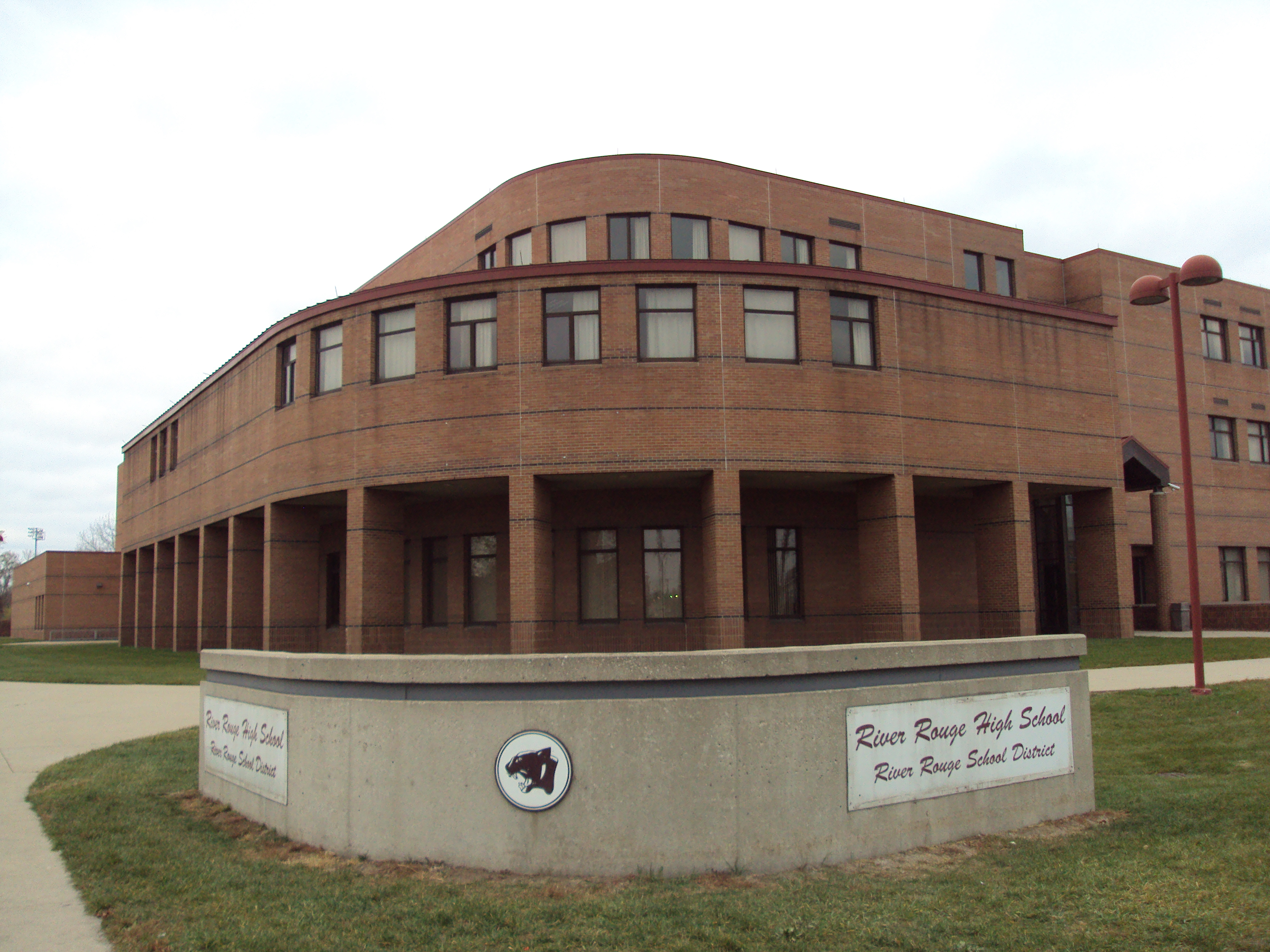
- River Rouge High School
- 1460 W. Coolidge Highway River Rouge, Wayne, Michigan

District information
- Type: Public
- Grades: Pre-Kindergarten-12
- Superintendent: Dr. Derrick R. Coleman
- Schools: 5
- Budget: $45,001,000 2022-2023 expenditures
- NCES District ID: 2629760

Students and staff
- Students: 3,084 (2024–2025)
- Teachers: 110.26 (on an FTE basis) (2024–2025)
- Staff: 349.47 FTE (2024–2025)
- Student–teacher ratio: 27.97 (2024-2025)

Other information
- Website: riverrougeschools.org

River Rouge School District is a public school district in the Metro Detroit area. The district serves the entire city of River Rouge just south of the city of the Detroit and also includes a very small portion of the northern city limits of Ecorse to the south. The district operates four regular schools and one online school, its second-largest by enrollment as of the 2023-2024 school year.

== History ==
The River Rouge School District was mentioned in the newspaper as early as 1904. In June of 1907, five students graduated from the high school, a number that expanded to 37 in 1925. A new high school, at 1411 Coolidge, was dedicated in 1922. A bond issue passed in 1993 to build the present high school.

== Schools ==
Schools in River Rogue School District
| School | Grades | Address |
|---|---|---|
| Ann Visger Preparatory Academy | PreK–5 | 11121 Jefferson Avenue |
| River Rouge STEM Academy | PreK–8 | 163 Burke Street |
| Clarence B. Sabbath Middle School | 6–8 | 340 Frazier Street |
| River Rouge High School | 9–12 | 1460 W. Coolidge Highway |

== Images ==
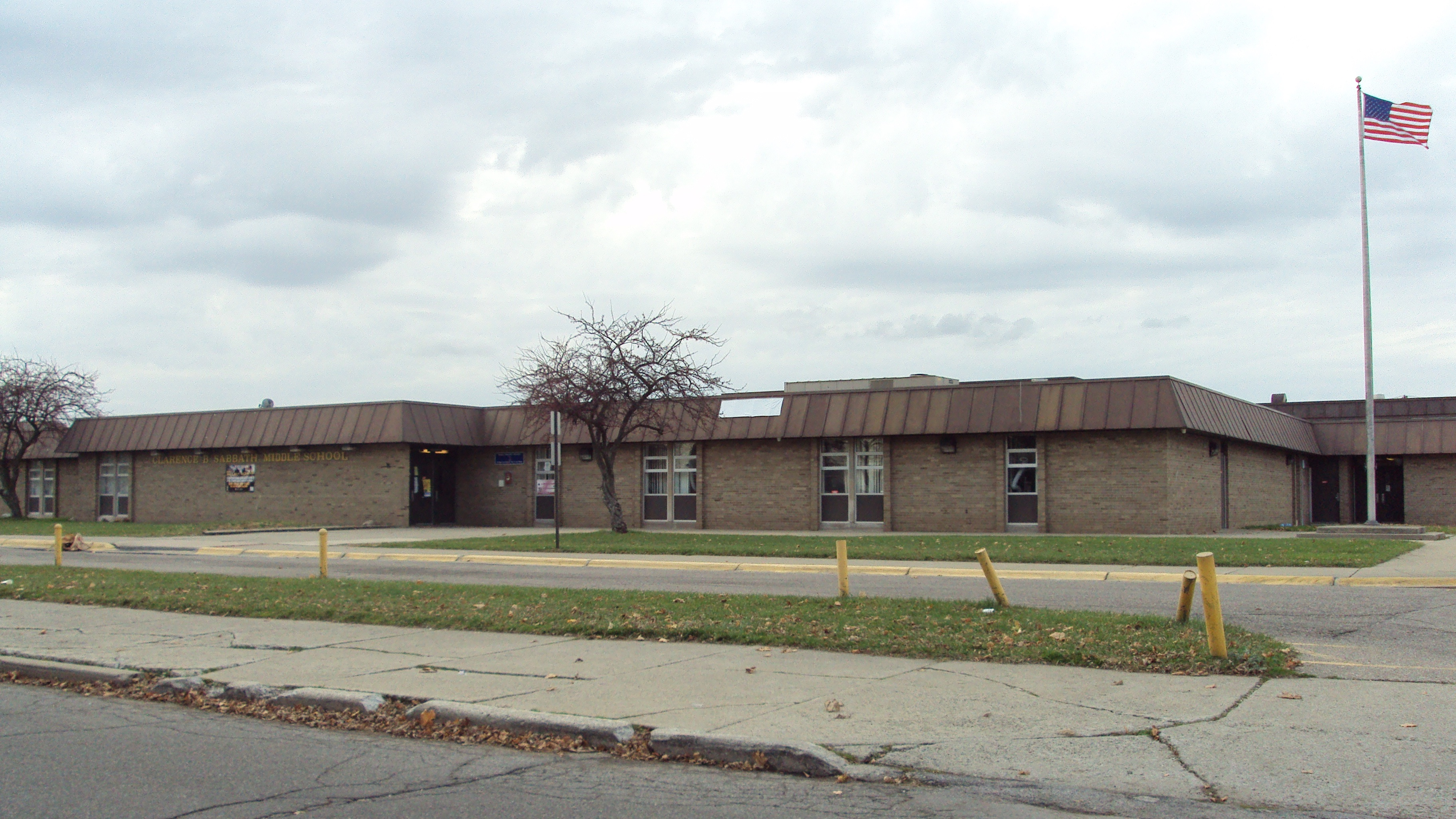
Sabbath Middle School

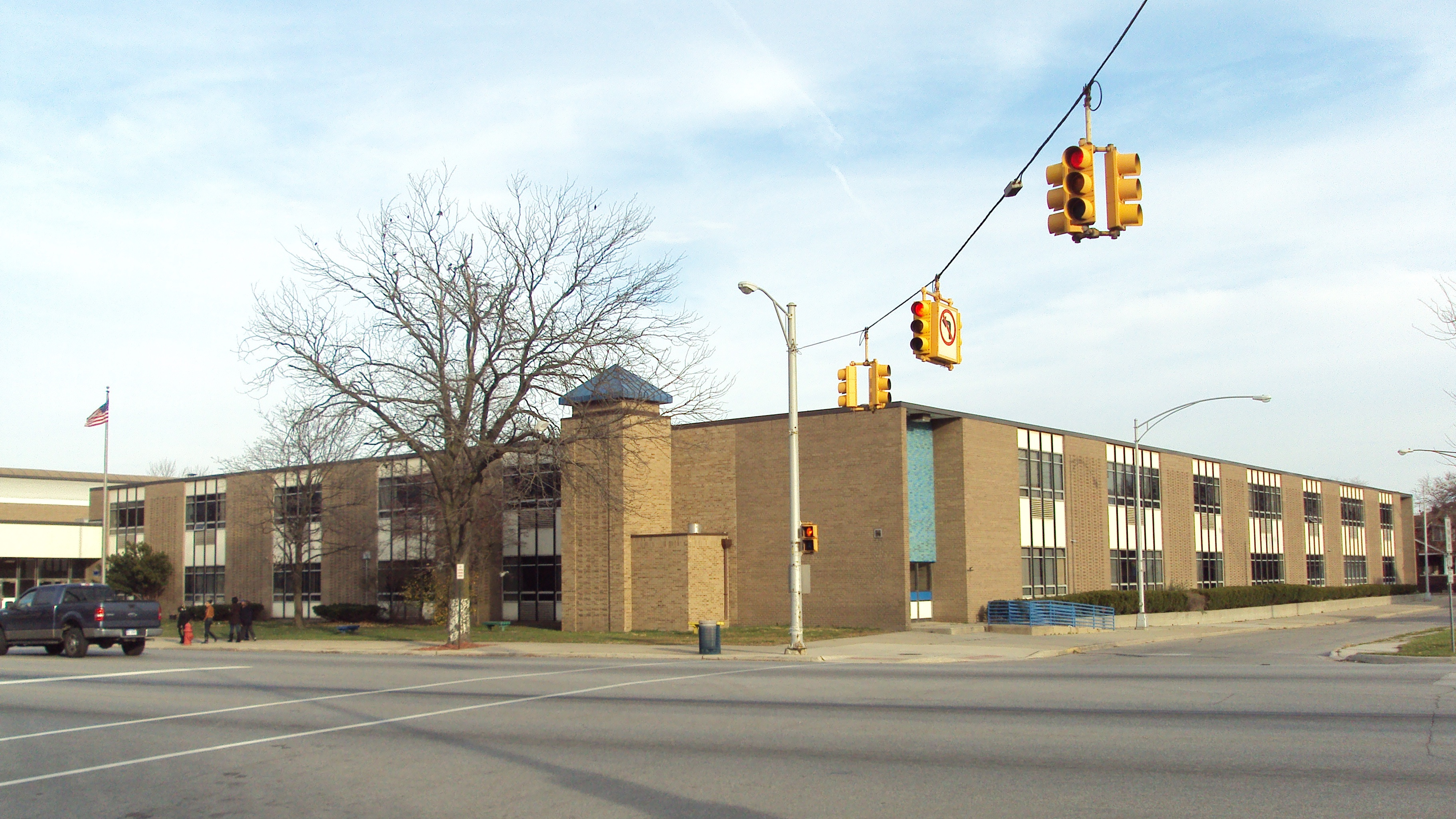
Visger Elementary School
