= Gruppo Lucchini =

Defunct Italian steel group

- Type: S.p.A.
- Industry: Steel
- Founded: 1946
- Founder: Luigi Lucchini
- Fate: Extraordinary administration (2013); Piombino assets sold in 2015
- Headquarters: Brescia, Italy
- Products: Hot-rolled long products Semi-finished products Cold-processed bars Railway products
- Revenue: €1.89 billion (2010)
- Operating income: −€108 million (2010)
- Net income: −€648 million (2010)
- Number of employees: 6,992 (2007)
- Parent: Severstal (2005–2010)

Gruppo Lucchini was an Italian steel group based in Brescia. It was the third-largest Italian steel group after Gruppo Riva and Techint, with a 2005 production of 3.5 million tonnes. It specialised in high-quality long and special carbon steel products.

== History ==
In December 1992 the group acquired the Piombino steelworks from Ilva.

In 2005 the Russian steel and mining company Severstal became the majority shareholder (approximately 60%) of Lucchini, the remainder being owned by the Lucchini family (30%) and other minor shareholders.

In 2007, the Lucchini family bought back Lucchini RS, the part of the group active in the railway rolling stock business. The two companies are therefore totally independent.

In 2010, Severstal acquired the remaining shares held by the Lucchini family.

== Insolvency and sale of assets ==
In December 2012 the group applied for extraordinary administration, and Piero Nardi was appointed commissioner. On 7 January 2013 the Court of Livorno declared the company insolvent under the Marzano law. The Piombino blast furnace was shut down on 24 April 2014.

In November 2014 the Algerian group Cevital won the tender for the Piombino assets, and in July 2015 the sale was completed with the creation of Aferpi. In May 2018 an agreement was signed to sell Aferpi to JSW.

== See also ==
- List of steel producers
