= River Rouge, Michigan =

River Rouge, Michigan Rivière Rouge (French)
- City
- City of River Rouge
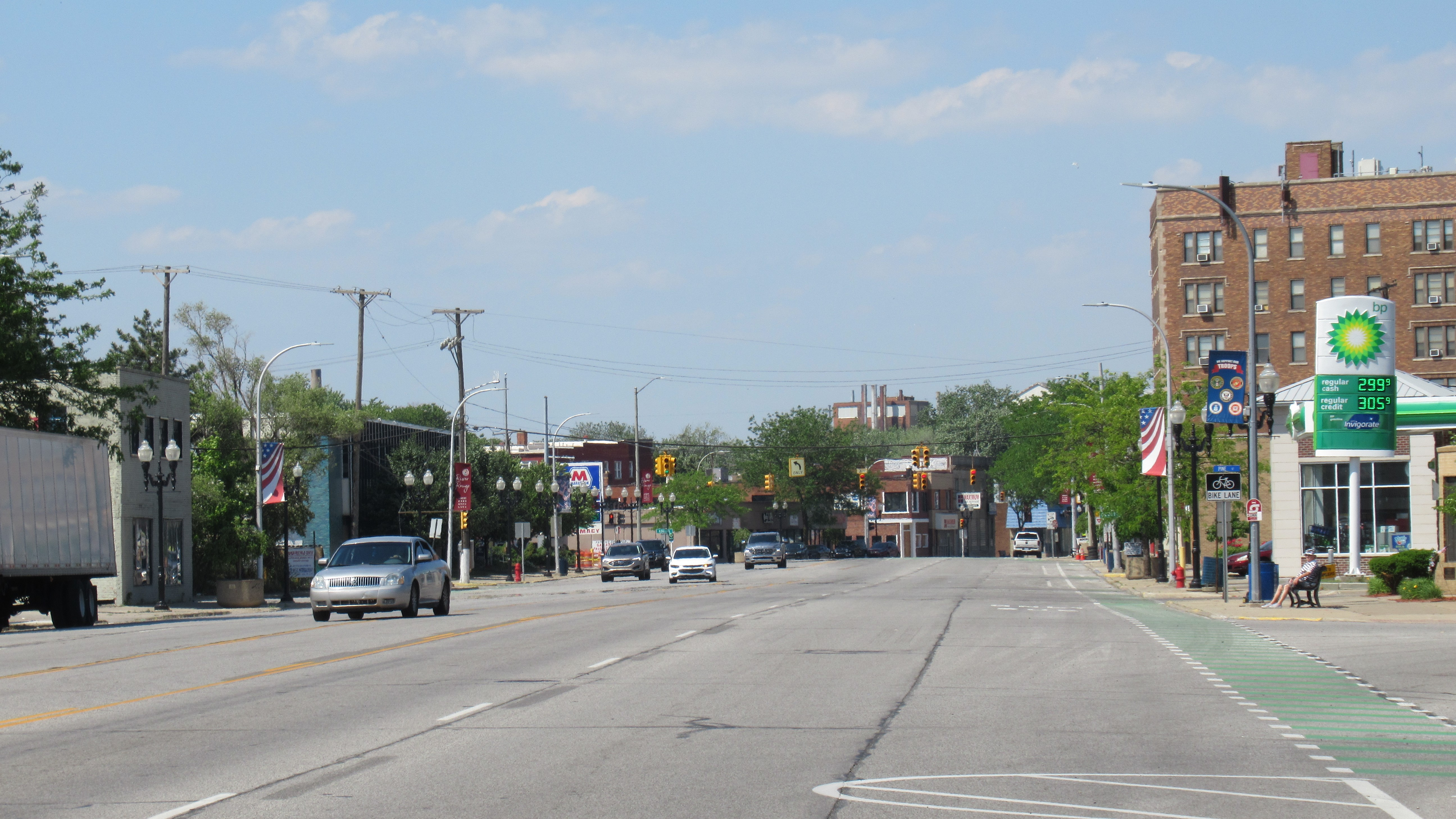
- Looking north along Jefferson Avenue

- Seal

- Location within Wayne County

- Location within the state of Michigan Location within the United States
- Coordinates: 42°16′17″N 83°08′05″W
- Country: United States
- State: Michigan
- County: Wayne
- Settled: 1808
- Incorporated: 1899 (village); 1922 (city)

Government
  - Type: Mayor–council
  - Mayor: William Campbell
  - Clerk: Patricia Johnson

Area
  - City: 3.25 sq mi (8.41 km^{2})
  - Land: 2.65 sq mi (6.87 km^{2})
  - Water: 0.59 sq mi (1.54 km^{2})
- Elevation: 584 ft (178 m)

Population (2020)
  - City: 7,224
  - Density: 2,721.7/sq mi (1,050.85/km^{2})
  - Metro: 4,285,832 (Metro Detroit)
- Time zone: UTC-5 (EST)
  - Summer (DST): UTC-4 (EDT)
- ZIP code(s): 48209 (Detroit) (Note: The unpopulated Zug Island uses the Detroit 48209 ZIP Code, while the rest of River Rouge uses the 48218 ZIP Code.); 48218
- Area code: 313
- FIPS code: 26-68760
- GNIS feature ID: 635965
- Website: cityofriverrouge.net

River Rouge (/rɪˈvɜːr ruːʒ/, French: Rivière Rouge, lit. 'red river') is a city in Wayne County in the U.S. state of Michigan. An inner-ring, Downriver suburb of Detroit, River Rouge is located roughly 7 miles (11.3 km) southwest of downtown Detroit. As of the 2020 census, the city had a population of 7,224.

The city is named after the River Rouge, which flows along the city's northern border and into the Detroit River. The city includes the heavily industrialized Zug Island and also has its own school district, River Rouge School District.

== History ==
The small settlement incorporated as a village in 1899 within Ecorse Township. In 1922 as the city of Detroit expressed interest in annexing land in the township, the Village of River Rouge incorporated as a city on April 3 to avoid being annexed. A month later Detroit completed annexation of land in the township immediately to the west of River Rouge.

One of the most important historical associations with River Rouge is its relationship to a Great Lakes freighter, the SS Edmund Fitzgerald, which sank in 1975 in a fierce storm in Lake Superior, with the loss of all 29 crew. The ship was constructed in 1958 at the Great Lakes Engineering Works in River Rouge and was the largest ship on the lakes at the time.

The city had its peak of population in 1950, when industry was the mainstay of the local economy. Restructuring of heavy industry and movement of jobs offshore have taken a toll of the city; the loss of jobs resulted in loss of population. In 2020 the population is 35% of what it was in 1950. Many workers who had the flexibility to seek jobs in other areas moved away. Outward migration has resulted in a shift in the racial demographics of the city.

== Geography ==
According to the United States Census Bureau, the city has a total area of 3.24 square miles (8.39 km^{2}), of which 2.65 square miles (6.86 km^{2}) is land and 0.59 square miles (1.53 km^{2}) is water.

Of the city's land area, 0.93 square miles (2.41 km^{2}) consists of the unpopulated Zug Island. The River Rouge forms the northern boundary with the city of Detroit, and the Detroit River forms the eastern boundary of the city. The Mariners Memorial Light is an active lighthouse located within the city along the Detroit River. Built in 2004, it is located within Belanger Park and is the newest constructed lighthouse in the state of Michigan.

River Rouge contains its own post office located at 10455 West Jefferson Avenue. The post office uses the 48218 ZIP Code, which covers most of River Rouge and a small section of the city of Ecorse to the south. Zug Island uses the Detroit 48209 ZIP Code.

== Demographics ==
Historical population
Census	Pop.	Note	%±
1900	1,748		—
1910	4,163		138.2%
1920	9,822		135.9%
1930	17,314		76.3%
1940	17,008		−1.8%
1950	20,549		20.8%
1960	18,147		−11.7%
1970	15,947		−12.1%
1980	12,912		−19.0%
1990	11,314		−12.4%
2000	9,917		−12.3%
2010	7,903		−20.3%
2020	7,224		−8.6%
U.S. Decennial Census; 2010-2020

=== Racial and ethnic composition ===
River Rouge city, Michigan – Racial and ethnic composition Note: the US Census treats Hispanic/Latino as an ethnic category. This table excludes Latinos from the racial categories and assigns them to a separate category. Hispanics/Latinos may be of any race.
Race / Ethnicity (NH = Non-Hispanic)	Pop 2000	Pop 2010	Pop 2020	% 2000	% 2010	% 2020
White alone (NH)	4,951	2,751	1,999	49.92%	34.81%	27.67%
Black or African American alone (NH)	4,144	3,933	3,506	41.79%	49.77%	48.53%
Native American or Alaska Native alone (NH)	62	38	29	0.63%	0.48%	0.40%
Asian alone (NH)	15	17	11	0.15%	0.22%	0.15%
Native Hawaiian or Pacific Islander alone (NH)	3	2	0	0.03%	0.03%	0.00%
Other race alone (NH)	27	8	40	0.27%	0.10%	0.55%
Mixed race or Multiracial (NH)	223	270	385	2.25%	3.42%	5.33%
Hispanic or Latino (any race)	492	884	1,254	4.96%	11.19%	17.36%
Total	9,917	7,903	7,224	100.00%	100.00%	100.00%

=== 2020 census ===
As of the 2020 census, River Rouge had a population of 7,224. The median age was 34.1 years. 28.7% of residents were under the age of 18 and 12.0% of residents were 65 years of age or older. For every 100 females there were 92.7 males, and for every 100 females age 18 and over there were 88.5 males age 18 and over.

100.0% of residents lived in urban areas, while 0.0% lived in rural areas.

There were 2,701 households in River Rouge, of which 34.2% had children under the age of 18 living in them. Of all households, 22.8% were married-couple households, 26.7% were households with a male householder and no spouse or partner present, and 42.0% were households with a female householder and no spouse or partner present. About 32.3% of all households were made up of individuals and 11.0% had someone living alone who was 65 years of age or older.

There were 3,282 housing units, of which 17.7% were vacant. The homeowner vacancy rate was 4.9% and the rental vacancy rate was 14.3%.

=== 2010 census ===
As of the census of 2010, there were 7,903 people, 2,897 households, and 1,885 families living in the city. The population density was 2,982.3 inhabitants per square mile (1,151.5/km^{2}). There were 3,731 housing units at an average density of 1,407.9 per square mile (543.6/km^{2}). The racial makeup of the city was 39.4% White, 50.5% African American, 0.6% Native American, 0.2% Asian, 0.1% Pacific Islander, 4.2% from other races, and 5.0% from two or more races. Hispanic or Latino of any race were 11.2% of the population.

There were 2,897 households, of which 37.7% had children under the age of 18 living with them, 25.1% were married couples living together, 32.3% had a female householder with no husband present, 7.6% had a male householder with no wife present, and 34.9% were non-families. 29.5% of all households were made up of individuals, and 10.2% had someone living alone who was 65 years of age or older. The average household size was 2.73 and the average family size was 3.37.

The median age in the city was 33 years. 29.2% of residents were under the age of 18; 10.6% were between the ages of 18 and 24; 24.4% were from 25 to 44; 24.7% were from 45 to 64; and 11.2% were 65 years of age or older. The gender makeup of the city was 47.0% male and 53.0% female.

=== 2000 census ===
As of the census of 2000, there were 9,917 people, 3,640 households, and 2,504 families living in the city. The population density was 3,713.9 inhabitants per square mile (1,433.9/km^{2}). There were 4,080 housing units at an average density of 1,528.0 per square mile (590.0/km^{2}). The racial makeup of the city was 52.58% White, 42.01% African American, 0.78% Native American, 0.16% Asian, 0.04% Pacific Islander, 1.63% from other races, and 2.80% from two or more races. Hispanic or Latino of any race were 4.96% of the population.

There were 3,640 households, out of which 36.0% had children under the age of 18 living with them, 31.4% were married couples living together, 30.4% had a female householder with no husband present, and 31.2% were non-families. 26.3% of all households were made up of individuals, and 8.9% had someone living alone who was 65 years of age or older. The average household size was 2.72 and the average family size was 3.25.

In the city, the population was spread out, with 31.2% under the age of 18, 10.2% from 18 to 24, 29.2% from 25 to 44, 18.8% from 45 to 64, and 10.6% who were 65 years of age or older. The median age was 31 years. For every 100 females, there were 89.4 males. For every 100 females age 18 and over, there were 84.1 males.

The median income for a household in the city was $29,214, and the median income for a family was $33,875. Males had a median income of $35,613 versus $24,391 for females. The per capita income for the city was $13,728. About 19.1% of families and 22.0% of the population were below the poverty line, including 30.6% of those under age 18 and 10.5% of those age 65 or over.

== Education ==
River Rouge School District serves River Rouge and also a small northern portion of the city of Ecorse. Schools within the district include River Rouge STEM Academy, Ann Visger Elementary School, Clarence B. Sabbath Elementary/Middle School, and River Rouge High School.

== Images ==
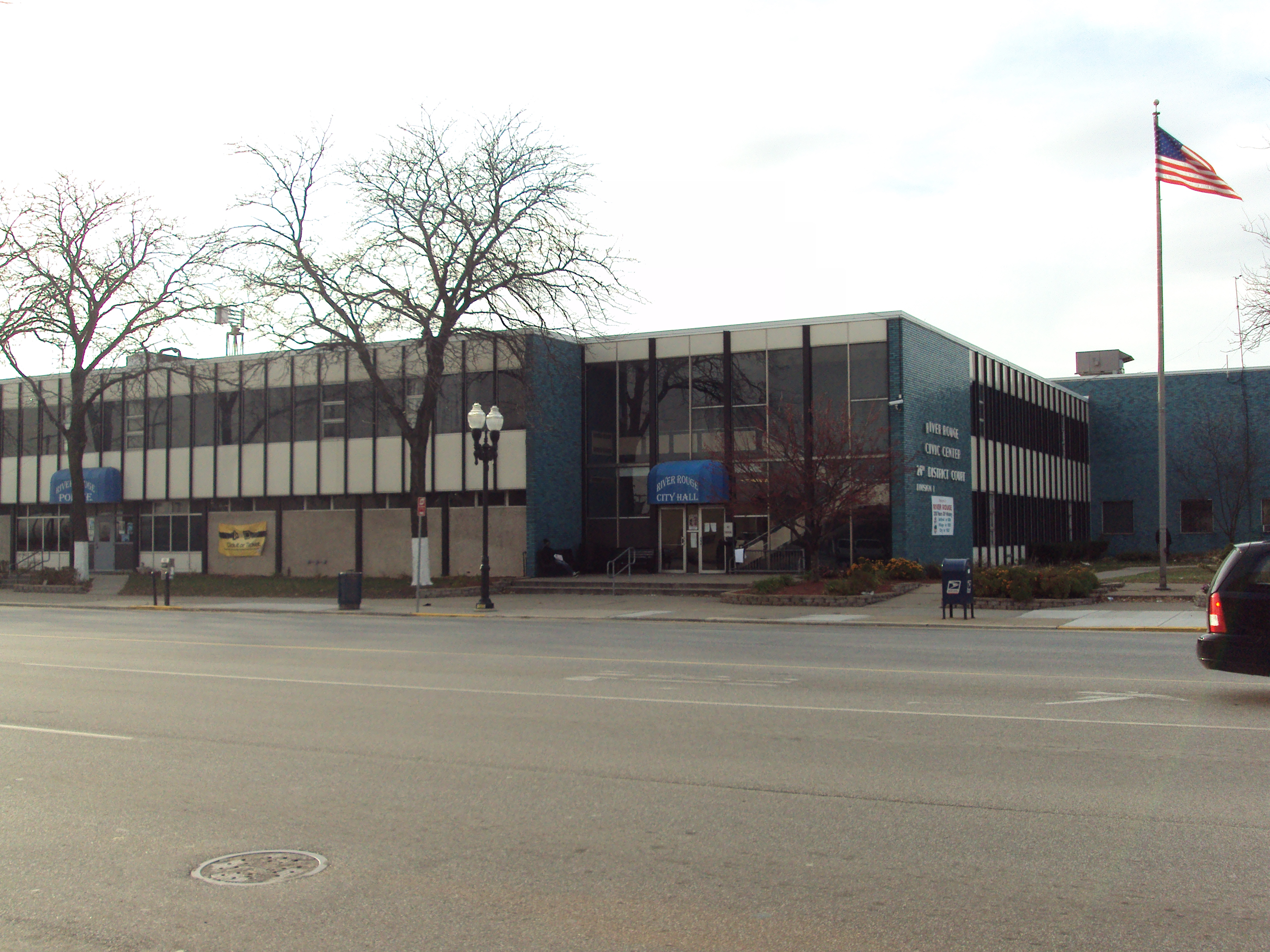
River Rouge Civic Center

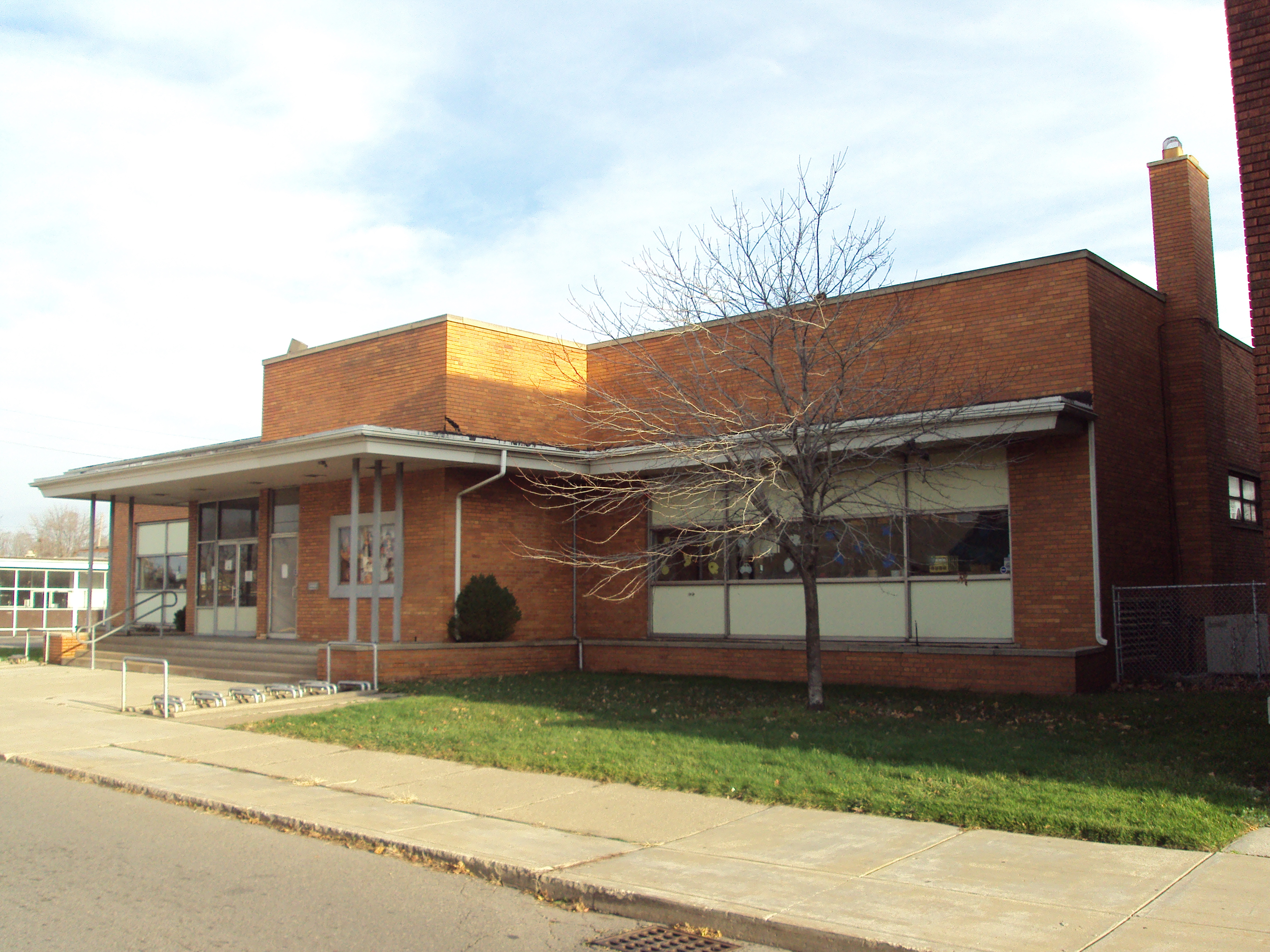
River Rouge Public Library

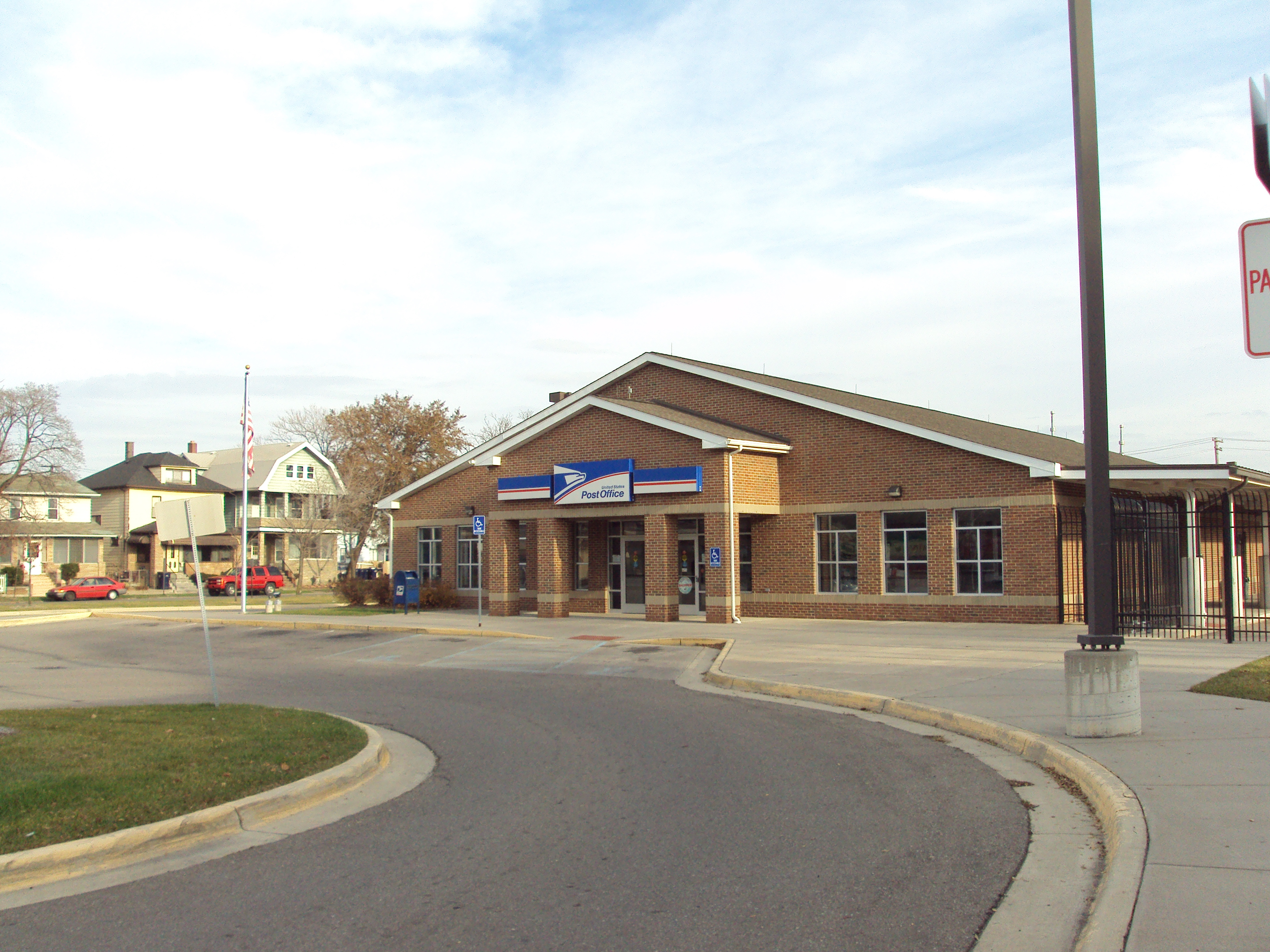
U.S. Post Office in River Rouge

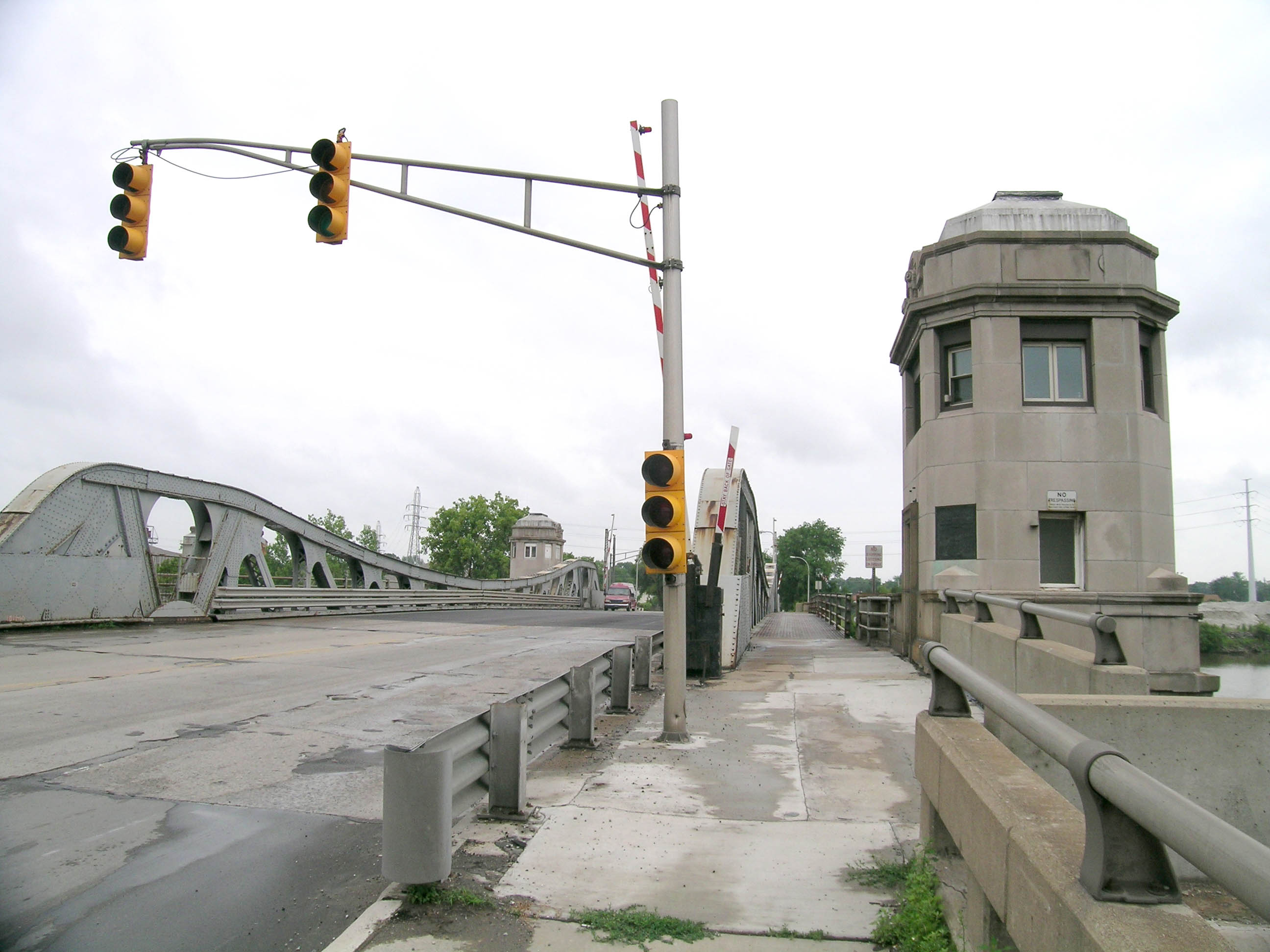
West Jefferson Avenue–Rouge River Bridge

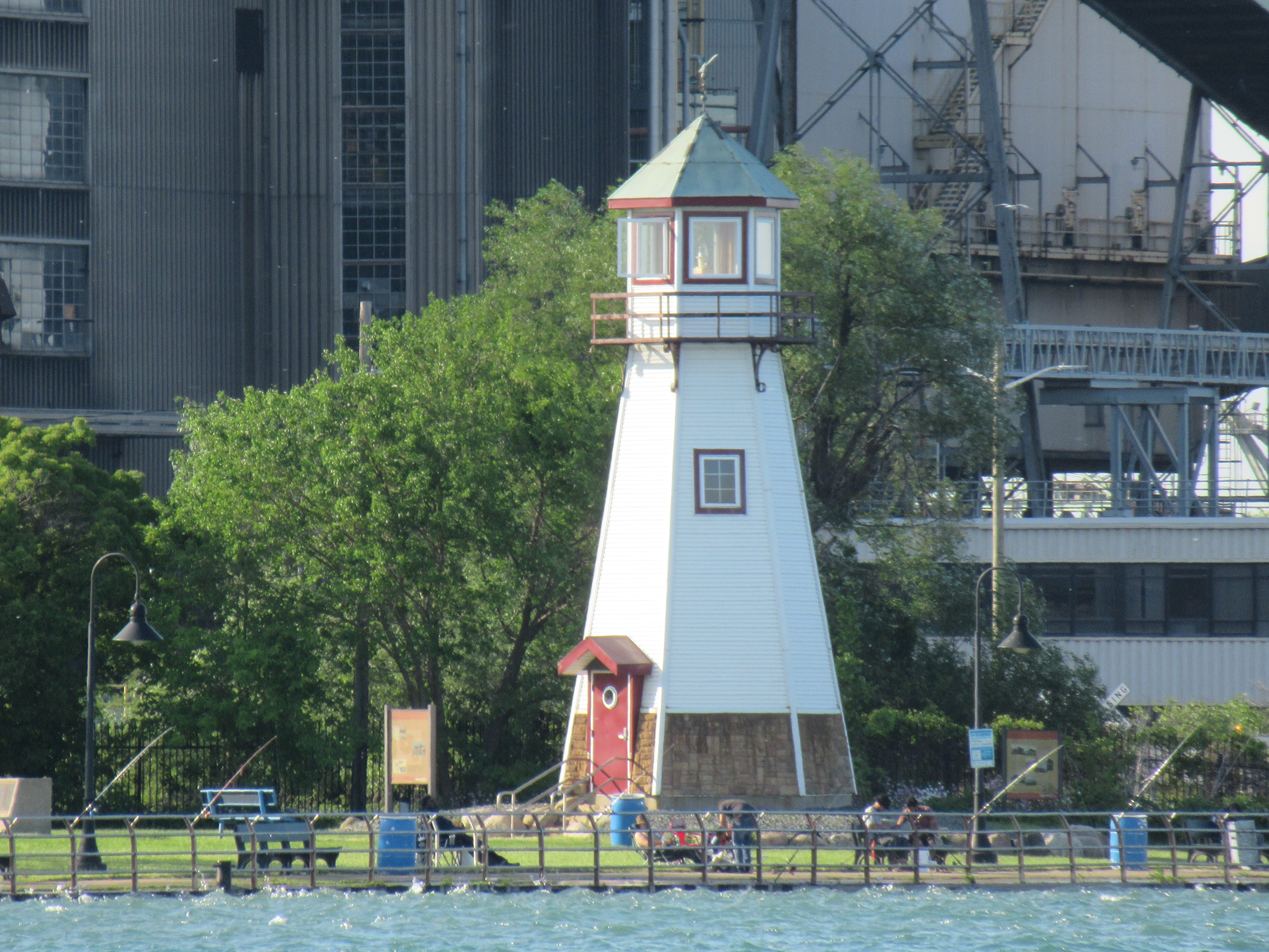
Mariners Memorial Light
