= The Proper People =

American urban exploration YouTuber duo

The Proper People are an urban exploration YouTuber duo, composed of friends Bryan Weissman and Michael Berindei.

The duo are native to Florida. In an interview with Tubefilter, they said they met during primary school, and began posting to YouTube in 2014, during their freshman years in college. Originally both engineering majors, they switched to film after their channels gained popularity. They retroactively named their channel for a no entry sign that read "Access Prohibited — Except by the Proper People". YouTube is their primary income.

In 2016, the duo visited an abandoned power plant, which was decontaminated; its security increased greatly following their visit. They visited Landmark Mall days before its demolition. In 2024, they explored the power plant of the Ford River Rouge complex, which was abandoned after a 1999 explosion. Also in 2024, they explored Ghost Town Village, an amusement park, as well as a prison in New Orleans which was abandoned during Hurricane Katrina. They have also visited a boxing area, a Chinese ghost city, a mental asylum, a mineshaft, and a movie theater, among other places.
