= Ford River Rouge complex =

Automobile factory in Dearborn, Michigan

- Ford River Rouge Complex
- U.S. National Register of Historic Places
- U.S. National Historic Landmark District
- Michigan State Historic Site
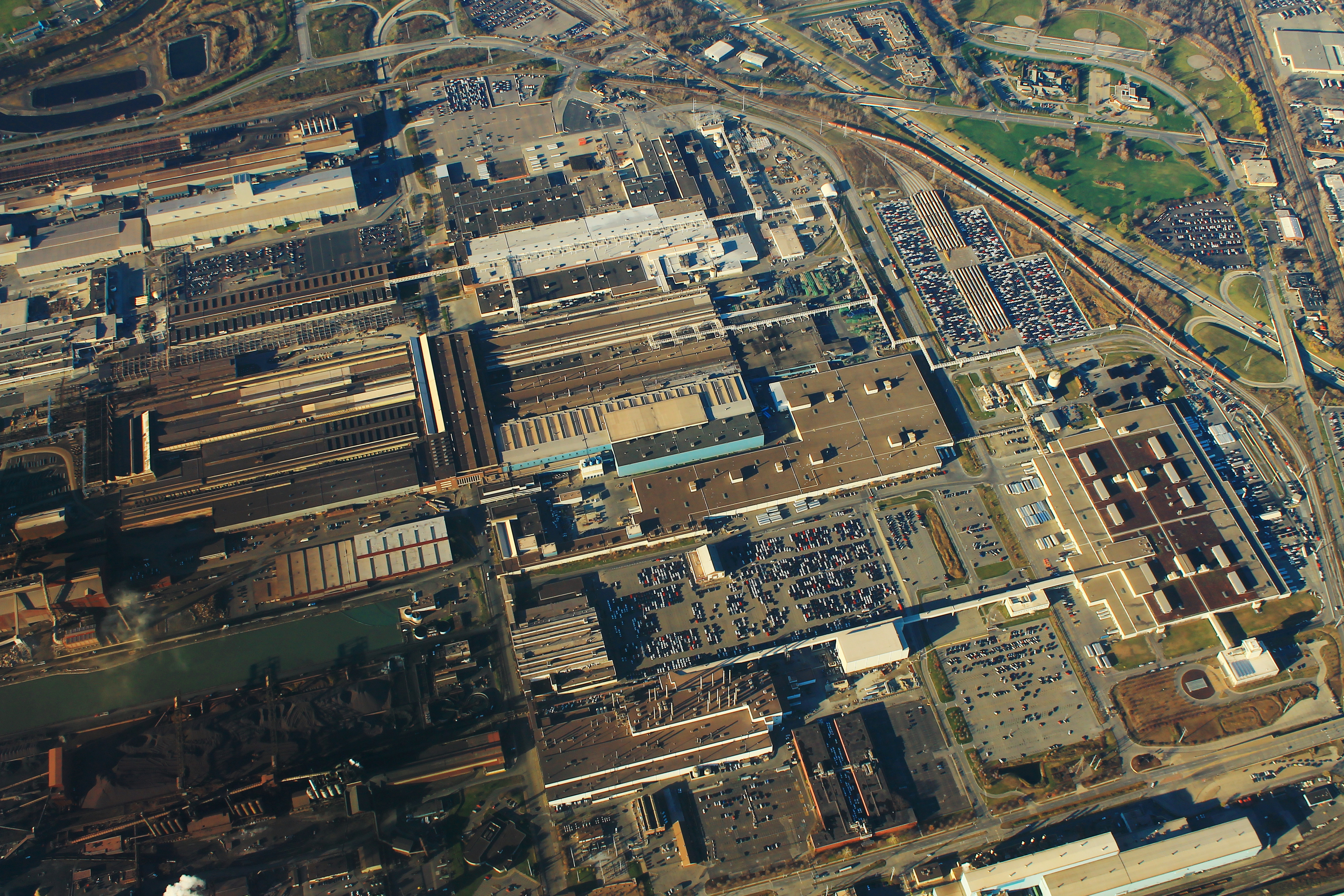
- Aerial view of the Rouge in 2015

- Location within Michigan
- Interactive map
- Location: Dearborn, Michigan, United States
- Coordinates: 42.305°N 83.165°W
- Area: 900 acres (360 ha) (landmarked area)
- Built: 1917–1928
- Architect: Albert Kahn
- Visitation: 148,000 (2017)
- NRHP reference No.: 78001516

Significant dates
- Added to NRHP: June 2, 1978
- Designated NHLD: June 2, 1978
- Designated MSHS: December 14, 1976

The Ford River Rouge complex (officially Ford Rouge Center; commonly known as the Rouge complex, River Rouge, or simply The Rouge) is a Ford Motor Company automobile factory complex located along the River Rouge in Dearborn, Michigan, United States. Completed in 1928, it was declared a National Historic Landmark District in 1978.

== Site and buildings ==
Henry Ford purchased the future site of the Rouge in 1915, with plans to build a bird sanctuary. Plans shifted to manufacturing following a federal request to the Ford Motor Company to produce warships. 'Building B', the first building on the property, was built to fulfill the request. The Rouge complex measures 1.5 miles (2.4 km) wide by 1 mile (1.6 km) long, including 93 buildings with nearly 16 million square feet (1.5 km^{2}) of factory floor space. With its own docks in the dredged Rouge River, 100 miles (160 km) of interior railroad track, its own electricity plant, and integrated steel mill, the titanic Rouge was able to turn raw materials into running vehicles within this single complex, a prime example of vertical-integration production.

Some of the Rouge's buildings were designed by architect Albert Kahn, such as its glass plant in 1925, which replaced Ford's glass production site in Highland Park, Michigan. It measures 760 feet long and 240 feet wide, and its walls features large glass panels. Kahn also designed the tire plant. Completed January 30, 1938, it measures 802 feet in length and 240 feet in width and features a butterfly roof and, similarly to the glass plant, has large glass panels in its walls.

In the second quarter of 1932, through Edsel Ford's support, Mexican muralist Diego Rivera was invited to study the facilities at the Rouge. The studies informed his set of murals known as the Detroit Industry Murals, which is exhibited in the Detroit Institute of Arts.

The Ford Company provides free tours of the facility via bus. They ran from 1924 to 1980, at their peak hosting approximately a million visitors per year. They resumed in 2004, in cooperation with The Henry Ford Museum, with multimedia presentations, as well as a viewing of the assembly floor. In 2017, the Rouge had 148,000 visitors.

The campus is also host to Rouge Steel, which was formerly owned by Ford but was sold to another firm in 1989. The mill is currently owned by Cleveland-Cliffs.

=== Former facilities ===
The Rouge formerly operated a power plant to power the facility. On February 1, 1999, the power plant exploded, killing six workers and critically injuring fourteen others. The explosion was believed to have been caused by Ford's disregard of regulation, and Ford was fined $1.5 million without criminal proceedings. Bronze plaques were installed for the six killed. In 2024, the now-abandoned power plant was explored by The Proper People, an urban exploration YouTube duo.

On May 10, 2004, Ford closed the Dearborn Assembly Plant that it operated for 86 years since 1918. The final vehicle, a red 2004 Mustang GT convertible, was driven off the assembly line by Fred Galicki, a 21-year old employee.

=== Future facilities ===
In September 2020, Ford announced the construction of the Ford Rouge Electric Vehicle Center, costing $700,000,000 to build, for production of the Ford F-150 Lightning, an electric vehicle. On May 18, 2021, President Joe Biden toured the plant and drove an F-150 Lightning before it entered the market. He endorsed electric vehicles during a speech at the plant.

=== Green roof renovation ===
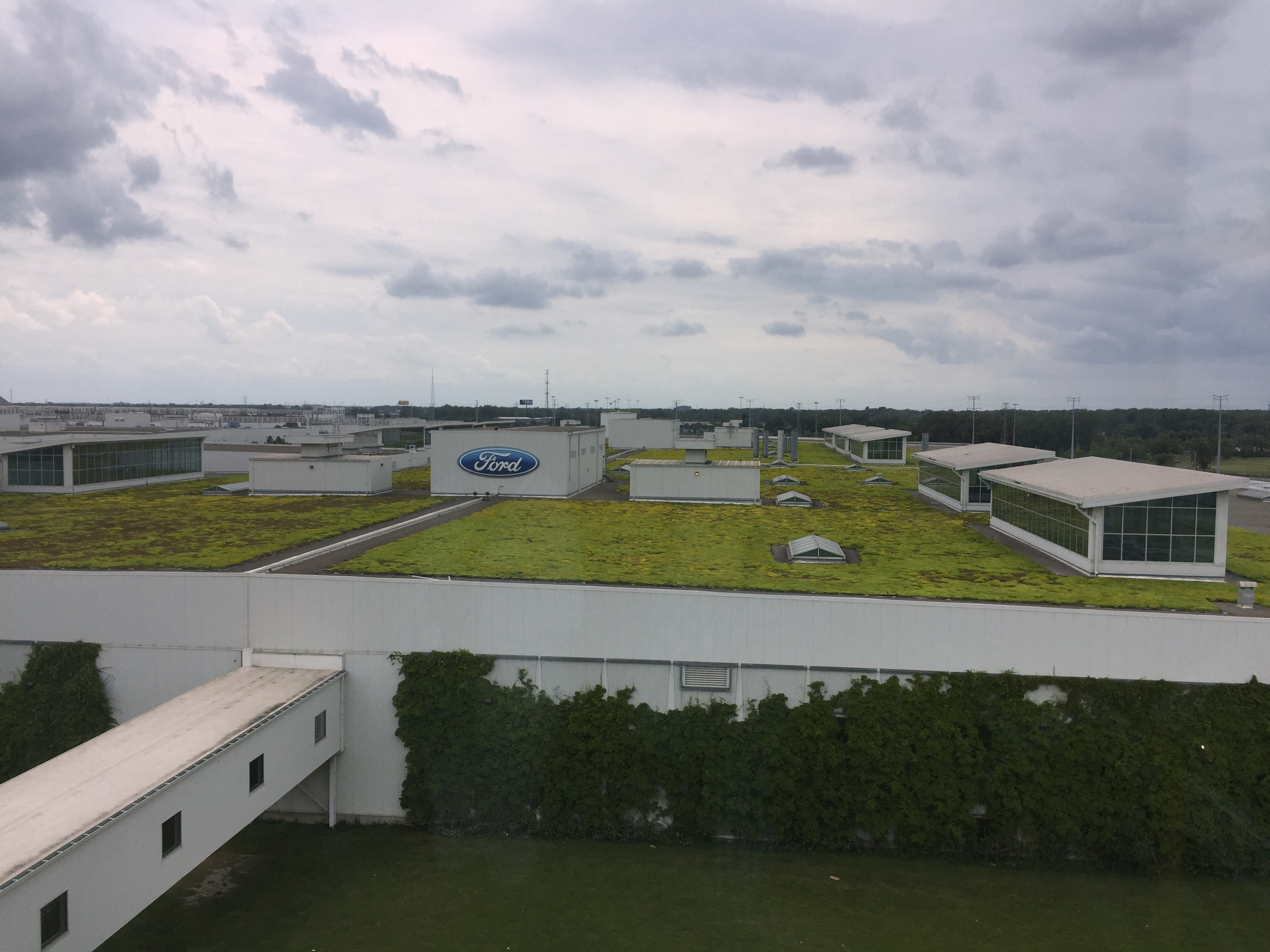
Green roof of the Rouge, 2019

In 1999, architect William McDonough entered into an agreement with Ford Motor Company to redesign its 85-year-old, 1,212-acre (490 ha) River Rouge facility. The roof of the 1.1-million-square-foot (100,000 m^{2}) Dearborn Truck assembly plant was covered with more than 10 acres (4.0 ha) of sedum, a low-growing groundcover. The sedum retains and cleanses rainwater and moderates the internal temperature of the building, saving energy.

The roof is part of an $18 million rainwater treatment system designed to collect and clean rainwater annually, sparing Ford from a $50 million mechanical treatment facility.

== Production history ==
The plant's first products were Eagle-class patrol crafts for the United States Navy, which were never deployed during World War I. The production of the warships led to the widening of the River Rouge, also allowing lake freighters to fit in it. Ford produced tractors at the plant from 1921 to 1927, and following a five-month closure, began producing the Model A at the plant. The plant also produced most of the parts of the Model T, with construction of the vehicles themselves happening in Highland Park.

During World War II, the Rouge complex produced jeeps, aircraft engines, aircraft components and parts, tires, tubes, and armor plates.

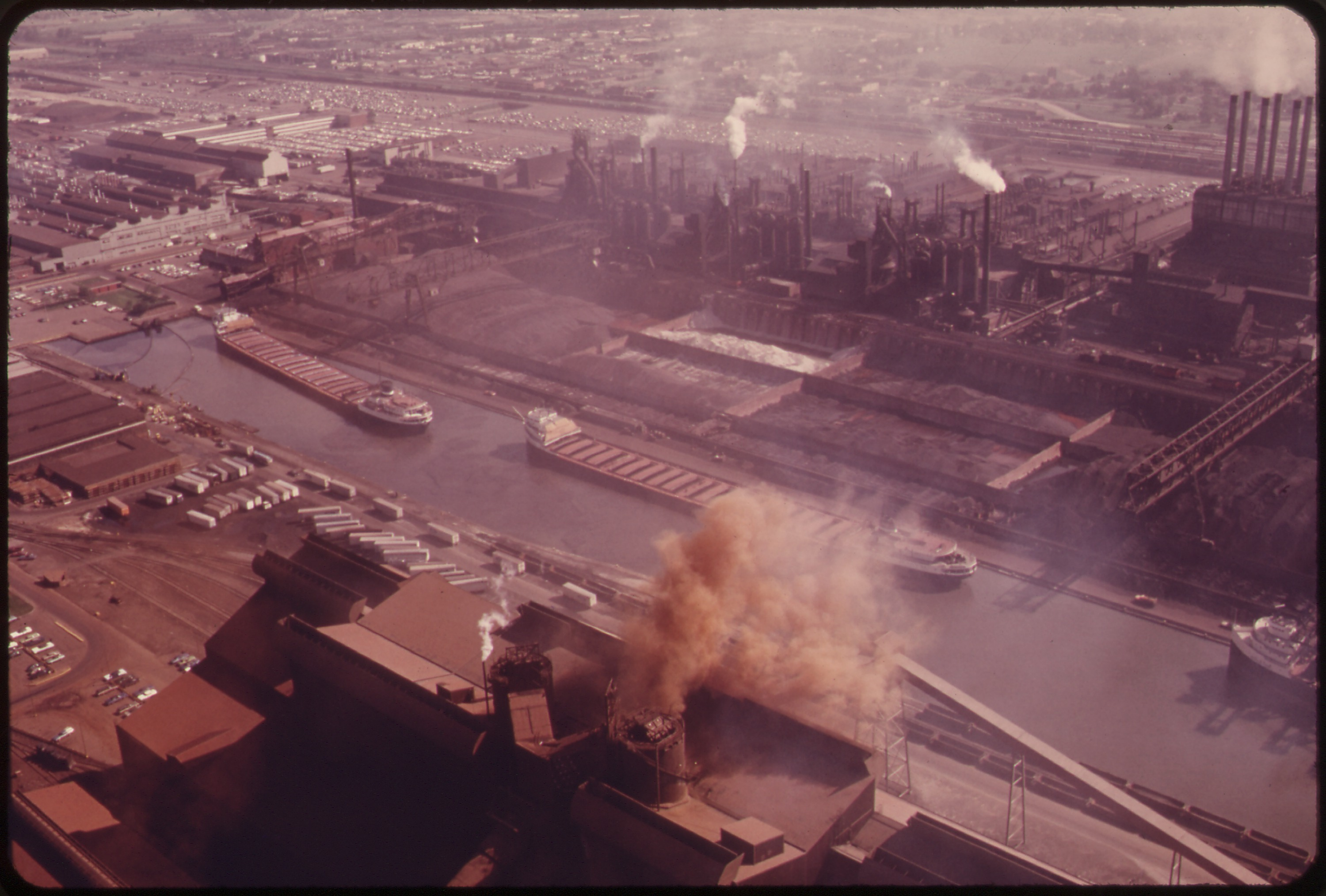
The Rouge in 1973

The Rouge manufactured most of the components of Ford vehicles, starting with the Model T. Many of the vehicles were compiled into "knock-down kits", then sent by railroad to various branch assembly locations across the United States in major metropolitan cities to be locally assembled, using local supplies as necessary.

Throughout four decades, the Rouge produced multiple different Mustang models. It was one of only three locations where Ford manufactured the Mustang; the other sites were Metuchen Assembly in Edison, New Jersey, and San Jose Assembly in Milpitas, California.

In 2019, to celebrate the centennial of the Rouge Plant's opening, Ford produced the Mustang Shelby GT500 at the 2020 Ford Motor Show. At 700 horsepower, it is the most powerful street-legal vehicle. As of its centennial, it is the oldest automobile plant still in operation.

As of 2019, the Rouge has produced F-150s, and as of 2022, F-150 Lightnings.

== Employment and unionization ==
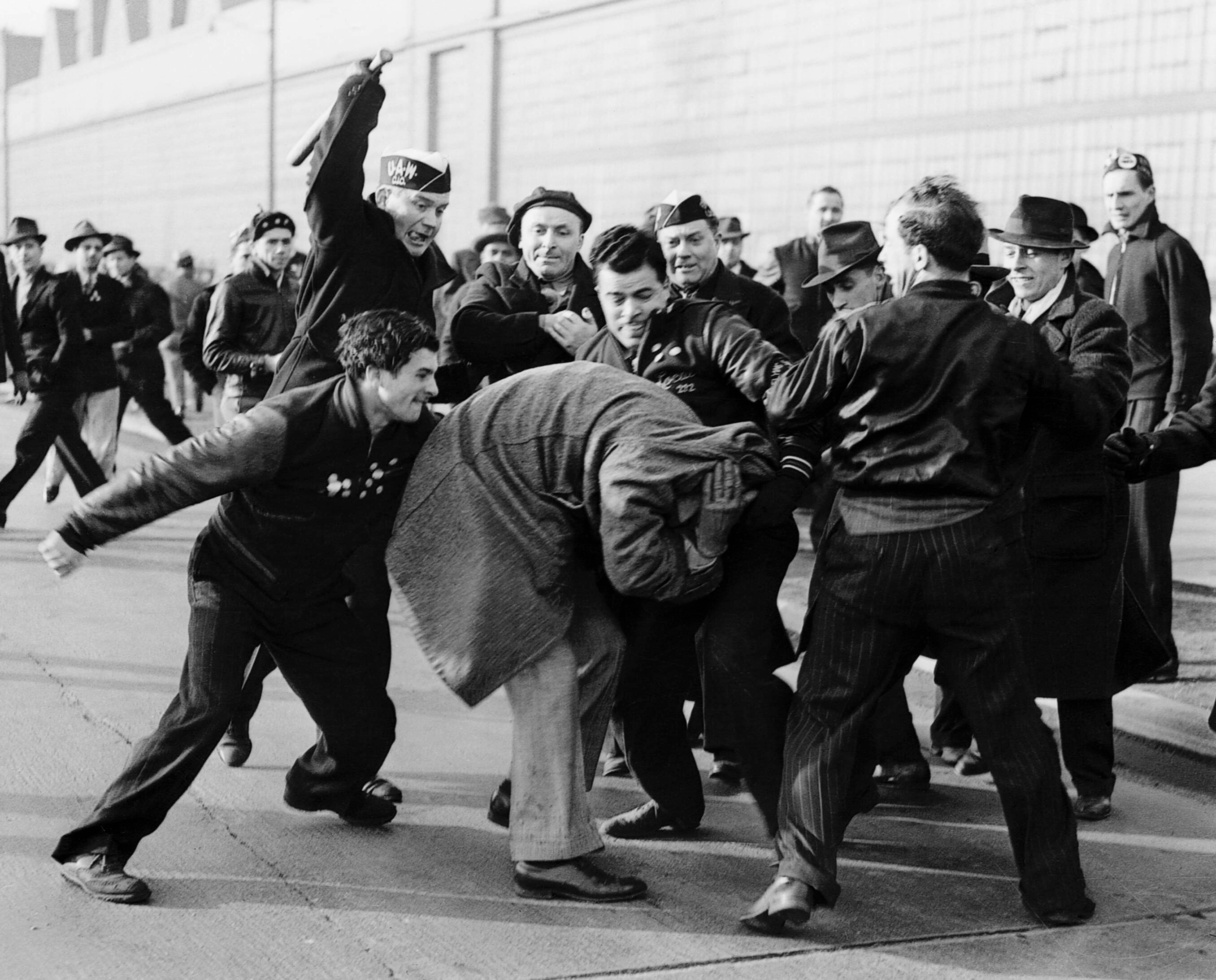
Ford Strikers Riot (1941) by Milton Brooks, depicting a strikebreaker beaten by striking Rouge workers

At its peak, the Rouge employed as many as 100,000 employees.

In March 1932, following mass layoffs, 4–5,000 former employees of the Rouge starved themselves and marched in protest, an event later called the Ford Hunger March.

On May 26, 1937, members of the United Auto Workers (UAW) planned to hand out leaflets, which resulted in an attack by Ford; it is known as the Battle of the Overpass. The UAW was officially recognized by the Rouge on June 20, 1941, with a contract. By 1947, the Rouge plant's union was led by Communist Party USA official James E. Jackson. A caucus of the union to protect African American workers, who made up approximately 25% of employees, in 1949. The caucus' demands were denied due to being red-baited. By 1960, 65% of the plant's employees were African American, with 3.5% considered skilled laborers.

In September 2024, the tool and die makers of the Rouge went on strike over contract disagreements.

== Architectural influence ==
The Rouge complex inspired Renault's 1920 Île Seguin factory, GAZ's 1930s factory in the Soviet Union, Volkswagen's 1938 Wolfsburg factory in Germany, FIAT's 1939 (Mirafiori factory) in Italy as well as the later Hyundai factory complex in Ulsan, South Korea, which was developed beginning in the late 1960s. With some of its buildings designed by architect Albert Kahn, River Rouge was designated as a National Historic Landmark District in 1978 for its architecture and historical importance to the industry and economy of the United States.

In the early stages of the Soviet Union's industrialization, Ford participated in the development of an automobile production complex in Nizhny Novgorod, which drew influence from the River Rouge complex.

Charlie Chaplin studied the Rouge for his 1936 film Modern Times.

== Products made ==
=== Current ===
- Ford F-Series (1948–present)

=== Former ===
- Eagle-class patrol craft (1918–1919)
- Fordson tractor (1921–1928)
- Ford Model T (1920s; parts)
- Ford Model A (1927–1932)
- Ford Model B (1932–1934)
- Ford Model 48 (1935–1936)
- 1937 Ford (1937–1940)
- 1941 Ford (1941–1942, 1946–1949)
- 1949 Ford (1949–1951)
- 1952 Ford (1952–1954)
- Ford Fairlane (1955–1961)
- Ford Thunderbird (1955–1957)
- Ford Mustang (1964–2004)
- Ford F-150 Lightning (2022–2025)
- Mercury Capri (1979–1986)
- Mercury Cougar (1966–1973)

== See also ==
- Ford Dearborn Assembly Plant
- Dearborn Truck Plant
- Ford Piquette Avenue Plant
- Rouge Steel
- National Register of Historic Places listings in Michigan
- List of National Historic Landmarks in Michigan
