= Severstal =

Russian steel and mining company

Severstal PJSC
- Native name: Северсталь
- Type: Public company
- Traded as: MCX: CHMF, LSE: SVST, FWB: RTS2
- Industry: Steel, Mining, Metallurgy
- Founded: 1993
- Headquarters: Cherepovets, Russia
- Key people: Alexey Mordashov (Chairman); Alexander Shevelev (CEO)
- Products: Steel, metalware, large diameter pipe
- Revenue: ₽713 billion (2025)
- Operating income: ₽90.2 billion (2025)
- Net income: ₽32 billion (2025)
- Total assets: ₽853 billion (2025)
- Total equity: ₽527 billion (2025)
- Number of employees: 50,000
- Subsidiaries: Severstal Air Company; Vorkutaugol; Severstal Cherepovets
- Website: www.severstal.com

Severstal (Russian: Северсталь, lit. 'Northern Steel') is a Russian company mainly operating in the steel and mining industry, headquartered in Cherepovets. Severstal is listed on the Moscow Exchange and LSE and is the largest steel company in Russia. The company is majority-owned and controlled by billionaire Alexey Mordashov.

Severstal owns major industrial facilities in Russia, Ukraine, Kazakhstan, France, and Italy, as well as in several African countries. The company also has mining assets, thus securing its supply of raw materials.

Severstal also owns Severstal Cherepovets, a professional ice hockey club which plays in the Kontinental Hockey League and Severstal Air Company, an airline operating mainly from Vnukovo International Airport and Cherepovets Airport.

Severstal has been ranked as among the 16th best of 92 oil, gas, and mining companies on indigenous rights and resource extraction in the Arctic. It's ranked 37 among the largest steel makers. In 2021, Severstal was ranked no. 27 out of 120 oil, gas, and mining companies involved in resource extraction north of the Arctic Circle in the Arctic Environmental Responsibility Index (AERI). In 2021, the company's revenue amounted to 770 billion rubles.

== History ==
=== 1930s–1993: formation and transformation ===
During the early 1930s, deposits of iron ore were discovered on the Kola Peninsula and, at about the same time large quantities of coal were found in the area of Pechora. These two factors made it possible to establish a viable steel industry in the northwest of Russia.

In 1940, the Government of the Soviet Union published a resolution "On The Organisation of Steel Making in the North-West of the USSR", which created a steel mill in Cherepovets, a city accessible by both the Leningrad-Ekaterinburg railway and by the Volga–Baltic Waterway.

In 1947, the construction of Cherepovets Steel Mill was completed.

Facility construction accelerated after the end of World War II, and at 3:25 PM on 24 August 1955, the Cherepovets steel mill was put into operation. Development continued in the following decades, making Cherepovets a major centre of steel production in the Soviet Union.

On 24 September 1993, a decree by the President of Russia, Boris Yeltsin, transformed the state-owned Cherepovets Iron and Steel Complex into the Severstal open joint-stock company.

=== 2004–2011: international expansion and acquisitions ===
In 2004, Severstal North America was created when Severstal acquired all the steelmaking assets of Rouge Steel, based in Michigan, USA.

In April 2005, Severstal acquired a 19.9% stake in European steel producer Gruppo Lucchini.

In June 2005, Severstal was listed on MICEX SE.

In March 2006, the company launched an offer for the French conglomerate Arcelor. The offer did not materialize. Arcelor was instead acquired by Mittal Steel Company on 25 June 2006 to create ArcelorMittal.

In April 2006, Severstal and Arcelor inaugurated the Severgal joint venture, at that time owned 75% by Severstal and 25% by Arcelor.

In April 2006, Severstal acquired British wire producer Carrington Wire.

In October 2006, Severstal acquired a controlling stake in Lucchini.

In November 2006, Severstal Global Depository Receipts began trading on the London Stock Exchange, priced at $12.50 per share.

In May 2007, Severstal acquired Arcelor's 25% stake in Severgal.

In May 2007, Severstal acquired a further 9% of Lucchini.

In February 2007, Severstal acquired Celtic Resources, a gold mining company with assets in Russia and Kazakhstan.

In September 2007, Severcorr began operations in Columbus, Mississippi.

In October 2007, Severstal acquired Aprelkovo and Nerungri Metallic, two gold mines in Eastern Russia.

In May 2008, Severstal Metiz TAS agreed to the sale of the group's 34.6% share of JSC Dneprometiz to Severstal Metiz.

In May 2008, Severstal acquired Sparrows Point, a steel mill in Maryland, USA, from Arcelor Mittal.

In May 2008, Severstal Resources acquired a controlling stake in an iron ore deposit in Western Africa and became a shareholder of Mano River Resources.

In June 2008, Severstal acquired Esmark Inc., based in West Virginia, USA.

In July 2008, Severstal acquired WCI Steel mill in Warren, Ohio, USA.

In August 2008, Severstal Metiz acquired 100% of Redaelli Tecna.

In August 2008, Severstal Resources acquired Balazhal Gold Mine in Kazakhstan.

In November 2008, the company acquired PBS Coals based in Pennsylvania, USA.

In November 2008, Severstal Resources acquired a controlling stake in High River Gold.

In 2008, the company began a $500 million expansion to double the output of Severstal Columbus to 3.4 million tons.

In January 2010, the company closed Carrington Wire.

In March 2010, the company acquired all the shares of Gruppo Lucchini from the Lucchini family and became the only shareholder of the company.

In June 2010, the company sold a 50.8% stake in Lucchini S.p.A. to a company controlled by Alexey Mordashov.

In October 2010, the company acquired a 43.21% stake in Crew Gold.

In October 2010, the company created Nord Gold Nv.

In October 2010, the company received a license for the Centralnoe coalfield in Tyva.

In November 2010, an MOU with NSDC to build a steel mill in India was signed.

In January 2011, the company acquired the remaining shares of Crew Gold.

In March 2011, the company sold its facilities in Warren, Wheeling and Sparrows Point.

=== Developments since 2013 ===
On 11 February 2013, the company's Vorkutinskaya mine, in the Komi Republic in northern Russia, experienced an explosion that caused the mine to collapse on a team of 22 people. A total of 18 people lost their lives in the accident.

In March 2012, the company separated from Nord Gold.

In 2014, Severstal divested its steelmaking operations in the United States, selling the former Rouge Steel plant in Dearborn, Michigan to AK Steel Holding for $700 million, and its mini-mill in Columbus, Mississippi, built in 2007, to Steel Dynamics for $1.63 billion.

In January 2017, the company sold Redaelli Tecna.

In July 2017, the company acquired the debt of the Yakovlevsky mine.

In December 2021, according to the group's decarbonization strategy, Severstal agreed to sell "Vorkutaugol" to "Russkaya energia" LLC for 15 billion roubles. The approval of the deal was postponed by Federal Antimonopoly Service in February 2022.

== International sanctions ==
Following the 2022 Russian invasion of Ukraine, the European Union sanctioned Severstal's majority shareholder, Alexey Mordashov, on 28 February. This forced the company to cease its steel shipments to Europe.

In 2023, along with other major Russian corporations, Severstal was included in the sanctions lists of Australia, Canada, the United Kingdom, and the United States. According to the British authorities, "PJSC Severstal is and has been obtaining a benefit from or supporting the Government of Russia by carrying on business in a sector of strategic significance, namely the Russian extractives sector and; (2) PJSC Severstal is owned or controlled directly or indirectly by a person involved in obtaining a benefit from or supporting the Government of Russia, namely Alexey Mordashov." According to the Australian authorities, measures against Severstal and other sanctioned companies "aim to slow Russia's war machine."

== Sustainable development and corporate responsibility ==
Sustainable development is one of the strategic priorities for Severstal, as stated in its annual reports. Starting 2010, the company has annually released a Corporate Social Responsibility and Sustainable Development report.

In 2018, Severstal joined the UN Global Compact.

At the same time, since 2000, Severstal has been a sponsor and patron of TK-20 Severstal, a nuclear submarine of the Russian Navy, which was renamed after the company in 2001. In 2000-2005 alone, Severstal donated 5.5 million rubles to support the submarine and its crew.

== Environment ==
In 2018, Severstal became one of the pilots of the World Steel Association's programme to reduce greenhouse gas emissions by the global steel industry 'Step up'.

In June 2019, in connection with the Presidential Decree dated 7 May 2018 No. 204 "On the National Goals and Strategic Objectives of the Development of the Russian Federation for the Period up to 2024" and the Federal Project "Clean Air", Severstal agreed on co-operation for reducing air emissions in Cherepovets with the Ministry of Natural Resources and Ecology, Rosprirodnadzor and the local authorities. In accordance with this agreement, the company assumed obligations to ensure the implementation of measures that will reduce pollutant emissions by 30 thousand tons into the atmosphere by 2024.

Severstal reported Total CO2e emissions (Direct + Indirect) for the twelve months ending 31 December 2020 at 27,860 Kt (-250 /-0.9% y-o-y). There is no evidence of a consistent declining trend as yet.

Severstal's annual Total CO2e emissions (Direct + Indirect) (in kilotonnes)
Dec 2017	Dec 2018	Dec 2019	Dec 2020
27,530	27,770	28,110	27,860
