= Rouge Steel =

Steel mill in Dearborn, Michigan, U.S.

Coordinates: 42°18′13″N 83°09′18″W

This steelmaking plant was originally part of the Ford Motor Company, which created an integrated manufacturing complex to produce all major vehicle components at one large facility called The Rouge. In 1989, Ford's steel mill assets were divested and became known as Rouge Industries with the steel operations trading as Rouge Steel Company in Dearborn, Michigan, outside of Detroit.

The steel mill operations occupy most of the portion of the Rouge Complex south of Road 4, which connects Gates 4 and 10.

Around 2004, Severstal North America was formed when Russian Severstal purchased the bankrupt Rouge Steel. After Severstal North America purchased other steel making facilities, this plant was renamed Severstal Dearborn.

Recent major capital expenditures include a new, state-of-the-art Blast Furnace "C" that began operation in 2007 (followed shortly by an explosion and subsequent dismantling of Blast Furnace "B".) In 2011, Severstal Dearborn completed the construction of a continuous linked pickle line tandem cold mill (PLTCM) and a hot-dip galvanizing line (HDGL.)

Per the Detroit Free Press article of July 14, 2011, Severstal Dearborn will be installing a new annealing line in the "W" section of their existing cold mill.

On 21 July 2014, AK Steel Holding announced that it had agreed to purchase Severstal's Dearborn steel-making assets for $700 million cash. The acquisition would also include a coke-making facility and interests in three joint ventures that process flat-rolled steel products. Severstal also announced at that time that it would sell a separate steel-making facility in Columbus, Mississippi to Steel Dynamics for $1.63 billion.

Cleveland-Cliffs acquired AK Steel Dearborn Works in 2020.

== Facilities ==
- 1 Blast Furnace (plus 1 decommissioned blast furnace)
- 2 Basic Oxygen Furnaces (BOF)
- 2 Continuous strip casting machines with 3 strands total
- 1 Pickling line operational (new PLTCM), 3 being partially stripped of spare parts, demolished, and scrapped:

Both formerly operating pickling lines use Taylor-Winfield flash welders; both operating pickling lines include Wean United mill sections that are unused.

- 1 Tandem mill (PLTCM)
- Annealing bases and ovens:

1 Tempering mill operational, 1 sitting unusable (un-upgraded and stripped for spares)

- 3 coating lines
- 1 Decommissioned Electric Arc Furnace (EAF)
- 1 Decommissioned 68" Hot Strip Mill (HSM) with 3 slab reheat furnaces
- 1 Decommissioned Cold mill

== Indicative annual capacity ==
- Hot rolled sheet – 3.6 million metric tonnes (2007)
- Cold rolled sheet – 1.4 million metric tonnes (2007)
- Galvanized sheet – 0.8 million metric tonnes (2007)

== Products ==
Severstal Dearborn produces flat-rolled products, including hot rolled band and hot rolled processed sheet, cold rolled sheet, hot dipped galvanized sheet, electro galvanized sheet, and aluminum coated boron and other advanced steels.

=== Hot rolled products ===
Severstal Dearborn's 68 in. hot strip mill has an annual throughput of 3.8 million tons (3.5 million metric tons). The hot strip mill can roll to a minimum gauge of .050 in. through .525 in. (1.27 mm through 13.30 mm) in widths from 30 in. to 61 in. (762 mm to 1,549 mm). The recently modernized slab reheat furnaces optimize Severstal Dearborn's heating efficiency and quality, reduce natural gas consumption and increase yield.

=== Cold rolled products ===
The Severstal Dearborn's cold mill produces 1.8 million tons (1.6 million metric tons) of steel in thicknesses from 0.014 in. through 0.110 in. (0.36 mm through 2.79 mm) with widths form 28 in. to 61 in. (711 mm to 1,549 mm). A cornerstone of Severstal Dearborn's modernization will be the most sophisticated pickle tandem cold mill (PLTCM) in the world. The PLTCM will roll to a minimum gauge of 0.012 in. (0.30 mm) and final width of up to 72 in. (1,850 mm) with product flatness requirements of less than 15 I-units.

=== Coated products ===
Severstal Dearborn's coating capabilities include one of the largest electrogalvanizing lines and hot-dipped galvanizing capabilities. Also part of the Dearborn modernization will be a new hot-dip galvanizing line which will include controls for coating thickness and surface texture as well as alloy and phase control. The line will be capable of producing 496,000 tons (450,000 metric tons) of exposed hot dipped galvanized (HDGI) and exposed hot dipped galvanneal (HDGA) steel. These capabilities are, and will be used to produce steels such as high-end automotive products, dual-phase, transformation-induced plasticity (TRIP) and high reduction interstitial-free steels for customers in the automotive, appliance, and furniture industries.

== Raw materials and logistics ==
Iron ore comes up the Rouge River on ore freighters and is unloaded. Coils of steel leave the cold mfill on tractor trailers and railcars.

== Expansion projects ==
The continuous annealing process will help make this plant one of the most efficient in the US. As of April 2011, work has begun on preparing the "W" section of the existing cold mill for the eventual installation of the continuous annealing line.
