= 1921–1928 Newport, Kentucky steel strike =

Newport, Kentucky steel strike
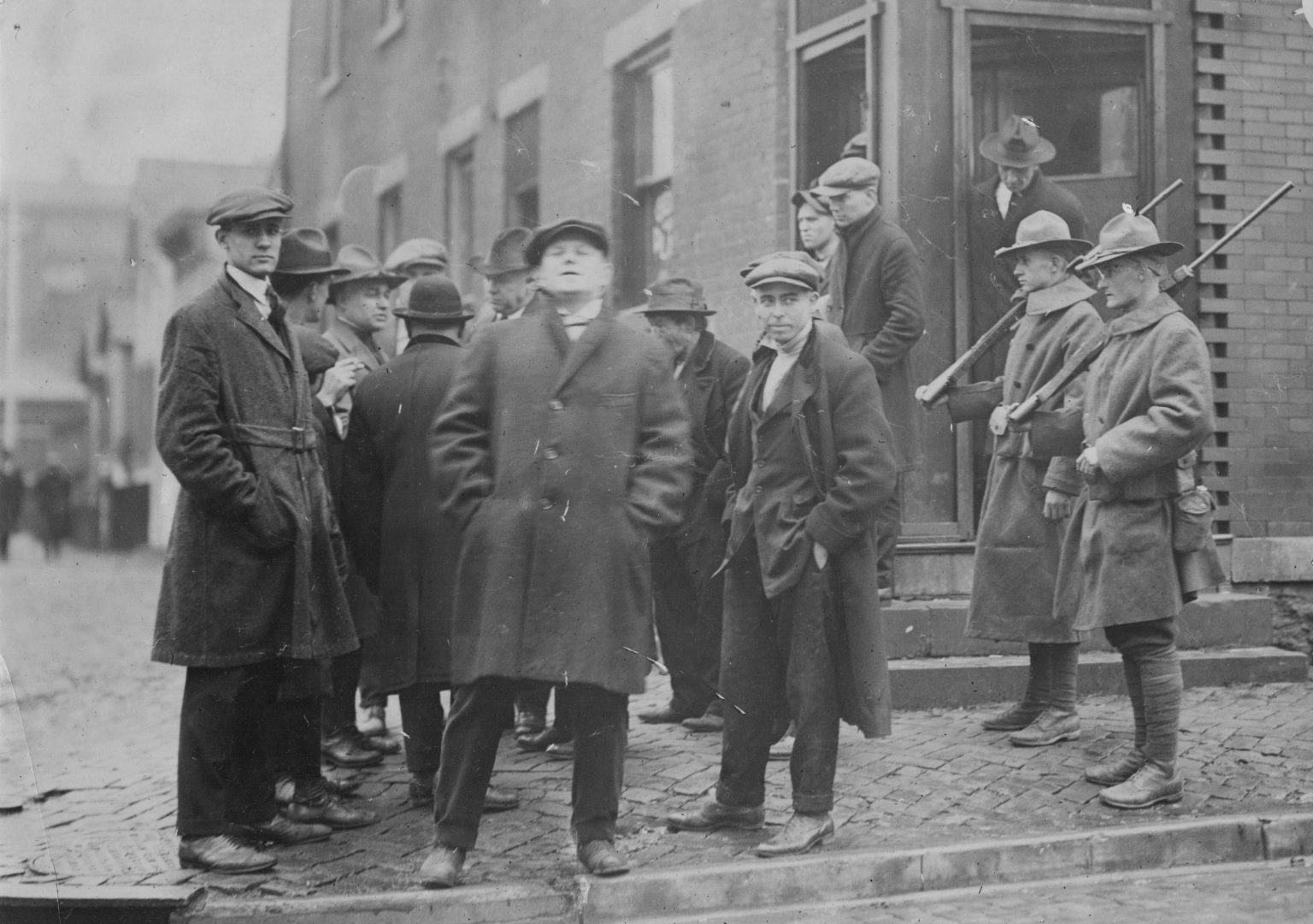
- Strike supporters standing beside militia soldiers outside the Newport steel mills; published December 26, 1921
- Date: Practically: October 5, 1921 - April 1922; Officially: October 5, 1921 - July 7, 1928
- Location: Newport, Kentucky
- Caused by: Wage reduction to 28¢/hour and attempt to force open shop by Andrews Steel Co.

Parties
| Amalgamated Association of Iron, Steel, & Tin Workers (AA): Highly skilled workers: (Note: Local 5 had been recognized for 30 year prior to this strike); Local 5; Skilled to unskilled workers: (Note: These locals had been unrecognized up till the WW1 when they gained more power); Local 15, Galvanizing plant; Local 16, Corrugating plant; Local 17, Steel plant | Andrews Steel Co. Kentucky Army National Guard |

Lead figures
| Local Presidents: J.L Williams, No. 17; Joseph Gaffney, No. 16; Elmer Sentney, No. 15; Edward Miller, No. 5; National: Michael F. Tighe, president; Walter Larkin, VP | William N. Andrews (Owner); Governor Edwin P. Morrow; Colonel Henry H. Denhardt |

Number
| ~2,500 | |

Casualties and losses
| Numerous arrests Injuries: +20 strikers | Injuries: +5 Strikebreakers Deaths: 3 Militia men (accidental discharge, friendly fire) |

The 1921–1928 Newport, Kentucky steel strike was a labor dispute between steel workers in Newport, Kentucky and Andrews Steel Co., the owners of the Andrew Steel Plant and Newport Rolling Mill.

The strike was primarily over continued union recognition of the three unskilled steel locals who had won collective bargaining during World War I. Following the end of the war the company refused to recognize them, only recognizing the skilled local No. 5. This was part of a much broader anti-union open shop push by employers all across America postwar.

During the strike a significant amount of conflict occurred, first with the private armed militia hired by the company and the strikers, and later with the Kentucky National Guard after Governor Morrow would call them in, including eventually the use of Tank Corps. In total a least +25 were injured during the strike. It was also marked by Prohibition and a crackdown on alcohol and gambling in Newport by militia, who were accused of using it as a pretext to crackdown on strikers and public officials who supported them. Including the charging of the Mayor of Newport on conspiracy charges, which would later be dropped.

The strike would ultimately be broken, unofficially ending in late April, 1922 with many workers finding jobs in other mills. It officially ended on July 7, 1928, when the union formally called off the strike.

== Background ==
The dispute began with four union locals when Andrews Steel Co. attempted to institute a wage reduction to 28¢ an hour and to change the workplace from a closed union shop to an open shop. The strike involved one in five of all workers in the town, as it was the dominant industry.

During World War I, the three less skilled steel union locals No. 15, 16 & 17 gained greater bargaining power then they had before and gained union recognition. While Local No. 5, the highly skilled steel workers had already been a recognized union by the company for 30 years.

The steel industry faced a downturn as a result of overproduction of steel by business owners during the war, where steel demand plummeted after the war's end. The labor contract then expired in early 1921, where the company swiftly announced they would no longer recognize Locals No. 15, 16, & 17 and their intent on establishing an open shop. The company attempted to establish a separate agreement with Local No. 5, but they refused, in solidarity with the other unions.

Contract negotiations further broke down after company owner William N. Andrews told the union negotiator to "go to hell." Where after, union workers called the strike.

== Strike ==
On October 5, 1921, workers at Andrews Steel Co. began the strike after voting in favor the day before.

The main contention for workers was not the reduction in wages. But instead the company's refusal to recognize the union locals for those in the unskilled labor section of the Newport Rolling Mill. Union members made a statement in December they were willing to take a cut in wages, but wouldn't return under an open shop plan. The two mills the proposal would effect employed more than 2,000 workers together.

On November 30, the company threatened that they would fire any employee who refused the new proposed wage and open shop. The letter began as follows:

"This letter is for you and your family, to be discussed at your home... We would like you to give it full consideration. We feel that you, yourself, right down in your own heart would like to see this mill run like it used to five or ten years ago as one happy family, instead of the unrest we have had in the past three years."

It reportedly had little effect.

On December 8, strikers were put under an injunction by Judge A.M.J Cochran, of the U.S District Court to make it illegal for them to picket. This injunction was made permanent on December 15. Reportedly, seven strikebreakers were shot at that Thursday morning while in an automobile leaving from the plant (Note: 11th St. Bridge) but, no was injured in the event.

A few days before December 16, the company set up 36 machine guns at the plants. The company also hired a private armed force, described by one as "gray-eyed mountaineers with rifles".

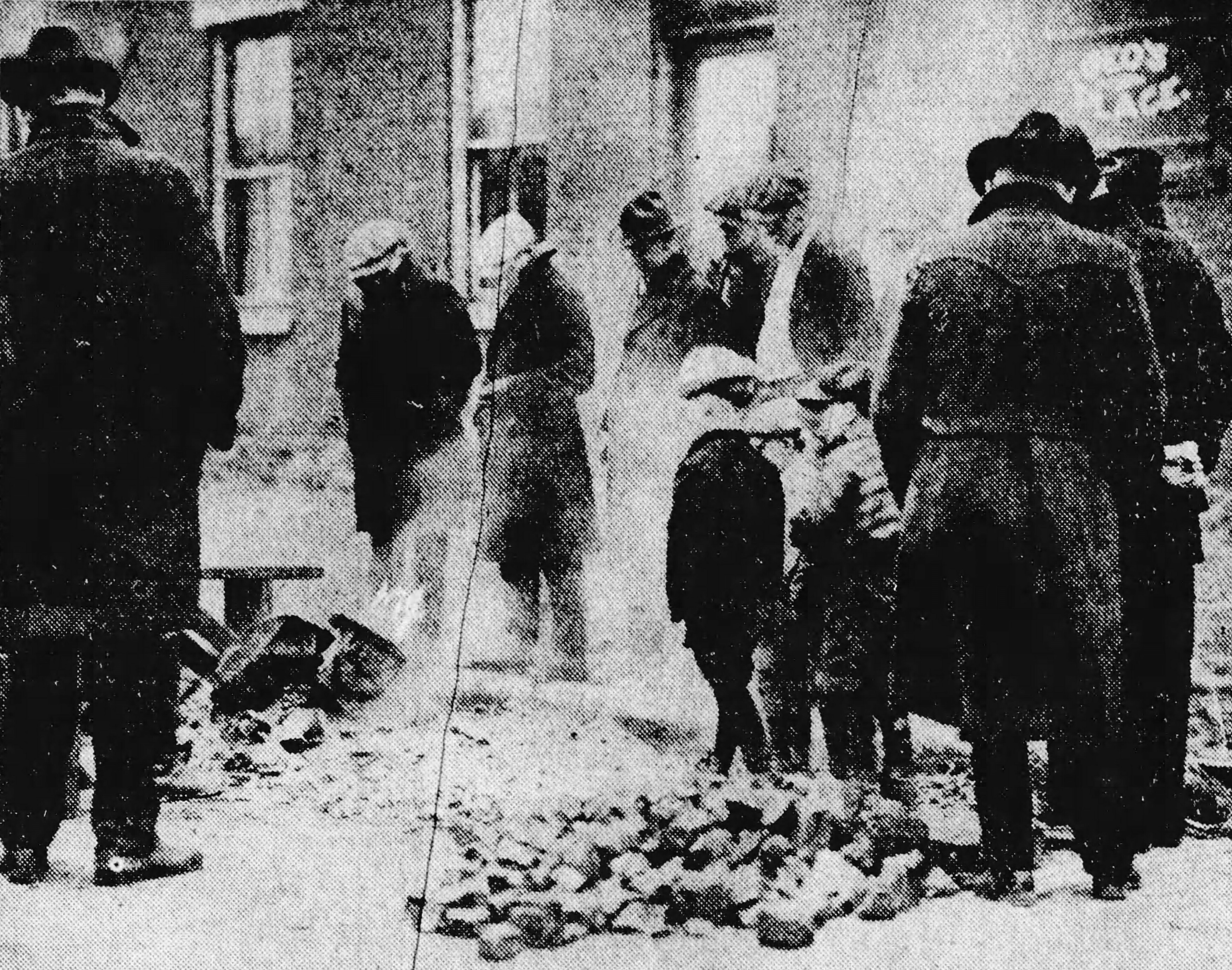
Picketers around a campfire,
Kentucky Post Dec. 16, 1921

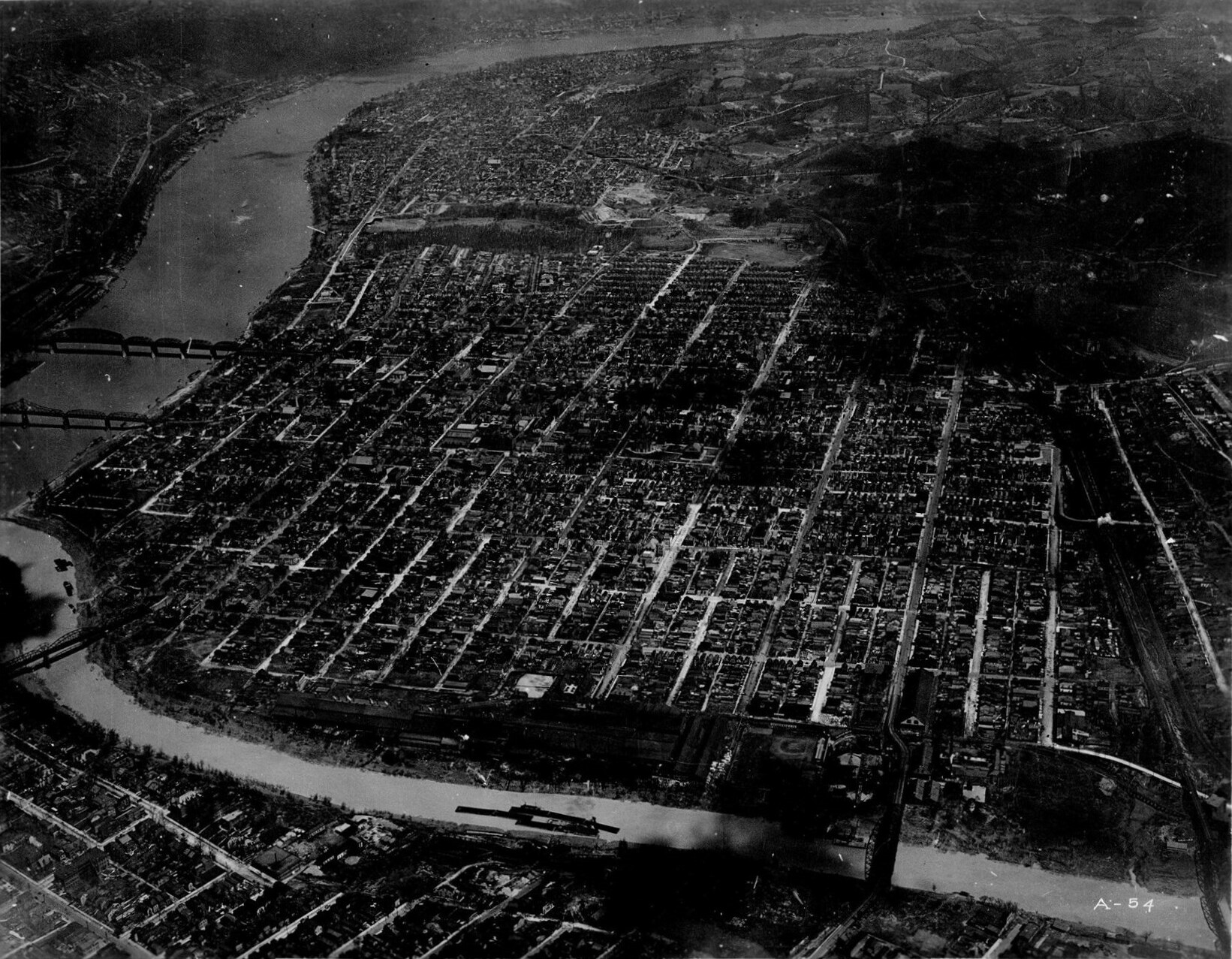
1923 aerial photo, large rolling steel mill shown on bottom by river banks.

The workers picketed as follows; At the corner of each street leading to the mill, strikers stood guard around makeshift campfires. They would stop anyone passing by to ask where they were going and inform them about the strike. The presence was 24/7 and shifts changed twice a day and twice a night. They also had a soup kitchen set up at the back of a local grocery and surrounding tenants helped provide coals for the campfires, both which help sustain the picket. At night searchlights on the plants owned by the company (Note: Originally set up during the war) would then flood the streets with blinding light at night.

On December 16 at 8pm, (Note: At 6th & Brighton St.) a strikebreaker leaving the plant was reported to have fired shots at several strikers who were on picket duty. According to police, the strikebreaker then ran before he could be apprehended. This incident was filed by nearby police patrolmen and several complaints filed by residents about the shooting.

The next day, Judge Wolff handed down a ruling making it illegal for more than two men to publicly assembly at paths leading to the company plants. Two strikebreakers were shot at on 9th and Brighton street as they were on their way into the plant, past a large crowd. Workers continued picketing.

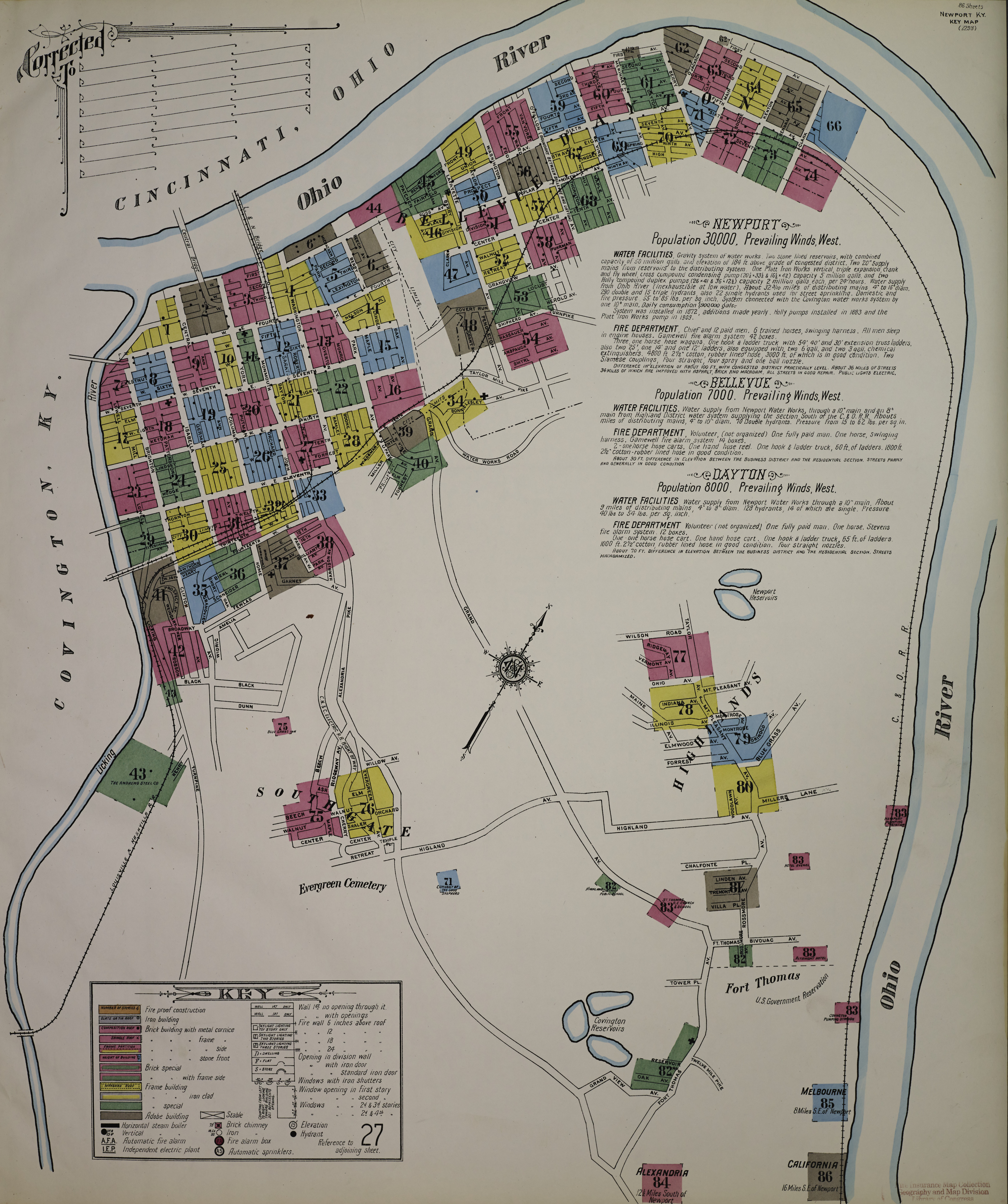
Newport fire insurance map 1910; reported gunshots, 1921
Yellow: shots at strikebreakers; Red: shots at strikers, citizens

Reported gunshots marked on interactive map, 1921 Yellow: shots at strikebreakers; Red: shots at strikers, citizens Red circle: barrages

The same morning the Newport Rolling Mill Co.'s plant fired shots from its machine guns, at 3:25 o'clock that Saturday morning. A nearby resident who lived by the plant, (Note: 534 W. Eight St., Newport) William O'Connell, told police a bullet was fired into her home. Eugene Weatherby, police chief of directly adjacent city of Cincinnati, corroborated this, hearing shots fired early that morning. Plant owner W.N. Andrews denied this. Later that day, at 5 pm her husband heard two more shots.

At 7am December 19, (Note: Two sources report the shooting as having happened Monday. While another says on or before Saturday.) two strikebreakers were shot at on 9th and Brighton street as they were on their way into the plant, past a large crowd. With Chester Starnes shot in the left leg, and Stanley Leifheit shot in the chest & left leg. That day the company would also publicly mention appealing to Kentucky Governor Edwin P. Morrow to send in state troops to the town. With company owner W.N Andrews stating, "unless the city government protects our property and men we will have to appeal to Governor Morrow to send us protection."

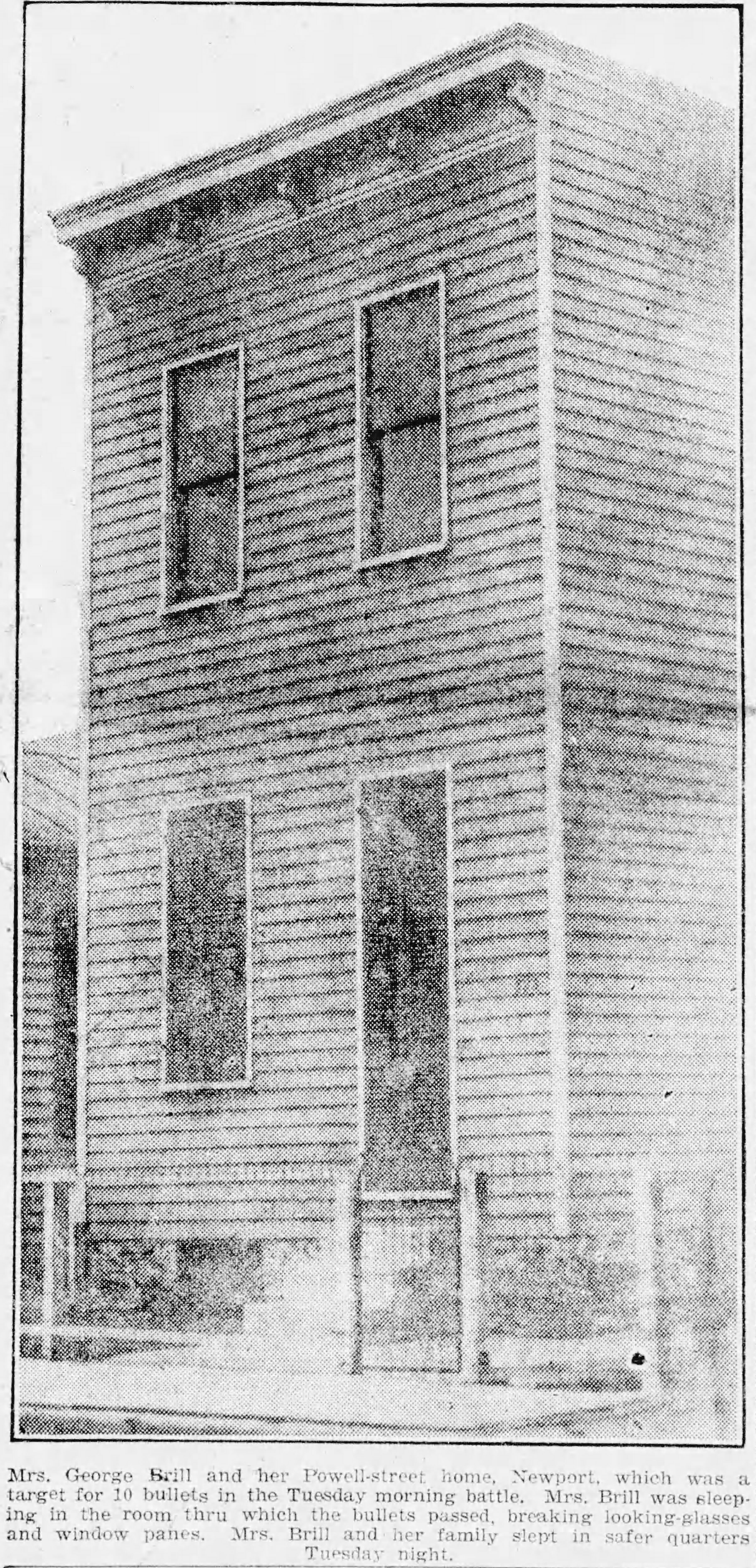
Powell St. home riddled with bullets, narrowly missing Mrs. Brill when she was sleeping by the window.

Early in the morning on December 20, (Note: One non-local source says December 21) a barrage of around 200 bullets, hit 20 houses. Nobody known was hit but reportedly some had narrow escapes. Nearby local residents uninvolved with the strike reported bullets hitting their homes, and coming from the steel plant. That day women in the town formed a delegation to call on Mayor Hermann to stop the indiscriminate firing from the plant.

When Governor Morrow was asked whether he would be sending troops to Newport he replied, "I'm not answering rumors, but when I send troops, you will know it."

On Thursday, December 22, Christ Ebert, Newport commissioner of public safety, also sent a letter to Edwin P. Morrow asking him to not intervene, saying:

"Whatever disorder we have had has come from sympathizers and not strikers, the strikers themselves have appealed to me to help them prohibit the congregating of crowds upon the streets... I assure you that the situation is well taken care of and that every effort to forestall further disorder will be exercised. Union men Thursday denied propaganda which is being spread in Newport and Northern Kentucky that snipers have been stationed in houses in the 'strike zone' and the moonshine whiskey flows freely."

Newport Rev. W. B. Harvey (Note: of the First Baptist Church, Eight & York Streets) also sent letters to both to the union and Newport Rolling Mill Co. offering to help hold negotiations between representatives each side selects with meeting to allow the public to attend. The union accepted the offer after receiving the letter.

That Friday night starting at 10 pm, bullets were shot from the mill into the Newport neighborhood. (Note: Brighton St.) (Note: December 23) The big searchlight on the mill was turned on Brighton street. Then there was a general rush to cover by picketers, and sympathizers standing on the street. Newport local police also took cover. Then shots rung out from the mill. That night Governor Morrow ordered four militia companies to arrive in Newport the next day.

=== Troops arrive ===
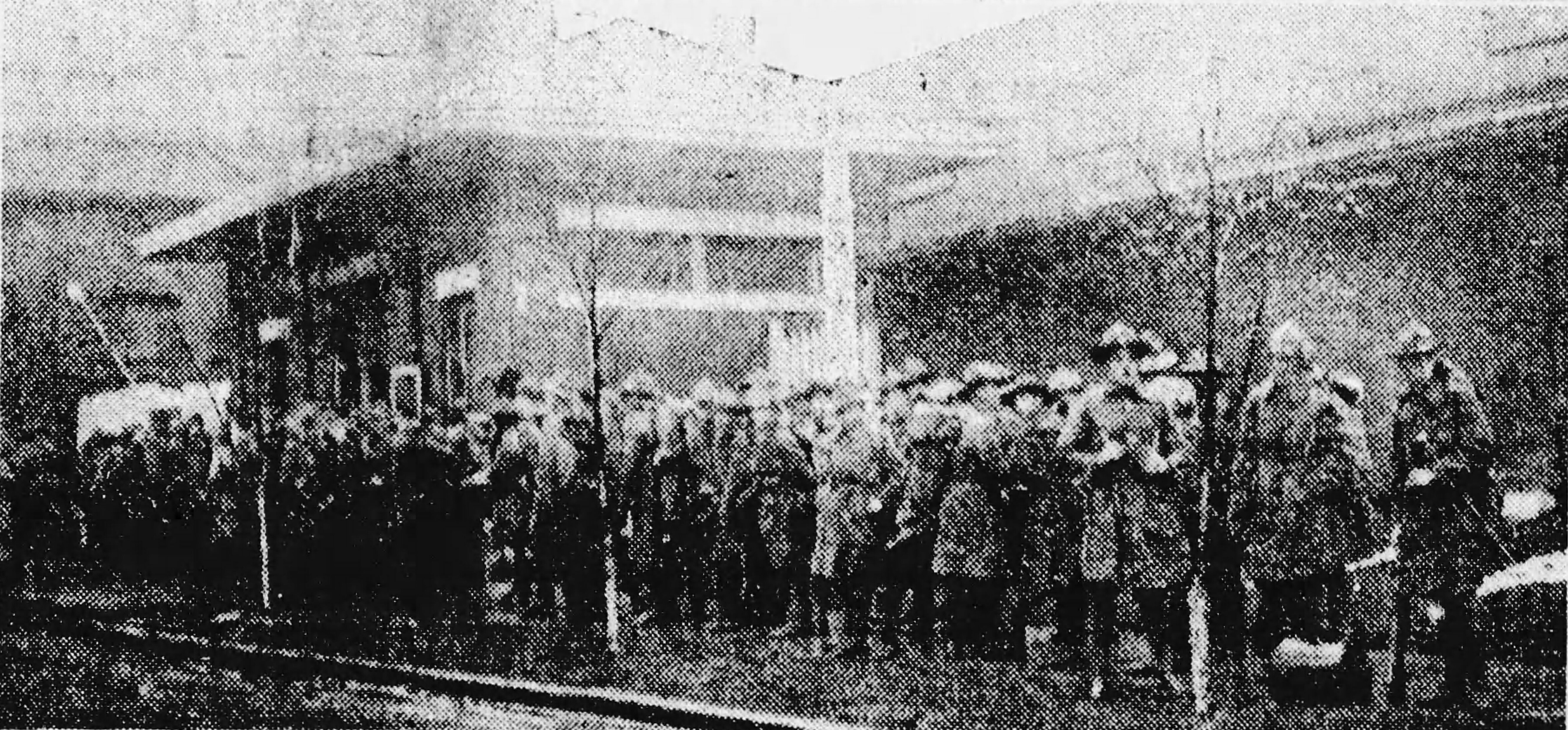
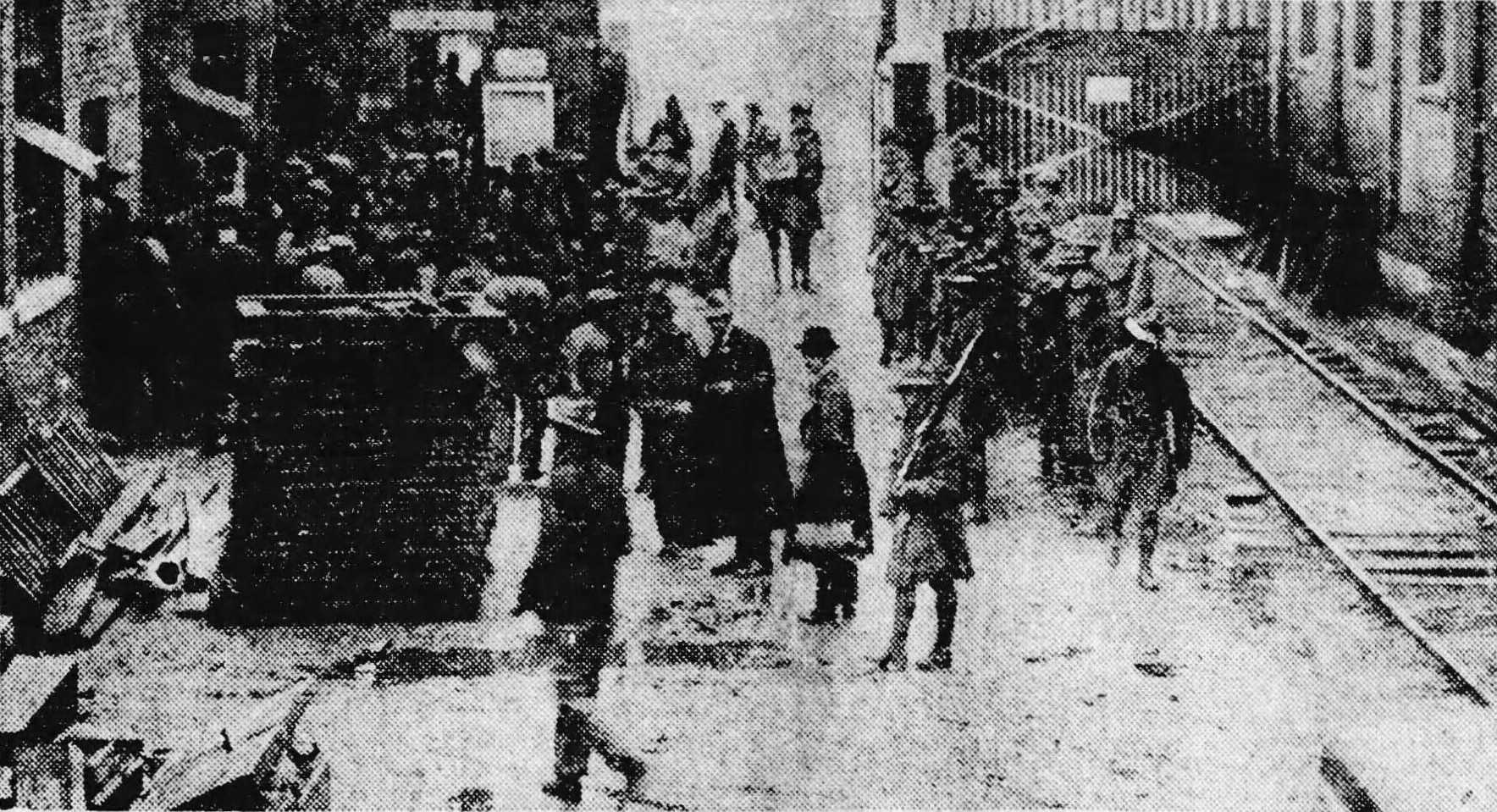
State Troops at the Newport Rolling mill

On the morning of December 24, 250 state troopers under the command of Col. H. H. Denhardt arrived in Newport, Kentucky.

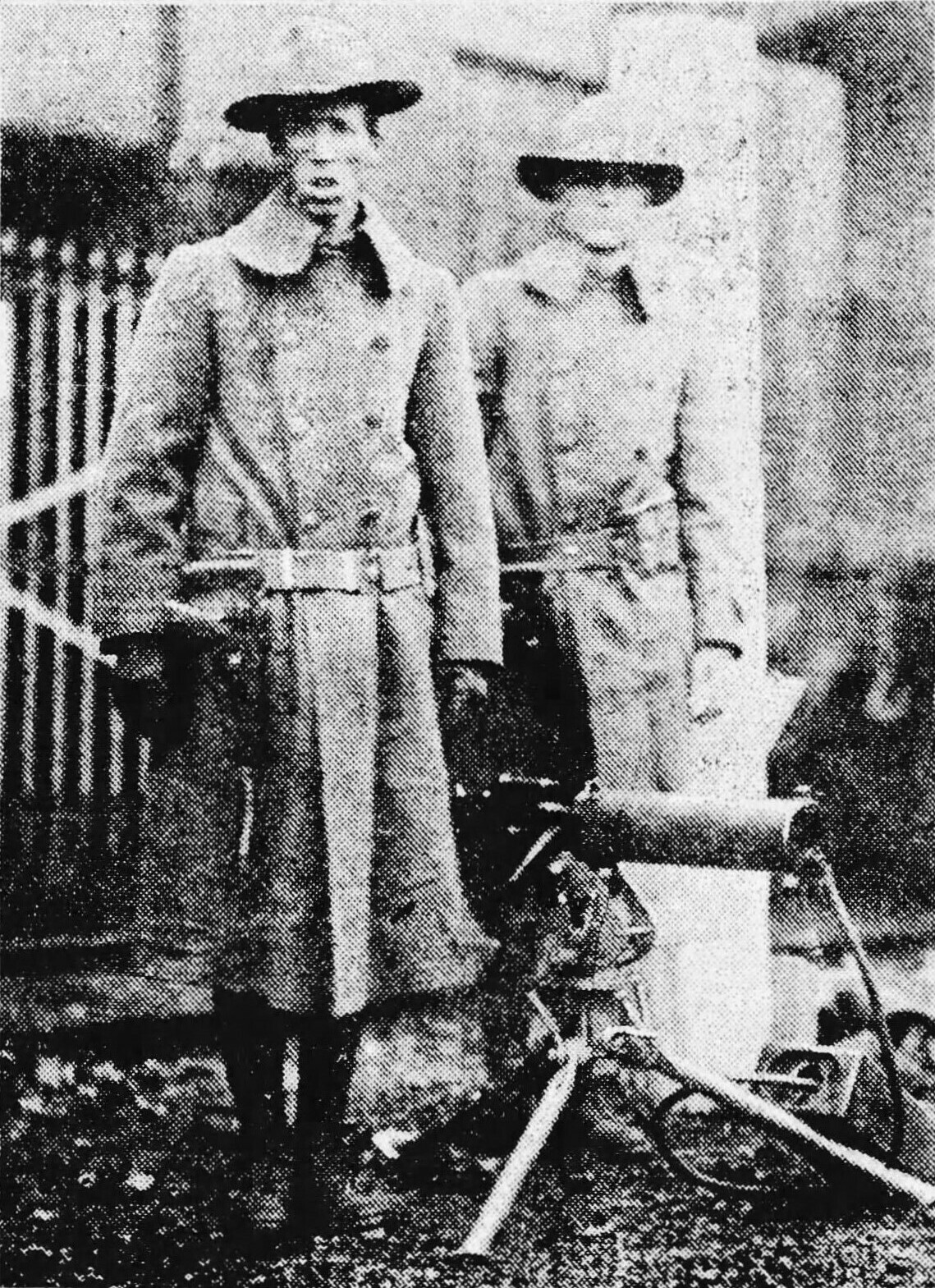

In the drizzling rain they marched to the mill, (Note: Starting at 12th & Monmouth St., to the Mill, 8 block march) men and children of the town jeered and cursed at them. While marching into the plant several shots fired out. In response troops stopped and set up a machine gun. After ten minutes of quiet, the gun was dismantled and taken into the plant.

At one point when troop officers neared the plant, a woman confronted the Adjutant General Jackson Morris with tears streaming down here face, she cried out:

"You have brought men and machine guns to kill us."

Morris paused the march and replied that were here not to shoot but protect them.

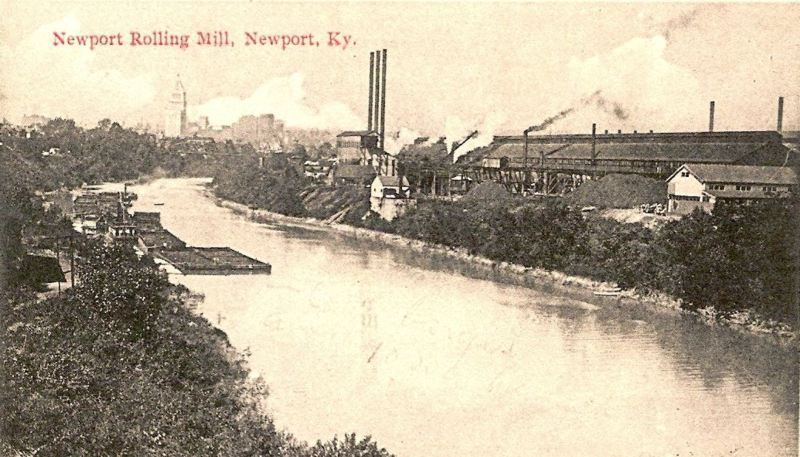
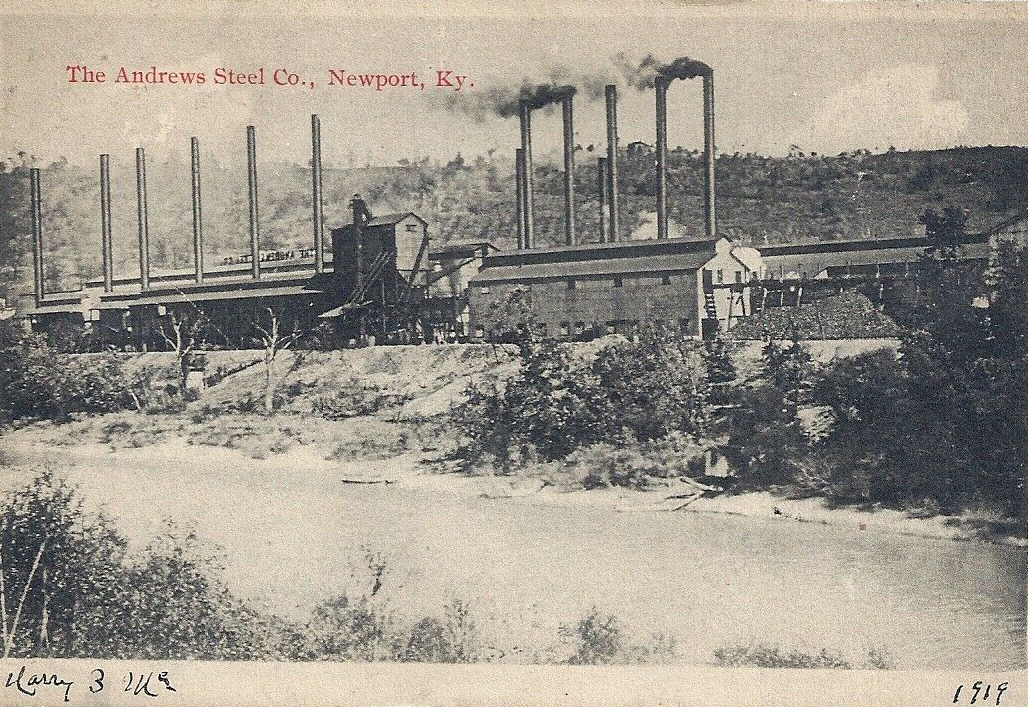

That evening, a militia member was accidentally killed by another soldier from an accidental discharge. Reportedly Charles Black fainted, falling into Robert Deaton, knocking Deaton's firearm from their holster. Which then hit the ground, discharging and killing Deaton.

The mills were shut down for two days due to the plant observing Christmas as a holiday. A conference between the union officers, Col. Denhardt, and Adjunct Morris was held on the Dec. 25. There Morris said they would permit two union men to be at the gates leading into the mill, changing shifts as often as they wanted and that they could gather in the huts nearby to the plant, since they were on private property. Morris lastly promised that there would be no more overnight 'bunking' at the plant by nonunion workers at the mill, instead leaving the mill everyday.

Strikers were also told by the military that everyone of the private armed guards in the mill had been sent out. Workers continued with pickets, having two on duty at all hours at the mill gate. Workers also had picket shanties along Brighton St., covering all connected streets that lead to the Newport Rolling Mill. Soldiers also patrolled (Note: From 4th to 11th) Brighton St.

Company owner W.N Andrews, announced he would be attending the conference by Rev. W. B. Harvey to attempt to settle the strike between the company and union. He cited the presence of troops for the company's decision to now accept the invitation. On December 27, union leaders and the company arranged for a public meeting the next day at the First Baptist Church, overseen by Rev. W. B. Harvey.

Rev. Harvey proposed eight propositions from which the two groups could negotiate around in the meeting. The union was receptive to it, saying if proposition 1, that the company will recognize and treat with the unions, was accepted the others were flexible. However the company's unwillingness to not have an open shop lead to a standstill in negotiations.

According to the Kentucky Post, Edward W. Miller president elect of Union Local 5. mentioned during a speech at the meeting that striking mill workers had seen the I.W.W since the start of trouble at the mill,

"During recent weeks considerable propaganda has been spread in Newport. Our pickets have come in contact with members of the I.W.W. These are the men spreading the propaganda."

— Edward W. Miller

Two more companies of troops arrived the night of December 28, for a total of 330 militia men in Newport. This was on the orders of Governor Morrow in response to updates he had received from Col. Dendhart about the town. Col. Dendhart announced that they were preparing for a long stay in Newport. On December 29, the guard lines around the Newport Rolling Mills were extended (northeast to York Street & onto all four bridges (Note: Two to Cincinnati: Central Bridge, L&N Bridge Two to Covington: 11th St. Bridge, 4th St. Bridge)) using the two new companies of militia that arrived the night before. Barracks were also being erected near the mill to house soldiers. Col. Denhardt said that in the event of taking complete control of the city, it would be designated a "Military Control Zone" instead of being under Martial Law as only federal authorities are allowed to do so. But, he noted, that there was no practical difference.

That day Gov. Morrow prepared to ask the state general assembly the authority to remove local police officers in Newport who he deemed were not doing their job. He also asked for them to give city authorities power to remove police judges and marshals. Alongside this, Morrow was expected to issue recommendations for Prohibition enforcement across the state.

Reported gunshots, Jan 1 to Feb 1, 1922 Yellow: shots at strikebreakers or militia Red: shots at strikers or citizens Red circle: barrages

Early in the morning on January 1, a firefight occurred between a large group on the Covington side of the Licking River and Newport Militia at the Rolling Mill. Its suspected that said group were likely striking workers and supporters.

On the night of New Year's Eve, the group had built a number of bonfires across the Covington bank. Then shortly before midnight they fired their rifles and revolvers into the air as a celebration of the new year. After they started yelling and singing. Then, after seeing a guard armed with a shotgun patrolling the Newport bank, taunts were shouted and one of the suspected strikers reportedly lowered their revolver, leveling it at the mill and fired. After which others in the group followed.

On the order of Col. Denhardt, militia men then trained a machine gun on the group, and opened fired. No one was reportedly hurt on either side of the conflict.

On January 3, Denhardt posted sentries along the Licking River banks. On January 4, Denhardt issued a statement to Newport citizens that he has told his troops to 'shoot to kill',

"Sympathizers have exhausted our patience and I have issued orders to my men to shoot to kill, if necessary, if they are attacked by a mob,"

The same day, Covington police were also stationed on their side of the river, reportedly in response to the conflict.

On January 5, company owner W. N. Andrews and Frank Benton, the company's attorney, were at Kentucky's capitol Frankfort to lobby against a troop investigation resolution. The resolution was proposed by Herman Q. Thompson of Newport, if passed it would provide seven members of the legislature and five senators to go to Newport, investigate and return. The Kentucky House voted to pass it, 55 to 33, after which it needed to be approved by the Senate. A day later W.N. Andrews would claim to be in support of the resolution's passage. Herman Q. Thompson stated a few days later on the topic,

"I notice press accounts of the visit said they were in favor of my resolution asking for an investigation. I want to say they do not favor my resolution, but they were there lobbying against it."

The investigation probe ended up dying in a committee vote on January 11, stopping it from reaching a senate vote.

On January 6, Kentucky Militia shot at two rowboats on the Licking river. According to Col. Denhardt, a white row boat first attempted to land near the plant which turned around after the mill searchlight was turned on it. Then sometime after two other dark rowboats attempted to land at which point guardsmen fired into the water with a machine gun. Denhardt claimed they shot at the rowboats because they believed it was IWW members trying to blow up the mill. That same night a mass meeting with 1,500 in attendance was held at the Temple Theater (Note: At 6th & Monmouth Streets) with city officials, Rev. E. R. Overlay, and Colonel Dennardt rallying support for a 'fight against vice'. In particular they noted safety commissioner, W. C. "Case" Thomasson as the leader of it, with one official (Note: Brent Spence, Newport City Solicitor) describing him as a crusader.

The next day, the vice president of the Amalgamated Association union, Walter Larkins was in the town attempting to help settle the dispute. A strike supporter, Kelly, was also found not guilty that day after being arrested by militia for refusing to 'move on'. Lieutenant Guy Tuttle testified he struck Kelly in the eye after being told by Colonel Denhardt to "not let him act that way." and then other testimony described the guardsmen grabbing Kelly, placing him in a truck and kneeling on him as group.

On January 9, a petition signed by 5,000 to 6,000 Newport citizens was presented to governor Morrow by representative Herman G. Thompson of Newport calling for the withdrawal of troops from the town. While on January 10, Herman Q. Thompson sent a telegram to Louis Tiemen the Campbell-co Newport Sheriff, informing them that Gov. Morrow would agree to withdraw troops if he would deputize men to take place of the troops, without deputy bond. Bond for police was money that had to be put up in order to be deputized, typically through a bondsmen, where if malpractice occurred their bondsmen could be sued. C. Thompson previously complained during the strike, "Policemen are called upon to make arrests and they do not know whether to make them or not for fear their bondsmen will be sued if the accused is dismissed." Sheriff Tiemen responded to the offer that he would not consider deputizing any men without bond.

A mass meeting of strikers and the general public was held at the Temple Theater on 8 pm January 11. Both Amalgamated Association's national union president Michael. F Tighe and vice president Walter Larkin who had arrived at Newport that day, were present at the meeting. City officials were also in attendance, and company officials were invited, but did not attend. They called for the removal of troops and also settling of the strike with union recognition. In a letter released the day before by the union they stated, "The question of principle that is involved - the surrendering of our rights to be members of the Amalgamated Associations - cannot be arbitrated, and we reaffirm our stand on the signing of any agreement that might be negotiated or arrived at by collective bargaining."

On January 13, two more militia companies arrived in Newport at the order of Gov. Morrow, numbering around 100 extra men, in total around 400 in the city. Both Sheriff Tieman and Mayor Joseph Hermann criticized this decision. Mayor Hermann on the event said,

"...As there has never been any need of state troops in our city, and I think they are the real menace toward the peace of our community, I am not in accord with the using of our police force in connection with your state troops..."

That day the Kentucky Legislature also was debating a bill to require phone companies give a list of all unlisted phone numbers to police. The Kentucky Post wrote there had been considerable bickering about the phone situation in Newport, and Judge Manson, who drafted the bill, argued "The only complaint against the measure will come from the lawless element who now hide behind the unlisted phone."

According to the Industrial Worker, reporting on January 14, in response to the constant firing strikers had constructed blockhouses near their pickets and coated them with sheet iron to protect them from stray bullets. In addition the paper reported strikebreakers were largely being driven in from nearby Cincinnati.

On January 14, Col. Denhardt returned to Newport after being away at their hometown, Bowling Green. Two days later The Kentucky Post called for Governor Morrow, in the face of his announced personal visit to Newport, to force state arbitration of the strike. The next day, Gov. Morrow arrived in Newport and held a closed session at the courthouse with union officials, company officials, and three representatives of the public in hopes of resolving the strike. Those three representatives being Milton Marx a Monmouth-St merchant, Reverend E. R. Overley and Reverend M. J. Lieck. Morrow said should no settlement be reached that day, he would return 2 days later, since he had to be in Frankfort on the 18th. No settlement occurred and neither side was in favor of arbitration. During this union official Tighe said to Morrow, that if the company recognized the union the strike could be settled in minutes. The meeting on January 19 also did not settle the strike.

During this time a judicial fight over court appointments occurred involving Judge Butten of the Campbell County Court attempting to oust Fritz Kraft's reappointment to superintendent of the Campbell-Co infirmary (and poorhouse) in favor of William Silversack. Judge Butten would later be targeted by a prohibition raid from militia a few months later, which had been speculated to be due to their support of the strike and opposition to militia presence. No alcohol would be found and charges would later be dropped. That same day a strike relief organization, the Woman's Volunteer Relief Committee of Campbell County, was formed by 35 Newport women. A card party was planned for February 27 & 28, for the benefit of the striking mill workers. Colonel Denhardt also drew in his guard lines back in, shrinking the strike zone, citing the 'quiet conditions'.

On January 21, US District Judge A.M.J. Cochran made a permanent order to enjoin strikers from interfering with interstate company shipments. It also gave companies the ability to in-debt any costs from interference onto the defendant strikers.

On January 25, Gov. Morrow publicly announced plans to withdraw all militia on Saturday, January 28. A significant portion had already left by this announcement, with around 150 militia men left in the city. Additional special deputies would also be appointed by Sherriff Tieman and safety director W. Case Thomasson, in preparation for and following the troop removal. In response to decision, the Newport Rolling Mill announced it was going to reorganize its charter under Delaware laws within 30 days, in order to call for Delaware to send in troops to Newport, Kentucky. It was further detailed by the town that police would be put on 12 hour shifts following the troops removal. While the removal itself would see half leave the morning of Saturday, January 28 and the other half in the night.

==== Militia leaves ====
On January 28, an uninvolved driving car was reportedly stoned, by those who believed it contained strikebreakers. Around midnight January 29, a firefight occurred. Joseph Hicinbothem, a strikebreaker, had fired shots from his home (Note: At 508 Hodge St.) into the homes of union men. After which his house was hit with rocks and shot at, following which he fled to the Newport jail for protection. Of the situation Hicinbothem, said he fired "his share of the shots." People reportedly then broke into the house, by the end windows were broken and furniture ended up smashed. At some point a fire started, with the fireman saying that a gas stove had been knocked over causing the gas to ignite. Reportedly while firemen were fighting the blaze, someone in the crowd cut the fire hose. That night Gov. Morrow was in Newport at the Gibson Hotel, for a conference in an effort to settle the strike. He would not comment on the conflict. Company owner W. N Andrews, who was also at the conference, similarly refused to comment on the event.

A meeting held (Note: At J.J Radel Funeral Chapel) on January 30, planned to be between the Women's Auxiliary of the Amalgamated Association of Iron, Steel and Tin Workers, and W.N. Andrews alongside company officials to discuss the strike. W.N. Andrew ended up not showing to the meeting, saying he was unable to under current conditions. That night, Ben Colker, a mill clerk, shot at a crowd of strikers (Note: At 9th and Brighton St.) while police were trying to scatter the assembly. Ben Colker told police that he fired shots after being attacked by several men.

On January 31, at 2 am, machine guns at the Rolling Mill were heard firing into the nearby neighborhood's homes. A striking millworker, Frank "Pete" Meyer ended up being shot in the shoulder from it while walking along Brighton St. near its 7th St. intersection. A firefight occurred later in the day. Reportedly, special deputy sheriff's were chasing after two men, that they saw stone a company truck on Ann street. While they were on Central Ave, a guard on a company truck (Note: At 9th and Central Ave.) fired the first shot. After which special deputy sheriffs opened fire on a crowd, and shots were fired at the deputies from a house and people on the streets. Twelve special deputies resigned early the next day, following the firefight. A meeting between a delegation of the Women's Union Auxiliary and company president A.K. Andrews at 3pm at their office was also held, after company owner W.N. Andrew's failure to appear the day before. They reported after at the Music Hall to the Auxiliary, stating that no progress towards a strike settlement was made.

A report was filed to Covington police claiming snipers had fired into the mill early in the morning of February 1, however no trace of them were found by police.

That night, machine guns at the Rolling Mill were fired into homes, from 11pm to 4am. Accounts by citizens and Sheriff Tieman mention mill guards doing so unprovoked. Any who attempted to leave their homes were reportedly shot at. Many citizens fled to their cellars or behind makeshift barricades for safety. Citizens estimated more than 1,000 bullets were shot. The company denied any shots were fired by guards except two at a man who came inside the mill enclosure. Many homes ended being severely damaged, which one reporter upon seeing them described as "shot to pieces".

Rumors spread that I.W.W agitators were in the town. In a letter by safety commissioner W Case Thomasson appealing to Gov. Morrow he stated an anonymous source had told him that night that "I.W.W agitators are in city, and have information that 15 gunmen are in city."

On the possibility of troops being sent back; Jackson Morris, Adjutant General of Kentucky, said "I have received no orders to send states troops to Newport as yet." While Gov. Morrow said "I am not responsible for reports that state troops have been ordered back to Newport." At the time Morrow was in communication with several Newport organizations asking around the subject of sending troops. When talking over the phone to the Cincinnati Times-Star and asked about troops, Morrow refused to discuss it, saying "I am not ready to make any announcement."

=== Tanks arrive ===
On the evening of February 2, on the order of Gov. Morrow; The Covington Tank Corps, commanded by Captain L. V. Crocket, moved without notice into the Newport mill zone with five tanks, equipped with machine guns and one pound rapid fire guns.

Reported gunshots following tank arrival, 1922 Yellow: shots at strikebreakers or militia Red: shots at strikers or citizens Red circle: barrages

A crowd of strikers and strike supporters, already present in the area, grew and became angry once the tanks arrived following an initial arrival of troops on trucks, consisting of 60 men. The crowd, around 1,000 people, marched to Case Thomasson's home, the safety commissioner, demanding he order for the tanks to be removed from around the mills. Then they marched to Newport City Hall, where Thomasson addressed the crowd.

Both Thomasson and Newport's mayor, Joseph Hermann, attempted to persuade and stop the crowd's march. They were unsuccessful. The crowd also jeered Thomasson, claiming he sent a telegram urging the return of troops, which he denied. When the crowd arrived at the mill, Thomasson appealed to Captain Crocket to remove them, which he refused, continuing to draw his tanks closer to the mills.

At approximately midnight, a shot rung out. Immediately after, the mill let out the rattle of machine gun fire, shooting into the neighborhood, hitting the George King saloon and through 9th & Brighton streets. Civilians and the Newport police patrol ducked behind buildings to protect themselves.

After this, the firefighting continued into the next morning before dawn, machine gun and mill riot shotguns bullets tore through nearby houses. Private mill guards hired by the company also operated the machine guns. Militia men were protected by steel shields. Houses as far as eight blocks away from the mill were hit by bullets. The shooting continued from 12 am to 2 am. Of the situation, Captain Crocket said they were sure several men must have been wounded in the crowd during it.

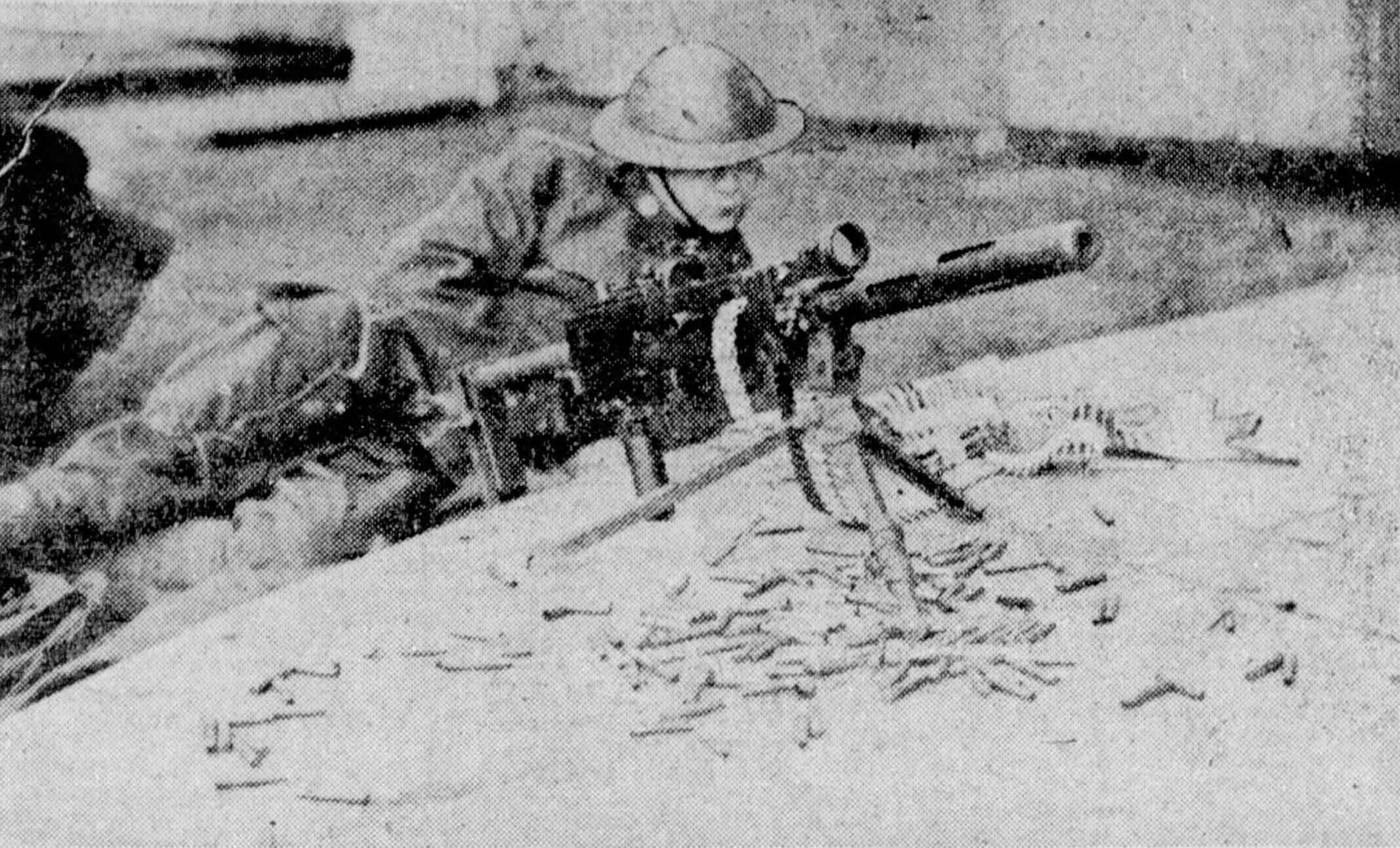
Newport Rolling Mill,
Pub. Feb 3, 1922

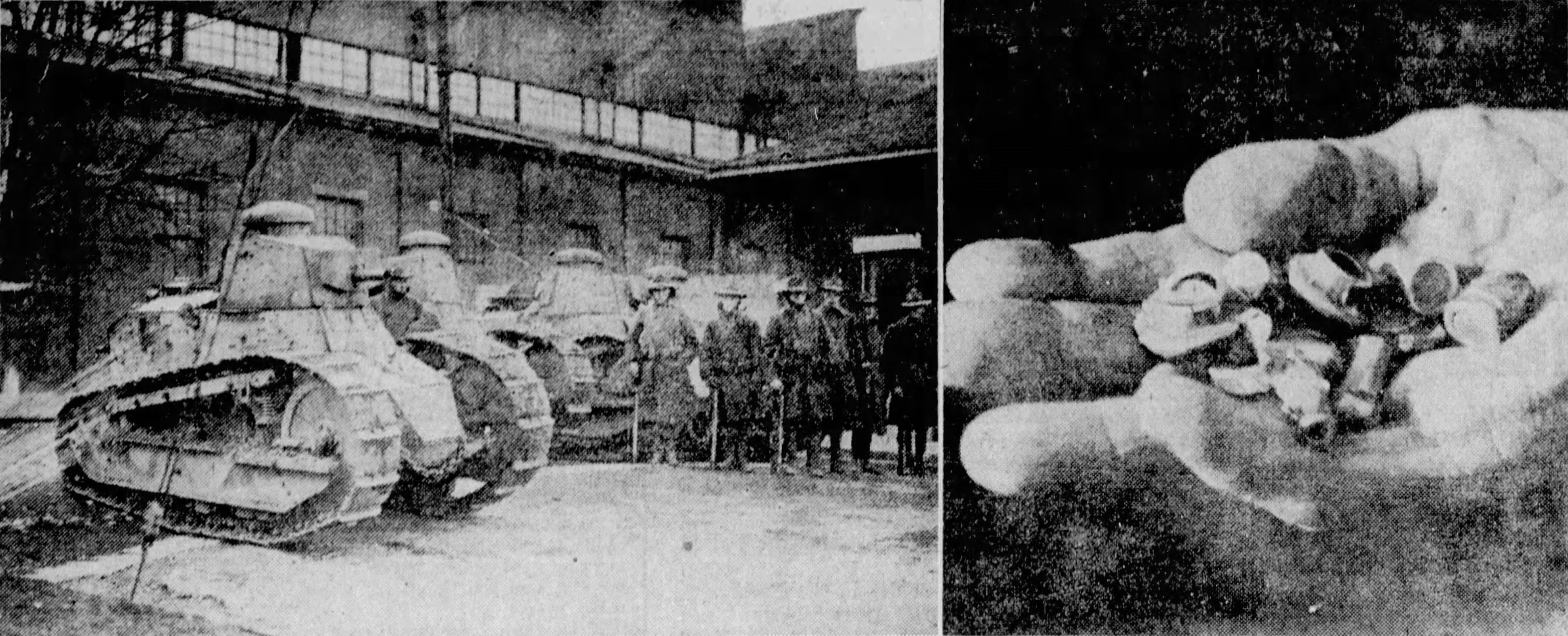
Tanks at Newport Rolling Mill & bullet shells;
Pub. February 4, 1922

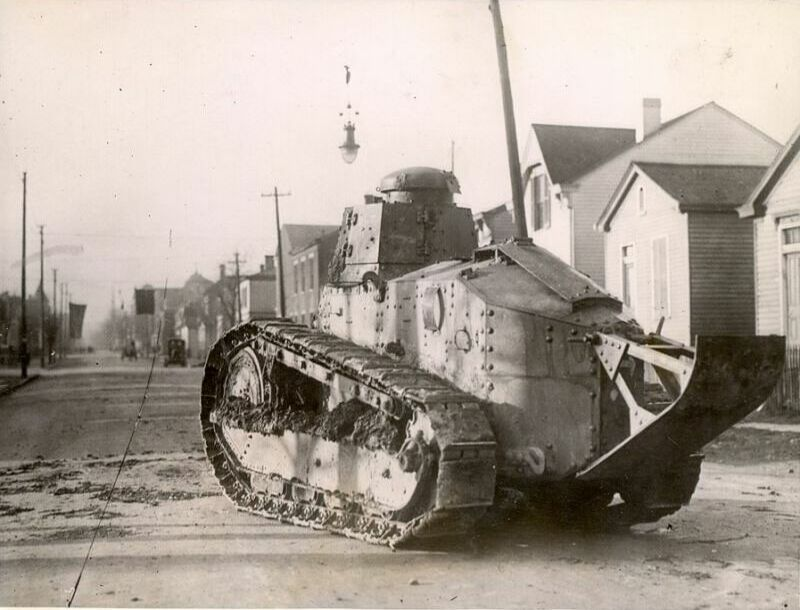
Tank on Brighton St,
Pub. Feb 3, 1922

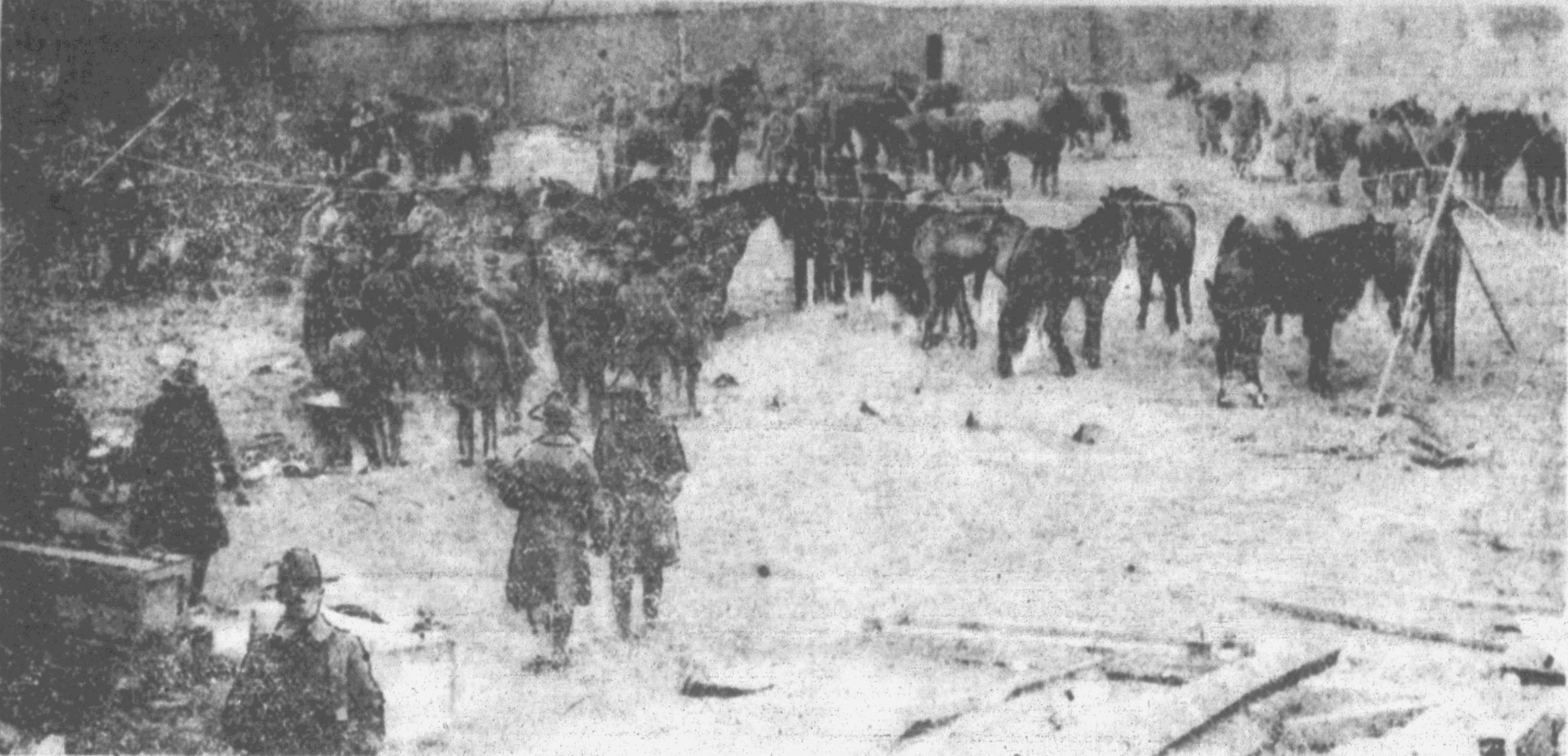
Militia Cavalry, Pub. Feb 4, 1922

February 2–3, Reported timeline by The Kentucky Post
- 6:45 pm: Crowd of strikers and strike sympathizers, swelled by threescore deputy sheriffs and police, surprised when two truck loads of soldiers arrive.
- 7:00 pm: Rumor has it troops are a detail of regulars from Ft. Thomas.
- 7:15 pm: Soldiers identified as tank crew from Covington.
- 7:50 pm: Crowd grows larger.
- 8:05 pm: Slowly moving baby tanks appear, with dangerous looking one-pounders protruding. Crowd becomes angry.
- 8:30 pm: "Go get Case Thomasson!" is the cry. "Make him come down here and order the tanks taken away." someone suggests.
- 8:45 pm: Crowd forms and march to City Hall is started.
- 8:57 pm: Reporter on duty at City Hall told mob is after him. He leaves.
- 9:00 pm: Crowd fails to find Thomasson at office and continues march to his home.
- 9:15 pm: Thomasson routed out of bed and goes to City Hall, where he addresses crowd. Strikers and strike sympathizers join in the speechmaking.
- 10:00 pm: Crowd returns to Ninth and Brighton.
- 10:15 pm: Mayor Joseph Hermann arrives and addresses the crowd, counseling them to keep order and promises that the tanks will be taken away in the morning.
- 10:50 pm: Case Thomasson with a detail of police, reached Ninth and Brighton in the police patrol, which is parked at intersection of street.
- 10:55 pm: Crowd jeers Thomasson as he attempts to speak, and he denies he sent a telegram asking for return of troops.
- 11:30 pm: Thomasson continues to talk with the strikers and sympathizers.
- 12:02 am: First shot of the night rings out.
- 12:02 am: Patrol, which is in range of guns at the mill, hurriedly backs up Brighton-st behind a brick building.
- 12:05 am: Thomasson and a policeman approach soldier picket line to investigate.
- 12:06 am: Second shot fired.
- 12:07 am: Guns at mills let loose first volley. Police on duty at Ninth and Brighton keep crowd back out of range. Bullets patter against brick wall of George King's saloon.
- 12:08 am: Sheriff L. B. Tieman. with squad, goes to the soldiers' line, where they are stopped.
- 12:10 am: Thomasson returns and, mounting the patrol, tells the crowd that the soldiers had reported the first shot had been fired from without the mill. Crowd jeers him.
- 12:15 am: Thomasson leaves scene in patrol wagon, while crowd hoots and jeers. Someone in the crowd fired a shot in the air.
- 12:16 am: Shot is answered by a volley from the direction of the mill, King's place being the target.
- 12:20 am: Sheriff Tieman returns, and members of the crowd take him to the side of the building to show him where the bullets are hitting.
- 12:21 am: Sheriff needs no further proof, as another volley is turned loose and bullets hit all about him.
- 12:25 am: Sheriff assures crowd. he'll try to stop the shooting, and retires up the street to use telephone to those inside the mill
- 12:40 am: Gun battle opens in earnest. Each shot from outside the mill is answered by a volley.
- 1:01 am: Machine guns rip thru frame houses facing on Brighton-st. Women and children heard screaming, while men fall to the ground and floor for safety.
- 1:15 am: Women and children flee from the frame houses in the vicinity of King's saloon as bullets entering the rear of the houses had gone clear thru the building, falling on the streets.
- 2:00 am: Shooting continues, with volley apparently being turned toward the river bank.
- 2:10 am: Crowd becomes small and shooting gradually dies out.
- 6:00 am: Small crowd gathers at Ninth and Brighton streets.
- 6:30 am: Tank is moved from the mill to Ninth and Brighton streets. Five policemen and others are ordered to move. Tank crew fires several shots.
- 7:00 am: Residents who had snatched a few hours' sleep after the battle begin survey of the damage, broken windows and damaged furniture being objects of [unreadable].

During the firefight, Melvin Larkin of the Covington Tank Corps was wounded in the cheek by a buckshot, reportedly from a shotgun in the hands of a sniper, according to Larkin. After being wounded he replied twice with a riot gun. Larkin's wounds were reported as not serious.

Around dawn when Sergeant Edward Kearns and a patrol arrived in the mill zone, while walking closer to the mills were fired on (Note: At 9th & Patterson St.) by a tank gunner farther down the street, they took cover at which point the firing stopped. Then later as police reached closer they were fired on again. Kearns hailed the gunner informing them they were police, in response the gunner said, "Keep away from here. My orders are to shoot to kill at police or anybody else who comes around." Captain Crockett denied giving those orders, saying he only ordered them to reply to fire and get snipers when possible. He then charged "Certain police are trying to discredit the troops of my command,".

That day, Morrow issued a statement to the 'people of Newport' "to stand up and be counted for the law of the land" and that troops would remain indefinitely until order was restored. In it he also stated,

"I am sending the National Guard troops of the commonwealth of Kentucky to put an end to this condition. Any one who fires on, strikes or insults a state trooper fires on, strikes and insults Kentucky, and they will be treated accordingly."

— Gov. Morrow

After a meeting between Captain Crockett and school superintendent E. F. Sporing, it was announced that students attending Tenth Street School (Note: At 10th & Patterson St.) would be dismissed for the time being as a precautionary measure, affecting 200 students.

Twelve further detachments, of Kentucky state guardsmen consisting of around 350 soldiers, were under orders Feb 3 to move into Newport. They would temporarily be under the command of Major Isaac Wilder for the day until Colonel Denhardt, who previously commanded the militia in the city, returned. Forty horses also arrived in the city that morning for militia cavalrymen. Colonel Charles Morrow, the twin brother of Gov. Morrow, would also be overseeing in an advisory capacity. A rumor was heard that night that at least 3 men had been injured that morning when a squad of soldier fired at a crowd after shots were heard, however it wasn't confirmed.

One hundred citizens of Ft. Thomas were also specially deputized that day to guard the homes of Newport Rolling Company officials. Each was given at least on revolver and were set to patrol the surrounding streets. A man was arrested on Feb 3 by militia, for peering into or looking into the stables that housed the Calvary horses. He was going to be tried by a military court organized by Col. Denhardt.

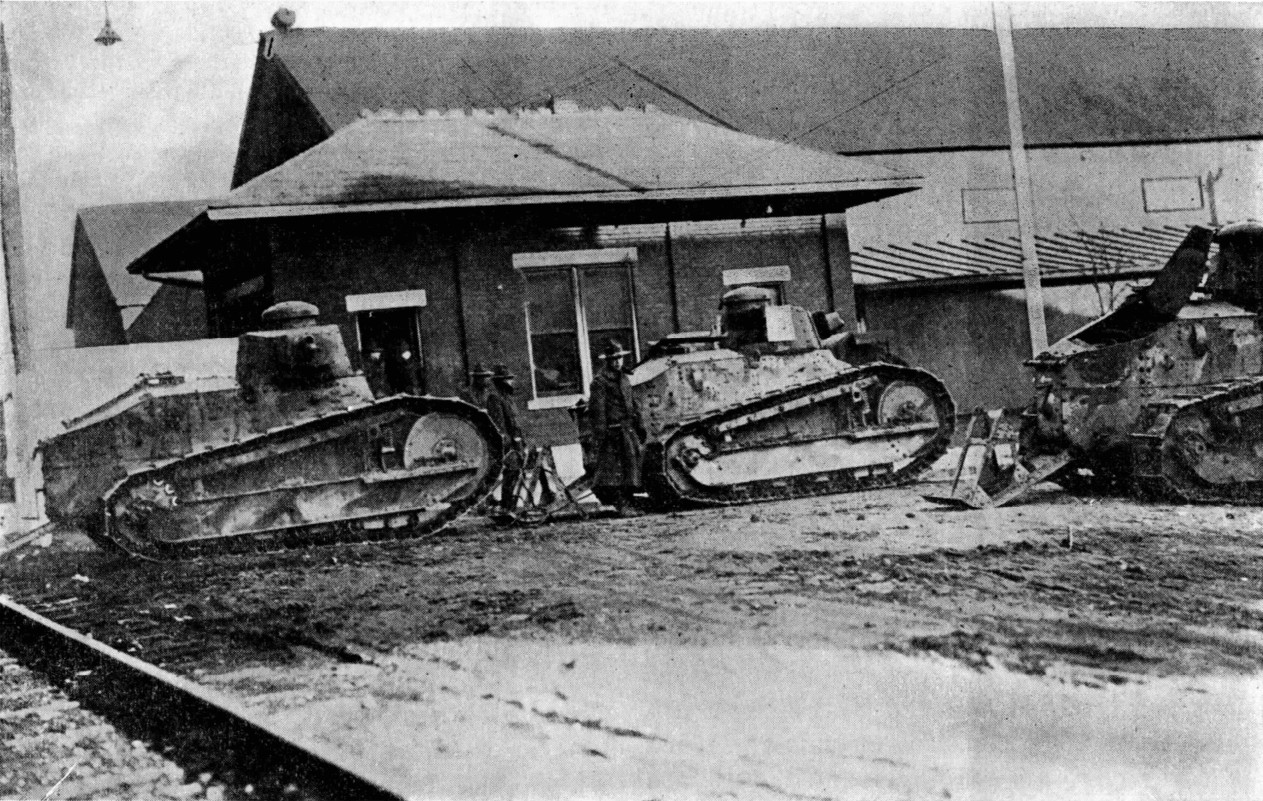
Tanks at Newport Rolling Mill, Pub. March 1922 in monthly Labor Age

On February 4 Fred Sloan, a member of the union (AA), gave a speech at Music Hall (Note: at 11th & York street) to a large crowd urging that petitions be circulated calling upon Gov. Morrow to order troops to stop escorting non-union workers in & out of the mill, and to also have it so strikebreakers are no longer housed inside the plant. He reiterated that the strike was over union recognition, not wages. Mrs. Adolph Schott gave an address at the Hall, criticizing Gov. Morrow, Newport Business, Thomasson, Tieman, Rev E.R. Overley, and Milton Marx for their support of or role in the re-sending of troop to Newport.

The same day Governor Morrow arrived in Cincinnati to confer with a select delegation of Newport citizens, cancelling a speaking engagement he had planned at Louisville in order to do so. Col. Denhardt stated their intent to patrol the entire city and root out "IWW Agitators". Cavalrymen (Note: Under the command of Captain Colin of Springfield, Captain Eversole of London, and Captain Norman of Frankfort) would be assigned to the outer sections of the city, while the infantry and tanks would be kept in the immediate area around and in the mill. On picketing, Col. Denhardt said, "We may permit two pickets at each of the three entrances to the mill, but even this will not be permitted unless there is quiet".

On February 4, Col Denhardt announced that night their intent to put the city under military rule. Denhardt announced,

We are going to patrol all of Newport, and we mean business this time. There will be no soft pedaling... Citizens who have no business in the strike zone must keep on the move. We will disburse anything that looks like a threatening crowd and will ask questions afterwards, whether they be on the streets or on private property."

Around 450-500 soldiers were stationed in the city, in total. Reportedly, this made it the largest assembly of militia men ordered to one point for active duty in Kentucky, up to that point in history. As a show of force, Colonel Denhardt stage a parade of the militia, tanks and cavalry that night through the city. Following this the largest amount of fighting occurred between the militia and Newport citizens up to this point during the strike, which continued into the next day, February 5.

The evening of February 4, four strikebreakers were reportedly attacked by a mob of strikers, after which militia arrived, shot into the crowd and then charged them with clubbed rifles. Another account of the event mentions the conflict beginning as a result of troops attempting to disperse a crowd of 600 at 9th & Brighton, opposite the mill entrance, trying force the picketers behind a "dead line", initially clubbing them with their rifles when they refused and then shooting. At least 10 people were shot or otherwise injured. Herman Q Thompson also sent a telegram to President Harding that night,

"Governor Morrow has sent troops to our town, shooting and killing men and women. Please act."

Campbell County Judge William C. Buten, sent a letter of protest to Governor Morrow following the shooting criticizing the sending of tank troops & actions of those in charge of troops generally. Writing also, "Your letter, however convinces me that the information upon which you relied grossly misrepresented and exaggerated conditions here..." He further continued when discussing the use of tanks:

"At best they can never be more than instruments of slaughter on a battlefield, and used on the streets of a city do more damage to the innocent and helpless than in stopping disorder."

A few days after, on February 10, Judge Buten sent this letter criticizing the use of tank troops, he was arrested and charged by the militia on conspiracy to violate the prohibition law. He was raided while in a cafe for a loan signature, no liquor was found but he was still charged.

| Person | Injuries |
|---|---|
| W.B. Comstock | scalp, and gunshot wounds |
| Herschell Wolf | bullet wounds and possible internal injuries |
| Mrs. Gertrude Ossege | knocked unconscious when struck with the butt end of a rifle |
| Frank Jansen | shot in hip |
| Thomas Carroll | gunshot wound in the left arm |
| Keller Van Hook | beaten on body with rocks and fists |
| James Groves | injured when struck with rocks and fists |
| C. B. Brown | injured when struck with rocks and fists |
| Joseph Gillespie | cut on head and ear torn |
| Edward King | slightly injured & beaten by guards while jailed |
| Joseph Case | slightly injured |
| Fred Kelly | slightly injured |
| Erbig Erdmann | Reportedly in firefight with tank, shot in right leg |
| Joseph Schneider | Reportedly in firefight with tank, shot in hip |
| Charles Hafel | Deep wound in head |
| Taylor Brooks (striker) | Stabbed in the back |
| Charles Fischer | Reportedly thrown out of second story window (20 feet) by militiamen |

From February 4 to 5, in total at least seventeen people were injured during firefights and conflicts. Frank Jansen, one of those injured by the militia, charged the attack as unprovoked. After being ordered to go into their houses, Jansen moved to go across the street to his house, as he was at a friends. After which two shoots were taken at him, one which hit him, in the hip. The incident was verified through evidence of the first bullets hole in the house next door. Colonel Denhardt denied the claim that it was unprovoked, claiming Jansen had fired on the troopers. No weapon was found on Jansen. Reportedly Sunday morning, two firefights occurred between the armored tank and cars, during which two men were wounded. The two men shot upon claimed they were fired at unprovoked.

During this period, the soup kitchen run by the strikers was shut down by the militia.

Governor Morrow third attempt to settle the strike that weekend had failed, and he left Monday for Frankfort, Ky.

On February 6, Col. Denhardt defended the actions of his troops on February 4,

"...for these officials, who are now complain of the action of myself and my men connected with the dispersing of the mob by fire last Saturday, I would have doubted our being right. But on behalf of myself and my men I wish to say that we regard their disapproval of our acts as a badge of honor, a complete vindication of what we did."

Mayor Joseph Hermann heavily criticized the actions of the troops, "Newport is under Prussian rule. Women and children and old men were treated more kindly by invading Germans than by the soldiers who invaded peaceful sections of Newport Saturday." Criticizing the troops presence within the city, City Mayor Herman also said of the city:

“Tho martial law has not been declared, the condition practically exists with the exception that no effort has been made to take over the City Building and the Courthouse.”

Commenting on the night before, Colonel Denhardt declared,“We intend to show the people of Newport that we are in charge."

Zone Covered By Military In Taking Over Newport
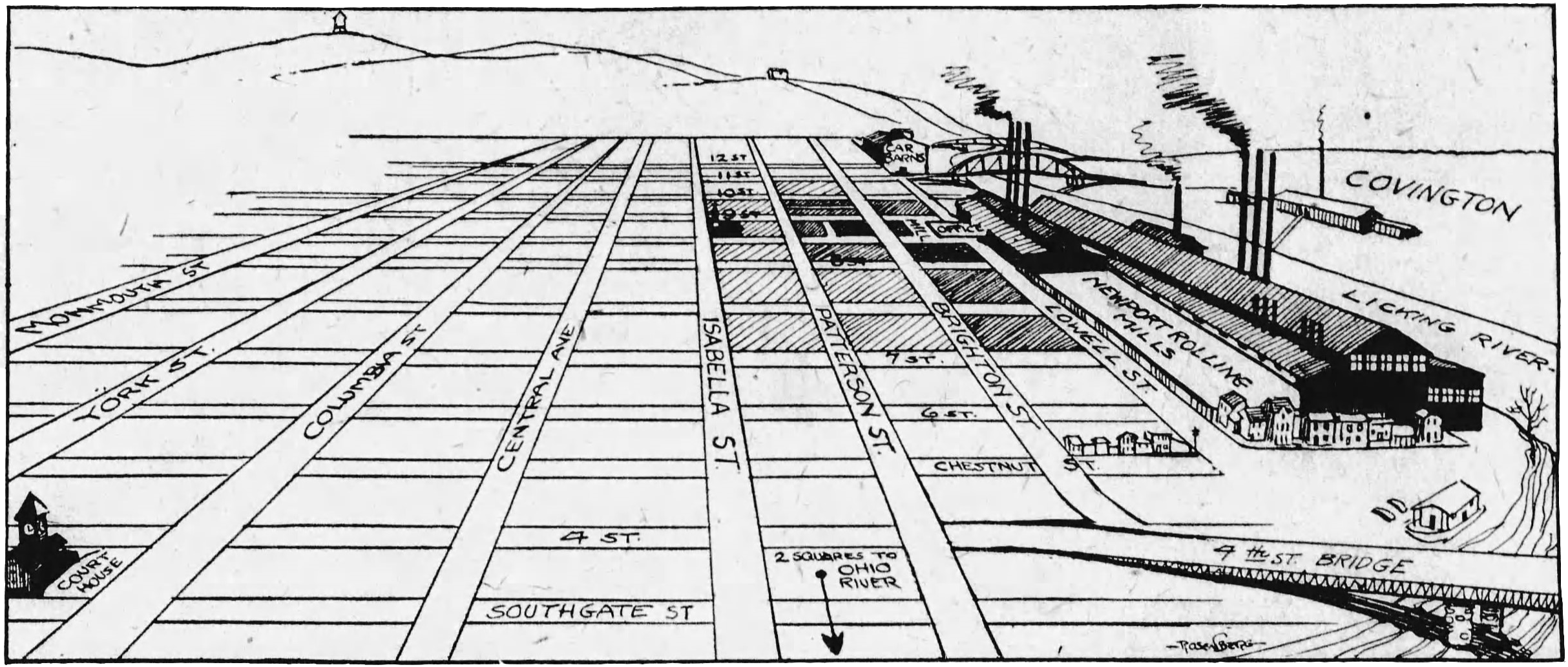
The Kentucky Post; February 7, 1922

On February 7, Mayor Hermann was in Frankfort to bring complaints by residents of Newport of the harm caused by the militia to call for their withdrawal.

On February 8, the woman's auxiliary of Amalgamated Association Iron, Steel and Tinworkers met to organize more member and draft a group letter to be sent to Congressman Arthur B. Rouse condemning the sending of state guards,

"Martial law has been thrust upon them by the capitalists, sympathizers and the most unjust accusations flung in their faces by the paid press. You can and you must help for the mothers, wives and children sake, Money is not the question in their demand, just recognition of their union. Must they stand for the insults thrust upon them? Cannot our country, for whom so many of her boys shed their blood.."

==== Crackdown and raids ====
On February 9, the militia ordered striking workers out of their labor hall, saying they were no longer allowed to meet there. Six picket workers were also arrested by the militia on suspicion of violating alcohol prohibition laws. That same day the Newport Lodge No. 510 Loyal Order of Moose, criticized the national Guard for, "[the] tyrannical exercise of the spirit and power of military despotism" and to end the "mistreatment, intimidation, abuse and arrest of citizens, without warrants,".

On February 10, Louis Dreyling was arrested for picketing the home of John Siervet, a strikebreaker, Dreyling was reportedly carrying a club in their hand alongside another man who evaded arrest by the militia. The union's central committee also sent a letter to Colonel Denhardt accusing militia members of stealing the worker's relief funds at a cafe on February 4.

See What the Soldiers Brought In
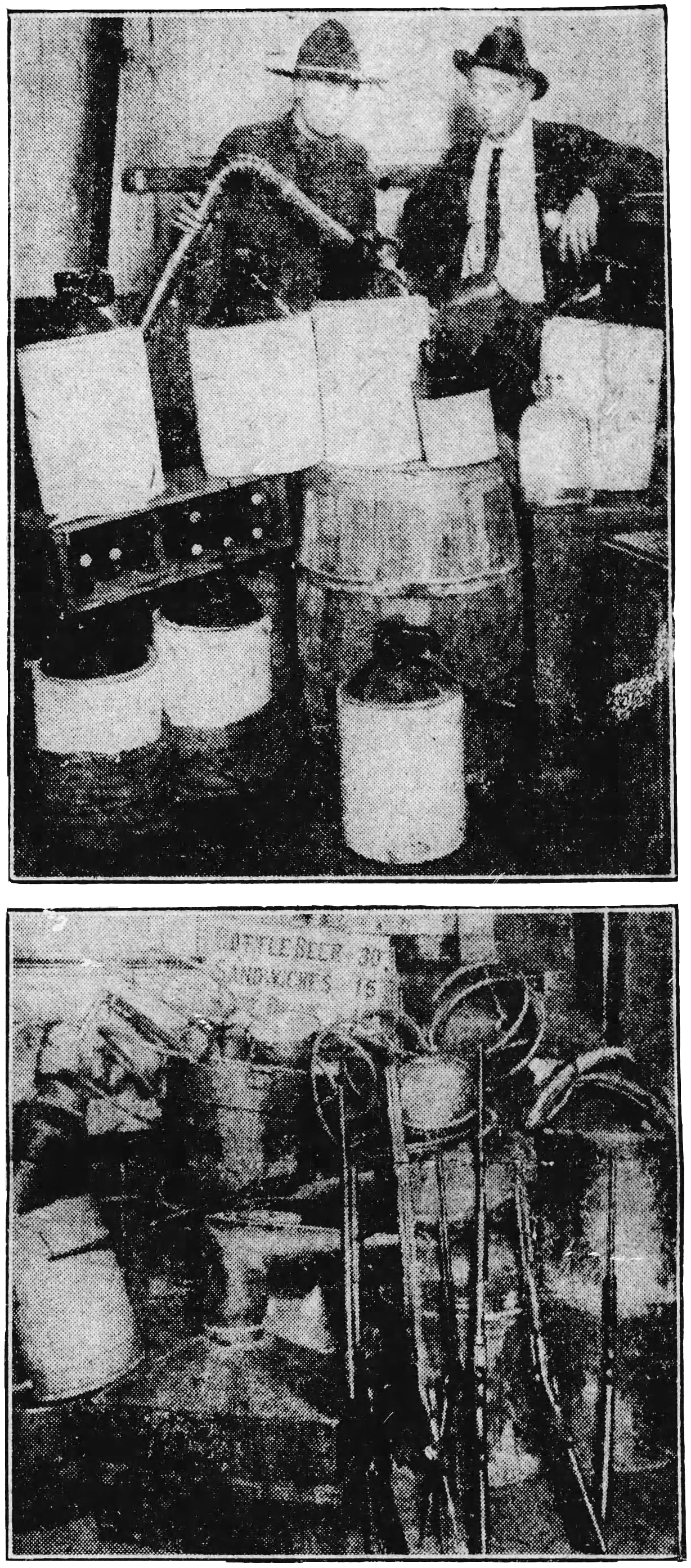
The Kentucky Post, February 11, 1922

That afternoon, Militiaman Farrar O. Elliston of the tank corps was critically wounded by an accidental fire of his revolver as he was attempting to unload it while going off duty. The bullet entered his upper left side, went through his stomach and then exited through his right side.

That same day, a large series of simultaneous raids were made in Newport by the national militia and federal prohibition officers. In total 30 saloons were raided, At least 38 persons arrested. Eleven' stills reportedly uncovered, Truck and cars with liquor captured, firearms confiscated, and gambling machines.

Patrolmen Charles Hamilton was arrested by militia for a failure to report prohibition violations. Herman Q. Thompson, Newport representative in the state legislature was hit by conspiracy charges by militia, Colonel Denhardt had publicly accused and placed blame on Thompson for the violence on February 4 & 5. One of the four union local's presidents also had been hit with conspiracy charges with a warrant out for an arrest. Judge Buten was also among the arrested on conspiracy charges. All had previously been critical of militia's presence in the town.

The militia troops also patrolled all bridges and roads leading out of Newport, stopping and search all cars and trucks to look for alcohol.

During these raids a firefight also reportedly broke out, according to the Kentucky Post,

"Louis Cook, Ft. Thomas police chief, and Amos Ross, Ft. Thomas soldier, engaged in a pitched a battle with men on a truck believed to have contained whisky at Ft. Thomas and Highland avenues, Ft. Thomas. The truck, with many bullet holes in it, it was found abandoned on the Alexandria-pike later by citizens who took up the chase. It was said to have been stolen from a Covington fruit dealer. One bullet fired by the men in the truck smashed the windshield of Cook's auto, and the officer was slightly cut by glass."

On February 16, the Kentucky National Guard surrounded the Newport Courthouse, to arrest six public officials: Mayor Joseph Hermann, Frank Bregel chief of police, Conrad Matz Campbell County attorney, patrolman John Sheeran and Charles Bullet, and county detective Edward "Buck" Hamilton. All were on Prohibition conspiracy charges. The militia also searched for John Williams, President of the union local No. 17 who they had issued a warrant out for their arrest. Both Mayor Hermann and Conrad Matz were seen as sympathetic to the strikers, and highly critical of the present of troops. A retrospective from the time charges that charges were politically motivated to punish them for their support of the strike. Previously Newport policeman had described the militia firing upon them when the tanks first arrived in Newport.

James Phillip, chairmen of the strike committee, charged that colonel Denhardt had ordered union local's 15, 16, 17 not to meet. Only allowing the skilled local No. 5 to meet, with orders that Local 5 not permit attendance from any other local members. Colonel Denhardt denied this claim.

Commenting on the arrest of public officials, Ed Hermann, the brother of Mayor Hermann, criticized the actions,

"The question is: Is this Russia or America?... Everybody who has found fault with the conduct of the troops has been subjected to persecution that smacks of czarist methods in the old days."

On February 18, the users of telephone lines was given to the militia that were previously unlisted by the cities phone company. The listed reason by Colonel Denhardt and Safety Commissioner Thomasson was to break up the liqueur and gambling handbooks. The same day the Newport Rolling Mill Company filed a court petition of charges of conspiracy to interfere with business against the Union Local Presidents and the nationwide union president and VP. Alongside this, the restraining order and charges had 140+ striking workers included it.

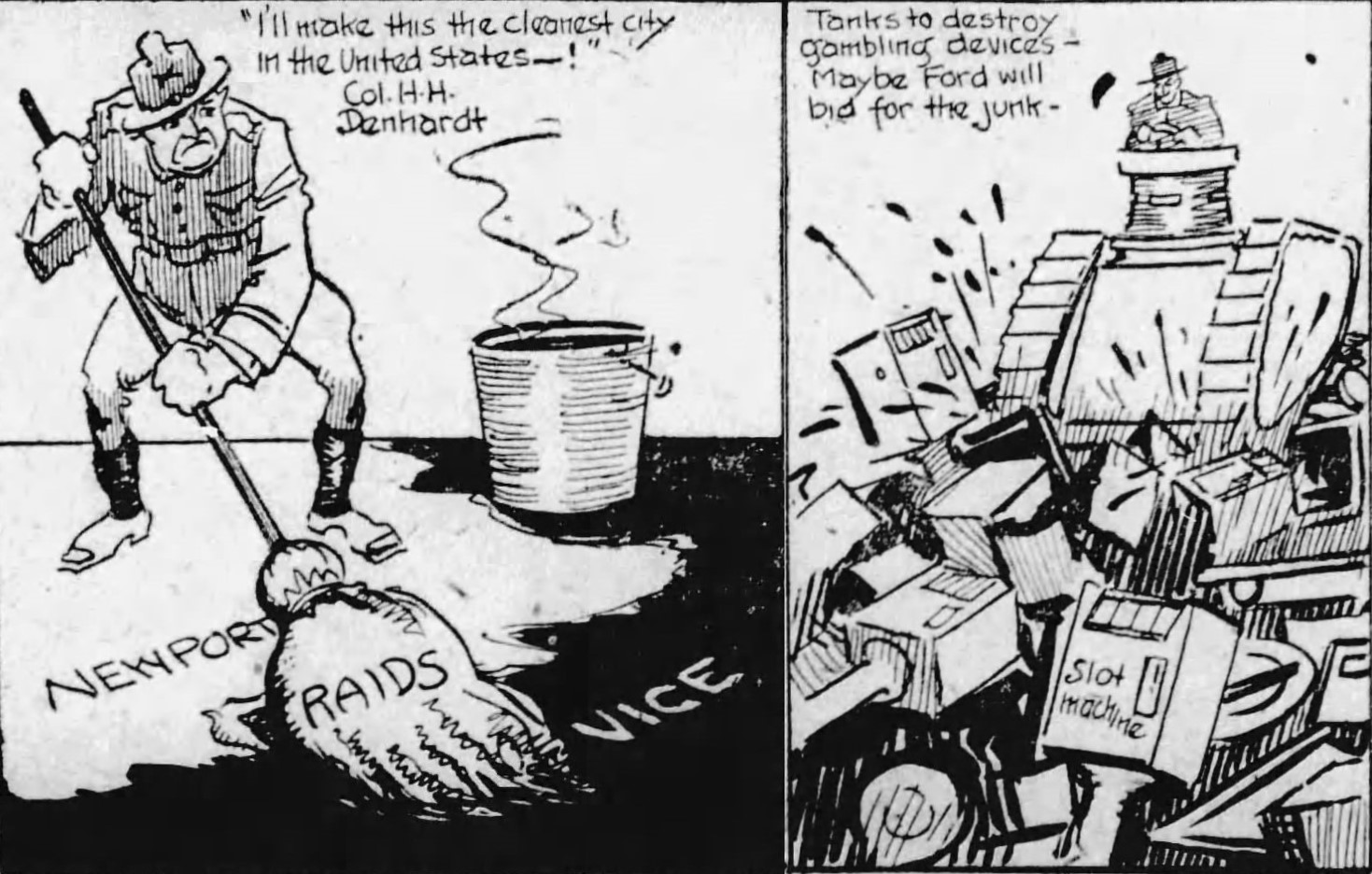
Kentucky Post comics, February 18, 1922

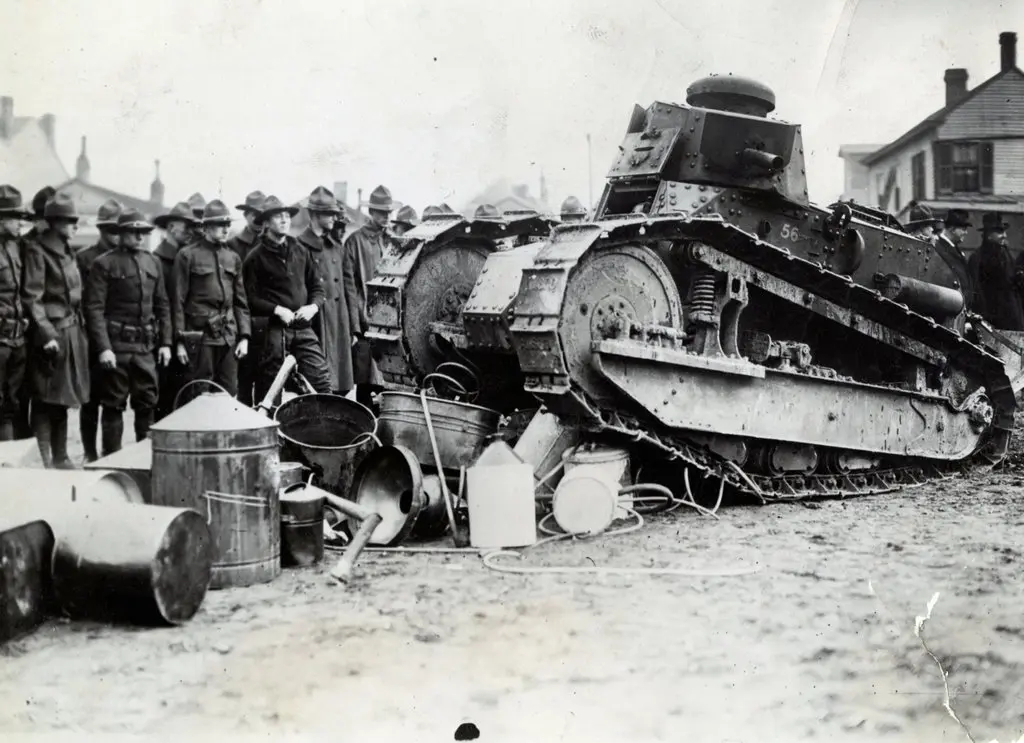
Tank crushing stills, Pub. February 18, 1922

On February 21, 1922, union Green Line street car conductors and motormen pledged $800 to strike fund to support the striking steel workers. Union railroad employees also promised to raise funds for the mill strikers.

On February 23, preachers from Newport sought the impeachment of commonwealth attorney Lawrence J. Diskin. This would be dismissed a week later as un-credible.

Several women were also allowed to 'joy ride' in the tanks by the militia including Margaret and Cora Andrews, daughters of J. G. Andrews, one of the mill owners. Newspapermen were also given the opportunity to ride in the tanks. That same day, strike leaders considered taking the issue of picketing to court, to petition for their right to picket, claiming the militia was illegally interfering with that right. M. F. Tighe the national president of the steel union would be in the Cincinnati labor temple to overseer a union meeting the next day. The meeting of the union was held in Cincinnati instead of Newport due to fear of the militia targeting and raiding them if they held it in Newport.

While at the labor temple M. F. Tighe gave an address to them on the 25th to hold strong in their strike. He also heavily condemned the American or Open Shop Plan, with other steel company members of the open shop organization supporting the Newport Rolling Mill in the strike. On the strike demands, he said:

"The Andrews have offered us more money than our scale of wages, but they did it to break the morale of men in the unions. They deny our right to organize"

The same day, A.M.J Cochran, district judge of Maysville Kentucky issued an injunction against the striker, forbidding them to maintain pickets around the plant, the order was listed as temporary, with strikers having 20 days to file an answer for why it shouldn't be permanent, which if they fail to answer becomes a permanent order by default.

This was reportedly the most drastic injunction order ever given on a labor strike by a US Federal court, up to this point. In the court hearing the judge was asked, "Isnt this the first time such an order has been issued by a federal judge." To which Judge Cochran replied "It may be... I recall no other just like it at the moment." He stated he based his decision on a recent Supreme Court decision limiting a unions picket to only one person for every exit and entrance.

While talking to the New York Times, one of the strike committee leaders commented the following on the situation,

"Our motto is, ‘We may die, but never surrender,’ and you can tell the people of the world that we are standing 100 per cent. back [sic?] of that declaration. The principles on which our union is founded are at stake, as well as the Honor of the men."

"Picketing has been forbidden by the most sweeping injunction ever Issued In this country, 'but we are not going to fight it, as we do not believe picketing Is necessary. They are making a half-hearted attempt to operate the rolling mill, but the steel plant is down. Thugs and the worst clement of labor have been imported as strikebreakers. Already many of them have been arrested and taken to other sections of the country where they are wanted for criminal charges."

On February 25, Harry Gordon, a Newport resident, was shot. Either by federal officer H.H. Marcum or Captain Ray Newett of the militia. The shooting occurred during a militia raid of a salon. (Note: At Front St. & Washington Ave) According to militia officials, Harry Gordon made a motion to reach for a gun when they fired on him and after being shot Gordon reportedly jumped from the second story window. Gordon's condition had reportedly improved by the 27th.

On February 27, it was decided that militia evidence of gamblers would be admissible to a Campbell county grand jury. Judge A.M. Caldwell said the following,

"Under the direction of Col. H. H. Denhardt, Commander of the Kentucky state troops stationed in Newport, many gambling device and illicit stills have been seized in raids. You as members of the grand jury, were permitted to view this evidence at the headquarters of the troops."

The next day, the militiamen presented the grand jury with a handbook purported to have the written names of gamblers and bootleggers within Newport. On visiting the listed location, Col. Denhardt stated, "We visited a large number of the places last night, but didn't find anything."

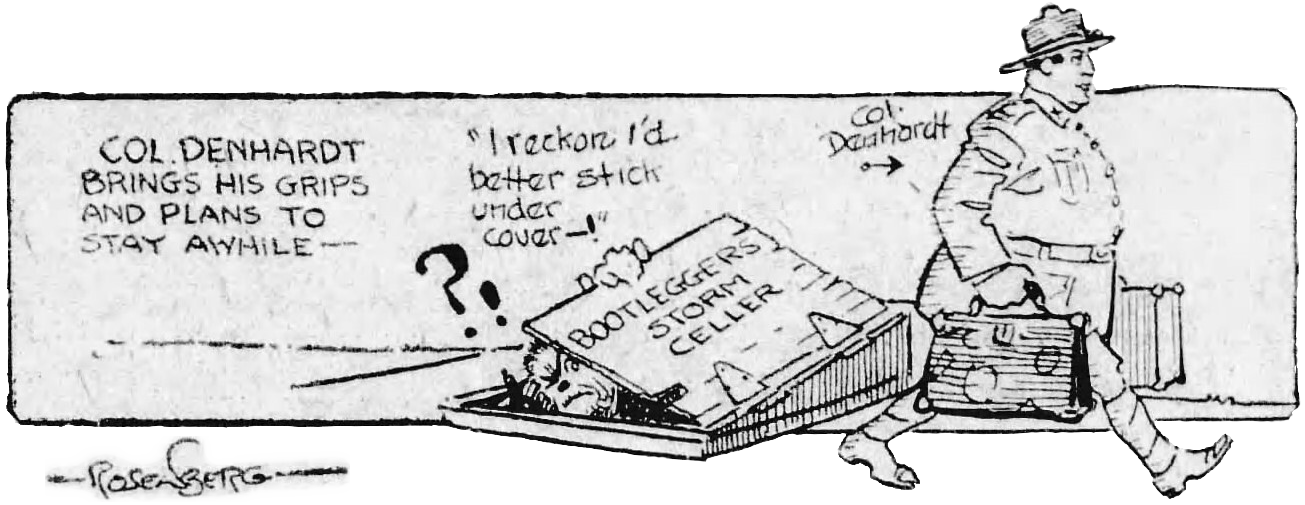
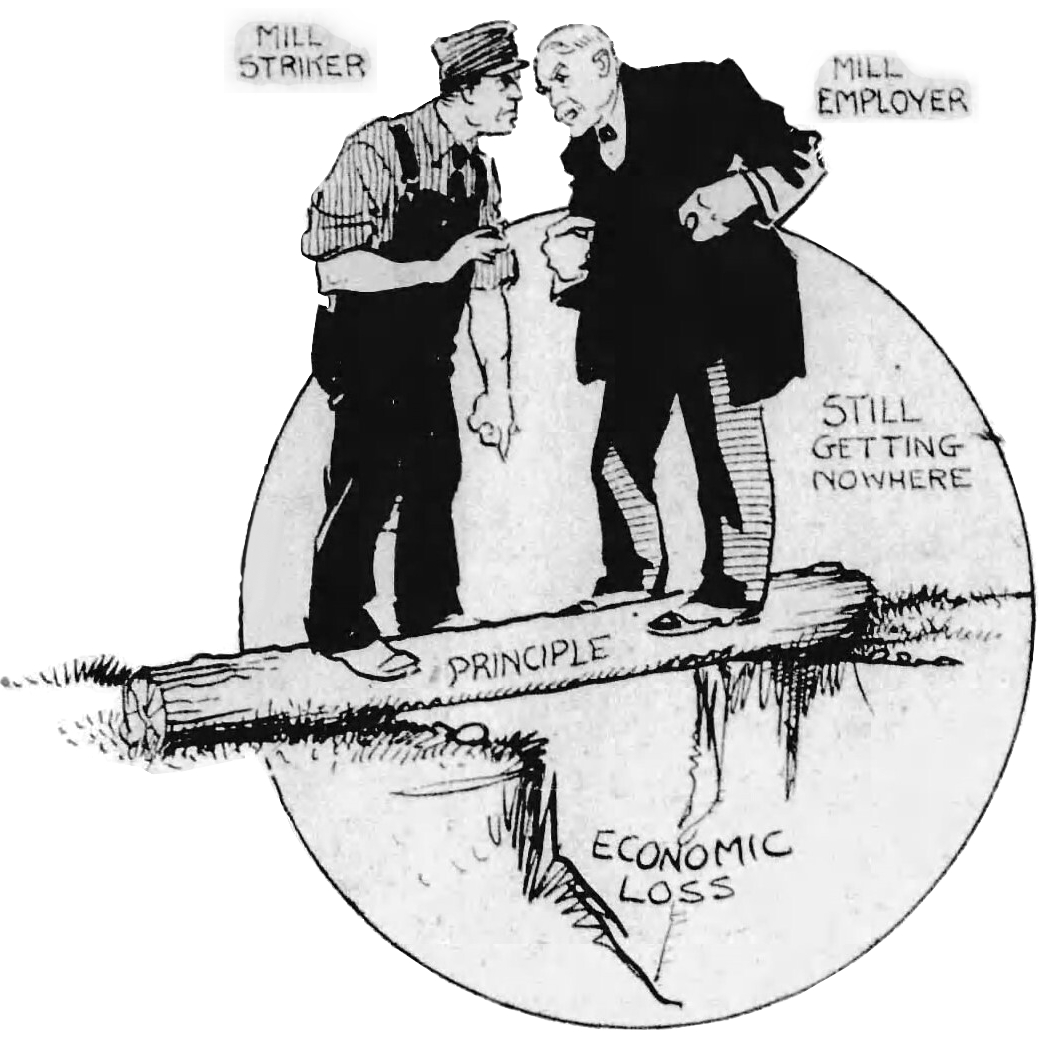
Kentucky Post, March 4, 1922

In early march the Newport Rolling Mill made an appeal for strikers to return to work, stating the company's intention to return to full operational capacity. Which the strikers Central Committee roundly rejected. The letter was as follows,

“The Newport Rolling Mill Company, a corporation, of Wilmington, Del.,, with its principal office and factory at Ninth and Lowell streets, Newport, Ky., hereby gives notice to the former employees of the Newport Rolling Mill Company, a Kentucky corporation, that, on account of the increasing demand for its products, it will, on March 8, 1922, place in operation an additional number of hot mills, and such of the workmen who desire to obtain employment with the new corporation, on an open-shop basis, will notify the company of such intention not later than March 6, 1922."

James Phillips of the Central Committee said of the ultimatum,

"The time has come... when there must be a showdown. The strike which has been overshadowed by the cleanup, is again to the front. We are back where we started ad the question is one of recognition or no recognition... The fight is no longer a local one - it is national."

A union meeting was to be held the next day, March 3, at the Cincinnati labor temple with prominent speakers. Three delegates from each of the unions in Hamilton County would be present alongside M. H. Tighe with the opening address. In addition Rev. Peter Dietz and Edward L. Hitchens of the Typographical Union No. 3 would be giving addresses. Proceeds from the card parties held by the Woman's Volunteer Relief Committee of Campbell County would also be distributed to the striker families through the central committee, of which they had managed to raise above $2,500 (equivalent to $48,086 in 2025).

Colonel Denhardt while visiting Frankfort, the capital of Kentucky, made a statement that the troops in Newport would be staying indefinitely, as long as needed to 'clean up' the city. The Newport Rolling Mill, started handing out eviction notices that day to strikers living in company houses, offering tenants a receipt in full for any back rent owed, i.e. marking it as now not owed, alongside providing tenants $10 (equivalent to $192 in 2025) for moving expenses.

Labor leaders of Newport went to Middletown on March 4 to speak to union steelworks to describe how they were carrying on their strike. That same day Colonel Denhardt raided an African American dance hall in Newport with militia.

On March 5, Sunday, the militia forced the closure of all saloons and poolrooms in the county. They cited an old blue law still in the Kentucky statute books. Major Dillon who was in charge while Col. Denhardt was on vacation, said they made this decision because men had been meeting there in a large scale.

While opening a union meeting of the Central Committee James Phillip, its chairmen, was raided by militia and arrested. Who stated they had a federal warrant out for his arrest for interfering with interstate commerce. While there Captain Norman of the Militia also asked if John Williams was present, who was the VP of the Strike Committee, as they also had a warrant out for his arrest. At the time Williams as out of town. James Phillip would by the end of the strike have been indicted on charge of interfering with interstate commerce and at one time under bonds aggregating $30,000 (equivalent to $577,038 in 2025).

Of the arrest, James Phillip commented,

"To my mind it's a campaign of intimidation... The morale of the men can't be broken by this sort of action. It's a grandstand play, and our workers, being American, are not to be frightened in this way."

On March 8, it was announced that the strikers had moved their union headquarters again (Note: To 636 Saratoga-st) where they hoped would not be interfered with by the militia. With a planned meeting on March 10.

It was announced that Union Local 5, would on March 11 hold its first meeting in the strike zone since the arrival of troops. However this was with the condition by militia commander Dillon, that the union let them know the time and location of it. The militia would not allow the same for the unskilled locals No 15, 16, & 17. Only allowing them to meet outside the strike zone and on the condition of them informing the militia of the time and place of their meetings.

The deadline for striking workers to return to work, set by the rolling mill had passed without the striking workers returning according to the strike committee. While it was estimated around a hundred strikebreakers had enabled the rolling mill to start up six mills, No. 12, 13, 14, 15, 17, and 18. Nativist and racist rhetoric was used in this discussion,

"Some unskilled labor, negroes and foreigners, have gone to work there, and smoke is coming from the stacks, but this does not mean a thing in the breaking of moral of our men... Newport people are not going to sanction the surrender of our homes to this class of people, and they will not approve an effort to drive us from the community and substitute a population which has never proven desirable in any community."

— James Phillip

The labor leaders of the Newport steel strike after being hit with conspiracy charges, made the decision to challenge the decision and stand trial on March 11. However, after this was made clear, the government quickly made an announcement of a continuance to delay the trial till a later date.

On March 13, the Andrews Steel Company followed the lead of the Newport Rolling mill in changing their charter to be incorporated in Delaware, which the rolling mill had done months before. This was to receive protection from Delaware if the Kentucky militia left. Andrews Steel also announced its intention to also start up its plant. (Note: On the Licking-Pike) That same day a meeting was held by the Skilled labor Local 5. with militia outside its meeting place but not entering the meeting.

A small dispute occurred at the end when Major Dillion brought a message to James Phillip, from Colonel Denhardt. According to James, "...the colonel said I was a liar and that he would lat down his gun and fight me." According to Dillion, "I told him [James] what the message was and said that the colonel said that if Phillips didn't like it he knew what he could do about it... I did not issue a challenge but told Phillips that the colonel would lay down his gun."

Jame Phillip made a comment on March 14, on how the union had instructed women to not provoke the company, making the following racialized comment,

"I told the women negro laborers were being marched through the streets by the mill company as a show of strength; that apparently the mill company were trying to stir up trouble... I had been told that children were yelling at the laborers, calling them negroes and scabs, and I explained to the women that this would result in one of the children being slapped, with more disorders following."

On March 13, Militia Private Frank Crones was killed after another soldier next to him accidentally dropped his weapon where it discharged after hitting the base of a stove.

On March 14, Tom Handley, a freight handler was attacked by soldiers for not moving fast enough, Handley was physically disabled, who said he was moving as fast as he could when the soldiers kicked him.

That same day, around 20 shots were fired from six or seven men walking alongside the L & N Railroad tracks, scaring residents of McCracken Av on Clifton. Reportedly the men were coming from the direction of the Andrews Steel Plant at Licking Pike. The men were reportedly shooting at random while another witness said they were shooting up into the air. The union headquarters in Cincinnati was also visited by soldiers that day, they told the meeting strikers that they would not allow them to hold their meetings. The Frankfort Calvary troop that had been present as part of the militia since February 4, returned home leaving Newport.

On March 15, Walter Larkins national vice president of the union, was in Newport to consult W. H. D. Wheat of the Globe Iron Roofing & Corrugating Company. The company relied on the mill for its steel, as a result those of union Local No. 15, who worked for the company were thrown out of work as a result of the strike.

In Cincinnati Col. Denhardt placed blame on the union for the disorder, to which union officials heavily criticized,

“...the Newport Rolling Mill Co. took machine guns and armed men into the mill before there had been any semblance of trouble, and practically sent out word for trouble to start... But that did not make the union men resort to disorder... Colonel Denhardt can say anything he wants to about Newport, anything he wants to about the vice and crime his soldiers may have discovered; of the violation of Prohibition laws, but the unions resent his effort to connect our cause with all of these evils."

— James Phillip

On March 14, they were rumors of a shooting at Tenth and Patterson streets. Which Col. Denhardt dismissed as propaganda by the 'lawless element' of Newport.

On March 16, striker applied to the Campbell county circuit court for an injunction against Col. Denhardt and militia officers for intimidating strikers. Judge A.M Caldwell after receiving the petition issued a restraining order against the soldiers from harassing them at their union headquarters. A hearing for a permanent injunction was set for March 25.

The strikers claimed the militia had ordered strikers at their headquarters, outside the strike zone, to leave and threatened them with bodily harm. They charged, on March 15 soldiers appeared at the headquarters and said if they continued to hold their meetings, given that either Edward Miller or James Phillip, union officers, the militia would harm them. Specifically, according to the union, the militia said they would throw the union leaders from the building onto the railroad track next to the building to be crushed by the trains. The union said this threatening behavior had prevented them from distributing needed relief to striking families.

Preparations were being made to continue occupying Newport through the summer by Colonel Denhardt. Work had been started on barracks outside the Newport rolling mill.

On March 17, Louis Tieman, Campbell County Sheriff reporting that he was having difficulty locating Col. Denhardt to serve him a copy of the injunction to enjoing soldiers from harassing workers at their headquarters. He wait two hours at the mill to serve the injunction to Denhardt, but was told he was out of town on March 16. The sheriff was told Denhardt would be at the mill office at about 9 am the next day, but when he went to serve the papers that day, he was told he was out of the city.

According to P. E. Gorman, president of the International Meat Cutters and Butchers Union, on March 17 when the meat cutters of Newport were scheduled to meet in Newport at Heiber's Hall, which they had informed the militia of beforehand and received permission to hold the meeting, the soldiers had rushed into thee hall, cursed and abused those present and order the hall cleared. They were then able to reconvened and were not bothered further. Gorman had left for Frankfort the next day to submit a protest against the interference of the union meeting.

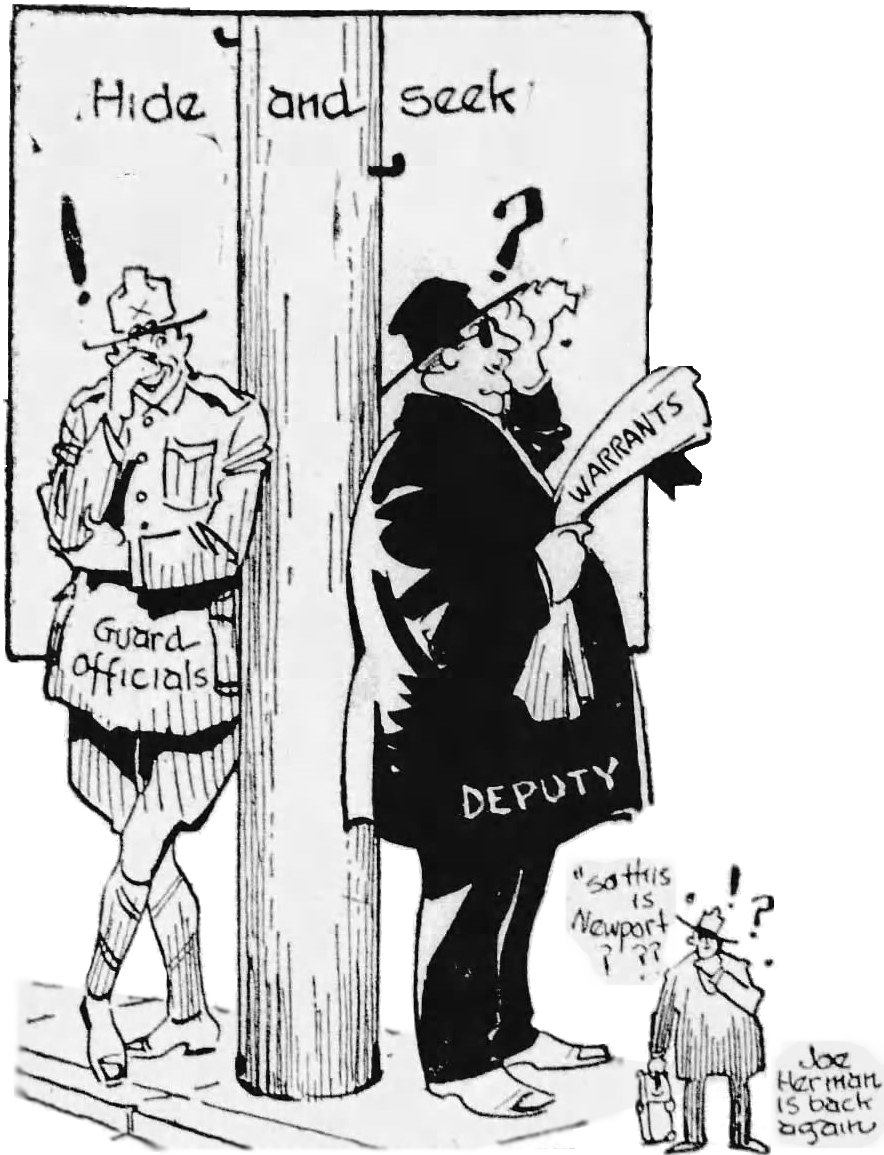
Kentucky Post Comics, March 25, 1922

On March 18, Sheriff Tieman and their police continued to look for Col. Denhardt and other officers of the Kentucky National Guard to serve them their injunction notices. Charges were made that the National Guardmen were evading being served as a way to stall for time. The militia denied this.

James Phillip appealed to Sheriff Tieman that day to ask for the recall of the militia from Newport. While no formal order for withdrawal had been received by Frankfort, Kentucky's capital, according to militia official it was expected that little by little soldiers will trickle out of the city. Reportedly the maintenance of soldiers in Newport had cost the state of Kentucky $600 to $1400 (equivalent to $11,541 to $26,928 in 2025) a day.

On March 20, militiamen accepted the injunction issued by the police. They walked into the office of sheriff Tieman to accept it. The central committee planned to send a group to Chicago, as the Garment Workers of America wanted to contribute several thousand dollars to the strike fund.

According to a motorman and conductor of Greenline, a firefight occurred between the federal soldiers of Ft.Thomas, and the Kentucky National Guard. On the night of March 19, the 10 federal soldiers and six militiamen got into a verbal spat on the streetcar, starting on the Dixie Terminal and lasted till the car reached Newport, after which the militiamen left the car and dared the soldiers to come out and fight. After which a shooting occurred, although no one was hurt. The federal soldiers of Ft. Thomas were reportedly unarmed.

On March 22, according to the union, efforts of the Newport Rolling Mill to start 10 mills had failed due to a lack of men. With fires started in 10 but three going out. Reportedly many of the men brought in to work, were brought under false pretenses, denying that a strike was ongoing to them. The company had the men sign an agreement that their railroad fare taken out of wages unless they worked fr at least three months, as a result the workers had to put in several week otherwise they would leave indebted. The union had paid several of the men travel tickets to leave Newport.

On March 23, the court case to push for a permanent injunction on militia officials to keep them from harassing union meeting moved forward in court. It was announced Charles I. Dawson the attorney general of Kentucky would representing the militia in the case.

On March 24, a meeting was held at the Labor Temple in Cincinnati; With Rev. Father Peter Dietz and James W. Wilson of the Pattern Makers' League of North America as speakers.

On March 25, six men sued Col. Denhardt for alleged beatings, and threats by the militia against them, each were suing for $5,000, (Note: (equivalent to $96,173 in 2025)) for $30,000 (equivalent to $577,038 in 2025) in total. The same day, the preliminary hearings around the conspiracy hearings against strikers, strike leaders, Newport leaders and citizens began. The defendants, demanded to know what laws they were specifically being charged with. Sawyer A. Smith, the U.S. District attorney representing the prosecution responded that it was for "the violation of U.S laws." to which Arthur C. Hall who was acting as counsel for the defendants, demanded the specific charge. After a considerable back and forth, Smith specified the charge as an interference with interstate commerce laws but reserved the right to expand charges.

William N. Andrews, secretary and one of the owners of the Newport Rolling Mill & Andrews Steel Company would be the first to testify. He said his drivers and employees were stopped on the streets while handling interstate shipments. Additionally he stated that on December 24, 1921, that his car was fired on by a group of strikers. He then said he escaped by running into the mill office. He further claimed he'd seen Charles Hamilton and Morris Hodesh, Patrolmen fraternizing with the strikers by the plant. He also said that Pat Murphy had been one of the strikers who had fired at him.

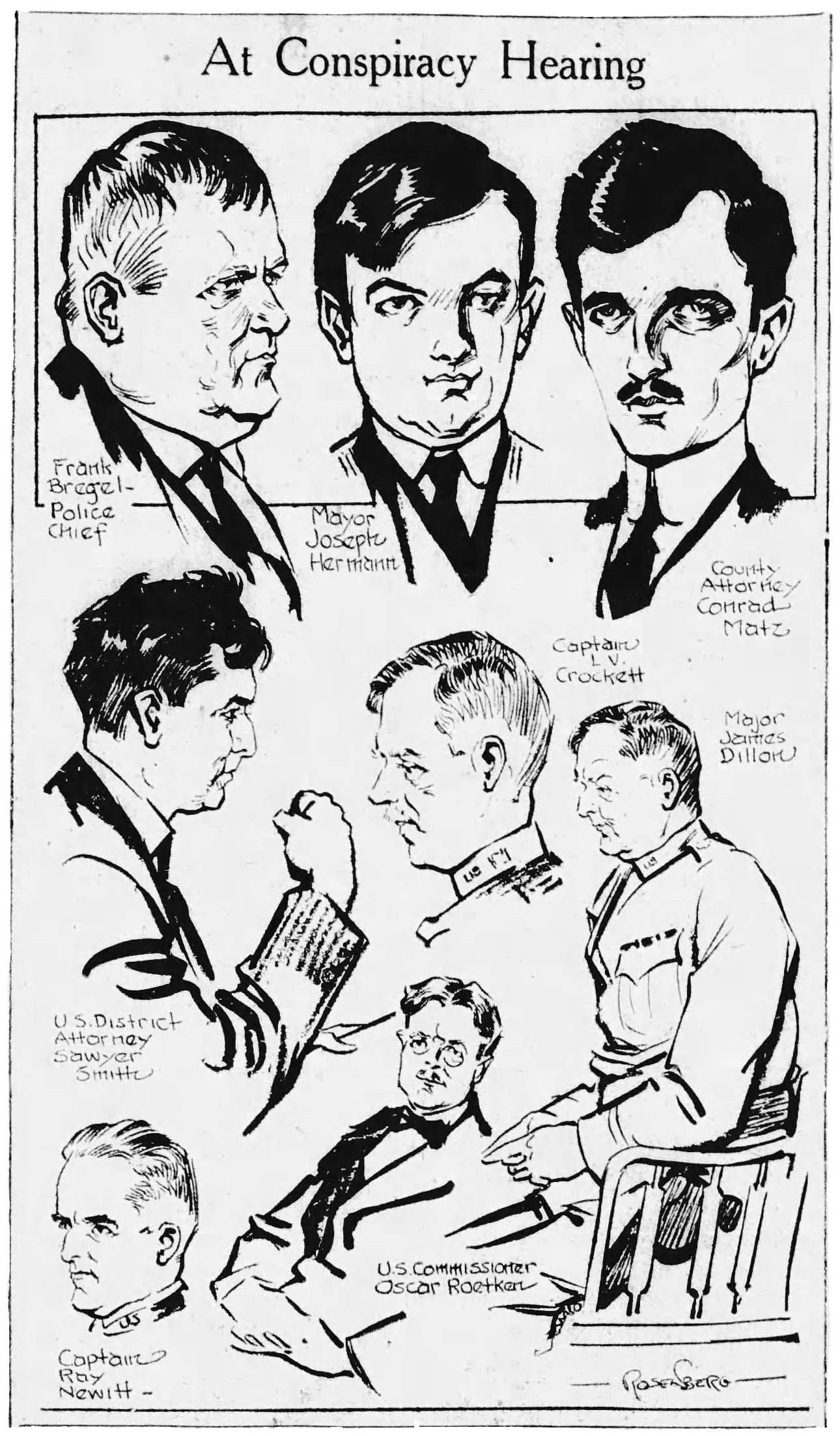
Kentucky Post, March 28, 1922

On March 26, the court case continued, the prosecution had decided to try them all collectively rather than individually. John P. Nagel, former Campbell county sheriff who was arrested on similar charges of conspiracy was dismissed by Judge Oscar H. Roetken, US Commissioner, as not guilty Monday morning, March 27.

Arthur Hall consul for the defendants demanded a separation of government witnesses. He insisted that Major James K. Dillon of the Kentucky National Guard should leave the court room, and not be allowed to be an advisor for Sawyer Smith the prosecutor. Judge Roetken ordered Dillon out of the room.

Charges against John Sheeran, Campbell county patrolman were dropped by the prosecutor after it had been revealed they had only been in office for 15 days when they were arrested. Sheeran was then placed on the stand as a witness who identified each of the accused as being officials of Campbell County and Newport.

On March 28, James Phillip said of the strike,

'It looks as tho we have the strike won... The mill company is not able to manufacture the sort of product which we turned out for them."

Arthur Hall, consul for the defendants suggested that the district attorney should apologize to his client Mayor Hermann, claiming they had prevented a riot at the rolling mill during the labor conflict. Carlton Thompson who was representing Herman said the following,

"Captain L. V. Crockett, of the National Guard, testified that Hermann came to Ninth and Brighton streets and saved the life of Case Thomasson, safety director, the night a mob was parading the streets of Newport. If the government is going to punish men for saving lives and for doing more than a their full duty, I want to know it right now so we lawyers will know how to act,"

By March 30, more than 4000 signatories had been secured for the petition asking for the removal of the National Guard from Newport. The Newport Colonial Theater would be holding a show the next day for the benefit of the steel workers. Funds raised from it would go to the strike fund. That night a meeting at the Cincinnati Labor Temple would be held with Joseph C. Haering of the Machinists' Union as a guest speaker. A W. Tunnins of the grand lodge of Railway Clerks also would be a guest speaker. On March 31, the steel union filed a petition for a removal or modification of the injunction order banning strikers from picketing the mill plant.

Speaking on the strike at the time, Earl R. Broweder stated,

"Many partial strikes have been on the steel industry for the past several months. These conflicts have taken on a violent character in some instances. In Newport, Kentucky, in one of the steel trust mill towns, the Governor of the State sent in troops, with armored cars, and ruled the strike-torn town with an iron fist for more than month. These men are largely disorganized, however, and the strikes could not spread, and were gradually smothered under the armed forces of the steel trust and the State. Unrest is smouldering, and undoubtedly in the case of a general strike movement the steel workers would become involved to a greater or lesser extent."

On April 1, four more suits were filed in court against Col. Denhardt suing for $5,000 each for mistreatment. With the previous striker suits against the Colonel, a total of $50,000 (equivalent to $961,730 in 2025) had been filed against him.

That day in court Judge A. M. Caldwell of Campbell County Circuit Court was deciding whether the civil authorities of Newport had jurisdiction over the militia. Whether to make the injunction against the militia permanent was also being decided. The state attorney representing the militia argued the civil authorities had no jurisdiction because Newport was in a state of disorder. Arthur Hall, consul to the striker argued to make the injunction permanent and that they had never legally declared martial law. Judge Caldwell would rule in favor of the militia, that civil authorities had no jurisdiction, and ruled their raids as lawful. Judge A. M. J. Cochran would deny a permanent injunction against the militia.

On April 3, one car of horses and soldiers left Newport. The next day, it was announced strikers planned to appeal to the American Federation of Labor for help in their court fights. While the Kentucky State Federation of Labor had already agreed to help the strikers taker the case to the higher courts.

On April 5, M. F. Tighe national president of the union was in Newport. On the strike he said,

"From what I know of the national conditions the strike will be won in the near future and labor thruout the country will be benetted with you."

On April 6, a new private police were seen being added to the Newport Rolling Mill.

On April 7, the grand jury failed to indict Joseph Hermann Newport's mayor, Conrad Matz county attorney and Judge William C. Buten. Instead referring their cases to the next grand jury. Frank Bregel, Newport's police chief was returned with an indictment from the grand jury. It charged that Frank Bregel and his son Frank Bregel Jr. had conspired to violate the prohibition act. In total the grand jury returned 233 indictments against defendants, who then would face trial.

On April 8, it was reported that 22 residents had been appointed as county patrolmen by Judge William C Buten to take the place of the Militia at the Newport Rolling mill.

On Sunday, April 9, the militia shut down a baseball game using the cities blue law as justification. The game was scheduled that day to be between the Old Fellow's club and the North Bend team. Col. Denhardt stationed a tank in front of the Andrews park to stop the game, games were shut down reportedly to avoid trouble. The Colonel stated, "We have ordered Sunday closing of groceries, candy stores, saloons, in fact of all business not essential to the maintenance of life." Denhardt also denied a rumor that had been circulating in Newport, "One report is that when I visited a theater in Cincinnati recently a band went on a strike, refusing to play as long as I was there."

On April 11, it was reported that many of the Newport strikers were finding jobs elsewhere. According to Jame Phillip,

"Many of our boys are landing jobs outside Newport, and I have other opportunities for matchers, doublers, catchers and pair heaters... Strikers who want to go away from Newport are requested to file notice with the Central Committee."

An editorial on the strike up to this point heavily criticized the continued presence of militia, "Extending its jurisdiction, it threatens to become a censor of liberties, a monitor of society, a municipal dictator." It focused particularly on one event, "And now comes the suppression of two ball games by Newport's military governor... Such acts of military suppression do not sit well with Americans."

On April 12, Mrs. W. J. Cain and Mrs. John Corbin of the Women's Union Label League returned to Newport after traveling to Nile and Warren, Ohio to secure more funds to aid strikers, they were able to secure at least $5,500 in funds (equivalent to $105,790 in 2025).

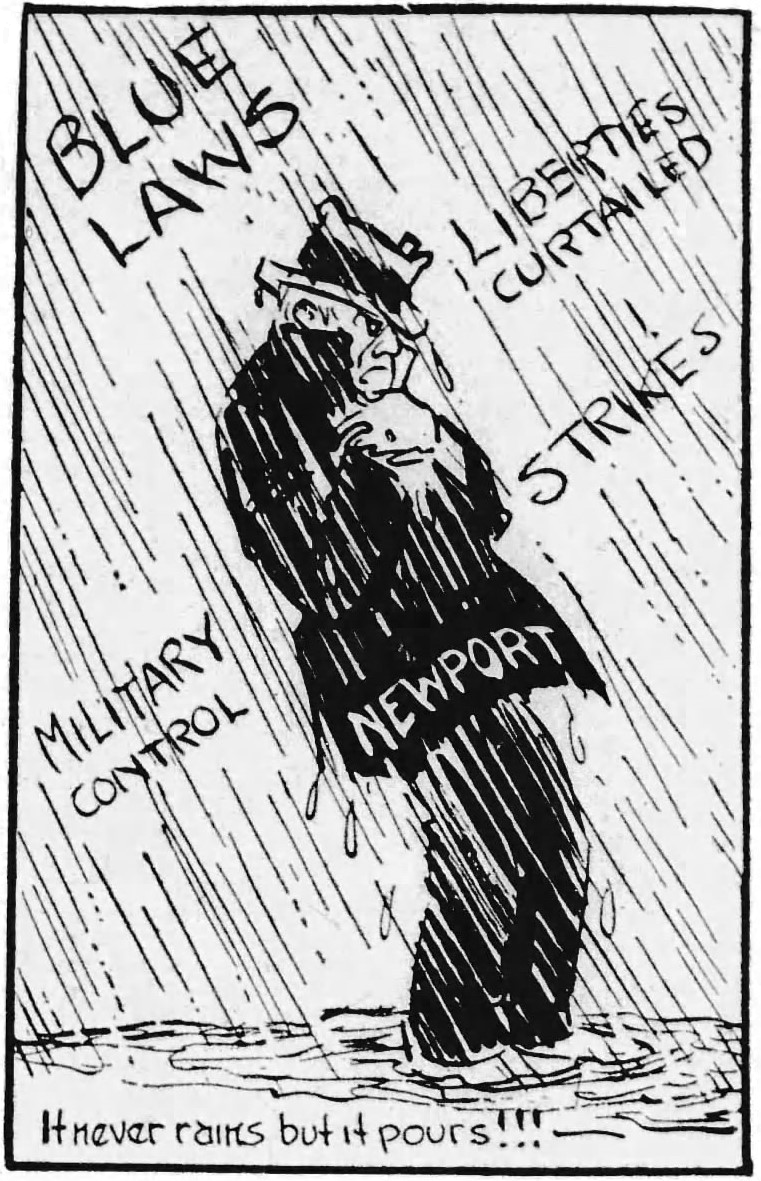
Kentucky Post, April 15, 1922

On April 12, a trial of five in Newport was ongoing in Covington, four of which were strikers. They were charged with conspiracy to interfere with interstate shipments. Alleging that the strikers had held up ruck belonging to the mill. The strikers claimed while they informed truck drivers of the strikes, and asked them not to cross the picket line, they did not issue any threats of violence or intimidation. On April 14, the four strikers and citizen were found guilty. The next day the strikers' consul, Arthur C. Hall filled a motion for retrials saying the ruling was a violation of the Clayton law.

On April 17, the Newport Rolling Mill released another statement calling for the strikers to return to working in the mill and also reiterated their policy of an open, non-union shop. That day several prohibition court cases were thrown out following motions by the defendants attorney's that to throw out the indictments on the basis that the evidence was secured by prohibition officers and national guardsman working together and sharing evidence with each other, without a search warrant thus making it inadmissible in court. Judge Cochran would rule in the defendants favor throwing out several cases on this basis. On April 20, it was reported that 91 conviction around violations of the prohibition law had been made, with 24 sent to jail, 3 sent to the penitentiary, 2 to the reformatory and 66 fined. In total the fines amounted to $21,950 (equivalent to $422,199 in 2025).

On April 19, Andrews Steel Co., the sister company to the Newport Rolling mill, filed another injunction against the striking workers. This injunction was granted on April 21.

On April 21, Colonel Denhardt demanded the suspension of Frank Bregel, with his stated reason being because of the charges of conspiracy. This was after a police report that stated Col. Denhardt had refused to turn over six soldiers "charged in warrants with contributing to juvenile delinquency" of eight underage girls. The warrant was issued by Judge Moore as a result of a several months long investigation. In addition to the six National Guards, two civilians also were charged with warrants. According to one of the victims, two officers had asked her and another girl to "go auto riding 'in the country with them.'" which they refused. Colonel Denhardt denied this. Saying the men named had never been on their roster, "But even if he were on our roster I would not turn any of my men over to the so-called police force of Newport.

=== Militia leaves ===
On April 22, it leaked that the remaining troops in Newport would by withdrawn by Monday, April 24, on the order of Gov. Morrow.

Gov. Morrow sent the following telegram to the Kentucky Post Monday, addressed to the 'people of Newport',

"The state troops have been withdrawn. For three months they have maintained law and order... For the past 3 weeks only 30 soldiers have been on duty... Newport is again on trial. I have faith in the city and its people and I sincerely trust it will not be necessary again to return troops..."

Col. Denhardt announced that all troop with the exception of Major James K. Dillon and about 12 guards will leave the city. With Major Dillon acting in capacity as an observer, making reports of the civil authorities activities to Gov. Morrow. Fourteen special policemen, under the control of safety commissioner W. Case Thomasson, would be replacing the troops, taking over the duty of patrolling the city. Secret service men were also reportedly going to be sent into the city to look for violations of the injunction against the strikers. Ten special policemen would ultimately be sworn in. Six special U.S. District deputy marshals would also be named by Roy Williams, the Covington US Marshal, to be used for enforcing the injunction against the strikers .

On April 26, Lawrence J. Diskin, commonwealth attorney appeal to drop the evidence obtained by national guards during their February raids on the basis that it was a violation of the Newport citizens constitutional rights as they were done without search warrants. Judge Caldwell would rule that their constitutional rights were violated. Captain Roy Easely, one of the raid leaders as a result asked for the judge to nolle, drop, the remaining charges. All previously mentioned notable civil figures who were hit with charges, were eventually found not guilty or had cases dismissed.

On April 27, safety commissioners, W. Case Thomasson praised union men for assisting police in 'maintaining order'. James Phillip, said of the strike "So many of out skilled men have found work elsewhere that the money is coming back to their families, and there is less distress now than at any time."

On April 28, rumors had spread that 12 women had been named special officers for duty in the Newport strike zone. James Phillip asked for all strikers who wanted positions out of town to request with the committee,

“The mill industry is opening up big... and there is a call for men. Union Officials are urging all strikers to accept temporary employment elsewhere so their families can live as they are entitled to. We don't want, however, for our men to break the tie which binds them to Newport because it has always been our pride that the Andrews Mills were worked by true blooded Americans of the best class of labor and we want the men who won this reputation to be in on the job, when we finally go back to work."

“That so many men could have stood the winter without giving in shows how much we think of the principle for which we are fighting... Labor ‘depends for its life on the closed shop and interesting developments can be expected from the convention touching on the Newport situation.”

== Aftermath ==
Labor Leaders to
Talk Newport Strike
Top: Samuel Gompers
Middle: Daniel J. Tobin and Matthew Woll
Bottom: John L. Lewis
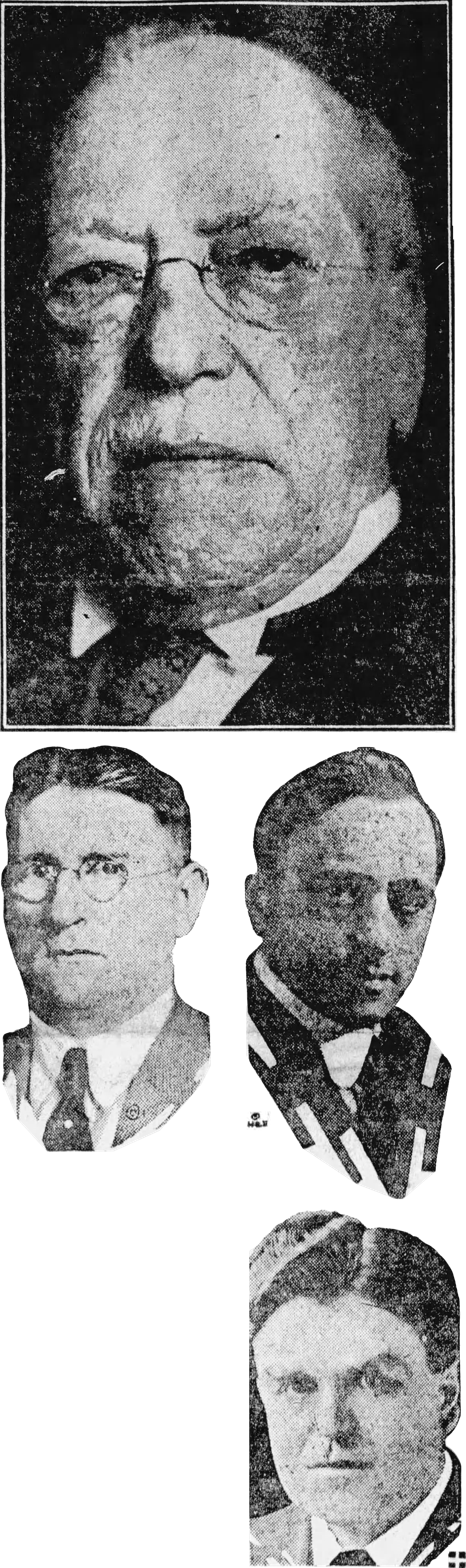

=== Decline ===
On May 30, the ten special policemen who were previously sworn into duty were set to be dismissed, as W. C. Thomasson stated they were no longer needed. The only special officers to be in Newport after their dismissal would be the deputy US Marshals sent by Judge Cochran to enforce the injunctions against the strikers.

On the strike Phillips said, "The strike is won. Places left vacant by the union workers can not be filled. Men skilled in the iron industry are scarce, and any firm having such men are holding onto them. We will win in the end, because our skilled men cannot be replaced."

From June 12 to June 24, the AFL held its annual 42nd convention in Cincinnati.

On June 17, plans were announced to move the 1922 American Federation of Labor Convention from Cincinnati to Newport for one day next week. Ed Miller president of Union Local 5. had managed to get in contact with the labor leaders of the AFL, and urged them to hold an open-air meeting in Newport to show their support. The labor leaders of the AFL agreed, setting plans to gather at the Hippodrome Theater in Newport on June 21 to address the striking steel workers. Samuel Gompers heading the group of labor leaders as the president of the AFL, would hold a mass meeting at 7:30 PM that day, with Michael Tighe president of the steel workers as acting chairman.

Some prominent leaders included would be, John L. Lewis Pres. of the UMW; William Woll VP of the UMW; Daniel J. Tobin Pres. of the Teamsters; James P. Holland Pres. of the New York Federation of Labor and Marshall Martin editor of the Blacksmith union Journal. It was expected to be one of the largest labor meetings ever staged in Northern Kentucky. Members of the Musicians Union would also be present to provide music.

Samuel Gompers addressed a crow of +2,000 attended at the Hippodrome Theater on June 21. The meeting was opened by Michael F. Tighe President of the steel union; Of the strike, his paraphrased statements were as follows: that seldom have civilized people been compelled to submit to the treatment that the strikers had received in the past year in Newport, and that he criticized Gov. Morrow for sending troops, and the injunction which has banned strikers from picketing. After his speech, Marshall Martin of the Blacksmith's journal spoke, he urged strikers not give up and that he criticized the ministers who has signed the telegram previously asking Morrow to send troops.

After which Gompers spoke, before which the national anthem was played the musicians unions while he was introduced. He stated his belief that victory was near for the Newport mill men. He stated that he believed strikes should be avoided whenever possible but when life, ideals and honor are at stake one should be willing to strike, and praised the women who had supported the strike.

William Green, then secretary of the UMW, then spoke. At the time the UMW was conducting a national strike. He appealed to the right of collective bargaining and urged workers to struggle on. He praised the public officials who supported the strikers. In particular Joseph Herman who was on the stage, he was greeted with a standing ovation by the crowd. Lastly James P. Holland spoke, urging the strikers to hold out.

On August 22, three nonunion workers were reportedly beaten by men who were in a crowd of eight, when it was learned they were nonunion workers when they were returning from work. (Note: At Newport & Covington Bridge at 4th st.) One got a shoulder injury from falling, and badly cut and bruised on the face. All three got bruised on the face and head.One of the attacker reportedly suffered an injury to their leg.

On August 31, it was announced that the wages of workers of the Andrews steel plant and Newport Rolling Mill would be increased 20% effective September 1. This was following the wage increases recently granted by the US Steel Corp. The workers had previously got a wage increase on July 1. It was expected that the hot mill men would receive an additional wage increase on September 10. According to Joe B. Andrews all departments of the steel plant and rolling mill were operating successfully.

On December 11, Afred Maybury Newport Magistrate announced they had given instructions to Harry Hall, Constable of the First District, to assist in suppressing any disorder around the Newport Rolling Mill.

It was announced that on December 23, the Newport Rolling Mill would temporarily shut down till the 26th, with the exception of the hot mill which would resume January 2, 1923. During the shutdown, the hot mills were reportedly going to be overhauled. After January 1, the company planned to employ 500 more men.

=== End of the strike ===
On July 7, 1928, the seven-year anniversary of the initial walkout by steel workers, the strike was officially called off. Union officials said the strike was being abandoned as they saw no hope for victory and "for the benefit of citizens of Newport." Reportedly many strikers had been slowly taken back at intervals since the removal of the militia. The company stated they would not be making room for any of the remaining workers on strike before it was officially called off.

=== Broader implications ===
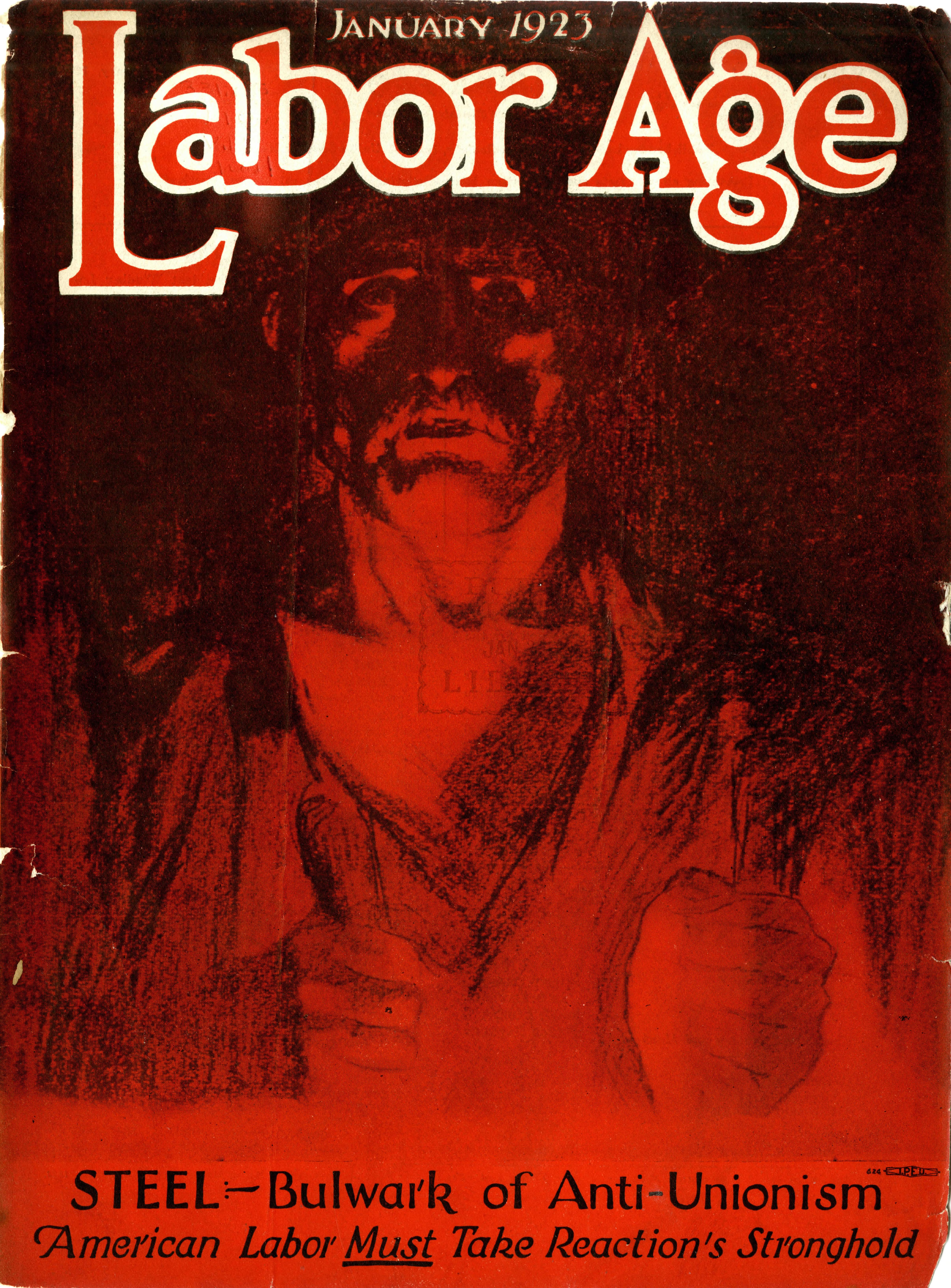

The strike played a small role in electoral politics, particularly President Calvin Coolidge's presidential bid due to their association with Gov. Morrow, given his connection to the Newport strike. One article of the time accused President Calvin Coolidge of appointing Governor Morrow to the United States Railroad Labor Board on the basis of his previous actions of sending militia to Newport, which the article claims was to crush the strike. It further claimed it represented dismal prospects for labor in the rail industry,

"With Kentucky's military governor soon to appear on the Board, the bona fida railroad shopcraft men will hardly look for any more sympathetic consideration than what he gave the steel strikers in Newport, Ky."

It also played a role in Col. H. H. Denhardt's successful run for lieutenant governor of Kentucky, with it being a controversy due to his involvement in leading the national guard that ultimately suppressed the strike.

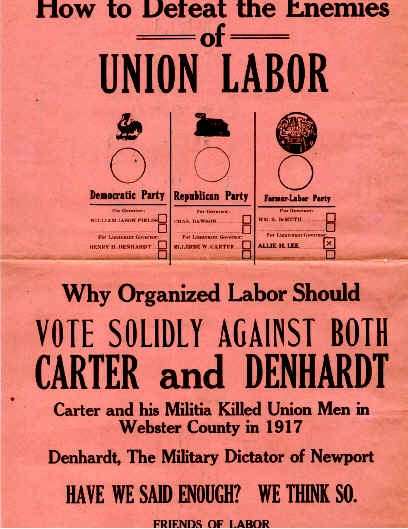
Pro-labor campaign poster from Campbell County criticizing National guard use by Henry H. Denhardt in Newport

A longstanding effect of the strike was playing a role in the eventual establishment of the Kentucky State Police. First with its predecessor the Kentucky Active Militia established in 1934. Prior to the strike no standing state police force existed in Kentucky however the use of National Guards in the strike had led to greater calls for this. In the 1922 Annual Report, the chief of Militia Bureau stated their concerns,

"Emergency duty in a strike area is the most disagreeable feature of National Guard service. Not only does such duty require a man in the ranks to use arms, when necessary, perhaps against his own friends and fellow workmen, but such duty also imposes actual hardship on the Guardsman, both in the matter of long absences from his business and in he violence which he is frequently called upon to overcome.

It has been occasionally suggested to the Militia Bureau from National Guard sources that such emergency duty should not be required of the National Guard, but should be imposed upon a State police force organized to supplement the local police authorities when needed. The Militia Bureau recognizes the advantages of such a plan, but it is believed that this course would cause the National Guard to forfeit much of the support now given it by the States..."

That same year, in January 1922 legislation was introduced to establish a state police force, however it failed to pass. Until it would eventually be established in 1934.

The most notable implication of the strike was the breakdown of union membership across the country following the beginning of the American 'open shop' plan by employers following the end of WW1, an attempt to break up unions across. The Newport strike was a microcosm of that much broader trend, of which the steel industry was at the heart of. The defeat of it, the 1919 General Steel Strike and the Great Railroad Strike of 1922, would precede a half a decade long decline of labor.

== See also ==
- Newport, Kentucky
- List of striking US workers by year
