= Steel Workers Organizing Committee =

The Steel Workers Organizing Committee (SWOC) was one of two precursor labor organizations to the United Steelworkers. It was formed by the CIO (Committee for Industrial Organization) on June 7, 1936. It disbanded in 1942 to become the United Steel Workers of America. The Steel Labor was the official paper of SWOC.

== Early union organizing in steel ==
A wide variety of unions had formed in the brand-new steel industry in the 1900s. Local steel unions formed in steel mills here and there, but no national organization existed.

The Long Depression of 1873–79 forced a number of unions to merge in order to survive. In 1876, the Sons of Vulcan (a puddlers union), the Iron and Steel Heaters Union (a union of workers who operated roughing and rolling machines, and who acted as catchers for still-hot rolled steel), the Iron and Steel Roll Hands Union (another union of roughers, rollers and catchers) and the Nailers Union (riveters) merged to form the Amalgamated Association of Iron and Steel Workers (the AA).

The AA was a founding member of the Federation of Organized Trades and Labor Unions (FOTLU) and its successor, the American Federation of Labor (AFL).

While the AA had a good degree of success organizing steel workers, it also had some significant failures. In 1892, the union fought and lost the Homestead strike, which nearly bankrupted the union and cost it a majority of its members. It attempted a recognition strike at U.S. Steel in 1901, which also failed and cost the union most of its members in that influential company. It engaged in a strike in 1919 for which it was ill-prepared and which was broken during the Red Scare.

== AFL attempts to organize in steel ==
By mid-1933, the AA was almost moribund. Union president Michael F. Tighe, 76, was referred to as "Grandmother" due to his advanced age and timidity, and he suspended locals that called for aggressive action.

Passage of the National Industrial Recovery Act (NIRA) on June 16, 1933, sparked widespread union organizing throughout the country, even in the steel industry. The AA's membership rose to more than 150,000 by February 1934 (although most had not become dues-paying members).

In 1934, an opposition group known as the Rank and File Movement formed within the AA. A number of militant local affiliates had sprung up across the nation or had joined existing lodges in large enough numbers to elect their own, militant leaders. The locals coalesced into the Rank and File Movement and challenged the conservative leadership to act, demanding that the AA reorganize along industrial union lines.

At its annual convention in San Francisco in October 1934, the AFL called for an organizing campaign in the steel industry. As early as 1926, AFL president William Green had convinced the federation's executive council to re-establish federal labor unions (FLUs) as a compromise between workers' desires to belong to an industrial union and the jurisdictional rights of existing AFL affiliates. The FLU had been one of Samuel Gompers' favorite recruiting devices. All workers in a plant were recruited into a single union. Theoretically, after organizing in an industry was complete, the FLUs would be broken up and the workers parceled out to the appropriate craft union. Although a number of AFL affiliates protested the use of FLUs, Green put them off — declaring that the FLUs were but temporary organizing devices.

The AFL seemed committed to organizing with FLUs, and to organizing the steel industry. Between 1932 and 1934, the number of FLUs had risen to 1,798 from 307.

But no organizing drive in steel emerged. The AFL executive council meeting in January 1935 considered organizing steel workers into FLUs, but only Green and two other vice presidents supported the plan. Green pointed out to the council that the AA had no resources to organize new members, and was philosophically opposed to organizing any but skilled workers. But the council refused to authorize an AFL-led organizing drive. Instead, the council voted to initiate a joint organizing drive similar to the failed 1919 campaign.

Green dared not refuse the AFL executive council's instructions to undertake a joint organizing drive, but he did not wholeheartedly implement a plan, either. For the first six months of the year, Green did nothing. After the creation of the federal Steel Labor Relations Board in late June 1935 (an independent labor relations board created by President Franklin D. Roosevelt because of the failures of the National Labor Board), Green worked with Tighe, steel industry executives and the steel board to create a plan to allow collective bargaining in the steel industry. The talks dragged on through the end of the year. The sticking point was the AFL's demand for representational exclusivity (the concept that if a majority of workers voted for the union then all employees in the bargaining unit should belong to the union).

By early 1935, what little organizing the AA had exhibited in the steel industry melted away. Continued pressure by the steel companies—including the widespread establishment of company unions, the use of violence, spies and unwarranted dismissal—had decimated the AA's membership. When the U.S. Supreme Court struck down the NIRA on constitutional ground on May 27, 1935, the organizing drive collapsed. Tighe reported to the AFL in May 1935 that his membership stood at 8,600. At the AFL's convention in Atlantic City in October 1935, the executive council issued a report in which it claimed it had not been "advisable to launch an organizing campaign for the steel industry" in the previous year.

== Establishment of SWOC ==
Other events swiftly overtook the AA. The National Labor Relations Act was signed into law by President Roosevelt on July 5, 1935.

Committee for Industrial Organization (CIO) formed within the AFL on November 8, 1935. The AFL had long resisted industrial unionism, but the changing nature of work and the American economy were draining the AFL of members and inhibiting organizing.

Under the leadership of John L. Lewis, the United Mine Workers of America (UMW) had rapidly expanded its membership. It had even gained a foothold in the so-called "captive mines"—those mines owned and operated by the steel industry to provide coke and coal for steel production. So long as the steel industry remained nonunion, pressure could be put on the captive mines to stay nonunion. And throughout the country, coal operators were using the competitive advantage of the captive mines to stonewall the UMW.

== CIO efforts to woo the AA ==
Lewis and the Congress of Industrial Organizations did not wish to leave the AFL. In order to avoid antagonizing the AFL but eager to begin an organizing drive in steel along industrial union lines, the CIO resolved to work through the AA instead.

The CIO first attempted to push a steelworker industrial organizing plan through the January 1936 AFL executive council meeting. The CIO proposed raising $500,000 toward a $1 million goal to fund the organizing drive. The CIO also requested a jurisdictional waiver, so that skilled workers could be assigned to the AA and while other workers joined a new industrial steelworkers union. The executive council rejected the plan and demanded that the CIO disband. To maintain the pretense of action, the executive council then passed a resolution instructing Green to come up with his own organizing plan for the steel industry.

The CIO then attempted to subvert the AA from within. If the AA changed its mind about organizing along industrial lines, Green and the AFL—which above all else respected each member union's autonomy—could do little to prevent the organizing campaign. The CIO approached President Tighe on April 15 and asked to speak to delegates at the AA's convention, but Tighe refused to say whether he would permit a CIO address. Fewer than 100 delegates gathered at the AA's convention in Canonsburg, Pennsylvania, on April 28, 1936. Tighe locked the doors of the convention hall to keep the CIO officials out. Tighe then asked the members to vote on whether they wished to hear the CIO offer. The delegates voted 42 to 43 (with seven abstentions) to refuse to hear the proposal. But the CIO found a way to end-run the AA leadership. When the Pennsylvania State Federation of Labor sent a delegation to deliver greetings to the AA, the delegation included John Brophy, the newly hired organizing director of the CIO. Tighe initially refused him entrance, but was forced to give Brophy access under pressure from the delegates. In his remarks, Brophy explained the offer of the CIO: $500,000 for the organization of the steel industry, provided the campaign occurred along industrial lines. A motion was made and carried to appoint a committee to study the proposal.

Tighe remained uncertain as to what course to take. He sent AA international secretary Louis Leonard to consult with Green at Green's home in Coshocton, Ohio. Green countered the CIO offer with a pledge of 35 organizers and an undetermined amount of money. Leonard then met Lewis on June 3 in Washington, D.C. Lewis made it clear that the CIO would move ahead with an organizing drive in the steel industry with or without the AA.

Leonard met with the AA executive board the following day. The AA officials accepted the CIO proposal. They voted to affiliate with the CIO, and a memorandum was drafted which established the AA as an administrative unit within the CIO's steelworker organizing committee. Subsequently, the Steel Workers Organizing Committee (SWOC) was formed in Pittsburgh on June 7, 1936.

Green was outraged. He denounced what he saw as the takeover of the AA on June 5, and declared that the CIO steelworker organizing drive would fail. More importantly, however, Green interpreted the move as proof that the CIO was engaging in dual unionism. After specious charges were drawn up and an illegal trial conducted, the AFL suspended the 10 unions which belonged to the CIO—the AA among them.

== Structure of SWOC ==
SWOC's internal structure was dictated in most ways by the agreement with the AA. The AA gave SWOC the constitutional legitimacy it needed in order to function as a union. The AA remained inactive except for issuing charters and the approval of contracts for existing lodges. The AA authorized SWOC to handle all matters regarding organizing and to negotiate contracts on behalf of new locals. The only provision for internal governance was that the chairman of the CIO was empowered to appoint a director for SWOC and a policy committee.

For all intents and purposes, the AA ceased to exist and function after it was subsumed by SWOC. Philip Murray was appointed director of SWOC, and ran the organization (and union) until his death. Murray oversaw a $500,000 budget and 36 organizers.

Steel Labor was the official paper of SWOC. Its first editor was J. B. S. Hardman. The first issue was published was August 1, 1936. The newspaper's initial purpose was to promote social change, but this mission changed over time to become more moderate. Information provided about the labor movement in America to steelworkers was limited.

== Organizing successes ==
SWOC had a major success on March 2, 1937, when the union signed a collective bargaining agreement with U.S. Steel. SWOC effectively infiltrated the employer's company unions and turned the unions against the employer. Green denigrated the contract for not achieving a closed shop.

SWOC suffered its first defeat when it attempted to organize the 186,000 workers laboring for "Little Steel"—Republic Steel, Bethlehem Steel, Youngstown Sheet and Tube, National Steel, Inland Steel and American Rolling Mills. Worker sentiment for a strike was strong, leading to a walkout in 1937 but SWOC was financially exhausted and had not adequately planned for a protracted dispute. Unlike U.S. Steel, the companies of Little Steel were willing to use violence, espionage and large numbers of strikebreakers to crush the union. The worst incidence of violence occurred in Chicago Illinois, when 10 people were killed and 30 wounded during the Memorial Day Massacre. At least six other people, all union members or supporters, were killed before the strike ended later that summer

The AA—and SWOC—had a role in the most important labor relations court case of the modern era. During SWOC's attempt to organize Jones and Laughlin Steel in 1936, the company summarily fired hundreds of union supporters. SWOC filed an unfair labor practice against the company and won. Republic Steel appealed in court, alleging that the National Labor Relations Act was unconstitutional. But in National Labor Relations Board v. Jones & Laughlin Steel Corporation, 301 U.S. 1 (1937), the U.S. Supreme Court upheld the constitutionality of the NLRA.

SWOC inspired a number of similarly-structured organizing committees in the CIO. But none of these were as successful as SWOC.

Organizing slowed after the initial burst of success. By 1939, SWOC was in debt by $2.5 million. Little Steel continued to strongly resist unionization, establishing company unions and intimidating workers. SWOC made little inroad below the Mason–Dixon line, except for a few beachheads in border states which came about as part of its agreements with U.S. Steel. However, the callous treatment of workers displaced by technological change occasionally helped SWOC organize a plant here or there.

== Second wave of success ==
Little Steel capitulated in the spring of 1941. Improving economic conditions had not led to rising salaries, and worker walk-outs involving tens of thousands of employees lashed Bethlehem Steel in New York and Pennsylvania. Long-delayed court rulings forced the company to dismantle its company unions, and most of the company's plants voted for the union by the fall. Huge majorities voted for the union at Youngstown Sheet and Tube and at Inland Steel. Republic Steel quietly signed contracts soon thereafter, and the union expanded its membership at U.S. Steel. Wage increases in the contracts averaged 10 percent a year. Once only an organization which existed solely on paper, SWOC now had more members than the Mine Workers.

SWOC had had little success at the historically important Homestead mill. But in April 1941, after layoffs sparked renewed interest in the union, U.S. Steel signed a contract with SWOC. It marked the successful return of a union to the plant for the first time since 1892.

In 1940, SWOC director Philip Murray was elected president of the CIO.

== Disbanding SWOC ==
SWOC and the AA were disbanded at a convention held in Cleveland, Ohio on May 22, 1942. A new organization, the United Steel Workers of America (USWA), was founded. Philip Murray was installed as the new union's president. David J. McDonald was appointed the union's first secretary-treasurer.
