= Michael F. Tighe =

American steel worker and unionist (1858 - 1940)

Michael Francis Tighe (1858-1940) was an American steelworker and trade union leader. He was a member of the Amalgamated Association of Iron and Steel Workers for 64 years. From 1911 to 1919, he served as secretary-treasurer. He then was elected national president, a position he kept until December 31, 1936. He was known as a relative conservatism within the labor movement and opposed John L. Lewis and the formation of the CIO before eventually working with the CIO's Steel Workers Organizing Committee. The AA and SWOC merged in 1942 to form the United Steelworkers.

== Early life ==
Tighe was the son of a steelworker. He began working at the age of 10 in a nail factory in Wheeling, West Virginia where he made $2 a week. He began his career as a steelworker at 14 and served an apprenticeship as a member of the Sons of Vulcan.

== Personal ==
Tighe married to Elizabeth Leonhart of Marietta, Ohio on August 15, 1889. The couple had one child, who died at the age of 3. Tighe died at the age of 82 at the West Penn Hospital following a paralytic stroke which occurred while reading a newspaper on his porch at his home in Pittsburgh's East Liberty neighborhood. He picked out a gravesite in Greenwood Cemetery in Wheeling prior to his death.
