= 1919 General Steel Strike =

Nationwide labor strike in the US

Great Steel Strike of 1919
- Part of the First Red Scare
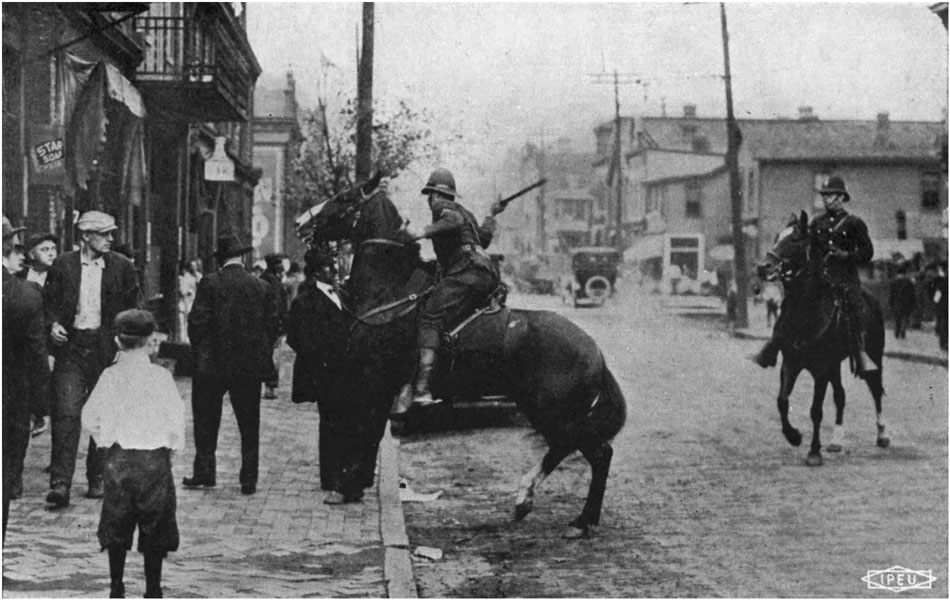
- An unprovoked attack by mounted state police during the strike in Pennsylvania in September 1919
- Date: September 22, 1919 – January 8, 1920
- Location: Nationwide
- Methods: Striking

Parties
| Amalgamated Association of Iron, Steel and Tin Workers (AA); American Federation of Labor | U.S. Steel; Steel companies |

Lead figures
| John Fitzpatrick; William Z. Foster; Mother Jones | Elbert Gary |

Number
| 365,000 | |

The Great Steel Strike of 1919 was an attempt by the American Federation of Labor to organize United States Steel, the leading company in the American steel industry. The AFL formed a coalition of 24 unions, all of which had grown rapidly during World War I. In the lead role would be the Amalgamated Association of Iron, Steel and Tin Workers (AA) with a five-member steering committee. The strike began on September 22, 1919, and finally collapsed on January 8, 1920. The opposition led by Elbert H. Gary, president of U.S. Steel, had triumphed.

== Background ==
The AA had formed in 1876. It was a union of skilled steel and ironworkers which was deeply committed to craft unionism. However, technological advances had slashed the number of skilled workers in both industries.

In 1892, the AA had lost a bitter strike at the Carnegie Steel Company's steel mill in Homestead, Pennsylvania. The Homestead strike, which culminated with a day-long gun battle on July 6 that left 10 dead and dozens wounded, led to a wave of de-unionization. From a high of more than 24,000 members in 1892, union membership had sunk to less than 8,000 by 1900.

The union attempted to organize workers in the tin industry, but a sudden wave of industry consolidations left the union facing the gigantic U.S. Steel corporation. In the U.S. Steel Recognition Strike of 1901, the union struck the fledgling company and won nearly all its demands. But the union's executive board wanted more and rejected the pact. U.S. Steel was able to muster its resources and break the strike.

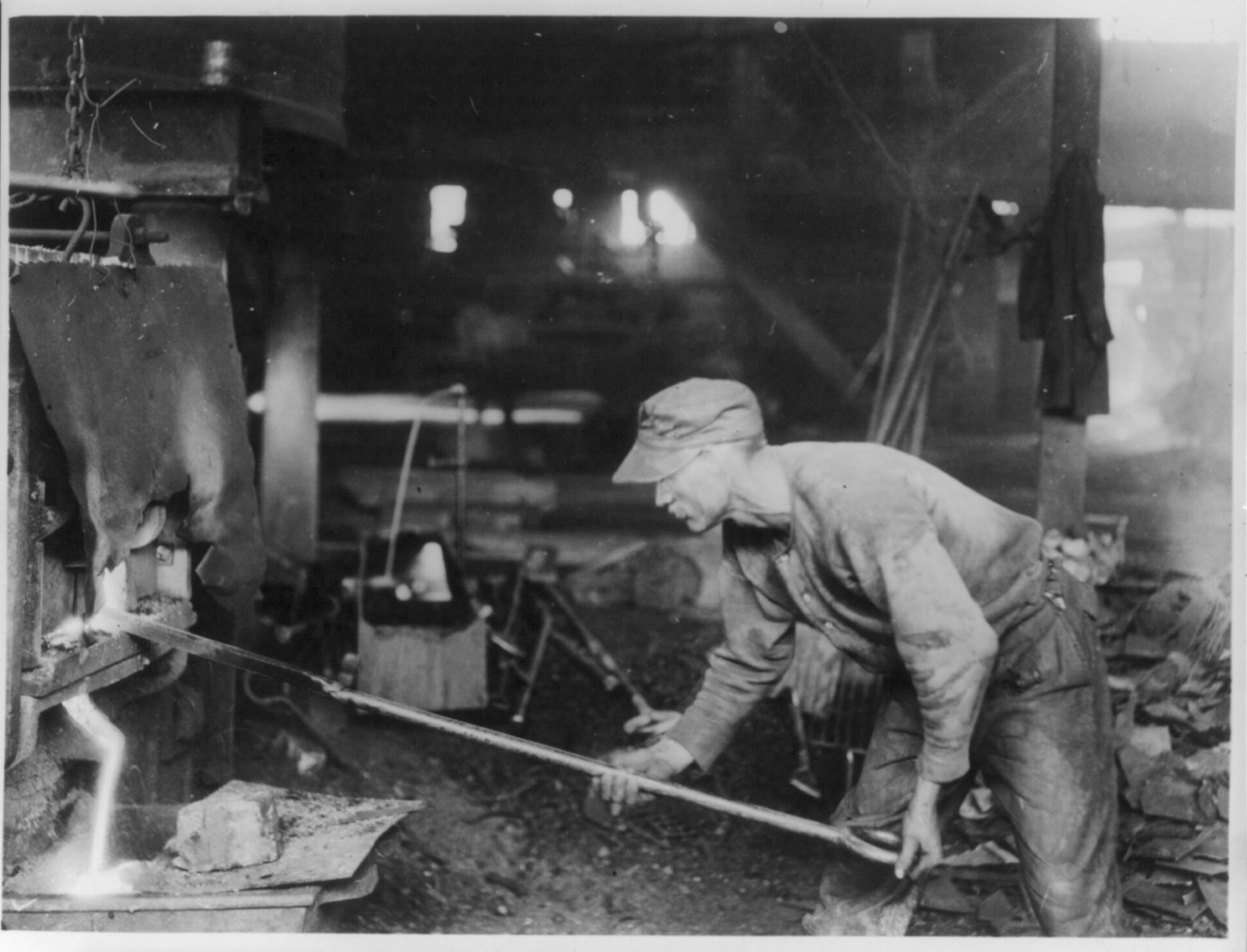
View of a steelworker at his work of puddling, where he is "working up" his "ball of iron" (1919)

In 1892, The American Federation of Labor (AFL) began organizing unskilled iron and Steelworkers into federal unions. Local groups of wire drawers, house men, tube workers, blast furnace men and others had all formed unions. The Federal Association of Wire Drawers was chartered in 1896, the Tin Plate Workers' Protective Association in 1899, the International Association of Blast Furnace Workers in 1901, and the International Association of Tube Workers in 1902. Most internationals disbanded after a short time, but many local federal unions became deeply entrenched in the workplace.

Insistence on retaining its craft union identity kept it from establishing a stronger presence in the metals industries. The union was in crisis, however. The steel industry was growing quickly, and the skilled jobs in which AA members worked were disappearing. The union had to act in order to save itself. At the November 1909 AFL convention, AA president P.J. McArdle introduced a resolution, which quickly passed, calling for an organizing drive at U.S. Steel. By December, organizers were flooding plants throughout the Northeast and Midwest. But workers remained skittish after the failed 1901 strike, and the drive never got off the ground.

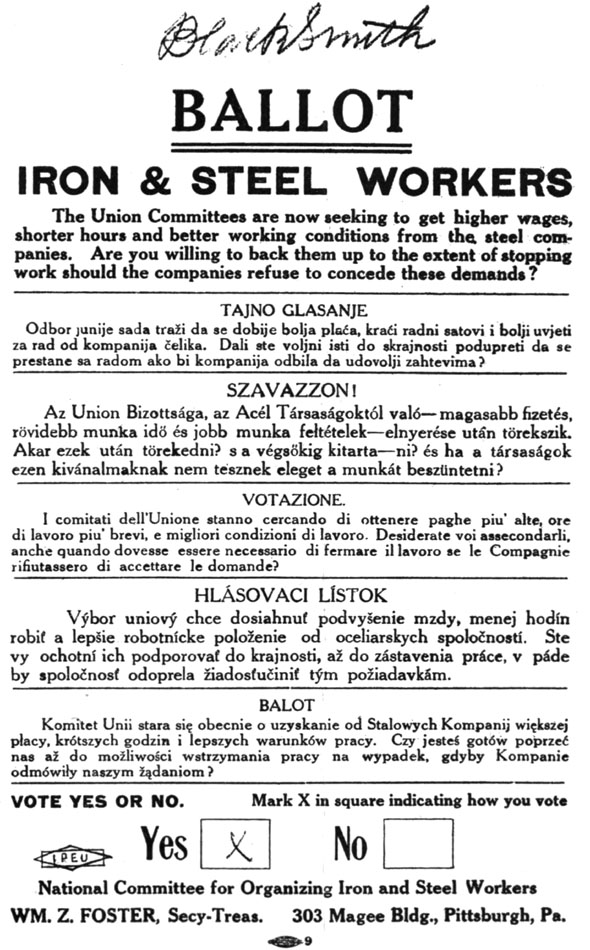
Union voting ballot for whether to go on strike

The AFL then attempted to organize workers on the AA's behalf. The AFL's strategy was twofold. First, the federation would wait for a strong upturn in economic conditions. When workers felt less dependence on their employer and showed signs of restiveness, the organization would initiate an organizing effort. Second, the federation would create staff-driven unions run from national AFL headquarters. Samuel Gompers and other AFL leaders had a nativist view of the unskilled immigrants working in steel plants. Distrusting immigrant workers to manage their own affairs, the AFL intended to run unions for them.

These assumptions doomed the organizing drive. The AFL did not account for the hardening anti-union attitudes of U.S. Steel executives and plant managers, and the federation had no real plan to counterbalance the vast financial resources the company would pour into anti-union espionage, strikebreaking and union avoidance measures. When the AFL did organize a local union, the federation's patronizing attitudes and management style alienated workers and left the local union powerless.

The AFL unions in Chicago in 1918 successfully organized the big meatpackers. The next big target was steel. The AFL formed a National Committee for Organizing the Iron and Steelworkers. It included 24 AFL unions that had a slice of the steel industry. John Fitzpatrick and William Z. Foster of the Chicago Federation of Labor were the committee's leaders. But the organizing drive was hampered by the refusal of many of the participating unions to provide resources and support, and by the committee's lack of a mechanism to enforce jurisdictional agreements and requisition funds. Although the National Committee had some initial success in establishing local steelworker councils, these councils never received formal recognition from the AFL or the AA.

== Strike ==
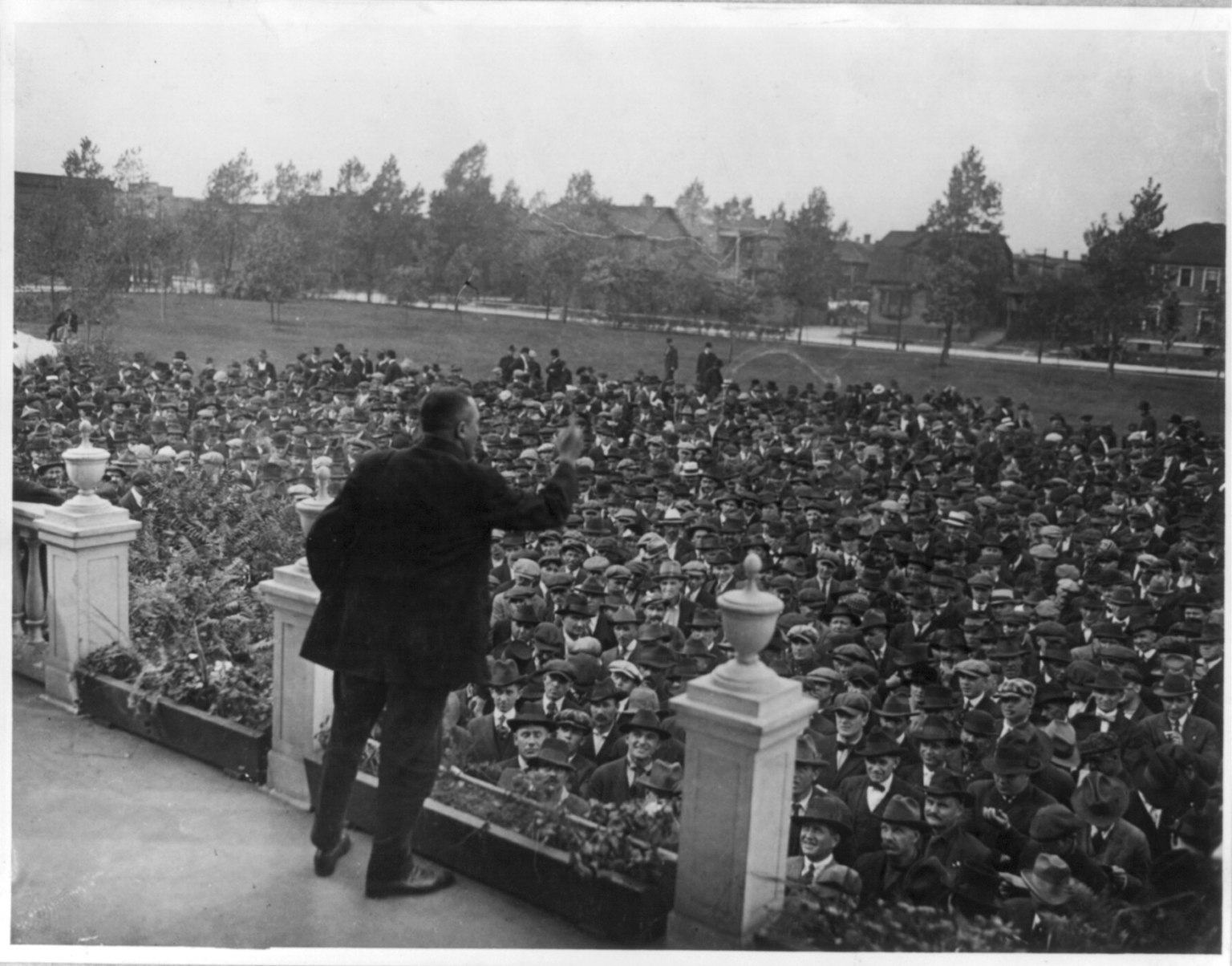
Labor leader rallying striking Steelworkers in Gary, Indiana (1919)

Shortly after Armistice Day, AFL organizers in and around Pittsburgh began to be harassed by the steel companies: permits for meetings were denied, meeting halls could not be rented (when they were, the local Board of Health closed the hall), Pinkerton agents stopped organizers at the train station and forced them to leave town, and literature was seized. The AFL sought assistance from its political allies, but the harassment continued. The anti-union pressure spread to the Midwest and West. As the post-war recession affected the economy, plant managers targeted union supporters and those with large families for dismissal in order to ensure that union efforts were stifled.

The AFL pushed back. On April 1, 1919, thousands of miners in Pennsylvania went on strike to demand that local officials allow union meetings. Terrified town mayors soon issued the required permits. The mass meetings whipped up pro-union sentiment. Steelworkers felt betrayed by the broken promises of employers and the government to keep prices low, raise wages and improve working conditions.

The AFL held a national steelworkers' conference in Pittsburgh on May 25, 1919, to build momentum for an organizing drive but refused to let the workers strike. Disillusioned employees began to abandon the labor movement. The National Committee debated the strike issue through June and July. Worried committee members, seeing their chance for solid membership gains slipping away, agreed to a strike referendum in the mills in August. The response was 98% in favor of a general steelworker strike to begin on September 22, 1919.

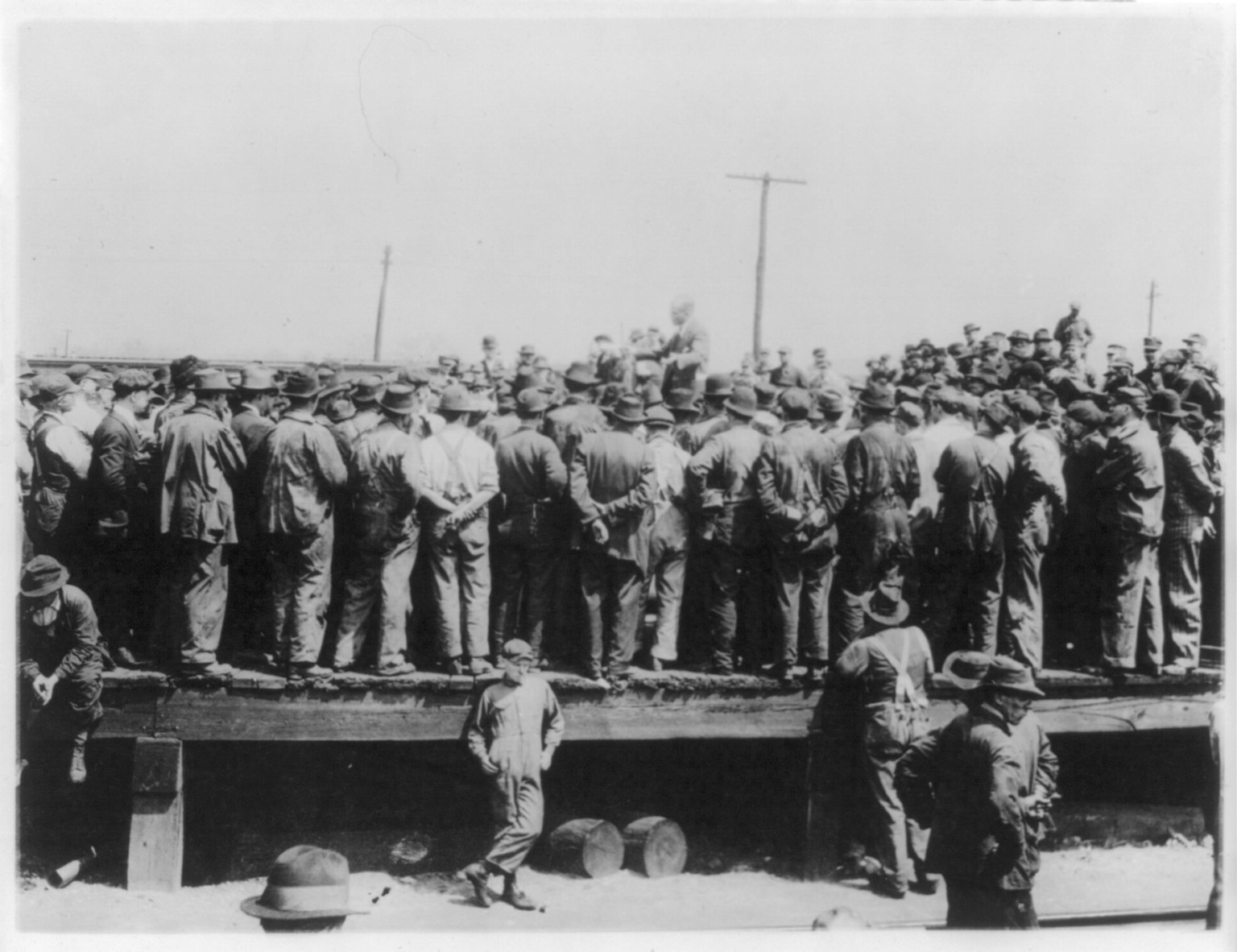
Steelworkers listening to a labor organizer (1919)

As the strike deadline approached, the National Committee attempted to negotiate with U.S. Steel chairman Elbert Gary. The committee also asked for President Woodrow Wilson's help. Telegrams and letters were sent back and forth, but Gary refused to meet, and Wilson – on his ill-fated tour to drum up support for the League of Nations – was unable to influence the company.

The steelworkers carried out their strike threat. The September strike shut down half the steel industry, including almost all mills in Pueblo, Colorado; Chicago, Illinois, Wheeling, West Virginia; Johnstown, Pennsylvania; Cleveland, Ohio; Lackawanna, New York; and Youngstown, Ohio. The steel companies had seriously misjudged the strength of worker discontent.

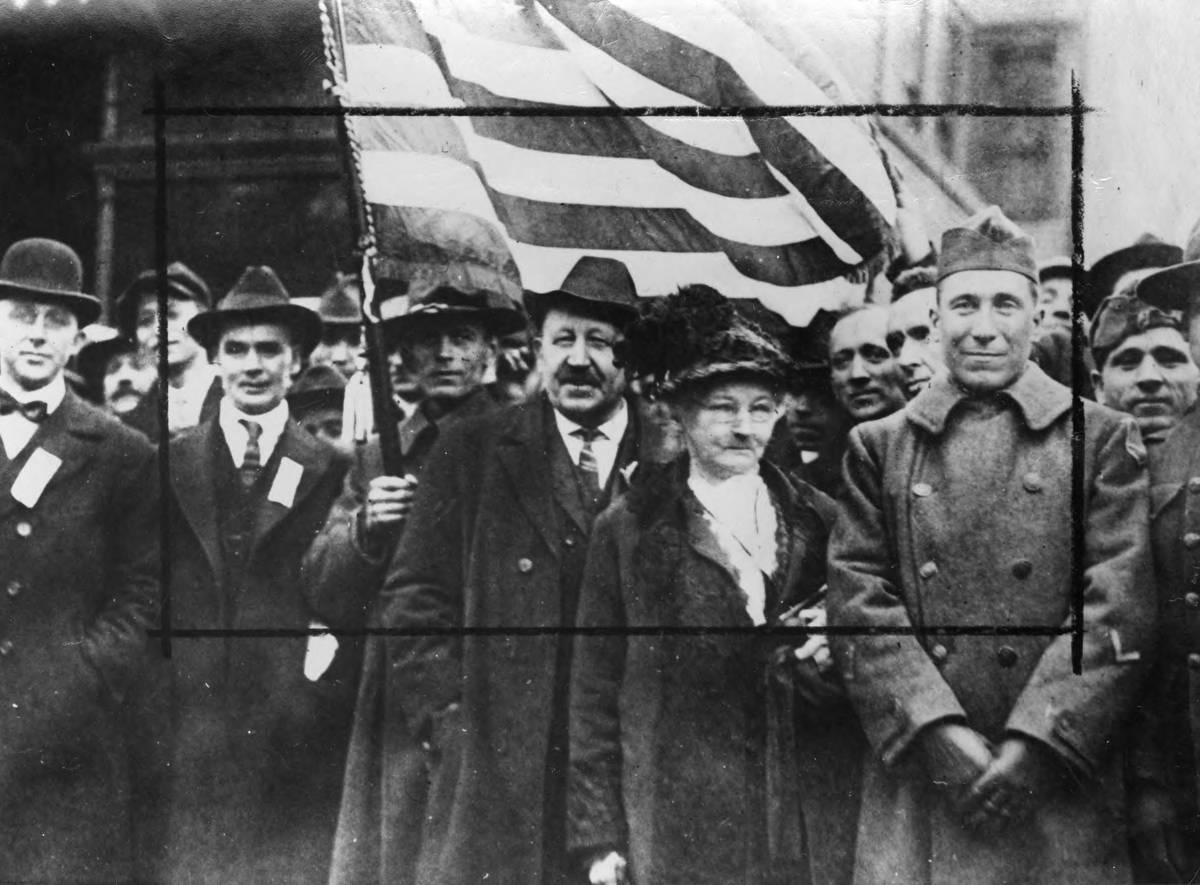
Philip Murray, James H. Maurer, Mother Jones and William Z. Foster surrounded by steel workers and unionists in uniform c. November 1919

But the owners quickly turned public opinion against the AFL. The post-war Red Scare had swept the country in the wake of the Russian revolution of October 1917. The steel companies took eager advantage of the change in the political climate. As the strike began, they published information exposing National Committee co-chairman William Z. Foster's past as a Wobbly and syndicalist, and claimed this was evidence that the steelworker strike was being masterminded by communists and revolutionaries. The steel companies played on nativist fears by noting that a large number of steelworkers were immigrants. Public opinion quickly turned against the striking workers. Only Wilson's stroke on September 26, 1919, prevented government intervention, since Wilson's advisers were loath to take action with the president incapacitated.

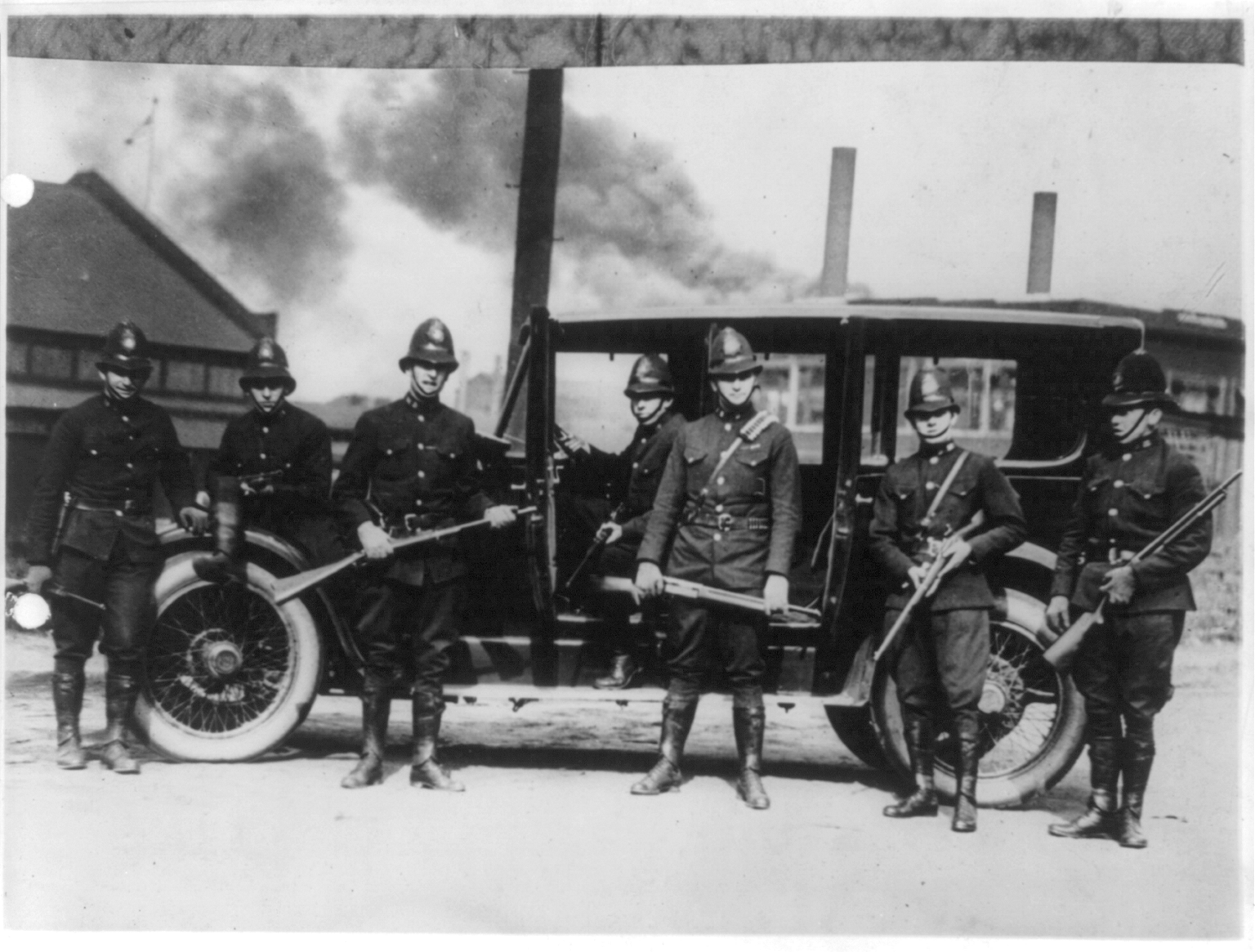
Seven police men posed with riot equipment, preparing for the riot

The federal government's inaction permitted state and local authorities and the steel companies room to maneuver. Mass meetings were prohibited in most strike-stricken areas. Veterans and tradesmen were pressed into service as deputies. The Pennsylvania state police clubbed picketers, dragged strikers from their homes and jailed thousands on flimsy charges. In Delaware, company guards were deputized and threw 100 strikers in jail on fake weapons charges. In Monessen, Pennsylvania, hundreds of men were jailed then were promised release if they agreed to disavow the union and return to work. After strikebreakers and police clashed with unionists in Gary, Indiana, the U.S. Army took over the city on October 6, 1919, and martial law was declared. National guardsmen, leaving Gary after federal troops had taken over, turned their anger on strikers in nearby Indiana Harbor, Indiana.

Steel companies also turned toward strikebreaking and rumor-mongering to demoralize the picketers. Between 30,000 and 40,000 unskilled African-American and Mexican American workers were brought to work in the mills. Company officials played on the racism of many white steelworkers by pointing out how well-fed and happy the black workers seemed now that they had 'white' jobs. Company spies also spread rumors that the strike had collapsed elsewhere, and they pointed to the operating steel mills as proof that the strike had been defeated.

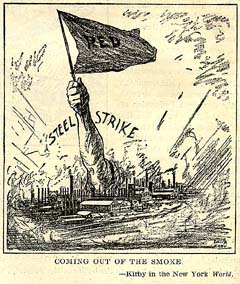
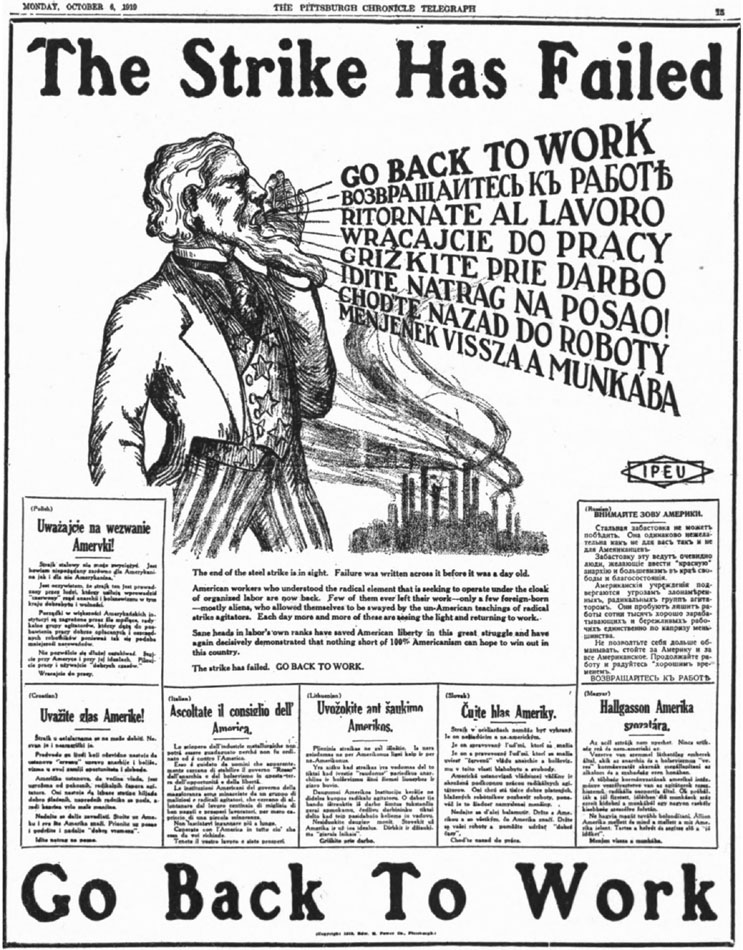
Steel companies used the Red Scare to turn public opinion against the strike, and had friendly papers convince the workers the strike was lost.

The AFL did not provide adequate support. The unions contributed relief funds of $418,000 but it was not enough to help the 300,000 strikers. As October and November wore on, many AA members crossed the picket lines to return to work. AA locals collapsed because of the member infighting this caused. Unions on the National Committee, squabbling over jurisdiction in the steel mills, publicly accused one another of failing to support the strike.

The Great Steel Strike of 1919 collapsed on January 8, 1920. The Chicago mills gave in at the end of October. By the end of November, workers were back at their jobs in Gary, Johnstown, Youngstown and Wheeling. The AA, ravaged by the strike and watching its locals collapse, argued with the National Committee for a unilateral return to work. But the National Committee voted to keep the strike going against the union's wishes.

The strike dragged on in isolated areas like Pueblo and Lackawanna, but the job action decimated the AA. AA president Michael F. Tighe demanded that the National Committee disband; his motion failed. Tighe withdrew from the National Committee. Absent the union with primary jurisdiction over the steel industry, the National Committee ceased operating. The steel strike of 1919 had been a complete rout.

"The Interchurch World Movement," a Protestant group tried to mediate; Gary refused. It then prepared a detailed report that concluded:

The United States Steel Corporation was too big to be beaten by 300,000 workingmen. It had too large a cash surplus, too many allies among other businesses, too much support from government officers, local and national, too strong an influence with social institutions such as the press and the pulpit, it spread over too much of the earth – still retaining absolutely centralized control – to be defeated by widely scattered workers of many minds, many fears, varying states of pocketbook and under a comparatively improvised leadership.

== Media coverage ==
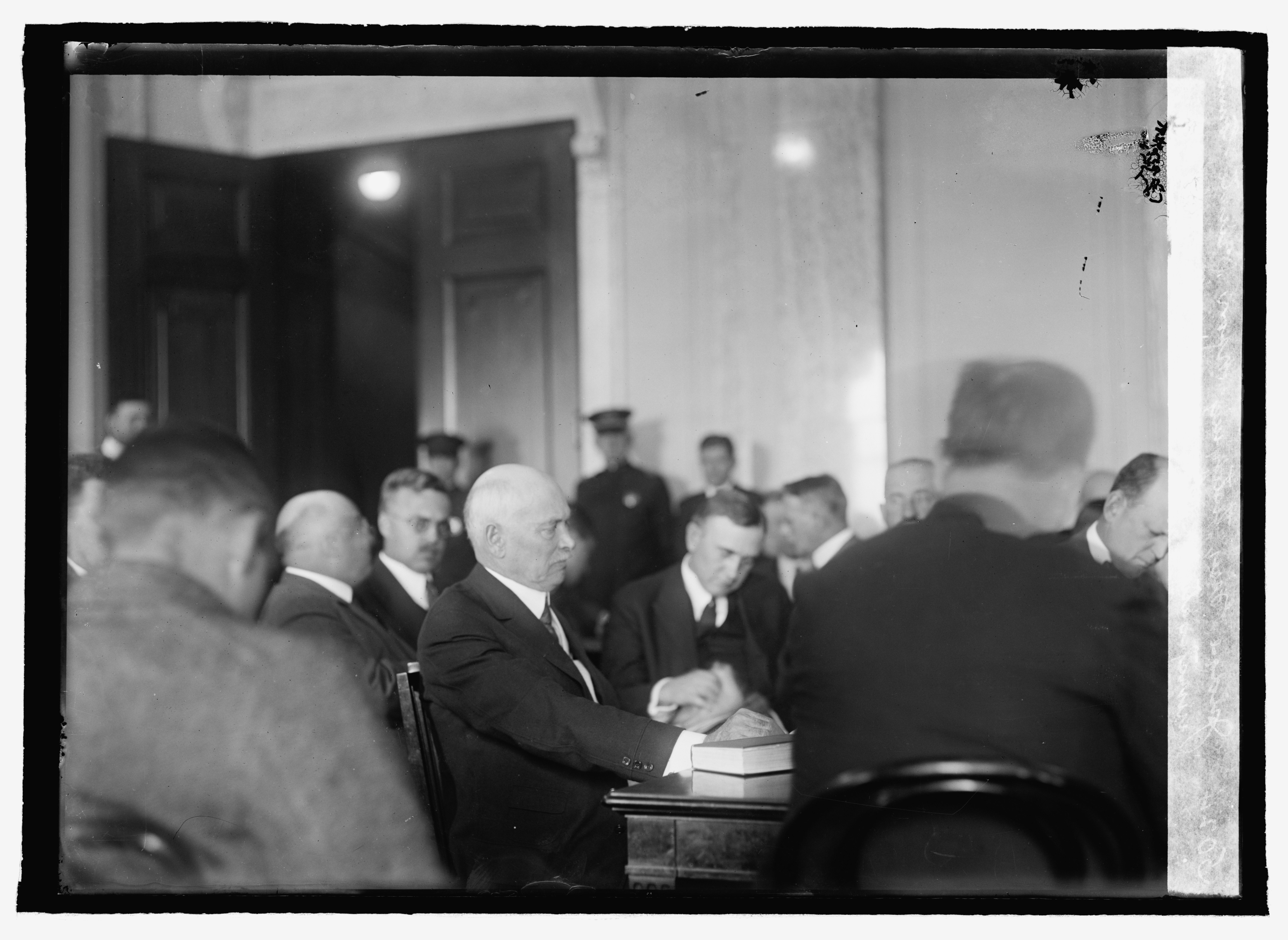
Elbert H. Gary, the chairman of United States Steel testifying before Senate Committee investigating steel strike, October 1919.

The Washington Post printed an opinion that appeared to have gathered the views of businessmen on the strike: "A week's investigation in the steel district has convinced me that an overwhelming majority of the men engaged in it do not want this strike. I get this viewpoint, not from the steel operators, but from the business men of widely scattered communities, from those who are in daily, intimate and sympathetic contact with the working men and from the working men themselves. I have talked with hundreds of them fact to fact. The strike is artificial from top to bottom; it lacks the moral support of the men who are actually on strike, is deplored by those skilled working men who have been thrown out of employment by the strike of the unskilled laborers, and will fall of its own weight if encouragement does not come from high quarters."

That would later be brought up in the testimony of Elbert H. Gary, the chairman of United States Steel, in his testimony before the Committee on Education and Labor of the United States Senate.

== Impact ==
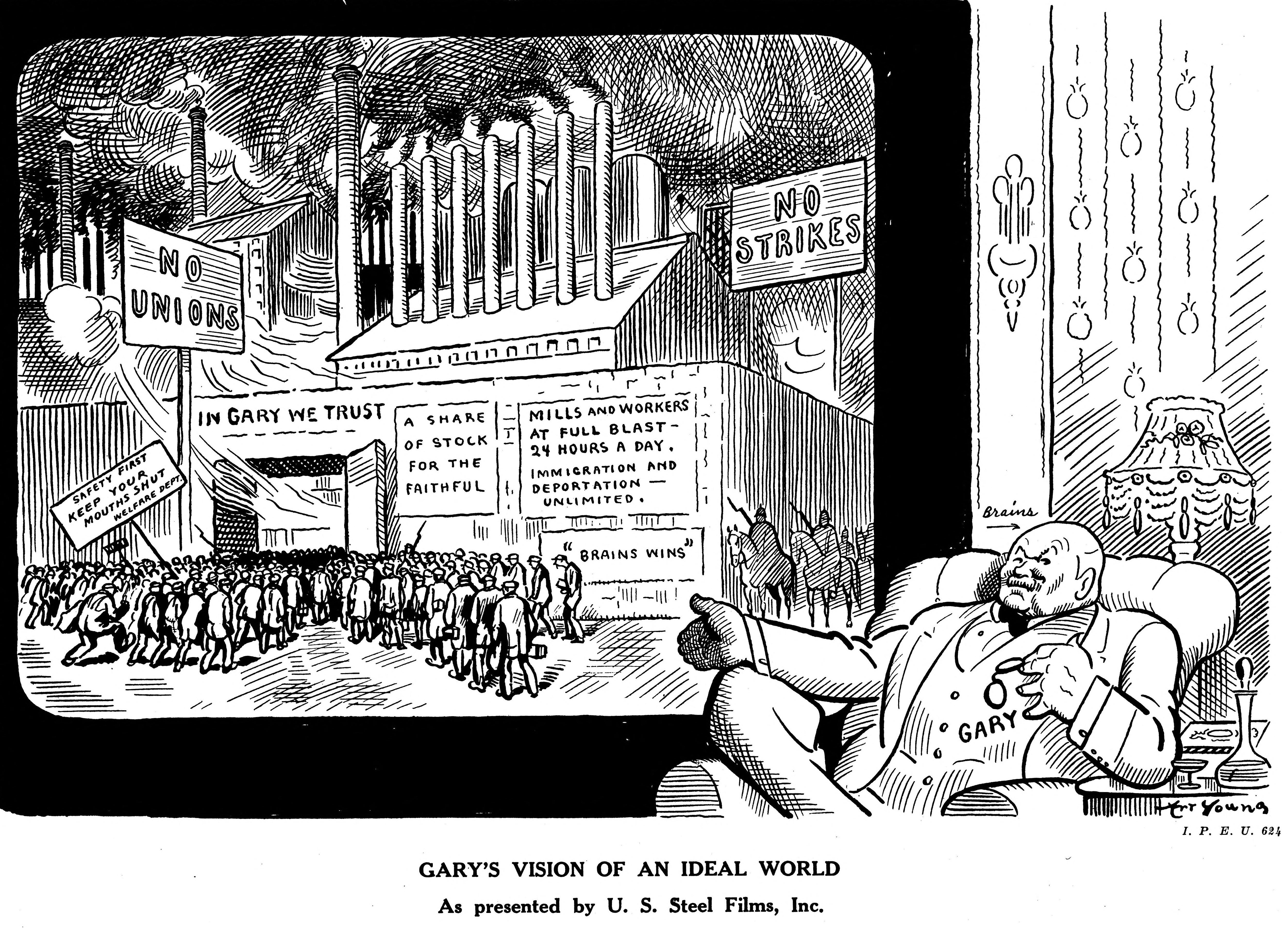
Labor Magazine comic criticizing Elbert H. Gary. 1923

Almost no union organizing in the steel industry occurred in the next 15 years. Advances in technology, such as the development of the wide strip continuous sheet mill, made most of the skilled jobs in steel making obsolete. When the AA considered calling a national strike in 1929 to demand that the new technology be rejected, nearly every AA affiliate returned its charter to the international rather than obey the strike order. By 1930, the AA had only 8,600 members. Its leadership, burned by failed strikes in 1892, 1901 and 1919, turned accommodationist and submissive. The AA, which had only a minor role to play in the steel strike of 1919, remained moribund until the advent of the Steelworkers Organizing Committee in 1936.

== See also ==
- List of worker deaths in United States labor disputes
- US Strike wave of 1919
- UMW General Coal Strike of 1919
- List of US strikes by size

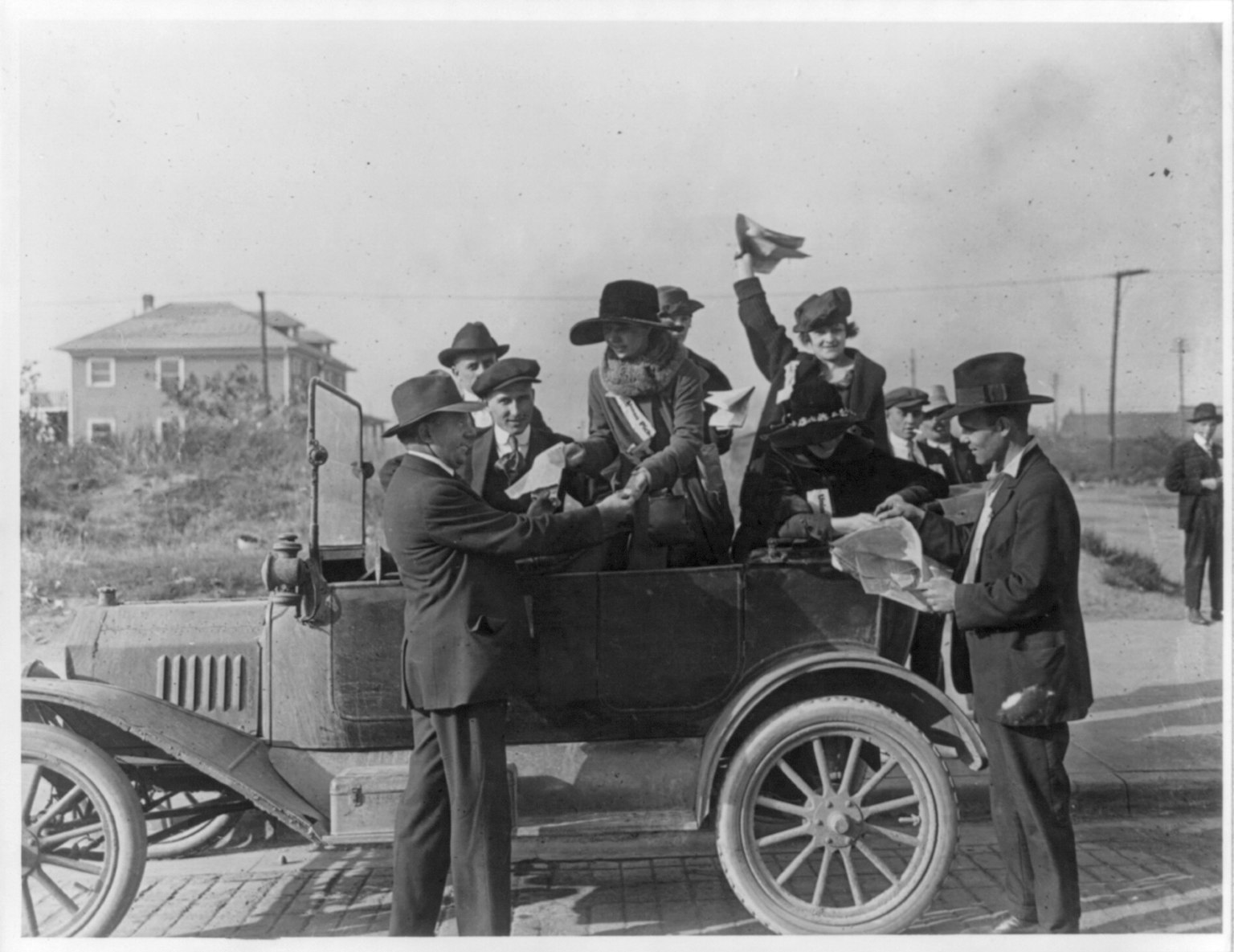
Women steel workers on picket duty on steel mill property, 1919

== Sources and further reading ==
- Brody, David. Labor in crisis: The steel strike of 1919. University of Illinois Press, 1965. online
- Brody, David. Steelworkers in America: The Nonunion Era. (Harvard University Press, 1960). ISBN 0-252-06713-4 online
- Brown, Cliff. "Racial conflict and split labor markets: The AFL campaign to organize steel workers, 1918–1919." Social Science History 22.3 (1998): 319–347.
- Brown, Cliff, and Terry Boswell. "Strikebreaking or solidarity in the great steel strike of 1919: a split labor market, game-theoretic, and QCA analysis." American Journal of Sociology 100.6 (1995): 1479–1519. online
- Brown, Cliff, and John Brueggemann. "Mobilizing interracial solidarity: A comparison of the 1919 and 1937 steel industry labor organizing drives." Mobilization: An International Quarterly 2.1 (1997): 47–70.
- Brown, Ryan C. Pittsburgh and the Great Steel Strike of 1919 (Arcadia Publishing, 2019) online.
- Dubofsky, Melvyn and Dulles, Foster Rhea. Labor in America: A History. 6th ed. Wheeling, IL: Harlan Davidson, Inc., 1999. online ISBN 0-88295-979-4
- Ensley, Philip C. "The interchurch world movement and the steel strike of 1919." Labor History 13.2 (1972): 217–230.
- Ernst, Eldon G. "The Interchurch World Movement and the Great Steel Strike of 1919–1920." Church history 39.2 (1970): 212–223.
- Grystar, Edward. "A Brief Essay on the 1909 and 1919 Steel Strikes in Lyndora." Western Pennsylvania History (1988): 294–300. online
- Murray, Robert K. "Communism and the Great Steel Strike of 1919" The Mississippi Valley Historical Review, Vol. 38, No. 3. (Dec., 1951), pp. 445–466. JSTOR
- Rayback, Joseph G. A History of American Labor. Rev. and exp. ed. New York: MacMillan Publishing Co., Inc., 1966. ISBN 0-02-925850-2
- Stolarik, M. Mark. "Slovak-Americans in the Great Steel Strike." Pennsylvania History 64.3 (1997): 407–418. online
- Taft, Philip. The AF of L. in the Time of Gompers (1957) pp 385–417.

=== Primary sources ===
- Foster, William Z. (1920). The Great Steel Strike and its Lessons. B. W. Huebsch, Inc. online
- Interchurch World Movement of North America. Report on the steel strike of 1919 (1920) online
- Interchurch World Movement. Public opinion and the steel strike; supplementary reports of the investigators to the Commission of Inquiry, the Interchurch World Movement (1921) highly detailed reports on newspapers, towns affected, immigrant groups, ministers, and US Steel. online
- "Troops Stop Meetings; Arrest Nineteen Men, Including Two Labor Union Organizers. Cities Act to Keep Order. Hundreds of Armed Guards, Barbed Wire, and Searchlights Protect the Mills. Both Sides Are Confident. Workers Spend Day MarshalingTheir Forces and Appealing toWorkers to Quit Today. Police Disperse Meeting. Swears in 2,500 Civilian Police. Workers Fail to Report. Keeps Amalgamated in Line. Foster Confident of Victory". The New York Times. September 22, 1919.
- Warne, Colston E., ed. The Steel Strike of 1919 (D.C. Heath, 1963) online
