= UMW coal strike of 1919 =

Month-long union strike in 1919

United Mine Workers coal strike of 1919
- Part of Coal Wars
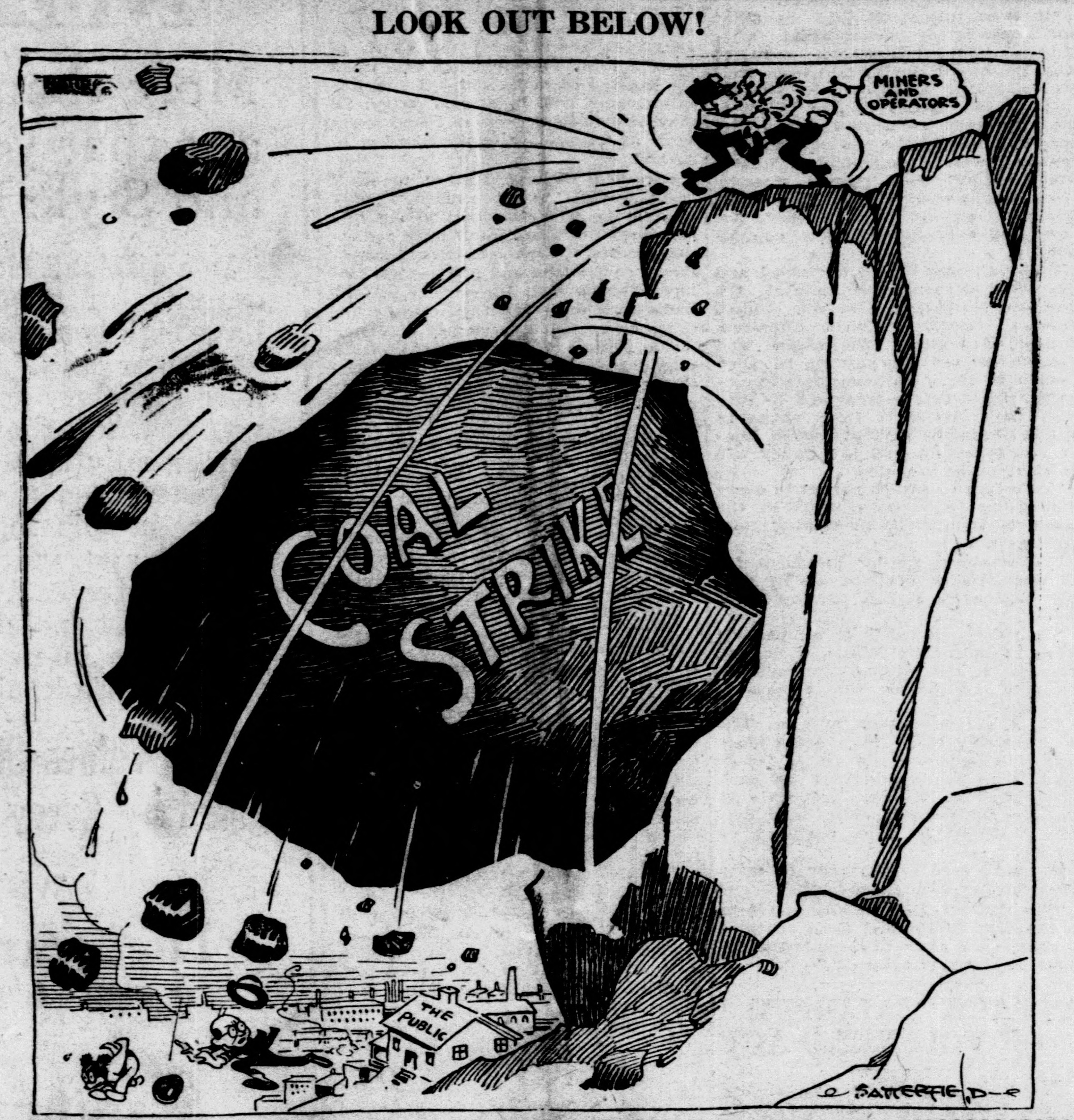
- Bob Satterfield Cartoon about the United Mine Workers coal strike of 1919
- Date: 1 November – 10 December 1919
- Location: United States
- Result: 14% Wage Increase

Parties
United Mine Workers	United States government

Lead figures
John L. Lewis	

Number
394,000 Workers	

The United Mine Workers coal strike of 1919 saw bituminous coal miners strike for over a month, from November 1 to December 10, 1919, for better wages.

== Background ==
1919 in the United States saw the country undergoing the First Red Scare a period marked by a widespread fear of Bolshevism and anarchism, due to real and imagined events; real events included the Russian Revolution and anarchist bombings. At its height in 1919–1920, concerns over the effects of radical political agitation in American society and the alleged spread of communism and anarchism in the American labor movement fueled a general sense of concern. Add to this was the ongoing steel strike of 1919, an attempt by the weakened Amalgamated Association of Iron, Steel and Tin Workers (AA) to organize the United States steel industry in the wake of World War I. The strike had begun on September 22, 1919.

== Coal strike of 1919 ==
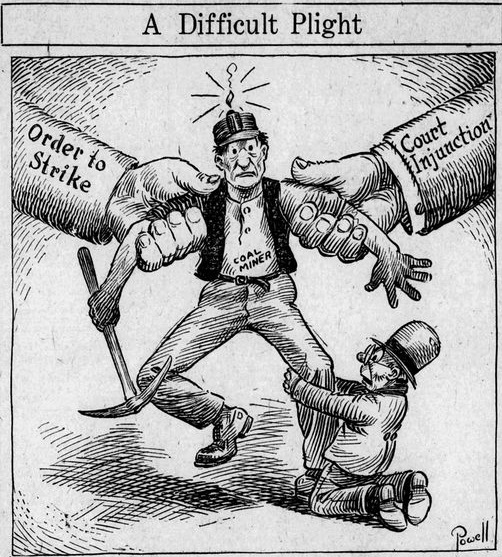
Nov 2, 1919, Omaha Daily Bee

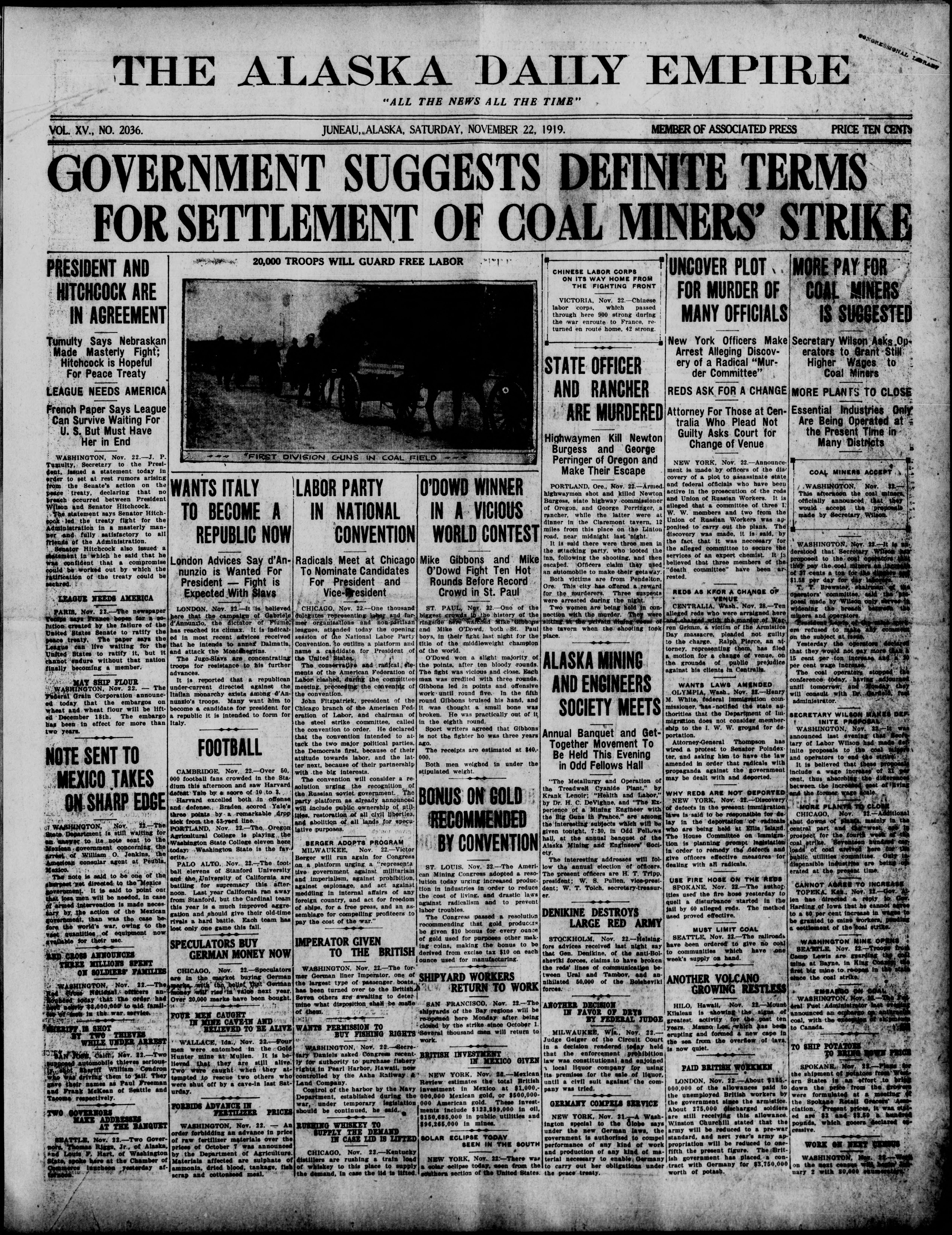
Artillery guns deployed to mines, shown in newspaper -November 22, 1919 Alaska Daily Empire
Caption Reads:

While there are coal deposits in many of the states of the union those shown in the accompanying map are the greats sources of supply and the ones which are affected chiefly by the strike of bituminous miners. Because the Illinois and Ohio miners are better organized than are the miners elsewhere, those states are hardest hit by the strike. Many thousands of non-union miners are still at work, particularly in the fields of Pennsylvania, West Virginia and Utah. The anthracite miners are not affected by the strike

-The Lake County Times, November 4, 1919

The United Mine Workers under John L. Lewis announced a strike for November 1, 1919. They had agreed to a wage agreement to run until the end of World War I and now sought to capture some of their industry's wartime gains. Attorney General A. Mitchell Palmer invoked the Lever Act, a wartime measure that made it a crime to interfere with the production or transportation of necessities. The law, meant to punish hoarding and profiteering, had never been used against a union. Certain of united political backing and almost universal public support, Palmer obtained an injunction on October 31 and 400,000 coal workers struck the next day. He claimed the President authorized the action, following a meeting with the severely ill President in the presence of his doctor. Palmer also asserted that the entire Cabinet had backed his request for an injunction. That infuriated Secretary of Labor Wilson who had opposed Palmer's plan and supported Gompers' view of the President's promises when the Act was under consideration.

The rift between the Attorney General and the Secretary of Labor was never healed, which had consequences the next year when Palmer's attempts to deport radicals were frustrated by the Department of Labor.

On November 2, 1919, the Great Falls Daily Tribune published that around 394,000 bituminous miners out of a total of 615,000 employed by the coal industry were on strike. The miners on strike were based in the following states:

State	Strikers
Arkansas	4,000
Colorado	5,000
Illinois	80,000
Indiana	25,000
Iowa	14,000
Kansas	12,000
Kentucky	10,000
Maryland	10,000
Michigan	2,400
Missouri	2,000
Montana	4,000
New Mexico	4,000
Ohio	40,000
Oklahoma	7,000
Pennsylvania	100,000
Tennessee	2,000
Texas	2,500
Utah	1,000
Washington	6,000
West Virginia	40,000
Wyoming	8,000

Samuel Gompers, President of the American Federation of Labor, protested that President Wilson and members of his Cabinet had provided assurances when the Act was passed that it would not be used to prevent strikes by labor unions. He provided detailed accounts of his negotiations with representatives of the administration, especially Secretary of Labor William B. Wilson. He also argued that the end of hostilities, even in the absence of a signed treaty, should have invalidated any attempts to enforce the Act's provisions. Nevertheless, he attempted to mediate between Palmer and Lewis, but after several days called the injunction "so autocratic as to stagger the human mind".

The coal operators smeared the strikers with charges that Lenin and Trotsky had ordered the strike and were financing it, and some of the press echoed that language. Others used words like "insurrection" and "Bolshevik revolution". Eventually Lewis, facing criminal charges and sensitive to the propaganda campaign, withdrew his strike call, though many strikers ignored his action.

As the strike dragged on into its third week, coal supplies were running low and public sentiment was calling for ever stronger government action. The final agreement came on December 10. The deal amounted to a 14% wage increase as well as an appointment of an investigatory commission to continue the exploration of the wage issue. The agreement was signed by John L. Lewis, John Brophy and other officials, and called on the miners to return to work.

== See also ==
- List of miners' strikes
- List of US strikes by size
- Steel strike of 1919
- UMW General coal strike (1922)
- UK National coal strike of 1912

== Bibliography ==
Notes

References

- Ackerman, Kenneth (2011). Young J. Edgar: Hoover and the Red Scare, 1919–1920. Viral History Press. ISBN 9781619450011. - Total pages: 467
- Coben, Stanley (1963). A. Mitchell Palmer: Politician. Columbia University Press. - Total pages: 351
- Daniels, Josephus (2018). The Wilson Era: Years of War and After, 1917–1923. UNC Press Books. ISBN 9781469643977. - Total pages: 738
- "394,000 Miners Striking; 4,000 are in Montana". Great Falls Daily Tribune. Great Falls, Cascade, Montana. November 2, 1919. pp. 1–40. ISSN 2378-833X. OCLC 11299783.
- Marcus, Dr. Irwin M.; Mountjoy, Eileen; O'Leary, Beth (2019). "The coal strike of 1919 in Indiana County and its aftermath". Indiana University of Pennsylvania.
- Murray, Robert K. (1955). Red Scare: A Study in National Hysteria, 1919–1920. University of Minnesota Press. ISBN 9780816658336. - Total pages: 352
- "Palmer to Enforce Law". The New York Times. November 1, 1919. ISSN 0362-4331. OCLC 1645522.
- "Gompers Repeats Injunction Charge". The New York Times. November 23, 1919. ISSN 0362-4331. OCLC 1645522.
- "Miners Finally Agree". The New York Times. December 11, 1919. ISSN 0362-4331. OCLC 1645522.
