= Amalgamated Association of Iron and Steel Workers =

Former American steelworkers union (1876–1942)

AA
- Amalgamated Association of Iron and Steel Workers
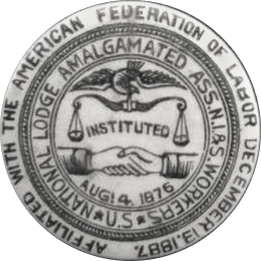
- Predecessor: Sons of Vulcan; Ass. Brotherhood of Iron & Steel Heaters, Rollers, & Roughers; Iron and Steel Roll Hands of US
- Merged into: United Steelworkers (1942)
- Founded: August 4, 1876
- Location: U.S.
- Members: 150,000 (February 1934)
- Affiliations: Congress of Industrial Organizations, Steel Workers Organizing Committee

Amalgamated Association of Iron and Steel Workers (AA) was an American labor union formed in 1876 to represent iron and steel workers. It partnered with the Steel Workers Organizing Committee of the CIO, in November 1935. Both organizations disbanded May 22, 1942, to form a new organization, the United Steelworkers.

== The Homestead strike ==
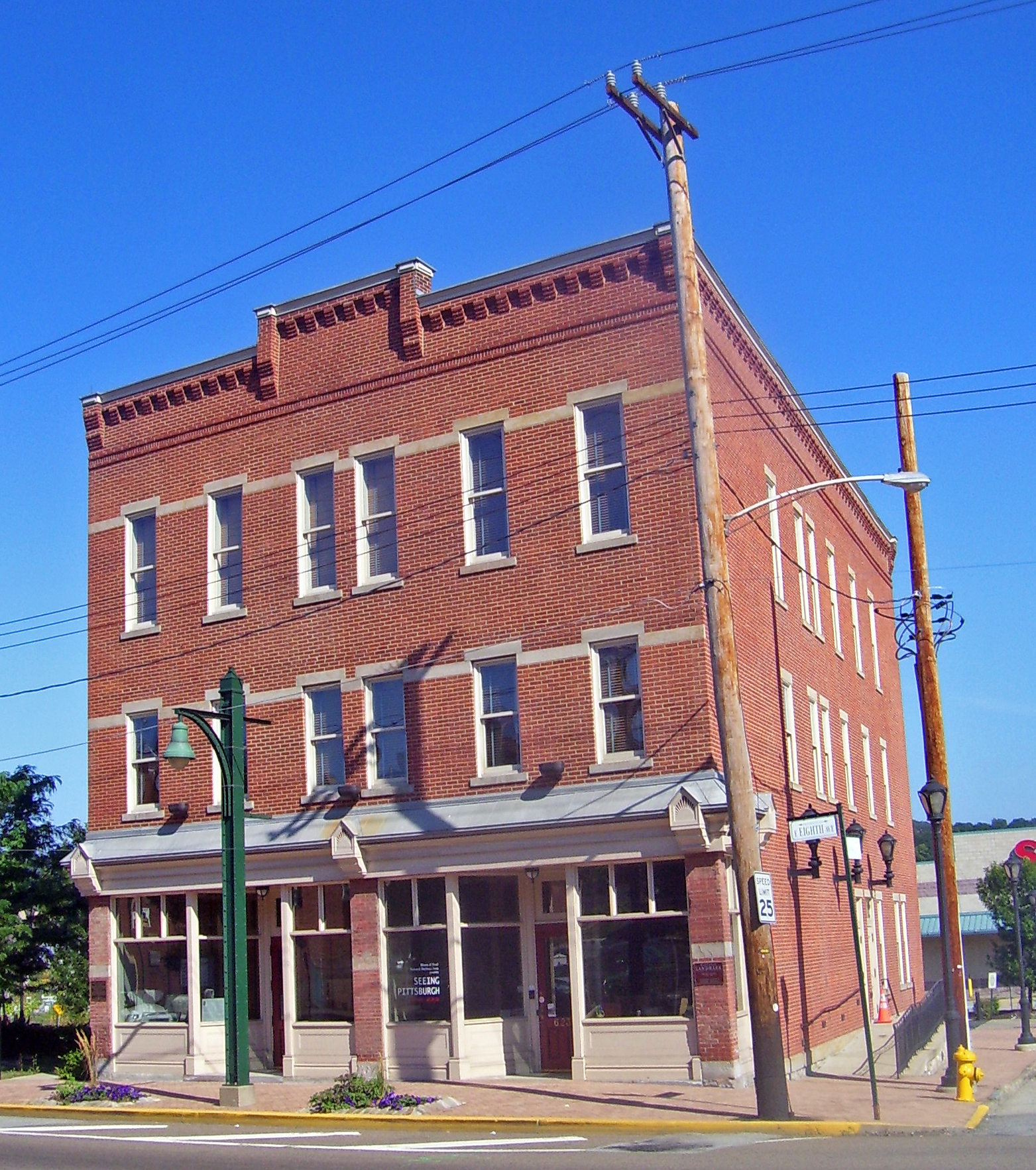
The Bost Building in Homestead, Pennsylvania, was used as the headquarters of the association during the Homestead Strike. It is now a National Historic Landmark for its association with the strike.

The Homestead strike was a major turning point for the union.

Andrew Carnegie placed strong anti-unionist Henry Clay Frick in charge of his company's operations in 1881. With the union's contract due to expire on June 30, 1892, Frick demanded a 22 percent wage decrease, then unilaterally announced that if an agreement was not reached, he would no longer recognize the union.

Frick locked the workers out on June 29. The striking workers ringed the plant and patrolled the Monongahela River (which ran alongside the mill) to prevent anyone from entering. Local sheriff's deputies failed to retake the plant on July 5.

Frick then sent 300 Pinkerton National Detective Agency guards to seize the plant and re-open it on the night of July 5. The Pinkerton men were ordered to approach the plant from the river, but the strikers learned of the Pinkertons' arrival. The Pinkertons attempted to land at about 4 a.m., and the crowd surged onto the Homestead plant grounds. A shot was fired, resulting in both sides opening fire. Two workers and two Pinkertons died and dozens were wounded. The Pinkerton tugboat departed with the wounded agents, leaving the remaining agents stranded.

The strikers continued to sporadically fire on the stranded barges, and an attempt was made to sink the barges with a cannon. When the Pinkertons tried to disembark again at 8:00 a.m., a firefight broke out and four more strikers were killed. The strikers attempted to burn the barges several times during the day, but failed. At 5:00 p.m., the Pinkertons surrendered and were handed over to the sheriff.

On July 9, despite union claims that law and order had been restored, Governor Robert E. Pattison ordered the state militia to seize the town. More than 8,000 militia arrived on July 12, and within 90 minutes company officials were back in their offices. Strike leaders were charged with conspiracy, riot, murder and treason.

On July 23, anarchist Alexander Berkman attempted to assassinate Frick, wounding him but not fatally. Public support for the strike evaporated, and large numbers of strikers began crossing the picket line over the following months.

The AA was nearly bankrupted by the job action, and voted to return to work on November 20, 1892. In February 1893, the company and the union agreed to drop the charges filed against one another.

== 1901 organizing drive at U.S. Steel ==
The Homestead strike affected the AA nationwide. The Joliet Iron and Steel Company, the Jones and Laughlin Steel Company, the St. Louis Wire Mill Company, the Edgar Thomson Steel Works and the Duquesne works all refused to sign contracts with the AA while the Homestead labor action lingered. A deepening in 1889 of the Long Depression led most steel companies to seek wage decreases similar to those imposed at Homestead.

In 1893, Carnegie defeated an AA union drive at the Duquesne steelworks. In 1885, Carnegie ousted the AA at the Edgar Thomson works.

An organizing drive at the Homestead plant in 1896 was crushed by Frick. In May 1899, 300 Homestead workers successfully formed a lodge, but Frick ordered the Homestead works shut down and the unionization effort collapsed. Carnegie Steel remained nonunionized.

De-unionization efforts throughout the Midwest began in 1897 when Jones and Laughlin Steel refused to sign a contract. By 1900, not a single steel plant in Pennsylvania remained unionized. The AA presence in Ohio and Illinois continued for a few more years, but the union continued to collapse. Many lodges disbanded, their members disillusioned. Others were easily broken in short, desultory battles. Carnegie Steel's Mingo Junction, Ohio, plant was the last major unionized steel mill, in the north and east, but it, too, broke the AA and withdrew recognition in 1903. There was however a medium-sized mill in Granite City, IL (Granite City Steel) that continued to have active AA lodges from the late 1890s until SWOC was founded. This plant became part of National Steel Corp. until its assets were sold to U.S. Steel in bankruptcy. The Granite City plant remains the oldest operating integrated mill in North America (and probably in the Western Hemisphere).

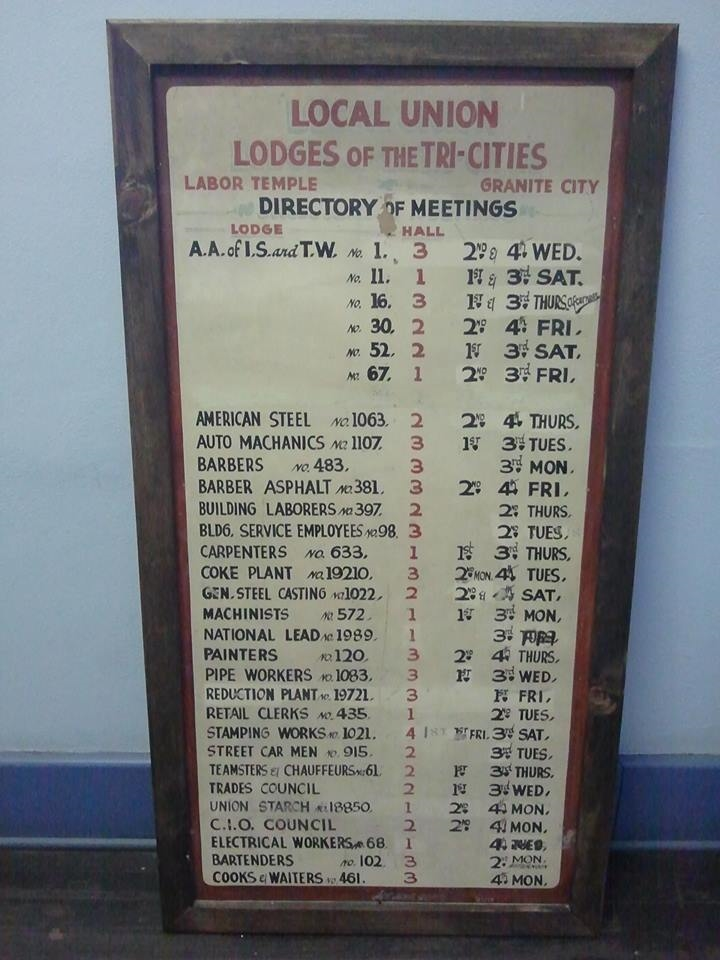
This sign was at the ground floor entrance to the Labor Temple in Granite City, IL. Note the AAIST Lodge Numbers at the top. These were all located at Granite City Steel. Electrical Workers 68 was also at that plant. In 1936 all those units joined SWOC and subsequently in 1942 they became part of the Steelworkers. Lodges 16, 30 and 67 existed until 2003 when they were part of a merger that included the O&T local 9325 and the Security local 4063 to create a new local 1899 (because evidence existed of a union since at least that year). They are arguably the oldest continuously existing steel local unions in the U.S.

=== Search for growth ===
AA membership sagged to 10,000 in 1894 from its high of over 24,000 in 1891. A year later, it was down to 8,000. By 1909, it had sunk to 6,300.

The collapse of the AA in the steel industry was due not only to the shock of the loss at Homestead, but by changing conditions in the steel industry. So long as steel, like iron smelting, remained a craft-like endeavor, the AA – with the allegiance of each plant's skilled workers – could control the industry. But as the steel industry mechanized, the skills needed to manufacture steel shrank. Inexperienced workers could learn the unskilled work quickly. Steel manufacturers also realized that having multi-plant operations meant that production could continue if the union struck a particular facility.

Although the AA lost nearly all its members in the steel industry, the union continued to maintain its presence in the iron industry.

The AA looked for growth, however, in the tin industry, which still required skilled workers. By 1900, the union had organized 75 percent of the sheet metal mills and all but one of the tin mills in the country. That year, the union changed its name to the Amalgamated Association of Iron, Steel and Tin Workers.

=== Crisis of the trusts ===
But the AA seriously misjudged the economics of the tin industry. A sheet metal trust formed in 1900 which brought nonunion plants into competition with the AA's unionized facilities at the American Sheet Steel Company. The company refused to recognize the AA and idled union plants while keeping nonunion works running at full speed.

The formation of the U.S. Steel trust in 1901 threatened the AA with ruin. The trust incorporated plants of the American Tin Plate Co. into U.S Steel. If the AA was to save its existing locals at American Tin Plate and American Sheet Steel, it had to organize all the plants of U.S. Steel. But before an organizing drive could get under way, U.S. Steel's tin plate subsidiary withdrew recognition from the AA and refused to bargain at unionized plants. The independent American Sheet Steel did the same.

=== Recognition strike at U.S. Steel ===
The AA tried to organize U.S. Steel by staging a recognition strike. U.S. Steel executives pressured American Sheet Steel executives into recognizing the AA at most Sheet Steel plants on July 13, 1901. But AA president T.J. Shaffer rejected the deal because it did not cover all American Sheet Steel plants.

U.S. Steel president J.P. Morgan then backed out of the deal.

The strike failed. U.S. Steel and American Sheet Steel workers refused to leave work, both companies hired thousands of strikebreakers, and the AFL refused to support the AA financially or organizationally. The strike against U.S. Steel ended on September 14.

== Aftermath of the U.S. Steel strike ==
The AA never recovered from the U.S. Steel strike. It turned strongly conservative, hoping through submissiveness and cooperation to maintain its few remaining contracts. U.S. Steel slowly dismantled AA unions in its plants.

The puddlers in the union's ironworker locals attempted to secede in 1907. Angered at the union's decline and the way national leaders ignored their interests, the puddlers had retained membership throughout the battles with Carnegie and U.S. Steel. Adopting their old Sons of Vulcan name, about 1,250 of the AA's 2,250 puddlers left the union. But the secession did not last. The Sons of Vulcan won recognition from the Lockhart Iron and Steel Company of McKees Rocks, Pennsylvania. But when the new union demanded a massive wage hike in 1910, the union was forced to strike. After the successful strike, fights broke out between returning union members and strikebreakers who had stayed in the plant. The company slowly replaced all the strikers. Weakened, the Sons of Vulcan soon lost recognition at Youngstown Sheet and Tube, and at the A.M. Byers ironworks. The secessionists slowly drifted back into the AA.

On June 1, 1909, U.S. Steel finally withdrew recognition of the AA at the 12 remaining unionized mills. While the union's larger locals, such as those at Youngstown Sheet and Tube and the LaBelle Iron Works, disbanded without a fight, most of the union's smaller affiliates fought back. A strike was called. The AFL began a national campaign to publicize dangerous working conditions in the company's plants and the monopolistic nature of the trust. U.S. Steel aggressively countered, breaking up union meetings with hired thugs, driving organizers out of town, bringing in strikebreakers and shifting production to other plants. Although the AA flirted with bankruptcy, donations from other unions kept it afloat. The strike dragged on for 14 months, and was broken in December 1910.

In 1911, the AA was unable to win wage increases among independent steel employers to match those unilaterally bestowed by U.S. Steel.

The depression of 1915 forced sizeable wage decreases on the union. The union, which had once organized nearly every tin and sheet metal plant in the country, now could count less than one-fifth under contract. Once the largest affiliate of the AFL, now the AA numbered a mere 6,500 members.

Blacklisting of union members and supporters and the common use of yellow-dog contracts became widespread, hindering the union.

== Post-war activism ==
Faced with declining membership, the AA amended its constitution in 1910 and offered membership to all iron and steel workers. Few took the union up on its offer.

In 1909, AA president P.J. McArdle won approval for an AFL organizing drive at U.S. Steel, but the drive never got off the ground.

During World War I, the AA saw some limited growth. The AFL formed a National Committee for Organizing the Iron and Steel Workers to take advantage of worker restiveness. More than 15 AFL unions participated in the committee, while 24 claimed jurisdiction over portions of the steel industry. John Fitzpatrick and William Z. Foster of the Chicago Federation of Labor became the committee leaders. But the organizing drive was hampered by the refusal of many of the participating unions to provide resources and support, and by the committee's lack of a mechanism to enforce jurisdictional agreements and requisition funds.

A shoving match between the AFL and the steel companies led to the next major push to organize the steel industry.

=== 1919 steel strike ===
Shortly after Armistice Day, AFL organizers in and around Pittsburgh began to be harassed. The anti-union pressure quickly spread to the Midwest and West.

The AFL pushed back with a national strike. On April 1, 1919, miners in Pennsylvania struck to demand that local officials allow union meetings, and frightened town mayors soon issued meeting permits. The success of the miners' strike led the AA to hold a strike referendum in August in which 98 percent of its members favored a general steelworker strike to begin September 21.

The September strike shut down half the steel industry.

But the owners quickly turned public opinion against the AFL. A Red Scare had swept the United States in the wake of the Russian revolution of October 1917. The steel companies took advantage of the change in the political climate, publishing articles exposing Foster's past as a Wobblie and syndicalist. The steel companies also played heavily on nativist hatreds and implied that immigrant steelworkers were communists.

The use of state-sponsored violence against the union was widespread. President Woodrow Wilson's stroke, however, prevented federal officials from meeting steelmakers' demands to use federal troops to put down the strike. State and local authorities did intervene and encouraged the use of widespread violence against the union. State militia violence was so bad that the U.S. Army was forced to occupy Gary, Indiana.

Steel companies turned toward strikebreaking and rumor-mongering to break the strike. Tens of thousands of African American and Mexican workers were brought in as strikebreakers, and many racist white steelworkers returned to work to stop minorities from taking their jobs.

The AFL refused to contribute funds or staff to support the strike. By November, most AA local affiliates had collapsed.

The Steel strike of 1919 collapsed on January 8, 1920. AA officials begged the National Committee to approve a unilateral return to work, but National Committee members voted to keep the strike going. The AA withdrew from the National Committee, and the organizing effort and strike ended.

== New Deal organizing ==
By mid-1933, the Great Depression and conservative leadership had left the AA with only 5,000 members and less than $30,000 in cash. Union president Michael F. Tighe, 76, was referred to as 'Grandmother' due to his advanced age and timidity.

Passage of the National Industrial Recovery Act on June 16, 1933, sparked widespread union organizing throughout the country. Even the AA attempted to organize workers. An organizing drive at Jones and Laughlin Steel saw more than 6,000 workers sign membership cards. A similar drive at the U.S. Steel works in nearby Duquesne in late 1933 enrolled one-quarter of the mill's unskilled workforce, mostly immigrants and blacks.

The AA's membership rose to more than 150,000 by February 1934. Nearly one in two steelworkers had signed a union authorization card (although they had not become dues-paying members).

Strike activity, too, soared. Steel strikes affected the same proportion of the industry as strikes did strikes in the rubber and auto industries. The number of striking steel workers jumped from none in 1932 to 34,000 in 1933. Roughly 75 percent of the workers were fighting for recognition of their union.

Tighe denounced the strikes and resented the way new members seized control of the lodges.

=== Rank and File Movement ===
In 1934, an opposition group known as the Rank and File Movement formed within the AA. A number of militant local affiliates had sprung up across the nation or had joined existing lodges in large enough numbers to elect their own, militant leaders. The locals coalesced into the Rank and File Movement and challenged the conservative leadership to act, demanding that the AA reorganize along industrial union lines. At the AA national convention in late April, the Rank and File Movement forced through a resolution which committed the international to a nationwide strike on June 16, 1934, if the major steel employers did not recognize the union in every plant.

Meanwhile, the federal regulatory scheme under which the AA had been organizing began to collapse. The National Labor Board (NLB), which attempted to enforce Section 7(a) of the NIRA, lacked the powers necessary to enforce the act, and employers had begun to ignore the Board and violate the law. Senator Robert F. Wagner, co-author of the NIRA, had begun to write new legislation in the fall of 1933 to more fully lay out the rights of workers in the U.S. and establish a new agency to enforce these rights. Wagner introduced his legislation on March 1, 1934.

Simultaneously, a fight was brewing between the United Auto Workers (UAW) and the auto industry. The UAW had organized nearly 50,000 auto workers in 1933, but the auto manufacturers had refused to recognize the union, established company unions and rejected the NLB's call for mediation. Roosevelt had personally intervened in the dispute. In an agreement applauded by the AFL, Roosevelt stripped the NLB of its jurisdiction over the auto industry and established a separate Automobile Labor Board.

The March 1934 auto industry agreement paved the way for new legislation which did away with the toothless NLB, but which only worsened the problems of the labor movement. With the steel strike deadline approaching, the steel industry was gearing up for war with the AA. The Wagner bill, which might have averted a strike by establishing stronger protections for workers, had little chance of passing. Again Roosevelt intervened. He called a conference at the White House on June 12 at which AFL president William Green was one of the attendees. A compromise bill was hammered out which authorized the president to create one or more new labor boards to enforce Section 7(a) by conducting investigations, subpoenaing evidence and witnesses, holding elections and issuing enforcement orders.

At a special convention of the AA on June 13, Green convinced the AA to call the strike off. The Rank and File Movement's inadequate organization, the obstructionist policies of the Amalgamated's national leadership, strong opposition from the steel industry and the promise of enhanced governmental protection cut the legs out from the nascent organizing drive. Tighe exacted his revenge: Throughout the rest of the year, he suspended locals that called for aggressive action.

=== AFL attempts to organize ===
At its annual convention in San Francisco in October 1934, Green called for an organizing campaign in the steel industry. But no organizing drive in steel emerged. Only Green and two other AFL vice presidents supported the plan, the AFL executive council voted to initiate a joint organizing drive similar to the failed 1919 campaign.

By early 1935, what little organizing the AA had exhibited in the steel industry melted away. When the U.S. Supreme Court struck down the NIRA on constitutional ground on May 27, 1935, the AFL's organizing drive collapsed.

== Merger with SWOC ==
Other events swiftly overtook the AA. The National Labor Relations Act was signed into law by President Roosevelt on July 5, 1935. Committee for Industrial Organization (CIO) formed within the AFL on November 8, 1935.

The CIO wanted to start a steel organizing campaign. But John L. Lewis and the CIO did not wish to leave the AFL, however, so the CIO resolved to work through the AA instead. The CIO attempted to push a steelworker industrial organizing plan for the AA through the January 1936 AFL executive council meeting, but the plan was rejected.

The CIO subverted the AA from within. John Brophy, the newly hired organizing director of the CIO, was able to infiltrate the AA convention and proposed that the delegates accept the CIO's offer. The delegates agreed to appoint a committee to study the proposal.

Tighe sent AA international secretary Louis Leonard to consult with Green, but Green could not match the CIO's offer. Lewis made it clear that the CIO would move ahead with an organizing drive in the steel industry with or without the AA. Confronted with a choice between irrelevance or collusion, AA officials accepted the CIO proposal, affiliated with the CIO on June 4, and agreed to make the AA an administrative unit of CIO's Steel Workers Organizing Committee (SWOC). SWOC was formally announced in Pittsburgh on June 7, 1936. Green was outraged, the AFL suspended the 10 unions which belonged to the CIO in November 1936. Philip Murray was appointed director of SWOC, and ran the organization (and union) until his death in 1952.

== The AA under SWOC ==
For the next six years, the AA remained inactive within SWOC. It issued charters and approved contracts for existing lodges, but let SWOC handle all matters regarding organizing and to negotiate contracts on behalf of new locals.

SWOC and the AA were disbanded at a convention held in Cleveland, Ohio, on May 22, 1942. A new organization, the United Steel Workers of America (USWA), was founded. Philip Murray was named president. David J. McDonald, Murray's long-time aide at SWOC, was appointed the first secretary-treasurer of the USWA.

== Leadership ==
=== Presidents ===
1878: Joseph Bishop
1880: John Jarrett
1883: William Weihe
1892: W. M. Garland
1897: Theodore Schaffer
1905: Peter J. McArdle
1911: John Williams
1919: Michael F. Tighe
1937: Frank Bennett

=== Secretary-Treasurers ===
1878: William Martin
1890: Stephen Madden
1892: John Kilgallan
1897: Stephen Madden
1898: John Williams
1911: Michael F. Tighe
1919: Fred H. Keightley
1920s: David J. Davis
1932: Louis Leonard
