= U.S. Steel recognition strike of 1901 =

Attempted nationwide strike

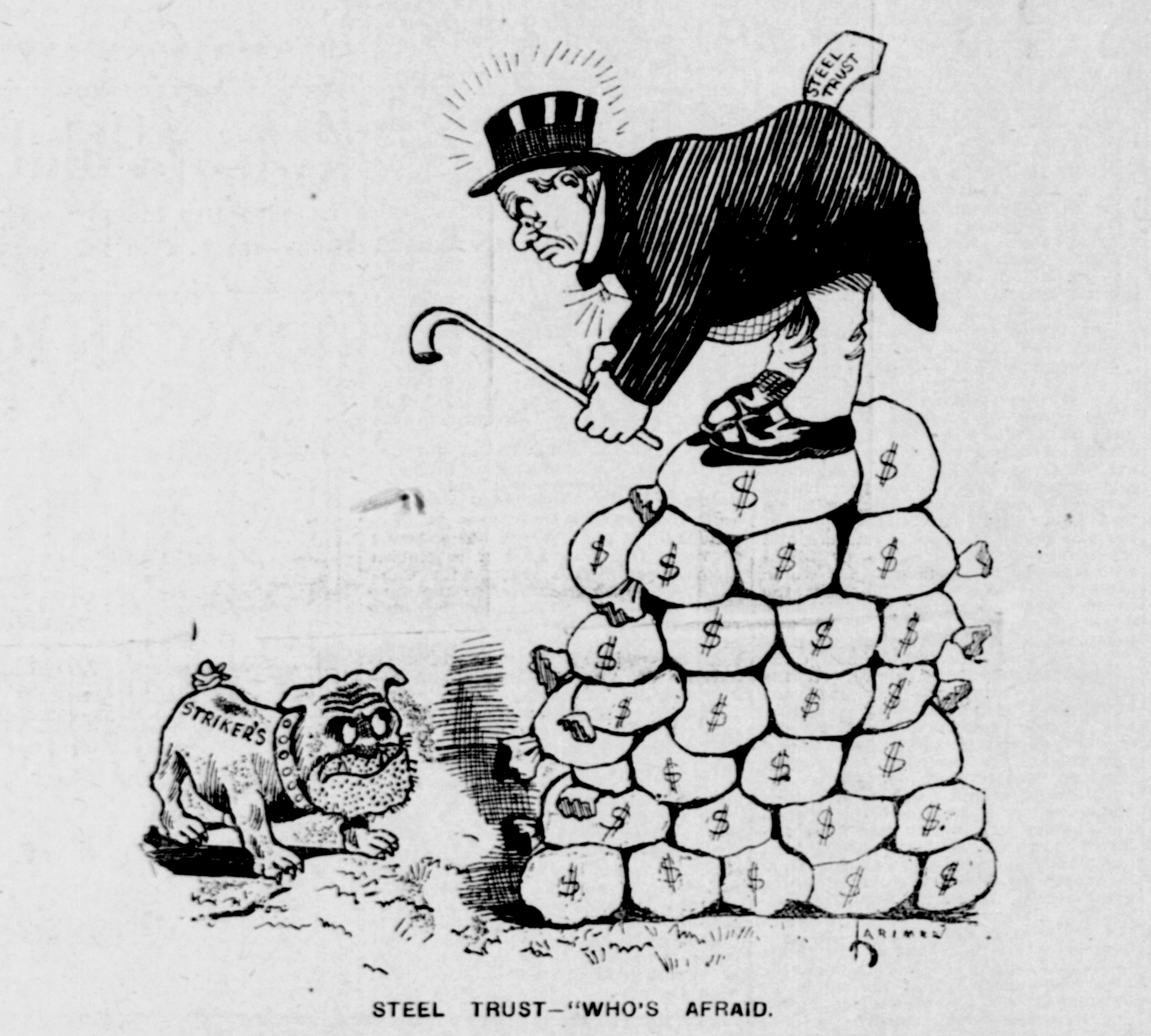
- Date: August 10 – September 14, 1901
- Goals: Union recognition in all plants
- Methods: Striking
- Result: Unsuccessful

Parties
| Amalgamated Association of Iron, Steel and Tin Workers (AA); Steel workers | U.S. Steel |

Lead figures
| T.J. Shaffer | Elbert Gary; J.P. Morgan |

Number
| 55,000 | |

The U.S. Steel recognition strike of 1901 was an attempt by the Amalgamated Association of Iron, Steel and Tin Workers (the AA) to reverse its declining fortunes and organize large numbers of new members. The strike failed.

== Background ==
The AA had formed in 1876. It was a labor union of skilled iron and steel workers which was deeply committed to craft unionism. However, technological advances had reduced the number of skilled workers in both industries.

In 1892, the AA had lost a bitter strike at the Carnegie Steel Company's steel mill in Homestead, Pennsylvania. The Homestead strike, which culminated with a day-long gun battle on July 6 that left 12 dead and dozens wounded, led to a wave of de-unionization. From a high of more than 24,000 members in 1892, union membership had sunk to less than 8,000 by 1900.

== Forces prompting the strike ==
The AA looked for growth in the tin industry, which still required skilled workers. By 1900, the union had organized 75 percent of the sheet metal mills and all but one of the tin mills in the country.

But the AA seriously misjudged both the economics and the technology underlying the tin industry. The formation of the American Tin Plate Company, a monopoly trust, on December 14, 1898, brought a number of nonunion plants into the union facilities of the American Tinplate Company. Daniel G. Reid, primary owner of the tin plate trust, agreed to recognize the AA at the nonunion plants after a token strike in 1899. The formation in March 1900 of the American Sheet Steel Company, another trust, also brought a number of nonunion plants together with unionized facilities. But this time the company refused to recognize the AA in the nonunion plants. Instead, the American Sheet Steel Co. idled its union facilities while keeping its nonunion works running at full speed.

The AA attempted to counteract the power of the trusts by amending its constitution. A clause was added which required every mill in a trust to strike if even one mill in the trust struck.

== Beginning of the crisis ==
The formation of the U.S. Steel trust in 1901 threatened the AA with ruin. U.S. Steel not only combined Elbert Gary and J.P. Morgan's Federal Steel with Andrew Carnegie's steel operations, it also incorporated the plants of the American Tin Plate Co. The AA was confronted with a crisis: It had to organize the plants of U.S. Steel before the corporation, with its comparatively limitless resources, could stop the union drives. But the executive committee of U.S. Steel was equally aware of the threat the AA posed, and the company's board of directors secretly adopted a resolution on June 17, 1901, opposing any unionization attempt. U.S. Steel's Tin Plate subsidiary reneged on promises to recognize the AA on the grounds that the union had not won contracts at every plant owned by the American Sheet Steel Co. Sheet Steel executives, meanwhile, not only refused to recognize the union at its nonunion plants but also began withdrawing recognition and refusing to bargain at its unionized plants.

== The strike ==
The AA tried to apply pressure on Sheet Steel by organizing U.S. Steel—the company which supplied Sheet Steel with most of its raw material. The AA settled on staging a recognition strike. U.S. Steel executives, worried about the impact of a strike during a high-demand time of the year and angered that Sheet Steel executives had provoked a strike with stridently anti-union actions, demanded a compromise. Subsequently, Sheet Steel officers agreed on July 13, 1901 to recognize the union at 18 of the company's 23 nonunion plants. But AA president T.J. Shaffer rejected the deal; after having demanded the unionization of every Sheet Steel plant, he would not be satisfied with anything less. A meeting between Morgan and Shaffer (accompanied by AA secretary John Williams) resulted in an additional wage agreement. But this wage agreement, which covered only the existing unionized plants, was rejected by the AA executive board.

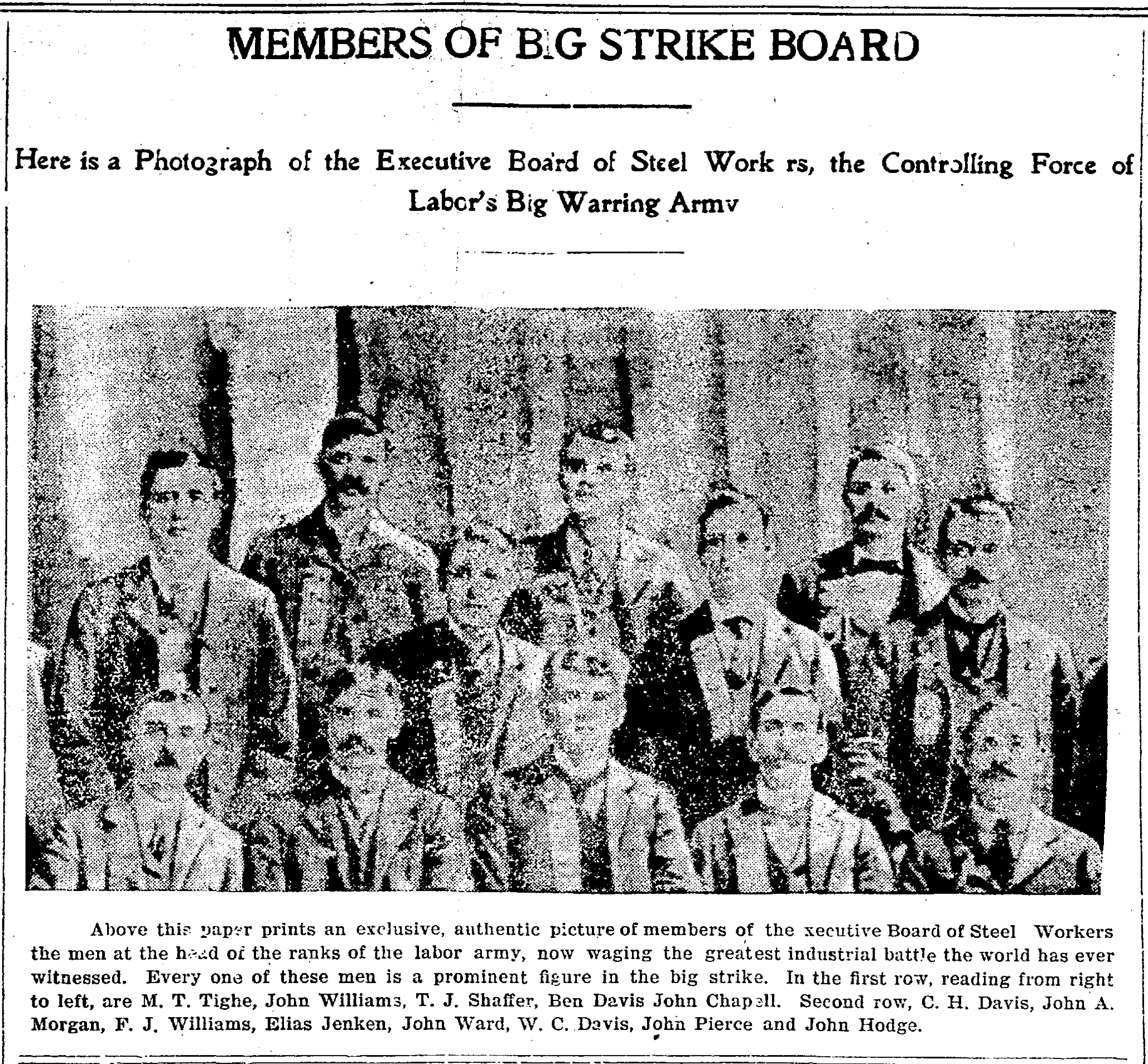

At a meeting on August 3, 1901, Morgan refused to renegotiate the wage agreement. It had been agreed to by Shaffer and Williams, and he considered it binding. The AA executive board ordered Shaffer to call a strike, to begin on August 10. The strike was crushed. At several plants, workers refused to turn out at all. Union members in Illinois and Pennsylvania turned out in small numbers. Unionized facilities at the National Steel and National Tube subsidiaries turned out almost to a man, but the overall effect on U.S. Steel was too weak. Strikebreakers were pouring into plants by the thousands, and shuttered works were reopening. Shaffer appealed to Samuel Gompers, asking for American Federation of Labor support and the calling of a national labor conference to make the strike the federation's main issue. Gompers refused.

The strike against U.S. Steel ended on September 14, 1901. The AA settled for terms far worse than those offered in August. Only plants which had started and ended the strike were covered, which meant that the union lost recognition at 15 plants. The company even won a pledge from the union not to organize any plant not already unionized, and to reject any offer of affiliation from a unionized plant.

In March 1903, the American Sheet Steel Co. merged with U.S. Steel, ensuring its future as a nonunion company.

== Aftermath ==
In A History of American Labor, Joseph G. Rayback has written,

After the strike was lost, the Amalgamated charged Gompers with "lukewarmness" and Mitchell of the U.M.W. with failure to keep a promise to support steelworkers. Although Gompers and Mitchell were exonerated by a committee of the federation, the indictment made an impression. It served to focus attention upon Gompers' and Mitchell's association with industrialists in the National Civic Federation. The more aggressive labor leaders began to reveal a suspicion of the alliance; socialists became convinced that Gompers had sold out; even some middle-class reformers sympathetic to labor began to doubt. Such attitudes became the basis for Mitchell's removal as U.M.W. head in 1908 and for attacks upon Gompers by radical labor elements until his death in the mid-twenties. They served to retard the A.F.L.'s development for more than a generation.

The AA never recovered from the U.S. Steel strike. It turned strongly conservative, hoping through submissiveness and cooperation to maintain its few remaining contracts.

U.S. Steel slowly dismantled AA unions in its plants. When the company merged its National Steel and American Steel Hoop subsidiaries into its Carnegie Steel arm in 1903, the union found itself servicing contracts with the now-nonexistent Steel Hoop company rather than Carnegie. In the depression of 1904, the Carnegie Company demanded significant wage cuts. The union balked and struck, but by December the strike had been broken and the union had lost almost all of its Western affiliates. U.S. Steel idled AA mills whenever possible, breaking the union through attrition.

Local AA unions often assisted in their own destruction. To make up for lower wages, AA members often worked overtime at regular pay rates or violated restrictions on speed-ups—in violation of their own union contracts. AA locals agreed time and again to wage cuts, eliminating the positive wage differential union shops had over nonunion facilities. This discouraged non-members from joining the union. U.S. Steel drove down wages so much that independent, nonunion plants had to cut salaries in order to stay competitive.

By 1909, membership in the AA had sunk to 6,300, and the union was finished as a force in the American labor movement.

== See also ==
- Recognition strike
