= Elbert Henry Gary =

American judge and businessman (1846–1927)

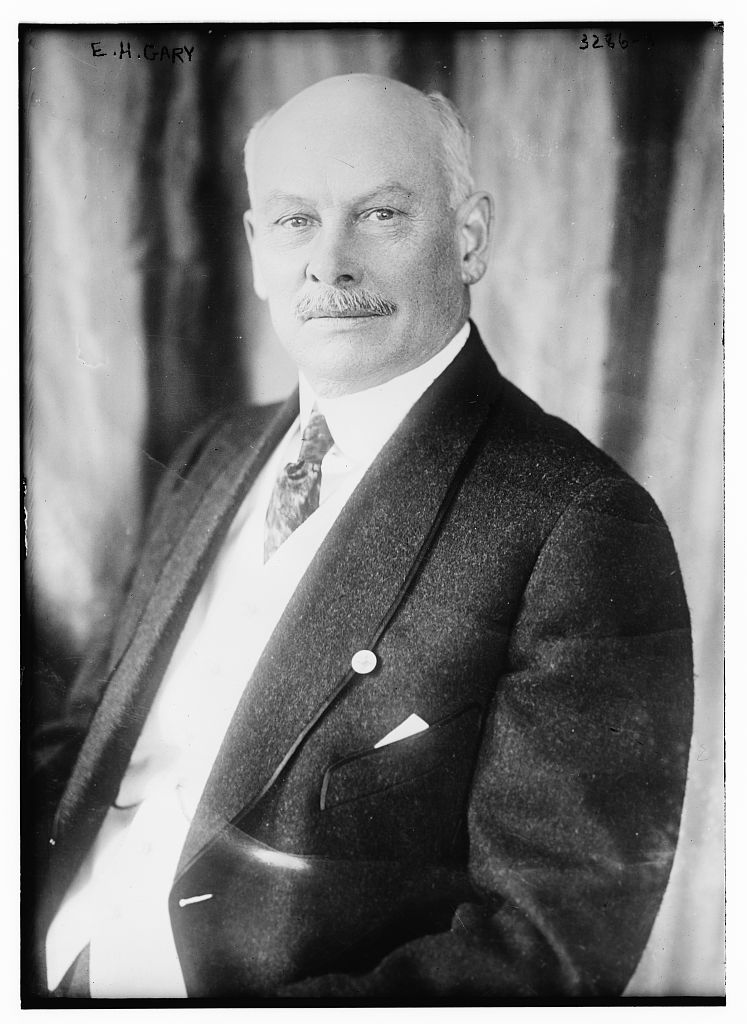
- Gary, c. 1915

2nd President of U.S. Steel
- In office 1903–1911
- Preceded by: Charles M. Schwab
- Succeeded by: James Augustine Farrell, Sr.

Personal details
- Born: October 8, 1846 Wheaton, Illinois, U.S.
- Died: August 15, 1927 (aged 80) New York City, U.S.
- Spouses: Julia Emily Graves (m. 1869; died 1902) Emma T Townsend (m. 1905)

Elbert Henry Gary (October 8, 1846 – August 15, 1927) was an American lawyer, county judge and business executive. He was a founder of U.S. Steel in 1901 alongside J. P. Morgan, William H. Moore, Henry Clay Frick and Charles M. Schwab. The city of Gary, Indiana, a steel town, was named for him when it was founded in 1906. Gary, West Virginia was also named after him. When trust busting President Theodore Roosevelt said that Gary was head of the steel trust, Gary considered it a compliment. The two men communicated in a nonconfrontational way, unlike Roosevelt's communications with leaders of other trusts.

== Biography ==
Elbert Henry Gary was born near Wheaton, Illinois, on October 8, 1846, to Erastus and Susan Abiah (née Vallette). He attended Wheaton College and graduated first in his class from Union College of Law in 1868. The school later became the Northwestern University School of Law. Gary started to practice law in Chicago in 1871 and also maintained an office in Wheaton. He was a co-founder (with his uncle, Jesse Wheaton) of the Gary-Wheaton Bank.

While he was working as a young corporate attorney for railroads and other clients in the years after the Great Chicago Fire, Gary was elected president of Wheaton three times, and when it became a city in 1892 he served as its first mayor for two terms.

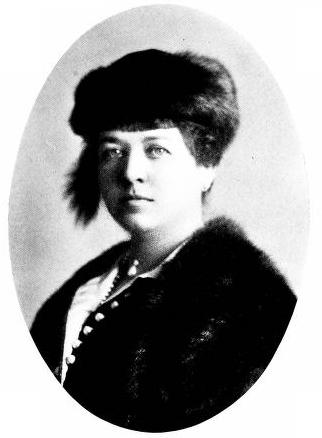
Emma T. Townsend (1916)

He served two terms as a DuPage County judge from 1882 to 1890. For the rest of his life he was known as "Judge Gary." It was a common custom in the nineteenth century for men to be addressed by military, political, or academic titles after those titles were no longer current.

== U.S. Steel ==
Gary practiced law in Chicago for about twenty-five years. He was president of the Chicago Bar Association from 1893 to 1894. It was while he was hearing a case as a judge that he first became interested in the process of making steel and the economics of that business. In 1898 he became president of Federal Steel Corporation in Chicago, which included a barbed wire business, and retired from his law practice. Federal and other companies merged in 1901 to become U.S. Steel, and Gary was elected chairman of the board of directors and the finance committee.

In 1900 at the age of 54, Gary moved from Wheaton to New York City, where he established the headquarters of U.S. Steel. Gary served as chairman of the board of America's first billion-dollar corporation, from the company's founding in 1901 until his death in August 1927. In November 1904, with a government suit looming, Gary approached President Roosevelt with a deal: cooperation in exchange for preferential treatment. U.S. Steel would open its books to the Bureau of Corporations; if the Bureau found evidence of wrongdoing, the company would be warned privately and given a chance to set matters right. Roosevelt accepted this "gentlemen's agreement" because it met his interest in accommodating the modern industrial order while maintaining his public image as slayer of the trusts.

According to historian Thomas C. Cochran:

Gary was one of the dozen best known businessman in the nation, and thus he serves as a striking example of a number of general trends. His career represents an early instance of the rise of the corporation lawyer to the top ranks of business – a pattern that was to be more and more encouraged by corporate complexity and government regulation....In the confusing world of the new corporation – of trusts, holding companies, leases, liens, and mergers – lawyers were necessary additions to boards of directors for only they could guide the bankers and industrialists through the dark areas of corporate finance....While Gary was unquestionably overly serious, pompous, and restricted in imagination, he tried to be a progressive business leader: giving the stockholders an unusual amount of information in annual reports; assuming responsibility for price leadership and orderly practices of competition; and sponsoring conservative technological progress.

According to historian Stephen H. Cutcliffe:

Gary faced several problems in organizing and running U.S. Steel. The huge enterprise remained a holding company with local management responsible for running individual plants. This arrangement led to tensions between the Gary-led board, which consisted primarily of bankers and lawyers, and the more traditional "competitive" steelmakers dominated by Carnegie’s men and Schwab in particular. Supported by Morgan, Gary consolidated his control of U.S. Steel during the next two years, becoming chair of the newly created board of directors in 1903....Gary also sought to close inefficient plants and, starting in 1906, to construct the world’s largest, fully-integrated steel plant on the shore of Lake Michigan in an area duly named Gary, Indiana. By 1911, the company had expended $78 million on the plant itself and the accompanying town. The steel industry traditionally had been characterized by destabilizing competition in the form of extensive price cutting. Gary sought to bring long-term economic stability to U.S. Steel and to the industry as a whole by institutionalizing publicly announced fixed prices. At the same time he sought to maintain wage stability.

== Gary and immigrants ==
In 1919 Gary led the steel industry's successful battle against the strikers, denouncing them as Slavic revolutionaries seeking "the closed shop, Soviets and the destruction of property." By 1923, however, he was the leader in building a big-business coalition to stop a widespread movement to impose strict restrictions on immigration, especially from Eastern and Southern Europe. Industry needed the manpower, he argued. He told the National Association of Manufacturers that the Emergency Quota Act of 1921 was wrongheaded because "restrictions upon immigration should be directed to the question of quality rather than numbers." He told his stockholders that its quota provision "was one of the worst things this country has ever done for itself economically."

== Family ==
His first wife, Julia Emily Graves, whom he married on June 25, 1869, died in 1902; they had two daughters, Gertrude and Bertha, who survived him. Gary was also survived by his second wife, Emma T. Townsend, whom he had married on December 5, 1905.

== Death ==
Some time after 1920, Gary developed from chronic myocarditis. He concealed the diagnosis even from his closest friends. The first indication that his illness was affecting him came in May 1923, when Gary became faint while addressing the semi-annual meeting of the American Iron and Steel Institute (AISI).

The press reported that Gary was in good health, but in February 1927 there were rumors that he intended to resign as chairman of U.S. Steel. In May 1927, he unexpectedly asked the board of directors of the AISI to select his successor some time in the next year.

About July 24, 1927, Gary fell ill. The press reported the cause as ptomaine poisoning (food poisoning). Gary's illness was not considered serious, and even his friends believed he would be back at work within a few weeks. The illness sparked new rumors that Gary would soon resign.

Gary's health appeared to improve, but around August 1 he entered into a serious decline. He died of chronic myocarditis at the age of 80 on August 15, 1927, at his home in Manhattan. He was buried in the Gary family mausoleum at Wheaton Cemetery in Wheaton, Illinois. Elbert Gary had erected the mausoleum 17 years earlier, and it contained the bodies of his parents and his first wife.

== Honors and memory ==
The town of Gary, Indiana, laid out in 1906 as a model home for steel workmen, was named in his honor. Despite this, Gary had no lasting personal connection with his namesake, which by the time of his death was approaching a population of 100,000.

In 1905, while he served as the president of U.S. Steel, the Pittsburgh Steamship Company vessel Elbert H. Gary was named in his honor. The Pittsburgh Steamship Company was a subsidiary of U.S. Steel and, when it was launched, the Gary was the longest ship on the Great Lakes.

From 1906 to 1908, he served as president of the Illinois State Society of New York, a group of Illinois expatriates living in New York who got together for social reasons a few times each year. They held an annual Lincoln Day Dinner in February at the Waldorf-Astoria Hotel and a Chicago Fire Remembrance Day each October at Delmonico's Restaurant in Manhattan.

In 1914 he was made chairman of the committee appointed by the Mayor of New York, John Purroy Mitchel, to study the question of unemployment and its relief.

His second wife was a member of the New York State Commission for the Panama–Pacific International Exposition in 1915; and acted as one of the official hostesses at the New York Pavilion during the exposition.

When America entered World War I in 1917, he was appointed chairman of the committee on steel of the Council of National Defense. Through his connection with a business essential to producing munitions of war, he exerted great influence in bringing about cooperation between the government and industry. He was interested in strengthening the friendship between America and Japan. In 1919, he was invited by President Woodrow Wilson to attend the Industrial Conference in Washington, and took a prominent part in it as a firm upholder of the "open shop", of which he was always a strong advocate.

In 2011 Gary was inducted into the inaugural class of the American Metal Market Steel Hall of Fame (http://www.amm.com/HOF-Profile/ElbertGary.html) for his work in the steel industry and as the longest-serving CEO of U.S. Steel.

== See also ==
- List of people on the cover of Time magazine: 1920s, July 5, 1926.

Business positions
Preceded by none	Chairman of U.S. Steel; March 2, 1901 – August 15, 1927	Succeeded by J.P. Morgan Jr.
Preceded by Charles M. Schwab	President of U.S. Steel; 1903-1911	Succeeded by James A. Farrell
