= Sons of Vulcan =

Former trade union of the United States

- Merged into: Amalgamated Association of Iron and Steel Workers
- Founded: 1858
- Dissolved: 1876
- Location: United States
- Members: 3,331 in 1874 (height)
- Key people: Miles Humphreys, first Grand Master (later President)

The Sons of Vulcan was an American labor union which existed from 1858 until 1876. The union recruited puddlers, skilled craftsmen who manipulated pig iron to create steel. In the 1870s, it was the strongest union in the United States. It merged with two other iron and steel unions in 1876 to form the Amalgamated Association of Iron and Steel Workers—the forerunner of the United Steelworkers.

== Formation ==
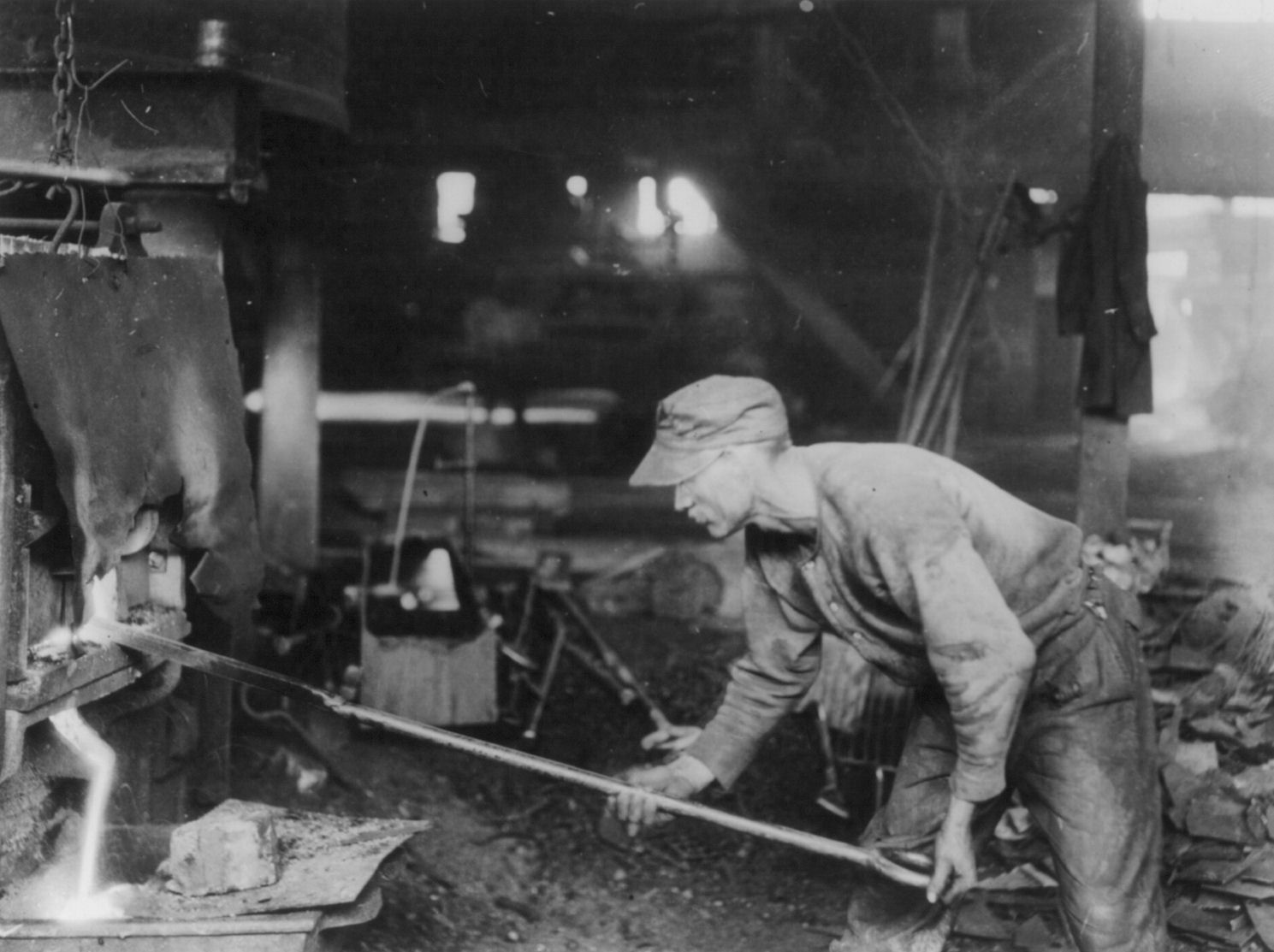
A puddler draining steel from a furnace to create a ball of molten iron, which he will carry to the rolling mill to be fabricated into useful steel items.

Puddling is the process of stirring pig iron with iron bars, exposing it to the air so that the carbon in the pig iron is oxidized and burns off. This process creates steel. As practiced in the early and mid-19th century, puddling required great strength as well as skill. Because chemical testing of the molten iron had not yet been developed, puddlers relied on their long experience with steelmaking to determine whether too much or too little carbon had been oxidized. Puddling was also an extremely dangerous trade, as some steel processes required the molten metal to boil and bubble as the puddler stirred in scrap iron and puddlers were required to physically remove slag and drain pure steel out of furnaces for additional processing.

The first strike in the iron and steel industry in the United States took place among puddlers in Pittsburgh, Pennsylvania, from December 20, 1849, to May 12, 1850. The employers broke the strike by cutting wages and hiring new puddlers. Labor relations in the iron and steel industry remained tense for much of the next decade. Wages plunged during the Panic of 1857, and the steel industry was slow to recover.

On April 12, 1858, a group of puddlers met at a hotel bar on Diamond Street to form a labor union, which they called the "Iron City Forge of the Sons of Vulcan". The new union resolved to commit itself to craft unionism, accepting only puddlers as members. Miles Humphreys was the new union's "Grand Master" (leader), and offices were established for a vice president ("Grand Vulcan") and secretary. The new union did little for two years, fearing the blacklist. The union's national leadership received no pay, but this changed in 1866 when the three national officers were paid the average industry wage in exchange for devoting full-time to union business. Membership in the union was kept secret, for fear of labor spies and physical retaliation.

The Civil War led to a sharp increase in the demand for steel, and wages rose substantially. Employers were loath to fire puddlers during the war because so few replacement workers could be found. This led to renewed interest in the Sons of Vulcan, which expanded rapidly. The locals formed a national union in Pittsburgh on September 8, 1862, calling itself the "Grand Forge of the United States, United Sons of Vulcan".

== Expansion ==
A second annual convention was held in Wheeling in the newly formed state of West Virginia in 1862, at which a constitution and bylaws were adopted.

As it became apparent in June 1864 that the Civil War might be coming to a close, employers attempted to cut wages. The union responded with a nationwide strike of its members, which lasted eight months. The strike ended on February 13, 1865, when the employers agreed to a wage scale based on the price of iron bars—the first time employers recognized the union, the first union contract in the iron and steel industry, and what may be the first union contract of any kind in the United States.

At the union's convention in Buffalo, New York which opened August 7, 1865, Humphreys reported that "forges" (as local unions of the organization were called) had been established in Illinois, Kentucky, New York, New Jersey, Maryland, Pennsylvania, Ohio, and West Virginia, and the union's membership had tripled. The following year, the union began employing paid organizers across the East. The union had 36 active forges and 1,514 members in 1867.

The union's strike policy, however, nearly proved its undoing. Initially, only the workers with a grievance would strike, with the majority of other workers in the refinery continuing to work. Absent union solidarity, employers easily broke strikes. Financial support for striking workers was provided by voluntary contributions from fellow "forge" members, not the national union. This strike policy led to the collapse of 11 local unions in 1867 and 16 more in 1868. The union counted only 600 members in 1868. In 1870, the Sons of Vulcan instituted a new policy in which only the national union could approve a strike and all workers in a local "forge" were required to walk out if a strike was approved. Additionally, the national union began providing limited financial support to strikers. These changes significantly improved the union's stability, and membership climbed to 3,331 members in 83 "forges" in 12 states by 1873.

The union saw a membership decline of about 25 percent after the Panic of 1873. Nonetheless, by 1876 the Sons of Vulcan was the strongest labor union in the U.S.

== Merger ==
Other iron and steel unions had also formed in the post-Civil War period, and in 1873 merger of the largest unions was proposed. The Associated Brotherhood of Iron and Steel Heaters, Rollers, and Roughers had formed in Chicago, Illinois, in 1861. This craft union recruited the skilled workers who rolled steel in railroad track mills, but soon expanded its membership to rollers throughout the iron and steel industry. Another union, the Iron and Steel Roll Hands of the United States, formed in Chicago in 1870. This union attracted anyone whom the Associated Brotherhood would not permit as a member. The Roll Hands never achieved much membership growth, which led the union to propose merger as a way of combating employer resistance to unions.

The main impetus for merger was the growing failure of many strikes. If the puddlers struck, steel and iron already manufactured would continue to be milled by the rollers, heaters, roughers and other mill hands. This enabled the employer to continue to manufacture product and receive revenue, and so outlast the union. The movement to form an industrial union began in Columbus, Ohio, where locals of the Sons of Vulcan, Associated Brotherhood and Roll Hands amalgamated into a single union. The National Labor Tribune, a newspaper dedicated to labor issues in the iron and steel industry, discussed industrial unionism extensively for the next year. On December 10, 1874, locals of all three unions from Columbus, Louisville, Kentucky, and New Albany, Indiana, met in Louisville to formulate a proposal, which was published in the National Labor Tribune.

After three years of negotiation, the three unions merged to form the Amalgamated Association of Iron and Steel Workers. At its convention in Troy, New York, in 1874, the Sons of Vulcan debated the industrial union proposal, and reacted favorably to it. However, the union took no formal action. The Roll Hands sent a representative to the Associated Brotherhood convention of July 1874 to negotiate a merger of the unions. Merger was effected in Indianapolis, Indiana, on August 6, 1875. The Sons of Vulcan, meeting at the same time in Philadelphia, Pennsylvania, did not accept merger at that time. The Sons of Vulcan replied on August 23, 1875, and informed the merging unions that they would participate. The three unions met in Pittsburgh on December 7, 1875, and drafted a constitution and bylaws. The three unions met separately in Emerald Hall in Pittsburgh on August 2, 1876, and adopted the resolution for amalgamation. On August 3, the three unions as well as a fourth (the United Nailers) met to debate and adopt the new constitution. The new Amalgamated Association was formed on August 4, 1876.

The Sons of Vulcan provided 85 percent of the new union's membership, and dominated the new organization for much of its early history. Its membership was almost exclusive to the iron industry, as steelmaking was still in its infancy.
