= John Brophy (labor) =

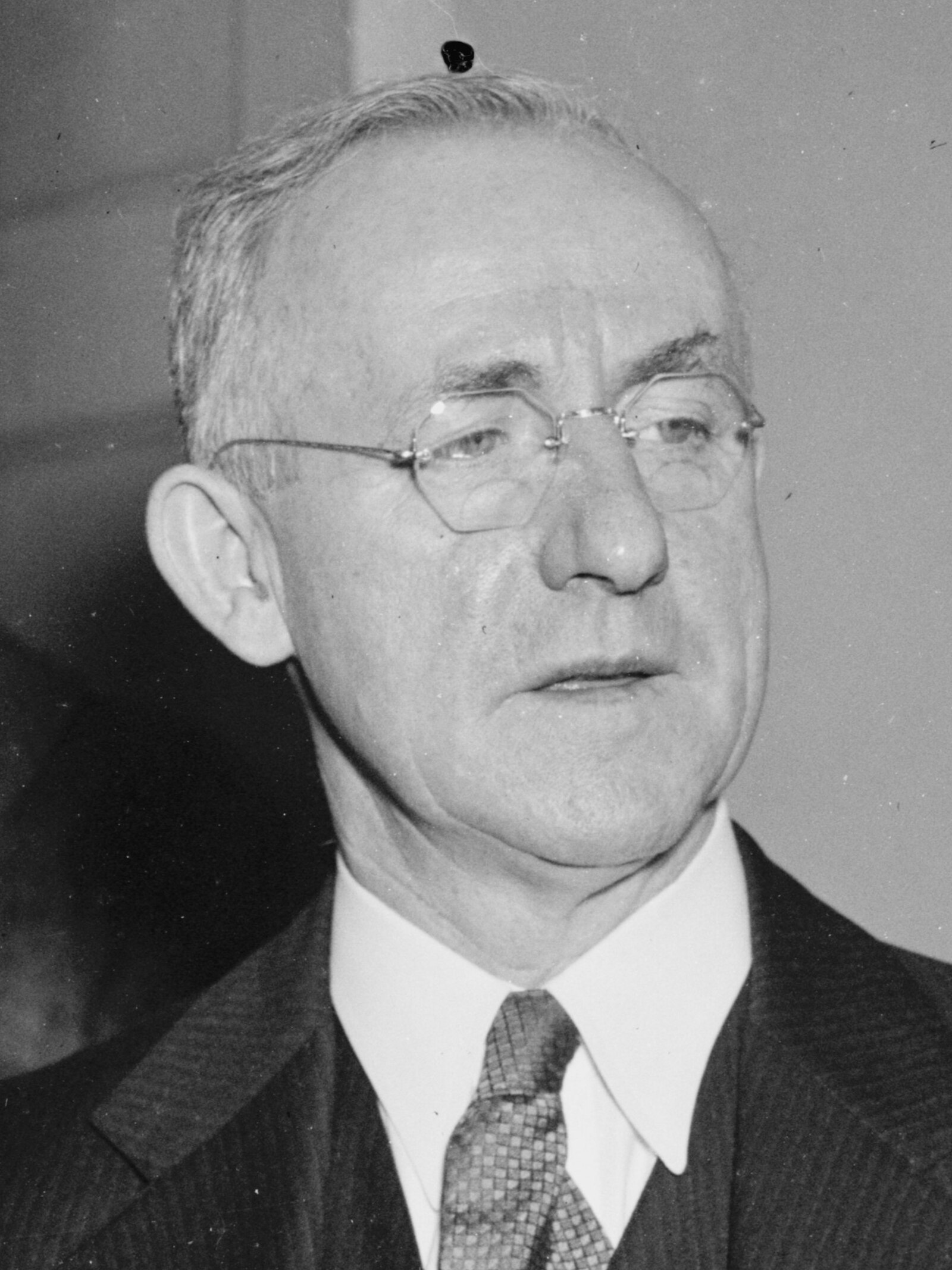
- Brophy in 1937
- Born: November 6, 1883; Lancashire, England
- Died: February 19, 1963 (aged 79)
- Occupation: Labor leader

John Brophy (November 6, 1883 – February 19, 1963) was an important figure in the United Mine Workers of America (UWMA) in the 1920s and the Congress of Industrial Organizations (CIO) in the 1930s and 1940s. He was the last major challenger to John L. Lewis' power within the UMWA and, after Lewis hired him back, a key leader within the CIO.

== The Mine Workers ==
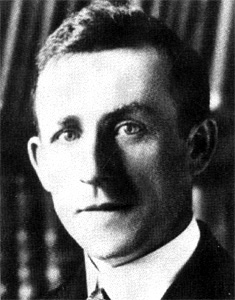
Brophy c. 1905

Brophy was born in Lancashire, England to a family of miners. His family emigrated to the United States when he was nine years old and found work in the central Pennsylvania coal mines. Brophy began working in the mines at age eleven; by the age of fourteen, he had joined the UMWA. He rose within the union to become president of District 2 of the UMWA.

Brophy ran against Lewis for President of the UMWA in 1926 on a "Save the Union" slate, calling for nationalization of the coal industry. He probably would have won the election if the vote had been held democratically.

Lewis drove Brophy and his supporters from the union after his victory in 1926. More specifically Lewis accused Brophy of dual unionism, based on the support that he had received from the Trade Union Educational League, an arm of the Communist Party which had supported his candidacy. The CPUSA later burned its bridges with Brophy, denouncing him as a reformist, after it adopted a policy of opposition to mainstream unions during the "Third Period".

Brophy was a self-educated man, who spent his time after Lewis' expelled him from the UMWA studying economics and philosophy. He was also deeply religious, relying on Rerum novarum, the papal encyclical of Pope Leo XIII supporting the right of workers to form unions, as the bridge between his faith and his commitment to the rights of workers.

In September 1927, with an American workers' delegation headed by James H. Maurer as its chairman, Brophy visited Soviet Union and exchanged opinions with its leader, Joseph Stalin.

== The CIO ==
Brophy was outside the labor movement for the next few years until 1933, when Lewis brought him back to work for the UMWA as it regained its membership in the early days of the New Deal. Lewis made him the CIO's first National Director from 1935 to 1938, then reassigned him in favor of one of his own loyalists. Brophy remained with the CIO after Lewis left it in 1941; his open disagreement with Lewis' opposition to Roosevelt's candidacy in 1940 probably would have led to his departure from the CIO if Lewis himself had not left it.

Lewis' successor as CIO President, Philip Murray, named Brophy the Director of Industrial Union Councils (IUC). He was instrumental in setting up IUCS in cities across the country, viewing them as the "community organizations of the CIO" that "can rally not only the support of all unions in the community, but they can also play a leading part in strengthening progressive sentiment in other unions and outside the organized labor movement.” Brophy argued that most people shared the goals of the CIO, and asserted that what they lacked was “the leadership that organized labor alone can give…" His position as Director of IUCs proved to be an important one in the expulsion of CP-led unions from the CIO following World War II. He was one of the strongest advocates for centralized control of the CIO's political action committees and the industrial councils, which were made up from delegates from the more or less autonomous unions affiliated with the CIO but which were themselves creations of the CIO, obliged to follow CIO policy imposed from above. In November–December 1942, he led a team whose report led to formation of the CIO-PAC in July 1943. In 1948 he led the crackdown on local labor councils and state bodies within the CIO that had endorsed American Labor Party candidate Henry Wallace or opposed the Marshall Plan in contravention of national CIO policy.

Brophy also served as a CIO representative to international labor organizations such as the World Federation of Trade Unions and the International Confederation of Free Trade Unions and as a labor representative on a number of government agencies, such as the National War Labor Board, the Committee on Fair Employment Practice established by Executive Order 8802 and the Wage Stabilization Board. He continued serving with the AFL-CIO after the CIO reunited with the AFL in 1955.
