= Robert Barton (author) =

- Occupations: Actor, author and academic

Academic background
- Education: BA; MA; PhD
- Alma mater: Western Michigan University; Bowling Green State University

Academic work
- Institutions: University of Oregon

Robert Barton is an American actor, author and academic known for his theatre texts and articles, primarily in the field of acting. He is a professor emeritus of Theatre Arts at the University of Oregon.

== Early life and education ==
Barton earned an undergraduate degree from Western Michigan University (1967). Subsequently, he received both his M.A. and Ph.D. from Bowling Green State University (1968 and 1977).

== Career ==
Barton initiated his career by acting for several Shakespeare Festivals and, in 1977, played the title role in a PBS production of Hamlet. He has performed in almost all of Shakespeare's plays and directed half of them. He received the American College Theatre Festival's Outstanding Acting Coach Award and the Association for Theatre in Higher Education's Best Book Award. Some of his later professional acting performances have been the title role in Galileo (Theatre for Social Change), C.S. Lewis in Shadowlands (Robinson Theatre), and Ivan in Art (Willamette Repertory Theatre).

In addition to his work in theatre, Barton held academic positions at Monmouth College, Clemson University, and the University of Maryland. In 1980, he began teaching at the University of Oregon as Head of the Acting Program and serves as professor emeritus of Theatre Arts.

== Publications ==
Barton's publications focus on discovering connections between acting and behavioral sciences, anthropology, and neuroscience while blending Western and Eastern theatre wisdom. He has written articles for journals such as Theatre Journal, Theatre Topics, and The Player’s Journal. His column, "Many Right Ways", was published in different editions of Voice and Speech Review.

=== Onstage and Off Trilogy ===
Barton first published Acting: Onstage and Off in 1986, and released its 7th edition in 2015. Through the book, he emphasized the importance of learning to act one's life with equal significance to acting in plays or films.

In 2003, Barton co-authored Voice: Onstage and Off with Rocco Dal Vera, which was revised and expanded to a third edition in 2017. The book integrated vocal production and technique into a unified approach, addressing vocal problems through psychological rather than solely physiological causes. He provided a printed analysis of established vocal training systems. It has also served as the primary text for the American Academy of Dramatic Arts.

Collaborating with Barbara Sellers Young, Barton completed the trilogy in 2017, focusing on stage movement skills and personal physical awareness with Movement: Onstage and Off.

=== Acting Reframes: Using NLP to Make Better Decisions in and out of the Theatre ===
In Acting Reframes: Using NLP to Make Better Decisions in and out of the Theatre, Barton applied the field of Neuro Linguistic Programming involving visual, auditory and kinesthetic learning modes to the work, personal interactions, and career pursuits of the actor.

=== The Craft of Comedy ===
Barton edited The Craft of Comedy by Athene Seyler and Stephen Haggard, adding summaries, term definitions, and exercises for readers. He also provided supplementary introductory material on the correspondents' lives, the culture of the time, and the book's evolution.

=== Theatre in Your Life ===
Alongside Annie McGregor, Barton co-wrote Theatre in Your Life as a guide to theatre on a global level, featuring African and Asian theatre as well as American ethnic performance. He also related live theatre to media experiences and the challenges of everyday life and updated the book to its third edition in 2014.

=== Life Themes ===
Barton published the second edition of Life Themes as a companion anthology of plays with extended introductions and full scripts for twelve plays, around the themes of love, war, generations, death and hope.

=== Style for Actors: A Handbook for Moving Beyond Realism ===
Barton penned Style for Actors: A Handbook for Moving Beyond Realism as a guide for performers tackling the acting demands of Greek, Shakespearean, Restoration, Eighteenth Century, and other plays that move beyond realism into stylization, with its third edition published in 2020. Using an anthropological approach, he explored acting issues through time, space, place, values, structure, beauty, sex, recreation, sight, and sound, earning the Best Book Award from the Association for Theatre in Higher Education.

== Awards and honors ==
- Outstanding Acting Coach Award, American College Theatre Festival
- Best Book Award, Association for Theatre in Higher Education

== Bibliography ==
=== Selected books ===
- Acting Reframes: Using NLP to Make Better Decisions in and out of the Theatre (2011) ISBN 978-0415592321
- The Craft of Comedy (2012) ISBN 978-0415527231
- Theatre in Your Life (3rd edition, 2014) ISBN 978-0534640699
- Life Themes (2014) ISBN 978-1285463575
- Acting: Onstage and Off (7th edition, 2015) ISBN 978-0495566618
- Voice: Onstage and Off (3rd edition, 2017) ISBN 978-0534140717
- Movement: Onstage and Off (2017) ISBN 978-1138907829
- Style for Actors: A Handbook for Moving Beyond Realism (3rd edition, 2020) ISBN 978-0367186104

=== Selected articles ===
- Barton, R. (1983). [Review of Acting with Style, by J. Harrop & S. R. Epstein]. Theatre Journal, 35(1), 138–139.
- Barton, R., & Gupton, J. L. (2000). "Gogging": A Model for Theatre Pedagogy. Theatre Topics, 10(2), 169–183.
- Barton, R. (2002). [Review of the book The Royal Family, and: Lady Windemere's Fan]. Theatre Journal, 54(4), 646–648.
- Barton, R. (2011). Many “Right” Ways: Honoring Diverse Teaching Methods and Learning Modes. Voice and Speech Review, 7(1), 102–103.
