= Arab Canadians =

Canadian ethnic group

Arab Canadians Arabo-Canadiens
كنديون عرب
- Arab Canadians as percent of population by census division (2021)

Total population
- 795,665 2.8% of the total Canadian population (2021) (2021 Census)

Regions with significant populations
- Montreal, Toronto, Ottawa, Calgary, Edmonton, Windsor, London
- Ontario: 284,215 (2.0%)
- Quebec: 280,075 (3.3%)
- Alberta: 69,505 (1.6%)
- British Columbia: 28,010 (0.6%)
- Nova Scotia: 10,610 (1.1%)

Languages
- Arabic (including various dialects); Canadian English; Canadian French

Religion
- Islam (59.2%); Christianity (26.2%); Irreligion (11.4%); Druze (0.8%); other (3%) [2021]

Related ethnic groups
- Iraqi diaspora; Egyptian diaspora; Lebanese diaspora; Palestinian diaspora; Moroccan diaspora; Syrian diaspora; Somali diaspora

Arab Canadians (French: Arabo-Canadiens) come from all of the countries of the Arab world. According to the 2021 Census, there were 795,665 Canadians, or 2.2%, who claimed Arab ancestry. According to the 2011 census there were 380,620 Canadians who claimed full or partial ancestry from an Arabic-speaking country. The large majority of the Canadians of Arab origin population live in either Ontario or Quebec.

== Population ==
According to the 2021 census by Statistics Canada, 795,665 Canadians identified as Arab, constituting 2.2% of the entire Canadian population. The five provinces with the most Arabs in 2021 were Ontario, Quebec, Alberta, British Columbia, and Nova Scotia. Over 75% of Arab Canadians lived in either Montreal, Toronto, Ottawa, Calgary, Edmonton, or Windsor. Throughout Canada, Montreal contains the highest number of Arabs with 290,070.

Just over 3 in 10 Arab Canadians are born in Canada. For the rest that are foreign-born, Lebanon, Syria, Morocco, Egypt, and Iraq were the most common places of birth.

== History ==
Raja G. Khouri, who has served as President of the Canadian Arab Federation, in 2003 described the interconnected perceptions of a Canadian national identity and Arab identity. In 2009, University of Alberta professor Wisam Kh. Abdul-Jabbar described the "double consciousness" of Arab Canadians, variously struggling with their Arab Canadian identity versus a sense of "being Canadian". Abdul-Jabbar has proposed that citizens or residents of Arab descent have come to consider a cautious dual-identity approach as essential to social integration in the country.

Presented at the 2009 annual American Sociological Association meeting, research from Madona Mokbel detailed the "Dichotomous Perceptions of the Arab Canadian Identity in Canada", particularly since the 2001 9/11 attacks. Shortly after the attacks, Canadian Museum of Civilization postponed an exhibit, The Lands within Me, displaying the diasporic-based works of thirty Arab-Canadian artists. Moral outrage at the short notice of the postponement, suspicion of its connection to the attacks and subsequent protest at the decision, has been described as an early centralizing medium for Arab Canadian identity.

Dr Christina Civantos of Miami University, writing in Food for Our Grandmothers, has detailed the broad and sometimes conflicting elements that constitute the Arab world and which, therefore, do not always simply amalgamate into a coherent Arab Canadian identity. The collection of writing by Arab-American and Arab-Canadian feminists, in analysis by Amaney Jamal, has been described as shifting the definition of Arab Canadian identity onwards from "essentializing categories" while still explicitly confronting the racial and cultural realities of Arabs in North America.

In 2013, academic Paul Eid, a researcher at Commission des droits de la personne et des droits de la jeunesse, has remarked that Canadians of a Coptic Egyptian background are the most likely to explicitly embrace an Arab-Canadian self-identification, due to the fact Copts were some of the earliest Arabic immigrants to Canada since the 1960s.

== Geographical distribution ==
The distribution of the Arab population of Canada according to the 2001, 2011, and 2016 Canadian censuses was as follows:

Province or territory	Arabs 2001	% 2001	Arabs 2011	% 2011	Arabs 2016	% 2016	Arabs 2021	% 2021
Québec	73,345	1.0%	166,260	2.2%	213,740	2.7%	280,075	3.3%
Ontario	88,545	0.8%	151,645	1.2%	210,435	1.6%	284,215	2.0%
Alberta	19,320	0.7%	34,920	1.0%	56,700	1.4%	69,505	1.6%
British Columbia	6,605	0.2%	14,090	0.3%	19,840	0.4%	28,010	0.6%
Nova Scotia	3,610	0.4%	6,285	0.7%	8,110	0.9%	10,610	1.1%
Manitoba	1,230	0.1%	3,240	0.3%	5,030	0.4%	7,820	0.6%
Saskatchewan	900	0.1%	2,095	0.2%	4,300	0.4%	5,575	0.5%
New Brunswick	580	0.1%	1,380	0.2%	2,960	0.4%	5,060	0.7%
Newfoundland and Labrador	270	0.1%	370	0.1%	1,375	0.3%	1,740	0.3%
Prince Edward Island	175	0.0%	200	0.1%	585	0.4%	1,125	0.7%
Northwest Territories	80	0.2%	110	0.3%	100	0.2%	225	0.6%
Nunavut	10	0.0%	15	0.0%	40	0.1%	35	0.1%
Yukon	10	0.0%	0	0.0%	10	0.0%	20	0.1%
Canada	194,685	0.7%	380,620	1.2%	523,235	1.5%	694,015	1.9%

== Demography ==
=== National origins ===
Country	2016
Lebanon	219,555’´*
Algeria	104,395´’
Morocco	103,945’´*
Saudi Arabia	86,810’´*
Syria	77,045’’
Egypt	73,250’´*
Palestine	50,245´*
Kuwait	2,235´’
Tunisia	25,645´’
Iraq	68,490´’
UAE	25,530´’
Sudan	19,960’´
Jordan	25,250’´
Mauritania	9,325’´
Libya	7,740’´
Yemen	6,645’´
Canada total	756,455’´

=== Religion ===
According to the 2021 Canadian census, 26.17% of Arab Canadians are Christian, 59.27% are Muslim, and 11.36% are irreligious. These number differ measurably from the numbers reported in the 2001 Canadian census, which showed an even split in the Arab Canadian community between those who practised the Muslim faith with 46% and those who practised the Christian faith 49%, (where 58% were Catholic, 23% were Eastern Orthodox and 20% were Other Christian). In 2011, less than 3% of Arab Canadians are Jewish. The largest Arab Jewish communities in Canada are Moroccan and Iraqi. Other Arabs Jews are of Egyptian, Syrian, Algerian, and Lebanese descent.

The percentage of Arab Canadians were not affiliated with any religions only marginally increased from 6% in 2001 to 8% in 2011.

The highest rates of Arab Christians in Canada come from Israel, Egypt, Lebanon and Iraq, while the highest rates of Arab Muslims in Canada come from Libya, Algeria, Morocco and Tunisia.

Arab Canadian demography by religion
Religious group	2001 (Note: Religious breakdown proportions based on "Arab", "Lebanese", "Algerian", "Moroccan", "Syrian", "Egyptian", "Palestinian" and "Iraqi" ethnic or cultural origin response on the 2001 census.)		2021 (Note: Religious breakdown proportions based on "Lebanese", "Moroccan", "Algerian", "Saudi Arabian", "Syrian", "Egyptian", "Palestinian", "Kuwaiti", "Tunisian", "Iraqi", "Libyan", "Sudanese", "Jordanian", "Mauritanian", "Yemeni" and "Arab n.o.s." ethnic or cultural origin response on the 2021 census.)	
Religious group	Pop.	%	Pop.	%
Christianity	169,840	48.6%	272,565	26.17%
Islam	159,560	45.66%	617,320	59.27%
Irreligion	20,570	5.89%	118,375	11.36%
Judaism	8,385	2.4%	22,835	2.19%
Other	1,115	0.32%	10,485	1.01%
Total Arab Canadian population	349,470	100%	1,041,580	100%

Arab Canadian demography by Christian sects
Religious group	2001		2021	
Religious group	Pop.	%	Pop.	%
Catholic	100,045	58.91%	128,125	47.01%
Orthodox	39,385	23.19%	62,845	23.1%
Protestant	16,020	9.43%	14,770	5.42%
Other Christian	14,380	8.47%	67,125	24.63%
Total Arab Canadian christian population	169,840	100%	272,565	100%

== Identity ==
Arab Canadian identity is the objective or subjective state of perceiving oneself as an Arab Canadian and as relating to being Arab Canadian. The expression of the identity has been widely analyzed and observed by academics as a culturally challenging self-identification in the context of elements of Western culture in the 21st-century.

A survey conducted in Edmonton, Alberta in the pre-2000, showed females 3 in 10, and 1 in 10 males, "tried to hide their Arab-Canadian identity". The research also significantly contrasted along lines of faith, with 44 percent of Arab Christians and 13 percent Arab Muslims also suppressing the identity.

Research by academics Caitlin McDonald and Barbara Sellers-Young has also suggested that anti-Arabism and prejudice in North America can create a hostile environment for the expression of Arab Canadian identity.

== Notable individuals ==
=== Business ===
- Feras Antoon - co-founder and CEO of MindGeek (of Syrian descent)
- Wafic Saïd - billionaire businessman (Syrian)
- Kevin O'Leary - entrepreneur and reality television personality (Dragons' Den, Shark Tank) (of Lebanese and Irish descent)
- Ablan Leon - founder of Leon's furniture company in 1901 in Welland, Ontario (born in Lebanon)
- Dov Charney - founder of American Apparel and Los Angeles Apparel (of Syrian descent from his mother’s side)
- Ayah Bdeir – founder of LittleBits (of Syrian descent)

=== Politicians ===
- Mohammad Al Zaibak - current Senator
- Omar Alghabra - current Liberal MP in the federal riding of Mississauga Centre in Ontario, Canada (of Syrian descent, born in Saudi Arabia)
- Pierre de Bané - former Liberal MP (1968–1984), Cabinet Minister and former Senator (of Palestinian descent)
- Sam Hamad - he held various cabinet posts during his 14 years in the National Assembly of Quebec (of Syrian descent)
- Michael Basha - former member of the Senate of Canada (of Lebanese descent)
- Tarik Brahmi - former NDP member of House of Commons for Saint-Jean (of Algerian descent)
- Ramez Ayoub - former Member of Parliament for Thérèse-De Blainville, former mayor of Lorraine (of Syrian descent)
- Fonse Faour - former NDP MP and leader of Newfoundland NDP (of Lebanese descent)
- Eddie Francis - Mayor of Windsor, Ontario (of Lebanese descent)
- Joe Ghiz - former Premier of Prince Edward Island (of Lebanese descent)
- Tony Clement - served as an Ontario cabinet minister, including as Minister of Health and Industry (of Syrian-Jewish descent from his mother's side)
- Robert Ghiz - Premier of Prince Edward Island (of Lebanese descent)
- Sadia Groguhé - former NDP member of House of Commons for Saint-Lambert (of Algerian descent)
- Mac Harb - Senator, former Liberal MP (1988–2004) and former Ottawa City Councilor (of Lebanese descent)
- Sana Hassainia - former NDP member of House of Commons for Verchères—Les Patriotes riding (of Tunisian descent)
- Lorraine Michael - former Nun, leader of New Democratic Party of Newfoundland and Labrador (of Lebanese descent)
- Maria Mourani - former Bloc Québécois (2006–2013) and independent MP (2013–2015) in federal riding of Ahuntsic in Quebec, Canada (of Lebanese descent)
- Khalil Ramal - Ontario MPP (of Lebanese descent)
- Djaouida Sellah - former NDP member of House of Commons for Saint-Bruno—Saint-Hubert (of Algerian descent)
- Paul Zed - lawyer, professor, former Member of Parliament (of Lebanese descent)
- Sam Elkas - former representative of the electoral district of Robert-Baldwin in the National Assembly of Quebec. (of Syrian descent)

=== Political activists ===
- Maher Arar - human rights activist; deportation and tortured victim in Syrian jail (of Syrian descent)
- Monia Mazigh - human rights activist and New Democratic Party candidate (of Tunisian descent)
- Samah Sabawi - Palestinian rights activist and playwright
- Rahaf Mohammed - Refugee and activist from Saudi Arabia

=== Filmmakers and writers ===
- Rawi Hage (Author: De Niro's Game, Beirut Hellfire Society, Cockroach; Lebanese)
- Ruba Nadda - film director who won the Best Canadian Feature Film award in 2009 (of Syrian and Palestinian descent)
- Anisa Mehdi - Emmy Award-winning film director, journalist and director of Inside Mecca (of Iraqi descent)
- Wajdi Mouawad (Writer: Incendies, Lebanese)
- Trish Salah - Lambda Award-winning poet and writer, author of Wanting in Arabic and Lyric Sexology, Vol. 1
- Habeeb Salloum (1924-2019) - prominent author and freelance writer
- Donald Shebib - documentary filmmaker (of Lebanese descent)
- Ameer Idreis - writer, playwright, and urbanist (of Palestinian descent)

=== Singers ===
- Ali Gatie - singer (of Iraqi descent)
- Paul Anka - singer (of Syrian-Lebanese descent)
- Belly - rap/hip hop artist (of Palestinian descent)
- Andy Kim - pop singer/songwriter (of Lebanese descent)
- K.Maro - rapper (of Lebanese descent)
- Kristina Maria - singer/songwriter (of Lebanese descent)
- La Zarra - singer/songwriter (of Moroccan descent), represented France at the Eurovision Song Contest 2023
- Massari - pop and hip-hop singer (of Lebanese descent)
- Narcy - rapper (of Iraqi descent)
- Nasri - reggae and pop singer (of Palestinian descent)
- Nemahsis - singer-songwriter (of Palestinian descent)
- Raffi - children musician and composer (of Egyptian descent), famous for Baby Beluga
- Vaï - rapper, hip hop singer (of Moroccan descent)
- Karl Wolf - singer (of Lebanese descent)
- Zaho - singer (of Algerian descent)

=== Athletes ===
- Jamal Murray - professional NBA player (of Syrian descent from his mother's side)
- Sami Zayn - professional WWE wrestler (of Syrian descent)
- Ramzi Abid - professional hockey player (of Tunisian descent)
- David Azzi - professional player in Canadian Football League (of Lebanese descent)
- John Hanna - professional hockey player (of Lebanese descent)
- Ed Hatoum - professional hockey player (of Lebanese descent)
- Fabian Joseph - former professional hockey player for the Canada men's national ice hockey team (of Lebanese descent)
- Nazem Kadri - professional hockey player (of Lebanese descent)
- Aliyah - professional WWE wrestler (of Syrian-Iraqi descent)
- John Makdessi - professional mixed martial arts (MMA) fighter (of Lebanese descent)
- Alain Nasreddine - professional hockey player (of Lebanese descent)
- Jean Sayegh - water polo player (of Lebanese descent)
- Yassine Bounou - professional soccer player for the Morocco national football team (of Moroccan descent)

=== Others ===
- Reema Abdo - former backstroke swimmer (of Yemeni descent)
- René Angélil - manager and husband of Céline Dion, (of Syrian descent)
- Nahlah Ayed - journalist (of Palestinian descent)
- Rachid Badouri - comedian (of Moroccan descent)
- Hoda ElMaraghy - first woman to serve as dean of engineering at a Canadian university. Appointed as Canada Research Chair (CRC) in manufacturing systems in 2002. (of Egyptian descent)
- Mohamed Fahmy - journalist and reporter
- Jade Hassouné - known for his role as Meliorn in the US television series "Shadowhunters" and for that of Prince Ahmed Al Saeed in the Canadian series '"Heartland" (of Lebanese descent)
- Jesse Hutch - actor, model, director and musician (of Syrian descent)
- Saja Kilani - actress (of Jordanian-Palestinian descent)
- Mena Massoud - an actor best known for starring as Aladdin in the 2019 live-action adaptation (of Egyptian descent)
- Habeeb Salloum - author, cookbook author, writer, travel writer (of Syrian descent)
- Inanna Sarkis - internet personality, actress and director (of Syrian descent)
- Mamdouh Shoukri - former president of York University (of Egyptian descent)
- Ty Wood - an actor and model. Grand nephew of Miss Universe 1971 Georgina Rizk (of Palestinian-Lebanese Hungarian descent.)

== See also ==
- Middle Eastern Canadians
- West Asian Canadians
- Canadian Arab Federation (CAF)
- National Council on Canada-Arab Relations (NCCAR)
- Arab Christians
- Islam in Canada
- Lebanese diaspora
- Palestinian diaspora
- Syrian diaspora
- Moroccan diaspora
- Iraqi diaspora
- Egyptian diaspora
