= David MacDonald =

David MacDonald may refer to:

- David MacDonald (British politician) (1857–1919), Conservative MP for Bothwell
- David MacDonald (director) (1904–1983), Scottish film director
- David R. Macdonald (1930–2008), U.S. Under Secretary of the Navy
- David MacDonald (Canadian politician) (born 1936), Canadian minister and politician
- Dave MacDonald (1936–1964), American sports car driver
- David Macdonald (accountant) (born 1942), New Zealand accountant who served as auditor-general between 1994 and 2001
- David Macdonald (biologist) (born 1951), British zoologist
- David Bruce MacDonald (born 1973), political scientist
- D. K. C. MacDonald (1920–1963), Scottish-Canadian physicist
- D. R. MacDonald (born 1939), pen-name, American-Canadian author, lives Cape Breton Island
- David Ross Macdonald, guitarist, drummer and singer/songwriter
- David Robertson MacDonald (1764–1845), British army officer
- Robert David MacDonald (1929–2004), playwright and director, known as David

== See also ==
- David McDonald (disambiguation)
