= David McDonald =

David McDonald may refer to:

- David McDonald (astronomer) (born 1964), Irish amateur astronomer and discoverer of minor planets
- David McDonald (footballer) (born 1971), Irish footballer
- David Cargill McDonald, Canadian jurist who headed the Royal Commission of Inquiry into Certain Activities of the RCMP, better known as the McDonald Commission
- David J. McDonald (1902–1979), American labor leader and president of the United Steelworkers of America, 1952–1965
  - David J. McDonald Jr. (1939–2017), his son, professor of drama emeritus at University of California, Irvine
- David Tennant (born 1971 as David John McDonald), Scottish actor, famous for portraying the Doctor in Doctor Who
- David L. McDonald (1906–1997), United States Navy admiral
- David McDonald (Prince Edward Island politician) (1862–1939), Speaker of the Legislature in Prince Edward Island, Canada, 1928–1931
- David McDonald (Wisconsin politician), member of the Wisconsin State Assembly
- David McDonald (judge) (1803–1869), United States federal judge
- David Wylie McDonald (1927–2007), Scottish architect and colonial civil servant
- Dave McDonald (baseball) (1943–2017), American baseball player
- Dave McDonald (ice hockey) (born 1960), Canadian ice hockey player

== See also ==
- David MacDonald (disambiguation)
