= Richard Dalitz =

Australian physicist (1925–2006)

Dick Dalitz
- Born: Richard Henry Dalitz; 28 February 1925; Dimboola, Australia
- Died: 13 January 2006 (aged 80); Oxford, England
- Education: Melbourne University; University of Cambridge
- Known for: Dalitz plot Dalitz pair CDD poles
- Awards: Fellow of the Royal Society (1960); Maxwell Medal and Prize (1966); Hughes Medal (1975); Royal Medal (1982); Harrie Massey Medal and Prize (1990)
- Scientific career
- Fields: Particle physics Quantum mechanics
- Workplaces: University of Bristol; University of Birmingham; Cornell University; Enrico Fermi Institute; University of Oxford
- Thesis: Zero-zero transitions in nuclei (1950)
- Doctoral advisor: Nicholas Kemmer
- Doctoral students: Frank Close; Christopher Llewellyn Smith; Crispin Gardiner

Richard Henry Dalitz, FRS (28 February 1925 – 13 January 2006) was an Australian physicist known for his work in particle physics.

== Education and early life ==
Born in the town of Dimboola, Victoria, Dalitz studied physics and mathematics at Melbourne University before moving to the United Kingdom in 1946, to study at the University of Cambridge. His PhD was awarded in 1950 for research on zero-zero transitions in the atomic nucleus supervised by Nicholas Kemmer.

== Research and career ==
After his PhD, he took up a one-year post at the University of Bristol, and then joined Rudolf Peierls' group at University of Birmingham. Dalitz moved to Cornell University in 1953. He then became a professor at the Enrico Fermi Institute in Chicago from 1956 to 1963. Next, he moved to the University of Oxford as a Royal Society research professor, although keeping a connection with Chicago until 1966. He retired in 1990.

At Birmingham he completed his thesis demonstrating that the electrically neutral pion could decay into a photon and an electron-positron pair, now known as a Dalitz pair. In addition, he is known for other key developments in particle physics: the Dalitz plot and the Castillejo–Dalitz–Dyson (CDD) poles. The Dalitz plots were proposed in 1953, while he was at Cornell.

Dalitz plots play a central role in the discovery of new particles in current high-energy physics experiments, including Higgs boson research, and are tools in exploratory efforts that might open avenues beyond the Standard Model.

His various fundamental contributions have led to practitioners in the field to identify Dalitz as one of particle physics "greatest unsung scientists" and "a theorist exceptionally valued by experimentalists."

=== Quantum mechanics ===
Dalitz was an old and close friend of John Clive Ward, the creator of the Ward Identities. Their friendship began around 1948 when Dalitz independently derived Ward's results for the polarisation entanglement of two photons propagating in opposite directions. Dalitz was the lead author of a succinct, and yet revealing, account of Ward's physics. While commenting on the physics surrounding the derivation of the probability amplitude

$$\left|\psi\right\rang=(\left|x,y\right\rang - \left|y,x\right\rang )$$

by Ward, Dalitz and Duarte wrote: "Ward and Pryce calculated, using quantum mechanics, the distribution of the azimuth angle between the planes of polarization of... two gamma rays from positron-electron annihilation... the two photons are entangled and according to local realism, their polarization planes should become independent... a typical EPR situation. Already in 1948, observations... agreed with quantum mechanics, not with local realism."

=== Quarks ===
Dalitz was directly involved in pioneering quark research since the early 1960s, at a time when leading theorists considered quarks as purely mathematical entities, and he participated in the identification of the top quark. In 1965 he began a series of lectures on the physics of quarks that became a "bible for the relatively few who then took it seriously."

=== Publications ===
During his lifetime, Dalitz produced numerous publications. One article lists 221 papers, and a total of 26 authored book reviews, public lectures and obituaries, and edited books. Amongst his book reviews was a critical review of Andrew Pickering's book Constructing Quarks, in which he takes to task Pickering's implication that experimenters are essentially subservient to theoreticians, saying "In reality, experimenters are cussed individuals, eager to prove the theoreticians wrong whenever possible".

His research collaborators included Hans Bethe, Frank Close, F. J. Duarte, Freeman Dyson, Nicholas Kemmer, Rudolf Peierls, Christopher Llewellyn Smith and John Clive Ward.

== Awards and honours ==
Dalitz was elected a Fellow of the Royal Society (FRS) in 1960 and he received the Hughes Medal in 1975 "for his distinguished contributions to the theory of the basic particles of matter." He was also awarded the Maxwell Medal and Prize and the Royal Medal. Dalitz was awarded the 1980 J. Robert Oppenheimer Memorial Prize.
