= List of fellows of the Royal Society elected in 1960 =

This is a list of people elected Fellow of the Royal Society in 1960.

== Fellows ==
- Alfred Maurice Binnie
- Robert Hanbury Brown
- Sir Derman Guy Christopherson
- Richard Henry Dalitz
- James Norman Davidson
- Michael James Stewart Dewar
- Sir William Stewart Duke-Elder
- Louis Essen
- Sir David Gwynne Evans
- Norman Leslie Falcon
- Peter Alfred Gorer
- Oscar Victor Sayer Heath
- Sir Ronald Holroyd
- Hugh Esmor Huxley
- Sir John Cowdery Kendrew
- John Alwyne Kitching
- David Keith Chalmers Macdonald
- Sir George White Pickering
- George Porter, Baron Porter of Luddenham
- Klaus Friedrich Roth
- Thiruvenkata Rajendra Seshadri
- James Haward Taylor
- Albert Alan Townsend
- Ralph Louis Wain
- Edward Nevill Willmer

== Foreign members ==
- George Wells Beadle
- Ragnar Arthur Granit
- George Bogdan Kistiakowsky
- Lev Davydovitch Landau
