= Dalitz plot =

Particle physics plot of relative frequency

Dalitz plot for a three-body decay of a spin-0 particle of the mass $M$ into three spin-0 particles of masses $m_1$, $m_2$, $m_3$. The grey area depicts the allowed kinematic region. The blue line shows a possible position of accumulation of events in case a spin-0 resonance is present as an intermediate state in this three-body decay, which then decays to particles 1 and 2. The orange line shows the position of accumulation of events in case another spin-0 resonance is present, decaying to particles 1 and 3.

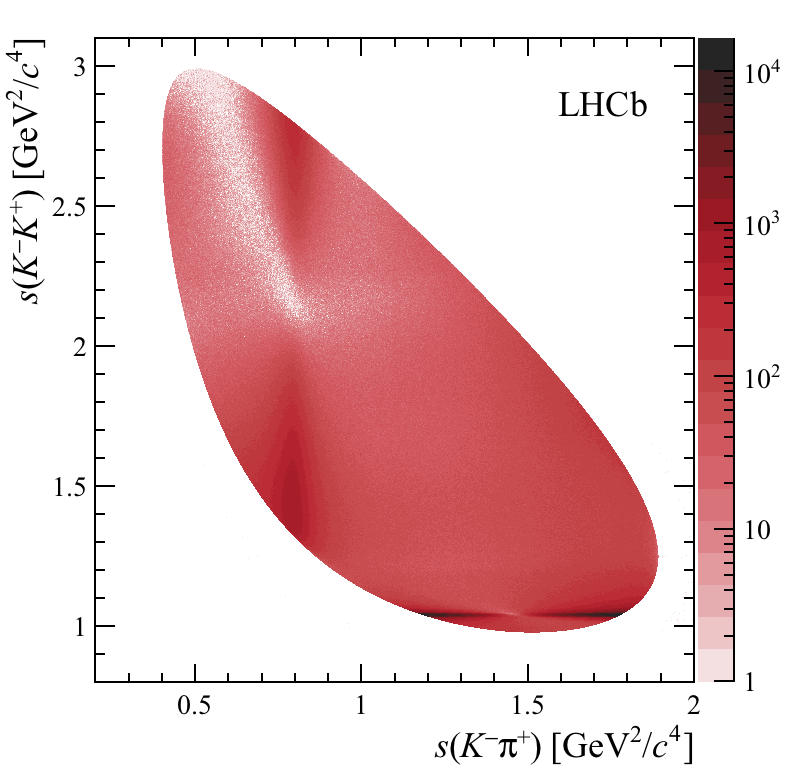
Dalitz plot for the decay $D^+ \to K^+ K^- \pi^+$ in data of the LHCb experiment at CERN. Clear resonances $K^{*0}$ (vertical region of enhancement) and $\phi$ (horizontal enhancement) can be seen. Distribution of events around resonant regions is not uniform due to spin 1 of the resonances, and interference between the resonant and non-resonant processes.

The Dalitz plot is a two-dimensional plot often used in particle physics to represent the relative frequency of various (kinematically distinct) manners in which the products of certain (otherwise similar) three-body decays may move apart.

The phase-space of a decay of a pseudoscalar into three spin-0 particles can be completely described using two variables. In a traditional Dalitz plot, the axes of the plot are the squares of the invariant masses of two pairs of the decay products. For example, if particle A decays to particles 1, 2, and 3, a Dalitz plot for this decay could plot m^{2}_{12} on the x-axis and m^{2}_{23} on the y-axis. The third squared invariant mass, m^{2}_{13}, is not an independent variable and can be written as a linear function of the former two quantities. If there are no angular correlations between the decay products then the distribution of these variables is flat. However symmetries may impose certain restrictions on the distribution. Furthermore, three-body decays are often dominated by resonant processes, in which the particle decays into two decay products, with one of those decay products immediately decaying into two additional decay products. In this case, the Dalitz plot will show a non-uniform distribution, with a peak around the mass of the resonant decay. In this way, the Dalitz plot provides an excellent tool for studying the dynamics of three-body decays.

Dalitz plots play a central role in the discovery of new particles in current high-energy physics experiments, including Higgs boson research, and are tools in exploratory efforts that might open avenues beyond the Standard Model.

R.H. Dalitz introduced this technique in 1953 to study decays of K mesons (which at that time were still referred to as "tau-mesons"). It can be adapted to the analysis of four-body decays as well. A specific form of a four-particle Dalitz plot (for non-relativistic kinematics), which is based on a tetrahedral coordinate system, was first applied to study the few-body dynamics in atomic four-body fragmentation processes.

== Square Dalitz plot ==
Modeling of the common representation of the Dalitz plot can be complicated due to its nontrivial shape. One can however introduce such kinematic variables so that Dalitz plot gets a rectangular (or squared) shape:

$m'(1,2) = \frac{1}{\pi} \arccos\left(2 \frac{m(1,2)-m(1,2)_{\min}}{m(1,2)_{\max}-m(1,2)_{\min}} -1\right)$;

$\theta'(1,2) = \frac{1}{\pi} \theta(1,2)$;

where $m(1,2)$ is the invariant mass of particles 1 and 2 in a given decay event; $m(1,2)_{\max}$ and $m(1,2)_{\min}$ are its maximal and minimal kinematically allowed values, while $\theta(1,2)$ is the angle between particles 1 and 3 in the rest frame of particles 1 and 2. This technique is commonly called "Square Dalitz plot" (SDP).
