= Robert Barton (disambiguation) =

Robert Barton (1881–1975) was an Irish lawyer.

Robert Barton may also refer to:

- Robert S. Barton (1925–2009), American computer systems architect and designer
- Robert Barton (British Army officer) (1770–1853)
- Robert Barton (RAF officer) (1916–2010), Canadian flying ace of WWII
- Robert Barton of Over Barnton (died 1540), Scottish sailor and Lord High Treasurer
- Robert T. Barton (1842–1917), American lawyer, politician and writer
- Robert Barton (author), American actor, author and academic
