= Philip Murray =

Scottish-born American labor leader (1886–1952)

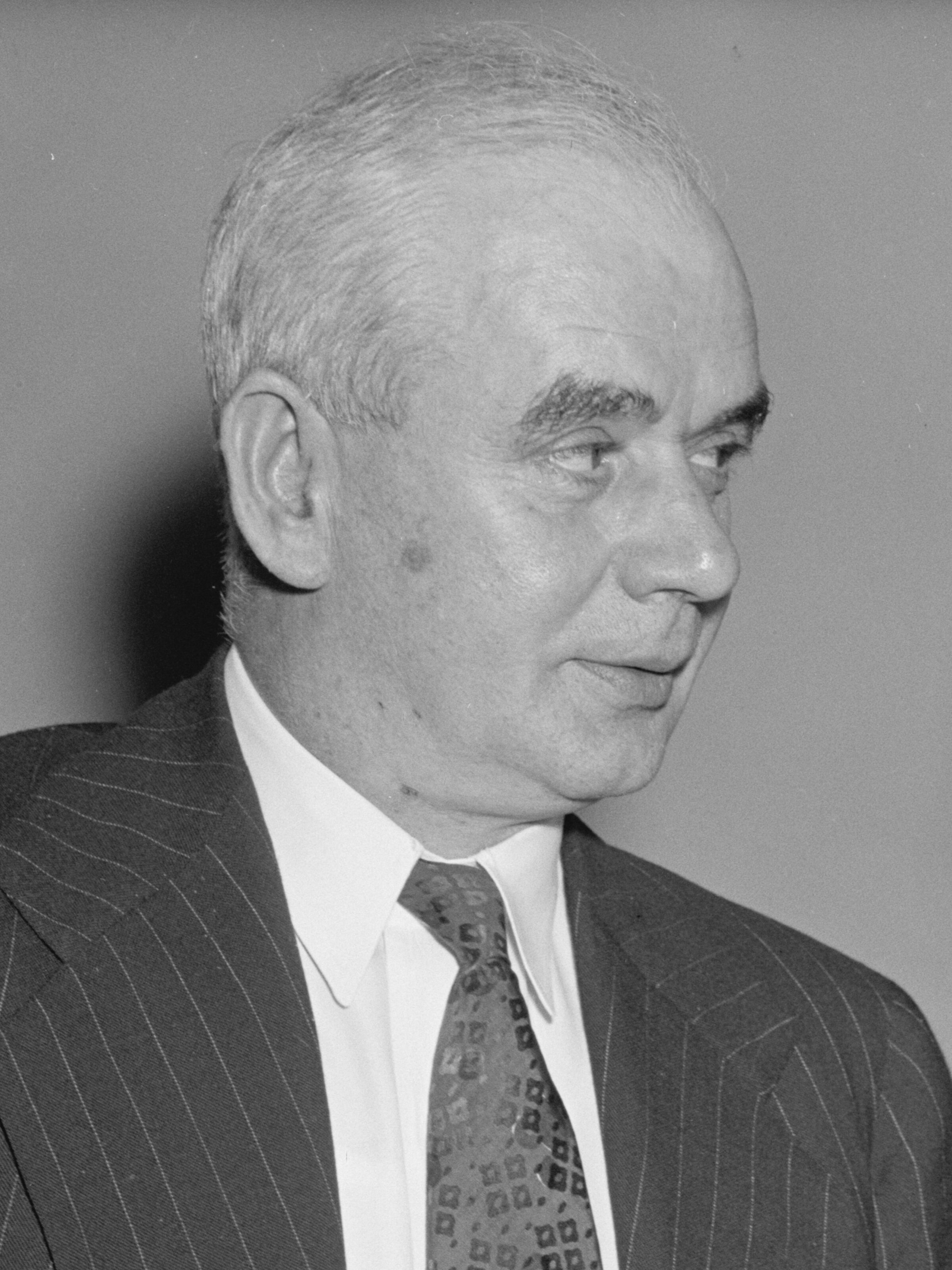
- Murray in 1938

2nd President of the Congress of Industrial Organizations
- In office November 23, 1940 – November 9, 1952
- Preceded by: John L. Lewis
- Succeeded by: Walter Reuther

1st President of the United Steelworkers
- In office May 22, 1942 – November 9, 1952
- Preceded by: Office established
- Succeeded by: David J. McDonald

Vice President of the United Mine Workers
- In office February 7, 1920 – May 22, 1942
- Preceded by: John L. Lewis
- Succeeded by: John O'Leary

Personal details
- Born: May 25, 1886 Blantyre, Scotland
- Died: November 9, 1952 (aged 66) San Francisco, California, U.S.
- Occupation: Labor leader

Philip Murray (May 25, 1886 – November 9, 1952) was a Scottish-born steelworker and an American labor leader. He was the first president of the Steel Workers Organizing Committee (SWOC), the first president of the United Steelworkers of America (USWA), and the longest-serving president of the Congress of Industrial Organizations (CIO).

== Early life ==
Murray was born in Blantyre, Scotland, in 1886. His father, William Murray, was a Catholic coal miner and union leader who emigrated from Ireland to Scotland prior to his son's birth. His mother, the former Rose Layden, was a cotton mill weaver. Rose died when Philip was only two years old. William Murray remarried and had eight more children. Philip was the oldest boy, and after only a few years of public education, he went to work in the coal mines at 10 to help support the family.

In 1902, Philip and his father emigrated to the United States. They settled in the Pittsburgh region and obtained jobs as coal miners. Young Philip was paid for each ton of coal that he mined. By the following year, they had saved enough money to bring the rest of the family to America.

== UMWA ==
Murray was working in a coal mine in 1904 when he became involved in the United Mine Workers of America (UMWA). Feeling that a manager had purposefully altered and lowered the weight of the coal he had mined, Murray punched the man and was fired. The other coal miners went on strike to demand his reinstatement. In response, the company threw Murray's family out of their company-owned home. Murray was shocked and angered by the company's actions. Convinced that unions were the only means workers had of protecting their interests, Murray became an avid and lifelong unionist.

In 1905, Murray was elected president of the UMWA local in the Pittsburgh area town of Horning, Pennsylvania. Determined to become the best local president he could, he enrolled in an 18-month correspondence course in mathematics and science. Although he had little formal education, he completed the course in just 6 months.

Murray married Elizabeth Lavery (the daughter of a miner killed in a mine accident) on September 7, 1910. They adopted a son.

In 1911, Murray became a naturalized citizen of the United States.

Murray, who favored co-operation with management rather than militancy, came to the attention of UMWA President John P. White. After White won the UMWA presidency in 1912, he appointed Murray to a vacant seat on the UMWA executive board. White then backed Murray in 1916 when Murray ran for president of UMWA District 5.

Despite his relative conservatism, however, Murray became a close associate of John L. Lewis. He supported Lewis's bid to become a UMWA vice president in 1917, and UMWA president in 1920. In return, Lewis appointed Murray to the position of vice president. Murray became a strong supporter of and assistant to Lewis. Lewis handled relations with employers and politicians, and Murray handled relationships with UMWA members.

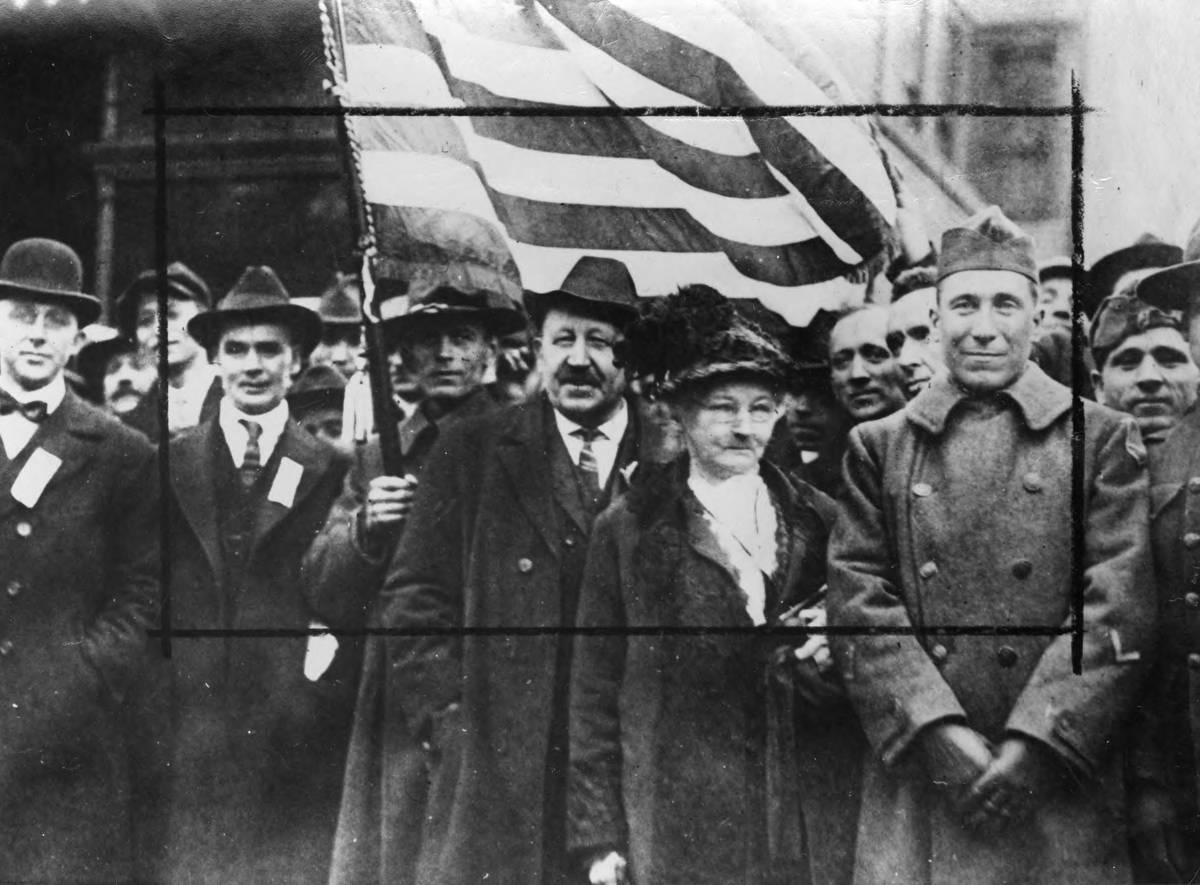
Murray (in box, far left), James H. Maurer, Mother Jones and William Z. Foster surrounded by steel workers and unionists in uniform during the 1919 General Steel Strike

Murray strongly supported America's entry into World War I and worked closely with government officials and employers to ensure that labor cooperated in the war effort. President Woodrow Wilson appointed him to the Pennsylvania regional panel of the National War Labor Board and the National Bituminous Coal Production Committee.

In the 1930s, Murray continued to serve on government committees. When General Hugh S. Johnson formed the Labor and Industrial Advisory Board in 1933 to implement Section 7(a) of the National Industrial Recovery Act, Murray agreed to serve on the new body. He played a key role in writing the "Bituminous Coal Conservation Act of 1935" (also known as the Guffey-Snyder Act), later struck down by the United States Supreme Court in Carter v. Carter Coal Co.

== SWOC ==
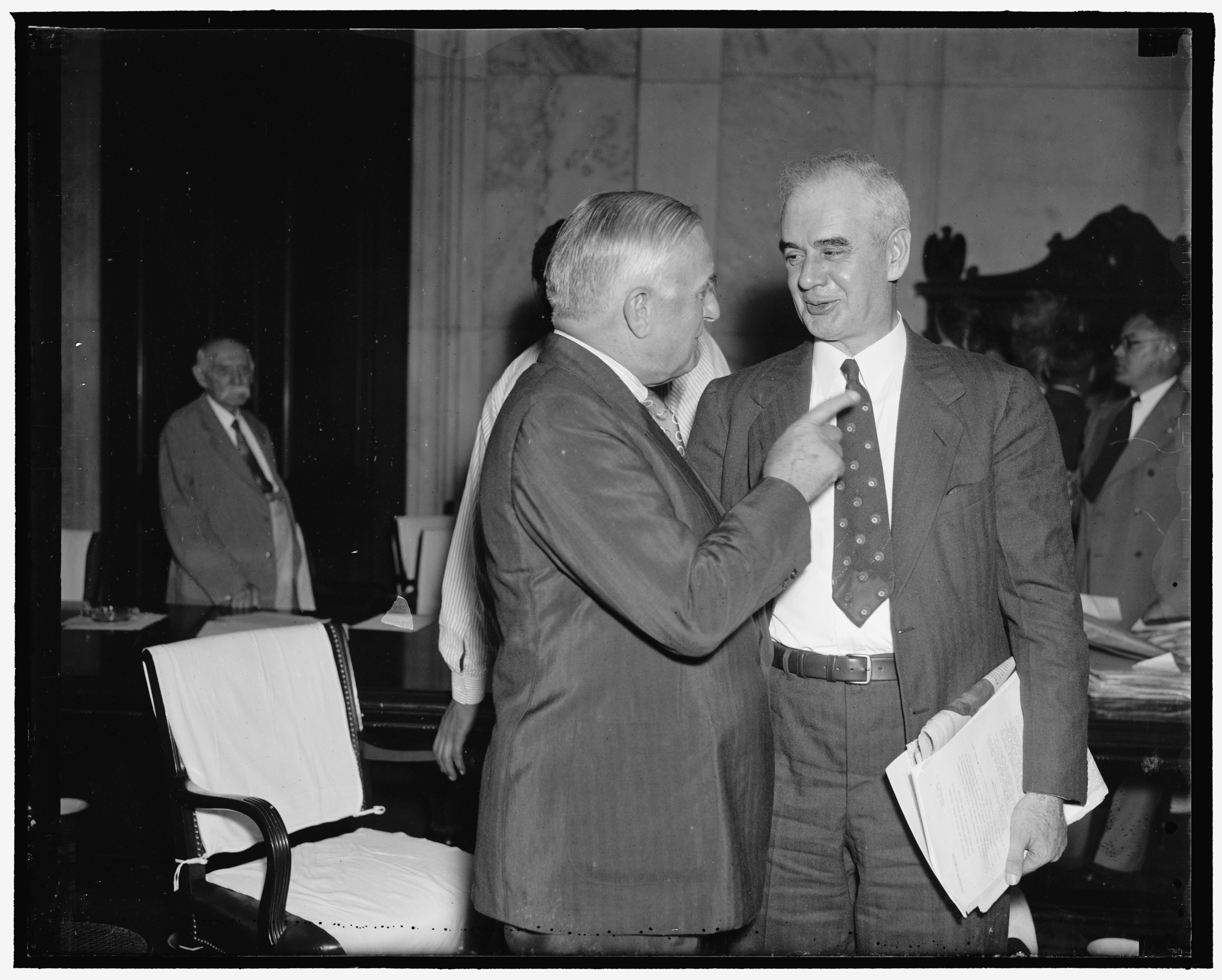
Senator Joseph F. Guffey (left) talking with Murray in 1937

Murray was active both in the CIO and in SWOC, the steelworkers' organizing project.

When the American Federation of Labor ejected the unions that composed the Committee for Industrial Organization (CIO) in 1936, Murray supported Lewis's decision to form a new labor organization and was named a vice president in the new CIO. When the Steel Workers Organizing Committee (SWOC) was formed in Pittsburgh, Pennsylvania on June 7, 1936, Lewis named Murray its chair. Murray oversaw a $500,000 budget and 36 (eventually 200) organizers.

Under Murray, SWOC made a dramatic breakthrough when, on March 2, 1937, it signed a collective bargaining agreement with US Steel. SWOC infiltrated the employer's company unions and turned them against the company, foregoing a traditional organizing campaign.

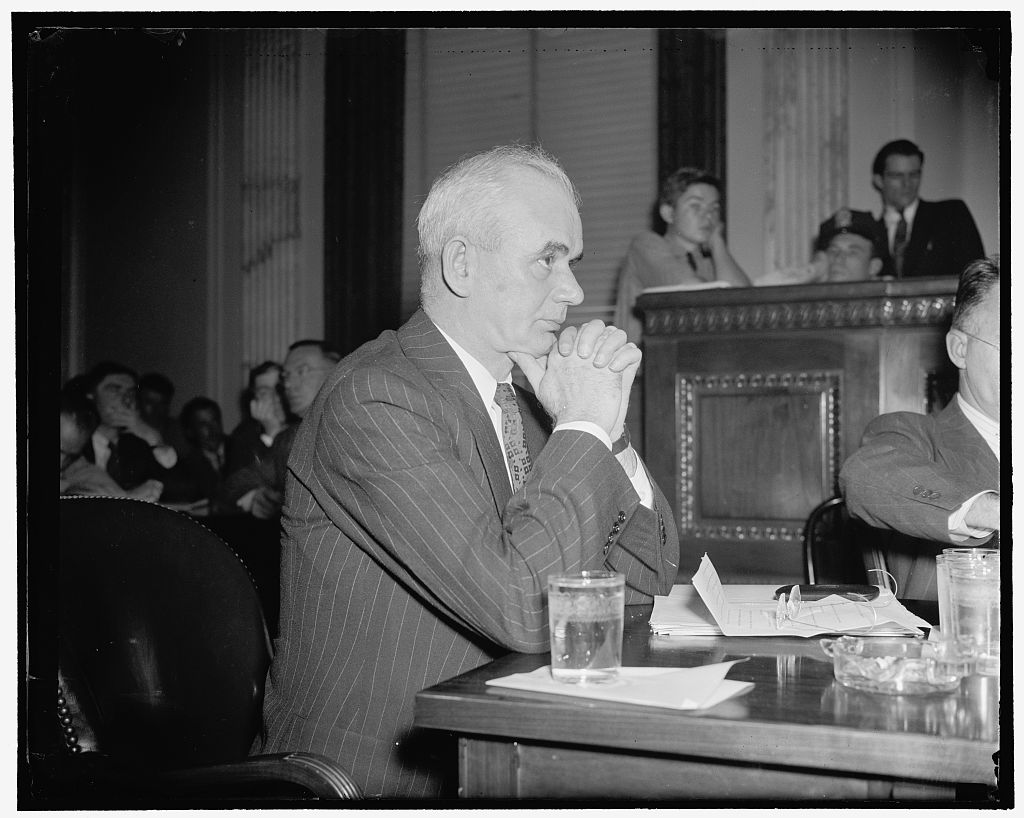
Murray testifying before Congress in 1938

Murray and SWOC suffered their first defeat when SWOC attempted to organize workers laboring for "Little Steel:" Republic Steel, Bethlehem Steel, Youngstown Sheet and Tube, National Steel, Inland Steel and American Rolling Mills. Employers used violence, espionage, and many strikebreakers to defeat the organizing drive.

Murray was elected second vice president of the CIO at its first formal convention in November 1938.

Organizing slowed after the initial burst of success at US Steel. By 1939, SWOC was in debt by $2.5 million. Little Steel continued to strongly resist unionization, and SWOC made few inroads at mills in the Deep South.

== CIO ==
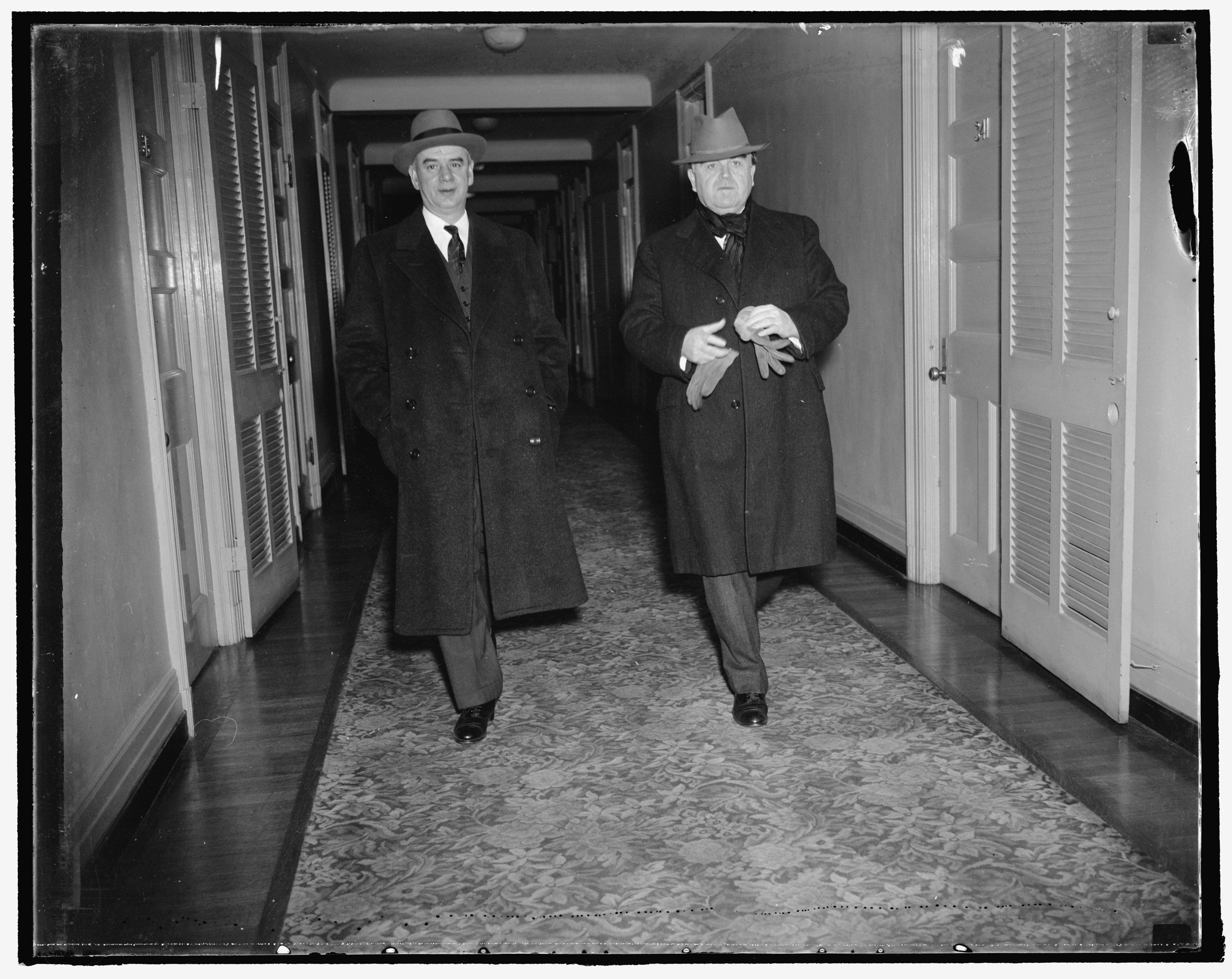
Murray (left) with John L. Lewis in 1937

When Lewis retired as CIO president in 1940, Murray was elected president as his successor. The CIO absorbed a large amount of UMWA's dues at a time when the ongoing Great Depression and employer resistance had stalled the influx of new members. Lewis soon broke with Franklin D. Roosevelt, over the need for war with Germany and Japan and with his CIO colleagues over the need for government protection, as embodied by the National Labor Relations Act. Lewis endorsed Wendell Willkie for president just 11 days before the 1940 presidential election and secured union members' support for Willkie by threatening to resign as CIO president if union members did not follow him. Despite a Lewis draft at the CIO convention two weeks after the November election, Sidney Hillman and other CIO leaders pushed for a Murray candidacy. Although Murray had supported Roosevelt in the election, Lewis placed Murray's name into nomination himself. Murray was elected president of the CIO on November 22, 1940.

=== Formation of USWA ===
Little Steel capitulated to SWOC in the spring of 1941. Walkouts involving tens of thousands of workers and adverse court rulings led to elections at Bethlehem Steel, Youngstown Sheet and Tube, and Inland Steel, and huge majorities voted for the union. Republic Steel quietly signed contracts soon thereafter. SWOC soon had more members than the United Mine Workers, further alienating Murray and Lewis.

The victories at Little Steel led Murray to transform SWOC into a real union. SWOC was disbanded at a convention held in Cleveland, Ohio, on May 22, 1942. A new organization, the United Steel Workers of America (USWA), was founded. Murray was USWA's first president. David J. McDonald, Murray's long-time aide at SWOC, became the number two man at SWOC, often running the union's day-to-day business. Together, they ran the union in a highly centralized manner that was not very democratic. All dues flowed to the national office in Pittsburgh, and the right to negotiate contracts and conduct job actions was strictly controlled. Such actions were justified, Murray argued, in light of the vigorous resistance to the union displayed by steelmakers.

=== Reform of CIO ===
Murray took over as president of the CIO, he found the federation in deep financial and organizational distress. He quickly instituted a series of reforms to stabilize it. He collected back dues from members and unions alike, reined in expenses, shuttered or cut off marginal organizing projects and unions, pulled organizers out of unions (who acted more like service representatives than organizers), and slowly ended the organization's dependence on subsidies from the Mine Workers. By November 1941, the CIO had a budget surplus. In late 1941, Lewis submitted a "bill" to the CIO demanding repayment for its five years of subsidies and began speaking to Murray only through intermediaries. The relationship between the two former friends soured quickly. When Murray transformed SWOC into USWA and installed himself as president, Lewis retaliated. On May 25, 1942, he forced the UMWA executive board to remove Murray as vice president and strip him of his union membership.

=== World War II ===
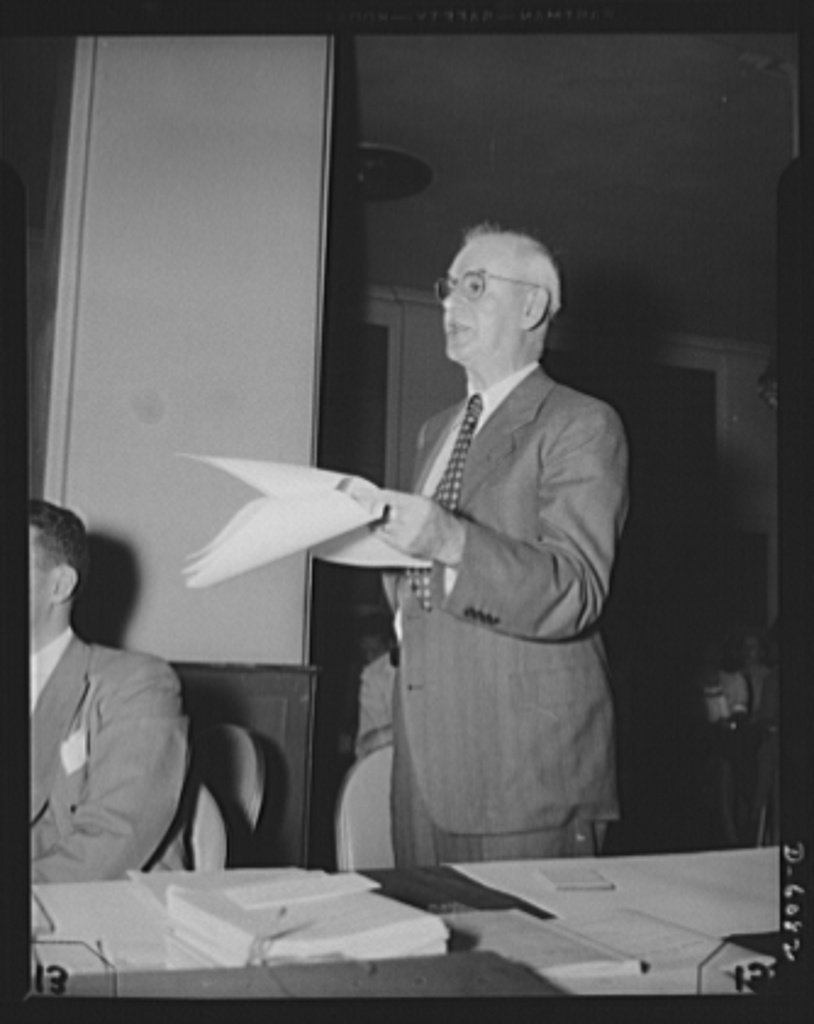
Murray speaking at the "Little Steel" hearing before the National War Labor Board in 1942

Murray strongly supported the Roosevelt administration and the war effort during World War II. He quickly adopted a "no strike pledge" on behalf of all CIO unions, and supported (with Walter Reuther) the establishment of industry union councils to promote increased production, quicker retooling, and overcoming design problems.

To help overcome racial tensions in war plants, Murray established the CIO Committee to Abolish Racial Discrimination (CARD). CARD quickly undertook a discrimination-awareness education program, which proved somewhat effective, at least outside the South. In 1943, Murray advocated making the Fair Employment Practice Committee a permanent government agency.

Murray also served on the National Defense Mediation Board and a number of other government agencies to help promote the war effort.

=== Post-war strikes and Taft–Hartley ===
In 1945, he attended the World Trade Union Conference in London alongside many renowned trade unionists.

Murray lead the Steelworkers out on strike in 1946. Employers said that they were unable to meet the union's wage demands under existing federal wage and price controls. US President Harry Truman established a fact-finding board to craft a settlement, eventually approving the price increases sought by business in order to finance the wage increases. The strike, which began in mid-January, was over within a month.

Murray had another fight on his hands in 1947 when the Congress enacted the Taft–Hartley Act over Truman's veto. In July 1943, Murray had established a permanent political action committee (PAC) within the CIO, the CIO-PAC, the first-ever PAC in the United States. The CIO's political efforts were only marginally effective. The Republican Party successfully passed the Taft–Hartley Act despite the vigorous opposition of Murray and the CIO.

After the act passed, Murray and the CIO were indicted for violating section 304 of the act, which forbade the expenditure of union funds in federal political campaigns. The CIO had endorsed a candidate for Congress in Maryland, and the US Department of Justice prosecuted Murray and the CIO for advertising the fact on the front page of The CIO News. In United States v. Congress of Industrial Organizations, the Supreme Court overturned the indictment and found that the publicizing endorsements was not an "expenditure" under the act. Representing Murray was Lee Pressman.

Murray also refused to sign the required anticommunist affidavit on the grounds that it was demeaning. Nevertheless, Murray was no radical, and he aggressively purged the CIO of 11 left-leaning unions in 1949 and 1950. In the 1948 presidential election, Murray refused to support former Vice-President Henry A. Wallace's third-party candidacy and accused Wallace and his Progressive Party of being supported and influenced by communists. Instead, both Murray and the CIO supported Truman and the Democratic Party.

Murray led the USWA through a second successful strike in 1949. Now, the issue was whether employers should bear the entire cost of workers' health benefits and pensions. Once more, the union and the employers sought the assistance of a federal factfinding board, but the board's recommendations did not prevent a strike from beginning on October 1, 1949 and lasting 31 days. Murray won a doubling of the pension benefit, with the employer continuing to pick up the entire cost. The USWA, meanwhile, agreed to pick up only half the cost of a new health and insurance benefit.

=== 1952 steel seizures ===
In 1952, Murray led the USWA in its most famous strike. National wage controls had been reimposed to keep inflation in check during the Korean War. In November 1951, USWA negotiators asked US Steel for a large 30-cent wage increase, improvement in fringe benefits, and a closed shop. The company responded that it could not agree without prior government approval of commensurate price increases.

Truman referred the dispute to the federal Wage Stabilization Board (WSB). Murray agreed to delay a planned January 1, 1952 walkout until the Board had made its recommendation. In March, the WSB recommended a 16.5 cent wage increase. US Steel and other steelmakers lobbied Congress, the Pentagon and the defense industry heavily, opposing any wage hike.

Congress threatened to overturn any Board agreement, but Truman refused to invoke the Taft–Hartley Act's cooling-off provisions or seek an injunction against the Steelworkers.

Instead, on April 8, 1952, President Truman nationalized the American steel industry.

The steelmakers sought an injunction preventing the seizure. After a preliminary hearing went in the government's favor, a federal district court judge enjoined the President from seizing the steel mills. The full Court of Appeals for the D.C. Circuit, sitting en banc, granted a stay of the injunction pending a decision by the Supreme Court to hear the case. A meeting between USWA and the steelmakers at the White House on May 3 nearly ended in agreement on a tentative contract, but the Supreme Court accepted the case and so the steelmakers backed out of the pact. On June 2, 1952, Justice Hugo Black, writing for a 6-3 majority in Youngstown Sheet & Tube Co. v. Sawyer, ruled that the president lacked the authority to seize the steel mills.

The government returned the mills to their owners hours later, and the Steelworkers went on strike for 51 days. The CIO, lacking a strike fund, was unable to help the Steelworkers. J Lewis triumphantly offered the union a $10 million line of credit, which humiliated Murray. Steel supplies finally began to dwindle, and Murray feared the public opinion might turn against the union for impeding the war effort. Truman began preparations to draft the steelworkers into the military under the provisions of Section 18 of the Selective Service Act of 1948, further weakening Murray's resolve to see the strike through.

An agreement was reached on July 24, 1952. The Steelworkers achieved only a limited version of the closed shop. Wages and benefits rose but not as much as the WSB had recommended, but Murray and others considered the strike a terrific win. They had avoided the crippling imposition of a Taft–Hartley injunction and its fines, and Truman had gone to significant lengths to support the union.

== Death ==
Murray was unable to savor his victory. In the November presidential election, Dwight D. Eisenhower won the presidential election, and Republicans swept to majorities in both houses of Congress. It was another defeat for the CIO-PAC.

Murray died in his sleep at the Mark Hopkins Hotel in San Francisco on November 9, 1952, of a heart attack. Reuther succeeded him as president of the CIO in December 1952, and McDonald succeeded him as acting president of the Steelworkers in November 1952. McDonald was elected to a full four-year term as president in February 1953.

Philip Murray was buried in Saint Anne's Cemetery in Castle Shannon, Pennsylvania.

== Other roles and publications ==
Murray was a civic-minded individual who participated on a wide number of nonprofit organizations. From 1918 to his death, he was a member of the Pittsburgh Board of Education. He was a long-time member of the National Association for the Advancement of Colored People and served on its executive committee. He also was a member of the board of directors of the American Red Cross.

Murray wrote one book in his lifetime: Organized Labor and Production was published in 1940.

Trade union offices
Preceded by John L. Lewis	Vice-President of the United Mine Workers of America; 1920–1942	Succeeded by John O'Leary
Preceded by John L. Lewis	President of the Congress of Industrial Organizations; 1940–1952	Succeeded by Walter Reuther
New office	President of the United Steelworkers of America; 1942–1952	Succeeded by David J. McDonald
