= Habeeb Salloum =

Canadian writer (1924–2019)

Habeeb Salloum, M.S.M. (9 March 1924 – 4 December 2019) was a prominent Arab-Canadian author and freelance writer. Salloum centered his writings on Canada, travel, and the culinary arts, Arab and world history, with a specific focus on cooking and tourism.

== Career ==
Salloum was a Canadian author who grew up in Saskatchewan, joined the RCAF during the Second World War, and then worked for the Canadian Department of National Revenue for 36 years. For the last 30 years of his life, he was a full-time author and freelance writer specializing in food, history, and travel. Besides 14 books and 20 chapters in books, he wrote at least 2,000 published articles about culture, food, travel, history and homesteading in western Canada that have appeared in such publications as the Toronto Star, the Globe and Mail, the Western Producer, Contemporary Review, Forever Young Information, Countryside & Small Stock Journal, Backwoods Home, Vitality, High On Adventure, and Saveur.

Salloum authored and co-authored fourteen books. Before his death, he worked on revising studies of Arabic contributions to the English and Spanish languages with his daughters, Muna and Leila. Habeeb wrote hundreds of articles on history, food, travel, homesteading in western Canada, and Arab-Canadian history. He was considered Canada's foremost expert on Arab cuisine and Syrian immigration to Canada.

During his travels, he experienced the cuisine of hundreds of different countries and wrote numerous articles about each country's food fare. Along with his writings on food, he focused many of his writings on each country's history and travel. Much of his writings focus on the cuisine, tourism, and history of the Mediterranean countries, Spanish (Latin)-speaking world, Canada, and Arabs living in Canada, specifically Arab pioneering and homesteading in western Canada. He also delved into the impact of Arab / Muslim Spain on the advancement of world history and contributions of the Arabic language on English and Spanish vocabularies.

== Personal life ==
Salloum was born to Jiryas Ya'qub Salloum (father) and Shams (née Saliba) (mother) in the Qaroun within Syria (after his birth this section of Syria became part of modern-day Lebanon). A few months later, he and his mother and older brother immigrated to Saskatchewan, Canada to join his father who had emigrated six months earlier. Salloum had three brothers and four sisters.

Salloum was raised in Saskatchewan on his family's homestead farm. During World War II (1943–1945), he served in the Royal Canadian Air Force. When he finished his time with the RCAF, Salloum came back to Canada and started a new life in the city of Toronto. In 1950, in Toronto, he married Freda (née Abourezk, or Bourzk).

In Toronto, Salloum worked for Revenue Canada, Customs and Excise, while at the same time pursuing his interests in literature, cooking and academics. Many years later, after retiring from Revenue Canada, he was able to become a full-time freelance writer and author. Once he began his new profession, he began his widespread travels around the world.

Salloum had three children, Muna, Leila, and Raji. He had four grandchildren, Laith, Mazin, Jinaan, and Shaadi, and five great-grandsons, Bilal, Tamer, Khadeen (Kaden), Kiaan, and Qais, and two great-granddaughters, Layal and Tala.

== Bibliography ==
=== Most significant works ===
- The Charm Unknown: A Translation of Iliya Abu Madi's al-Talasim, Toronto, January 1976
- Journeys Back to Arab Spain. Middle East Studies Centre. Toronto. 1994
- From the Lands of Figs and Olives: Over 300 Delicious and Unusual Recipes from the Middle East and North Africa (co-author James Peters). Interlink Books: New York. 1995
- Classic Vegetarian Cooking From the Middle East and North Africa. Interlink Publishing: New York. 2000
- Arabic Contributions to the English Vocabulary: English words of Arabic origin: Etymology and History (co-author James Peters). Librarie du Liban Publishers: Beirut. 1996
- Arab Cooking on a Saskatchewan Homestead: Recipes and Recollections. Canadian Plains Research Center, University of Regina: Regina. 2005. This book won the Cuisine Canada and the University of Guelph's Silver Canadian Culinary Book Awards in Winnipeg in 2006.
- Arabian Nights Cookbook: From Lamb Kebabs to Baba Ghanouj - Delicious Homestyle Arabian Cooking. Tuttle Publishing: North Clarendon, VT. 2010
- Bison Delights: Middle Eastern Cuisine, Western Style. Canadian Plains Research Center, University of Regina: Regina. 2010
- Scheherazade's Feasts: Foods of the Medieval Arab World. (co-authors Leila Salloum Elias and Muna Salloum). University of Pennsylvania Press: Philadelphia. 2013
- Sweet Delights from A Thousand and One Nights: The Story of Traditional Arab Sweets. (co-authors Leila Salloum Elias and Muna Salloum). I.B. Tauris: London, UK. 2013
- Asian Cooking Made Simple: A Culinary Journey along the Silk Road and Beyond. Sweet Grass Books/Far Country Press: Helena, MT. 2014
- "Arab Cooking on a Prairie Homestead: Recipes and Recollections From a Syrian Pioneer", University of Regina: Regina, 2017
- The Scent of Pomegranates and Rose water: Reviving the Beautiful Food Tradition of Syria. Vancouver: Arsenal Pulp Press, November, 2018.
- From the Land of Figs and Olives: Over 300 Delicious and Unusual Recipes from the Middle East and North Africa. New York: Interlink Publishing (Revised and Edited), forthcoming

=== Most recent cookbooks ===
- Scheherazade's Feasts: Foods of the Medieval Arab World. (co-authored with Leila Salloum Elias and Muna Salloum. University of Pennsylvania Press: Philadelphia. 2013
- Sweet Delights from a Thousand and One Nights: The Story of Traditional Arab Sweets. (co-authored with Leila Salloum Elias and Muna Salloum). I.B. Tauris: London, UK. 2013
- Asian Cooking Made Simple: A Culinary Journey along the Silk Road and Beyond. Sweet Grass Books/Far Country Press: Helena, MT. 2014

=== Chapters in books include ===
"A Birthday Party in Kuwait", in World Communities (ed. Elisabeth Plain), Toronto: Ginn and Company, 1977, pp. 180–199.

"Reception pour un nouveau-né au Koweit", in Villes et villages du monde, (ed. Elisabeth Plain), Toronto: Ginn and Company, 1979, pp. 180–199 (translation of 1977 publication "A Birthday Party in Kuwait", World Communities).

"George J.Salloum Family", in Neville, The Golden Years 1900–1980, Saskatchewan: The Neville Celebrate Saskatchewan Heritage Committee, 1980.

"Reminiscence of an Arab Family Homesteading in Southern Saskatchewan", Canadian Ethnic Studies, The University of Calgary, Volume XV, Number 2, 1983, pp. 130–138.

Contributor to The Recipes Only Cookbook, (ed. Carroll Allen), Toronto: Lorraine Grey Publications Limited, 1989, (7 recipes), pp. 57, 62, 89, 109, 126, 153, 208.

"Spanish Vegetarian Cooking Made Simple", Vegan Handbook, (eds. D. Wasserman and R. Mangels), Baltimore: The Vegetarian Resource Group, 1996, pp. 117–120.

"Satisfying Vegetarian Foods from Middle Eastern Lands", Vegan Handbook, (eds. D. Wasserman and R. Mangels), Baltimore: The Vegetarian Resource Group, 1996, pp. 121–125.

"The Wholesome Vegetarian Dishes of North Africa", Vegan Handbook, (eds. D. Wasserman and R. Mangels), Baltimore: The Vegetarian Resource Group, 1996, pp. 126–129.

"The Syrians" in the Encyclopedia of Canada’s Peoples (P.R. Magocsi, Editor), Toronto: University of Toronto Press, 1999, pp. 1241–1246.

"Why Travel", The Right Angle – English Skills For College Students, Anjou, Québec: Les Éditions CEC, Inc., 2000, pp. 38–42.

"Medieval and Renaissance Italy: Sicily", in Regional Cuisines of Medieval Europe (ed. Melitta W. Adamson), New York: Routledge, 2002, pp. 113–123.

"Moroccan Mint Tea", (ed. S.Bard, B.Nielson & J. Spear), Steeped in the World of Tea, Northampton, Massachusetts: Interlink Publishing Group, 2005, pp. 135– 137.

Salloum created new dishes at his home in Toronto, Ontario and spent much of his time traveling the world and authoring articles for each visit. His publications were found in newspapers and magazines across North America, the Middle East, Asia, and Europe.

== Awards ==
- Recipient of the Governor General of Canada's Meritorious Service Medal, 2018
- Winner of the 2013 Saskatchewan Tourism Travel Media Award, awarded by Saskatchewan Tourism on 10 April 2014

== See also ==
=== Archives ===
There is a Habeeb Salloum fonds at Library and Archives Canada. The archival reference number is R3183.
