= Frank Close =

Particle physicist

Frank Close OBE FRS FInstP
- Born: Francis Edwin Close; 24 July 1945 (age 81); Peterborough, Northamptonshire, England
- Education: University of St Andrews; Magdalen College, Oxford
- Scientific career
- Fields: Particle physics
- Workplaces: CERN; Rutherford Appleton Laboratory; University of Oxford
- Doctoral advisor: Richard Dalitz

Francis Edwin Close (born 24 July 1945) is a particle physicist who is Emeritus Professor of Physics at the University of Oxford and a Fellow of Exeter College, Oxford.

== Education ==
Close was a pupil at King's School, Peterborough. He took a BSc in physics at St Andrews University graduating in 1967, before researching for a DPhil in theoretical physics at Magdalen College, Oxford, under the supervision of Richard Dalitz, which he was awarded in 1970. He is an atheist.

== Career ==
From Oxford he went to Stanford University in California for two years as a Postdoctoral Fellow on the Stanford Linear Accelerator Center. In 1973 he went to the Daresbury Laboratory in Cheshire and then to CERN in Switzerland from 1973 to 1975. He joined the Rutherford Appleton Laboratory in Oxfordshire in 1975 as a research physicist and was head of Theoretical Physics Division from 1991. He headed the communication and public education activities at CERN from 1997 to 2000. From 2001, he was professor of theoretical physics at Oxford. He was a visiting professor at the University of Birmingham from 1996 to 2002.

=== Honours and awards ===
- He became a Fellow of the Institute of Physics (FInstP) in 1991.
- The Institute of Physics awarded him its 1996 Kelvin Medal and Prize, which is given "for outstanding contributions to the public understanding of physics".
- From 1993 to 1999, he was vice-president of the British Association for the Advancement of Science.
- He was appointed an OBE in 2000.
- Since 2003, he has been Chairman of the British team (BPhO) in the International Physics Olympiad, based at the University of Leicester.
- 2013 Awarded the Royal Society Michael Faraday Prize.
- He became a Fellow of the Royal Society (FRS) in 2021.

== Physics outreach ==
In addition to his scientific research, he is known for his lectures and writings making science intelligible to a wider audience and promoting physics outreach.

=== Christmas lectures ===
His Royal Institution Christmas Lectures in 1993, entitled The Cosmic Onion, gave their name to one of his books. He was a member on the council of the Royal Institution from 1997 to 1999. From 2000 to 2003 he gave public lectures as professor of astronomy at Gresham College, London.

=== Popular science publications ===
In his book, Lucifer's Legacy: The Meaning of Asymmetry, Close wrote: "Fundamental physical science involves observing how the universe functions and trying to find regularities that can be encoded into laws. To test if these are right, we do experiments. We hope that the experiments won't always work out, because it is when our ideas fail that we extend our experience. The art of research is to ask the right questions and discover where your understanding breaks down."

2010's Neutrino discusses the tiny, difficult-to-detect particle emitted from radioactive transitions and generated by stars. Also discussed are the contributions of John Bahcall, Ray Davis, Bruno Pontecorvo, and others who made a scientific understanding of this fundamental building block of the universe.

The Infinity Puzzle: Quantum Field Theory and the Hunt for an Orderly Universe (2013) focuses on the discovery of the mass mechanism, the so-called Higgs-mechanism.

2015 "Half-Life: The Divided Life of Bruno Pontecorvo, Physicist or Spy" A brilliant scientist who was privy to many secrets including having worked on the Anglo-Canadian arm of the Manhattan Project who disappeared suddenly and later appeared in Russia.

2019's Trinity: The Treachery and Pursuit of the Most Dangerous Spy in History recounts the life and the espionage of Klaus Fuchs who passed atomic secrets to the Soviets during the race for development of the nuclear bomb. He concludes that "it was primarily Fuchs who enabled the Soviets to catch up with Americans".

Too Hot to Handle discusses cold fusion.

Other books include An Introduction to Quarks and Partons, The Particle Explosion, The Particle Odyssey, The Cosmic Onion, Particle Physics: A Very Short Introduction, Antimatter and Nothing.

== See also ==
- Gresham Professor of Astronomy

== Works ==
Frank Close talks about The Infinity Puzzle on Bookbits radio.

- Close, Frank (1988). End: Cosmic Catastrophe and the Fate of the Universe. London: Simon & Schuster. ISBN 0-671-65461-6. (Published in the US as Apocalypse When?)
- Close, Frank (2007). The Void. Oxford: Oxford University Press. ISBN 978-0-19-922590-3.
- Close, Frank (2015). Half-Life: The Divided Life of Bruno Pontecorvo, Physicist or Spy. London: Basic Books. ISBN 978-1-78-074581-7.
- Close, Frank (2017). Theories of Everything: Ideas in Profile. London: Profile Books. ISBN 978-1781257517.
- Close, Frank (2022). Elusive: How Peter Higgs Solved the Mystery of Mass. London: Allen Lane. ISBN 978-0241521144.
- Close, Frank (2025). Destroyer of Worlds: The Deep History of the Nuclear Age, 1895-1965. London: Allen Lane. ISBN 978-0241700860.
