= Theatre Topics =

- Discipline: Performing arts
- Language: English
- Edited by: Noe Montez

Publication details
- History: 1991-present
- Publisher: Johns Hopkins University Press (United States)
- Frequency: Triannual

Standard abbreviations
- ISO 4: Theatre Top.

Indexing
- ISSN: 1054-8378 (print); 1086-3346 (web)
- LCCN: 91642721
- OCLC no.: 33895791

Links
- Journal homepage; Online access

Theatre Topics is a peer-reviewed academic journal established in 1991. It is an official publication of the Association for Theatre in Higher Education. The journal covers theater arts, with a focus on performance studies, dramaturgy, and theater pedagogy. It is intended to inform readers of notable trends on-stage and in performing arts education. The editor-in-chief is Noe Montez of Tufts University. John Fletcher at Louisiana State University serves as associate editor, Margherita Laera is the journal's online editor and Jessical Del Vecchio is the book reviews editor.

== Abstracting and indexing ==
The journal is abstracted and indexed in Arts and Humanities Citation Index, Avery Index to Architectural Periodicals, Bibliography of Asian Studies, Current Contents/Arts & Humanities, Dietrich's Index Philosophicus, Humanities Index, Humanities International Index, International Bibliography of Periodical Literature, and MLA International Bibliography.
