= Raja G. Khouri =

Lebanese born Arab-Canadian

Raja G. Khouri is a Lebanese born Arab-Canadian. He is an international consultant offering services in organizational development and capacity building, focusing on civil society and human rights work. He is president of the Canadian Arab Institute, a commissioner with the Ontario Human Rights Commission, Committee member of Human Rights Watch Canada, and co-founder of the Canadian Arab/Jewish Leadership Dialogue Group. Raja formerly served on several government and civil society bodies, such as Ontario's Hate Crimes Community Working Group (for the Attorney General and Minister of Community Safety and Correctional Services), the Minister of Education's Equity and Inclusive Education Strategy Roundtable, Pride Toronto Community Advisory Panel, and the Couchiching Institute on Public Affairs. He also served as national president of the Canadian Arab Federation in the period following the events of 9/11, where he engaged in extensive civil rights advocacy, policy-oriented research and public relations. Raja's earlier career included a senior management position at CIBC (human resources) and management consulting tenures in Europe and the Middle East. He has designed and chaired conferences, given and moderated lectures, given numerous media interviews, and published commentaries in journals and major Canadian dailies. In 2003 Raja published Arabs in Canada Post 9/11, an expansion of a study of Arab-Canadians the Federation carried out in 2001–2002.,
