= David J. McDonald =

American labor unionist (1902–1979)

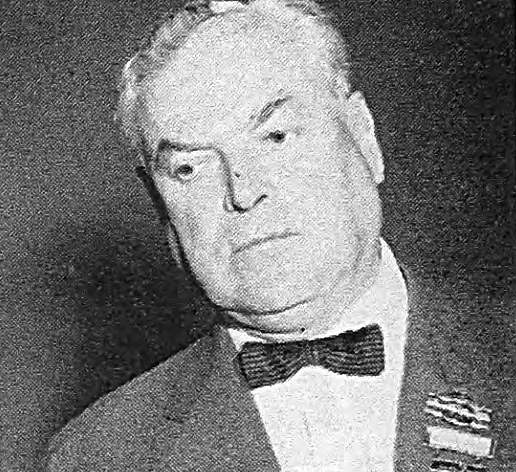
- McDonald in 1957

2nd President of the United Steelworkers
- In office 1952–1965
- Preceded by: Philip Murray
- Succeeded by: Iorwith Wilbur Abel

Personal details
- Born: November 22, 1902 Pittsburgh, Pennsylvania, US
- Died: August 8, 1979 (aged 76) Palm Springs, California, US
- Children: David J. McDonald Jr.
- Occupation: Labor leader

David John McDonald (November 22, 1902 – August 8, 1979) was an American labor unionist who served as the president of the United Steelworkers of America from 1952 to 1965.

== Early life ==
McDonald was born on November 22, 1902, in Pittsburgh, to David and Mary (Kelly) McDonald, Welsh immigrants. David McDonald Sr. was a long-time union activist who had been run out of Springfield, Illinois, because of his union activity. After failing as a saloonkeeper, McDonald Sr. got a job as a guide setter at a Jones and Laughlin Steel Company rolling mill and joined the Amalgamated Association of Iron and Steel Workers. Mary McDonald's father had been an officer in the Sons of Vulcan, an early ironworkers' union, and both uncles on his mother's side were unionists. The night that he was born, his father was walking a picket line.

He was educated in Catholic parochial schools. In 1915, his father was severely injured when a piece of hot steel impaled his left leg, causing him to be bedridden for 10 months and leaving him with a bad limp.

He got his first job as a paperboy at the age of 13 to help support the family, but his mother refused to let her son work full-time. He became an excellent student, singer and actor. He graduated from high school in 1918, receiving a two-year vocational technology diploma.

McDonald obtained a clerical job at the Jones & Laughlin mill, and later became a machinist's helper. In 1922, he became a typist-switchboard operator at Wheeling Steel Products Co. and studied accounting at Duquesne University.

McDonald married Emily Price in August 1937, who had been a secretary to Mine Workers president John L. Lewis. They had a son, David J. McDonald Jr., in 1939. The couple divorced in 1946. McDonald then married his secretary, Rosemary McHugh, in 1950.

== United Mine Workers ==
In 1923, a friend introduced him to Philip Murray, president of District 5 of the United Mine Workers. Murray hired him on the spot as his personal secretary, impressed with his typing speed and that McDonald had organized both the Holy Cross High School Alumni Association and Pittsburgh Catholic Alumni Association. The two become close friends.

McDonald enrolled at the Carnegie Institute of Technology, now part of Carnegie Mellon University, where he studied drama and dancing. He became an amateur actor and graduated in 1932. He was invited to come to Hollywood by Warner Brothers to discuss becoming an assistant movie director but turned down the offer.

== SWOC career ==
=== Secretary-Treasurer ===
In June 1936, Murray was named director of the Steel Workers Organizing Committee (SWOC). He named McDonald the union's secretary-treasurer. McDonald instituted tight financial controls and centralized dues collection and expense payments in the national headquarters.

In 1940, Murray was elected president of the Congress of Industrial Organizations (CIO). Although Murray retained the presidency of the Steelworkers, McDonald increasingly oversaw more than just the day-to-day operations of the union. In many cases, he made union policy, often substituted for Murray at public and union events, helped negotiate contracts, and represented the union at CIO events.

In 1942, SWOC merged with the Amalgamated Association of Iron and Steel Workers to form the United Steelworkers of America. Murray was named the new union's first president and McDonald its first secretary-treasurer.

The same year, Murray established a permanent political action committee within the CIO. McDonald was appointed to the executive council of the CIO-PAC, controlling its policies, endorsements and donations alongside Jacob Potofsky of the Amalgamated Clothing Workers of America, Emil Rieve of the Transport Workers Union of America and Emil Mazey of the United Auto Workers. He also served as the PAC's secretary-treasurer.

The AFL, the CIO, and the Railroad Brotherhoods went to Latin America to become familiar with the labor movements in other American countries at the behest of Bernardo Ibáñez Águila, secretary-general of the CATL. The delegation sent included Edward J. Brown, president of the International Brotherhood of Electrical Workers from the AFL, McDonald representing the CIO; and Samuel Phillips, vice-president of the Brotherhood of Locomotive Firemen and Enginemen from the Railroad brotherhoods. The trip included stops in Chile, Peru, Colombia, Panama, Cuba, and Mexico. The visit was a show of solidarity of international mutual co-operation with the goal of raising living standards across the Americas. The result of the trip was the creation of American Labor Conference on International Affairs.

Murray sent McDonald to England in 1944 to report on the war effort. While in London, a V-2 rocket killed 175 people in the apartment building next to his hotel. In July and August, he toured Normandy as American troops broke out from their beachheads during Operation Cobra, and his group came under artillery fire several times. The experience deeply moved him, and he urged the CIO to renew its "no-strike" pledge and redouble its efforts to support the war effort.

In 1946, McDonald was one of several union leaders within the CIO who pushed for a major organizing drive in the Deep South. In March 1946, the CIO established the Southern Organizing Committee, and McDonald was its secretary-treasurer and one of its executive board members. Although McDonald had urged the organizing effort, he later criticized it for being underfunded and understaffed.

Murray increasingly resented McDonald's influence within the Steelworkers, however. The relationship between Murray and McDonald became strained. In 1950, Murray won passage of an amendment to the Steelworkers' constitution to curb McDonald's powers. Murray played a key role in the 1952 steel strike, centralizing the union's picketing, demonstrations, leafletting, bannering, job actions, and public statements more in the national headquartas well as educating local and district leaders on the union's collective bargaining strategy and tactics.

Murray was a strong supporter of the National Labor Relations Act and believed the Taft-Hartley Act in 1947 significantly weakened union organizing prospects.

=== Presidency ===
Philip Murray died in November 1952, and McDonald was named acting president by the USWA executive board. Although observers felt that Murray had intended to push McDonald out of the union, his sudden death left McDonald in a position to take control. In 1953, the USWA executive board named McDonald president.

As president, McDonald emphasized enhancing fringe benefit. The election of Dwight D. Eisenhower as president and the advent of Republican majorities in the United States Congress (at least from 1952 to 1954) made expansion of social programs unlikely even if some later occurred. To compensate, McDonald focused negotiations on benefits such as unemployment compensation, health insurance, pensions, tuition reimbursement, and more. Throughout the 1950s, however, McDonald often felt an intense rivalry with the Auto Workers (UAW). The UAW often won better wage and benefit packages than the Steelworkers, and were able to obtain the closed shop. McDonald's negotiating stands often reflected the interunion jealousy.

McDonald led the Steelworkers out on strike in 1956, winning substantial wage increases, unemployment benefits, and layoff rights, and improved pensions.

== 1959 strike ==
In 1959, McDonald led the union out on strike again. But the 1959 steel strike was both a victory and a disaster.

Prior to the strike, the major steel companies were reporting high profits. McDonald and Steelworkers general counsel Arthur J. Goldberg requested a major wage increase. But industry negotiators refused to grant a wage increase unless McDonald agreed to substantially alter or eliminate Section 2(b) of national contract.

Section 2(b) of the steelworkers' contract limited management's ability to change the number of workers assigned to a task or to introduce new work rules or machinery which would result in reduced hours or numbers of employees. Management claimed that this constituted featherbedding and reduced the competitiveness of the American steel industry.

McDonald characterized management's proposals as an attempt to break the union. Negotiations broke off, and the contract expired on July 1, 1959.

President Eisenhower asked both sides to extend the agreement and resume bargaining. McDonald and Goldberg offered to extend the contract by one year and to create a joint committee to study changes to Section 2(b) and to the contract's benefit structure. Steelmakers rejected the offer, and on July 15 500,000 steelworkers struck. The strike shuttered nearly every steel mill in the country. By the end of August, the United States Department of Defense voiced concern that there would not be enough steel to meet national defense needs in a crisis.

McDonald was beginning to feel pressure to end the strike from the AFL-CIO. George Meany was willing to support the strike, but not if it meant negatively impacting national security. The strike was also affecting the auto industry, which was threatening to lay off tens of thousands of Walter Reuther's members due to a steel shortage.

On September 28, 1959, Eisenhower met privately with McDonald and Goldberg, and threatened to invoke the back-to-work provisions of the Taft-Hartley Act. But McDonald was unwilling to budge on Section 2(b) without other concessions from the steelmakers. The steel companies, realizing they only needed to wait until Eisenhower forced union members back to work, refused to make any such concessions.

Eisenhower set in motion the Taft-Hartley machinery on October 9, and appointed a Board of Inquiry. However, Eisenhower limited the Board to clarifying the issues rather than recommending a settlement. Realizing that the strike could linger despite the provisions of Taft-Hartley, management offered a three-year contract with small improvements in pay and fringe benefits and binding arbitration over Section 2(b). McDonald rejected the offer. He proposed a contract similar to his proposal of early July, but reduced the union's wage and benefit demand and limited the contract to two rather than three years. Working off a plan devised by Goldberg, McDonald also proposed a nine-member committee consisting of three members from labor, management, and the public to study and resolve work-rule issues. Management rejected the new proposal.

The Board of Inquiry issued its final report on October 19 and declared that there was no chance of a negotiated settlement.

On October 20, the United States Department of Justice petitioned the federal district court for western Pennsylvania to an injunction ordering the steelworkers back to work. Goldberg argued that the Taft-Hartley Act was unconstitutional, but the district court ruled for the government on October 21. However, the court agreed to a stay of the injunction until the matter was fully settled. The union appealed to the Third Circuit Court of Appeals in Philadelphia, and lost again on October 27. The United States Supreme Court granted certiorari and set argument for November 3, 1959.

Meanwhile, a budding friendship between Goldberg and Kaiser Steel heir Edgar Kaiser led to an independent settlement between the union and Kaiser Steel on October 26. Although the Steelworkers won only a fractionally higher wage increase than the steelmakers had proposed, the settlement included the nine-member committee proposed earlier by Goldberg and McDonald.

On November 7, 1959, on the 116th day of the strike, the Supreme Court upheld the appellate court's findings. In Steelworkers v. United States, 361 U.S. 39 (1959), in an 8-to-1 per curiam decision, the court upheld the constitutionality of the Taft-Hartley Act. The justices affirmed the district court's injunction ordering the workers back to work for an 80-day cooling-off period.

McDonald reluctantly ordered his members back to work, but productivity slowed due to extremely poor relationships between workers and managers. The Taft-Hartley Act required management to make a last offer and for union members to vote on this proposal. Management proposed minimal improvements in wages and benefits and the elimination of Section 2(b). McDonald turned management of the union over to Goldberg, to concentrate the legal and bargaining work in one set of hands. Goldberg convinced the leadership of the union to reject the proposal, and members followed suit.

It was a dangerous tactic, one which could have broken the union if not for the support of Vice President Richard Nixon. Nixon planned to run for president in 1960, and offered his services in the hopes of negotiating a settlement which might win him labor's backing. The Board of Inquiry, meanwhile, reconvened on November 10 and issued a second report on January 6, 1960. The major issues, the Board said, remained the size of the wage increase and Section 2(b).

In December, Nixon met privately with the steelmakers and cautioned them that Congress would soon begin hearings on the steel strike. Neither Republicans nor Democrats would support the steel companies if the strike triggered an election-year recession, and Nixon urged management to accept the terms of the Kaiser Steel settlement. Industry executives agreed to a new contract similar to the Kaiser Steel settlement the last week of December.

On January 15, a new 20-month contract was signed. Section 2(b) was preserved. Workers received a 7-cents an hour pay increase, 4.25 cents an hour lower than the Kaiser Steel settlement and far lower than anything McDonald had demanded. For the first time, however, the union won an automatic cost-of-living wage adjustment as well as greatly improved pension and health benefits. McDonald trumpeted the settlement as great victory (given what might have happened).

In the long run, however, the strike devastated the American steel industry. More than 85 percent of U.S. steel production had been shut down for almost four months. Hungry for steel, American industries began importing steel from foreign sources. Steel imports had been negligible prior to 1959. Basic industries found Japanese and Korean steel less costly than American steel, even after accounting for importation costs. The sudden shift toward imported steel set in motion a series of events which led to the gradual decline of the American steel industry.

== Post-Murray relationship with the CIO ==
McDonald had a rocky relationship with the CIO under its new president, Walter Reuther.

McDonald strongly, actively and openly disliked Reuther. He opposed Reuther's plans to undertake a new wave of organizing and pushed for stronger support of mainstream Democrats rather than left-wing candidates. McDonald believed that the conservative trend in American politics indicated labor should retrench rather than expand aggressively. At the CIO convention in December 1952, McDonald nominated Allan S. Haywood, the CIO's 64-year-old director of organizing, as president. McDonald was supported by most of the CIO's independent local unions and Industrial Union Councils (the CIO's local central labor bodies). Reuther promised to create the office of executive vice-president and appoint Haywood to the position, a move with allowed him to eke out a win, with 54 to 48 percent of the vote.

Reuther followed through on his convention promise, and Haywood became the CIO's new executive vice-president but died suddenly in February 1953. McDonald quickly demanded for John V. Riffe, a veteran organizer with several CIO unions, to be appointed in Haywood's stead. Reuther acquiesced. McDonald then pushed Riffe, who was in ill health, to promote McDonald's views within the CIO. McDonald also won a CIO staff position for his longtime personal assistant, Oral Garrison, who also pressured Riffe and reported on CIO affairs to McDonald.

Throughout most of 1953 and 1954, McDonald implicitly threatened to leave the CIO. He associated with Lewis, who had led his United Mine Workers out of the CIO in 1942 and back into the American Federation of Labor (AFL) in 1944, and he pointedly reminded the press and the CIO that the Steelworkers were an independent union, which would go its own way in politics, collective bargaining, and policy.

== AFL-CIO merger role ==
McDonald, along with USWA general counsel Arthur J. Goldberg, played a key role in the merger of the AFL and CIO in 1955. Murray had long disdained merger but had engaged in desultory merge talks on and off for much of his presidency. With the death of Murray on November 9 and AFL president William Green just two weeks later, the personality differences keeping the two labor federations apart seemed to disappear. Gone too were the paralyzing arguments over industrial unionism, organizing and civil rights. Both labor federations were organizing significant numbers of workers (including blacks), and many of the workers went into industrial unions.

AFL president George Meany and CIO president Walter Reuther began unity talks in earnest in January 1953. A no-raid pact was produced in the fall of that year. McDonald, however, pressed Reuther for quicker action and intimated that the USWA would pull out of the CIO if the merger was not effectuated immediately. While hinting that the Steelworkers might withhold dues money from the CIO to recoup loans it had made to the federation, McDonald publicly and brazenly pulled USWA organizers from CIO projects.

McDonald's influence weakened Reuther's attempts to win strong guarantees on civil rights, union corruption, and industrial unionism in the unity talks. In September 1954, McDonald demanded that the CIO abandon its demands in the areas and merge. Reuther, unable to stand up to McDonald any longer, settled for a paper statements against corruption and racial discrimination. There were no mechanisms to enforce the lofty goals, and many AFL unions continued to segregate blacks and engage in racist practices.

Jurisdictional dispute resolution mechanisms, too, were put off, to be established later by the new organization's executive council. Aggressive AFL industrial unions, such as the Teamsters, were already pressing hard on CIO affiliates such as the United Brewery Workers, and the new organization held out little hope that the CIO affiliates would survive.

Reuther won constitutional inclusion of an Industrial Union Department to promote industrial unionism and organizing in the new federation. However, while Reuther advocated a 6-cent tax on CIO unions to fund the department, McDonald pressed for a 1- or 2-cent tax. When Reuther expressed interest in leading the new Industrial Union Department, McDonald proposed a USWA district director. Once more, McDonald won the day, and the Industrial Union Department, once envisioned as an organizing juggernaut, now became merely a research, publicity, and lobbying unit.

McDonald acquiesced in Reuther's selection of John W. Livingston as the AFL-CIO's new organizing director, but Livingston was merely a functionary and not an aggressive organizer, which was why McDonald approved of Livingston.

Although McDonald served as chair of the resolutions committee at the final CIO Convention in early December 1955, he nearly sabotaged the organization's final moments. Believing that Reuther had intentionally omitted reference to Lewis in his closing remarks, McDonald led the Steelworker delegation out of the auditorium during the closing ceremonies. Only a small number of remaining delegates gathered around the podium at the end to sing "Solidarity Forever."

== Final union years and death ==
Eager to avoid a repetition of the 1959 steel strike, McDonald worked with steel industry executives to widen the mandate of the new nine-member commissions (now known as "Human Relations Committees"). Goldberg had been appointed Secretary of Labor by President John F. Kennedy and used his influence to help McDonald. On January 13, 1961, the Steelworkers announced an agreement in which the Human Relations Committees would be empowered to negotiate on behalf of the union and the steelmakers. The three public members of the committees would act as mediator and factfinders and could make public recommendations of their own.

A new three-year national steel contract was signed on March 31, 1962. Goldberg associate Marvin Miller acted as a gobetween for the union and management, helping to ease tensions. The union agreed not to enforce Section 2(b) and permit increased automation, with a percentage of the profits from automation going to wage increases. In return, displaced workers would get employer-provided unemployment benefits, retraining, and rehire rights elsewhere in the company. In addition to retaining the cost-of-living wage increase, workers would get an across-the-board 2.2% wage hike. McDonald, however, was not involved in the negotiations. He left most of the discussions to subordinates on the various company committees/and to his legal staff.

In May 1962, at 60, McDonald received a bachelor's degree in industrial relations from St. Martin's College.

Union members, however, began to feel that McDonald was not protecting their interests. A brief recession led to layoffs, and McDonald negotiated job security provisions, which saved workers' jobs, but when the economy recovered in 1963 and 1964, industry profits did not lead to wage increases.

Under the constitutional provisions forced through by Murray in 1950, McDonald should have retired in 1965. However, he won passage of a constitutional amendment permitting him to serve two additional four-year terms.

In 1965, however, I.W. Abel challenged McDonald for the president. Abel had served as secretary-treasurer since 1952 and been a longtime McDonald supporter, but Abel strongly criticized the Human Relations Committees and promised a return to militancy to win higher wages and benefits for workers. The election was a bitter one and took place on February 9. Voting irregularities and challenged ballots delayed a final result until April 30. Abel relied heavily on voting and ballot-challenging procedures established under the relatively new Labor Management Reporting and Disclosure Act (or "Landrum-Griffin Act"). Without the assistance of the new law, it is unclear that he would have won, but union officials and federal monitors eventually declared Abel the winner by a razor-thin margin of 10,142 votes out of 600,678 cast, and on May 20 McDonald declined to challenge the result. Over 7,000 of the votes came from Canadian locals, and Abel spent a greater amount of time than any of his predecessors protecting the interests of Canadian steelworkers locals. Abel was sworn in as president on June 2, 1965.

McDonald retired to California. In 1969, he published his autobiography, Union Man: The Life of a Labor Statesman. Although union members voted to invite him to their convention in 1966, Abel did not ask for him to come. When the USWA held its convention in Las Vegas, Nevada, in 1976, McDonald was not invited to attend.

McDonald died in Palm Springs, California, and was buried at Desert Memorial Park, in Cathedral City, California.

== Personality ==
McDonald was almost universally considered vain and self-important. Many union leaders felt he drank too much and was far too flamboyant.

He often appeared vainglorious and deceitful, masking his lack of contact with rank-and-file workers and his shaky grasp of conditions in the mills with boastful orations and alcohol-enhanced bonhomie.... he bullied or cajoled wildcat strikers, sweet-talked government officials and corporate executives, and appeared endlessly at rallies, bond drives, broadcasts, and press conferences....

He enjoyed classical music, purchased high-end electronic stereo equipment, patronized jazz clubs, and was a member of Pittsburgh's expensive and fashionable Duquesne Club.

== Notes ==
Trade union offices
| Preceded by Philip Murray | President of the United Steelworkers of America; 1952–1965 | Succeeded by I. W. Abel |
| Preceded by Joseph A. Beirne; William C. Doherty | AFL-CIO delegate to the Trades Union Congress; 1960; With: Lee W. Minton | Succeeded by Karl Feller; George McGregor Harrison |
