= David J. McDonald Jr. =

Drama professor (1939-2017)

David John McDonald Jr. (July 1, 1939 – October 29, 2017) was an American literary critic who was Professor of Drama at University of California, Irvine. He received his B.A. from the University of Notre Dame, his M.F.A. at the Yale School of Drama, and his PhD from Stanford University. He retired from UC-Irvine's faculty in 2004, when he was named professor emeritus.

== Biography ==
McDonald was born in Pittsburgh, Pennsylvania, to David J. McDonald, the secretary treasurer of the Steel Workers Organizing Committee and future president of the United Steelworkers of America and Emily Price. He was married to Maura McDonald and they had two sons, Sean McDonald and Charles McDonald.

David J. McDonald Jr. died on October 29, 2017, at the age of 78.

== Career ==
McDonald began his career in the Department of Drama at UC Irvine in 1973, and was noted for his work bringing Jacques Derrida's theory of Deconstruction to the study of drama in the United States. He was an early collaborator with the "School of Criticism and Theory", most notably with Murray Krieger, founded at UC Irvine in 1976 and now at Cornell University.

Throughout the 1970s and 1980s, he directed and performed in numerous plays with the university's Fine Arts Workshop. He was also instrumental in bringing celebrated visiting scholars to UC Irvine, including Jacques Derrida, Jerzy Grotowski, and Robert Weimann.

In the early 1980s he served as editor of Theatre Journal.

In 1987 he was appointed Founding Director of UCHRI, the University of California Humanities Research Institute, where he also served as a fellow from 1988-1989.

In the 1990s he drove the establishment of the UC Irvine Department of Drama's and UC San Diego's Department of Theatre's Joint Doctoral Program in Drama and Theatre, which was inaugurated in 2000.

McDonald delivered papers all over the world, and was noted for his work across a variety of fields: Dramatic Theory, Irish Drama, Theatre History, Playwriting. He was also a highly regarded teacher in all those fields.

== Sources ==
- Reinelt, Janelle G. and Roach, Joseph R., eds. Critical Theory and Performance. Ann Arbor, MI: University of Michigan Press, 1992. ISBN 0-472-06458-4
