= Theatre Journal =

Journal

- Discipline: Performing arts
- Language: English
- Edited by: Sean Metzger

Publication details
- Former name: Educational Theatre Journal
- History: 1949-present
- Publisher: Johns Hopkins University Press for the Association for Theatre in Higher Education (United States)
- Frequency: Quarterly

Standard abbreviations
- ISO 4: Theatre J.

Indexing
- ISSN: 0192-2882 (print); 1086-332X (web)
- LCCN: 79643622
- OCLC no.: 33895455

Links
- Journal homepage; Online access at Project MUSE

The Theatre Journal is a quarterly peer-reviewed academic journal covering the theatre arts, with articles from the October and December issues centering on a predetermined theme. It is an official publication of The Association for Theatre in Higher Education and is published on their behalf by the Johns Hopkins University Press.

== History ==
The journal was established in 1949 as the Educational Theatre Journal and obtained its current name in 1979. The American Educational Theatre Association intended the journal to serve the field of educational theatre and drama in a manner similar to how the Quarterly Journal of Speech and Publications of the Modern Language Association of America served the fields of speech and modern languages respectively. The founding editor-in-chief was Barnard Hewitt (University of Illinois at Urbana–Champaign). Other past editors include Oscar Brockett, James S. Moy, Sue-Ellen Case, Enoch Brater, William B. Worthen, Janelle Reinelt, Loren Kruger, David McDonald, Susan Bennett, David Román, Harry Elam, Jean Graham-Jones, Penny Farfan, Ric Knowles, Joanne Tompkins, and Jennifer Parker-Starbuck.

The American Educational Theatre Association changed its name to the American Theatre Association in 1971. In 1986, the American Theatre Association declared bankruptcy. Theatre Journal is now published by the The Association for Theatre in Higher Education, founded in 1986.

== Abstracting and indexing ==
The journal is abstracted and indexed in:

- Academic OneFile
- Academic Search Premier
- Arts and Humanities Citation Index
- Bibliography of Asian Studies
- InfoTrac
- International Index to the Performing Arts
- ProQuest databases
- VINITI Database RAS
- Scopus
