= Hoda ElMaraghy =

- هدى المراغي
- Born: Hoda Abdelkader ElGammal; 1945 (age 80–81); Egypt
- Education: Cairo University (BSc); McMaster University (MSc, PhD)
- Known for: Research in flexible and intelligent manufacturing systems
- Title: Canada Research Chair in Manufacturing Systems
- Spouse: Waguih ElMaraghy
- Awards: Order of Ontario (2015)
- Scientific career
- Fields: Mechanical engineering, manufacturing systems
- Institutions: University of Windsor; McMaster University

Hoda ElMaraghy CM OOnt (Arabic: هدى المراغي; born 1945) is an Egyptian-Canadian professor and director of the Intelligent Manufacturing Systems (IMS) Center at the University of Windsor in Windsor, Ontario which she founded together with her husband Prof. Waguih ElMaraghy in July 1994. In 1994, she was the first woman to serve as dean of engineering at a Canadian university. She is also the first Canadian woman to obtain a Ph.D. in mechanical engineering. She was appointed as Canada Research Chair (CRC) in manufacturing systems in 2002. She has published more than 450 articles. She received the order of Ontario in 2015, and is a Fellow of the Canadian Academy of Engineering.

== Personal life ==
She was born as Hoda Abdelkader ElGammal (Arabic: هدى عبد القادر الجمال) to a father from Alexandria and a mother from El Mahalla El Kubra. ElMaraghy family of her husband is the same family of Mustafa al-Maraghi, the former rector of Al-Azhar.

== Career ==
ElMaraghy got a Bachelor's with Honours in mechanical engineering from Cairo University, Egypt. She got a Master's and Ph.D. both in mechanical engineering from McMaster University in Hamilton, Ontario in 1972 and 1976 respectively. She was a Professor and founding Director of the Flexible Manufacturing Systems Centre at McMaster University until joining the University of Windsor as the Dean of Engineering in 1994. Her research on flexible manufacturing has helped manufacturers around the world adapt and respond to market changes.
