= Association for Theatre in Higher Education =

United States-based non-profit

The Association for Theatre in Higher Education (ATHE) is a United States–based non-profit membership organization whose mission is "To support and advance the study and practice of theatre and performance in higher education." It publishes Theatre Journal and Theatre Topics, has 23 special interest focus groups, runs a job bank service for its members, and organises an annual conference attended by around 800 people.
