= D. R. MacDonald =

American novelist

- Born: David R. MacDonald; 1939 (age 86–87); Boularderie, Nova Scotia
- Occupations: Novelist, short story writer
- Writing career
- Period: 1980s–present
- Notable works: Cape Breton Road, Lauchlin of the Bad Heart

D. R. MacDonald is the pen name of David R. MacDonald, a Canadian-American writer who publishes novels and short stories. Born on Boularderie Island, Nova Scotia and raised in Ohio, he is a professor emeritus of creative writing at Stanford University. He still spend summers at the family homestead in Cape Breton Island, which he purchased in 1971, and his fiction is set in Cape Breton.

His novel Lauchlin of the Bad Heart was a longlisted nominee for the Scotiabank Giller Prize in 2007.

== Works ==
- Eyestone (1988, short stories)
- Cape Breton Road (2001, novel)
  - in German: Die Straße nach Cape Breton. Transl. Heidi Zerning. S. Fischer, Francfort 2002
- All the Men Are Sleeping (2002, short stories)
- Lauchlin of the Bad Heart (2007, novel)
- Anna From Away (2012, novel)
- The Ice Bridge (2013, novel)
