= D. K. C. MacDonald =

Scottish physicist

D. K. C. MacDonald FRS FRSE FRSC

Head, Low Temperature and Solid State Physics Group, National Research Council, Canada
- In office 1951 – 28 July 1963

Personal details
- Born: David Keith Chalmers MacDonald; 24 July 1920 Glasgow, Scotland
- Died: 28 July 1963 (aged 43) Canada
- Occupation: Physicist, cryogenicist

David Keith Chalmers MacDonald (24 July 1920 – 28 July 1963) was a Scottish-born metal physicist, cryogenicist and scientific author. He is considered as one of the founding fathers of modern cryogenics.

The MacDonald Memorial Lecture at the University of Manitoba is named in his honour. In authorship he is known as D. K. C. MacDonald, but friends knew him as Keith MacDonald.

== Life ==
He was born on 24 July 1920 in Glasgow the son of George MacDonald, an engineer in Halley's Industrial Motors, a company run by his father-in-law. The family moved to Edinburgh in 1933 and his secondary education was at Edinburgh Academy. He then studied physics at the University of Edinburgh, where he gained a PhD in 1946. That same year he moved to Oxford as a Research Fellow.

In the Second World War he served in the REME as an Instructor at the Military College of Science in Bury.

In 1950 he emigrated to Canada to work as Director of the Cryogenic Laboratory in Ottawa.

In 1954 he was elected a Fellow of the Royal Society of Edinburgh. His proposers were John F. Allen, Edward R. Andrew, Dirk ter Haar and Max Born. In 1960 he was also made a Fellow of the Royal Society of London and in Ottawa he was made a Fellow of the Royal Society of Canada.

The University of Ottawa awarded him an honorary professorship shortly before he died. He died of a rare neurological ailment in Ottawa on 28 July 1963.

He was of a nervous disposition and had a morbid fear of moths.

== Publications ==
- Near Zero (1961)
- Thermoelectricity (1962)
- Noise and Fluctuations (1962)
- Introductory Statistical Mechanics for Physicists (1963)
- Faraday, Maxwell and Kelvin (1964)

== Family ==
He married Moira Lawrie the daughter of his neighbour in Edinburgh and his teenage sweetheart.
