= Search for the Higgs boson =

Effort to prove or disprove the existence of particle

The search for the Higgs boson was a 40-year effort by physicists to prove the existence or non-existence of the Higgs boson, first theorised in the 1960s. The Higgs boson was the last unobserved fundamental particle in the Standard Model of particle physics, and its discovery was described as being the "ultimate verification" of the Standard Model. In March 2013, the Higgs boson was officially confirmed to exist.

This confirmed answer proved the existence of the hypothetical Higgs field—a field of immense significance that is hypothesised as the source of electroweak symmetry breaking and the means by which elementary particles acquire mass. (Note: The Higgs field is not responsible for all mass, but only for the masses of elementary particles. For example, only about 1% of the mass of baryons (composite particles such as the proton and neutron) is due to the Higgs mechanism acting to produce the invariant mass of quarks. The rest is the mass added by quantum chromodynamics binding energy, which is the sum of the kinetic energies of quarks and the energies of the massless gluons mediating the strong interaction inside the baryons. Without the Higgs field, the Standard Model says that elementary fermions such as quarks and electrons would be massless.) Symmetry breaking is considered proven but confirming exactly how this occurs in nature is a major unanswered question in physics. Proof of the Higgs field (by observing the associated particle) validates the final unconfirmed part of the Standard Model as essentially correct, avoiding the need for alternative sources for the Higgs mechanism. Evidence of its properties is likely to greatly affect human understanding of the universe and open up "new" physics beyond current theories.

Despite their importance, the search and the proof were extremely difficult and took decades, because direct production, detection and verification of the Higgs boson on the scale needed to confirm the discovery and learn its properties required a very large experimental project and huge computing resources. For this reason, most experiments until around 2011 aimed to exclude ranges of masses that the Higgs could not have. Ultimately the search led to the construction of the Large Hadron Collider (LHC) in Geneva, Switzerland, the largest particle accelerator in the world, designed especially for this and other high-energy tests of the Standard Model.

== Background ==
=== The Higgs boson ===
The Higgs boson, sometimes called the Higgs particle, is an elementary particle in the Standard Model of particle physics produced by the quantum excitation of the Higgs field, one of the fields in particle physics theory. In the Standard Model, the Higgs particle is a massive scalar boson with zero spin, even (positive) parity, no electric charge, and no colour charge, that couples to (interacts with) mass. It is also very unstable, decaying into other particles almost immediately.

=== Experimental requirements ===
Like other massive particles (e.g. the top quark and W and Z bosons), Higgs bosons decay to other particles almost immediately, long before they can be observed directly. However, the Standard Model precisely predicts the possible modes of decay and their probabilities. This allows the creation and decay of a Higgs boson to be shown by careful examination of the decay products of collisions.

Therefore, although approaches to proving the Higgs were studied in early research from the 1960s, when the particle was proposed, large-scale experimental searches only commenced in the 1980s, with the opening of particle accelerators sufficiently powerful to provide evidence related to the Higgs boson.

Since the Higgs boson, if it existed, could have any mass in a very wide range, a number of very advanced facilities were eventually required for the search. These included very powerful particle accelerator and detectors (in order to create Higgs bosons and detect their decay, if possible), and processing and analysis of vast amounts of data, requiring very large worldwide computing facilities. For example, over 300 trillion (3 × 10^{14}) proton-proton collisions at the LHC were analysed in confirming the July 2012 particle's discovery, requiring construction of the so-called LHC Computing Grid, the world's largest computing grid (as of 2012) comprising over 170 computing facilities in 36 countries. Experimental techniques included examination of a wide range of possible masses (often quoted in GeV) in order to gradually narrow down the search area and rule out possible masses where the Higgs was unlikely, statistical analysis, and operation of multiple experiments and teams in order to see if the results from all were in agreement.

== Experimental search and discovery of unknown boson ==
=== Early limits ===
During the early 1970s there were only few constraints on the existence of the Higgs boson. The limits that did exist came from the absence of the observation of Higgs related effects in nuclear physics, neutron stars, and neutron scattering experiments. This resulted in the conclusion that the Higgs—if it existed—was heavier than 18.3 MeV/c^{2}.

=== Early collider phenomenology ===
In the mid-1970s, the first studies exploring how the Higgs boson may show itself in particle collision experiments were published. However, the prospect of actually finding the particle were not very good; the authors of one of the first articles on Higgs phenomenology warned:

We should perhaps finish our paper with an apology and a caution. We apologize to experimentalists for having no idea what is the mass of the Higgs boson, ..., and for not being sure of its couplings to other particles, except that they are probably all very small. For these reasons, we do not want to encourage big experimental searches for the Higgs boson, but we do feel that people doing experiments vulnerable to the Higgs boson should know how it may turn up.

— John R. Ellis, Mary K. Gaillard, and Dimitri V. Nanopoulos,

One of the problems was that at the time there was almost no clue to the mass of the Higgs boson. Theoretical considerations left open a very wide range somewhere between 10 GeV/c^{2} and 1000 GeV/c^{2} with no real indication where to look.

=== Large Electron–Positron Collider ===
In the early planning studies for the Large Electron–Positron Collider (LEP) at CERN, the Higgs boson played no role. In fact, it does not appear to be mentioned in any of the reports until 1979. The first detailed study examining the possibilities of discovering the Higgs boson at LEP appeared in 1986. Thereafter the search for the Higgs boson became firmly established within the LEP program.

As its name implies, the Large Electron–Positron Collider collided electrons with positrons. The three most important ways in which such a collision could lead to the production of a Higgs boson were:

- The electron and the positron together produce a Z boson which in turn decay to a Higgs boson and a pair of fermions.
- The electron and the positron together produce a Z boson which in turn radiates away a Higgs boson. (Higgs strahlung)
- The electron and the positron exchange a W or Z boson which along the way emits a Higgs boson.

The fact that no decays of the Z boson to the Higgs were observed at LEP immediately implies that the Higgs boson, if it existed, must be heavier than the Z boson (~91 GeV/c^{2}). Subsequently, with each successive energy upgrade of the LEP, hope re-emerged that discovery of the Higgs was just around the corner. Just prior to the planned shut down of LEP in 2000, few events that resemble a Higgs boson with a mass of ~115 GeV/c^{2} were observed. This led to extension of the final LEP run by a few months. But in the end the data was inconclusive and insufficient to justify another run after the winter break and the difficult decision was made to shut down and dismantle LEP to make room for the new Large Hadron Collider in November 2000. The inconclusive results of the direct search for the Higgs boson at LEP resulted in a final lower bound of the Higgs mass 114.4 GeV/c^{2} at the 95% confidence level.

In parallel to the direct search program, LEP made precision measurements of many observables of the weak interactions. These observables are sensitive to the value of the Higgs mass through contributions of processes containing loops of virtual Higgs bosons. This allowed for the first time a direct estimate of the Higgs mass of about 100±30 GeV/c^{2}. This estimate however is subject to the condition that the Standard Model is all there is, and no physics beyond the Standard Model come into play at these energy levels. New physical effects could potentially alter this estimate substantially.

=== Superconducting Super Collider ===
Planning for a new powerful collider to explore new physics at the >1 TeV scale had already started in 1983. The Superconducting Super Collider was to accelerate protons in an underground 87.1 km circular tunnel just outside Dallas, Texas to energies of 20 TeV each. One of the primary goals of this megaproject was finding the Higgs boson.

In preparation for this machine, extensive phenomenological studies were produced for the production of Higgs bosons in hadron colliders. The big downside of hadron colliders for search for the Higgs is that they collide composite particles, and as a consequence produce many more background events and provide less information about the initial state of the collision. On the other hand, they provide a much higher centre-of-mass energy than lepton colliders (such as LEP) of a similar technological level. However, hadron colliders also provide another way producing a Higgs boson through the collision of two gluons mediated by a triangle of heavy (top or bottom) quarks.

The Superconducting Super Collider project however was plagued by budget problems, and in 1993 Congress decided to pull the plug on the project, despite $2 billion having already been spent.

=== Tevatron ===
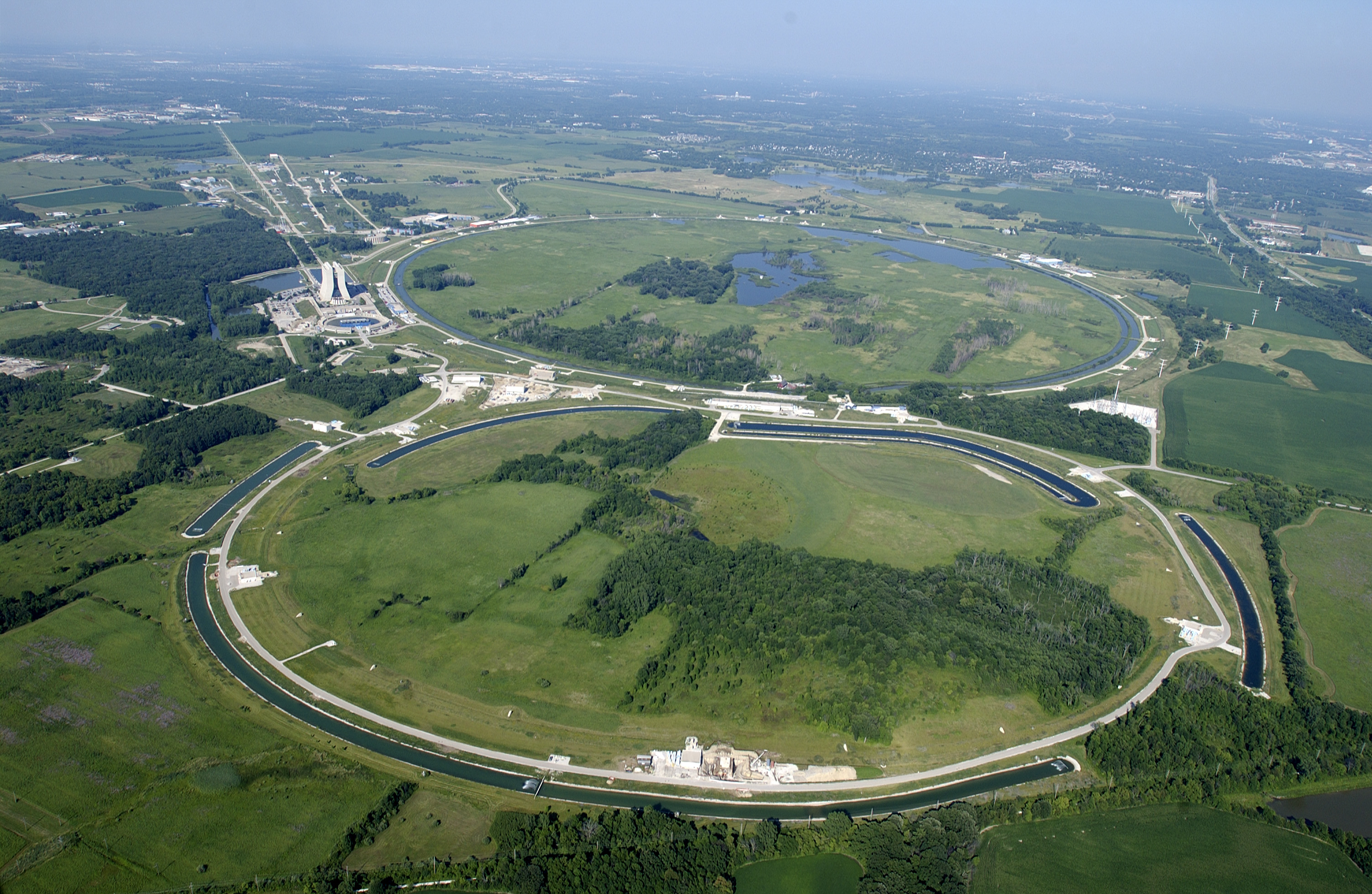
The Tevatron (background) and Main Injector rings

On 1 March 2001, the Tevatron Proton-antiproton (pp̅) collider at Fermilab near Chicago commenced its run 2. After run 1 (1992–1996), in which the collider had discovered the top quark, Tevatron had shut down for significant upgrades focused on improving the potential for finding the Higgs boson; the energies of the protons and antiprotons was bumped up to 0.98 TeV, and the number of collisions per second was increased by an order of magnitude (with further increases planned as the run continued). Even with the upgrades Tevatron was not guaranteed to find the Higgs. If the Higgs were too heavy (>180 GeV), then the collisions would not have enough energy to produce a Higgs boson. If it were too light (<140 GeV), then the Higgs would predominantly decay to pairs of bottom quarks—a signal that would be swamped by background events, and the Tevatron would not produce enough collisions to filter out the statistics. Nonetheless, the Tevatron was at the time the only operational particle collider that was sufficiently powerful to be capable of seeking the Higgs particle.

Operation was planned to continue until the Tevatron could no longer keep up with the Large Hadron Collider. This point was reached on 30 September 2011, when the Tevatron was shut down. In their final analyses, the collaborations of the two detectors at Tevatron (CDF and DØ) report that based on their data they can exclude the possibility of a Higgs boson with a mass between 100 GeV/c^{2} and 103 GeV/c^{2} and between 147 GeV/c^{2} and 180 GeV/c^{2} at a 95% confidence level. In addition, they found an excess of events that could be from a Higgs boson in the range 115–140 GeV/c^{2}. However, the significance of the statistics is deemed too low to base any conclusions on.

On 22 December 2011, the DØ collaboration also reported limitations on the Higgs boson within the Minimal Supersymmetric Standard Model, an extension to the Standard Model. Proton-antiproton (pp̅) collisions with a centre-of-mass energy of 1.96 TeV had allowed them to set an upper limit for Higgs boson production within MSSM ranging from 90 to 300 GeV, and excluding tanβ > 20–30 for masses of the Higgs boson below 180 GeV (tanβ is the ratio of the two Higgs doublet vacuum expectation values).

=== Large Hadron Collider ===
Full operation at the LHC was delayed for 14 months from its initial successful tests, on 10 September 2008, until mid-November 2009, following a magnet quench event nine days after its inaugural tests that damaged over 50 superconducting magnets and contaminated the vacuum system. The quench was traced to a faulty electrical connection and repairs took several months; electrical fault detection and rapid quench-handling systems were also upgraded.

Data collection and analysis in search of Higgs intensified from 30 March 2010 when the LHC began operating at 7 Tev (2 x 3.5 TeV). Preliminary results from the ATLAS and CMS experiments at the LHC as of July 2011 excluded a Standard Model Higgs boson in the mass range 155-190 GeV/c^{2} and 149-206 GeV/c^{2}, respectively, at 95% CL. All of the above confidence intervals were derived using the CLs method.

As of December 2011 the search had narrowed to the approximate region to 115–130 GeV, with a specific focus around 125 GeV, where both the ATLAS and CMS experiments had independently reported an excess of events, meaning that a higher than expected number of particle patterns compatible with the decay of a Higgs boson were detected in this energy range. The data was insufficient to show whether or not these excesses were due to background fluctuations (i.e. random chance or other causes), and its statistical significance was not large enough to draw conclusions yet or even formally to count as an "observation", but the fact that two independent experiments had both shown excesses at around the same mass led to considerable excitement in the particle physics community.

At the end of December 2011, it was therefore widely expected that the LHC would provide sufficient data to either exclude or confirm the existence of the Standard Model Higgs boson by the end of 2012, when their 2012 collision data (at energies of 8 TeV) had been examined.

Updates from the two LHC teams continued during the first part of 2012, with the tentative December 2011 data largely being confirmed and developed further. Updates were also available from the team analysing the final data from the Tevatron. All of these continued to highlight and narrow down the 125 GeV region as showing interesting features.

On 2 July 2012, the ATLAS collaboration published additional analyses of their 2011 data, excluding boson mass ranges of 111.4 GeV to 116.6 GeV, 119.4 GeV to 122.1 GeV, and 129.2 GeV to 541 GeV. They observed an excess of events corresponding to the Higgs boson mass hypotheses around 126 GeV with a local significance of 2.9 sigma. On the same date, the DØ and CDF collaborations announced further analysis that increased their confidence. The significance of the excesses at energies between 115 and 140 GeV was now quantified as 2.9 standard deviations, corresponding to a 1 in 550 probability of being due to a statistical fluctuation. However, this still fell short of the 5 sigma confidence, therefore the results of the LHC experiments were necessary to establish a discovery. They excluded Higgs mass ranges at 100–103 and 147–180 GeV.

=== Discovery of new boson ===
Feynman diagrams showing the cleanest channels associated with the Low-Mass, ~125GeV, Higgs Candidate observed by the CMS at the LHC. The dominant production mechanism at this mass involves two gluons from each proton fusing to a Top-quark Loop, which couples strongly to the Higgs Field to produce a Higgs Boson.

Left: Diphoton Channel: Boson subsequently decays into 2 gamma ray photons by virtual interaction with a W Boson Loop or Top-quark Loop. Right: 4-Lepton "Golden Channel" Boson emits 2 Z bosons, which each decay into 2 leptons (electrons, muons). Experimental Analysis of these channels reached a significance of 5 sigma. The analysis of additional vector boson fusion channels brought the CMS significance to 4.9 sigma.

On 22 June 2012 CERN announced an upcoming seminar covering tentative findings for 2012, and shortly afterwards rumours began to spread in the media that this would include a major announcement, but it was unclear whether this would be a stronger signal or a formal discovery. Speculation escalated to a "fevered" pitch when reports emerged that Peter Higgs, who proposed the particle, was to be attending the seminar.

On 4 July 2012 CMS announced the discovery of a previously unknown boson with mass 125.3 ± 0.6 GeV/c^{2} and ATLAS of a boson with mass 126.5 GeV/c^{2}. Using the combined analysis of two decay modes (known as 'channels'), both experiments reached a local significance of 5 sigma — or less than a 1 in one million chance of a statistical fluctuation being that strong. When additional channels were taken into account, the CMS significance was 4.9 sigma.

The two teams had been working independent from each other, meaning they did not discuss their results with each other, providing additional certainty that any common finding was genuine validation of a particle. This level of evidence, confirmed independently by two separate teams and experiments, meets the formal level of proof required to announce a confirmed discovery of a new particle. CERN has been cautious, and stated only that the new particle is "consistent with" the Higgs boson, but scientists have not positively identified it as being the Higgs boson, pending further data collection and analysis.

On July 31, the ATLAS collaboration presented further data analysis, including a third channel. They improved the significance to 5.9 sigma, and described it as an "observation of a new particle" with mass 126 ± 0.4 (stat.) ± 0.4 (sys) GeV/c^{2}. Also CMS improved the significance to 5 sigma with the boson's mass at 125.3 ± 0.4 (stat) ± 0.5 (sys) GeV/c^{2}.

On 14 March 2013 CERN confirmed that:

"CMS and ATLAS have compared a number of options for the spin-parity of this particle, and these all prefer no spin and even parity [two fundamental criteria of a Higgs boson consistent with the Standard Model]. This, coupled with the measured interactions of the new particle with other particles, strongly indicates that it is a Higgs boson."

== Events in 2012 ==
=== 2012 (post-discovery) ===
In 2012, observations were considered consistent with the observed particle being the Standard Model Higgs boson. The particle decays into at least some of the predicted channels. Moreover, the production rates and branching ratios for the observed channels match the predictions by the Standard Model within the experimental uncertainties. However, the experimental uncertainties still left room for alternative explanations. It was therefore considered too early to conclude that the found particle was indeed the Standard Model Higgs boson.

Further confirmation required more precise data on some of the characteristic of the new particle, including its other decay channels and various quantum numbers such as its parity. To allow for further data gathering, the LHC proton-proton collision run had been extended by seven weeks, postponing the planned long shutdown for upgrades in 2013.

In November 2012, in a conference in Tokyo researchers said evidence gathered since July was falling into line with the basic Standard Model more than its alternatives, with a range of results for several interactions matching that theory's predictions. Physicist Matt Strassler highlighted "considerable" evidence that the new particle is not a pseudoscalar negative parity particle (a required finding for a Higgs boson), "evaporation" or lack of increased significance for previous hints of non-Standard Model findings, expected Standard Model interactions with W and Z bosons, absence of "significant new implications" for or against supersymmetry, and in general no significant deviations to date from the results expected of a Standard Model Higgs boson. However some kinds of extensions to the Standard Model would also show very similar results; based on other particles that are still being understood long after their discovery, it could take many years to know for sure, and decades to understand the particle that has been found.

=== Premature media reports of confirmation as a Higgs boson ===
In late 2012, Time, Forbes, Slate, NPR, and others announced incorrectly that the existence of the Higgs boson had been confirmed. Numerous statements by the discoverers at CERN and other experts since July 2012 had reiterated that a particle was discovered but it was not yet confirmed to be a Higgs boson. It was only in March 2013 that it was announced officially. This was followed by the making of a documentary film about the hunt.

== Timeline of experimental evidence ==
All results refer to the Standard Model Higgs boson, unless otherwise stated.

- 2000–2004 – using data collected before 2000, in 2003–2004 Large Electron–Positron Collider experiments published papers which set a lower bound for the Higgs boson of 114.4 GeV/c^{2} at the 95% confidence level (CL), with a small number of events around 115 GeV.
- July 2010 – data from CDF (Fermilab) and DØ (Tevatron) experiments exclude the Higgs boson in the range 158–175 GeV/c^{2} at 95% CL.
- 24 April 2011 – media reports "rumors" of a find; these were debunked by May 2011. They had not been a hoax, but were based on unofficial, unreviewed results.
- 24 July 2011 – the LHC reported possible signs of the particle, the ATLAS Note concluding: "In the low mass range (c. 120–140 GeV) an excess of events with a significance of approximately 2.8 sigma above the background expectation is observed" and the BBC reporting that "interesting particle events at a mass of between 140 and 145 GeV" were found. These findings were repeated shortly thereafter by researchers at the Tevatron with a spokesman stating that: "There are some intriguing things going on around a mass of 140GeV." On 22 August 2011 it was reported that these anomalous results had become insignificant on the inclusion of more data from ATLAS and CMS and that the non-existence of the particle had been confirmed by LHC collisions to 95% certainty between 145 and 466 GeV (except for a few small islands around 250 GeV).
- 23–24 July 2011 – Preliminary LHC results exclude the ranges 155–190 GeV/c^{2} (ATLAS) and 149–206 GeV/c^{2} (CMS) at 95% CL.
- 27 July 2011 – preliminary CDF/DØ results extend the excluded range to 156–177 GeV/c^{2} at 95% CL.
- 18 November 2011 – a combined analysis of ATLAS and CMS data further narrowed the window for the allowed values of the Higgs boson mass to 114–141 GeV.
- 13 December 2011 – experimental results were announced from the ATLAS and CMS experiments, indicating that if the Higgs boson exists, its mass is limited to the range 116–130 GeV (ATLAS) or 115–127 GeV (CMS), with other masses excluded at 95% CL. Observed excesses of events at around 124 GeV (CMS) and 125–126 GeV (ATLAS) are consistent with the presence of a Higgs boson signal, but also consistent with fluctuations in the background. The global statistical significances of the excesses are 1.9 sigma (CMS) and 2.6 sigma (ATLAS) after correction for the look elsewhere effect.
- 22 December 2011 – the DØ collaboration also sets limits on Higgs boson masses within the Minimal Supersymmetric Standard Model (an extension of the Standard Model), with an upper limit for production ranging from 90 to 300 GeV, and excluding tanβ>20–30 for Higgs boson masses below 180 GeV at 95% CL.
- 7 February 2012 – updating the December results, the ATLAS and CMS experiments constrain the Standard Model Higgs boson, if it exists, to the range 116–131 GeV and 115–127 GeV, respectively, with the same statistical significance as before.
- 7 March 2012 – the DØ and CDF collaborations announced that they found excesses that might be interpreted as coming from a Higgs boson with a mass in the region of 115 to 135 GeV/c^{2} in the full sample of data from Tevatron. The significance of the excesses is quantified as 2.2 standard deviations, corresponding to a 1 in 250 probability of being due to a statistical fluctuation. This is a lower significance, but consistent with and independent of the ATLAS and CMS data at the LHC. This new result also extends the range of Higgs-mass values excluded by the Tevatron experiments at 95% CL, which becomes 147-179 GeV/c^{2}.
- 2 July 2012 – the ATLAS collaboration further analysed their 2011 data, excluding Higgs mass ranges of 111.4 GeV to 116.6 GeV, 119.4 GeV to 122.1 GeV, and 129.2 GeV to 541 GeV. Higgs bosons are probably located at 126 GeV with significance of 2.9 sigma. On the same day, the DØ and CDF collaborations also announced further analysis, increasing their confidence that the data between 115 and 140 GeV is corresponding to a Higgs boson to 2.9 sigma, excluding mass ranges at 100–103 and 147–180 GeV.
- 4 July 2012 – the CMS collaboration announced the discovery of a boson with mass 125.3 ± 0.6 GeV/c^{2} within 4.9 σ (sigma) (up to 5 sigma depending on the analysed channel), and the ATLAS collaboration a boson with mass of ~126.5 GeV/c^{2}.
- 31 July 2012 – the ATLAS collaboration further improved their analysis and announced the discovery of a boson with mass 126 ± 0.4 (stat.) ± 0.4 (sys) GeV/c^{2}. Also CMS improved the significance to 5 sigma with the boson's mass at 125.3 ± 0.4 (stat) ± 0.5 (sys) GeV/c^{2}.

== Statistical analysis ==
In 2012, the "5-sigma" criterion required by the scientists at the LHC, and its underlying frequentist interpretation of probability, triggered the interest of some statisticians, especially Bayesians: "five standard deviations, assuming normality, means a p-value of around 0.0000005 [...] Are the particle physics community completely wedded to frequentist analysis?". However, the research at LHC being already too advanced, the discussion didn't seem to have led to a Bayesian re-analysis of the data.
