= Barbara Sellers-Young =

Barbara Sellers-Young is the former Dean of the School of Arts, Media, Performance, and Design of York University. She has applied the somatic marker hypothesis to dance performance in numerous articles and lectures, and is the author or editor of seven books on dance theory including The Oxford Handbook of Dance and Ethnicity and Belly Dance. Her investigation on the intersectionality of dance and culture within a multicultural world has included research in numerous countries. She is on the editorial board for the Dance Chronicle, and is a member of the advisory council for the School of Music and Dance at the University of Oregon.

== Notable works ==
- The Oxford Handbook of Dance and Ethnicity and Belly Dance, Oxford University Press (co-editor) 2016, ISBN 978-0199754281
- Belly Dance, Pilgrimage and Identity, Palgrave Macmillan 2016, ISBN 978-1349949533
- Sellers-Young, B.; Shay, A. (Summer 2007). "Belly Dance: Orientalism, Transnationalism, And Harem Fantasy". Dance Research Journal. 39 (1): 104–106. JSTOR 20444690.
