= Chicago in the 1930s =

History of American city

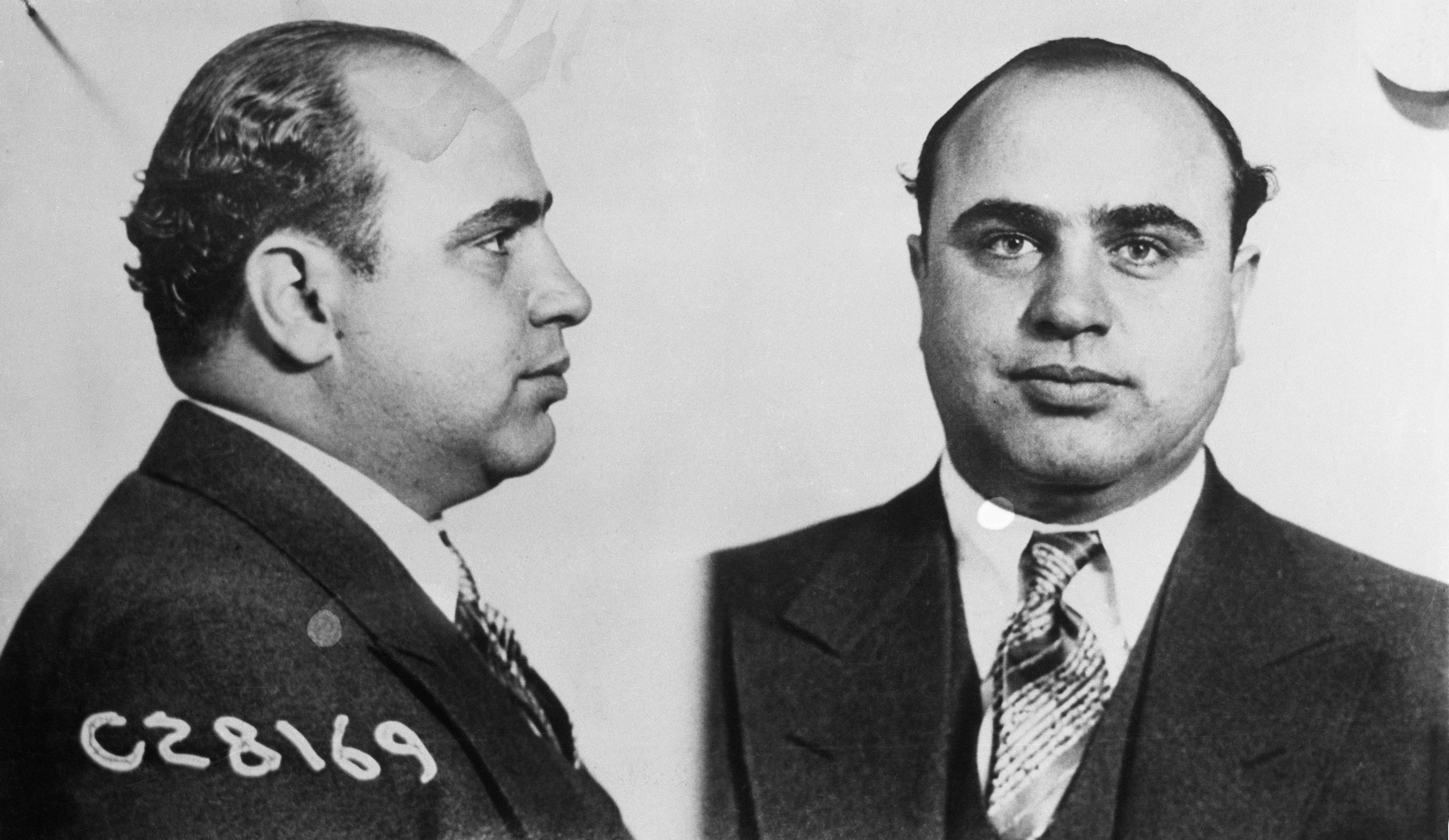
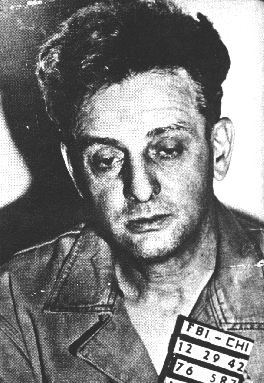
Chicago gangsters of the 1930s. Left and center: Al Capone. Right: Roger Touhy

Chicago in the 1930s was one of the major centers of activity in the United States. 1930s Chicago is strongly associated with gangsters and the mafia and speakeasies to provide alcohol following Prohibition. In a dark and gloomy time during the Great Depression, many people in the city were unemployed and became dependent on food hand-outs in order to get by; many turned to crime as a way to deal with poverty. Many struggling musicians came to the city and found solace in the blues and jazz in the clubs of the city as a way to cope with their grievances. Numerous southern blues and jazz musicians made a name for themselves in the city as they had done in the 1920s. The theater scene in Chicago thrived during this period.

== 1930-1931 ==
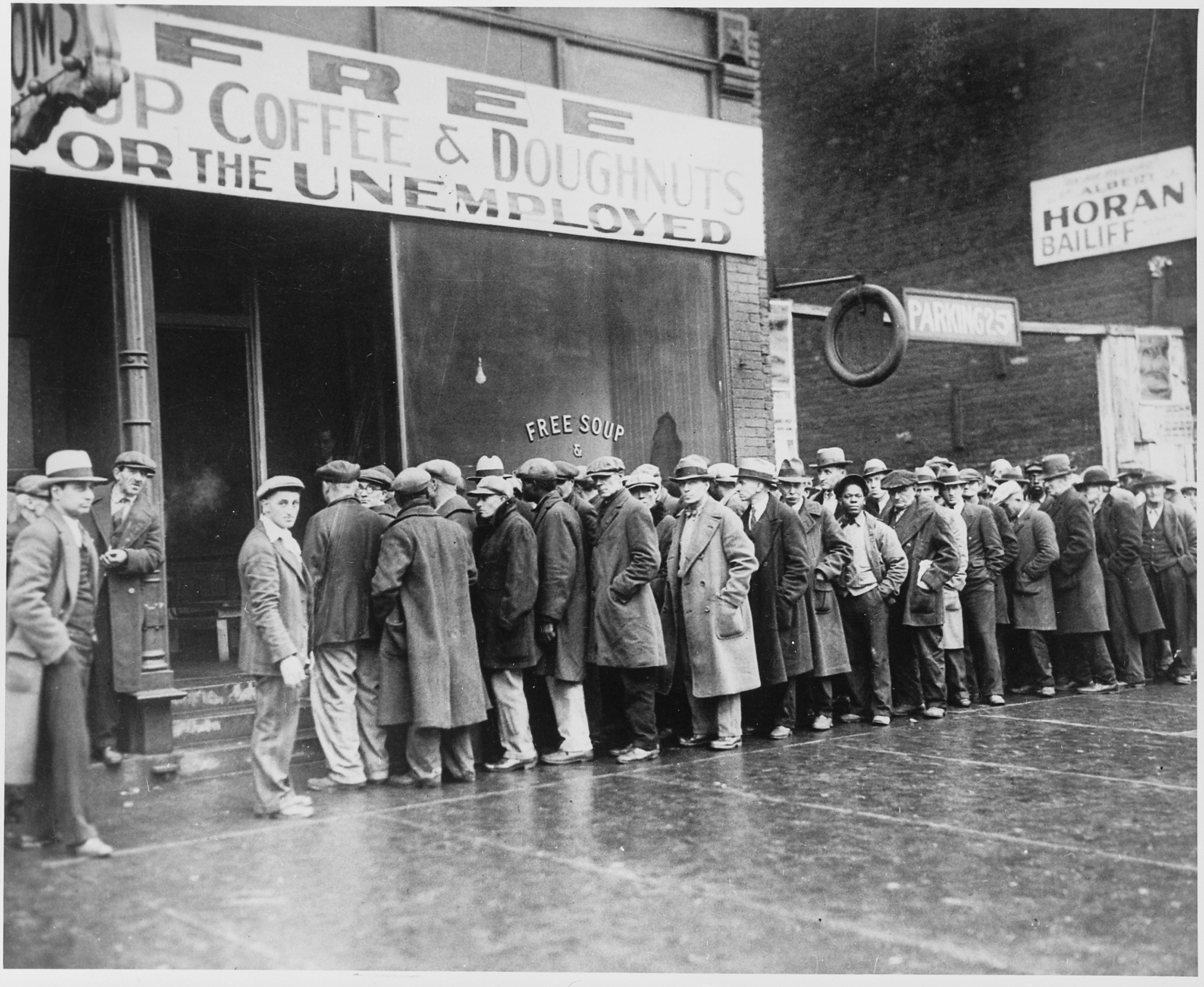
Unemployed men queued outside a depression soup kitchen opened in Chicago by Al Capone, 1931

During the early days of the Great Depression, musicians from the southern region migrated to the north to Chicago and the Chicago blues absorbed them into their fold, allowing their ensembles to become very popular. The originality of each musician was brought to the fore in these ensembles.

In 1930, President Herbert Hoover's work on behalf of Chicago's "Al Capone problem" began to "get legs." A Washington, D.C. special prosecutor Dwight H. Green was appointed to Chicago to capture the Chicago gangsters and send them to jail, particularly Al Capone. Green had access to all the government ammunition needed for the job. However, Capone was aware of the secret plans of the Federal government with men identified to execute the job by men like Frank J. Wilson, a U.S. Secret Service agent, and Elmer Irey, the IRS head. Capone had sounded and fixed the people who mattered by sending a legal team to the nation's capitol for executing the deal. Yet, while the money was taken, it bought Capone no influence in Washington, D.C.

This did not stop the IRS investigations and even his Capone underlings Frank Nitti (Francesco Nitto) were booked by the IRS and sentenced to 18 months in prison and a $10,000 fine. Capone's brother Ralph (Raffaele Capone, Sr.), was also indicted for three years in Leavenworth Federal Penitentiary and a $10,000 fine. On 17 October 1931, Al Capone was convicted of tax evasion following a four-day trial in Chicago. Bribes failed to help him. However, Capone had "cut a deal" with the prosecutors during the pre-trial to drop 5,000 "Prohibition" violations that could have "nailed him" for 25,000-years-to-life if convicted on all the charges. It has been said that Capone underling Gus Winkler was prevented by other Capone men from freeing him outright, with $100,000 upfront (a tax payment, not a bribe) to the federal taxman.

On 24 October 1931, one week after he was convicted of tax evasion, Al Capone was sentenced to 11 years in federal prison (first, Atlanta Federal Penitentiary, then Alcatraz Island), fined $50,000 and charged $30,000 in court costs. While awaiting transfer to Atlanta to serve his sentence, Capone sat in Cook County Jail, where it was reported that he "had all the booze and women he wanted".

Some time during 1931, a group of mostly college graduates in the Chicago area, called the "College Kidnappers," embarked on the bold step of kidnapping low-level, area gangsters and held them for ransom. Allegedly, the Klutas gang, named after leader Theodore "Handsome Jack" Klutas, took in a half-million dollars from these kidnappings in about a two-year span.

The Merchandise Mart was completed for Marshall Field & Co. in 1930. The $32 million, 4.2 million square foot (390,000 m^{2}) building was the world's largest commercial building. It was sold it to Joseph P. Kennedy in 1945. The Adler Planetarium opened on 10 May 1930, through a gift from local merchant Max Adler. It was the first planetarium in the Western Hemisphere. Adler was quoted as saying, "Chicago has been striving to create, and in large measure has succeeded in creating, facilities for its citizens of today to live a life." The Shedd Aquarium opened soon afterwards in May 1930. In 1931, and again the following year, the city hosted the International Workers' Olympics.

At the beginning of 1930 and at beginning of 1940, the population of Chicago was 3,376,438 and 3,396,808 respectively.

The Doorway to Hell (1930) was a movie made in 1930 based on the theme of organizing the various gangs in Chicago so that the gangsters do not destroy each other. It was nominated for the Best Writing, Original Story for Rowland Brown, in 1931.

== 1932–1933 ==
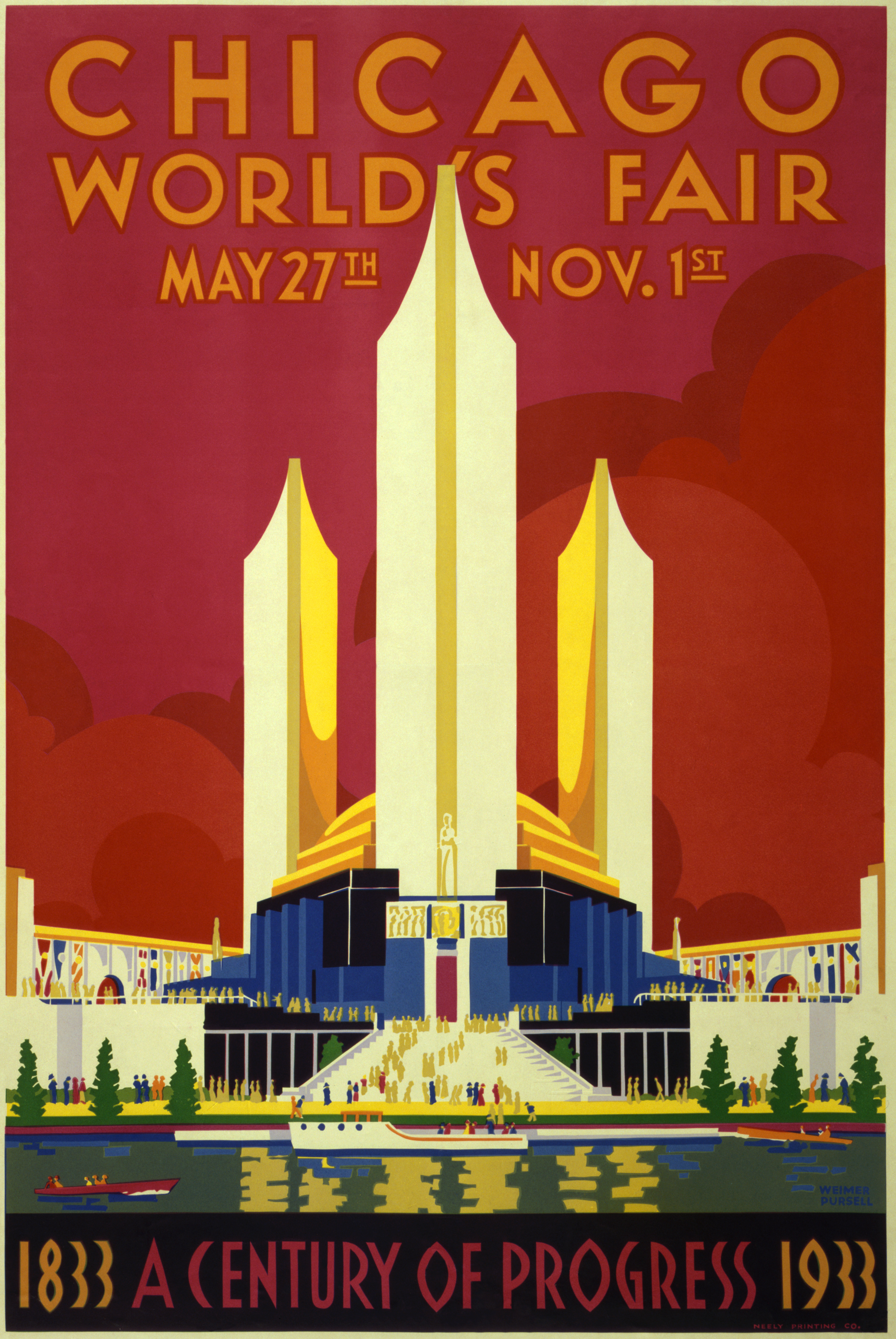
Century of Progress World's Fair, 1933 poster

In 1932, the Chicago democrats got into power and Franklin Roosevelt achieved 98% votes from the Twenty Fourth ward. Eddy Kelly was elected mayor and the Chicago democrats, who ruled so overwhelmingly that they held office for nearly 70 years, until the end of the 1900s. They played a key role in the elections of Harry Truman and John F Kennedy. By 1932, Chicago as a city was about 100 years old since it was established by Jean Baptiste Du Sable, and had grown to a population of 3.4 million.

In 1932, the Chicago school system was also in tatters and the banking industry went into a tailspin as many of the banks who had invested in the electric company "The Common Wealth Edison" busted during the Great Depression as the stock market crashed.

In May 1932, Al Capone began serving his 11-year sentence for tax evasion, in Atlanta, GA. He was later transferred to Alcatraz Island to finish his sentence.

The Gangster Era came to an end in 1933. It had lasted since 1919 when Prohibition began. The 1920s saw gangsters, including Al Capone, Dion O'Banion, Bugs Moran and Tony Accardo battle law enforcement and each other on the streets of Chicago during the Prohibition era.

The Century of Progress World's Fair took place in 1933 from May 27 to November 1 and named "A Century of Progress". On February 15, 1933, Mayor Anton Cermak was shot while standing near President-elect Roosevelt in Miami; the mayor died on March 6. In December 1933, violence broke out by communists in the city. On December 17 they attacked a parade of Ukrainians. By 1933, four years after the start of the Great Depression, unemployment reached 50 percent.

In early 1933, after one of his gang turned on him, Theodore "Handsome Jack" Klutas was machine-gunned to death by cops. Thus, ending the gang's kidnapping spree.

In 1929, Robert Maynard Hutchins was the fifth president of the University of Chicago when the university underwent many changes during his 24-year tenure. He had eliminated varsity football from the university in an attempt to emphasize academics over athletics. He organized the university's graduate work into its current four divisions and a liberal-arts curriculum known as the Common Core was also added. In 1933, his proposal to merge the University of Chicago and Northwestern University into a single university did not come through During his tenure in office, the development of University of Chicago Hospitals, now known as the University of Chicago Medical Center, was completed and enrolled its first medical students, and also at the same time the Committee on Social Thought was created.

== 1934–1935 ==
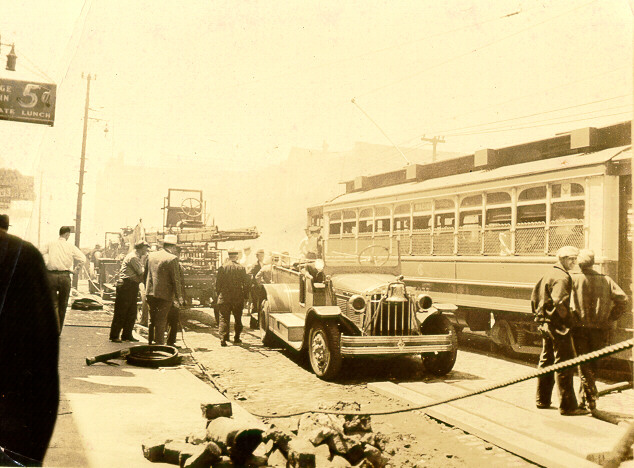
The aftermath of the 1934 Chicago Union Stock Yards' fire

On 22 July 1934, John Dillinger was shot by the FBI in the alley next to the Biograph Theater. On January 19, 1935, Coopers Inc. sold the world's first briefs. In 1935, Jay Berwanger of the University of Chicago was awarded the very first Heisman Trophy. In 1934, a major fire broke out at the Chicago Union Stock Yards, the second major fire in its history after the 1910 fire.

Masses of blacks migrated to the city from the south during the Great Migration of the first half of the 20th century. Many arrived in the city looking for work and settled in what became known as the "Black Belt", the chain of neighborhoods on the South Side of Chicago where three-quarters of the city's African American population lived by the mid-20th century. The Black Belt was an area of aging, dilapidated housing that stretched 30 blocks along State Street on the South Side. It was rarely more than seven blocks wide.

Many African Americans who moved to the Black Belt area of Chicago were from the Southeastern region of the United States. Discrimination played a big role in the lives of blacks. They often struggled to find decent housing. Immigration to Chicago resulted in overcrowding, and although there were decent homes in the African American sections, the core of the Black Belt was a slum. A 1934 census estimated that black households contained 6.8 people on average, whereas white households contained 4.7.

Many Blacks lived in apartments that lacked plumbing, with only one bathroom for each floor. With the buildings so overcrowded, building inspections and garbage collection were below the minimum mandatory requirements for healthy sanitation. This unhealthiness increased the threat of disease. Crime in African-American neighborhoods was a low priority to the police. Associated with problems of poverty and southern culture, rates of violence and homicide were high. Some women resorted to prostitution to survive. Both low life and middle class strivers were concentrated in a small area.

== 1936–1937 ==
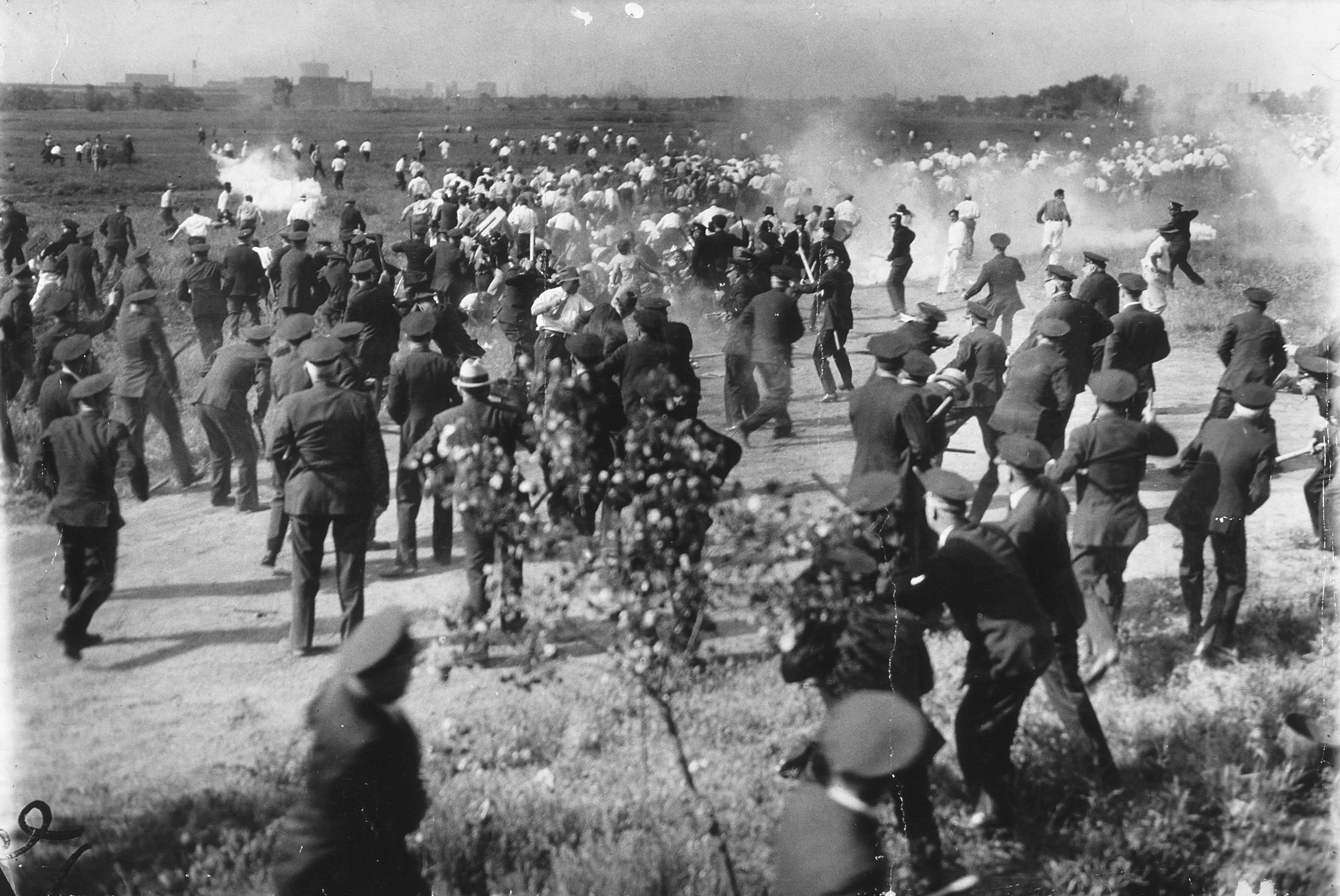
The Chicago Memorial Day Incident, 1937

Soldier Field was the scene of the 1936 world championship games when Chicago hosted the Amateur Softball Association. Although billiards was considered to be a popular commercial sport for blue-collar workers, the number of licensed billiard parlors diminished from 2,244 (1920) to 580 (1936) due to the Great Depression. On November 27, 1937, in Soldier Field, Austin High School beat Leo High School 26–0 in the annual Chicago Prep Bowl which pitted the champions of the city's Public League against the Catholic League. The crowd, estimated at 120,000, was considered to be the largest ever to view a football game in the United States.

On May 26, 1937, 85,000 steelworkers in five states walked out, beginning the "Little Steel strike". Five Chicago-area mills were shut with 22,000 workers going on strike. A clash began with Republic Steel strikebreakers four days later. Ten demonstrators were killed by police bullets during the strike. When several smaller steelmakers, including Republic Steel, refused to follow the lead of U.S. Steel by signing a union contract, a strike was called by the Steel Workers Organizing Committee (SWOC) of the Congress of Industrial Organizations (CIO). In the melee that followed, 10 demonstrators were killed and 60 injured; 40 police officers were hurt.

== 1938–1939 ==
The year 1938 saw the National League pennant won by the Cubs. A key moment in the team's pennant drive came near the end of the season when Gabby Hartnett hit a game-ending home run at a foggy and nearly dark Wrigley Field; according to legend, the ball disappeared into the fog and was never found. The Cubs went into first place, and clinched the pennant three days later. Hartnett's shot entered baseball lore as the "Homer in the Gloamin'".

On 8 November 1939, two unknown gunman assassinated Chicago's Attorney Edward O'Hare. They drove close to his car on Ogden Avenue and shot him. Apparently, O'Hare had double crossed The Outfit (secretive organized crime cartel) while managing some of its affairs had leaked information about the Outfit to authorities for years.

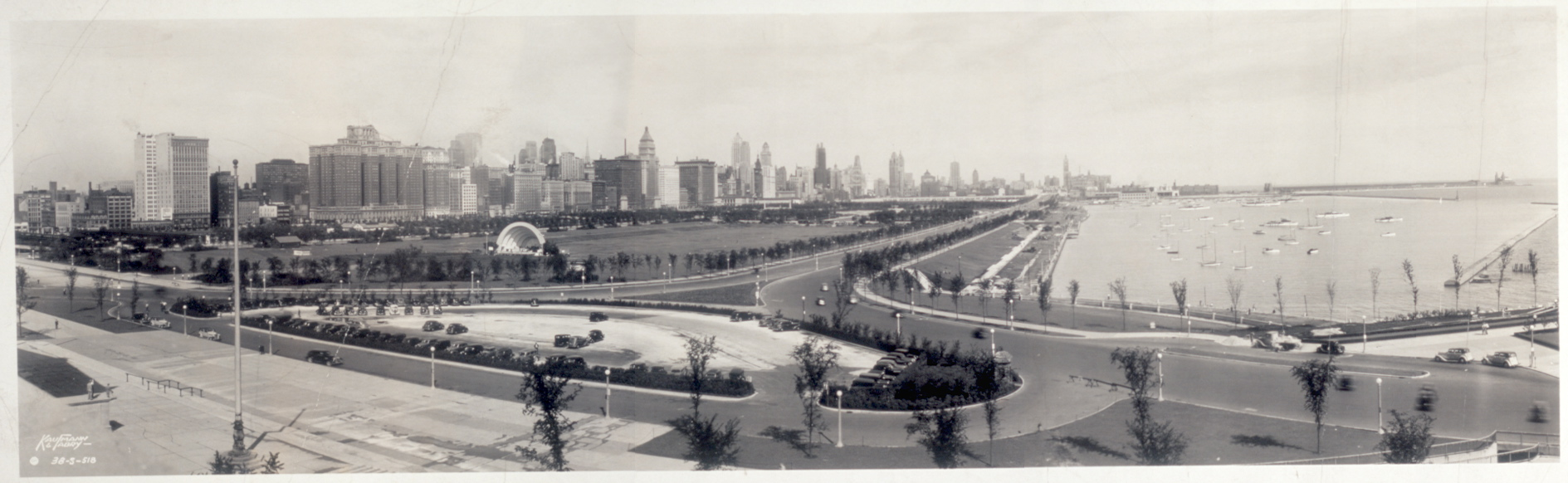
Lakefront of Chicago, 1938

After long efforts, in the late 1930s, workers organized across racial lines to form the United Packinghouse Workers of America. By then, the majority of workers in Chicago's plants were black, but they succeeded in creating an interracial organizing committee. It succeeded in organizing unions both in Chicago and Omaha, Nebraska, the city with the second largest meatpacking industry. This union belonged to the Congress of Industrial Organizations (CIO), which was more progressive than the American Federation of Labor. They succeeded in lifting segregation of job positions. For a time, workers achieved living wages and other benefits, leading to blue collar middle-class life for decades. Some blacks were also able to move up the ranks to supervisory and management positions. The CIO also succeeded in organizing Chicago's steel industry. Raceway Park was a one-fifth-mile asphalt oval, built in 1938, for amateur stock car competitions.

== Social history ==
The Great Depression, starting in 1929, hammered Chicago families hard. Prices fell--but so did wages. Savings were used up and local stores were in deep trouble when their customers could not pay. Bankruptcy hit the huge network of electric utilities run by Samuel Insull, hurting 600,000 stockholders and 500,000 bondholders. However, the great majority of large businesses survived by cutting back operations. Small businesses often closed. Urban unemployment soared to 25%. Corporate hiring offices typically turned away inexperienced young people, and rarely hired anyone over the age of 50. In Chicago ethnic commnities opened 199 small neighborhood banks in the booming 1920s. They specialized in financing mortgages for their community. As income dropped rents went unpaid, mortgages were foreclosed; the resale value of homes plunged. By 1933, only 33 of the 199 survived. Frustrated depositors eventually received about 80 cents on their dollar. Local charity operations were soon overwhelmed, including the Catholic Charities, Jewish Charities, Salvation Army, United Charities, and the Chicago Chapter of the American Red Cross. Chicago's city government was virtually insolvent even before the stock market crash of late 1929 due to a fiscal crisis and a widespread tax strike. Psychologically, people coped and doubled up or tripled up. Teenagers stayed in school longer, which paid off in the long run. Older boys from impoverished families took to the road so their siblings would have more to eat. Illinois families suffered and survived and promised themselves never again.

== In popular culture ==
The third volume of The Adventures of Tintin, the comics series by Belgian cartoonist Hergé, Tintin in America took place in Chicago in the early 1930s.

== Bibliography ==
- Ciccone, F. Richard (9 September 2009). Royko: A Life in Print. PublicAffairs. pp. 24–. ISBN 978-0-7867-5197-6.
- Jones, Gene Delon. " The Local Political Significance of New Deal Relief Legislation in Chicago: 1933–1940." (PhD dissertation, Northwestern University; ProQuest Dissertations & Theses, 1970. 7101882
- Russo, Gus (2 December 2008). The Outfit. Bloomsbury Publishing. ISBN 978-1-59691-897-9.
- Sifakis, Carl (1 January 2005). The Mafia Encyclopedia. Infobase Publishing. ISBN 978-0-8160-6989-7.
