= Paramount News =

Newsreel series

Paramount News is a newsreel series that was produced by Paramount Pictures from 1927 to 1957.

== History ==
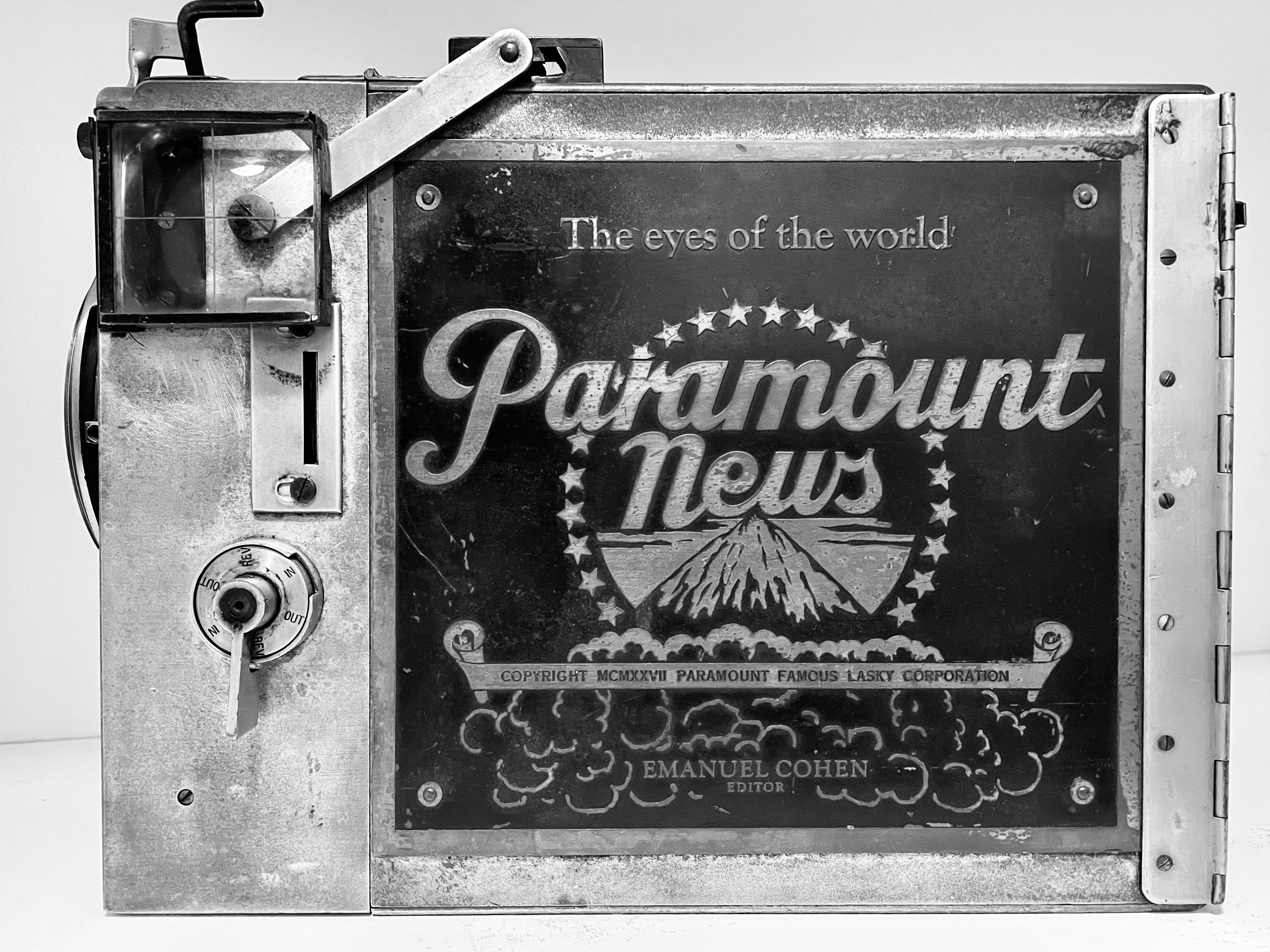
Le Parvo Series K Paramount News Camera, one of two known survived cine apparatuses.

The Paramount newsreel operation began in 1927 with Emanuel Cohen as an editor. It typically distributed two issues per week to theaters across the country until its closing in 1957. In the early days, Paramount News footage was silent and filmed with Debrie Parvo cameras branded with the unique Paramount logo and slogan "The Eyes of the World". It is estimated that about 15 of those cameras were bought by Paramount, but only a few survive today; one can be seen at Paramount Studios.

Paramount newsreels typically ran from seven to nine minutes, with the average story running from 40 to 90 seconds. At first, when the newsreels were silent, narration was presented via title cards. By 1930, sound had been introduced and voiceover talent (see below) had been hired to provide the narration.

When the news warranted, the entire issue was devoted to one major story, such as the bombing of Pearl Harbor (1941), the historic inauguration of Franklin D. Roosevelt's third term as President (1941), the presentation of a Mid-Century Sports Poll (1950) in which sports figures such as Jim Thorpe, Babe Ruth, Jesse Owens, Jack Dempsey, and Babe Didrikson (among others) were highlighted, or a recap of the All-American college football team of the previous year.

A typical issue began with a "hard" news item and wound its way down to "softer" news items as it progressed, usually ending with a recap of recent sports events.

Paramount cameramen shot some rare exclusive footage, putting Paramount News near the forefront of the competition with other newsreel operations such as Pathé News (1910-1956), Fox Movietone News (1928-1963), Hearst Metrotone News (1914-1967), Universal Newsreel (1929-1967), and The March of Time (1935-1951).

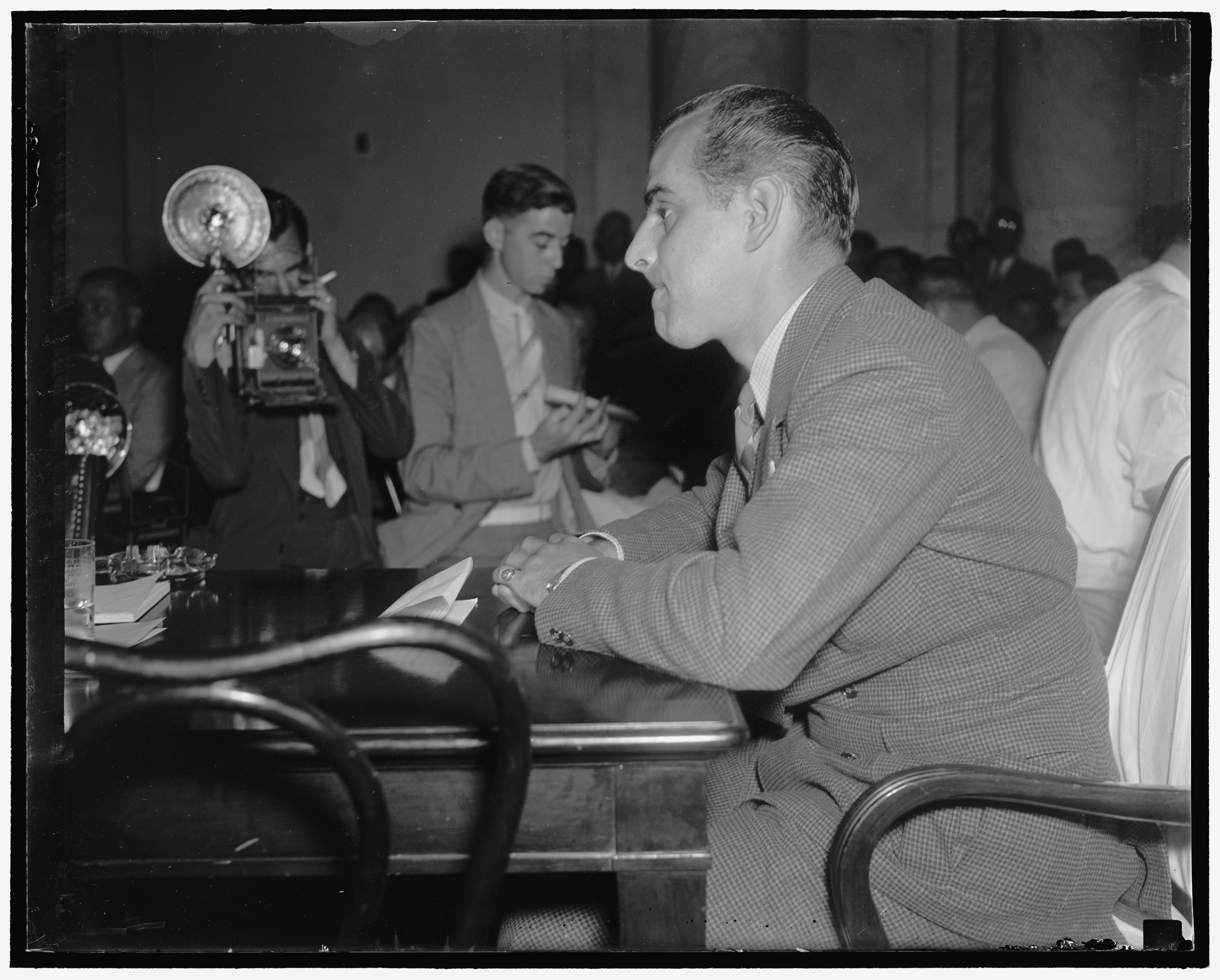
Cameraman for Paramount News testifies about the 1937 Memorial Day massacre before the U.S. Senate Civil Liberties Committee in Washington, D.C. (July 2, 1937)

One Paramount News exclusive was the 1937 Republic Steel strike in Chicago. On Memorial Day, May 26, 1937, the strike escalated into a massacre, documented by the 1937 film Republic Steel Strike Riot Newsreel Footage. Highlights of Paramount News include basketball player Wilt Chamberlain being introduced to the sports world at the age of seventeen, playing high school basketball, and countless special coverage pieces about Paramount movie premieres and stars, including Bob Hope, Bing Crosby, Martin and Lewis, Jerry Lewis solo, and Frank Sinatra at New York's Paramount Theater in 1944 with throngs of bobby soxers swooning. However, footage of W. C. Fields on a Paramount set filming International House when the 1933 Long Beach earthquake struck was later revealed to have been faked by that film's crew for publicity purposes.

Paramount mogul Adolph Zukor "presented" (produced) Paramount News and appeared in many of its newsreels throughout the years. The Paramount News slogan was "The Eyes and Ears of the World" ("The Eyes of the World" in its early silent days) and was included in its well-known closing, which featured a cameraman turning a large 35 mm movie camera toward the audience. This was accompanied by a music theme titled "Paramount on Parade", which later became the audio logo for Paramount Pictures, composed by Elsie Janis.

== Voiceover talent ==
Voiceover talent included Gregory Abbott (1900–1981), lead voice for the presentation of news and the only narrator to stay until the series ended in 1957. Bill Slater was a narrator for many years. Other narrators included Gabriel Heatter (who introduced the voiceover talent in a special issue release of Paramount News in the early 1930s, Gregory Abbott being among those introduced), Vincent Connoly, Maurice Joyce, Dennis James (later a TV game show and variety show host), Gilbert Martyn, and Frank Gallop among others.

The sports segments were narrated by Bill Slater in the early years and from 1948 to the end of the Paramount News run in 1957 by ex-athlete and football player Marty Glickman, who later became known as the voice of New York sports and was renowned in sports broadcasting. Other broadcasters such as Johnny Most, Don Dunphy and Jackson Beck lent a hand doing sports voiceovers for a few Paramount News releases; Beck also did a few "hard news" stories as well. Gregory Abbott, Gilbert Martyn, and Maurice Joyce also handled some sports stories.

== Current status and ownership rights ==
Producer Sherman Grinberg, through his company Sherman Grinberg Film Libraries (founded in 1958, who also acquired the 50% interest in the American Pathé News library), acquired the rights to the Paramount News library in the early 1960s, and Sherman Grinberg currently owns the rights to the library, with stock footage represented by Getty Images.

== Awards ==
Paramount News Issue #37 (1946) was nominated for an Academy Award for Best Documentary Short.
