= Women's day massacre =

1937 incident in Youngstown, Ohio, US

- Date: June 19, 1937
- Location: Youngstown, Ohio
- Caused by: Police treatment of steelworkers' wives
- Methods: Protesting, striking, rioting
- Result: Union organizers are fired and blacklisted, steelworkers for the involved companies remain without union recognition until 1941

Parties
Steel Workers Organizing Committee	Republic Steel; Youngstown police department Ohio National Guard

Casualties
- Deaths: 2
- Injuries: 23

The women's day massacre was a violent strikebreaking crackdown that took place on June 19, 1937, in Youngstown, Ohio during the Little Steel strike and resulted in the killing of two people and injuries to 23 others.

== Background ==
Members of the Steel Workers Organizing Committee (SWOC) were protesting Little Steel Management to receive recognition for their union organization. In March 1937, U.S. Steel had agreed to recognize the union, but the smaller Republic Steel refused to follow suit. Republic's anti-union chairman, Thomas Girdler, defied labor laws and used force to intimidate workers, firing over a thousand union supporters. These actions led to workers striking at steel mills across several states in the Little Steel strike and to an intense class battle. The strike went beyond picketing when steelworkers' wives joined the demonstration alongside their husbands in an event deemed "Women's Day".

== Incident ==
Charley Richmond, a Youngstown police captain placed in charge of watching the picket line, was unhappy to see women protesting and decided to find a union leader to immediately put an end to their demonstration. When he could not find a leader to halt the protest, he gathered a small contingent of police to demand the women leave, as he believed they had no business being there. His misogynist views angered the women, who responded to his attitude by spitting and cursing towards the officers. When they refused to leave, the police captain ordered tear gas fired on the women and their children, who were also present at the demonstration. An infant being carried by one of the women was injured during the assault. Outraged, union workers began to rush on the scene. They attacked a policeman who had been isolated from the other officers, which resulted in gunfire from the police. The battle that took place directly in front of Republic Steel's front gate did not deter the union workers – they regrouped, and the confrontation with the police morphed into an all-out battle. The encounter continued through the night, with local SWOC leaders doing everything they could to protect union workers and restore order. They realized their attempt at separating the warring groups was in vain when they witnessed one of the union supporters, John Bogovich, die after being shot in the neck. When news of Bogovich's death spread to the people of Youngstown, melee ensued. Union supporters returned fire on the police, a scene described by witnesses as "The Great War [starting] over again". By dawn, Ohio's governor had called in over 5,000 National Guard members to protect Youngstown. SWOC organizer John Steuben was forced to negotiate a peaceful withdrawal of police forces while the remaining union supporters gathered for a debriefing of the night's events.

== Aftermath ==
In the end, Republic fired many of the union leaders, and steel workers were forced to continue their fight for dignity in the labor force. The U.S. Senate's La Follette Civil Liberties Commission investigated the overall "Little Steel" strike in Chicago (where 10 people had died) and six in various locations in Ohio. The Committee found that over the course of the strike, 16 people had died and 283 people were injured between May 30 and July 11. The number included the two persons killed and 23 injured in Youngstown on June 19 and 20., and that some of those were shot in the back while running away from the police. It was determined that the police forces were internally hired by Republic Steel and were supplied with over 160,000 rounds of ammunition for the Youngstown district. One union organizer looked back on the scene, describing it as "Gas...flying all over the place and shots flying and flares going up and it was the first time I had ever seen anything like it in my life". It wasn't until 1941 that the Little Steel companies finally recognized unions.

== See also ==
- Little Steel strike
- List of worker deaths in United States labor disputes
