= Jesse Reese =

Black trade unionist and communist

Jesse Reese, was a black communist and militant trade unionist in the United States.

== Early life and career ==
After being forced to work in a chain gang, Reese fled from Mississippi to Gary, Indiana in the 1920s. He likely joined the Communist Party shortly after arriving. He lived with Walter Mackerl during the Great Depression. The two of them knew each other from the Universal Negro Improvement Association and Reese was described as "a diehard" by Mackerl.

He got a job at Youngstown Sheet and Tube, which was one of the "little steel" companies, in Indiana Harbor in 1929. According to Reese, a Communist Party organizer came to his home to ask him to become active in the Amalgamated Association as his assignment. When he was warned that he would be confronted with Jim crow type racism, Reese replied "Well, I have a few other things on my mind. Freedom, Tom Mooney, the Scottsboro boys–nine young Negro boys framed for rape in Scottsboro, Alabama."

Reese was one of the few openly black Communists and served as a spokesman for the party. Reese served as the president of the Youngstown Lake Front Lodge of the Amalgamated Association of Iron, Steel and Tin workers, before he became the first vice president of the newly formed Steel Workers Organizing Committee (SWOC) Local 1011 in 1938.

In the 1930s Reese was named as one of the "six most active" union organizers for the Steel Workers Organizing Committee. In the summer of 1936, SWOC and National Negro Congress held meetings 3 days a week, twice a day, corresponding with the shifts of the workers. George Kimbley, the first black steel worker to join SWOC in Gary, Indiana recounts how he was recruited:

Jesse Reese was a Communist, and he let the world know it. He didn't hide it. Anybody asked him was he a Communist, and he would tell you with pride that he was a Communist. But, we, he was a likeable sort of a fellow. On Saturday afternoons, many of us would go to his house and play cards. And on that one Saturday afternoon in... Jesse Reese had been to a meeting in East Chicago, and he got home. I was sitting in the house. He said, "Hey, Brother Kimbley, join the union, I've a card here". He handed it to me, and I kept talking after I got up and looked at it and signed my name and just handed him a dollar. Just like that, easy. And lo and behold when I found out, [laughs] I think I wrote the, I was the first steel worker to join the union in Gary, Indiana.

— Interview with George Kimbley

== See also ==
- Little Steel strike
- Communist Party USA and African Americans
