= Bob Pronger =

American racing driver

- Born: Robert Pronger; January 22, 1922; Blue Island, Illinois, US
- Died: June 17, 1971 (aged 49)
- Achievements: 1961 & 1969 Raceway Park Late Model Track Champion

NASCAR Cup Series career
- 9 races run over 7 years
- Best finish: 84th (1959)
- First race: 1951 Southern 500 (Darlington)
- Last race: 1961 Daytona 500 Qualifier #1 (Daytona)
Wins	Top tens	Poles
0	0	0

NASCAR Convertible Division career
- 14 races run over 3 years
- Best finish: 29th (1956)
- First race: 1956 Race No. 1 (Daytona Beach and Road Course)
- Last race: 1958 Race No. 1 (Daytona Beach and Road Course)
Wins	Top tens	Poles
0	2	0
- Statistics up to date as of April 19, 2023.

Robert Pronger (January 22, 1922 – June 17, 1971) was an American stock car owner, driver and Chicago Outfit associate from Blue Island, Illinois. He competed in nine NASCAR Cup Series and 14 NASCAR Convertible Division events in his career.

== Background ==
Born and raised in Blue Island, Illinois, Pronger would first become exposed to automobile racing through the city's local short track at the time, Raceway Park, in 1948. Pronger began entering stock car races at the track the following year.

== Racing career ==
Starting in 1949, Pronger began his racing career at Raceway Park, where he would amass 148 race wins and two track championships from 1949 to 1971. His success on the local scene allowed him the opportunity to race on the national level, and would make his first NASCAR Cup Series appearance in the 1951 Southern 500. Notably, Pronger competed in the inaugural 1959 Daytona 500 as one of his few starts in the division. In addition to the Cup Series, Pronger also raced in the NASCAR Convertible Division for three years, achieving two top-five finishes across 14 race starts. Outside of NASCAR, Pronger also competed in the Midwest Association for Race Cars, a precursor to ARCA, and in the USAC Stock Car Series.

== Criminal career ==
In concurrence with his racing career, Pronger also conducted an extensive criminal career alongside his brother, John Pronger. He was convicted twice on federal charges relating to stealing cars in Chicago that would then be resold across state lines in Indiana, first coming to the attention of the Chicago Police Department when arrested for attempting to steal the car of local singer Art Kassel. He would also become involved in automobile chop shop schemes with the Chicago Outfit in the Chicagoland and Northwest Indiana regions, which would net Pronger earnings of $125,000 a year.

== Disappearance and death ==
On June 17, 1971, Pronger was last seen alive eating breakfast at the Rainbow Restaurant in Calumet Park, driving a black Cadillac. He was reported missing by his family shortly after, on June 22. Weeks after, a body, believed to be Pronger's, was found under a mattress near Griffith, Indiana. This came after Pronger had reported to police that someone had attempted to murder him in his apartment the previous month, and that shots had been fired at him on his way to Raceway Park on two separate occasions. A government informant later reported to a United States Senate subcommittee that he was murdered at the hands of William Dauber and Steve Ostrowsky.
