= Republic Steel Strike Riot Newsreel Footage =

1937 newsreel

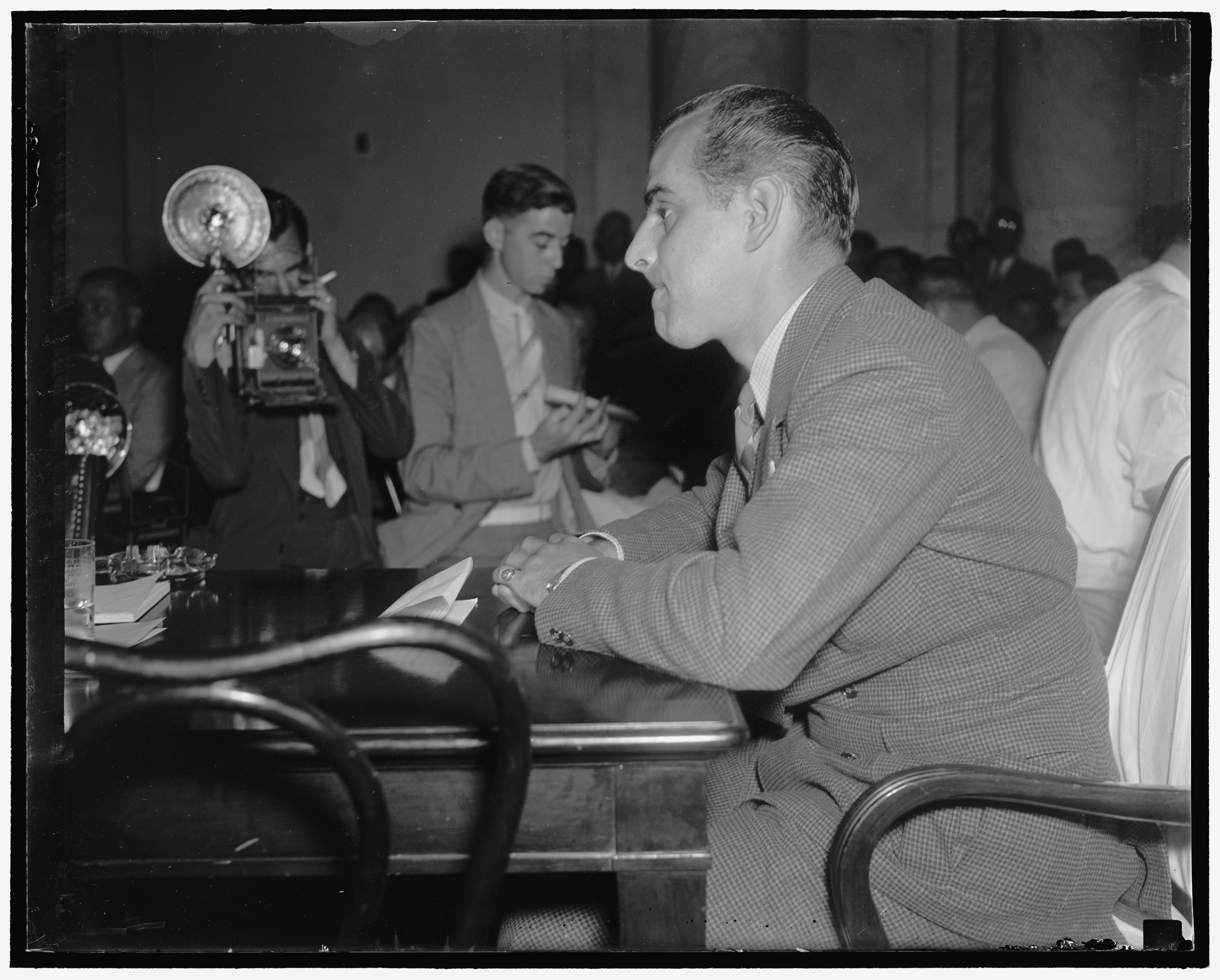
Orlando Lippert, cameraman for Paramount News, testifies about the 1937 Memorial Day massacre before the La Follette Civil Liberties Committee of the U.S. Senate (July 2, 1937)

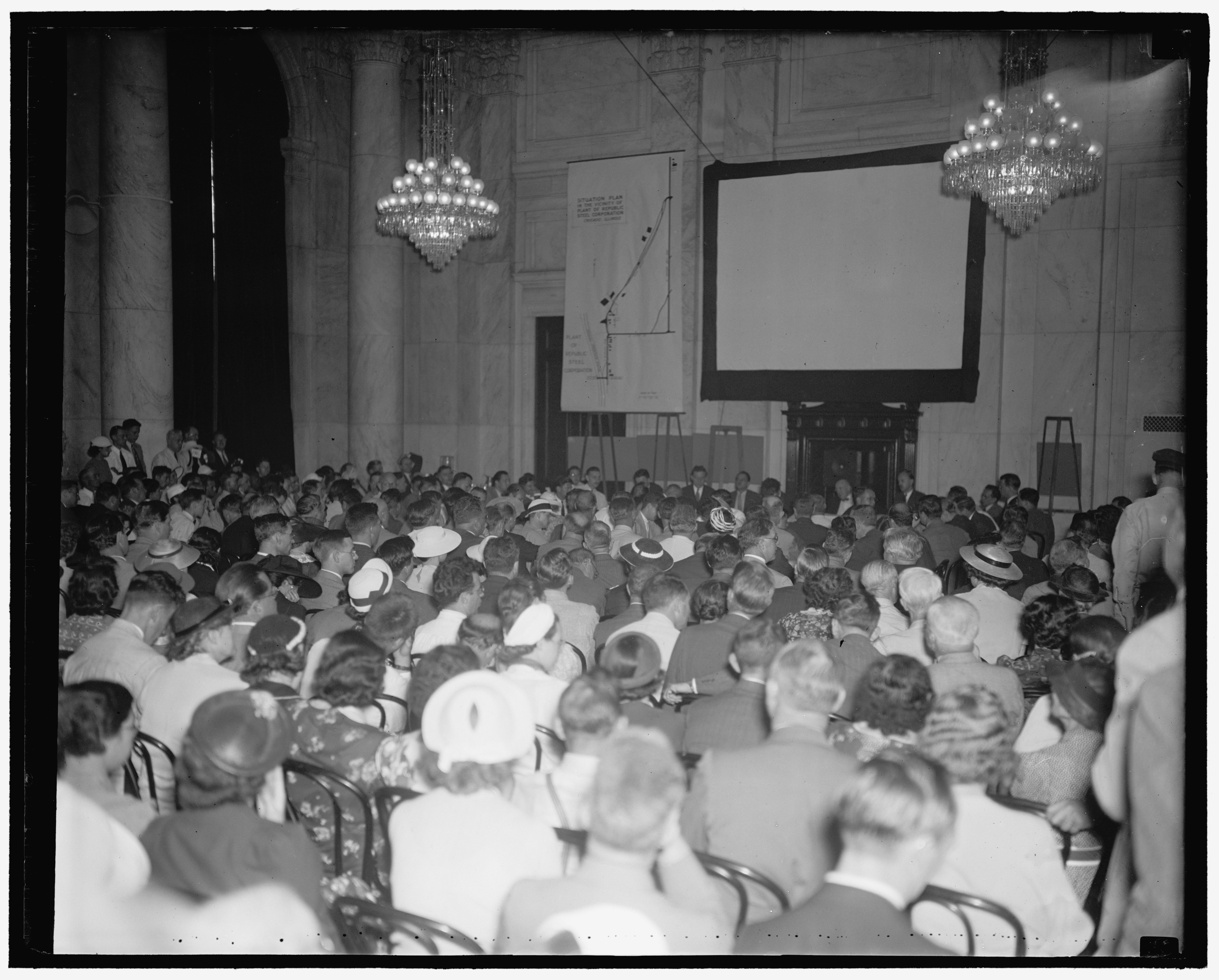
Screening of Paramount News footage of the 1937 Memorial Day massacre before the La Follette Civil Liberties Committee (July 2, 1937)

Republic Steel Strike Riot Newsreel Footage is a 1937 newsreel of the strike at Republic Steel on Memorial Day, May 30, 1937, which escalated into a massacre when Chicago police fired on protestors (1937 Memorial Day massacre). Ten protesters were killed by the police and thirty others suffered gunshot wounds. The police also used clubs and tear gas on the protesters. The film was produced by Paramount Pictures for their Paramount News series. In 1997, the film was deemed "culturally significant" by the United States Library of Congress and selected for preservation in the National Film Registry. The footage contained in the newsreel was illegally banned from being shown in Chicago by the Chicago Police Department for fear of causing unrest, and later the Paramount News company agreed to refrain from screening it elsewhere. The editor of Paramount News described the footage as "not fit to be seen," and that allowing the public to view it in its entirety could "incite local riot." However, clips from the footage were edited and released as a newsreel that framed the strikers as a violent mob.

== See also ==
- Memorial Day massacre of 1937
