= 1937 Memorial Day massacre =

1937 police shooting in Chicago, Illinois, US

Memorial Day massacre of 1937
- Part of Little Steel strike
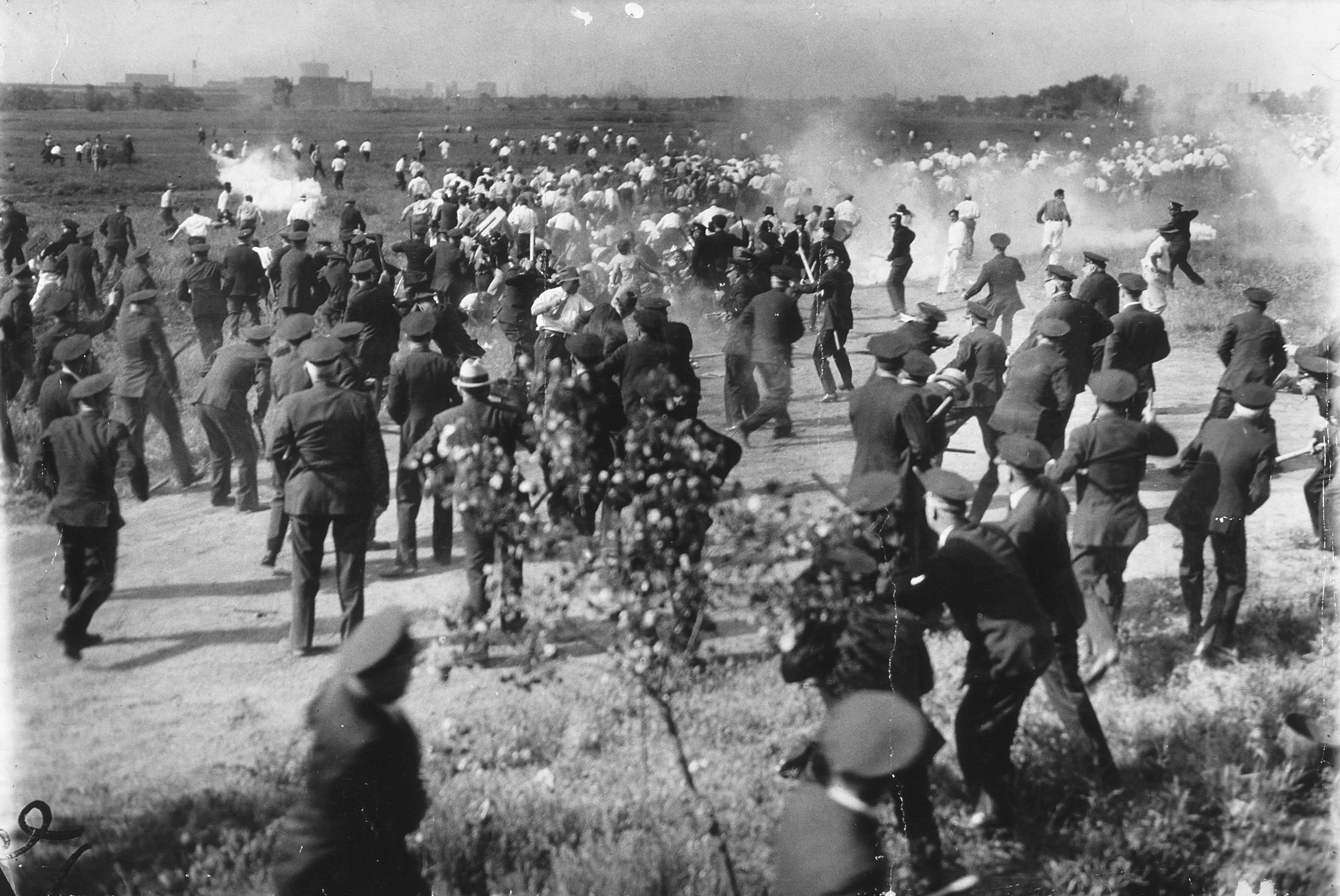
- The Chicago Memorial Day Incident, photograph from the papers of the La Follette Committee
- Date: May 30, 1937
- Location: Chicago, Illinois, United States; 41°40′58″N 87°32′24″W

Parties
Steel Workers Organizing Committee	Chicago Police Department

Lead figures
Dorothy Day	

Casualties and losses
Deaths: 10; Wounded: 67+	Deaths: 0
- Location within Greater Chicago

In the Memorial Day massacre of 1937, the Chicago Police Department shot and killed ten unarmed demonstrators in Chicago, on May 30, 1937. The incident took place during the Little Steel strike in the United States.

== Background ==
The incident arose after U.S. Steel signed a union contract but smaller steel manufacturers (called 'Little Steel'), including Republic Steel, refused to do so. In protest, the Steel Workers Organizing Committee (SWOC) of the Congress of Industrial Organizations (CIO) called a strike.

== Incident ==
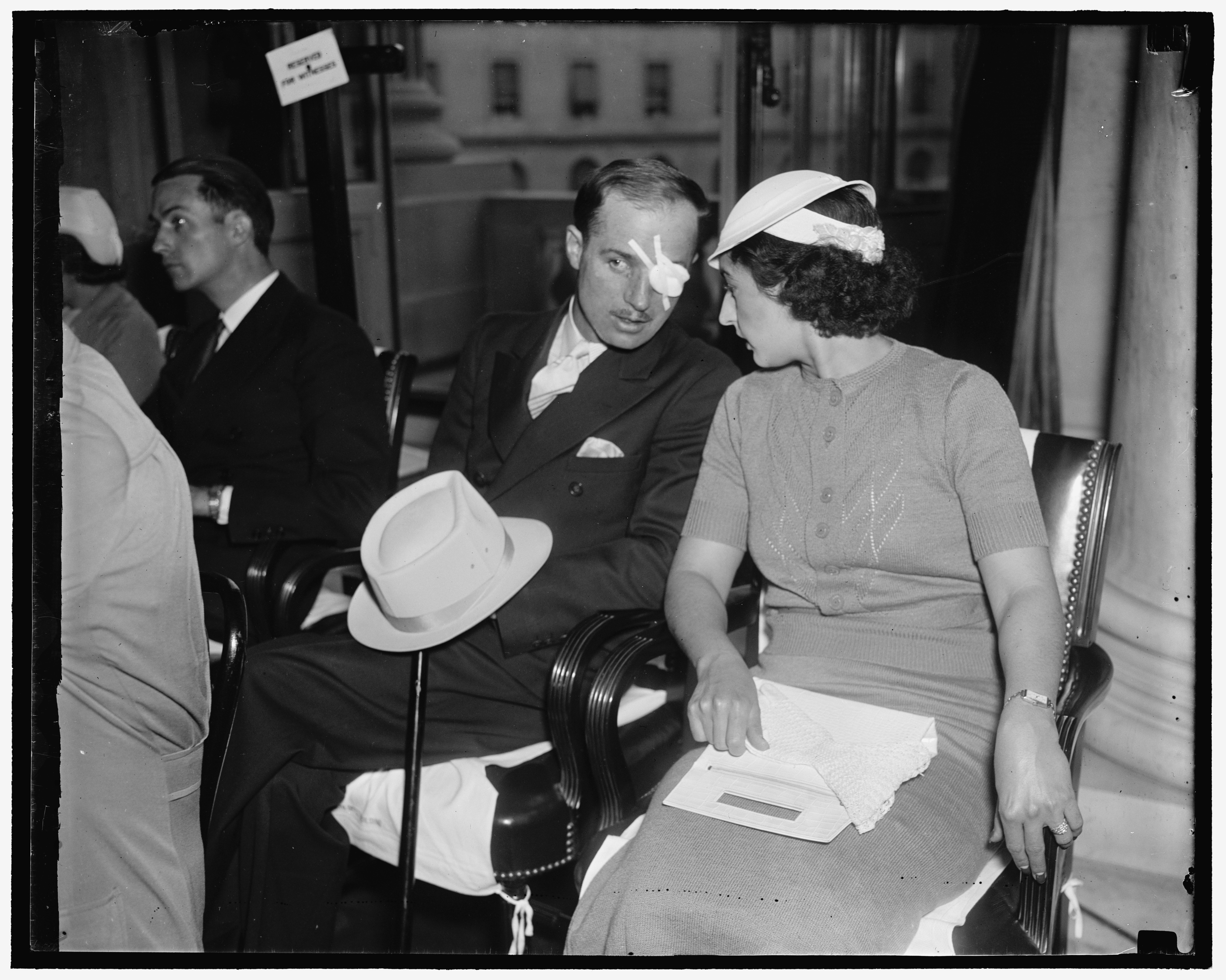
A victim of the incident waits to testify before the La Follette Civil Liberties Committee of the U.S. Senate (June 30, 1937)

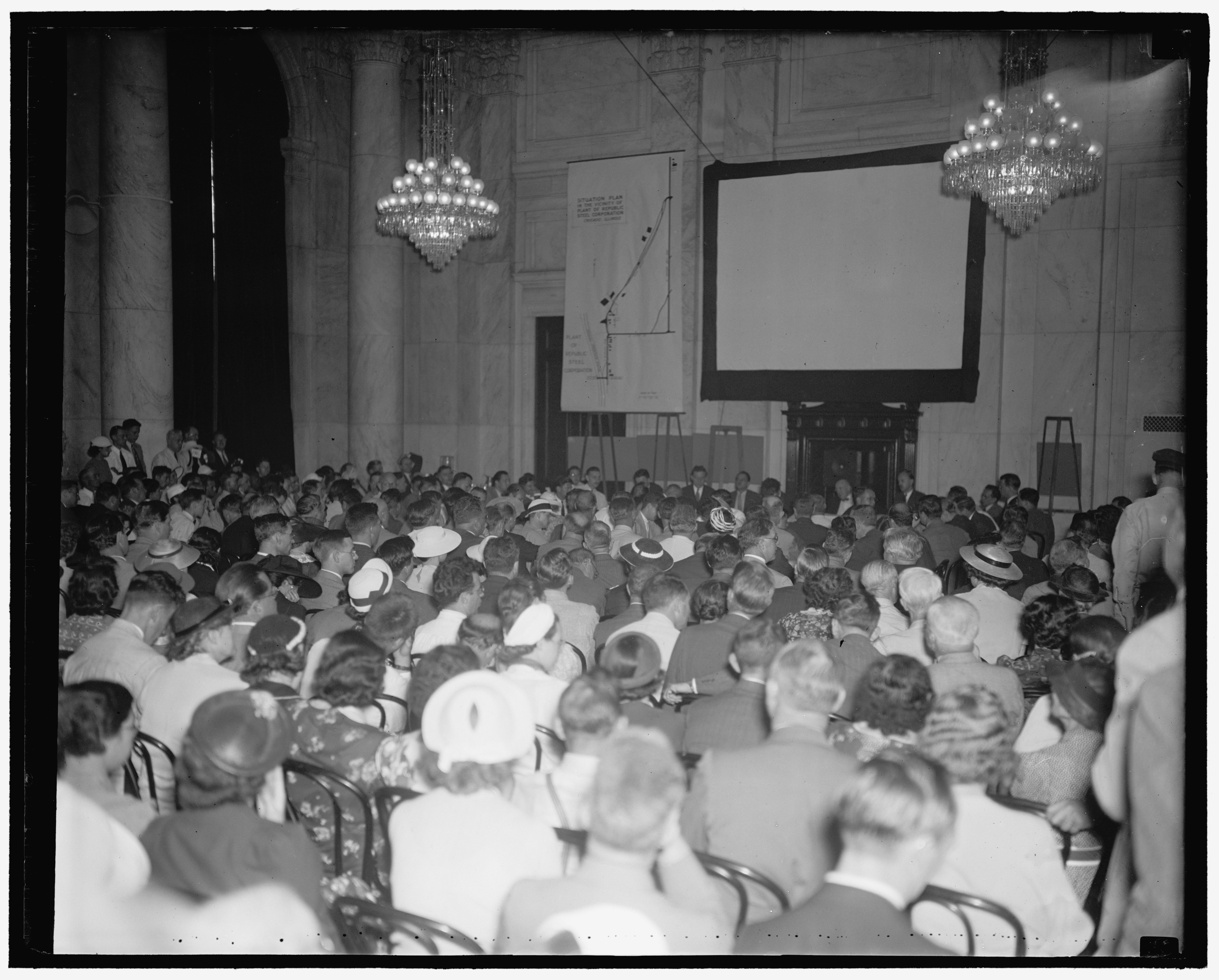
Paramount News footage of the 1937 Memorial Day massacre screens before the La Follette Committee (July 2, 1937)

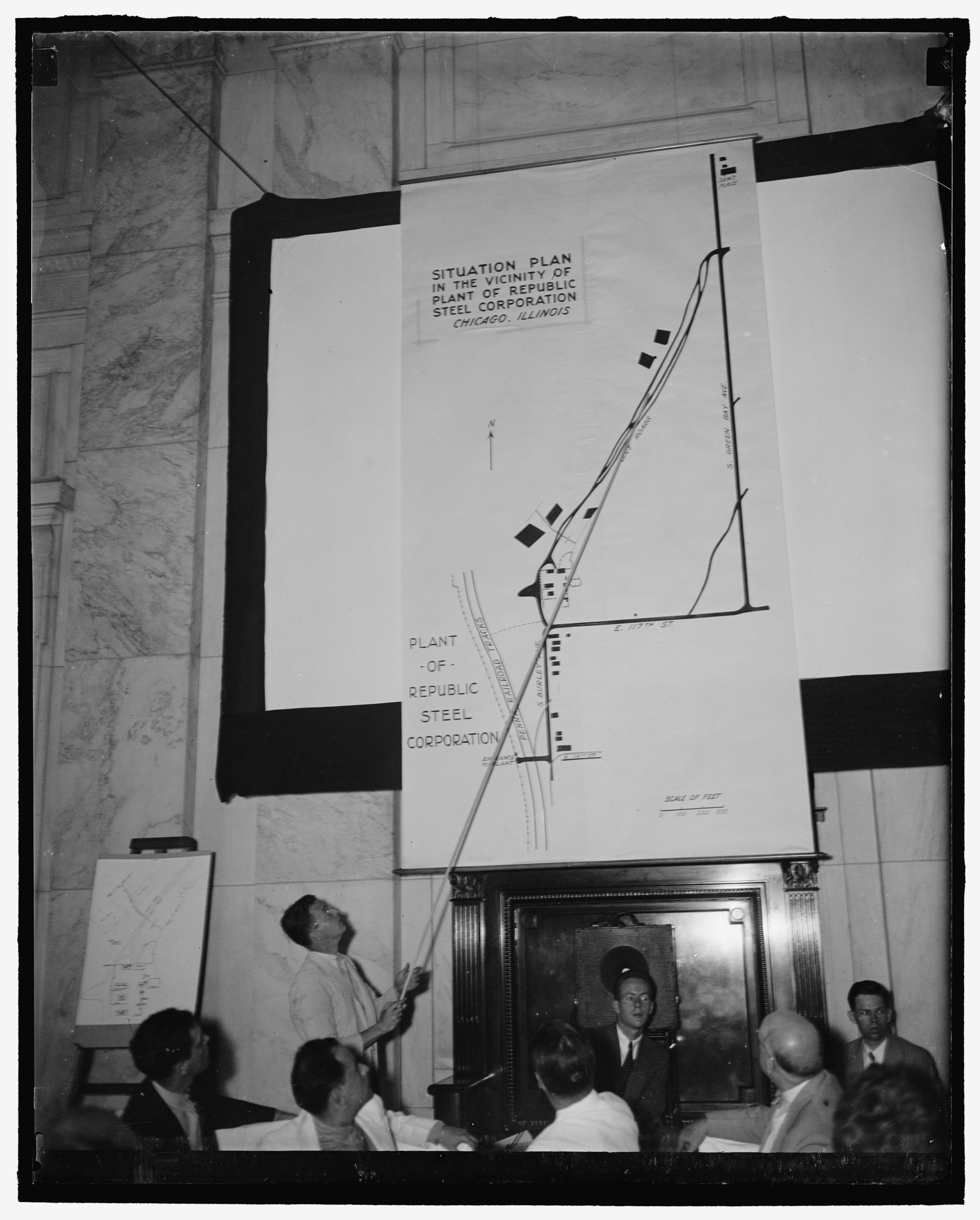
Chicago police defend their riot tactics at a hearing before the La Follette Committee (June 30, 1937)

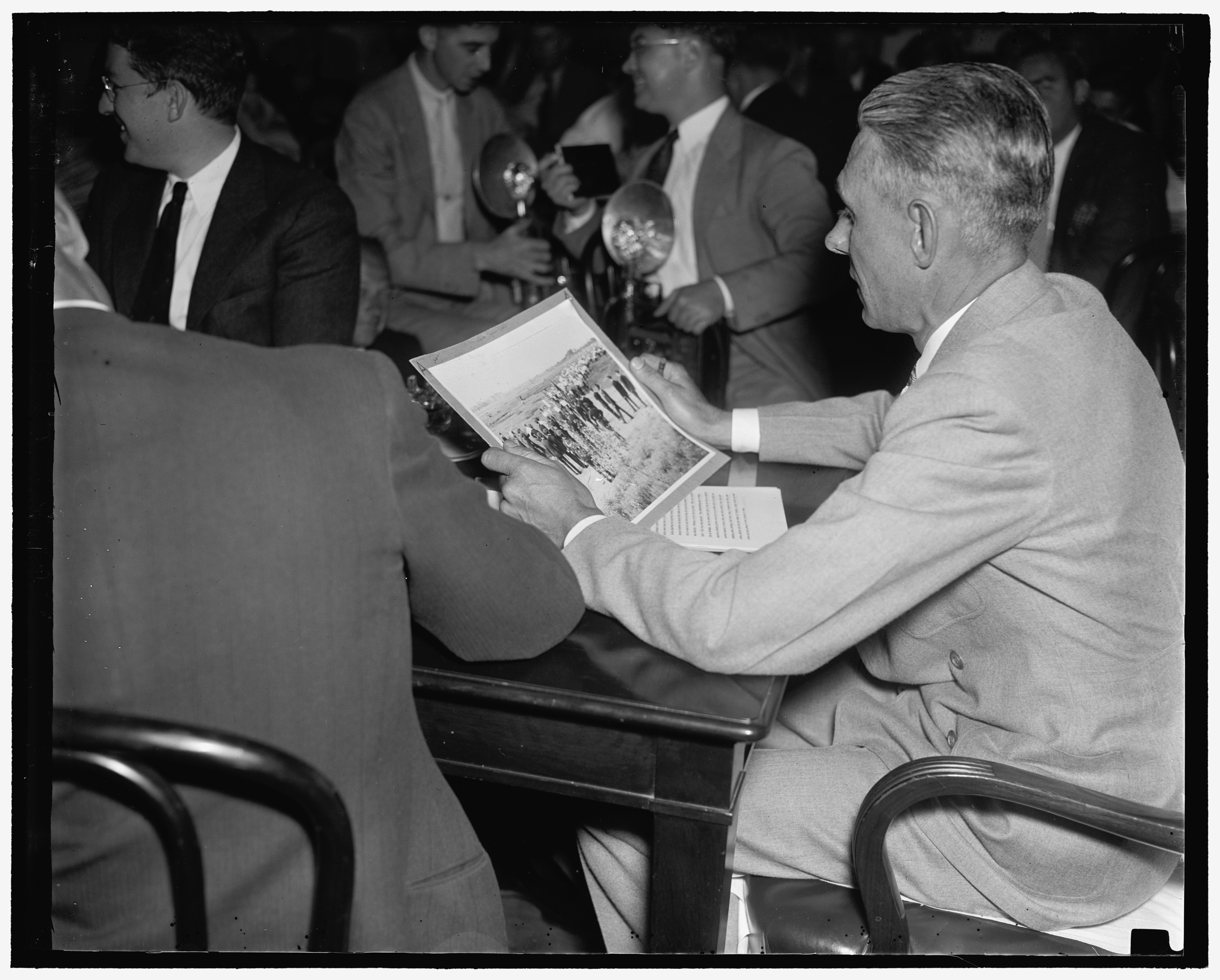
A Chicago police sergeant clashes with chairman Robert M. La Follette Jr. during testimony before the Senate Civil Liberties Committee (July 1, 1937)

On Memorial Day 1937, unionists, their families and sympathisers gathered at Sam's Place, a former tavern and dance hall at 113th Street and Green Bay Avenue, that served as the headquarters of the SWOC. There was an outdoor picnic lunch, speakers, and songs, and some estimate the crowd was between 1,500 and 2,500 including picketers and their families, strike sympathizers, and curious passersby. The crowd began to march across the prairie towards the Republic Steel mill to picket, but a line of roughly 300 Chicago policemen blocked their path. The foremost protestors argued their right to continue. The police fired on the crowd. As the crowd fled, police shot and killed ten people, four dying that day and six others subsequently from their injuries. Nine people were permanently disabled and another 28 had serious head injuries from police clubbing.

Dorothy Day, who was present, wrote: "On Memorial Day, May 30, 1937, police opened fire on a parade of striking steel workers and their families at the gate of the Republic Steel Company, in South Chicago. Fifty people were shot, of whom 10 later died; 100 others were beaten with clubs."

=== Fatalities ===
Ten union demonstrators were killed:

- Hilding Anderson, 27, Burnham, Illinois (USW Local 65) (died as a result of his injuries June 3, 1937)
- Alfred Causey, 43, Chicago, Illinois (USW Local 1010)
- Leo Francisco, 17, Chicago, Illinois (Western Union) (died as a result of his injuries June 15, 1937)
- Earl Handley, 37, East Chicago, Indiana (USW Local 1010)
- Otis Jones, 33, Lincoln, Illinois (USW Local 1033) (died as a result of his injuries June 8, 1937)
- Sam Popovich, 45, East Chicago, Indiana (USW Local 1010)
- Kenneth Reed, 23, East Chicago, Indiana (USW Local 1010)
- Joseph Rothmund, 48, Chicago, Illinois (WPA) (died as a result of his injuries May 31, 1937)
- Anthony Tagliori, 26, Chicago, Illinois (USW Local 1033) (died as a result of his injuries June 1, 1937)
- Lee Tisdale, 50, Chicago, Illinois (USW Local 1011) (died as a result of his injuries on June 19, 1937)

== Media coverage ==
In the wake of the massacre, newsreel footage of the event was suppressed for fear of creating, in the words of an official at Paramount News agency, "mass hysteria." Initial news coverage of the event instead framed the crowd as a violent threat to social order, arguing that police merely acted in self-defense. Still photographs were published in major newspapers such as the Chicago Tribune along with captions such as: "At the Height of the Battle--Here are policemen using their nightsticks and tear gas to subdue the attackers." Paramount did release edited clips from the newsreel footage of the massacre that portray the crowd as threatening and riotous.

== Legacy ==
Years later, one of the protesters, Mollie West, recalled a policeman yelling to her that day, "Get off the field or I'll put a bullet in your back." No policemen were ever prosecuted.

A Coroner's Jury declared the killings to be "justifiable homicide." The press often called it a labor or red riot. President Franklin Roosevelt responded to a union plea, "The majority of people are saying just one thing, ‘A plague on both your houses.’"

A memorial plaque at the base of a flagpole with the names of the 10 people who were killed is located at 11731 South Avenue O, the former United Steel Workers Local 1033 union hall, which is now occupied by the United Auto Workers Local 3212. Thirty years to the day of the massacre, it was dedicated on May 30, 1967. As of November of 2021, the flagpole base with plaque is still at the Avenue O location, but the flagpole is missing.

The Republic Steel Memorial Day Massacre Sculpture, created by former Republic Steel employee Edward Blazak, was dedicated in 1981. Originally located near the main gate at 116th Street and Burley Avenue, it was rededicated in 2008 and relocated to 11659 South Avenue O, at the southwest corner of the grounds of a Chicago Fire Department station housing Engine #104.

== See also ==
- Republic Steel Strike Riot Newsreel Footage (1937 documentary film)
- Chicago in the 1930s
- Murder of workers in labor disputes in the United States
- List of incidents of civil unrest in the United States
- List of homicides in Illinois

== Bibliography ==
- Auerbach, Jerold S. Labor and Liberty: The La Follette Committee and the New Deal. Indianapolis: Bobbs-Merrill Co., 1966.
- Baughman, James L. "Classes and Company Towns: Legends of the 1937 Little Steel Strike." Ohio History. 87:2 (Spring 1978).
- Bernstein, Irving. The Turbulent Years: A History of the American Worker, 1933-1941. Paperback edition. Boston: Houghton-Mifflin Co., 1970. ISBN 0-395-11778-X (Originally published 1969.)
- Blake, Benjamin. "Ohio's Steel Mill War The Little Steel Strike of 1937." Crooked River. December 2001.
- Brooks, Robert R. As Steel Goes... Unionism in a Basic Industry. New Haven: Yale University Press, 1940.
- Dennis, Michael J., "Chicago and the Little Steel Strike," Labor History 53 (Spring 2012): 167–204.
- Dennis, Michael J. The Memorial Day Massacre and The Movement for Industrial Democracy. New York: Palgrave MacMillan, 2010.
- Quirke, Carol. "Reframing Chicago's Memorial Day Massacre, May 30, 1937." American Quarterly 60.1 (2008): 129–157. online
- Sofchalk, Donald G. "The Chicago Memorial Day Massacre: An Episode of Mass Action." Labor History. Winter 1965.
- Speer, Michael. "The 'Little Steel' Strike: Conflict for Control." Ohio History. Autumn 1969.
- Stolberg, Benjamin. "Big Steel, Little Steel, and C.I.O." The Nation. July 31, 1937.
- White, Ahmed. The Last Great Strike: Little Steel, the CIO, and the Struggle for Labor Rights in New Deal America. University of California Press, 2016, pp. 130–146. online

=== Primary sources ===
- Mitchell, Greg. MEMORIAL DAY MASSACRE: Workers Die, Film Buried (2023) A Companion to the 2023 PBS Film) excerpt
- Pursuant to S. Res. 266 (74th Congress). A Resolution to Investigate Violations of the Right of Free Speech and Assembly and Interference with the Right of Labor to Organize and Bargain Collectively. Part 14: The Chicago Memorial Day Incident. Hearings Before a Subcommittee of the Committee on Education and Labor. United States Senate. Seventy-Fifth Congress, First Session. June 30, July 1 and 2, 1937. Washington, D.C.: United States Government Printing Office, 1937.
