= Republic Steel =

Steel manufacturing company

Republic Iron and Steel Company
- Type: Subsidiary
- Industry: Steel
- Founded: 1899; 127 years ago in Youngstown, Ohio, U.S.
- Headquarters: Canton, Ohio, U.S.
- Parent: Grupo Simec
- Website: republicsteel.com

Republic Steel is an American steel manufacturer headquartered in Canton, Ohio. It is a wholly owned subsidiary of Grupo Simec, a Mexican steel company based in Guadalajara. Republic Steel maintains production facilities in both Canton and Lackawanna, New York, which have been indefinitely idled as of 2023.

Republic Steel was founded as the Republic Iron and Steel Company in Youngstown, Ohio, in 1899. After rising to prominence during the 20th century, it was once the third-largest steel producer in the United States. Republic suffered heavy economic losses in the late 20th century and was eventually bought out before re-emerging in the early 2000s as a subsidiary.

== History ==
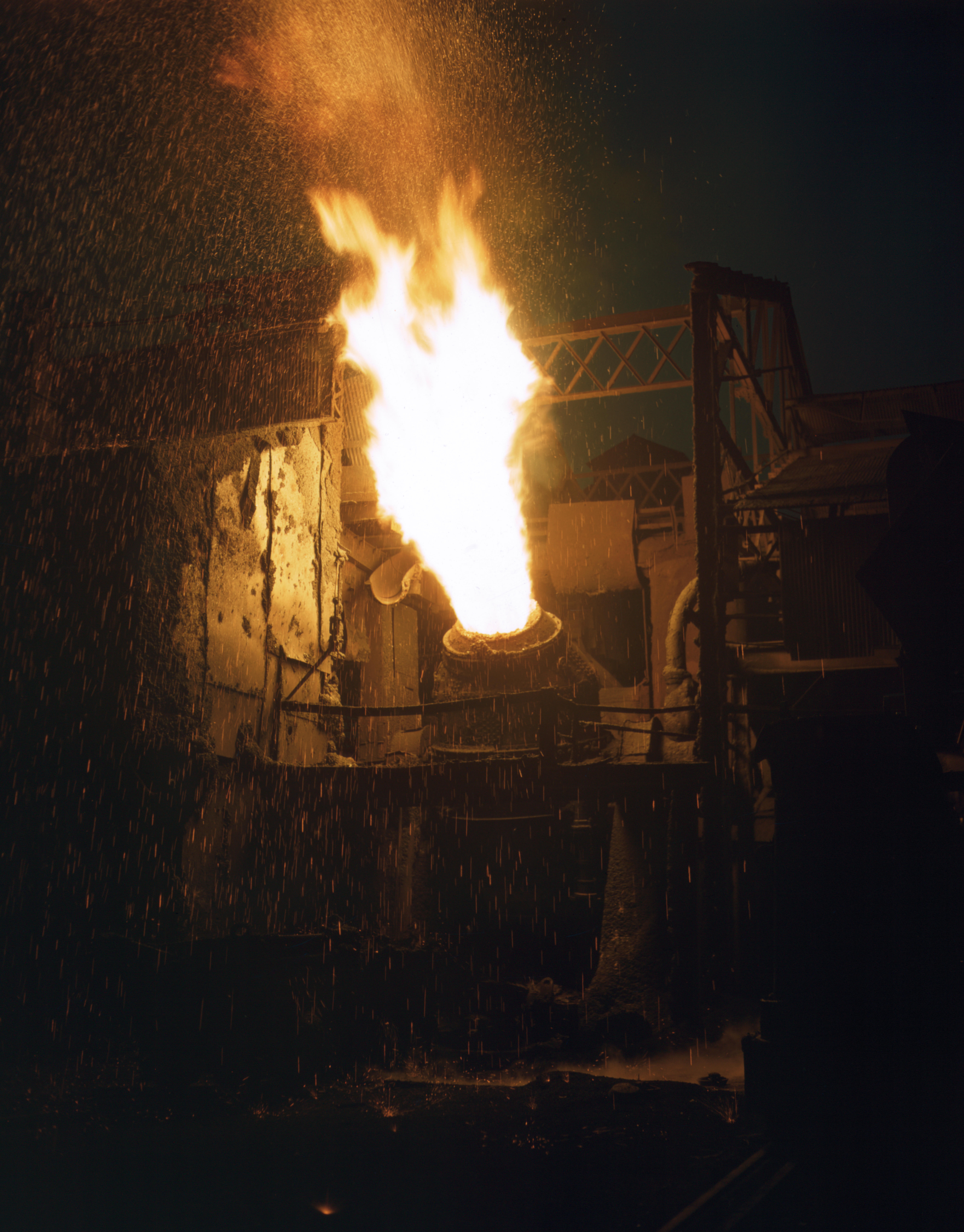
Molten iron is blown in an Eastern Bessemer converter to change it to steel for war essentials, 1941

=== Origins and rise to prominence ===
In 1927, Cyrus S. Eaton acquired and combined Republic with several other small steel companies, with the goal of becoming large enough to rival U.S. Steel. The newly named Republic Steel Corporation was headquartered in Cleveland, Ohio, and became America's third largest steel company, trailing only U.S. Steel and Bethlehem Steel after acquiring Bourne-Fuller Company and the Central Alloy Steel Company (located in Massillon, Ohio) in the 1930s.

In April 1937 Republic acquired all assets and debts of the Gulf States Steel Company for 2+1/3 shares of Republic stock for each share of Gulf Steel stock. This was the first time Republic controlled steel making and rolling facilities in the South in its new Gulf State district in Gadsden, Alabama, to complement its mine and pig iron production facilities in the company's Birmingham district.

Tom M. Girdler became the first chairman of the board of directors. Eaton hired Girdler from Jones and Laughlin Steel Company, where he had served as president. Girdler modernized Republic Steel with the introduction of better alloys such as "light steel". During World War II, while still chairman of Republic Steel, Girdler relocated to California to serve as chief executive officer of Consolidated Aircraft, a military aircraft manufacturer. Following the war, Girdler left Consolidated to run Republic's aviation department.

Republic Steel was known for its labor problems during the Depression. On Memorial Day, May 26, 1937, a strike escalated into the Memorial Day massacre of 1937, in which Chicago police fired into an unarmed group of protesters, and killed ten, four outright. This was documented by the 1937 short film Republic Steel Strike Riot Newsreel Footage. Girdler never signed the labor contract.

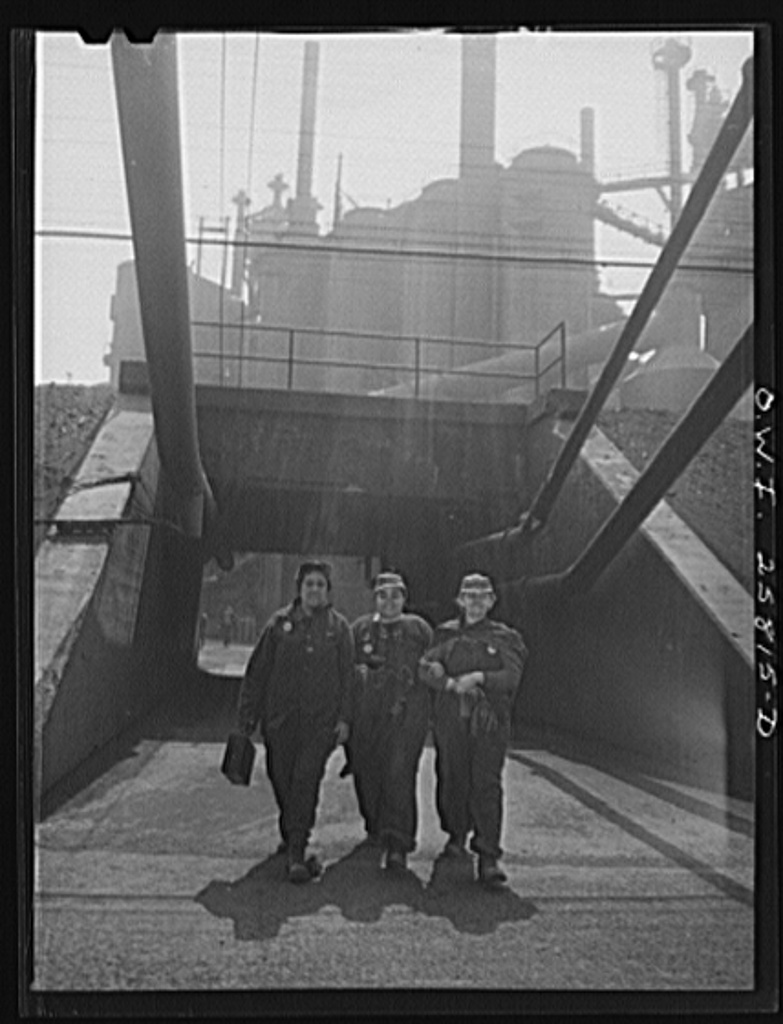
Female workers leave the Republic Steel plant in Buffalo, New York in 1943.

When Girdler retired in 1945, Charles M. White was named chairman of the company. White was a protégé of Girdler's at Jones & Laughlin Steel, and was appointed assistant vice president in charge of operations at Republic Steel in May 1930. Five years later, when Girdler was appointed president of Republic Steel, White was promoted to take over Girdler's role as vice president of operations. In 1945, White was elected president of Republic Steel by the company's board of directors. He replaced Rufus Wysor, who retired. In 1960, at the age of 70, Charles M. White retired as chairman of Republic Steel. He remained on the board of directors until 1966, and was given the title of honorary chairman.

Thomas Patton, a private attorney who worked on the merger that formed Republic Steel was hired in 1936 to form Republic's internal legal department. As general counsel in the 1930s and 1940s, he negotiated with workers on behalf of management during the steel strikes. He went on to become president, then chief executive and chairman.

Old Republic Steel logo

=== Innovations ===
Republic Steel built a steel rolling mill in 1958 in Cotorro, Cuba. Plant manager Ernest Breedlove fled Cuba with his new Cuban bride when Fidel Castro confiscated the plant and shipped the newly installed machinery to the Soviet Union. Breedlove built another modern plant for Compania Fundidora de Fierro y Acero de Monterrey, S. A. in Monterrey Mexico and later pioneered the mini-mill concept at Nucor Steel.

Republic Steel was one of the last major steel firms to use low-phosphorus Adirondack magnetites, operating the Chateaugay Ore & Iron Company in Lyon Mountain, New York from 1939 to 1967. The Chateaugay mine was one of the deepest commercial iron ore mines in the United States, with stopes as much as 3,500 feet (1,050 m) below the surface.

=== Decline, merger, and re-launch ===
Republic Steel remained prosperous until the 1970s, when rising foreign imports, labor costs, and other factors caused severe stress at Republic and throughout the steel industry in the U.S.

In 1984, Republic merged into the Jones and Laughlin Steel Company subsidiary of the LTV Corporation, with the new entity being known as LTV Steel. An employee stock ownership plan bought LTV's steel bar division and renamed it Republic Engineered Steels in 1989. In 1998, Republic Engineered Steels merged with Bar Technologies to become Republic Technologies International. Republic Engineered Products was established in December 2003 with the purchase of operating assets from Republic Engineered Products LLC. In July 2005 RES was acquired by Industrias CH, S.A de C.V. (ICH). In September 2011 RES changed its name to Republic Steel.

=== Recent history ===
In April 2014, the company agreed to pay a $2.4 million fine to the Occupational Safety and Health Administration (OSHA) and agreed to "settle alleged health and safety violations" at four Republic Steel facilities—in Canton, Lorain and Massillon in Ohio, and in Blasdell, New York. OSHA said they found over 100 violations of health and safety at the facilities run by Republic.

In August 2023, Republic Steel announced it would indefinitely idle steelmaking operations in Canton and Lackawanna, New York, ending leaded steel production in the United States. Grupo Simec cited a competitive market, increasing input costs, and the 2021–2023 inflation surge.

== See also ==
- Birmingham District
- Memorial Day massacre of 1937
- Little Steel strike
