= Raceway Park (Illinois) =

Stock car race track in Blue Island, Illinois

Coordinates: 41°39′25″N 87°39′33″W

Raceway Park (1938–2000) was a quarter-mile stock car race track located in Blue Island, Illinois, on 130th Street and Ashland Avenue between Western Avenue and Halsted Avenue, used for stock car races from the mid-1930s until 2000. In all advertising, it was billed as being located in Blue Island, Illinois, but was really located right across the border in the town of Calumet Park.

== History ==
Raceway Park had originally been created as a dog racing track, but in the early 1930s, the state of Illinois made dog racing illegal. Harry Malone then led a group promoting the track as a midget car track. Raceway finally opened for competitive racing on September 24, 1938. The winner of the first race was Harry McQuinn, who eventually went on to compete in the Indianapolis 500. The track had changed management many times during the early 1940s. Art Folz and Wally Zale assumed the management position in 1940, but their management reign was cut short when Zale was killed in a car-train wreck in 1942. Then, World War II stopped all racing in America for the time being. Rudy Nichels started promoting the track after the war but with only limited success. The track was demolished in the early 2000s and is now the site of the Raceway Park Center a shopping center that houses Ultra Foods, AJ Wright and Aldi Food Store among other businesses

== The Jenin Brothers ==
Pete and Nick Jenin purchased the land in 1947, and immediately made drastic changes. The Jenin's slightly banked the oval, erected grandstands and concessions, and purchased more land for more parking. In 1951 the track was changed from clay to asphalt. In the same year, an 80-race season took place. During its prime, races were held Wednesday, Friday, Saturday, and Sunday. The track soon took on the nickname "World's Busiest Track". The track became so popular that the Jenin brothers entertained the thought of racing 7 days a week, so they could handle the massive crowds.

== The end of the Jenin Brothers partnership ==
In 1952 Nick Jenin sold his share of the track to Jimmy Derrico. Derrico accompanied Pete Jenin in the ownership of the oval until 1968. The track was then leased to N. Perry Luster of National Racing Affiliates Insurance fame. In 1970 Peter Jenin became the sole promoter of the track. During Jenins' second term as track promoter the track was repaved, the pits were expanded, a digital scoreboard was erected, and a bandstand was also erected. In 1980 Jenin wanted to spend more time on his other business, so he joined a 5- man promotional team. But the pact was voided in 1982 and Jenin once again became the sole owner of the track.

== The Koehler and Pronger Era ==
Bud Koehler racked up 490 career wins at Raceway Park and 11 late-model track championship awards before retiring in 1979. Bob Pronger raced in the Daytona 500 and won the Raceway Park late-model championship in 1961 and 1969 and compiled 148 career wins at Raceway. - Short track Racing Magazine January 1994- Article by Rick Dal Corobbo. In Memory of Rick Dal Corobbo.

== Track Champions ==
=== Midgets ===
- 1939 Ted Duncan
- 1940 Ted Duncan
- 1941 Tony Bettenhausen
- 1942 Tony Bettenhausen
- 1945 Tony Bettenhausen
- 1946 Mike O'Halloran
- 1947 Tony Bettenhausen
- 1948 Ray Richards
- 1949 Bud Koehler
- 1950 Eddie Russo
- 1951 Bud Koehler
- 1952 Bud Koehler
- 1959 Bob Tattersall
- 1960 Russ Sweedler
- 1961 Mel Kenyon
- 1971 Tom Steiner
- 1977 Bob Richards
- 1982 Mack McClellan
- 1987 John Warren
- 1988 John Warren
- 1989 Steve Thinnes

=== Convertibles ===
- 1955 Bob Button

=== Novices ===
- 1957 Augie Wolf
- 1958 Bill Heyser
- 1959 Ed Kilpatrick
- 1960 Rich Miller
- 1966 Wayne Adams Jr.
- 1967 Jerry Welch

=== Rookies ===
- 1961 Wayne Bowdish
- 1962 Don Saynay

=== Claiming ===
- 1963 Ray Freeman
- 1964 Ron Wilkerson

=== Amateurs ===
- 1964 Ray Para
- 1965 Ray Para
- 1970 Chuck Manis

=== 6-Cylinders ===
- 1968 Johnny Buben
- 1969 Vern Mullennix
- 1971 Mel McKeever
- 1972 George Abbott
- 1973 Guy Carnagey
- 1974 Tom Nielsen
- 1975 Al Stutchel
- 1976 Bruce O'Dell

=== Modifieds ===
- 1970 Whitey Harris
- 1971 Johnny Reimer

=== Mini-Stocks ===
- 1970 Dave Decker
- 1971 Dave Decker
- 1975 Klaus Wever
- 1976 Bob Reiter
- 1984 Alberto Cabrera
- 1985 Alberto Cabrera
- 1986 Alberto Cabrera
- 1987 Ben Slachta
- 1988 Russ Foust
- 1989 Dave Botkin

=== Sportsmen ===
- 1971 Jeff Koehler
- 1979 Leo Mens
- 1980 Terry Laxton
- 1981 Jake Oudshoorn

=== Spectator ===
- 1982 Jim Gilbert
- 1983 Ron Deutsch
- 1984 Ron Deutsch
- 1985 John Rastovsky
- 1986 Bob Wall
- 1987 Bob Wall
- 1988 Randy Gifford
- 1989 Chuck Janko
- 1990 John Brolick
- 1991 Scott Cicuto

=== Semi-Pros ===
- 1993 Mike Carpenter
- 1994 Joe Jones
- 1995 Joe O'Connor
- 1996 Mark Olejniczak
- 1997 Bob Cagle
- 1998 Louie Pasderetz
- 1999 John Senerchia
- 2000 Bill Neering

=== Dwarf Cars ===
- 1998 Jeff Scherer
- 1999 Roger Osborne
- 2000 Al Claps

=== Late Model ===
- 1949 Bud Koehler
- 1950 Hal Ruyle
- 1951 Bill Van Allen
- 1952 Bud Koehler
- 1953 Bryant Tucker
- 1954 Bud Koehler
- 1955 Tom Cox
- 1956 Bob Button
- 1957 Bud Koehler
- 1958 Bill Van Allen
- 1959 Bob Williams
- 1960 Harry Simonsen
- 1961 Bob Pronger
- 1962 Ray Young
- 1963 Bill Cornwall
- 1964 Bud Koehler
- 1965 Ted Janecyk
- 1966 Bud Koehler
- 1967 Bud Koehler
- 1968 Jerry Kemperman
- 1969 Bob Pronger
- 1970 George Hill
- 1971 Ray Freeman
- 1972 Bud Koehler
- 1973 Ray Young
- 1974 Bud Koehler
- 1975 Bud Koehler
- 1976 Bud Koehler
- 1977 Larry Middleton
- 1978 Larry Middleton
- 1979 Dave Weltmeyer
- 1980 Dave Weltmeyer
- 1981 Bob Weltmeyer
- 1982 Bob Weltmeyer
- 1983 Dave Weltmeyer
- 1984 Pat Echlin
- 1985 Wayne Para
- 1986 Mike Pockrus
- 1987 Jim Johnson
- 1988 Mike White
- 1989 Joe Witkowski
- 1990 Joe Witkowski
- 1991 Pat Echlin
- 1992 Pat Echlin
- 1993 Pat Echlin
- 1994 John Brolick
- 1995 Kevin Reidy
- 1996 Gary Raven
- 1997 John Brolick
- 1998 Gary Raven
- 1999 Kevin Reidy
- 2000 Kevin Reidy

=== Hobby Stocks ===
- 1973 Jack Thomas
- 1974 Dave Urewicz
- 1975 Burt Weitemeyer
- 1976 Jerry Clark
- 1977 Al Ponton
- 1978 Barbara Bosak
- 1979 Don Helwig
- 1980 Mike Varner
- 1981 Scott Sterkowitz
- 1982 Craig Johnson
- 1985 Dennis Ponton
- 1986 Bob Copley
- 1987 John Hargus
- 1988 Hank Pugh
- 1989 Tony Meier
- 1990 Mike Tobuch
- 1991 Mike Tobuch

=== Hobby Stock Cadets ===
- 1978 Jack Annen

=== Hobby Stock Class A ===
- 1983 Paul Yancick
- 1984 Dave Duckworth

=== Hobby Stock Class B ===
- 1983 Dan Weltmeyer
- 1984 Dan Deutsch

=== Street Stocks ===
- 1992 Don Kritenbrink
- 1993 Rob Delinsky
- 1994 Ron Haney
- 1995 Mike Szekley
- 1996 Guy Baumann
- 1997 Russ Vankuiken
- 1998 D.J. Helwig
- 1999 Ryan Dix
- 2000 Scott Gardner

=== Enduros ===
- 1991 Lennord Napoleon Car No.12 Peotone, IL
- 1992 Peter Hernandez
- 1993 Alan Powell
- 1994 Pat O'Rourke
- 1995 Keith Volkman
- 1996 Don Ackerman, Car No. 27, Homewood, IL
- 1997 Mike Buder
- 1998 Kent DeGraff
- 1999 Frank Flory, Car No. 8, Homewood, IL
- 2000 Eddie Wolf
