= Little Steel strike =

1937 labor strike throughout the American steel industry

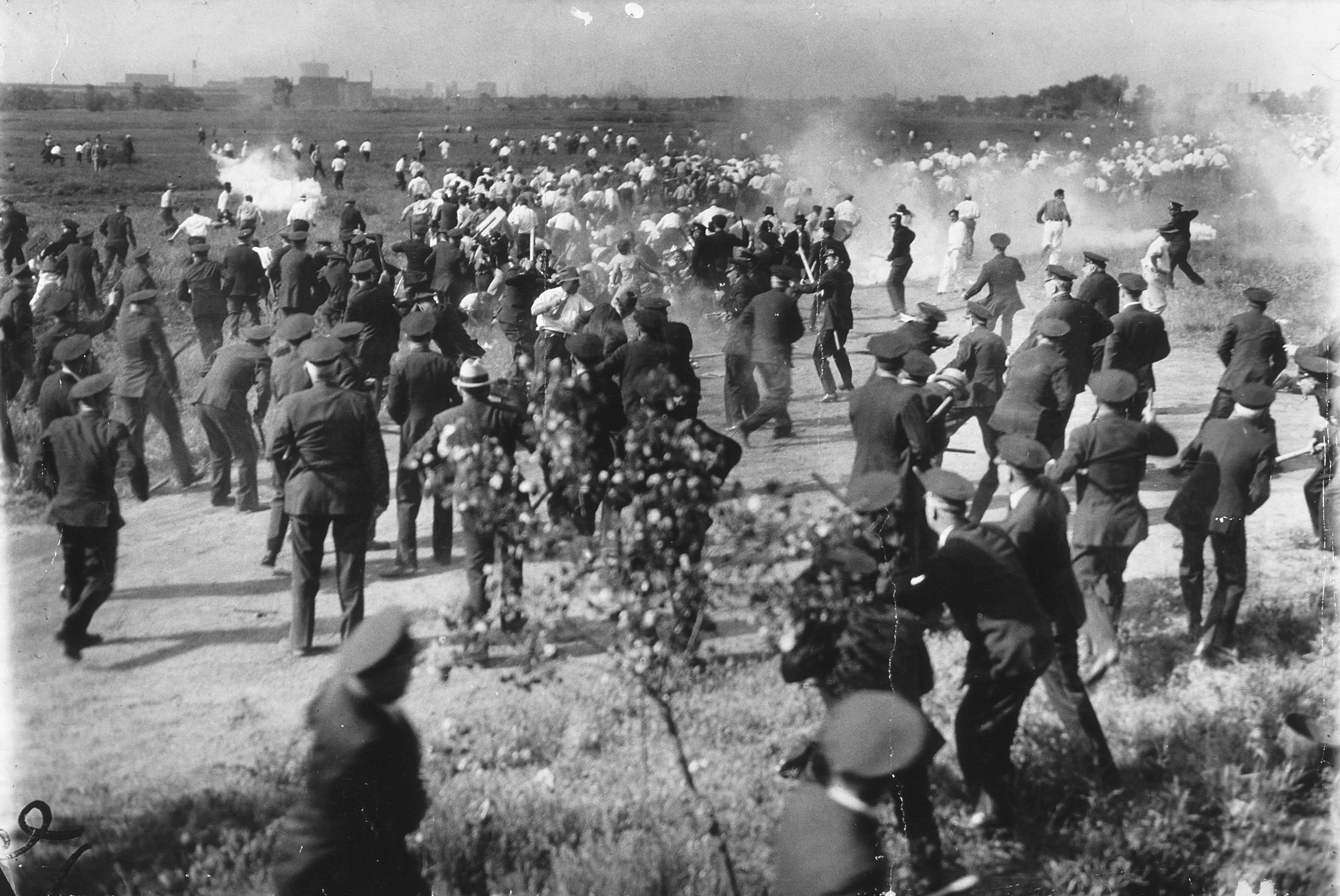
1937 Memorial Day massacre at the Republic Steel Company, Chicago (May 30, 1937)

The Little Steel strike was a 1937 labor strike by the Congress of Industrial Organizations (CIO) and its branch the Steel Workers Organizing Committee (SWOC), against a number of smaller steel producing companies, principally Republic Steel, Inland Steel, and Youngstown Sheet and Tube Company. The strike affected a total of thirty different mills belonging to the three companies, which employed 80,000 workers. The strike, which was one of the most violent labor disputes of the 1930s, ended without the strikers achieving their principal goal, recognition by the companies of the union as the bargaining agent for the workers.

On March 13, 1937, the United States Steel Corporation (US Steel) signed a historic collective bargaining agreement with SWOC. The agreement provided for a standard pay scale, an 8-hour work day, and time and a half for overtime. Although US Steel ("Big Steel") signed the deal, there were smaller companies that refused to sign. That is why the strike is known as the "Little Steel" strike: US Steel Corporation was so massive that it gave rise to the moniker "Little Steel" for its four smaller competitors, Republic Steel Corporation, Bethlehem Steel Corporation, Youngstown Sheet & Tube Company, and Inland Steel Company, each ranked among the hundred largest firms in America.

The strike did not start immediately. In fact, there was an expectation that Little Steel would follow Big Steel's lead and sign a deal with SWOC. On March 30, 1937, SWOC proposed an agreement similar to the one with US Steel to Little Steel. The proposal sought an eight-hour work day, a forty-hour work week, overtime pay, a $5-per-day minimum wage, paid vacations, health and safety standards, seniority, and procedures for resolving grievances. Rather than sign, Little Steel representatives met, debated, dragged their feet, sent spies to infiltrate SWOC, and prepared for actual battle. The companies bought poison gas and other weapons, hired private police, donated weapons to law enforcement, encouraged law enforcement to hire more deputies, stocked their plants with food and bedding, installed search lights and barbed wire, and fired hundreds of union workers.

The Little Steel Strike started on May 26, 1937, when the US economy was just starting to recover from the Great Depression. Steel workers, represented by the CIO affiliated Steel Workers Organizing Committee (SWOC) participated in protests ranging from sit-ins to picket lines. Within days of SWOC's authorization of the strike, 67,000 workers were off the job and the scattered violence that began to erupt was a harbinger of more dire things to come.

The strike is characterized as one of the most violent strikes of the 1930s, with thousands of strikers arrested, three hundred injured and eighteen dead. The Little Steel companies eventually defeated the strike, which lasted just over five months time. However, groundwork for the unionization of the Little Steel industry was set and the goal to unionize Little Steel occurred five years later, in 1942, during the early years of World War II.

== Background ==
Early in 1937 the large American steel companies ("big steel") were facing union pressure. The success of several sit down strikes in the automobile industry and the rising strength of unions made US Steel chairman Myron C. Taylor very hesitant to confront the unions. The pressure from other union successes throughout the industry and also the persistent work of the Congress of Industrial Organizations (CIO) made Taylor decide to agree with CIO president John L. Lewis to recognize the newly created branch of the CIO, the Steel Workers Organizing Committee (SWOC), as the sole agent for his company on March 2, 1937. By signing the union contract, Taylor started a domino effect, and other steel companies began signing union contracts with very little fight, many just at the slightest rumor of a strike. Several steel companies, who held very strong anti-union, anti-labor stances, such as Jones and Laughlin, signed union contracts following US Steel, sending a message through the industry, and giving SWOC legitimacy. The contracts had greater benefits than simply turning the mills into closed shops. Workers also received pay raises, forty-hour workweeks, and one-week vacations, along with three guaranteed holidays. The achievements gave SWOC and the CIO the confidence to expand into the smaller-market Little Steel Industry.

After Jones & Laughlin signed union contracts, signing with the smaller steel producers ("little steel") became the next goal of the CIO. The three main targets were decided to be Republic Steel, Youngstown Sheet and Tube Company, and Inland Steel Corporation, which owned mills across the Midwest and Northeast United States, with close to thirty mills between the three of them. The three companies became the focus of the CIO from status that they held within the Little Steel industry, like that of US Steel in the Big Steel industry, powerhouses of their industry. After big steel unionized, Lewis immediately tried to convince these little steel companies to sign SWOC union contracts similar to those signed by US Steel, just weeks earlier. The hope was to hit the powerhouses early in the movement to send a message throughout the industry for negotiations with smaller companies. However, the three companies refused the contracts without hesitation, as they had withstood unionization before, and refused to sign with SWOC.

== Organization ==
United States Steel Corporation.

After the contracts were rejected, CIO and SWOC immediately began planning to organize the smaller steel companies. The SWOC had two major ideas behind their organizing drive: "overcoming, by successfully organizing all groups of workers, the racial and ethnic conflicts that had crippled earlier efforts to organize steel workers; and infiltrating and co-opting the company unions." The CIO immediately began placing union representatives within the mills of the companies. The representatives were often met with harassment and beatings by spies placed within the union by the companies to prevent unionization. As word of unionization spread, the SWOC was able to gain the quick support of many black steel workers mainly in the Chicago mills from their openness and willingness to accept black steel workers into the union. It was due to the black support that the SWOC was able to gain momentum so quickly, allowing whole mills to be involved in the movement. As May approached, it was clear that the companies were preparing for a strike. Republic Steel fired many union supporters and conducted lockouts at several other locations as a way weaken union support.

It was then that the CIO and SWOC decided they must take action. A deadline of May 26, 1937 was given to the steel companies to sign the union contracts or endure a strike. After that day passed with no response from Little Steel, John L. Lewis made an official strike call and workers walked away from their positions just hours after the deadline, shutting down almost every mill of the three largest Little Steel companies.

== Early phase ==
Within hours of the call, there was already a quicker start than most people had predicted. Union representatives were able to lay down enough groundwork and spread the word well enough for a seamless beginning to the strike across a total of eight states. Workers began picketing, marching, and holding rallies outside their respective mills trying to gain the support of those workers not already involved with the union, along with their local communities to add pressure on the companies by adding supporters. The majority of the mills were empty after the massive walkout on May 26 and unable to continue production. However, two Republic Steel mills in Youngstown, Ohio and the Southside of Chicago remained open, using around two hundred to three hundred workers who disapproved of the strike to keep the mills running. SWOC officials and striking steel workers targeted the mill in South Chicago with massive numbers of picketers and rallies, hoping to bring national attention and make keeping the mill open a nightmare for Republic Steel.

== Steelworkers' resistance ==
At the beginning of the strike, more than 50% of the striking employees were from Republic Steel. Republic Steel was headquartered in Cleveland and was among the top five steel producers in the country. By 1942 Republic Steel housed 9,000 workers which made it one of the top employers in the city of Cleveland.

=== Memorial Day massacre of 1937 ===
The Republic Steel South Chicago mill was home to largest arsenal and police force involved in the labor dispute. Police maintained a line made up of 150 police officers in front of the gate to keep strikers at a distance safe enough for the mill to still be productive and running smoothly. The South Chicago mill was one of two steel mills still open.

On Memorial Day 1937, the third day of the Little Steel Strike, more than 1500 SWOC members and their families were gathered at a park just a few blocks from the front gate of the mill for a march planned for the day. The atmosphere was festive and picnic-like. There were a large number of women and children in the group. As Steelworker Jesse Reese of Youngstown Sheet and Tube recalled, "Republic Steel was scabbing. So we went to South Chicago with truckloads of people, working-class people." Republic had long been anticipating a strike and fortified the factory. There were loyal employees stationed there around the clock. There was a stockpile of munitions, including poison gas. That Memorial Day, there were approximately 250 city police and twenty to thirty private police forming a defensive perimeter around the plant. They were armed with revolvers, nightsticks, blackjacks, and hatchet handles.

Because of the large number of protesters, an additional two hundred police officers were called in to protect the mill by cutting the crowd off a block away from the mill by creating a line cutting access to the gate. With no access to the plant, more and more angry protesters began crowding in front of the line of officers, arguing to let them pass and continue as they meant no harm and wished to continue their planned march. As the protesters and police argued, the conversations became heated, and violence followed. Some reported that protesters in the back of the crowd began throwing sticks and stones and whatever else they could get their hands on, hitting several officers. The officers panicked and opened fire on the crowd. Soon ten protesters lay dead and 100 more with gunshot wounds. One steelworker later recounted, "I was in the war and I fought in France, but I never heard so many bullets as those coppers fired. Women and children were screaming all over the place. They were like a herd of cattle panic stricken. I ran till they got me. I saw one woman shot down and a policeman dragged her away." Scores of club-wielding police were beating people, men and women, black as well as white, and firing gas weapons and firearms, striking down dozens. Jesse Reese, a black man, observed: "I'd never seen the police beat women, not white women". The incident later became known as the Memorial Day massacre of 1937.

Of the twenty-three people killed or seriously injured in the Memorial Day Massacre identifiable as steel workers, eighteen were married and eight were at least forty years old. Middle-aged family men were not the only victims of the Memorial Day Massacre: an eleven-year-old boy, Nicholas Levrich (or Leverich, or Leurich), was hit in the ankle, a baby was wounded in the arm, and as discussed below, two women were shot in the legs. All in all, four demonstrators died of gunshot wounds on or near the scene; six others died over the next three weeks, also of gunshot wounds. Another thirty demonstrators were shot and sixty were otherwise injured, for a total of around one hundred significant casualties, of which around ten involved permanent disability. Thirty-five police were injured, but none of their injuries, besides a broken arm, was serious.

A notable example of police misbehavior was the treatment of pro-union victims of the Massacre. Although the police brought in ambulances for their men, they did little to aid grievously wounded demonstrators and did not even bother to use their stretchers to carry the injured. One shooting victim, Earl Handley, probably died when the police removed him from a union car, marked with a red cross, which was trying to take him to a hospital, slipped a tourniquet that was stopping him from bleeding to death, and piled him, blood pouring from a severed artery in his thigh, with fifteen other people into a patrol wagon.

After the incident, Little Steel's public relation team sent out multiple reports justifying the actions of the Chicago police force. Reports began coming in claiming that the protesters were armed and planned to raid the mill and that the protesters were led by marijuana-smoking communists.

With both local police forces and the National Guard on the side of Little Steel, the situation deteriorated for the strikers after the events of the Memorial Day massacre. The events of the massacre turned what seemed to be a peaceful strike of picketing and the occasional rally march into five months of arrests, beatings and several more deaths across the Midwest and Northeast as more conflicts emerged between Little Steel (mostly Republic Steel) and the SWOC protesters.

=== Other confrontations ===
The Republic Steel mill in Youngstown, Ohio, one of the two mills to remain open, had a conflict just less than a month later. On June 19, 300 officers were working at the mill, and a large number of picketers were outside of mill property. After a woman made a comment that embarrassed one of the officers on patrol duty about how to do his job correctly, things escalated quickly, leading to gas canisters to be fired directly into the crowd of protesters. A massive riot then ensued, the "Women's day massacre", leading to a gunfight between the heavily armed officers and the protesters that lasted well into the night leaving dozens injured and two dead. Many were arrested after the event, many of which were through home raids of those who were prominent in the strike in the area.

Another example of strike violence was an event that occurred on July 11 in Massillon, Ohio, when a company agent somehow came into the control of the local police force and rallied to attack the local union headquarters. The police force completely destroyed the building, two unionists were killed, and one hundred and sixty five were brutally arrested, some still in their pajamas and held for several days without cause.

Ten days sooner, there was a strike at Inland Steel Company as well on the east side of Chicago. The strike was not as violent but ended just as abruptly.

In Monroe, at the Newton Steel Plant, the SWOC decided to organize a strike that would hopefully shut down the plant. The strike worked for a time. With almost all of the workers on strike coming from one of the main departments of the plant, that made it impossible for the other areas of the factory to operate. In addition, workers not on strike refused to cross the picket lines.

Victims of violence were labeled as troublemakers, communists, or people with disregard for the law. Officers of the companies claimed that force was needed to protect the plants and the nonstriking workers. Several governors tried to quell the violence by calling in the National Guard, which helped the employers. With the job of preventing violence, strict regulations were placed on the picketers, such as limiting the number of picketers to ten. Strikers lost hope for success, and the strike ended quickly.

=== Black unionists ===
At the time of the Little Steel Strike, about ten percent of steelworkers were black. Nearly three quarters of them were common laborers, who performed the roughest work in the hottest, dirtiest, and most dangerous departments. That meant that they bore the brunt of capricious workplace policies. Not surprisingly, then, they found the idea of rationalizing employment policies by unionism attractive. That was true despite their justifiable skepticism of unionism based on the unions' history of discrimination against and outright exclusion of blacks. Ultimately, blacks and whites alike recognized that an integrated union was an imperative, black steelworkers deserved to be part of the union, and an industrial union that excluded them did not warrant the name. Many unions made a point of reaching out to black-dominated institutions, recruiting blacks to their cause, and insuring that they had blacks in leadership positions within their organizations. With that backdrop, black union supporters, including Ben Careathers, a veteran organizer who had agitated on behalf of the "Scottsboro Boys", Hosea Hudson, an Alabama steelworker later renowned as a civil rights pioneer, Henry Johnson, the college-educated son of a union man, George Kimbley, the first full-time black person on staff with SWOC, Leondies McDonald, an organizer in the steel and meatpacking industries who had the ability to recruit people of all races to the union, Jesse Reese, discussed above, and Eleanor Rye, a journalist for a prominent black newspaper and one of a handful of black women organizers, became important players in the 1937 Little Steel Strike.

=== Women in the trenches ===
The Little Steel Strike unfolded at a time when few married women held regular jobs outside the home. Nevertheless, women played a meaningful role in the conflict. They walked picket lines, led marches, and risked life and limb to press the union's cause. Three days before the Memorial Day Massacre, for instance, a woman was one of three people leading a column of some 700 to 1000 people to a Republic Steel plant in Chicago, Illinois. On the day of the Massacre, moreover, ten to fifteen percent of the marchers were women. Two of them, Tillie Brazell and Catherine Nelson, were shot in the legs by company agents. The very next month, at Republic's "Stop 5" gate in Youngstown, Ohio, on Women's Day, on the picket line, some fifteen women were demonstrating when a belligerent city police captain reproached them, as women, for doing so. Moments later, the same officer started a violent confrontation that ultimately turned deadly; at least seven women were injured, four of them by gunfire.

== Afterward ==
With so many of the unionists on strike being killed, beaten and arrested, the protesters quickly lost morale and motivation to continue with the strike. Protesters knew that even on a day that seemed quiet, violence could explode at any minute over the most insignificant cause, and many could no longer risk their lives for the cause of the SWOC. As one protester put it, "They imported weapons, bombs, and what-have-you and had them all set though the plants with mounted machine guns, threatening, in case something would happen that they would kill thousands of us." As police and the National Guard began enforcing court orders to vacate, the weakened and demoralized picket lines began to crumble, and after five months, the "Little Steel" Strike finally came to an end.

However the failure of the strike was not solely from violence, well-organized public relations, or the failing morale of the strikers. Right before the Little Steel strike began, the economy had slipped back into a slight depression, causing less demand for steel. Fewer employees were needed to satisfy the decreased demand. The SWOC was not able to use lost profits as a bargaining tool. It was aggressive strike breaking tactics from Little Steel, lack of organization from SWOC, and demoralized unionists that made the strike end by the end of the summer of 1937 with the companies victorious.

== Results ==
Immediately after the collapse of the strike, the Little Steel companies reopened all the mills affected. That sent a message that they had clearly won and were returning to business as usual. The Little Steel companies fired and blacklisted any worker associated with the strike. Youngstown striker Danny Thomas, a leader at one of Sheet & Tube’s plants there, recalled: "There was a group of us that was blackballed to the point that we couldn’t secure any positions or work anywhere. No one would give us a job, credit, or anything." It was through the blacklisting that the strikers were placed in an even worse situation, as many could not find work anywhere, and even if they did, they were soon fired when their employers were made aware of their position.

SWOC officials continued to work behind the scenes to unionize Little Steel. SWOC officials were eventually able to get in front of the National Labor Relations Board (NLRB) and argued that the force used against strikers broke federal labor laws. The argument was that the fact that Little Steel companies used unlawful tactics to provoke protesters and that fired workers should be reinstated. Little Steel argued that any crime against their company was unforgivable and demanded for the blacklist to stay in place. The NLRB decided that those accused of crimes during the strike were free from the blacklist unless they were found guilty or were in the process of being tried.

== World War II ==
For several years, the Little Steel conflict seemed to settle down, workers returned to work, but the SWOC was not satisfied with the results of all their effort and eventually took their case all the way to the Supreme Court. The Supreme Court then upheld the National Labor Relations Board’s ruling and told Little Steel to begin collective bargaining. By 1942, the economy had recovered due to the war. The demand for steel was higher than it had been in years, leading to Little Steel to begin hiring workers by the thousands, and SWOC saw its opportunity to pounce on the desperate Little Steel industry.

Rumor of another strike began to circulate, making Little Steel owners extremely nervous because of the high government pressure to maintain production for the war effort and because of the risk of lost profits and lost contracts due to slowdowns. The National War Labor Board attempted to persuade Little Steel to accept the terms of unionization. Little Steel management surrendered instantly. Republic Steel was even forced to pay twenty million dollars' worth of back pay to those blacklisted in 1937. At last, Little Steel became unionized.

== See also ==
- Strikes in the United States in the 1930s
- List of worker deaths in United States labor disputes
- Isaiah Sol Dorfman
- Jesse Reese

== Sources and further reading ==
- Brooks, Robert R. R. As steel goes ... Unionism in a basic industry (Yale UP, 1940) online
- Baughman, James L. (1978). "Classes and Company Towns: Legends of the 1937 Little Steel Strike". Ohio History: 175–192.
- Clark, Paul F. et al. eds. Forging a Union of Steel: Philip Murray, SWOC, and the United Steel Workers (ILR Press, 1987).
- Cook, Philip L. "Tom M. Girdler and the Labor Policies of Republic Steel Corporation." Social Science (1967): 21-30 online
- Dennis, Michael (2012). "Chicago and the Little Steel Strike". Labor History. 53 (2): 167–204. doi:10.1080/0023656X.2012.679394. S2CID 145394831.
- Leab, Daniel J. "The Memorial Day Massacre." Midcontinent American Studies Journal 8.2 (1967): 3-17. online
- McPherson, Donald S. (1972). "The 'Little Steel' Strike of 1937 in Johnstown, Pennsylvania". Pennsylvania History: 219–238.
- Watkins, Angela. Massillon Steel: The 1937 Columbia Heights Massacre, (2025, Independently Published). ISBN 979-8-2856-9684-1.
- White, Ahmed (2016). The Last Great Strike: Little Steel, the CIO, and the Struggle for Labor Rights in New Deal America. University of California Press.
