= List of accidents and incidents involving the Metropolitan Transportation Authority =

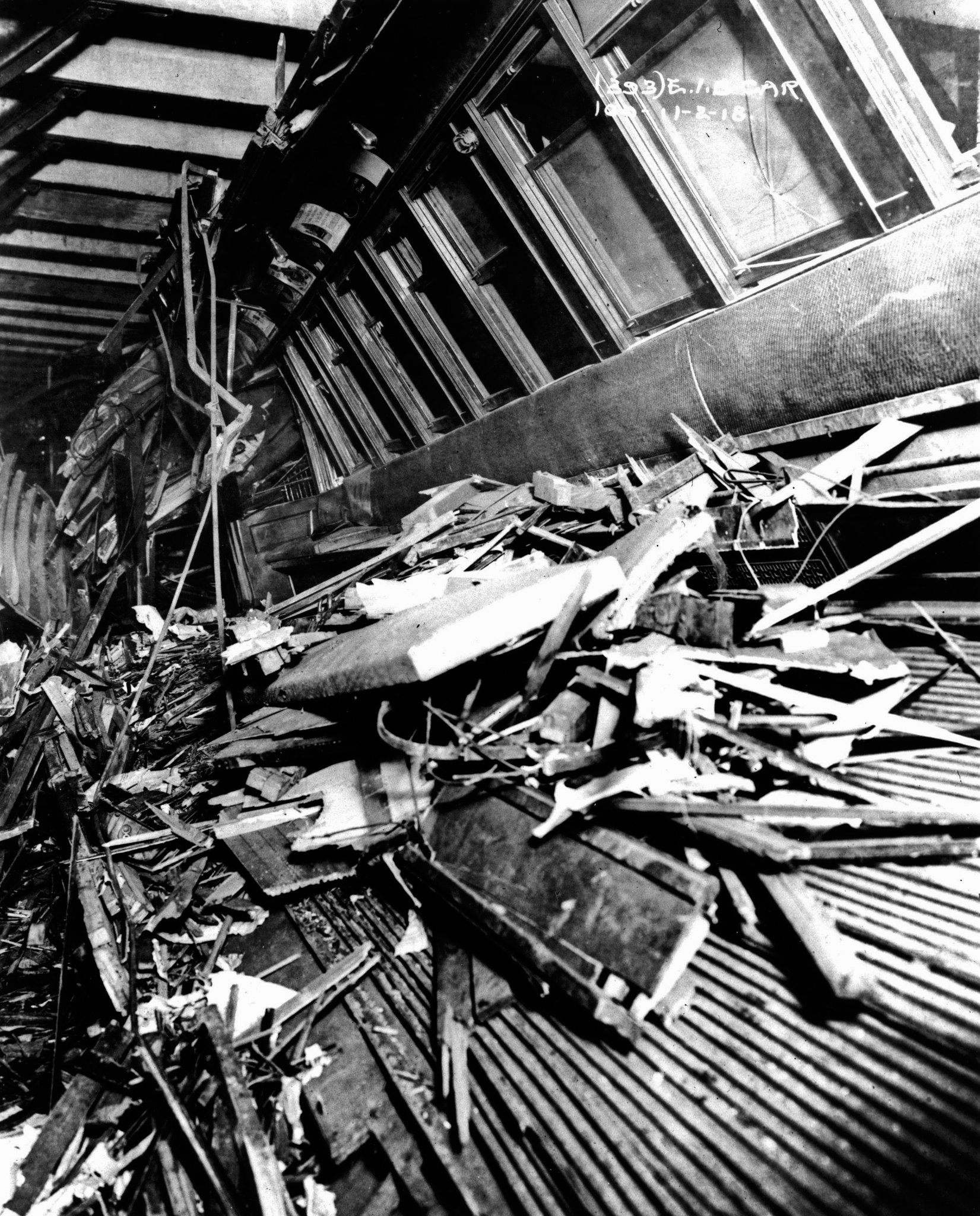
Malbone Street Wreck

Kew Gardens train crash

Valhalla train crash

The worst incidents in the MTA. From L-R: New York City Subway, Long Island Rail Road, and Metro-North Railroad.

The Metropolitan Transportation Authority (MTA), which operates public transportation services in the New York metropolitan area, has been involved in numerous accidents and incidents affecting its subway, bus, commuter rail, and other transportation services. These events have included train derailments, collisions, fires, infrastructure failures, and other incidents resulting in injuries, fatalities, service disruptions, or property damage. This list documents notable accidents and incidents involving the MTA and its operating agencies.

== Long Island Rail Road ==
=== 19th century ===
| Date | Location | Type of incident | Deaths | Injuries | Description |
|---|---|---|---|---|---|
| August 28, 1865 | Between Winfield station and Jamaica station | Collision | 5 | 6+ | A Greenport train bound for Manhattan and a train originating from Hunterspoint Avenue collided head-on while operating on the same track. |
| April 23, 1869 | Willow Tree station | Derailment | 6 | 14 | A Northport-bound train struck a fractured iron rail and derailed the cars. |
| July 4, 1872 | Between Bushwick station and Newtown switch | Collision | 3 | 20+ | A train left Bushwick station behind schedule, so to make up for the delay and to reach Newtown switch, it sped up to roughly 28 miles per hour. An excursion train from Rockaway was traveling west on the same track, and the two trains collided with each other. |
| February 3, 1875 | Between Norwood station and Woodfield station | Boiler explosion | 4 | 3 | Severe storms in Long Island had flooded out the tracks. A work train was moving backwards from Hempstead since there was no turntable. As it moved slowly, the ground collapsed underneath the train, and the boiler exploded upon hitting the cold water. |
| September 9, 1891 | Oyster Bay station | Boiler explosion | 3 | 2 | A passenger train was idling at Oyster Bay station when the boiler suddenly exploded. The noise from the explosion could be heard as far as Glen Cove. |
| June 20, 1893 | Parkville Tunnel | Train derailment | 8 | 20+ | A Manhattan Beach-bound train entered the tunnel and three cars jumped the tracks, tipping over and dragging alongside the tunnel walls. |
| August 26, 1893 | Haberman station | Collision | 16 | 40+ | A Manhattan Beach train, bound for Manhattan, and a Rockaway Beach train, also bound for Manhattan, converged on the same track and collided head-on. |

=== 20th century ===
| Date | Location | Type of incident | Deaths | Injuries | Description |
|---|---|---|---|---|---|
| October 30, 1901 | Westbury station crossing | Automobile collision | 0 | 6 | An automobile, operated by French racer Henri Fournier, struck a locomotive as it was crossing the level crossing near Westbury station. This is the first documented instance of a collision between an automobile and a train. |
| July 10, 1909 | Bay Shore station | Collision | 0 | 0 | A passenger train ran into a freight train, striking it directly. |
| January 7, 1912 | Hempstead station | Collision | 1 | 1 | A milk train was backing into the Hempstead station, and rear-ended a passenger car, sending it across Fulton Avenue and crashing into a vacant building. |
| September 22, 1913 | College Point station | Collision | 4 | 54 | A Whitestone-bound train and a Manhattan-bound train collided head-on. |
| April 15, 1918 | Veterans Memorial Highway | Derailment | 3 | 36 | A troop train, carrying 700 soldiers from the 305th Infantry Regiment, suddenly derailed and rolled down the embankment. Eight of the ten cars fell, while the first two cars and the locomotive stayed on the tracks. |
| July 30, 1924 | Sunnyside Yard | Train derailment | 1 | 50+ | An eastbound Port Washington train derailed near Harold Interlocking, the last three train cars leaving the tracks. Three railroad employees were accused on second-degree manslaughter, and one of them later served sixty days in jail. |
| August 13, 1926 | Near Calverton station | Derailment | 6 | 38 | A Greenport-bound express train was passing by Golden's Pickle Works, and a defective switch, missing a cotter pin and locking device, caused the train's second engine and its cars to careen off the rails and crash into the building. |
| October 25, 1932 | Between Amagansett station and Montauk station | Derailment | 1–2 | 1 | A dead-head train was traveling to Montauk station when, rounding a curve, it derailed and rolled over onto its side. |
| September 6, 1934 | Riverhead station | Derailment | 0 | 3 | As the train was pulling into the station, it split an open switch, overturning several cars. |
| December 4, 1934 | Bay Ridge Branch | Collision | 2 | 8–12 | A New York, New Haven and Hartford freight train and a Long Island Rail Road work train collided. Two people were arrested and charged with manslaughter. |
| November 17, 1935 | Between Aquebogue station and Jamesport station | Derailment | 0 | 0 | A rail sagged underneath the train, causing it to jump the rails. |
| September 21, 1938 | Near Quogue Wildlife Refuge | Derailment | 0 | 1 | The train tracks flooded with water from the 1938 New England hurricane, and a mail car and two cars derailed. |
| November 12, 1941 | Mineola station crossing | Automobile collision | 7 | 1 | An New York-bound express train hit a truck driving across the level crossing at Herricks Road. The gateman was arrested and charged with manslaughter. |
| August 3, 1946 | Port Washington station | Collision | 2 | 27 | An electric freight train and a Manhattan-bound train collided head-on. This was the second railroad accident in 18 hours, after an accident in Bayonne, New Jersey. |
| February 16, 1947 | Kings Park Station | Derailment | 0 | 62 | A Port Jefferson-bound train hit an open switch and derailed, with five out of the eleven cars lying on the tracks. |
| February 17, 1950 | Rockville Center station | Collision | 32 | 76–158 | A Babylon-bound train and a Penn Station-bound train diverged onto the same gauntlet track, shearing the sides of both trains. Both drivers were ultimately found innocent. |
| November 22, 1950 | Between Kew Gardens station and Jamaica station | Collision | 78 | 363 | A Hempstead-bound train was stalled in the tunnel due to a brake issue when a Babylon-bound train slammed into the rear and telescoped. This crash is the worst railroad accident in the history of the LIRR, and was one of the factors that led to the creation of the MTA. |
| April 1961 | Owls Head Wastewater Treatment Plant, Bay Ridge | Tank rupture | 0 | 0 | At night, a tank holding up to two million gallons of raw sewage ruptured and spilled on to the nearby Bay Ridge Yard. The wave knocked over a New Haven caboose and other cars, and covered the tracks with debris. This sewage tank and one at Hunts Point were reinforced with steel at the cost of $2 million. |
| August 13, 1962 | Between Woodside station and Queens Boulevard | Collision | 1 | 17 | A Manhattan-bound train hit a construction crane, which was lifting a H-beam for the Brooklyn–Queens Expressway. The crane toppled onto the tracks. |
| January 24, 1971 | Pine-Aire Drive, Brentwood | Derailment | 1 | 37 | A tampered switch caused a locomotive and three passenger cars to overturn, and five cars jumped the tracks. |
| August 28, 1984 | Babylon station | Derailment | 0 | 2 | An eastbound train hit a concrete pillar on the platform. |
| August 25, 1988 | Huntington station crossing | Truck collision | 0 | 18 | A westbound train collided with a truck, sending five cars off the tracks and causing $2.6 million in damage. |
| March 10, 1993 | Bellerose station | Derailment | 0 | 0 | An eastbound LIRR freight train derailed, seriously crippling commuter service on multiple lines. Cash refunds were offered for serious delays. |
| December 7, 1993 | Merillon Avenue station | Mass shooting | 6 | 21 | As the Hicksville-bound train pulled into the station, passenger Colin Ferguson started shooting at passengers with a semi-automatic pistol. He was eventually subdued and sentenced to life in prison. |
| December 16, 1995 | New Hyde Park station crossing | Automobile collision | 1 | 2 | A Manhattan-bound train hit a car that, last-minute, sped onto the tracks, in an apparent act of suicide. |
| March 17, 1999 | Glen Cove station crossing | Truck collision | 0 | 0 | A flatbed truck carrying a 35-ton excavator got stuck on the tracks, and was hit by a train. The train's force caused the excavator to get knocked off. |

=== 21st century ===
| Date | Location | Type of incident | Deaths | Injuries | Description |
|---|---|---|---|---|---|
| March 10, 2004 | Bushwick Branch | Automobile collision | 0 | 4 | An unmanned locomotive rolled away from Fresh Pond Yard to Varick Avenue, striking multiple cars across multiple road crossings, and set one truck on fire. |
| March 27, 2008 | Jamaica station | Collision | 0 | 20 | An eastbound Hempstead train was switching tracks when it collided with a Huntington-bound train that was on another track. |
| November 23, 2008 | Jamaica station | Derailment | 0 | 0 | A Huntington-bound train had three of its cars jump the tracks. |
| June 4, 2013 | Between Westbury station and Hicksville station | Collision | 0 | 5 | One work train rear-ended another work train. |
| June 17, 2013 | Penn Station | Derailment | 0 | 0 | Just after departing, a Hempstead-bound train derailed inside one of the East River tunnels. |
| July 17, 2015 | Jamaica station | Collision | 0 | 0 | A westbound double-decker train was waiting for the track ahead of it to clear when an eastbound Huntington train sideswiped it, causing both trains to partially derail as well. |
| September 15, 2015 | Between Westbury station and Hicksville station | Derailment | 0 | 0 | Two freight train cars derailed and fell on the tracks. |
| January 4, 2017 | Atlantic Terminal | Collision | 0 | 103 | As the train entered the terminal, it failed to slow down, overrunning the track and colliding with the bumper block. This destroyed the bumper, crushed an employee area, partially derailed the first two cars, and caused a rail to pierce the bottom of the front car. It was found that the engineer had chronic fatigue, stemming from undiagnosed sleep apnea. |
| February 26, 2019 | Westbury station crossing | Collision | 3 | 3-7 | A vehicle–which was fleeing an earlier accident–drove through the down crossing gates. The vehicle hit an eastbound and westbound train. The eastbound train hit the car first, but kept going until it braked. The westbound train suffered more serious damage and derailed, still moving until it hit the station platform. The car burst into flames and was dragged by the westbound train. |
| May 25, 2019 | Speonk station | Collision | 0 | 0 | A Montauk-bound train sideswiped a Maintenance-of-Way (MOW) work train, causing a derailment, extensive track damage, and spilled diesel fuel. An LIRR signalman, Stuart Conklin, had claimed that he had inspected the rail bond. However, video evidence proved the opposite, and he resigned, later being federally charged with making false entries. |
| November 22, 2019 | Jamaica station | Derailment | 0 | 0 | A Babylon-bound train had just left the station when the two rear cars derailed. |
| August 3, 2023 | Jamaica station | Derailment | 0 | 13 | All eight cars of a Hempstead-bound train came off the tracks. |
| September 7, 2023 | Between Queens Village station and Elmont–UBS Arena station | Derailment | 0 | 0 | A work train was coming out the station when two of its cars derailed. |
| December 21, 2024 | Central Islip station crossing | Automobile collision | 0 | 0 | A westbound train struck and crushed a car while crossing Lowell Avenue. The driver faced multiple charges. |
| February 2, 2026 | Between Pinelawn station and Wyandanch station | Automobile collision | 0 | 3 | A Ronkonkoma-bound train struck a car at a level crossing, wrecking the car completely. |

== Metro-North Railroad ==
=== 21st century ===
| Date | Location | Type of incident | Deaths | Injuries | Description |
|---|---|---|---|---|---|
| May 17, 2013 | Between Fairfield-Black Rock station and Bridgeport station | Derailment | 0 | 65 | A New Haven-bound train derailed and was struck by a train going the opposite direction. This was the first major crash on any of the MTA commuter rail systems in over a decade. Damage was estimated at $18.5 million. |
| July 18, 2013 | Between Marble Hill station and Spuyten Duyvil station | Derailment | 0 | 0 | A freight train carrying solid waste partially derailed, causing over $800,000 in damage and shutting down commuter service on the line for two weekends. A report blamed Metro-North for inadequate inspections and maintenance. |
| September 25, 2013 | New Haven Line | Power outage | 0 | 0 | An unplanned power outage shut down the line for 12 days. |
| December 1, 2013 | Spuyten Duyvil station | Derailment | 4 | 61+ | A southbound train, going at almost three times the posted speed limit, entered a sharp curve and all seven cars left the tracks. The engineer had undiagnosed sleep apnea, leading to a dazed state. This is the costliest accident in the Metro-North's history. |
| February 3, 2015 | Between Valhalla station and Mount Pleasant station | Automobile collision | 6 | 15 | An earlier car accident had caused cars to be detoured near the level crossing at Commerce Street. The driver, Ellen Brody, had her sport utility vehicle (SUV) rear stuck on the crossing gates. Instead of backing away, Brody instead drove forward onto the tracks. The train struck her car, damaging rail and causing a fire. After an investigation, the fault of the collision was placed on the railroad and on Brody, though the reason why she drove forward is unknown. |

== New York City Subway ==
=== 20th century ===
| Date | Location | Type of incident | Deaths | Injuries | Description |
|---|---|---|---|---|---|
| September 11, 1905 | West 53rd Street | Derailment | 13 | 48 | A Ninth Avenue train accidently switched onto the tracks meant for the Sixth Avenue line. The train entered the curves at four times the posted limit and hurtled to the ground. This was the worst incident on the New York City elevated railways. |
| November 1, 1918 | Wilink Plaza | Derailment | 93–102 | 250 | A train entered the tunnel portal at a high speed and the second and third cars partially derailed. Because of a labor strike, the dispatcher was someone with no experience operating the line. This is the worst incident in the history of the New York City Subway. |
| August 24, 1928 | Times Square–42 Street | Derailment | 18 | 100 | When leaving the station, the first eight cars passed over the switch without an issue, but the last two cars derailed. |
| October 9, 1965 | 125th Street | Murder | 1 | 0 | Arthur Collins was stabbed to death on a southbound express train at 125th Street after he intervened to defend two elderly women from an intoxicated man, José Antonio Saldaña. Saldaña later pleaded guilty to second-degree murder. |
| January 1–13, 1966 | New York City Subway | Strike | 0 | 0 | The Transport Workers Union of America (TWU) and Amalgamated Transit Union (ATU) went on strike for 12 days, the first successful strike against the New York City Transit Authority (TA). This strike led to the Taylor Law, which limited union ability to strike. |
| April 1–11, 1980 | New York City Subway | Strike | 0 | 0 | About 33,000 members of the TWU walked out on their jobs with the goal of higher wages. They eventually got a 9% raise in their first year and 8% in their second year, but they were fined $1.25 million. |
| December 22, 1984 | 14th Street | Shooting | 0 | 4 | On a downtown 2 train, Bernhard Goetz shot four Black teenagers who he claimed were trying to rob him. One of the teenagers suffered from brain damage and was paralyzed. Goetz eventually was acquitted of murder, but he was still convicted of criminal possession of a weapon. |
| August 28, 1991 | 14th Street–Union Square | Derailment | 5 | 200+ | The motorman had been overrunning stops since Mosholu Parkway, and his performance was growing erratic as the 4 train headed down Manhattan. As it was about to enter the station, it was going too fast to stop and derailed. The motorman later served time in prison for manslaughter. |
| June 5, 1995 | Williamsburg Bridge | Collision | 1 | 69 | A westbound M train was forced to stop because of an unscheduled work train ahead of it. Another westbound J train was running at full speed and crashed into the rear end of the stopped train. |
| May 3, 2000 | 34th Street–Penn Station | Suicide attempt | 0 | 1 | Seong Sil Kim lay on the subway tracks at the station for more than 24 minutes before being struck by an E train, resulting in severe traumatic injuries. She sued the TA for negligence and substantial damages. A jury initially awarded $14 million, but the New York Supreme Court Appellate Division reversed the judgment 4–1 and dismissed the complaint, concluding that the plaintiffs failed to establish that the train operator acted negligently or that the transit authority's actions were the proximate cause of the injuries. |

=== 21st century ===
| Date | Location | Type of incident | Deaths | Injuries | Description |
|---|---|---|---|---|---|
| December 20–22, 2005 | New York City Subway | Strike | 0 | 0 | This was the third strike that the TWU carried out, with about around 34,000 members participating. This strike violated the Taylor Law, and as a result, the union was fined $2.5 million and the union leader, Roger Toussaint, served jail time. |
| December 11, 2017 | Between Times Square–42nd Street and 42nd Street–Port Authority Bus Terminal | Bombing | 0 | 4 | A pipe bomb partially exploded between the corridor connecting the two stations. The bombing was classified as a terrorist incident, and the perpetrator was sentenced to life in prison in 2021. |
| 2017–2021 | New York City Subway | Operational collapse | 0 | 0 | In June 2017, New York Governor Andrew Cuomo declared a state of emergency for the MTA, given aging infrastructure, declining on-time performance, and constant and nationalized delays. The crisis ended in June 2021, after severe financial shortfalls. |
| March 27, 2020 | 110th Street–Malcolm X Plaza | Arson | 1 | 16 | A northbound 2 train was set on fire as it pulled into the station. The station was reopened a month later. |
| January 15, 2022 | Times Square–42nd Street | Homicide | 1 | 0 | A Chinese-American woman, Michelle Go, was pushed onto the tracks into the path of an oncoming R train. This crime, happening during the time of the rise of hate crimes against East Asians, prompted the MTA to install platform screen doors at three stations as a pilot. |
| April 12, 2022 | 36th Street | Mass shooting | 0 | 29 | As a northbound N train was pulling into the station, a black supremacist threw two smoke grenades and fired 33 times. The perpetrator, Frank Robert James, was eventually caught the day after the attack, and sentenced to 10 concurrent life sentences without the possibility of parole. |
| May 1, 2023 | Between Second Avenue and Broadway–Lafayette Street | Homicide | 1 | 0 | Jordan Neely, a homeless Black man, was acting erratic, when Daniel Penny approached him and put him in a chokehold, ultimately killing him. Penny was later acquitted of all charges. |
| January 4, 2024 | 96th Street | Collision | 0 | 24 | Due to a passenger repeatedly pulling on the emergency brake, the 1 train had to stop in the tunnel. Another 1 train carrying passengers sideswiped the disabled train. |
| December 22, 2024 | Coney Island-Stillwell Avenue | Immolation | 1 | 0 | As Debrina Kawam was sleeping on a stationary F train, Sebastian Zapeta-Calil set her on fire, seemingly at random. He was arrested shortly after. |

== Regional Bus Operations ==
=== 21st century ===
| Date | Location | Type of incident | Deaths | Injuries | Description |
|---|---|---|---|---|---|
| September 18, 2017 | Main Street and Northern Boulevard, Queens | Collision | 3 | 16 | A speeding charter bus ran a red light and slammed into a Q20 bus turning on Main Street. The charter bus jumped the curb and struck a Kennedy Fried Chicken restaurant nearby, causing a small fire. The driver of the charter bus, who died in the crash, was fired from the MTA for driving under the influence. |
| January 14, 2021 | Cross Bronx Expressway, Bronx | Loss of control | 0 | 8 | While turning left off of University Avenue, a Bx35 bus turned too fast and broke the safety barriers. Since it was an accordion bus, the front half dangled off of the overpass. The driver was suspended without pay after refusing to take mandatory alcohol and drug tests. |
| June 7, 2021 | Prospect Lefferts Gardens, Brooklyn | Collision | 0 | 16 | The B49 bus jumped the curb, crashing into a three-story residential rowhouse at the corner of Lincoln Road and Bedford Avenue. Four days after the crash, the bus was finally removed after the building was stabilized. |

== Staten Island Railway ==
=== 19th century ===
| Date | Location | Type of incident | Deaths | Injuries | Description |
|---|---|---|---|---|---|
| October 5, 1861 | Prince's Bay | Collision | 1 | 0 | A 16-year-old girl, Mary Austin, was struck by a train, in the first major accident on the railroad. |
| February 24, 1894 | Between New Dorp and Grant City | Collision | 1 | 0 | A locomotive fatally struck 35-year-old James Connolly as he crossed the tracks. |

=== 20th century ===
| Date | Location | Type of incident | Deaths | Injuries | Description |
|---|---|---|---|---|---|
| September 15, 1925 | Grasmere | Truck collision | 2 | 0 | A Tottenville-bound train struck a small motor truck at a private crossing near the Grasmere station. The first car had the truck stuck underneath and thus derailed. |
| January 29, 1935 | Stapleton crossing | Collision | 0 | 20 | A slow-moving Baltimore & Ohio freight train rammed a three-car electric passenger train that had halted at the Canal Street crossing. |
| December 29, 1980 | St. George | Collision | 0 | 76 | During foggy weather and wet tracks, a rush-hour train failed to stop properly and crashed into the wall at the St. George Ferry Terminal. Later that same day, an out-of-service train also derailed due to a fractured switch mechanism. |

=== 21st century ===
| Date | Location | Type of incident | Deaths | Injuries | Description |
|---|---|---|---|---|---|
| May 17, 2023 | Eltingville | Subway surfing | 1 | 0 | A 15-year-old boy was subway surfing on top of the train when he hit his head on an overhead structure and suffered a fatal brain injury. |
