= New York City Transit Strike =

New York City Transit Strike can refer to either the:

- 1966 New York City transit strike
- 1980 New York City transit strike
- 2005 New York City transit strike
