= Roger Toussaint =

American trade unionist

Roger Toussaint is an American union boss who led the December 20th, 2005 New York City transit strike which lasted three days and shut down bus and subway service in the city. Toussaint was the president of the Transport Workers Union (TWU) Local 100 in New York City (NYC) from January 2001 through December 2009. TWU Local 100 represents the majority of hourly employees at the New York City Transit Authority (NYCTA), Manhattan and the Bronx Surface Transit Operating Authority (MaBSTOA), MTA Bus and is the largest local transportation union in the USA. As a result of this strike, the union was fined heavily and Toussaint jailed briefly. The December 2005 strike was the first strike shutting down public transportation in NYC in 25 years (the last citywide strike being in 1980).

== Early life ==
Roger Toussaint was born in 1956 in Trinidad and Tobago and emigrated to NYC at the age of 17. Toussaint's involvement in protest activities began in Trinidad and Tobago prior to his emigration. He was arrested for spray painting his school's walls with political slogans and expelled from St Mary's College, also called the College of Immaculate Concepcion (CIC) - the Trinidad equivalent of a high school in the United States. Arriving in NYC in 1974, he worked as a messenger on Wall Street before enrolling at Brooklyn College where he became active in student protests over cuts in financial aid for disadvantaged and minority students and allegations of racism. Protests occurred in most of the 19 colleges in the City University of New York (CUNY) system in the aftermath of NYC's “Big MAC” financial crisis of the mid-1970s.

In NYC, Toussaint was also involved in community organizing and protests over allegations of racism in the deaths of members of NYC's minority communities involving the New York City Police Department (NYPD). He took a series of blue-collar jobs including as a welder at the Brooklyn Navy Yard.

Toussaint took a job at New York City Transit (NYCT) as a car cleaner in 1984 and became a NYCT track worker in 1985. In 1995, Toussaint became the Chairperson of the 1,900 member TWU Local 100 Track Division, a position held until being elected president of TWU Local 100 in December 2000, taking office on January 1, 2001.

== 2005 New York City transit strike ==
The 2005 New York City transit strike actually began on December 19, 2005, at two private bus companies (Jamaica Buses Incorporated and Triboro Coach Corporation) providing public transportation whose employees were also members of TWU Local 100. On December 20, 2005, following a press conference announcement by Roger Toussaint, the 2005 New York City transit strike was extended to all Metropolitan Transportation Authority (MTA) (the MTA being the parent organization of the NYCT) locations citywide. As the MTA is a public authority, the strike at the MTA (unlike at the private bus companies) was considered illegal under the New York State (NYS) Taylor Law which prohibits strikes and concerted activity throughout the NYS public sector, subject to harsh legal penalties.

The strike was called after TWU Local 100's contract with the MTA had expired on December 15, 2005, and negotiations reached an impasse. The stalemate involved the MTA’s demand to start a new pension for future MTA employees where their contributions to the pension funds would be tripled from 2% to 6% of wages. Since the early 1970’s, pension changes in NYS became the sole purview of the NYS legislature under the same NYS Taylor Law. TWU Local 100 took the position that these pension changes were therefore not a mandatory subject of bargaining, and that it was illegal to attempt to include it in the MTA’s last and final offer.

Prior to going on strike, TWU Local 100 sought an injunction barring the MTA from including its pension demand as its "last and final offer". The union asked for this to be deemed improper and illegal under NY State law. The request for an injunction was denied. Toussaint announced that the union will not sacrifice its “unborn”. TWU Local 100 went on strike citywide. The union was joined on strike by two local units of the Amalgamated Transit Union (ATU) which represented bus workers in Staten Island and some parts of Queens in NYC.

The International TWU issued a statement demanding that Local 100 TWU members return to work immediately, in adherence to the court injunction and due to the illegality of the strike. International TWU leaders publicly noted that they believed that the strike should not have occurred since they believed that the talks were progressing, and that the last offer made by the MTA was fair and showed a willingness to compromise. Posters containing this statement were posted across transit properties which were on strike.

The 2005 New York City transit strike was called off on December 22, 2005, following the signing of an agreement between the TWU Local 100 and the MTA, which dropped its demand for pension changes. The MTA agreed to refund $131.7 million in pension payments to its employees, to a 10.5% wage increase over 3 years and to recognize Martin Luther King day as a paid holiday. The union agreed to move the contract expiration deadline from mid-December to mid-January and a first-time 1.5% employee contribution to health benefits with first-time medical coverage for its pre medicare (pre age 65) retirees. The agreement also established full paid prescription coverage for retirees.

At an April 2006 hearing before the NYS Supreme Court Roger Toussaint was issued a 10-day jail sentence, the union was fined $2.5M and its rights to automatic membership dues was ordered forfeited beginning June 2007. Toussaint turned himself in June 2006 after leading a march over the Brooklyn Bridge to the Manhattan Correctional Center (the “Tombs”) but was released after serving just 3 days. Automatic membership dues were eventually restored in the fall of 2008 after almost 18 months.

== Transit activism ==
Toussaint's activism at the MTA / NYCT began with the start of his employment as a car cleaner and continued to the Track Department where he became a union division Chairperson (1995 to 2000). Prior to running for any office, along with a handful of other trackworkers, he started a newsletter called “On Track” which both criticized the NYCT’s treatment of its employees and the union’s representation on their behalf. Toussaint was repeatedly brought up on charges, suspended and eventually terminated by NYCT in 1998. Even though by that time he was the union Chairperson of the Track Division. The termination stemmed from charges that he was in an “unauthorized” vehicle, which was the vehicle of a TWU Local 100 Staff Representative, while performing union business. The vehicle in which he was a passenger, was struck from behind. He was injured and charges were brought.

Toussaint was declared terminated after his signed appeal of those charges were turned in one day late by the union, which was in possession of his paperwork. Toussaint sued the NYCT. It was later revealed that the NYCT had paid private investigators to surveil Toussaint while he was out sick/injured. When the extensive surveillance was exposed, including trips to his son's nursery school and union meetings, his firing became a rallying cry for union members who demanded his reinstatement. His case became the subject of loud protests outside Transit Authority offices in Brooklyn and Toussaint a poster child of employer abuse and alleged union collusion.

Toussaint ran for president of TWU Local 100 in late 2000 at the head of a slate of rank and file activists called New Directions, against two slates supported by the established leadership at TWU Local 100. His New Directions slate garnered more votes than the other two slates combined and Roger Toussaint was elected president of TWU Local 100, a position be held from Jan 2001 until leaving Local 100 in Dec 2009. Toussaint declined to run for re-election at the end of 2009.

== See also ==
- 1966 New York City transit strike
- 1980 New York City transit strike
- 2005 New York City transit strike
- Trade unions
