= Theodore T. Jones =

American judge

Associate Judge of the New York Court of Appeals
- In office February 13, 2007 – November 6, 2012
- Appointed by: Eliot Spitzer
- Preceded by: Albert Rosenblatt
- Succeeded by: Sheila Abdus-Salaam

Justice of the New York Supreme Court
- In office 1990–2007

Personal details
- Born: March 10, 1944 Brooklyn, New York
- Died: November 6, 2012 (aged 68) New City, New York
- Education: Hampton University; St. John's University School of Law

Theodore Theopolis Jones Jr. (March 10, 1944 – November 6, 2012) was an American attorney and judge from the state of New York. Jones served as a justice of the New York Supreme Court from 1990 to 2007 and as a judge on the New York Court of Appeals from 2007 until his death.

== Early life, education, military service, and family ==
An African-American, Theodore Theopolis Jones Jr. was born on March 10, 1944, in Brooklyn, New York. His parents were Theodore Jones, a railroad employee, and Hortense Parker Jones, a teacher.

Jones graduated from Hampton University in 1965, receiving a Bachelor of Arts degree in History and Political Science. He served on active duty in the United States Army from 1967 to 1969 in Vietnam, achieving the rank of captain. He graduated from St. John's University School of Law in 1972.

Jones was married to the former Joan Hogans and had two sons, Wesley and Theodore III.

== Legal and judicial career ==
After working for the Legal Aid Society and as an attorney in private practice, Jones was first elected to the New York Supreme Court in 1989. Beginning in 1993, he presided over the Juvenile Offender Part in Kings County. Jones was re-elected to the Supreme Court in 2003. Jones "came to wide public attention" in 2005 when he presided over the New York City transit strike case. After Local 100 of the Transport Workers Union violated Jones's injunction and held New York City's first transit strike in 25 years, Jones "fined the union $2.5 million and sentenced its president, Roger Toussaint, to 10 days in jail for contempt of court".

Jones was appointed as an associate judge of the New York Court of Appeals by then-Governor Eliot Spitzer in January 2007. He was confirmed by the New York State Senate in February 2007 and was sworn in on February 13, 2007. In 2009, Chief Judge Jonathan Lippman appointed Jones to co-lead the Justice Task Force, which was formed in an effort to reduce the incidence of wrongful convictions.

== Death ==
Jones died of an apparent heart attack on November 6, 2012, at his New City, New York home. He was 68.

Legal offices
Preceded by Albert Rosenblatt	Associate Judge of the New York Court of Appeals; 2007–2012	Succeeded by Sheila Abdus-Salaam
