= New York City Transit Authority =

Bus and subway service operator

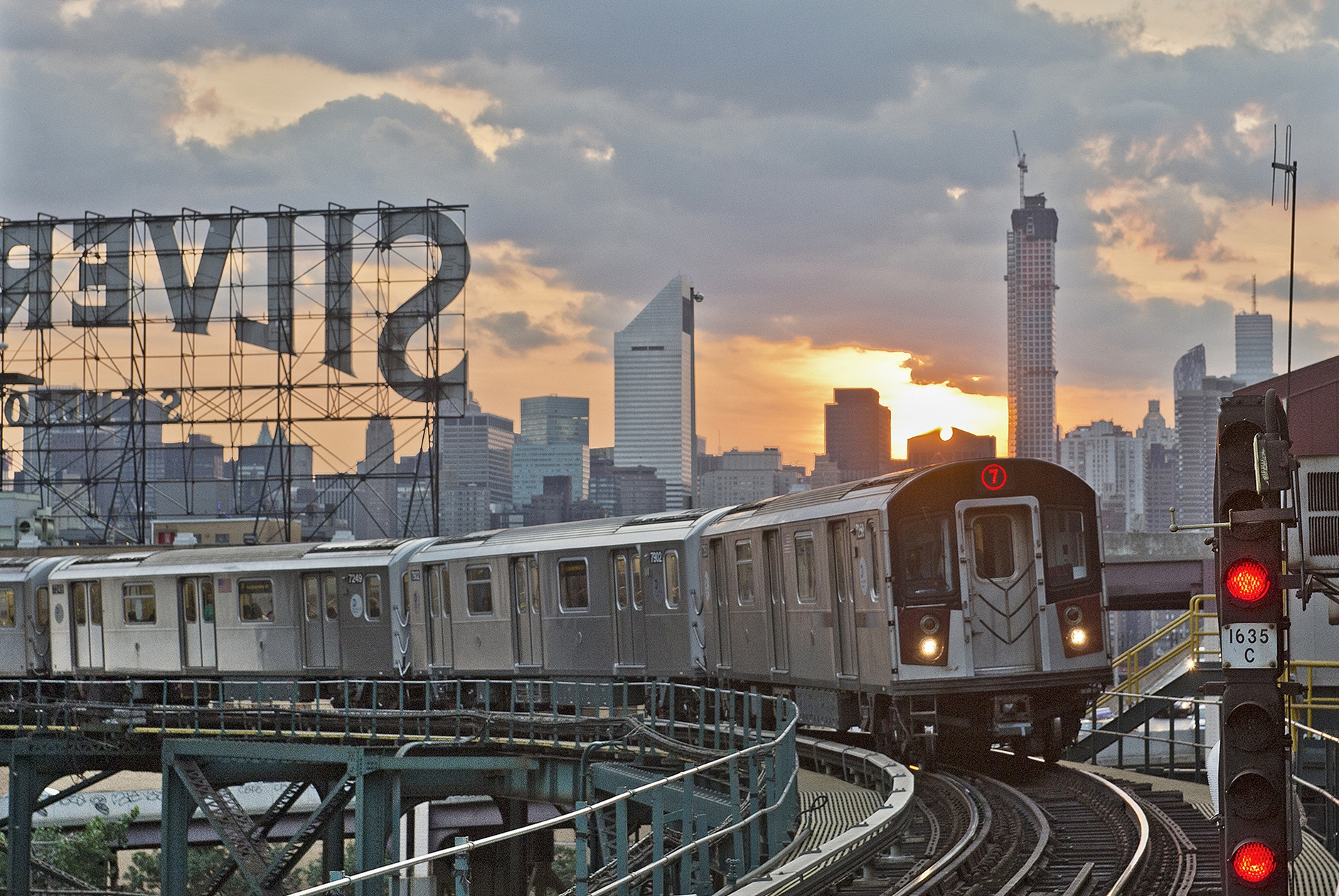
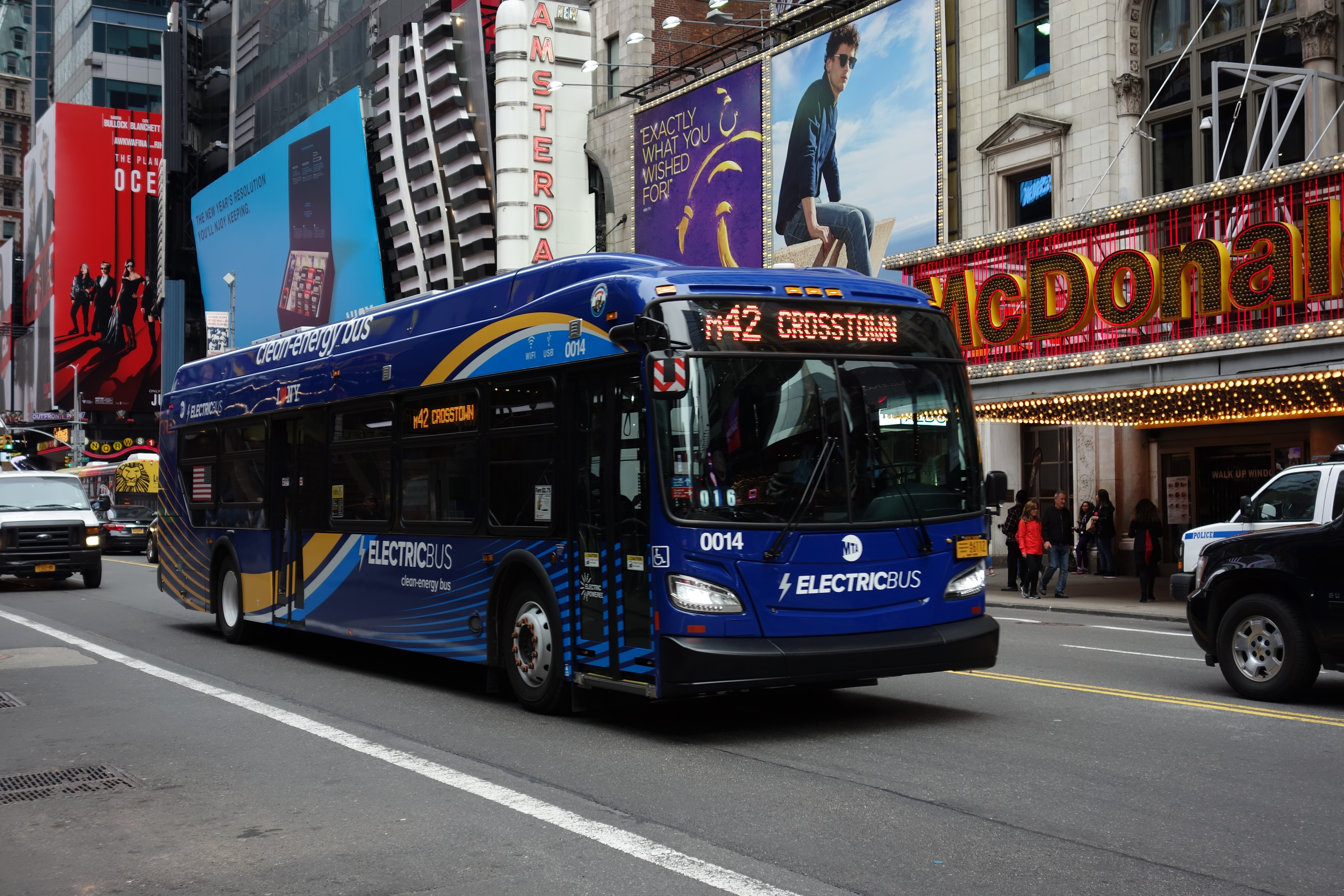
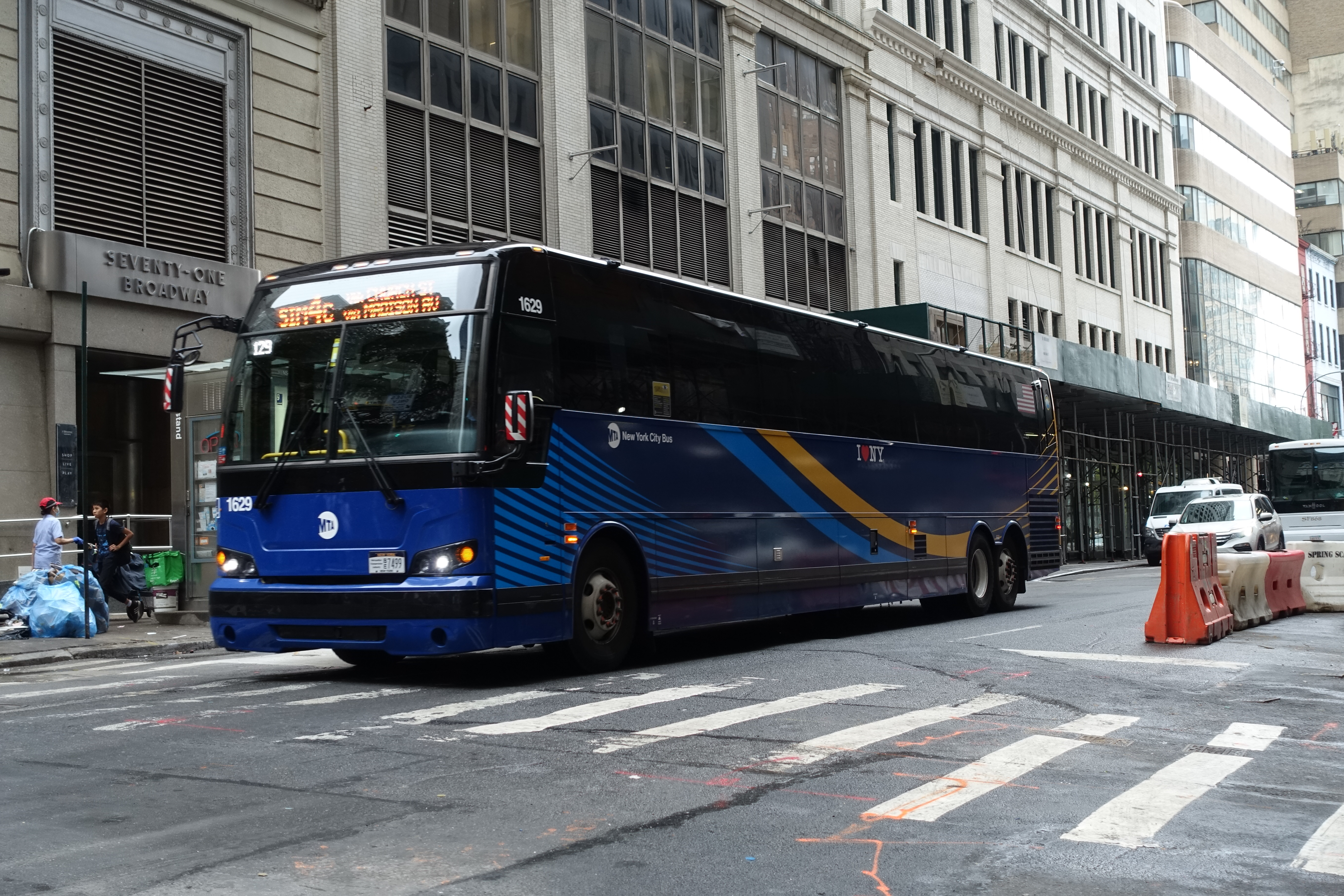
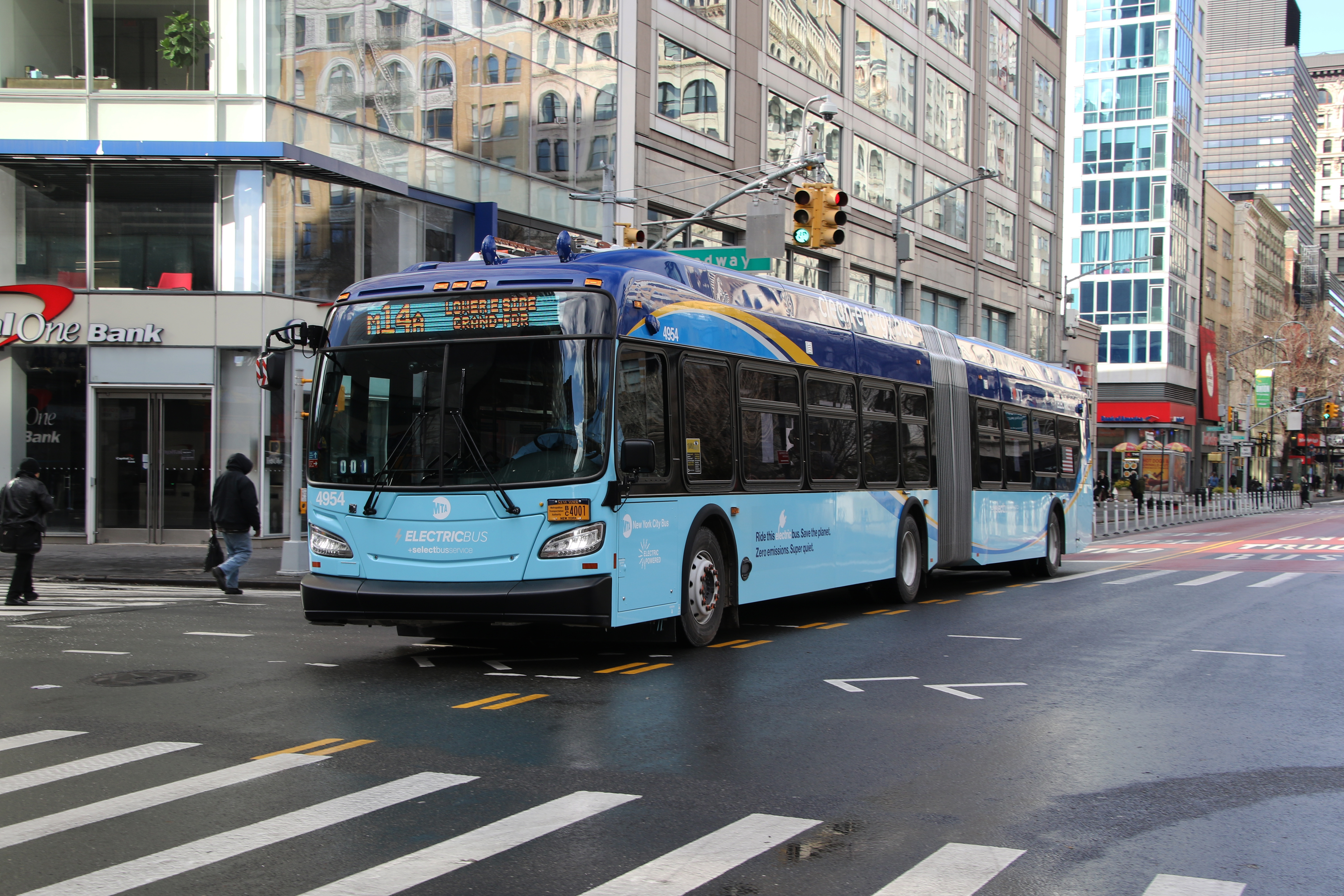
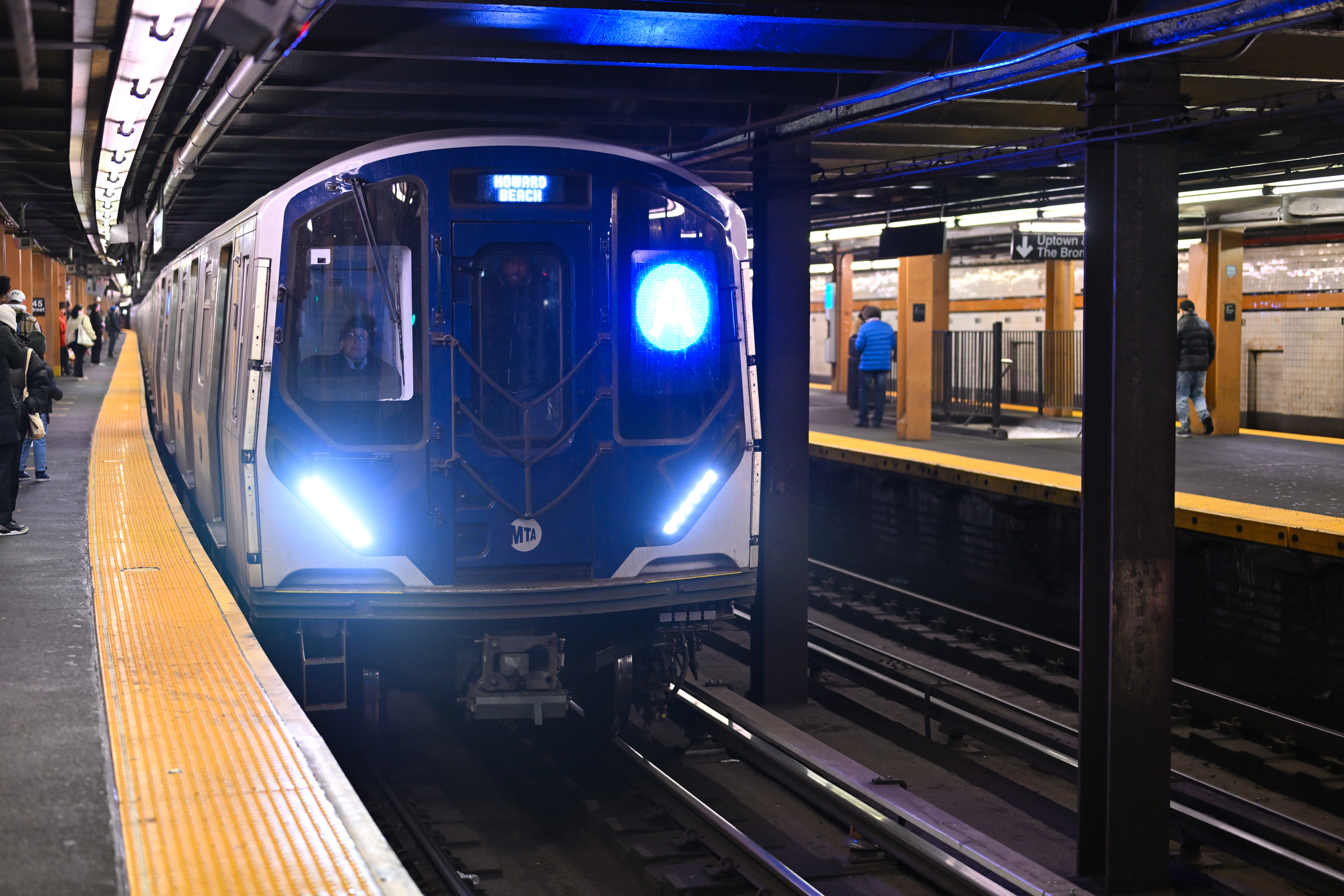
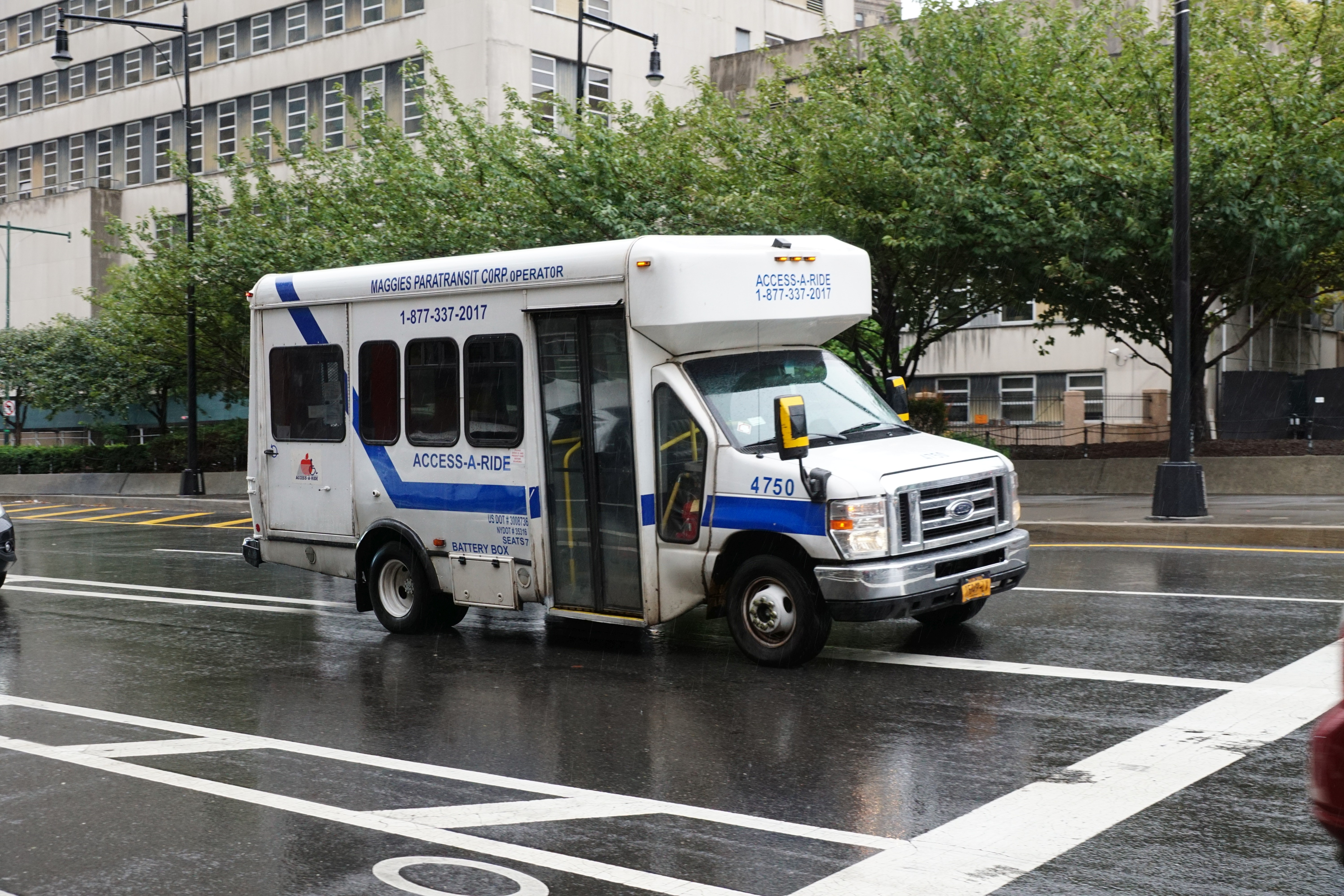
- Gallery of New York City Transit bus, subway, and paratransit services

Overview
- Owner: Metropolitan Transportation Authority (bus); City of New York (subway)
- Locale: New York City
- Transit type: Subways, Buses and BRT
- Number of lines: 235 bus; 26 rapid transit (25 subway, 1 SIR)
- Chief executive: Demetrius Crichlow
- Headquarters: 2 Broadway, Manhattan, New York City 10004 US

Operation
- Began operation: 1953
- Operators: NYCT Department of Buses (bus); NYCT Department of Subways (subway); SIRTOA (Staten Island Railway)
- Number of vehicles: 4,451 buses; 6,418 subway cars; 63 SIR cars

The New York City Transit Authority (also known as NYCTA, the TA, or simply Transit, and branded as MTA New York City Transit) is a public-benefit corporation in the U.S. state of New York that operates public transportation in New York City. Part of the Metropolitan Transportation Authority, the busiest and largest transit system in North America, the NYCTA has a daily ridership of 8 million trips (over 2.5 billion annually).

The NYCTA operates the following systems:

- New York City Subway, a rapid transit system serving Manhattan, the Bronx, Brooklyn, and Queens
- Staten Island Railway, a rapid transit line on Staten Island (operated by the subsidiary Staten Island Rapid Transit Operating Authority)
- New York City Bus, an extensive bus network serving all five boroughs (operated by the subsidiary MTA Regional Bus Operations)

== Name ==
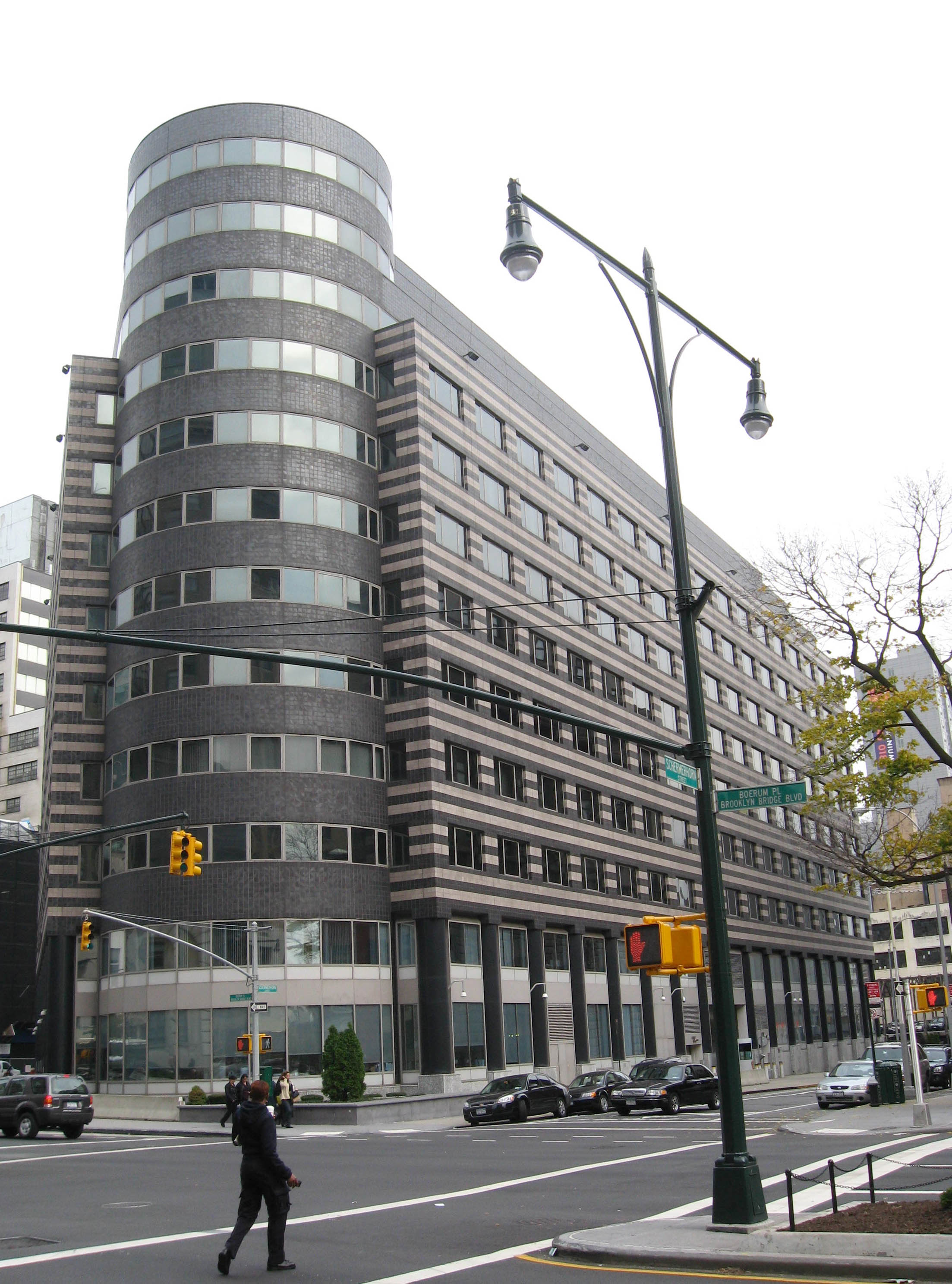
Headquarters in Brooklyn

As part of establishing a common corporate identity, the Metropolitan Transportation Authority in 1994 assigned popular names to each of its subsidiaries and affiliates. The New York City Transit Authority is now known popularly as MTA New York City Transit (NYCT), (or more specifically on the vehicles, MTA New York City Bus and MTA New York City Subway), though the former remains its legal name for documents and contracts. Newer contracts and RFPs, however, have also used the popular name. The corporation is also sometimes referred to as the TA (for Transit Authority).

== Management structure ==
The chairman and members of the MTA, by statute, also serve as the chairman and members of the Transit Authority, and serve as the directors of the Manhattan and Bronx Surface Transit Operating Authority. The executive director of the MTA is, ex officio, executive director of the Transit Authority.

The Transit Authority has its own management structure which is responsible for its day-to-day operations, with executive personnel reporting to the agency president. The position of president was vacant as of February 21, 2020, following the resignation of Andy Byford. Sarah Feinberg and Craig Cipriano served as interim presidents until May 2, 2022, when Richard A. Davey was hired to assume the role on a permanent basis. When Davey left in June 2024, Demetrius Crichlow took over as interim president; Crichlow became the official president on October 23, 2024.

== History ==
=== Background ===
1962–1968 logo

The subway system today is composed of what once were three separate systems in competition with one another. Two of them were built and operated by private companies: August Belmont's Interborough Rapid Transit Company (IRT) and the Brooklyn–Manhattan Transit Corporation (BMT). The third, the public Independent Subway System (IND) was owned and operated by the City of New York. The IRT and BMT systems were acquired by the city on June 1, 1940, for $317,000,000 and consolidated with the IND into the New York City Board of Transportation (NYCBOT).

The buses on Staten Island had been operated by a private company operating under a franchise that expired in 1946. When it became known that the company would not renew its franchise, a group of residents in the borough organized the Isle Transportation Company, to continue operation. This group ran into financial difficulties and the city took over the company on February 23, 1947. The city then controlled all of the bus routes on Staten Island. On March 30, 1947, the City took over the bus lines of the North Shore Bus Company, which comprised half of the privately owned lines in Queens, after that company went into financial troubles. On September 24, 1948, the City acquired five bus lines in Manhattan for similar reasons.

The surface operation of the BOT was a costly operation, resulting from the various equipment that was required, including trolley cars, trolley coaches, gasoline and diesel buses, of which many were obsolete and in need of replacement.

During World War II, the New York City Transit System showed an operating surplus on the five-cent fare, because gasoline was rationed and auto riders had to abandon their cars for subway and bus travel. Factories began to work around the clock, and therefore business boomed. Transit repairs were kept at a minimum as basic materials were in short supply for civilian use. Operating revenues were raised and maintenance costs were reduced, but as a result, the future problems of deferred maintenance and falling ridership were to come. In 1946, costs rose and profits turned to losses, and to obtain needed funds, the fare was raised in 1948 to ten cents on the subways and elevated, and to seven cents on the surface lines. This increase only produced a revenue surplus for a single year. In 1951 a uniform ten-cent fare was established on both the rapid transit and surface lines. Operating deficits continued to add up and public dissatisfaction with the transit system grew, as equipment was deteriorating, and train schedules being difficult to abide by.

=== Formation of the TA ===
In March 1953, the Board of Transportation was abolished, and was replaced by the New York City Transit Authority (NYCTA). The NYCTA formally succeeded the BOT on June 15, 1953, being composed of five unsalaried members. Hugh Casey was elected as the agency's chairman at the authority's first meeting. The new Transit Authority was modeled after the existing Port of New York Authority which now calls itself the Port Authority of New York and New Jersey and Triborough Bridge and Tunnel Authority, the latter of which is also now part of the MTA. At this time, the city government leased the IRT, BMT, and IND subway lines and the surface system (buses and, until 1956 street cars). A major goal of the formation of the NYCTA was to remove transit policy, and especially the setting of the transit fare, from City politics. The fare was increased to fifteen cents on July 25, 1953, and a token was introduced for paying subway and elevated fares. Bus and trolley fares continued to be paid by cash only.

In July 1953, the NYCTA proposed spending $1,065,000,000 over six years, expanding the city's subway system through new lines and connections between the IND and BMT Divisions. The most important new lines were a Second Avenue subway, including a Chrystie Street connection to the Williamsburg and Manhattan Bridge and a rebuilt DeKalb Avenue junction in Brooklyn, IRT Utica Avenue and Nostrand Avenue extensions into southeast Brooklyn, and the extension of subway service to the Rockaway Peninsula using the Long Island Railroad's Rockaway Beach Branch. Only the Chrystie Street connection, the rebuilt DeKalb Avenue Junction, and the Rockaway Line were built between 1954 and 1967.

One provision in the 1953 law that created NYCTA demanded that by July 1955, the agency create a plan to sell its bus and trolley routes to private operators. In the beginning of 1955, it was reported that the NYCTA's surface operations cost seven million dollars more to operate annually than it collected in revenue from the fare box. By privatizing the surface operations, and as a result focusing on subways, the NYCTA could then meet its operating costs. Two Manhattan private operators, New York City Omnibus and Surface Transportation, in March 1955, expressed interest in taking control of the five-route NYCTA bus operation in that borough. In the other boroughs there was no interest in taking over the routes in Brooklyn and Staten Island, and there was little interest in Queens. In April 1955, laws were passed by the New York State legislature to change the NYCTA into a three-member salaried panel to become in effect on July 1, 1955. This allowed its members to devote their full-time to managing New York's transit system. As part of this law, the provision that required surface operations to be sold was removed. The Chairman of the NYCTA then became Charles Patterson.

One major problem that the NYCTA inherited from the Board of Transportation was the age of the subway cars from the IRT and BMT. The first new cars were the R16s, totaling 200 in quantity, which first appeared in January 1955 when they were put in service on the J train. These cars were introduced with automatic thermostats and dampers to control the heat and ventilation systems based on the air temperature outside. Additional subway cars were also ordered and delivered between 1960 and 1965; the R27s, the R30s and R32s for the IND/BMT lines, and R29s, R33s and R36s for the IRT (2,350 cars). Between 1966 and 1969, an additional 1,000 cars, split between the R38, R40, and R42 orders, were placed into service. The last of the original BMT Standard stock was retired by 1969, along with the last prewar IRT equipment.

On July 5, 1966, the fare was increased to twenty cents.

As with all mass transit in the United States the TA requires assistance for its capital costs and to cover operational needs, however, the very high ridership of New York City's subway system has enabled it to pay 67 percent of its operating costs from fares and advertising. Historically, the TA's capital requirements were met by the city and state jointly, but this support was withdrawn, primarily by Governor Rockefeller, in the 1960s.

In 1965, mayoral candidate John Lindsay pledged to use the toll revenues from the Triborough Bridge and Tunnel Authority (TBTA) to offset the NYCTA's deficits. In January 1966, New York State, with the help of Governor Nelson Rockefeller, purchased the Long Island Rail Road from its corporate parent, the Pennsylvania Railroad, and it became part of the Metropolitan Commuter Transportation Authority (MCTA). Rockefeller saw the difficulty that John Lindsay, who had since won the mayoral election, had in his plan to use the TBTA surpluses for the NYCTA, and decided to expand the MCTA to give it oversight to the NYCTA and the TBTA. The MCTA would be renamed the Metropolitan Transportation Authority (MTA). Tied to a bill with the creation of the MTA was a $2.5 billion bond issue that would be approved or disapproved by voters in November 1967. A majority of the bonds would go to the state's mass transit systems, with a majority going to New York City, and to Nassau, Suffolk, Westchester, Putnam, Dutchess, Rockland, and Orange Counties. The day prior to the election, two brand new R40 cars were displayed on the IND Sixth Avenue Line at Herald Square. The bond issue passed, and the MTA was set to take over the NYCTA in 1968. The night before December 31, 1967, the NYCTA and the TWU made an agreement to avoid a strike. The deal gave NYCTA workers the ability to retire with about half-pay after twenty years if the employee was over fifty years old. This would later cause problems, as large numbers of transit workers would retire to take advantage of these benefits. On March 1, 1968, the NYCTA, and its subsidiary, the Manhattan and Bronx Surface Transit Operating Authority (MaBSTOA), were placed under the control of, and are now affiliates of the Metropolitan Transportation Authority (MTA).

=== 2017–2021: transit crisis ===
In 2017, New York governor Andrew Cuomo declared a state of emergency for the MTA due to various incidents involving the NYCTA's subway and bus systems. At the time, only 65 percent of weekday trains reached their destinations on time, the lowest rate since a transit crisis in the 1970s. To a lesser extent, New York City buses operated by the MTA were also affected. To resolve these issues, a "Subway Action Plan" was revealed, as well as a "Bus Action Plan".

=== COVID-19 pandemic ===
Beginning March 25, 2020, service on buses and subways was reduced due to decreased ridership during the first wave of the COVID-19 pandemic in New York City. In late March, NYCTA interim president Sarah Feinberg stated that a shutdown "feels misguided to me" and was "not on the table". Feinberg also spoke in favor of hazard pay for front-line workers. In April 2020, four City Council members requested that subway service be temporarily suspended due to the spread of COVID-19 in the subway system. Also that April, Feinberg called the MTA "the most aggressive transit agency in the country in acting quickly and decisively to protect our workforce". By April 22, 2020, COVID-19 had killed 83 agency employees; the agency announced that their families would be eligible for $500,000 in death benefits. Over 100 employees had died of COVID-19 as of June 2020.

Starting in May 2020, stations were closed overnight for cleaning; the overnight closures were announced as a temporary measure that would be ended once the pandemic was over. Trains and stations were cleaned more than usual. 24-hour subway service was restored on May 17, 2021.

== Presidents ==
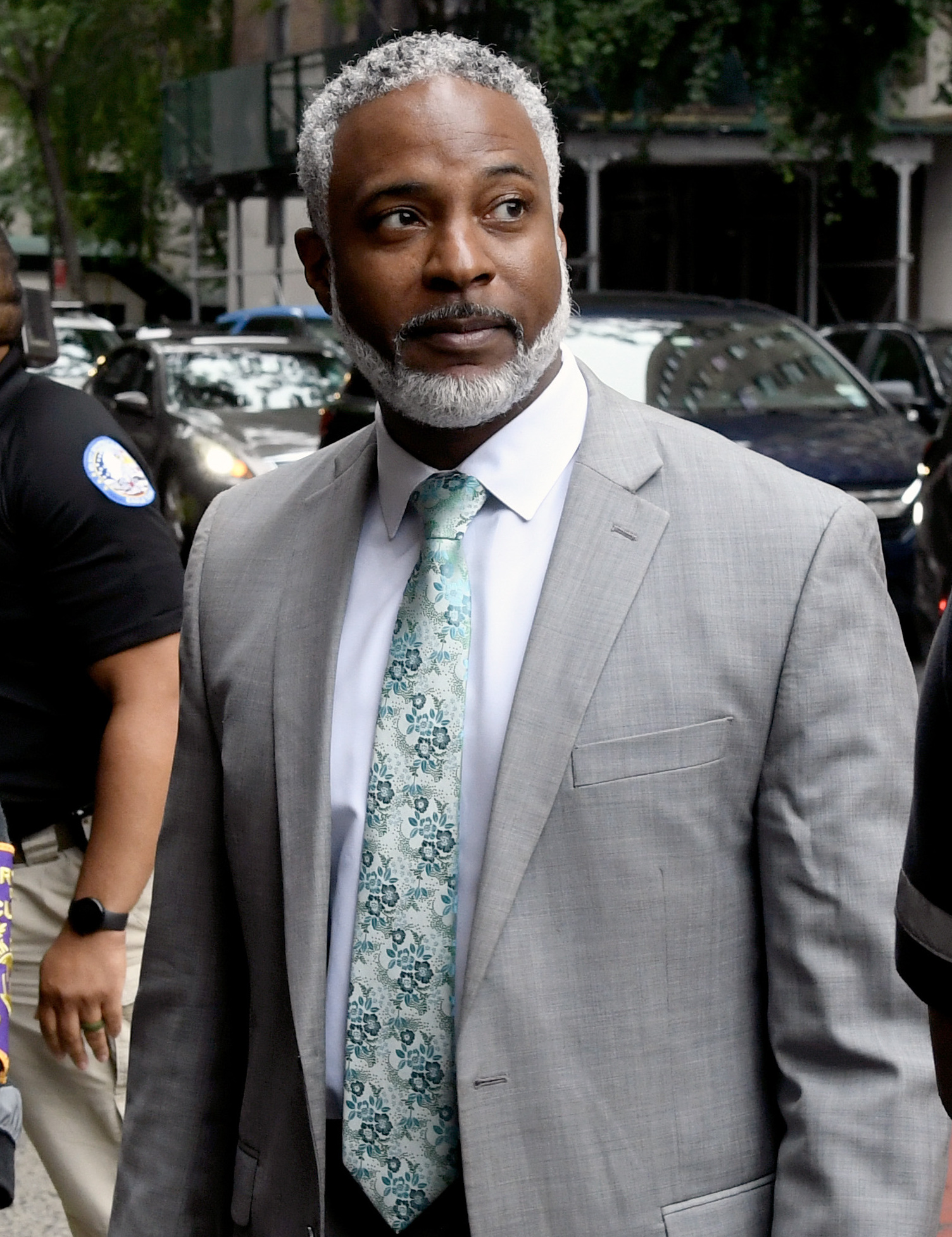
NYCT president Demetrius Crichlow

NYCTA presidents (1973–present)
John G. DeRoos	1973–1979
John D. Simpson	1979–1984
David L. Gunn	1984–1990
Alan F. Kiepper	1990–1996
Lawrence G. Reuter	1996–2007
Howard Roberts	2007–2009
Thomas Prendergast	2009–2013
Carmen Bianco	2013–2015
Veronique "Ronnie" Hakim	2016–2017
Phillip Eng (interim)	2017–2018
Andy Byford	2018–2020
Sarah Feinberg (interim)	2020–2021
Craig Cipriano (interim)	2021–2022
Richard A. Davey	2022–2024
Demetrius Crichlow	Since 2024

== Strikes ==
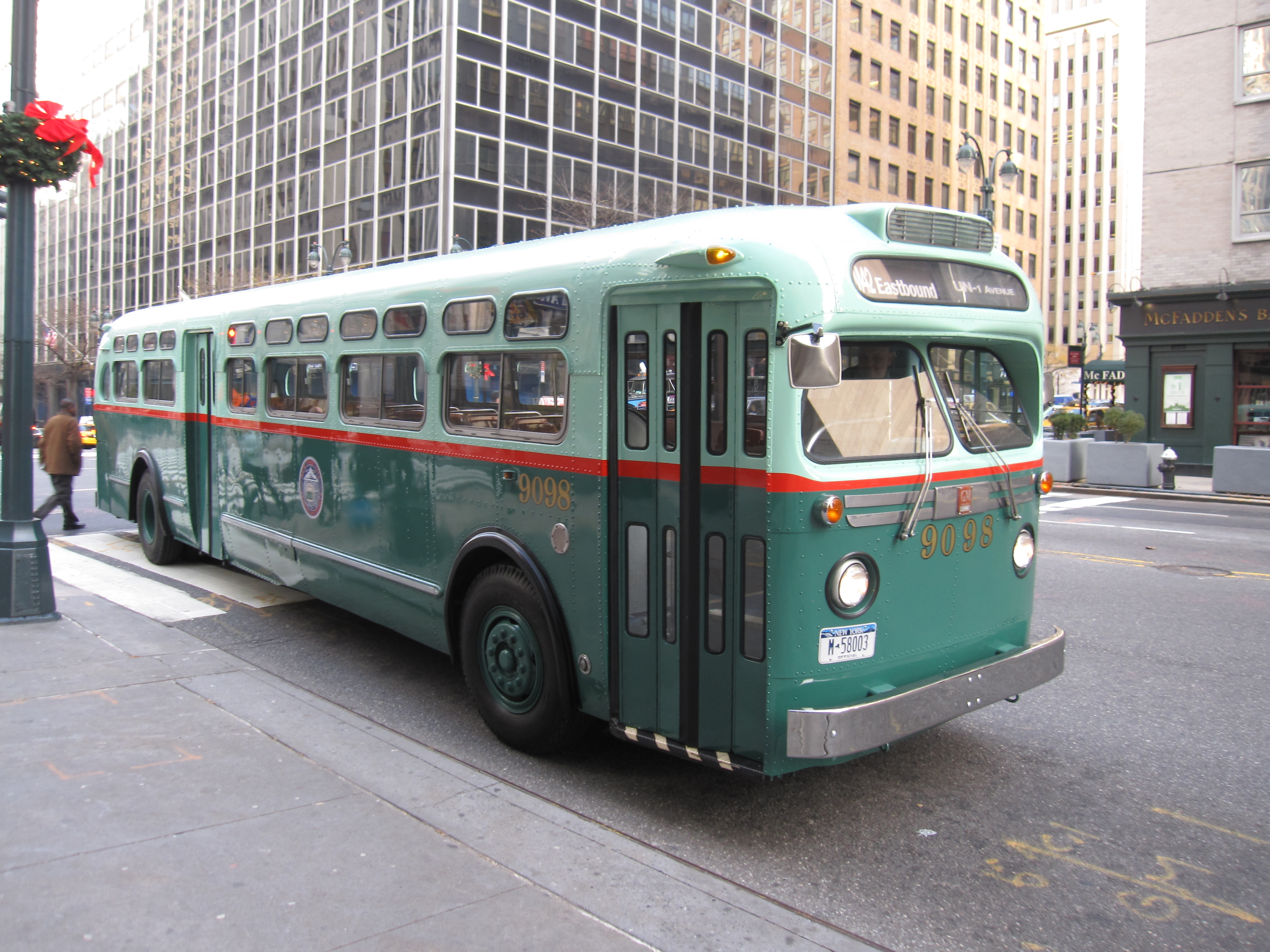
The original livery for NYC Transit Authority buses in the 1950s.

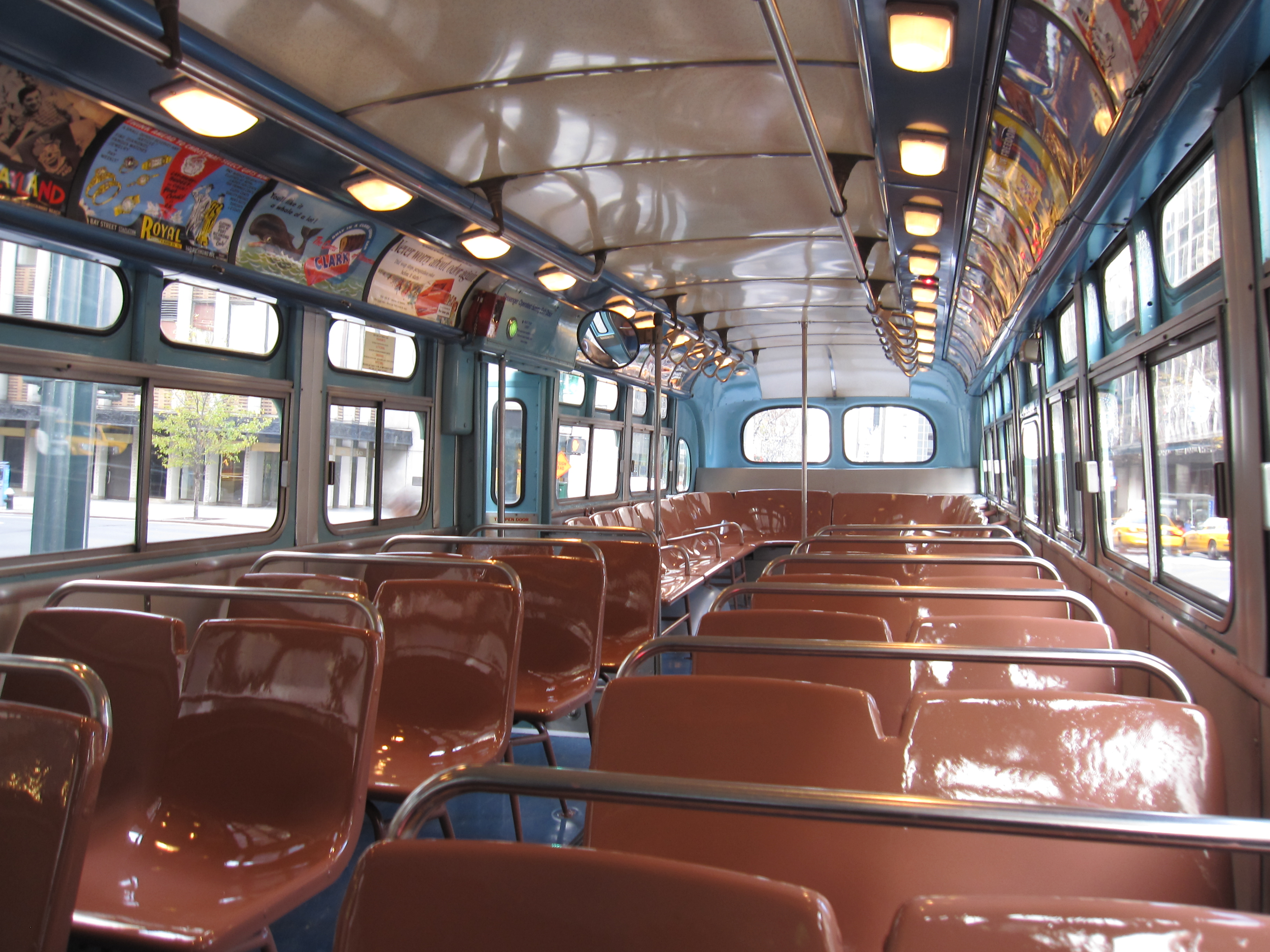
Interior view of one of the buses from 1958

Employees of the New York City Transit Authority assigned to the New York City Subway and in Brooklyn, Manhattan, and the Bronx are members of the Transport Workers Union of America Local 100, with Queens and Staten Island bus personnel represented by various Amalgamated Transit Union locals.

In 1949, the Transport Workers Union and the Board of Transportation, under Mayor Willian O'Dwyer signed a Memorandum of Understanding that gave the right to represent all of the system's workers to the TWU. In 1954 an NYCTA-wide representation election took place. It gave TWU exclusive collective bargaining rights for all hourly workers for the NYCTA, except for those in the Queens and Staten Island Bus Divisions, which remained a part of the Amalgamated Association of Street Electric Railway and Motor Coach Employees of America, which became the Amalgamated Transit Union in 1964. After looking at the Brotherhood of Locomotive Engineers as their model, NYCTA motorman formed their own union in 1954, a Motormen's Benevolent Association (MBA) to further their interests. In 1956 they went on strike on a hot June day, tying up service on the BMT Division. Its president, Theodore Loos, and its leadership were fired after the strike, but were reinstated after agreeing not to strike again.

On December 16, 1957, another representation election for the TWU was scheduled, and the motormen from the MBA did not want to have a small role in the TWU, and threatened to strike, but were stopped by court injunctions. As a result, the motormen wanted to hold an election for the representation of their craft independent of the NYCTA-wide elections. The management of the NYCTA did not recognize the MBA as a bargaining unit as the TWU officially represented the motormen. A request for a separate election was denied, and as a result the motormen wanted to show their power and to acquire their own representation. As a result, on December 9, 1957, the motormen went on strike, resulting in subway service being reduced in half for eight days. Riders using the IND lines in Queens, the Bronx, and Upper Manhattan, and the southern Brooklyn lines of the BMT were the hardest hit. The leaders of the MBA were punished after going against injunctions prohibiting strikes. Afterwards, the MBA leaders were punished, and on the first morning of the strike, the MBA president Theodore Loos and three other MBA officials were arrested and sent to jail. While they were in jail, MBA executive secretary Frank Zelano was acting head of the MBA and bargained on their behalf. In 1958, the TWU and the MBA reached a settlement. The motormen became a separate United Motormen's Division within the TWU and benefitted from a fund for skilled craft workers. Theodore Loos became its head.

On New Year's Day, in 1966, a 12-day strike was started with the aid of Mike Quill. This strike started after the union member's contracts had expired, and with large economic demands from the union. After the 1966 New York City transit strike, the Taylor Law was passed making public employee strikes illegal in the state of New York.

Despite the Taylor Law, there was still an 11-day strike in 1980. Thirty-four thousand union members struck in order to call for increased wages.

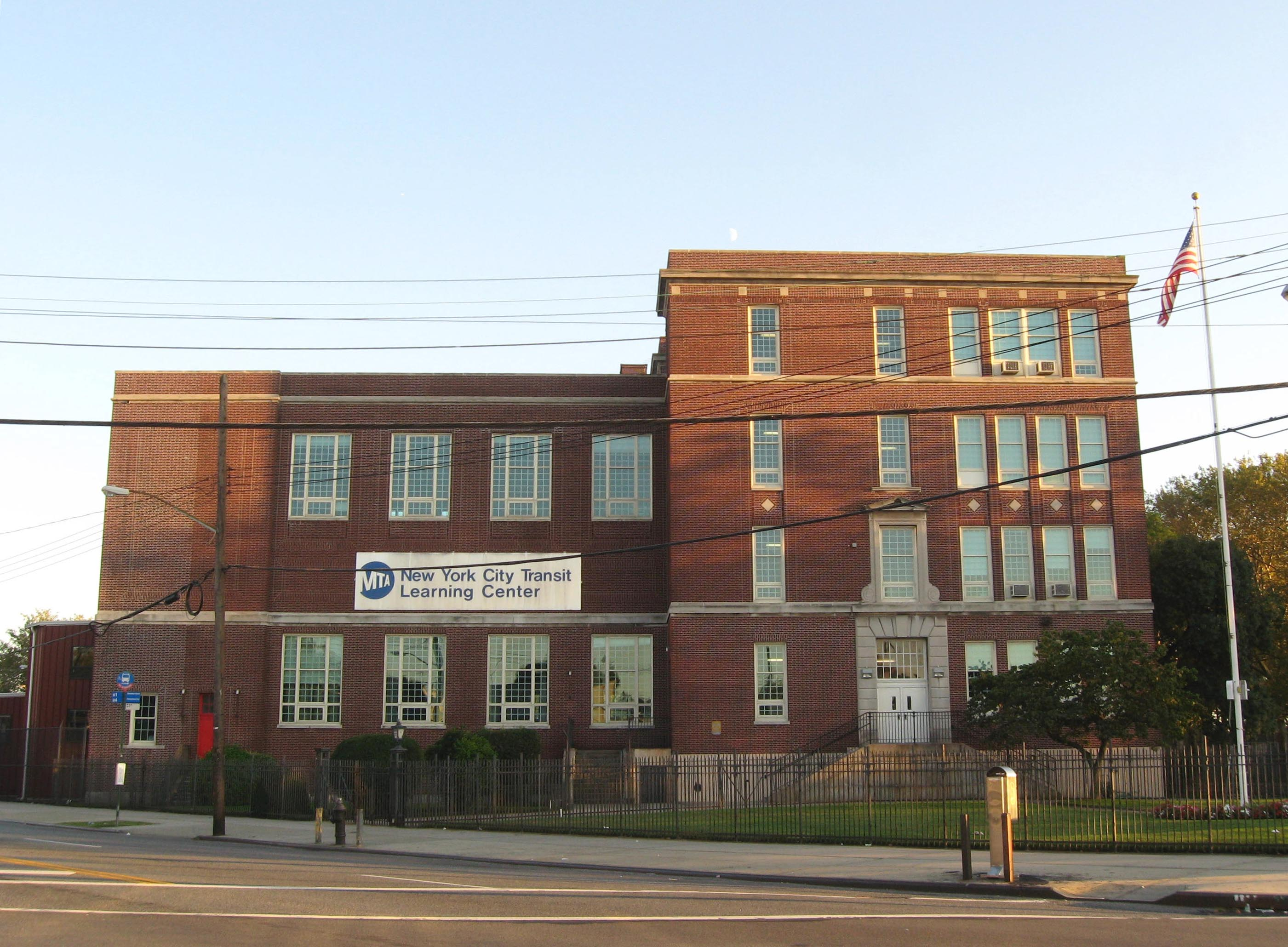
New York City Transit Learning Center, Brooklyn

On December 20, 2005, another strike occurred. Workers walked off at 3 a.m. and the NYCTA stopped operating. Later that day, State Supreme Court Justice Theodore Jones warned the transit union that there would be a fine of $1 million for each day the TA is shut down. Also for each day the workers missed during the strike they would be fined two days' pay. Ultimately, the Judge fined the union $2.5 million, charged employees two days' wages for every day they were out on strike, and imposed individual fines on the union's officers. Most significantly, the courts indefinitely suspended the Union's dues checkoff and refused to restore it for nearly 18 months. The strike was over by December 23, after several contract negotiations; the original contract, agreed to by Local 100 and the Transit Authority as a result of the strike, was ultimately imposed on both parties by an arbitrator. More than four months after the strike ended, the courts imposed a brief jail term on Local 100 president Roger Toussaint for his role in the strike.

In 2008–09, MTA management once again refused to sign off on an agreement with Local 100 for a successor to the collective bargaining agreement, which expired early in 2009. This time, the Union chose to pursue the arbitration process provided by the Taylor Law rather than strike in support of its demands. On August 11, 2009, after months of community meetings and dozens of witnesses, the state arbitration panel issued its award. However, the MTA refused to comply with the award, forcing the Union to go to court to seek to enforce it. On December 11, 2009, State Supreme Court Justice Peter Sherwood issued a decision upholding the arbitration award in all respects. The MTA had not indicated whether it appealed this decision.

== TripPlanner ==
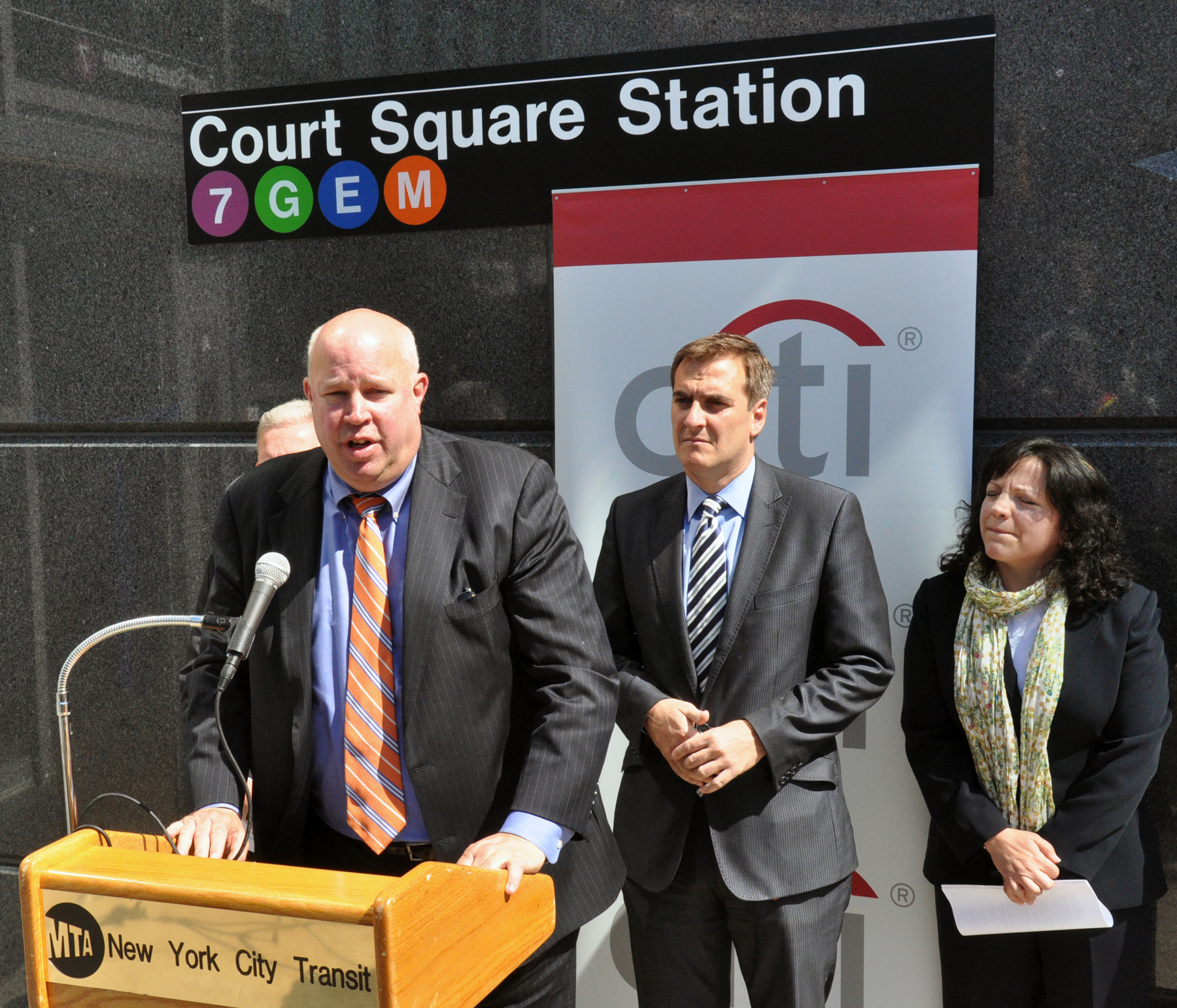
NYCT president and MTA chairman & CEO Thomas F. Prendergast (left) at the opening of the Court Square subway complex in 2011

The first New York area trip planner, called Trips123.com, operated by New Jersey–based Transcom, combined buses, subways and commuter trains operated by 18 transit agencies – including the Metropolitan Transportation Authority, New Jersey Transit and Port Authority – to give riders directions to various destinations.

The $20-million project was in the works for more than two years and was tested in 2004 inside the MTA's Madison Avenue headquarters.

In December 2006, MTA New York City Transit launched TripPlanner, its online travel itinerary service. TripPlanner offers users customized subway, bus, and walking directions within all five boroughs of New York City, as well as service alerts and service advisories for planned track work. The service was developed and is maintained by NYC Transit and its outside vendor, Trapeze Group. It is accessed through the MTA website.

TripPlanner provides search fields for starting address and destination address and allows end users to navigate the complexity of the subway and bus system by narrowing their options to subway, local bus or express bus only, minimizing the number of transfers or time, and adjusting the walking distance to and from the transit stop.

In October 2007, NYCT launched TripPlanner On the Go! This service allows users with mobile access to the web to obtain travel itineraries while away from a desk or laptop computer. TripPlanner On the Go! was made applicable for cellular phone, PDA, or Blackberry users, and offered the same three-option travel directions along with real-time service alerts. The back-end programming for On the Go! was "developed using XHTML technology and the latest Microsoft Dot Net Framework in a clustered environment". By the end of October 2007, more than 5,000 daily customers were using TripPlanner.

In February 2008, NYCT announced an upgrade to the mapping system using NAVTEQ and Microsoft Virtual Earth software similar to mapping sites such as Google Maps and MapQuest. The new software offered more accurate street grids, included business and points of interest, and allowed users to view the maps in aerial, and 3D points of view. To date, the aerial and 3D views are not available on TripPlanner's mobile service.

In June 2008, NYCT announced it had reached 10,000 daily visitors to TripPlanner. Since the announcement, the number of visits to the service eclipsed the number of telephone calls to the agency's travel information hotline. The following month, Trip Planner launched as a widget application, allowing users to add it to their personalized homepage, blog, or website.

The Trip Planner has since largely replaced the NYCTA call center on NYC Transit's phone number.

== Fare collection ==
In November 1993, a fare system called the MetroCard was introduced, which allowed riders to use cards that have stored value to pay fares equal to the amount paid at a subway station booth or vending machine. Designed and initially operated by Cubic Transportation Systems, the MetroCard was enhanced in 1997 to allow passengers to make free transfers between subways and buses within two hours; several MetroCard-only transfers between subway stations were added in 2001. With the addition of unlimited-ride MetroCards in 1998, the New York City Transit system was the last major transit system in the United States, with the exception of BART in San Francisco, to introduce passes for unlimited bus and rapid transit travel. Unlimited-ride MetroCards are available for 7-day and 30-day periods. One-day "Fun Pass" and 14-day cards were also introduced but have since been discontinued.

In April 2016, MTA solicited proposals for a contactless "New Fare Payment System" to replace the MetroCard by 2022. On October 23, 2017, it was announced that the MetroCard would be phased out and replaced by OMNY, a contactless fare payment system also made by Cubic, with fare payment being made using Apple Pay, Google Pay, debit/credit cards with near-field communication technology, or radio-frequency identification cards. The announcement calls for the expansion of this system to a general-use electronic fare payment system at 500 subway turnstiles and on 600 buses by late 2018, with all buses and subway stations using electronic fare collection by 2020. However, support for the MetroCard is slated to remain in place until April 2024. From August 2023 to January 2026, the fare for a subway or local bus ride is $2.90, while the fare for an express bus ride is $7.00. As of January 2026, the fare for a subway or local bus ride is $3.00, while the fare for an express bus ride is $7.25. In addition, MetroCard sales have ended on December 31, 2025, in favor of the new OMNY system.

== See also ==
- Transportation in New York City
- History of transportation in New York City
- New York City transit fares
- MetroCard
- Service animal policy of MTA
