= 1966 New York City transit strike =

NYC transit workers strike
- Date: January 1–13, 1966
- Location: New York City

Parties
Transport Workers Union of America Amalgamated Transit Union	New York City Transit Authority

Number
33,000 transit workers	

In 1966, the Transport Workers Union of America (TWU) and Amalgamated Transit Union (ATU) called a strike action in New York City after the expiration of their contract with the New York City Transit Authority (TA). It was the first strike against the TA; pre-TWU transit strikes in 1905, 1910, 1916, and 1919 against the then-private transit companies had all failed. There had also been some partial TWU strikes in the 1930s but no citywide actions. The strike led to the passage of the Taylor Law, which redefined the rights and limitations of unions for public employees in New York.

The strikers were led initially led by Mike Quill, the TWU's founder, who had been the union's president since its founding. The strike effectively ended all service on the subway and buses in the city, affecting millions of commuters. It was an ominous beginning for the mayoralty of John V. Lindsay, but is perhaps better remembered for the jailing of Quill and for his death only weeks afterwards.

== Context ==
Democratic Party New York City mayor Robert F. Wagner Jr. granted collective bargaining rights to city employees in 1958. This led to the unions replacing Tammany Hall as the city's most powerful political force. Wagner formed a close alliance with the public-sector unions. John Lindsay, a reformist within the Republican Party, won the 1965 New York City mayoral election by campaigning against the city's often corrupt political machines. With the transit contract set to expire the same day Lindsay would take office, the stage was set for confrontation.

The 1966 strike was led by Mike Quill. Quill was born in Ireland in 1905, to a family heavily associated with the progressive republican movement. His father was so prominent in the movement that republican leaders often consulted with him. Quill later relocated to New York in 1926. His progressive values and ties to the republican party caused turmoil when seeking employment. Despite his trouble in this area he eventually found his place getting involved in activist groups such as the Clan na Gael. His involvement in groups like this radicalized his already progressive ideas. In time he became known for his ability to critique those in power and his belligerent approach to organizing. Due to these traits he finally found his place in founding and leading the Transit Workers Union."

Lindsay's "Protestant rectitude" proved no match for the "fiery" Quill. The true sources of power in New York became clear, a point that would be further driven home by 1967 and 1968 teachers strikes and a 1968 strike by sanitation workers. By the time Lindsay ran for re-election in 1969 as the candidate of the Liberal Party of New York, he had made his peace with the public sector unions, and ultimately won their support. However, and partly as a result, the city's social and economic decline was rapidly intensifying.

The proposition of a strike, especially on a day like New Years, was unwanted by officials. The day of Mayor Lindsay’s inauguration State Supreme Court justice George Tilzer issued an attempt to prohibit the strike from taking place. He stated in his ruling, “the staggering effects of a strike at this time of the inhabitants of this city far outweigh the rights of these defendants.” The counsel of the TA even stated the strike would be “illegal and cause irrevocable damage to the city” It’s safe to say that even the prospect of a strike led by someone as zealous as Mike Quill was unfavorable.

This injunction and bids to call off the strike meant nothing to the eager Mike Quill. He refused to take any offers the mayor and TA officials threw at him. Mayor Lindsay dreaded what a major strike would do to him in his early days of office. He was trying everything to get Quill to call off the strike. In response during a meeting with his bargaining committee, Quill stated to the mayor “You are nothing but a juvenile, a lightweight, and a pipsqueak. You don't know anything about the working class. You don't know anything about labor unions.”

The TWU felt Lindsay did not care about blue collar workers and held a very belittling attitude towards members of the union. Hours before the strike began Quill and Lindsay held one final negotiation meeting. During this Linday's attempted to stop the strike with a large financial package. During the meeting he lectured Quill rather trying to convince him to take the deal. Lindsay felt he was doing the working class a favor and neglected to make any strong bargaining attempts. Leaving this meeting, in front of several reporters, Quill stated the strike was on and tore up a legal document calling for a stop to the strike. With that the 1966 New York Transit strike was set to take place on New Year's Day.

== Duration of Strike ==
The twelve-day strike began on New Year's Day; the last trains rolled at 8:02 am. The TWU demands consisted of a 30 percent raise, a 32 hour, 4 day week, retirement at half pay after 25 years, and better pension benefits. An injunction to end the strike was issued later that day, under the 1947 Condon-Wadlin Act.[3] On January 2, the union reduced its economic demands, but the TA responded only by getting a judge's order for the arrest of Quill and eight other union leaders. (The others were Matthew Guinan, Frank Sheehan, Daniel Gilmartin, Ellis Van Riper, and Mark Kavanagh of the TWU and John Rowland, William Mangus, and Frank Kleess of the ATU).

The arrests were set for 1 a.m. on January 4. The TWU was not going to back down after this, with their leader Mike Quill stating before the strike, “this is war.” Throughout the strike this same mindset was unwavering for him, despite being in poor health and wanted for jail. Immediately before his arrest he told reporters at the Americana Hotel "The judge can drop dead in his black robes. I don't care if I rot in jail. I will not call off the strike.’”

Quill spent little time in jail: his poor health soon had him transferred to Bellevue Hospital and later to Mount Sinai Medical Hospital, leaving TWU Secretary-Treasurer Doug MacMahon (a close associate of Quill's, with him since the union's founding) to lead the strike. On January 10, 15,000 workers picketed City Hall.

The mediation team met on January 12 at the Americana hotel to share their proposal for terms to end the strike. Negotiations moved forward through mediators, with movement from both sides. At 1:37 A.M. on January 13, Douglas MacMahon or the TWU's chief negotiator announced that the union was recommending settlement based on the mediators' proposals. He states during this speech, "I am very happy to make this announcement. The union feels that this is a substantial victory."

The package, worth over $60 million, included wages increases from $3.18 to $4.14 an hour, an additional paid holiday, increased pension benefits, and other gains. Gains averaged nine percent for the next eight years. Quill's health at first seemed to be improving; he was actually released from hospital January 25. He gave a speech to the victorious strikers and another press conference at the Americana, but the apparent improvement in his health was an illusion: he died on January 28.

== After the Strike ==
By 12:45 p.m. on January 13, the New York City transit system was up and running. The first train ran at 9:32 with its first paying customers since the strike. Residents were so glad they had their transit back. It was noted the subway lacked the usual chaos and fighting, with riders appearing extra civil. This speedy return to normalcy, happened less than seven hours after the negotiations were finalized. The reason for such a quick restoration was due to a plan that was created by the MTA during the strike to allow a swift return to business.

== See also ==
- 1980 New York City transit strike
- 2005 New York City transit strike
