= Taylor Law =

Public Employees Fair Employment Act in New York State, USA

The Public Employees Fair Employment Act, more commonly known as the Taylor Law, is Article 14 of the state Civil Service Law (of the Consolidated Laws), which defines the rights and limitations of unions for public employees in New York.

The Public Employees Fair Employment Act (the Taylor Law) is a New York State statute, named after labor researcher George W. Taylor. It authorizes a governor-appointed State Public Employment Relations Board to resolve contract disputes for public employees while curtailing their right to strike.

The law provides for mediation and binding arbitration to give voice to unions, but work stoppages are made punishable with fines and jail time. The United Federation of Teachers and the Uniformed Sanitationmen's Association challenged the Taylor Law at its inception in 1967. Following a 2005 strike, Transit Workers' president Roger Toussaint was incarcerated for three days under a Taylor Law ruling.

== Details ==
The Taylor Law grants public employees the right to organize and elect their union representatives. It defines the boundaries for public employers in negotiating and entering into agreements with public unions. The law also defines the terms for the foundation of the Public Employment Relations Board, a state agency that administers the law in matters related to public strike negotiation. The board consists of three members appointed by the governor. Each member must be approved by the senate, and only two may be of the same political party.

One of the most controversial parts of the Taylor Law is Section 210, which prohibits New York state public employees from striking. For certain unions, primarily law enforcement, it provides for compelling binding PERB arbitration in the event of an impasse in negotiations. For all others, except for law enforcement unions, it provides for non-binding "fact-finding," in which a panel of arbitrators make a recommendation to the parties on what is considered a fair settlement of the dispute.

The penalties for striking is an additional day of pay for each day of a strike, totaling two days' loss for each strike day, removal of the "dues check-off", and imprisonment of the union's president.

The law does not apply to Long Island Rail Road, Metro-North Railroad and Staten Island Railway employees, who are subjected to the jurisdiction of the federal Railway Labor Act of 1926.

== History ==
The law was put into effect in 1967, following costly transit strikes the previous year and is named for George W. Taylor, chairman of the commission appointed by NY Governor Nelson Rockefeller to propose amendments to the 1947 Condon–Wadlin Act.

Taylor was a professor of industrial research at the University of Pennsylvania's Wharton School for forty years before his death in 1972. He served as an advisor on labor relations issues to U.S. presidents Roosevelt, Truman, Eisenhower, Kennedy and Johnson. Taylor was a strong supporter of the strike in private sector bargaining.

Since its passage, the Taylor Law has been cited in preventing public employee strikes. However, public employees have struck since the introduction of the law:

The United Federation of Teachers struck the New York City schools in 1968, for which Albert Shanker and other union leaders were jailed for two weeks the following year. Teachers struck the city again for five days over the issue of class size in 1975.

The fine was applied during the New York City Transit Authority 1980 transit strike and again in the 2005 transit strike. The latter involved the Transit Authority and also MTA Bus Company workers who were members of Transport Workers Union (TWU) Local 100.

During the 2005 transit strike, both the strikers and the MTA violated portions of the Taylor Law. Section 210 states that the workers are not allowed to strike; Section 201, Part 4, states that employers are not allowed to negotiate benefits provided by a public retirement fund or payment to a fund or insurer to provide an income for retirees.

In addition, in the wake of the 2005 strike, the New York State Supreme Court in Kings County (Brooklyn), declared TWU Local 100 in violation of the Taylor Law, and issued a fine of $1,000,000 per day, pursuant with the guidelines set forth in the law. Two smaller unions also representing NYC Transit Authority workers, Amalgamated Transit Union Locals 726 and 1056, were fined smaller amounts.

The Buffalo Teachers Federation struck in September 2000, which delayed the start of the school year.

Corrections officers at state prisons have struck twice, in 1979 and in 2025.

== Criticism and reform ==
While government officials support the Taylor Law as a way of preventing strikes by municipal unions in New York, the unions contend that the law is harsh on them. The labor unions also contend that the Taylor Law does not provide government agencies the incentive to negotiate contracts on a timely basis and negotiate the terms of the contract in good faith. There have been lobbying efforts by municipal unions to the New York state legislature to change the Taylor Law, but there is some resistance or reluctance to modifying the law.

With the creation and assistance of the Taylor Law, members of many organizations including the Albany, New York, Fire Department were able to unionize, becoming one of the strongest political organizations. In 1970 was the birth of Union Local 2007, which was also responsible in paving the way for all other public sector unions in Albany, New York.

The Taylor Law has been a frequent target for upstate New York anti-union activists; they claim that it severely limits the ability of governments to limit spending on unionized labor, with minimal recourse in the event the unions illegally strike.

One particular clause, the Triborough Amendment, mandates that in the event of a lack of a contract, the terms of the previous contract continue indefinitely. This amendment protects workers when contracts expire before an agreement is reached, as otherwise, governments could simply wait until contracts expire, and then unilaterally alter the terms. The Conservative Party of New York State, which seeks the abolition of the amendment, argues that the amendment's guarantee of a perpetual contract eliminates any incentive for unions to negotiate in good faith.

Others have made the argument that while there is no corollary to the Triborough Amendment under the National Labor Relations Act, which governs private sector workers, those workers may strike at impasse. Some unions believe it would be fundamentally unfair to eliminate the Triborough Amendment but at the same time continuing the Taylor Law's prohibition against strikes. To do so would provide no incentive for management to negotiate a fair contract since it could always just change the contract as it saw fit after reaching impasse, leaving the workers and unions with no legal recourse. That would be completely unprecedented in American labor law.
