= 1980 New York City transit strike =

Labor dispute

A 1980 transit strike in New York City halted service on the New York City Transit Authority (a subsidiary of the Metropolitan Transportation Authority) for the first time since 1966. Around 33,000 members of Transport Workers Union (TWU) Local 100 walked off their jobs on April 1, 1980, in a strike with the goal of increasing the wage for contracted workers. All subway and bus lines in the five boroughs of New York City were brought to a complete standstill for twelve days. The strike was resolved on April 11.

== History ==
The transit workers' contract was up for renewal in April 1980. Negotiations began on February 4, with the TWU initially demanding a 21-month contract with a 30% wage increase; they justified the hike by claiming that the cost of living had gone up 53% since the last contract negotiation, and their contract did not account for changes in the cost of living. The negotiations were extremely confrontational. The MTA got a court writ prohibiting the workers from striking, but the TWU announced their intention to violate the writ should the negotiations fail. The MTA responded on March 31 with a proposal of a 34-month contract with a 3% wage increase each year. Negotiations failed early the next morning, and 33,000 workers walked off their jobs.

In response, the city implemented drastic plans to curb urban traffic. Most significant was a mandatory carpool restriction, in which cars were not allowed to enter the Manhattan central business district during rush hour without at least three passengers. Mass transit riders "scrambled" to find taxis, while some passengers roller-skated, rowed boats, or flew helicopters to work. The first day of the strike, April 1, saw 83% of commuters going to work, compared to 94% on an average day. Residents of transit-deprived parts of New York City started a share taxi service with minibuses and their own private vehicles. These "dollar vans", which charged a dollar per passenger per ride, still operate. Commuters were seen bringing around jogging or exercise clothing so they could walk, jog, or bike to and from work. Additionally, the City University of New York canceled classes at three of its campuses as a result of the strike. Workers in the manufacturing and health industries were the most affected by the strike, as they were less likely to be able to afford taxis and other alternative modes of transport.

Complicating the matter, workers for the Long Island Rail Road, another MTA subsidiary, went on strike on April 2. This was actually the LIRR's second strike in four months, with the first one having occurred in December 1979. This strike also revolved around a lack of pay. Because of the strike, the remaining operating transit agencies in the area, Conrail and PATH, had increased ridership, and bridges and tunnels into Manhattan saw more vehicular traffic than usual.

By April 4, the fourth day of the strike, the MTA and the workers were deadlocked, and the agency sought to fine the unions $3 million per day in damages. A court hearing was held to determine whether the workers were actually striking, and thus subject to fines. Three days later, the MTA and the workers were preparing for another round of negotiations. The unions softened their demand for a wage raise. On April 9, a New York State Supreme Court justice fined the unions a total of $1 million for striking during the past eight days.

The MTA reached separate agreements with the LIRR and the NYCTA unions on April 11. The next day, the workers went back to work. The TWU won a 9% raise in the first year and 8% in the second year, along with a cost-of-living adjustment.

Mayor Ed Koch became a very popular and visible figure to the commuting public. He was widely seen crossing the Brooklyn Bridge, near New York City Hall, with the masses of people commuting on foot, famously asking people "How'm I doing?" He took a hard line against the strike, saying, "I think what the public is saying is, 'Don't give in to strikes and threats.'" This was contrasted with the actions of Mayor John Lindsay during the 1966 strike. While Lindsay had asked most workers to stay home, Koch actively cheered on commuters who walked across the Brooklyn Bridge.

== Effects ==
The population of Manhattan is said to have increased by 500,000 people during the strike, primarily corporate employees staying in hotel rooms. Bicycle commutes were popular; they were estimated to have increased by 200,000 people. This was attributed to the warm spring weather that was present when the strike occurred. During the strike, the city lost approximately $2 million a day in taxes and another $1 million a day in overtime expenses for city employees. Companies in the private sector lost approximately $100 million per day, on top of a total of $75 million to $100 million of lost income. Job absenteeism was estimated to be between 15 and 20 percent.

The "sneaker brigade:" women commuters entering and migrating across Manhattan, who continued office jobs during the strike, switched from heels to athletic sneakers with short cotton socks, to walk from the Port Authority Bus Terminal and Grand Central Terminal and across the bridges and down the avenues. This practical fashion accommodation persisted after the strike, even when mass transit resumed.

After the strike, NYCTA fares were increased from 50 cents to 60 cents in order to offset the heavy losses suffered by the MTA during the strike.

The Taylor Law, passed after the 1966 strike, specifically forbids any public union from going on strike. The striking workers were fined $1.25 million and the union lost dues check-off rights for four months. The strike was thus unsuccessful, as it resulted in a net negative impact for the unions. They did not strike again until 2005.

In an unrelated strike in summer 1980, PATH employees went on strike for 81 days. It was one of the longest strikes in the PATH's history.

The strike inspired rappers Duke Bootee and Melle Mel to write the song "The Message", which was recorded by Melle's group Grandmaster Flash and the Furious Five and released in 1982 on the Sugar Hill label. The song became a staple of 1980's Hip hop music.

== See also ==
- 1966 New York City transit strike
- 2005 New York City transit strike
