= List of unions affiliated with the AFL-CIO =

Below is a list of unions affiliated with the AFL-CIO. Since the founding of the AFL in 1886, the AFL-CIO and its predecessor bodies have been the dominant labor federation (at least in terms of the number of member workers, if not influence) in the United States. As of 2014, the labor federation had approximately 12.7 million members. As of 2015, the AFL–CIO had 56 member unions.

== Historical context ==
=== AFL forms ===
On December 8, 1886, the five-year-old Federation of Organized Trades and Labor Unions dissolved itself and became the American Federation of Labor (AFL). In its first half-century, a large number of trade and labor unions formed, joined the AFL, and either merged with other unions or ceased to exist. Many unions, particularly those in the construction industry and affiliated building trades, disaffiliated from the AFL for a variety of reasons. Some rejoined; some did not.

Throughout the AFL's history, jurisdictional issues caused a number of disaffiliations. In contrast to its early rival, the Knights of Labor, the AFL had adopted a policy of forming and admitting to membership (with a few limited, and notable, exceptions such as the United Mine Workers and Brewery Workers) only craft unions—unions whose membership was limited to workers with a single, narrow skill-set. But industrialization, with its emphasis on teams rather than individual workers manufacturing a product, disadvantaged craft unions in the drive to organize workers. A notable example was the effort to unionize the steel industry, where the Amalgamated Association of Iron and Steel Workers' adherence to craft unionism was a factor in the failure of many unionization drives. Some unions, including some large ones such as the Mine Workers, began advocating for a shift toward industrial unionism, where a union would organize all workers (regardless of skills) in a single company, market, or industry.

=== CIO splits, 1936–1955 ===
The battle between the craft and industrial union philosophies led to a major membership loss for the AFL in 1935. In the first years of the Great Depression, a number of AFL member unions advocated for a relaxation of the strict "craft union only" membership policy but to no avail. In 1932, Mine Workers president John L. Lewis privately proposed to several like-minded union presidents that those unions which wanted to organize workers on an industrial basis form a group to begin to do just that. The group met informally for three years, and lost a number of jurisdictional battles over potential or newly organized workers. Eight national unions formally organized themselves into the Committee for Industrial Organization (CIO) on November 9, 1935. On September 10, 1936, the AFL suspended all 10 CIO unions (two more had joined in the previous year) and their four million members. In 1938, these unions formed the Congress of Industrial Organizations as a rival labor federation.

Over the next 20 years, both the AFL and CIO would lose member unions. The AFL would purge some member unions for advocating industrial unionism (notably the United Auto Workers and the United Rubber Workers) or for supporting political philosophies it felt were antithetical to its purposes. It also reaffiliated some unions which had joined the CIO. The CIO, for its part, expelled a number of unions in 1948 after concluding they had become infiltrated by Communists (at least one additional union disaffiliated rather than be expelled). Both the AFL and CIO would form new unions to compete with those they had expelled, with varying degrees of success.

=== AFL–CIO, 1955–1999 ===
By the early 1950s, however, the disagreement over craft and industrial unionism had largely ceased to exist. In 1955, the AFL and CIO merged to forming a new entity known as the American Federation of Labor–Congress of Industrial Organizations (AFL–CIO). Over the next five decades, the AFL–CIO continued to gain and lose member unions. After a series of particularly divisive union raids on one another as well as repeated jurisdictional squabbles, the AFL adopted Article 20 of its constitution, which prevented its member unions from raiding one another—a policy retained in the AFL–CIO constitution. Theoretically, violation of Article 20 could lead to expulsion, but corruption soon became much more important than jurisdictional issues. After hearings by the Senate Select Committee on Improper Activities in Labor and Management led to major revelations regarding the dominance of several AFL-CIO unions by organized crime, new rules were enacted by the AFL–CIO's Executive Council that provided for the removal of vice presidents engaged in corruption as well as the ejection of unions considered corrupt. The labor federation expelled the International Brotherhood of Teamsters on corruption charges on December 6, 1957.

Membership changes continued, albeit at a markedly lower level, throughout the last four decades of the 20th century. On a few occasions, unions in the construction industry disaffiliated and reaffiliated. The most important membership changes, however, occurred in 1968. The United Auto Workers (UAW) disaffiliated from the AFL-CIO on July 1, 1968, after UAW President Walter Reuther and AFL–CIO President George Meany could not come to agreement on a wide range of national public policy issues or on reforms regarding AFL–CIO governance. A few days after the UAW's disaffiliation, the UAW and the Teamsters formed a new labor federation, the Alliance for Labor Action (ALA). Several smaller AFL–CIO unions either joined the ALA and were expelled from the AFL–CIO for dual unionism or disaffiliated and joined the ALA. The ALA was not successful, however, and ceased to exist in January 1972. Over the years, most of the unions which had been expelled or left the AFL–CIO rejoined it. For example, the UAW re-affiliated on July 1, 1981, and the Teamsters did so on October 24, 1987.

=== 21st century ===
The AFL–CIO saw several disaffiliations in the first decade of the 21st century. The United Brotherhood of Carpenters and Joiners of America disaffiliated from the AFL–CIO on March 29, 2001, disagreeing with the labor federation's rapid expansion in spending. After lengthy debate and disagreement over dues levels, the governance structure, the leadership, and the philosophy of the AFL–CIO, the Laborers' International Union of North America, Service Employees International Union, Teamsters, UNITE HERE, United Farm Workers, and United Food and Commercial Workers disaffiliated from the AFL–CIO to form the Change to Win, a new national union federation. The Carpenters joined the new federation as well.

After the split, the AFL–CIO gained two new members. The 100,000-member independent California School Employees Association joined the federation in August 2001, and the 65,000-member independent California Nurses Association joined in March 2007. After a lengthy and divisive internal leadership struggle within UNITE HERE, 100,000 members of the union's apparel division disaffiliated from the national union in March 2009, formed a new union called Workers United, and affiliated their union with SEIU. The remaining 265,000 members of UNITE HERE reaffiliated with the AFL–CIO on September 16, 2009.

LIUNA rejoined the AFL–CIO in August 2010. Three years later, UFCW did as well. The National Football League Players Association (NFLPA) was decertified in 2010 as players faced a lockout, but reformed and rejoined the AFL–CIO in 2011. The National Taxi Workers Alliance (also known as the New York Taxi Workers Alliance) affiliated with the AFL–CIO as well. It was the first non-traditional workers' organization to do so since the early 1960s. However, the International Longshore and Warehouse Union disaffiliated from the federation on August 30, 2013, accusing the AFL–CIO of unwillingness to punish other unions when their members crossed ILWU picket lines and over federal legislative policy issues.

== AFL–CIO membership criteria ==
Article III of the AFL–CIO constitution, as amended, addresses membership in the AFL–CIO. Membership is limited to national and international unions and to certain subordinate bodies of the AFL–CIO (such as organizing committees, directly affiliated local unions, departments, and state and local central labor bodies).

Article III, Section 4(a) gives the Executive Council (or the President, if the Executive Council so designates) the power to approve new affiliations, and restricts new affiliates to union whose jurisdiction does not conflict with the jurisdiction of existing members (unless the existing members authorize such affiliation). Article III, Section 4(b) provides for provisional charters and the attaching of conditions to provisional charters. Section 5 declares that charters shall not be revoked without a two-thirds affirmative vote of the convention, and for the restoration of charters upon a two-thirds vote of either the convention or Executive Council. Section 7 provides for the expulsion of member unions if they are "officered, controlled or dominated by persons whose policies and activities are consistently directed toward the achievement of the program or purposes of authoritarianism, totalitarianism, terrorism and other forces that suppress individual liberties and freedom of association".

Article X, Section 8 gives the Executive Council the authority to investigate "any situation in which there is reason to believe that any affiliate is dominated, controlled or substantially influenced in the conduct of its affairs by any corrupt influence" and upon a two-thirds vote suspend any member found to be so influenced. Article X, Section 17 permits the Executive Council to establish a code of ethical conduct for the AFL–CIO, its departments and councils, and its staff; to require member unions to also establish such codes; and upon a two-thirds vote to suspend any member found to be in violation of such codes.

Article III, Section 8, amended in 2005, establishes that it is the official policy of the AFL–CIO to encourage its members with overlapping and/or conflicting jurisdiction to merge, to encourage smaller unions to merge into larger ones, and to encourage member unions to reduce overlapping jurisdiction.

Article IV of the AFL–CIO constitution provides for representation of members at the quadrennial convention. Article X of the AFL–CIO constitution provides for an Executive Council, and for representation of members on this council.

Article XI of the AFL–CIO constitution provides for a General Board, and for representation of members on this board.

== Currently affiliated unions ==
This is a list of AFL–CIO affiliated member unions:

- Air Line Pilots Association (ALPA)
- Amalgamated Transit Union (ATU)
- American Federation of Government Employees (AFGE)
- American Federation of Musicians of the United States and Canada (AFM)
- American Federation of School Administrators (AFSA)
- American Federation of State, County and Municipal Employees (AFSCME)
- American Federation of Teachers (AFT)
- American Postal Workers Union (APWU)
- American Radio Association (ARA)
- American Train Dispatchers Association (ATDA)
- Associated Actors and Artistes of America (4As)
  - Actors' Equity Association (AEA)
  - American Guild of Musical Artists (AGMA)
  - American Guild of Variety Artists (AGVA)
  - The Guild of Italian American Actors (GIAA)
  - Screen Actors Guild-American Federation of Television and Radio Artists (SAG-AFTRA)
- Bakery, Confectionery, Tobacco Workers and Grain Millers' International Union (BCTGM)
- Brotherhood of Railroad Signalmen (BRS)
- California School Employees Association (CSEA)
- Communications Workers of America (CWA)
  - Association of Flight Attendants (AFA-CWA)
  - Industrial Division, CWA (IUE-CWA)
  - National Association of Broadcast Employees and Technicians (NABET-CWA)
  - The Newspaper Guild (TNG-CWA)
  - Printing, Publishing and Media Workers (PPMW-CWA)
- Farm Labor Organizing Committee (FLOC)
- Gay and Lesbian Labor Activists Network (GALLAN)
- International Alliance of Theatrical Stage Employees, Moving Picture Technicians, Artists and Allied Crafts of the United States, Its Territories and Canada (IATSE)
- International Association of Bridge, Structural, Ornamental and Reinforcing Iron Workers (Ironworkers)
- International Association of Fire Fighters (IAFF)
- International Association of Heat and Frost Insulators and Allied Workers
- International Association of Machinists and Aerospace Workers (IAM)
  - Transportation Communications International Union
- International Association of Sheet Metal, Air, Rail and Transportation Workers (SMART)
- International Brotherhood of Boilermakers, Iron Ship Builders, Blacksmiths, Forgers and Helpers (IBB)
- International Brotherhood of Electrical Workers (IBEW)
- International Federation of Professional and Technical Engineers (IFPTE)
- International Longshoremen's Association (ILA)
- International Organization of Masters, Mates & Pilots (MMP)
- International Plate Printers, Die Stampers and Engravers Union of North America
- International Union of Allied Novelty and Production Workers (Novelty and Production Workers)
- International Union of Bricklayers and Allied Craftworkers (BAC)
- International Union of Elevator Constructors (IUEC)
- International Union of Operating Engineers (IUOE)
- International Union of Painters and Allied Trades (IUPAT)
- International Union of Police Associations (IUPA)
- Laborers' International Union of North America (LIUNA)
  - National Postal Mail Handlers Union (NPMHU)
- Major League Baseball Players Association (MLBPA)
- Marine Engineers Beneficial Association (MEBA)
- National Air Traffic Controllers Association (NATCA)
- National Association of Letter Carriers (NALC)
- National Football League Players Association (NFLPA)
- National Hockey League Players' Association (NHLPA)
- National Nurses United (NNU)
- National Taxi Workers' Alliance (NTWA)
- National Women's Soccer League Players Association (NWSLPA)
- Office and Professional Employees International Union (OPEIU)
- Operative Plasterers' and Cement Masons' International Association of the United States and Canada (OPCMIA)
- Professional Aviation Safety Specialists (PASS)
- Professional Hockey Players' Association (PHPA)
- Seafarers International Union of North America (SIU)
  - American Maritime Officers (AMO)
- Service Employees International Union (SEIU)
- Transport Workers Union of America (TWU)
- UNITE HERE
- United Association of Journeymen and Apprentices of the Plumbing and Pipe Fitting Industry of the United States and Canada (UA)
- United Automobile, Aerospace and Agricultural Implement Workers of America International Union (UAW)
- United Food and Commercial Workers (UFCW)
- United Mine Workers of America (UMWA)
- United Steelworkers (USW)
- United Union of Roofers, Waterproofers and Allied Workers (Roofers and Waterproofers)
- Utility Workers Union of America (UWUA)
- Writers Guild of America East (WGAE)

== Formerly affiliated unions ==
Union	Abbreviation	Founded	Affiliated	Left	Reason left	Membership (1957)	Membership (1980)
1199 National Health and Human Services Employees' Union		1932	1996	1998	Merged into SEIU	N/A	N/A
Air Line Dispatchers' Association	ALDA		1955	1977	Dissolved	550	N/A
Aluminum, Brick and Glass Workers' International Union	ABG	1982	1982	1996	Merged into USW	N/A	N/A
Aluminum Workers' International Union	AWIU	1953	1955	1982	Merged into ABG	24,000	29,000
Amalgamated Clothing Workers of America	ACWA	1914	1955	1976	Merged into ACTWU	385,000	N/A
Amalgamated Clothing and Textile Workers Union	ACTWU	1976	1976	1995	Merged into UNITE	N/A	526,000
Amalgamated Lithographers of America	ALA	1915	1955	1958	Disaffiliated	32,000	N/A
Amalgamated Meat Cutters and Butcher Workmen of North America	AMC	1897	1955	1979	Merged into UFCW	310,000	N/A
American Bakery and Confectionery Workers' International Union	ABC	1957	1957	1969	Merged into BCTGM	N/A	N/A
American Federation of Grain Millers	AFGM	1936	1955	1999	Merged into BCTGM	39,000	35,000
American Federation of Hosiery Workers	AFHW	1915	1955	1976	Merged into ACTWU	10,000	N/A
American Flint Glass Workers' Union	AFGWU	1878	1955	2003	Merged into USW	35,000	33,375
American Newspaper Guild	ANG	1933	1955	1995	Merged into CWA	29,000	33,518
American Railway and Airway Supervisors' Association	ARASA	1934	1955	1980	Merged into TCU	8,000	7,054
American Wire Weavers' Protective Association	WWPA	1900	1955	1964	Suspended	431	N/A
Association of Flight Attendants	AFA	1945	1984	2003	Merged into CWA	N/A	N/A
Barbers' and Beauty Culturists' Union of America	BBC	1939	1955	1956	Merged into BBAIIA	N/A	N/A
Barbers, Beauticians and Allied Industries International Association	BBAIIA	1887	1955	1980	Merged into UFCW	72,000	40,000
Boot and Shoe Workers' Union	BSWU	1895	1955	1977	Merged into RCIU	40,000	N/A
Brotherhood of Locomotive Engineers	BofLE	1883	1989	2004	Merged into IBT	N/A	N/A
Brotherhood of Locomotive Firemen and Enginemen	BofLF&E	1873	1956	1969	Merged into UTU	97,000	N/A
Brotherhood of Maintenance of Way Employes	BMWE	1887	1955	2004	Merged into IBT	225,000	119,203
Brotherhood of Railroad Trainmen	BRT	1883	1957	1969	Merged into UTU	217,462	N/A
Brotherhood of Railway Carmen	BRC	1890	1955	1986	Merged into TCU	129,804	93,737
Brotherhood of Sleeping Car Porters	BSCP	1925	1955	1978	Merged into TCU	10,000	N/A
California Nurses Association	CNA	1903	2007	2009	Merged into NNA	N/A	N/A
Cigar Makers' International Union	CMIU	1864	1955	2003	Merged into RWDSU	8,046	
Coopers' International Union of North America	CIUNA	1864	1955	1992	Merged into GMP	3,900	1,056
Distillery, Wine and Allied Workers' International Union	DWAW	1940	1955	1996	Merged into UFCW	25,000	26,600
Flight Engineers' International Association	FEIA	1948	1955	2000	Dissolved	2,300	1,720
Glass Bottle Blowers' Association	GBBA	1895	1955	1982	Merged into GPPAW	51,650	81,000
Glass, Molders, Pottery, Plastics and Allied Workers International Union	GMPIU	1988	1988	2018	Merged into USW	N/A	N/A
Glass, Pottery, Plastics and Allied Workers' International Union	GPPAW	1982	1982	1988	Merged into GMP	N/A	N/A
Granite Cutters' International Association of America	GCIA	1877	1955	1980	Merged into TMT	4,000	N/A
Graphic Arts International Union	GAIU	1972	1972	1983	Merged into GCIU	N/A	88,837
Graphic Communications International Union	GCIU	1983	1983	2005	Merged into IBT	N/A	N/A
Hotel Employees and Restaurant Employees Union	HERE	1891	1955	2004	Merged into UNITE HERE	441,000	403,890
Industrial Union of Marine and Shipbuilding Workers of America	IUMSWA	1933	1955	1988	Merged into IAM	40,000	25,000
Insurance Agents' International Union	IAIU	1951	1955	1959	Merged into IWIU	11,000	N/A
Insurance Workers' International Union	IWIU	1959	1959	1983	Merged into UFCW	N/A	20,000
Insurance Workers of America	IWA	1950	1955	1959	Merged into IWIU	13,000	N/A
International Alliance of Bill Posters, Billers and Distributors of the United States and Canada	BPBD	1902	1955	1977	Dissolved	1,600	N/A
International Association of Cleaning and Dye House Workers	CDHW	1937	1955	1956	Merged into LWIU	N/A	N/A
International Association of Siderographers	IAS	1899	1955	1992	Merged into IAM	45	15
International Broom and Whisk Makers' Union	BWM	1893	1955	1962	Dissolved	380	N/A
International Brotherhood of Firemen and Oilers	IBFO	1898	1955	2008	Merged into SEIU	50,000	43,000
International Brotherhood of Longshoremen	IBL	1953	1955	1959	Merged into ILA	30,000	N/A
International Brotherhood of Pottery and Allied Workers	IBPAW	1890	1955	1982	Merged into GPPAW	26,000	16,938
International Brotherhood of Papermakers	IBP	1902	1955	1957	Merged into UPP	N/A	N/A
International Brotherhood of Pulp, Sulphite, and Paper Mill Workers	IBPSPMW	1906	1955	1972	Merged into UPIU	165,000	N/A
International Brotherhood of Teamsters	IBT	1903	1955	2005	Transferred to CtW	1,368,082	1,923,896
International Chemical Workers' Union	ICWU	1940	1955	1996	Merged into UFCW	84,299	65,800
International Glove Workers' Union of America	IGWUA	1902	1955	1961	Merged into ACTWU	3,100	N/A
International Jewelry Workers' Union	IJWU	1916	1955	1980	Merged into SEIU	32,000	9,500
International Ladies Garment Workers Union	ILGWU	1900	1955	1995	Merged into UNITE	450,802	348,380
International Leather Goods, Plastic and Novelty Workers' Union	ILGPNWU	1937	1955	1996	Merged into SEIU	31,700	27,000
International Longshore and Warehouse Union	ILWU	1937	1988	2013	Disaffiliated	N/A	N/A
International Molders and Allied Workers Union	IMAWU	1859	1955	1988	Merged into GMP	72,593	66,449
International Photo-Engravers Union of North America	IPEU	1904	1955	1964	Merged into LPIU	16,739	N/A
International Printing and Graphics Communications Union	IPGCU	1973	1973	1983	Merged into GCIU	N/A	120,000
International Printing Pressmen and Assistants' Union of North America	IPPU	1889	1955	1973	Merged into IPGCU	104,000	N/A
International Stereotypers' and Electrotypers' Union	ISEU	1902	1955	1973	Merged into IPGCU	13,577	N/A
International Typographical Union	ITU	1852	1955	1987	Merged into CWA	99,179	88,876
International Union, Allied Industrial Workers of America	AIW	1935	1955	1994	Merged into UPIU	80,000	90,686
International Union of United Brewery, Flour, Cereal, Soft Drink and Distillery Workers	IUB	1886	1955	1973	Merged into IBT	62,000	N/A
International Union of Electrical, Radio and Machine Workers	IUE	1949	1955	2000	Merged into CWA	397,412	255,427
International Union of Journeymen Horseshoers of the United States and Canada	IUJAT	1874	1955	2002	Merged into USW	260	400
International Union of Wood, Wire and Metal Lathers	WWML	1899	1955	1979	Merged into UBC	16,500	N/A
International Woodworkers of America	IWA	1937	1955	1994	Merged into IAM	98,517	117,691
Journeymen Stonecutters' Association of North America	JSANA	1907	1955	1968	Merged into LIUNA	1,900	N/A
Laundry Workers' International Union	LWIU	1900	1955	1957	Suspended	90,000	N/A
Leather Workers' International Union of America	LWU	1955	1955	1992	Merged into OPEIU	5,743	2,110
Lithographers' and Photoengravers' International Union	LPIU	1964	1964	1972	Merged into GAIU	N/A	N/A
Mechanics Educational Society of America	MESA	1933	1955	1997	Merged into UAW	49,423	25,000
Metal Polishers', Buffers', Platers' and Allied Workers' International Union	MPBP	1892	1955	1996	Merged into IBB	25,000	10,000
National Agricultural Workers' Union	NAWU	1934	1955	1970		4,500	N/A
National Association of Broadcast Employees and Technicians	NABET	1934	1955	1994	Merged into CWA	5,100	7,300
National Association of Master Mechanics and Foremen of Naval Shore Establishments	NAMMFNSE	1933	1955	1964	Disaffiliated	556	N/A
National Association of Post Office and Postal Transportation Service Mail Handlers, Watchmen and Messengers	POMH	1912	1955	1968	Merged into LIUNA	9,000	N/A
National Association of Post Office and General Services Maintenance Employees	NAPOGSME	1937	1966	1971	Merged into APWU	N/A	N/A
National Federation of Post Office Clerks	NFPOC	1906	1955	1961	Merged into UFPC	97,052	N/A
National Federation of Post Office Motor Vehicle Employees	NFPOMVE	1924	1958	1971	Merged into APWU	N/A	N/A
National Association of Special Delivery Messengers	SDM	1932	1955	1971	Merged into APWU	2,000	N/A
National Maritime Union of America	NMU	1937	1955	2001	Merged into SIU	40,000	50,000
National Postal Transport Association	NPTA	1898	1955	1961	Merged into UFPC	26,800	N/A
National Union of Hospital and Health Care Employees	NUHHCE	1973	1984	1989	Disaffiliated	N/A	N/A
Oil, Chemical and Atomic Workers International Union	OCAW	1917	1955	1999	Merged into PACE	183,000	180,000
Order of Railroad Telegraphers	ORT	1886	1955	1969	Merged into TCU	65,267	N/A
Paper, Allied-Industrial, Chemical and Energy Workers International Union	PACE	1999	1999	2005	Merged into USW	N/A	N/A
Pattern Makers' League of North America	PMLNA	1887	1955	1991	Merged into IAM	15,000	9,600
Radio and Television Directors' Guild	RTDG	1947	1955	1960	Merged into DGA	800	N/A
Railroad Yardmasters of America	RYA	1912	1955	1985	Merged into UTU	4,610	4,701
Railway Patrolmen's International Union	RPIU	1949	1955	1969	Merged into TCU	3,201	N/A
Retail Clerks International Union	RCIU	1890	1955	1979	Merged into UFCW	300,000	N/A
Retail, Wholesale and Department Store Union	RWDSU	1937	1955	1993	Merged into UFCW	117,668	198,000
Sheet Metal Workers' International Association	SMWIA	1888	1955	2014	Merged into SMART	50,000	158,528
Stove, Furnace and Allied Appliance Workers' International Union of North America	SFAW	1894	1955	1994	Merged into IBB	9,183	6,400
Switchmen's Union of North America	SUNA	1894	1955	1964	Merged into UTU	18,800	N/A
Textile Workers Union of America	TWUA	1939	1955	1976	Merged into ACTWU	202,700	N/A
Tile, Marble, Terrazzo, Finishers', Shopworkers' and Granite Cutters' International Union	TMT	1901	1955	1988	Merged into UBC	8,200	9,300
Tobacco Workers International Union	TWIU	1895	1955	1978	Merged into BCTGM	34,686	N/A
Transportation Communications International Union	TCU	1899	1955	2012	Merged into IAM	350,000	201,083
Union of Needletrades, Industrial and Textile Employees	UNITE	1995	1995	2004	Merged into UNITE HERE	N/A	N/A
United American Nurses	UAN	1999	2001	2009	Merged into NNU	N/A	N/A
United Brick and Clay Workers of America	UBCWA	1917	1955	1981	Merged into ABG		15,000
United Brotherhood of Carpenters and Joiners of America	UBC	1867	1955	2001	Disaffiliated	850,000	780,398
United Cement, Lime and Gypsum Workers International Union	UCLGWIU	1939	1955	1984	Merged into IBB	40,000	36,800
United Farm Workers of America	UFW	1962	1972	2006	Transferred to CtW	N/A	25,000
United Federation of Postal Clerks	UFPC	1961	1961	1971	Merged into APWU	N/A	N/A
United Furniture Workers of America	UFWA	1937	1955	1987	Merged into IUE	50,000	27,042
United Garment Workers of America	UGWA	1891	1955	1994	Merged into UFCW	40,000	31,000
United Glass and Ceramics Workers of North America	UGCWNA	1937	1955	1982	Merged into ABG	53,000	34,539
United Hatters, Cap and Millinery Workers International Union	UHCMW	1934	1955	1983	Merged into ACTWU	40,000	10,000
United Packinghouse Workers of America	UPWA	1943	1955	1968	Merged into AMC	150,000	N/A
United Papermakers and Paperworkers	UPP	1957	1957	1972	Merged into UPIU	130,000	N/A
United Paperworkers of America	UPA	1944	1955	1957	Merged into UPP	N/A	N/A
United Paperworkers' International Union	UPIU	1972	1972	1999	Merged into PACE	N/A	284,329
United Rubber, Cork, Linoleum, and Plastic Workers of America	URW	1935	1955	1995	Merged into USW	178,017	199,990
United Shoe Workers of America	USWA	1937	1955	1979	Merged into ACTWA	60,000	N/A
United Stone and Allied Products Workers of America	USAPWA	1903	1955	1970	Merged into USW	13,260	N/A
United Telegraph Workers	UTW	1903	1955	1986	Merged into CWA	32,000	11,466
United Textile Workers of America	UTW	1901	1955	1996	Merged into UFCW	100,000	40,000
United Transportation Union	UTU	1969	1969	2014	Merged into SMART	N/A	175,500
United Transport Service Employees of America	UTSEA	1942	1955	1972	Merged into TCIU	6,500	N/A
United Wall Paper Craftsmen and Workers of North America	UWPC	1923	1955	1958	Merged into IBPSPMW	1,500	N/A
Upholsterers International Union of North America	UIU	1882	1955	1985	Merged into USW	55,569	48,920
Window Glass Cutters' League of America	WCGLA	1917	1955	1975	Merged into GBBA	1,600	N/A

Disaffiliated and re-affiliated

- International Brotherhood of Teamsters (IBT or Teamsters) – expelled by AFL–CIO in 1957 for corruption; re-affiliated with AFL–CIO in 1987; disaffiliated in 2005 and became founding member union of Change to Win
- Laborers' International Union of North America (LIUNA) – founding member union of Change to Win in 2005, but re-affiliated with the AFL–CIO in 2010
- UNITE HERE – founding member union of Change to Win in 2005, but re-affiliated with the AFL–CIO in 2009
- United Auto Workers (UAW) – disaffiliated in 1968 to form the Alliance for Labor Action with the Teamsters, re-affiliated in 1981
- United Food and Commercial Workers – founding member union of Change to Win in 2005, but re-affiliated with the AFL–CIO in 2013
- Service Employees International Union – founding member union of Change to Win in 2005, but re-affiliated with the AFL–CIO in 2025

== See also ==
- Affiliated unions of the Canadian Labour Congress
- Global list of trade unions
