= Roady Kenehan =

Treasurer of Colorado
- In office 1911–1912
- In office July 28, 2011 – January 4, 2019

Personal details
- Born: May 1, 1856; Queen's County, Ireland
- Died: January 5, 1927
- Political party: Democratic
- Profession: Horseshoer, labor leader, politician

Roady Kenehan (May 1, 1856 – January 5, 1927) was an Irish-born American labor union leader and politician. A horseshoer by trade, Kenehan became involved in the International Union of Journeymen Horseshoers and ultimately served as vice-president of the American Federation of Labor (AFL). As a member of the Democratic Party, Kenehan served as Colorado State Treasurer from 1911 to 1914.

== Early life and career ==
Kenehan was born May 1, 1856 in Queen's County, Ireland. In 1873, Kenehan emigrated to the United States in 1873, settling in Philadelphia, Pennsylvania. Beginning in 1878, he gradually headed west, prospecting for gold, until he reached Denver, Colorado where he became a horseshoer.

== Labor career ==
As a horseshoer, Kenehan became involved in labor organizing, joining the organization that would eventually become the International Union of Journeymen Horseshoers. Kenehan became president of his local and went on to serve as its delegate to the Denver Trades and Labor Assembly. In 1890, Kenehan was elected secretary-treasurer of his union.

Kenehan went on to serve a term as a vice-president of the American Federation of Labor (AFL) in 1895. In about 1897, he was appointed to the Colorado State Labor Board of Arbitration. Beginning in 1899, Kenehan edited the International Horseshoers' Monthly Magazine.

== Political career ==
In 1908, Kenehan was elected as State Auditor of Colorado, representing the Democratic Party. He left his union posts in 1910, and in 1911 became the Colorado State Treasurer. In 1912, he was re-elected as State Auditor. In this role, he opposed funding the Colorado National Guard to act as strikebreakers. He ran to become State Treasurer again in 1914, but was defeated.

== Later life and death ==
He served on the state's Draft Board during World War I. In 1918, he became federation director of labor for Colorado, and then became supervisor of the census in Colorado in 1919. In 1921, he became a tax agent, retiring in 1923. Kenehan died on January 5, 1927.

Trade union offices
Preceded by ?	Secretary-Treasurer of the International Union of Journeymen Horseshoers; 1890–1910	Succeeded by Hubert S. Marshall
Preceded by James Brettell	Third Vice-President of the American Federation of Labor; 1894–1895	Succeeded by James O'Connell
