= James Brettell (unionist) =

James Brettell (January 2, 1845 – November 13, 1929) was a British-born American banker and labor unionist.

Born in South Staffordshire in England, Brettell began working at the New British Iron Company at Brierley Hill when only eight years old. In 1868, he emigrated to the United States, settling in Pottsville, Pennsylvania, and working in the iron mills there. He moved around the Mid West until 1879, when he and some colleagues founded a nail mill in Centralia, Illinois. This proved successful, and led them to found a steel mill, but it was unprofitable, and in 1890, the business closed.

Brettell joined the Amalgamated Association of Iron and Steel Workers in the 1880s, and was corresponding representative of his local in 1888. After his business closed, he found work in Mingo Junction, Ohio, as a puddler, then as a heater, and increased his union activity. In 1893, he served a term as a vice-president of the American Federation of Labor, while campaigning for compulsory arbitration between employers and unions. He also joined the People's Party, and stood unsuccessfully for Congress in 1894.

From 1897, Brettell worked for the Laughlin & Junction Steel Company in a back office capacity. In 1899, he started a real estate and insurance business. This proved immediately successful; the following year, he built the Brettell Block as its headquarters. He was a founding director of the Steubenville Loan Association, was an organizer of the Centralia Building and Loan Association, and was a leading stockholder of the First National Bank of Mingo Junction. He died in 1929.

Trade union offices
Preceded by New position	Third Vice-President of the American Federation of Labor; 1893–1894	Succeeded by Roady Kenehan
