= Frank Morrison (trade unionist) =

Canadian trade union leader

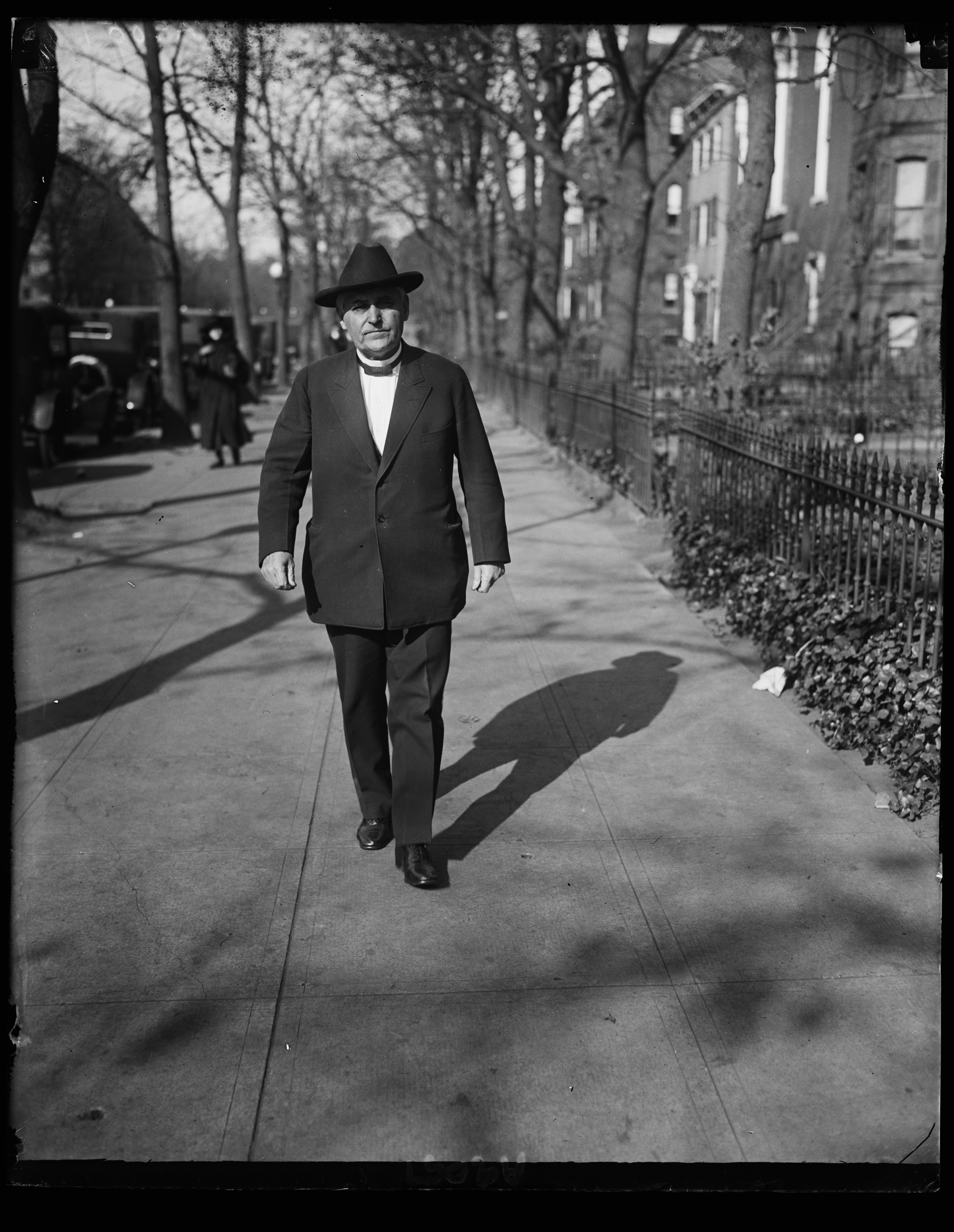
Morrison in 1924

Frank Morrison (23 November 1859 – 12 March 1949) was a Canadian trade union leader.

Born in Franktown, Canada West, Morrison grew up in Walkerton, where he became a printer. In 1886, he moved to Chicago, and there he joined the International Typographical Union. He qualified in law at Lake Forest University, and joined the Illinois Bar.

Morrison became active in the American Federation of Labor (AFL), within which he was a supporter of Samuel Gompers and the conservative wing of the movement, and he opposed organizing recent immigrants or black workers. He was first elected as secretary of the AFL in 1897. In 1919, he attended the conference which founded the International Labour Organization. He successfully argued for a wide range of labour legislation, for the creation of the Department of Labor, and for the creation of the Social Security system.

In 1936, the role of treasurer was added to Morrison's position in the AFL. He finally retired in 1939, at the age of eighty, and he died ten years later.

Trade union offices
Preceded by August McCraith	Secretary of the American Federation of Labor; 1897–1935	Succeeded by Position merged
Preceded by New position	Secretary-Treasurer of the American Federation of Labor; 1936–1939	Succeeded by George Meany
