= International Spinners' Union =

The International Spinners' Union (ISU) was a labor union representing cotton spinners in the United States.

The union was founded in 1858 as the Benevolent and Protective Association of the United Operative Mule Spinners of New England, and in about 1861 it shortened its name to the Amalgamated Mule Spinners' Association. In 1881, it was a founding affiliate of the American Federation of Labor (AFL). It left the AFL in 1887 and was reorganized as the National Cotton Mule Spinners' Association of America, then reaffiliated to the AFL two years later.

In 1899, the union became the National Spinners' Association of America, then in 1906 it became the ISU. The AFL ordered it to merge into the United Textile Workers of America in 1919, but the union refused and so was suspended from the federation at the end of the year. It continued on an independent basis, and by 1926 had about 8,000 members, all in New England. At that time, it was affiliated to the Federated Textile Union, along with the Amalgamated Lace Operatives of America, the American Federation of Textile Operatives, and the Tapestry Carpet Weavers.

The union again affiliated to the AFL in 1937, but was suspended again in 1950, for non-payment of dues. It dissolved in about 1954.
