= Paving Cutters' Union =

Former trade union of the U.S. and Canada

- International Paving Cutters' Union of the United States of America and Canada
- Founded: 1887
- Dissolved: 1956
- Headquarters: Rockport, Massachusetts
- Location: United States, Canada
- Affiliations: American Federation of Labor

The International Paving Cutters' Union of the United States of America and Canada was a trade union affiliated with the American Federation of Labor with members in Canada and the United States. A craft union, its members claimed "sole jurisdiction over the cutting of stone paving blocks, which includes: Flanged, beveled, and all stone blocks used in courts, alleys, yards, or streets for paving; also stone blocks and rough ashlar used for building purposes on which paving-cutters' tools are used."

== History ==
In June 1887, delegates from local paving cutters unions across North America met in Baltimore, Maryland, in June 1887. It was founded because of recent cuts to wages in the industry. However, in that year, the Paving Cutters' joined the Granite Cutters' International Association and other affiliated unions in a disastrous general strike. Combined with the severe economic downturn associated Panic of 1893, the union was impacted. The Westerly, RI branch continued to be active as reported in the local newspaper, The Westerly Sun. In April 1895 it was reported that the National Secretary of the union was visiting Westerly due to challenges of losing members. Later that year, at the first Labor Day Parade in Westerly, the Paving Cutter' union was represented by 25 men and a float. In 1896, the Paving Cutters' union in Westerly does not have cash available to pay its share of the deficit for Labor Day celebrations indicating its difficulties. It was reorganized in 1901 in Lithonia, Georgia, and affiliated with the AFL in 1904. In 1905, John Sheret of Albion, New York, was elected secretary.

On December 29, 1937, the union withdrew from the AFL. It survived for some time as an independent union, but by 1955 it had only 125 members, and it dissolved in about 1956.

== Membership ==
As of 1936, the union reported 2,200 members across 58 locals (52 in the U.S. and 6 in Canada).

Canada (6): Quebec (4), New Brunswick (1), and Ontario (1)

United States (52): Maine (10), Pennsylvania (7), New Hampshire (6), Massachusetts (4), Wisconsin (3), Georgia (3), New York (3), Missouri (3), Connecticut (2), Minnesota (2), New Jersey (2), North Carolina (2), California (1), Delaware (1), Maryland (1), South Carolina (1).
