= International Brotherhood of Foundry Employees =

Labor union

The International Brotherhood of Foundry Employees (IBFE) was a labour union representing foundry workers in the United States and Canada.

The union was founded at a meeting in St Louis, Missouri, on March 26, 1904, by various independent local unions. The union represented foundry workers who were not eligible for membership in the International Molders' Union of North America (IMUNA), and that union backed the IBFE's formation, and its chartering by the American Federation of Labor (AFL).

By 1925, the union had 3,500 members. In 1929, it negotiated a merger with the IMUNA, but although that union's leadership allowed its membership to vote on the idea, they argued that it would mean it could not maintain its benefits program, and its membership voted down the proposal.

On October 9, 1939, the union's charter was revoked by the AFL. It continued on an independent basis, becoming the International Brotherhood of Foundry and Metal Employees in 1947. By 1953, it had 2,000 members, and it dissolved later in the decade, its members transferring to the IMUNA.
