= Aluminum Workers of America =

Labor union

The Aluminum Workers of America (AWA) was a labor union representing workers in the aluminum industry in the United States.

The union was established on April 14, 1937 as a split from the Aluminum Workers' Council, under the leadership of president N. A. Zonarich. It affiliated to the Congress of Industrial Organizations. By 1944, it had grown to have 46,000 members. In June that year, it merged into the United Steelworkers of America.
