= Amalgamated Lace Operatives of America =

The Amalgamated Lace Operatives of America (ALOA) was a labor union representing workers involved in making items out of lace.

The union was founded in Philadelphia in 1892, as the Chartered Society of Amalgamated Lace Curtain Operatives of America. On 28 November 1894, it received a charter from the American Federation of Labor (AFL). In about 1903, it shortened its name to become the ALOA, as it opened a new "lever section" for workers who operated other lace-making machinery. The union received a new AFL charter in 1912.

In 1919, the AFL ordered the ALOA to merge into the United Textile Workers of America, but the ALOA refused and so was suspended from the federation at the end of the year. It continued on an independent basis, and by 1926 had about 1,600 members. At that time, it was affiliated to the Federated Textile Union, along with the International Spinners' Union, the American Federation of Textile Operatives, and the Tapestry Carpet Weavers.

After World War II, the industry steadily declined, and with it, membership of the union. By 1983, the union had only 165 working members, and in 1992, it finally dissolved.
