= August McCraith =

Augustine McCraith (January 19, 1864 – March 26, 1909) was a Canadian labor unionist.

Born on Prince Edward Island, McCraith became a printer and moved to Boston. He was an individualist anarchist, who argued that unions should be politically non-partisan. He joined the International Typographical Union's (ITU) Local 13, serving as president of the local from 1891, and then as its secretary from 1892 until 1895.

In 1894, McCraith was a delegate to the ITU's national convention, where he proved popular, and was delegated to attend the American Federation of Labor's (AFL) annual congress. There, he was an outspoken opponent of socialism, and won election as the federation's secretary, which entailed him moving to New York City. However, during the 1896 United States presidential election, he objected that Samuel Gompers, president of the AFL, had violated non-partisanship by supporting the Democratic Party. The AFL's executive declared that it retained confidence in Gompers, and McCraith did not re-nominate himself when his term as secretary ended, in 1897.

McCraith later became the publisher of the Bay Ridge Press newspaper. He died in Brooklyn, in 1909.

Trade union offices
Preceded by Chris Evans	Secretary of the American Federation of Labor; 1894–1897	Succeeded by Frank Morrison
