= International Jewelry Workers' Union =

The International Jewelry Workers' Union (IJWU) was a labor union representing workers involved in making jewelry in the United States and Canada.

An International Jewelry Workers' Union of America was founded in 1900 with the merger of several local unions, and it was chartered by the American Federation of Labor (AFL) on September 17, 1900. In 1903, it absorbed the International Watch Case Makers' Union, but its membership steadily declined, and it disbanded in 1913. Some of its locals survived, directly affiliated to the AFL, and on September 28, 1916, they merged to form the new IJWU, with a new AFL charter.

In 1918, the Diamond Workers' Protective Union absorbed diamond setters from the IJWU. The International Association of Machinists argued that it should represent jewelry tool and die makers, a dispute eventually settled. However, in a dispute with the Metal Polishers' International Union over the representation of jewelry polishers and buffers, the AFL found against the IJWU, which refused to transfer these members. As a result, in 1920, it was suspended from the AFL. This prompted the union to make concessions, and in 1922 it was readmitted.

By 1925, the union had about 800 members, growing to 16,000 by 1953. In 1955, it affiliated to the new AFL–CIO, and it absorbed the Diamond Workers' Protective Union, taking membership to 32,000 by 1957.

By 1980, the union's membership had fallen to 9,500, and on August 20, 1980, it merged into the Service Employees' International Union.

== Presidents ==
1916: Julius Birnbaum
Leon Williams
Jack Coleman
Joseph Morris
1959: Harry Spodick
1968: Leon Sverdlove
