= United Glass and Ceramics Workers of North America =

The United Glass and Ceramics Workers of North America (UGCWNA) was a labor union representing workers in several related industries in the United States and Canada.

The union was chartered by the American Federation of Labor (AFL) on August 7, 1934, as the Federation of Flat Glass Workers of America. It aligned with the Congress of Industrial Organizations (CIO), and as a result, was suspended from the AFL in 1936, and expelled in 1938. Its scope was broadened, and in 1940, it was renamed as the Federation of Glass, Ceramic and Silica Sand Workers of America.

In 1955, the union adopted its final name. Later in the year, it affiliated to the new AFL–CIO. By 1957, it had 53,000 members, but this fell to 34,539 by 1980. On September 1, 1982, it merged into the Aluminum, Brick and Clay Workers' International Union, which renamed itself as the Aluminum, Brick and Glass Workers' International Union.

== Presidents ==
1934: Glen W. McCabe
1937: Paul W. Fuller
1939: Joseph Froesch
1950: Burl Phares
1957: Ralph Reiser
1973: Joseph Roman
