= International Union, Allied Industrial Workers of America =

The International Union, Allied Industrial Workers of America (AIW) was a labor union representing industrial workers in the United States.

The union dated its origins to August 26, 1935, when the United Auto Workers (UAW) was established. As it was associated with the Committee for Industrial Organization (CIO), it was suspended by the American Federation of Labor the following year, and it was expelled in May 1938, but a minority, led by Homer Martin, and representing locals outside the Detroit area, was re-admitted in June 1939. It received a duplicate charter, as the United Automobile Workers of America International Union, recognizing it as the continuation of the union founded in 1935.

In 1955, the union affiliated to the AFL–CIO. The UAW which had been aligned with the CIO also affiliated, and this led the former AFL union to change its name, becoming the AIW the following year. By 1957, it had 80,000 members, and this grew to 90,686 in 1980. However, it lost members throughout the following decade, as industry moved overseas or to areas in the American South where the union was weaker.

On January 1, 1994, the union merged into the United Paperworkers International Union.

== Presidents ==
1935: Francis Dillon
1936: Homer Martin
1940: Irving Carey
1943: Lester Washburn
1954: George Grisham
1954: Earl Heaton
1957: Carl W. Griepentrog
1970: Gilbert Jewell
1975: Dominick D'Ambrosio
1991: Nick Serraglio
