= United Cement, Lime and Gypsum Workers' International Union =

The United Cement, Lime and Gypsum Workers' International Union (UCLG) was a labor union representing workers involved in processing building supplies in the United States and Canada.

The union was established in 1936, as the National Council of United Cement Workers. In 1939, it was chartered by the American Federation of Labor as the UCLG. From 1955, it was affiliated to the AFL–CIO, and by 1957, it had 40,000 members, declining to 36,800 members by 1980.

On April 1, 1984, the union merged into the International Brotherhood of Boilermakers, Iron Ship Builders, Blacksmiths, Forgers and Helpers.

== Presidents ==
1936: William Schoenberg
1954: Felix C. Jones
1970: Thomas F. Miechur
