= International Plate Printers, Die Stampers and Engravers Union of North America =

North American labor union

IPPDS&E of NA
- Founded: 1893
- Headquarters: Fort Worth, Texas
- Location: United States of America, Canada
- Affiliations: AFL–CIO, CLC

The International Plate Printers, Die Stampers and Engravers Union of North America is a North American labor union, one of the constituent members of the Department for Professional Employees of the AFL–CIO; and of the Canadian Labour Congress, founded in 1893. It is the result of a number of mergers of labor unions, and is headquartered in Silver Spring, Maryland

== History ==
The union was founded in 1893 in Boston, as the National Steel and Copper Plate Printers' Union of the United States. It was chartered by the American Federation of Labor on July 2, 1898. In 1901, it changed its name to the International Steel and Copper Plate Printers of North America, to include members in Canada. It became the International Plate Printers and Die Stampers' Union of North America in 1921.

In 1925, the union absorbed the International Steel and Copper Plate Engravers' League, adopting its current name in 1930. After the merger, it had 1,000 members. By 1980, the union's membership had fallen to 400.
