= Journeymen Stonecutters' Association of North America =

The Journeymen Stonecutters' Association of North America (JSANA) was a labor union representing workers involved in cutting and shaping stone for construction in the United States and Canada.

The union was founded on December 5, 1887 at a conference in Chicago. Stonecutters were one of the first trades to establish a national union in the United States. Early on, the stonecutters union advocated against the use of planers, a stonecutting device, and launched several strikes to limit the use of planers in stonecutting.

The union achieved a maximum eight hour day in 1904, the first industry to do so. In 1907, it was chartered by the American Federation of Labor (AFL), and in 1915 it absorbed the New York Stone Cutters' Society and the Architectural Sculptors' and Carvers' Association of New York. By 1925, it had 5,075 members.

The union affiliated to the new AFL-CIO in 1955, but by 1957, its membership had fallen to just 1,900. On February 19, 1968, it merged into the Laborers' International Union of North America.

== See also ==
- Laborers' International Union of North America
- American Federation of Labor
- AFL–CIO
- Eight-hour day
- Stone carving
- Labor union
