= International Glove Workers' Union of America =

The International Glove Workers' Union of America (IGWUA) was a labor union representing workers involved in making gloves in the United States and Canada.

The union was founded in Washington, D.C., on 17 December 1902, to represent leather and kid glove makers. On 23 December, it received a charter from the American Federation of Labor (AFL), which expanded its remit to also cover makers of woollen gloves and mittens. With the growth of the manufacture of canvas gloves, the Union began representing those workers as well. However, by 1926, it had only 300 members.

In 1937, several locals based in New York City split from the union and joined the Congress of Industrial Organizations, the experience leading the AFL to give the remaining majority of the union a new charter. This union transferred to the AFL–CIO on its formation, and by 1957, it had grown to 3,100 members. On 20 November 1961, it merged into the Amalgamated Clothing Workers of America.

== Presidents ==
1913: Agnes Nestor
1915:
1930s: Thomas Durian
1950s: Joseph C. Goodfellow
