= United Wall Paper Craftsmen of North America =

The United Wall Paper Craftsmen of North America (UWPC) was a labor union representing wallpaper cutters and printers in the United States and Canada.

The union was founded on June 29, 1923, when the National Print Cutters' Association of America merged with the National Association of Machine Printers and Color Mixers, to form the United Wall Paper Crafts of North America. Like both its predecessors, it was chartered by the American Federation of Labor. In 1926, the union had only 800 members.

In 1937, the union adopted its final name. From 1955, it was affiliated to the AFL–CIO, and by 1957, its membership had grown to 1,500. On April 29, 1958, it merged into the International Brotherhood of Pulp, Sulphite, and Paper Mill Workers.
