= Distillery, Wine and Allied Workers' International Union =

The Distillery, Wine and Allied Workers' International Union (DWAW) was a labor union representing workers involved in making alcoholic drinks in the United States.

== History ==
The union was founded in 1940 as the Distillery, Rectifying and Wine Workers' International Union, and was chartered by the American Federation of Labor on December 20. It transferred to the new AFL-CIO in 1955, and by 1957, it had 25,000 members.

In 1963, the union renamed itself as the Distillery, Rectifying, Wine and Allied Workers' International Union of America, becoming the DWAW in 1978. By 1980, the union's membership had risen slightly, to 26,600. On October 11, 1995, it merged into the United Food and Commercial Workers' International Union.

== Presidents ==
1940: Joseph O'Neil
1958: Mort Brandenburg
1974: George Oneto
1985: George Orlando
