= International Association of Cleaning and Dye House Workers =

The International Association of Cleaning and Dye House Workers (CDHW) was a labor union representing workers in laundries and the dyeing industry in the United States.

The union was founded and chartered by the American Federation of Labor on January 21, 1937. By 1953, it had 20,000 members.

The union transferred to the new AFL-CIO in 1955. In 1956, it merged into the Laundry Workers' International Union, which changed its name to the "Laundry, Cleaning and Dye House Workers' International Union". This merger occurred without the consent of the AFL-CIO.
