= Aluminum, Brick and Glass Workers' International Union =

Labor union

The Aluminum, Brick and Glass Workers' International Union (ABG) was a labor union representing workers in several industries in the United States and Canada.

The union was founded on August 5, 1981, as the Aluminum, Brick and Clay Workers' International Union, when the Aluminum Workers' International Union merged with the United Brick and Clay Workers of America. Like both its predecessors, it was chartered by the AFL–CIO.

On September 1, 1982, the union absorbed the United Glass and Ceramics Workers of North America, and adopted its final name. By 1996, the union had about 40,000 members. On December 17, 1996, it merged into the United Steelworkers of America.

== Presidents ==
1981: Lawrence Holley
1986: Ernie LaBaff
