= International Union of Journeymen and Allied Trades =

IUJAT
- International Union of Journeymen and Allied Trades
- Founded: April 27, 1874
- Headquarters: 93 Lake Avenue, Suite 103; Danbury, CT 06810
- Location: United States
- Members: 73,437 (2021)
- Key people: Jonathan Ames (President) Steven R. Elliott, Sr. (Former President)
- Website: www.iujat.org

The International Union of Journeymen and Allied Trades (IUJAT) is a general union in the United States, with a history as a labor union representing farriers.

The union was founded on April 27, 1874, as the Journeymen Horseshoers' National Union of the United States of America. In 1893, it was chartered by the American Federation of Labor, and also extended its remit to Canada, becoming the International Union of Journeymen Horseshoers of the United States and Canada. By 1925, it had about 2,000 members, but this figure fell to only 243 members in 1953.

In 1955, the union transferred to the new AFL-CIO, surviving for many years with a small membership – as of 1980, it had 400 members. By 1988, it was the second-smallest union affiliated to the AFL-CIO, and offered little support for members other than a $3,000 death benefit. In 2002, with membership down to just 81, mostly working at racetracks, the union became part of the United Steelworkers (USW).

In 2003, the union became the IUJAT, and attracted affiliations from several larger, independent unions The federation approved the name change, but decided that the previous adherence to the USW meant its charter had gone out of existence. The newly independent IUJAT retained its new members, and by 2021 had around 80,000 members, mostly organized in the United Service Workers' Union, National Organization of Industrial Trade Unions, United Public Service Employees' Union, and Home Healthcare Workers of America. The union was the fastest growing union in New York City in 2023

Connor Shaw was hired by the union as the Union's Political Director and has been instrumental in passing pro-worker bills in New Jersey and New York. Shaw and the Union have been the leading advocates for bills that have increased wages in the para-transit, automotive and home health care industry since 2017.

== See also ==
- Roady Kenehan, leader from 1890 to 1910
