= American Federation of Grain Millers =

Trade union

The American Federation of Grain Millers (AFGM) was a labor union representing workers in the milling trade in the United States.

== History ==
The union's origins lay in the National Council of Grain Processors, established in 1936 on the initiative of the American Federation of Labor. In 1941, it was renamed as the American Federation of Grain Processors, then on July 26, 1948 it was chartered as the AFGM.

In 1955, the union transferred to the new AFL-CIO, and by 1957, it had 39,000 members. By 1980, its membership had fallen slightly, to 35,000. On January 1, 1999, it merged with the Bakery, Confectionery and Tobacco Workers' International Union, which renamed itself as the "Bakery, Confectionery, Tobacco Workers and Grain Millers' International Union".

== Leadership ==
=== Presidents ===
1936: William Schoenberg
1936: Meyer Lew
1940: Sam Ming
1960: Roy Wellborn
1979: Frank T. Hoese
1983: Robert W. Willis
1991: Larry R. Jackson

=== Secretary-Treasurers ===
1940: Bill Yunkers
1946: Harold Schneider
1971: Wayne Strader
1972: Harold Tevis
1977: Joseph T. Smisek
1983: Larry R. Jackson
1991: Howard W. Roe
1995: Larry D. Barber
