= Aluminum Workers' International Union =

Labor union

The Aluminum Workers' International Union (AWIU) was a labor union representing metal workers in the United States.

The union's origins lay in Local 18356, established on August 1, 1933, by Alcoa workers in the Allegheny Valley. The local argued that the American Federation of Labor (AFL) should charter it as an industrial union for workers in the industry. The AFL was unwilling to do so, but compromised in May 1934 by founding the Aluminum Workers' Council. Local 18356 later transferred to the Congress of Industrial Organizations, becoming part of the rival Aluminum Workers of America, but the council remained in existence.

The council was chartered by the AFL on February 26, 1953, as the AWIU. In 1955, it affiliated to the new AFL–CIO, and in 1957, it had 24,000 members. By 1980, its membership had grown to 27,000. On August 5, 1981, it merged with the United Brick and Clay Workers of America, to form the Aluminum, Brick and Glass Workers' International Union.

== Presidents ==
1953: Eddie Stahl
1967: Henry Olsen
1973: Vernon E. Kelly
1977: Lawrence Holley
