= United Brick and Clay Workers of America =

Trade union

The United Brick and Clay Workers of America (UBCWA) was a labor union representing brickmakers, clay and terracotta workers and clay miners in the United States.

The union was founded on May 18, 1894, to represent brickmakers. In 1896, it was chartered by the American Federation of Labor as the National Brick Makers' Alliance. In 1901, it absorbed several smaller unions and became the International Brick, Tile and Terra Cotta Workers' Alliance. In 1913, a group split away, and soon formed the United Brick and Clay Workers of America. This rejoined in 1917, and the original union adopted the name of its former breakaway.

By 1953, the union had 23,000 members. It affiliated to the AFL–CIO in 1955, but by 1980 its membership had fallen to 15,000. On August 5, 1981, it merged with the Aluminum Workers' International Union, to form the Aluminum, Brick and Clay Workers' International Union.

== Presidents ==
Frank Butterworth
1916: Frank Kasten
1946: Harold R. Flegal
1961: William L. Griffith
1967: Paul Pelfrey
1970: Roy L. Brown
