= Window Glass Cutters' League of America =

American labor union for flat glass workers

The Window Glass Cutters' League of America (WCGLA) was a labor union representing workers involved in making flat glass in the United States.

The union was founded in on December 6, 1917, in Charleston, West Virginia, as the Cutters' League. It soon renamed itself as the WCGLA, and relocated its headquarters to Columbus, Ohio. It was chartered by the American Federation of Labor on April 14, 1928.

In 1930, the union absorbed the Window Glass Cutters' and Flatteners' Association of America, while in 1933, the Window Glass Cutters' and Flatteners' Protective Association of America merged in.

From 1955, the union was affiliated to the AFL–CIO, and as of 1957, it had 1,600 members. On August 1, 1975, it merged into the Glass Bottle Blowers' Association.

== Presidents ==
Glen McCabe
Howard P. Chester
Arthur L. Markham
