= International Alliance of Bill Posters, Billers and Distributors of the United States and Canada =

Labor union

The International Alliance of Bill Posters, Billers and Distributors of the United States and Canada (BPBD) was a labor union representing workers involved in the advertising industry.

The union was founded and chartered by the American Federation of Labor on January 5, 1903. Originally named the National Alliance of Bill Posters and Billers of America, in 1908 it became the International Alliance of Bill Posters and Billers of America. By 1925, it had 6,000 members.

The union affiliated to the new AFL-CIO in 1955, and adopted its final name, but by 1957 its membership had fallen to 1,600. It continued to drop, and by 1969, the union had only 50 members. On October 31, 1971, the union dissolved.
