= Stove, Furnace and Allied Appliance Workers' International Union of North America =

Labor Union

The Stove, Furnace and Allied Appliance Workers' International Union of North America (SFAW) was a labor union representing workers involved in fitting heating equipment in the United States and Canada.

== History ==
The union was founded on December 29, 1892, in Quincy, Illinois, as the International Stove Mounters' Union. In 1894, it was chartered by the American Federation of Labor. It underwent frequent name changes, its longest name being the Stove Mounters', Steel Range Workers' and Pattern Fitters' and Filers' International Union of North America. It became the Stove Mounters' International Union of North America in 1902, and although it became the Stove Mounters' and Steel Range Workers' Union of North America in 1904, it returned to its the shorter name in 1910.

By 1925, the union had about 1,600 members. It transferred to the new AFL-CIO in 1955, and by 1957, its membership had grown to 9,183. The union adopted its final name in 1962. By 1980, membership had fallen to 6,400, and on October 1, 1994, it merged into the International Brotherhood of Boilermakers.

== Presidents ==
1892: H. P. Oberling
1895: James McGinn
1896: Thomas H. Devenish
1898: George S. Schwab
1900: J. H. Kaefer
1901: James A. Davis
1902: John Tierney
1903: Allen J. Studholme
1904: D. W. Ottinger
1910: Frank Grimshaw
1913: Walter L. Funderburk
1929: Edward W. Kaiser
1940s: Joseph Lewis
James M. Roberts
1974: George E. Pierson
1980s: Thomas B. Kemme
