= Metal Polishers', Buffers', Platers' and Allied Workers' International Union =

North American labor union

The Metal Polishers', Buffers', Platers' and Allied Workers' International Union (MPBP) was a labor union representing metal workers in the United States and Canada.

The union was founded in 1892, as the Metal Polishers', Buffers' and Platers' International Union of North America, a split from the International Brotherhood of Brass Workers. It was chartered by the American Federation of Labor, but the Brass Workers remained a significant force in the industry, particularly after 1895, when it was joined by many metal polishers formerly organized in the Knights of Labor Trades Assembly 252.

On July 2, 1896, the union absorbed the Brass Workers, renaming itself as the Metal Polishers', Buffers', Platers' and Brass Workers' Union of North America, adding "International" to its name in 1899. In 1902, the silver workers' union merged in, and the union's name was again lengthened, to become the Metal Polishers', Buffers', Platers', Brass Molders', and Brass and Silver Workers' International Union of North America. However, brass molders were transferred to the International Molders' Union of North America in 1907, and brass workers who used lathes were then transferred to the International Association of Machinists. In 1917, the union transferred its silver workers to the International Jewelry Workers' Union, but gained relevant members of the Pocket Knife Blade Grinders' and Finishers' National Union. Having narrowed its focus, it renamed itself as the Metal Polishers' International Union.

The union had 9,000 members in 1925. In 1935, it became the Metal Polishers', Buffers', Platers' and Helpers' International Union, and in 1955, it transferred to the new AFL-CIO. By 1957, its membership had grown to 25,000, but by 1980 it had fallen back to 10,000. It adopted its final name in 1971. On December 10, 1996, the union merged into the International Brotherhood of Boilermakers.

== Presidents ==
1892: Timothy M. Daly
1893:
1894: Henry J. Eikhoff
1895: Timothy M. Daly
1896: Edward J. Lynch
1902:
1903: Edward J. Lynch
1905: Adelbert Grout
1909: Timothy M. Daly
1915: Walter W. Britton
1943: Ray Kelsay
c.1950: Ray Muehlhoffer
c.1960: Jim Siebert
1984: Glenn Holt
