= International Union of Allied Novelty and Production Workers =

Labor union in the US and Canada

IUANPW
- International Union of Allied, Novelty and Production Workers (IUANPW)
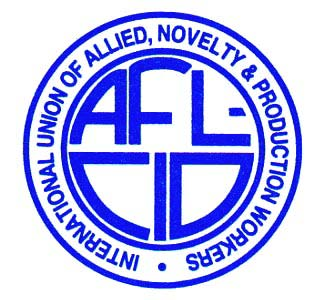
- Headquarters: 245 Fencl Lane Hillside, Illinois 60162
- Location: United States, Canada
- Members: 18,000
- Key people: Mark Spano, President; Benny Castro, Secretary-Treasurer
- Affiliations: AFL–CIO
- Website: iuanpw.org

The International Union of Allied Novelty and Production Workers (IUANPW) is an American labor union representing over 18,000 employees. Traditionally it organized workers at toy factories but, as that industry moved overseas, it evolved into a general union in a variety of industries. The union is affiliated with the AFL–CIO.

== History ==
The IUANPW was established in the 1940s. The union was originally named the International Union of Dolls, Toys, Playthings, Novelties and Allied Products of the United States and Canada. The name was changed to the International Union of Allied, Novelty and Production Workers in the late 1970s as toy manufacturing was largely shipped overseas.

During the 1990s, the union struggled with infiltration by organized crime. Union officer John Serpico from the Chicago Outfit was convicted of fraud with pension funds, two members of the Colombo crime family were convicted under the RICO Act for taking bribes from an employer on behalf of the union, and union attorney Sanford Pollack was convicted of both racketeering and arson to conceal evidence.

In 2021, the union led an unsuccessful organizing drive for employees of cookie maker Tate's Bake Shop where the employer was accused of threatening to deport undocumented workers.

Today the IUANPW represents a wide array of job classifications at numerous employers in industries including general manufacturing, construction, food production, transportation, and automotive fields. Members make the Weber grill.

== Structure ==
A majority of the membership is concentrated in the Chicago and New York City metro areas but the union currently represents workers in 11 states and Ontario, Canada. It is especially active with the Chicago Federation of Labor.

=== Divisions ===
- Central States Joint Board, Illinois
  - Local 18, Plastic Workers, web site
  - Local 30, Chemical & Production Workers, web site
- Eastern States Joint Board, New York
  - Local 22, Production & Service Workers
  - Local 298, Amalgamated Workers, web site
  - Local 811, Worker Justice, web site

=== Executive board ===
- President: Mark Spano
- Secretary-Treasurer: Benny Castro
- First Vice-President: Joseph Giovinco
- Second Vice-President: Anthony Iori
- Third Vice-President: Nicole Jean-Charles
- Fourth Vice-President: Angel Febus
- Executive Board Member: Phil Sitkowski
- Executive Board Member: Cosmo Lubrano
- Executive Board Member: Carl Whaling
