= American Federation of Labor =

Labor organization from 1886 to 1955

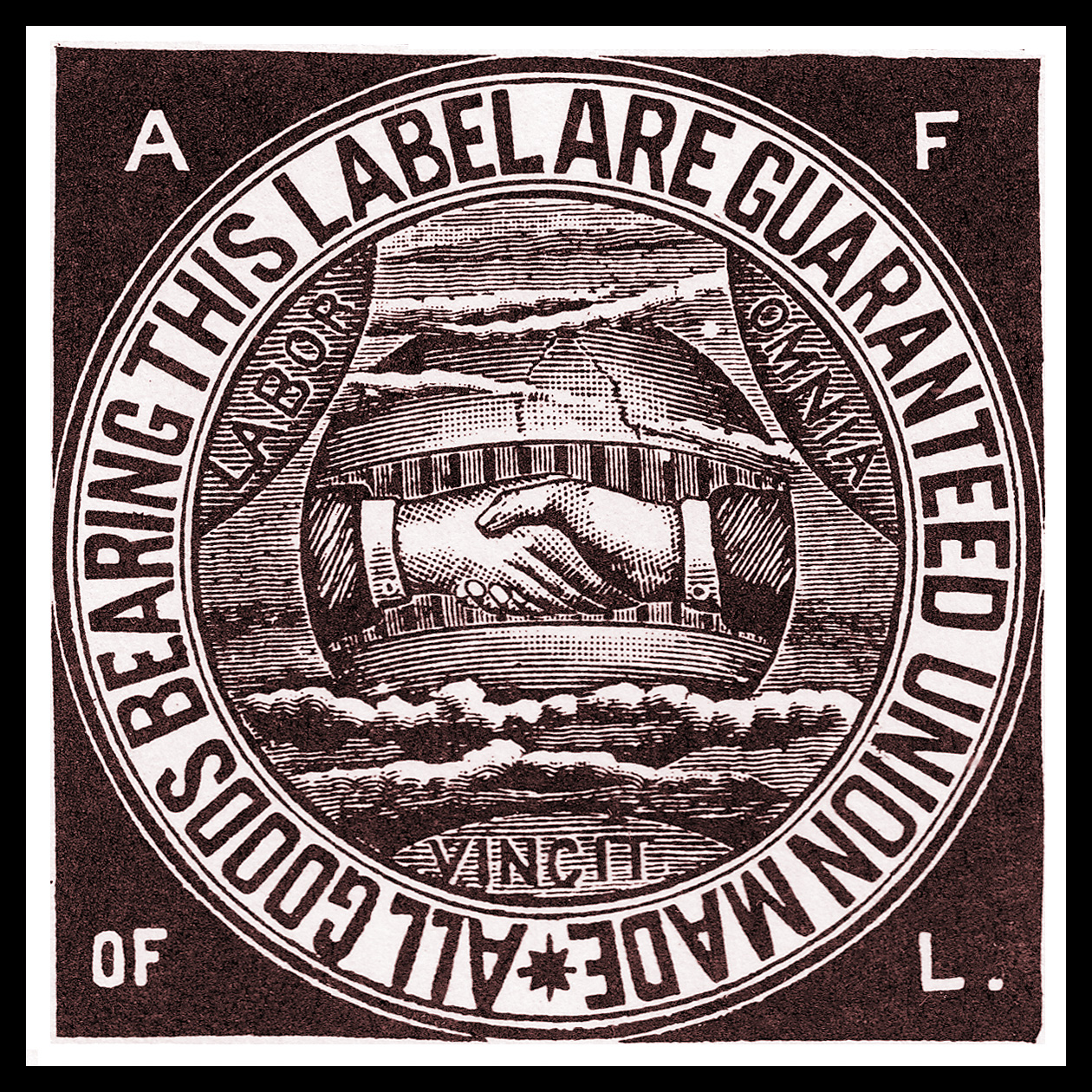
- Abbreviation: A.F. of L.
- Predecessor: Federation of Organized Trades and Labor Unions
- Merged into: AFL-CIO
- Founded: December 8, 1886
- Dissolved: December 4, 1955
- Headquarters: New York City; later Washington, D.C.
- Location: United States
- Key people: Samuel Gompers; John McBride; William Green; George Meany

The American Federation of Labor (A.F. of L.) was a national federation of labor unions in the United States that continues today as the AFL-CIO. It was founded in Columbus, Ohio, in 1886 by an alliance of craft unions eager to provide mutual support and disappointed in the Knights of Labor. Samuel Gompers was elected the full-time president at its founding convention and was re-elected every year except one until his death in 1924. He became the major spokesperson for the union movement.

The A.F. of L. was the largest union grouping, even after the creation of the Congress of Industrial Organizations (CIO) by unions that were expelled by the A.F. of L. in 1935. The A.F. of L. was founded and dominated by craft unions, especially in the building trades. In the late 1930s, craft affiliates expanded by organizing on an industrial union basis to meet the challenge from the CIO. The A.F. of L. and the CIO competed bitterly in the late 1930s but then cooperated during World War II and afterward. In 1955, the two merged to create the AFL-CIO, which has comprised the longest lasting and most influential labor federation in the United States to this day.

== Organizational history ==
=== Origins ===
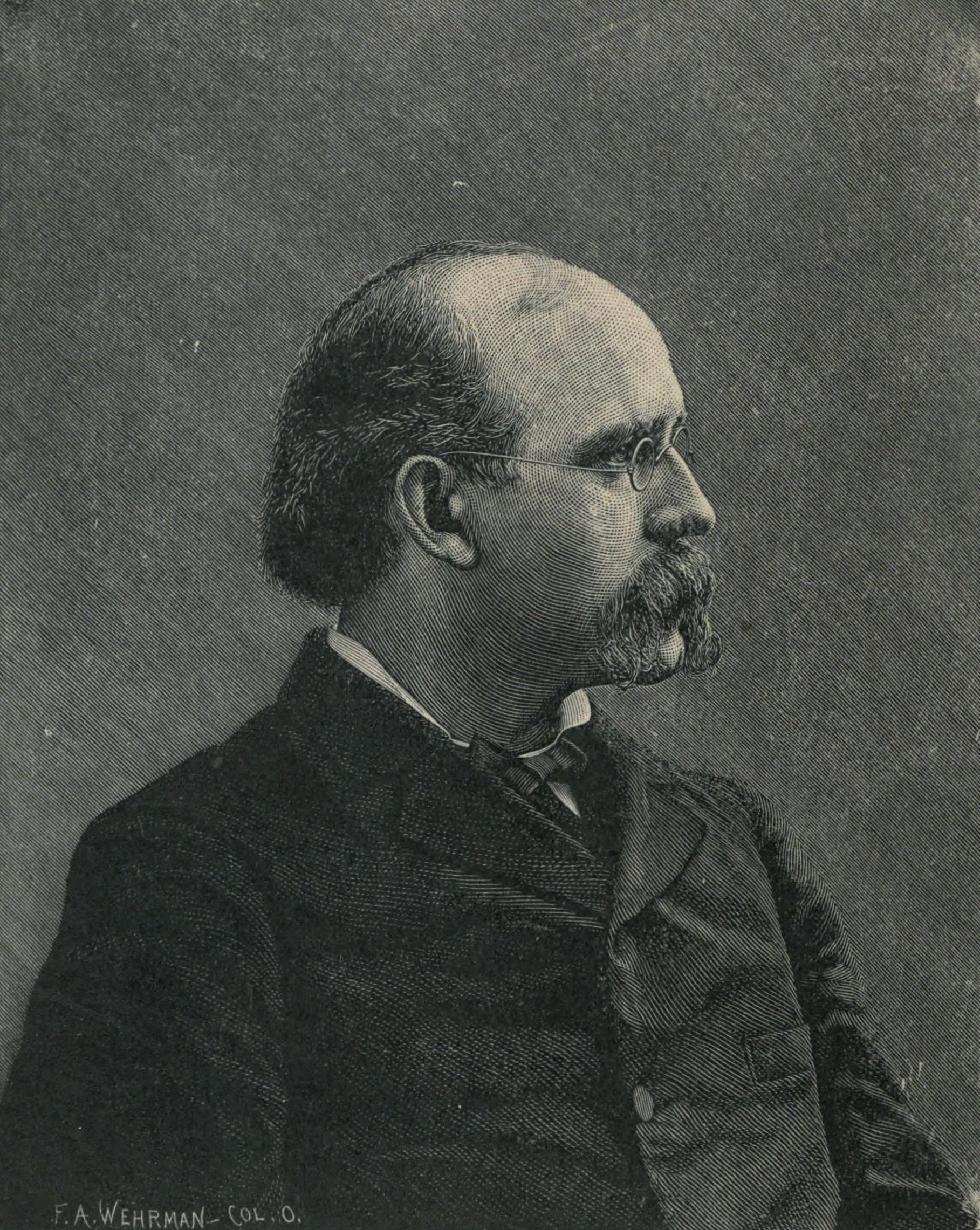
Terence Powderly, Grand Master Workman of the Knights of Labor, whose refusal to negotiate with craft unions led to formation of the AFL

The American Federation of Labor (A.F. of L.) was organized as an association of trade unions in 1886. The organization emerged from a dispute with the Knights of Labor (K of L) organization, in which the leadership of that organization solicited locals of various craft unions to withdraw from their International organizations and to affiliate with the K of L directly, an action which would have moved funds from the various unions to the K of L. The Federation of Organized Trades and Labor Unions also merged into what would become the American Federation of Labor.

One of the organizations embroiled in this controversy was the Cigar Makers' International Union (CMIU), a group subject to competition from a dual union, a rival "Progressive Cigarmakers' Union", organized by members suspended or expelled by the CMIU. The two cigar unions competed with one another in signing contracts with various cigar manufacturers, who were at this same time combining themselves into manufacturers' associations of their own in New York City, Detroit, Cincinnati, Chicago, and Milwaukee.

In January 1886, the Cigar Manufacturers' Association of New York City announced a 20 percent wage cut in factories around the city. The Cigar Makers' International Union refused to accept the cut and 6,000 of its members in 19 factories were locked out by the owners. A strike lasting four weeks ensued. Just when it appeared that the strike might be won, the New York District Assembly of the Knights of Labor leaped into the breach, offering to settle with the 19 factories at a lower wage scale than that proposed by the CMIU, so long as only the Progressive Cigarmakers' Union was employed.

The leadership of the CMIU was enraged and demanded that the New York District Assembly be investigated and punished by the national officials of the Knights of Labor. The committee of investigation was controlled by individuals friendly to the New York District Assembly, however, and the latter was exonerated. The American Federation of Labor was thus originally formed as an alliance of craft unions outside the Knights of Labor as a means of defending themselves against this and similar incursions.

On April 25, 1886, a circular letter was issued by Adolph Strasser of the Cigar Makers and P. J. McGuire of the Carpenters, addressed to all national trade unions and calling for their attendance of a conference in Philadelphia on May 18. The call stated that an element of the Knights of Labor was doing "malicious work" and causing "incalculable mischief by arousing antagonisms and dissensions in the labor movement." The call was signed by Strasser and McGuire, along with representatives of the Granite Cutters, the Iron Molders, and the secretary of the Federation of Trades of North America, a forerunner of the A.F. of L. founded in 1881.

Forty-three invitations were mailed, which drew the attendance of 20 delegates and letters of approval from 12 other unions. At this preliminary gathering, held in Donaldson Hall on the corner of Broad and Filbert Streets, the K of L was charged with conspiring with anti-union bosses to provide labor at below going union rates and with making use of individuals who had crossed picket lines or defaulted on payment of union dues. The body authored a "treaty" to be presented to the forthcoming May 24, 1886, convention of the Knights of Labor, which demanded that the K of L cease attempting to organize members of International Unions into its own assemblies without permission of the unions involved and that K of L organizers violating this provision should suffer immediate suspension.

For its part, the Knights of Labor considered the demand for the parcelling of the labor movement into narrow craft-based fiefdoms to be anathema, a violation of the principle of solidarity of all workers across craft lines. Negotiations with the dissident craft unions were nipped in the bud by the governing General Assembly of the K of L, however, with the organization's Grand Master Workman, Terence V. Powderly refusing to enter into serious discussions on the matter. The actions of the New York District Assembly of the K of L were upheld.

=== Formation and early years ===
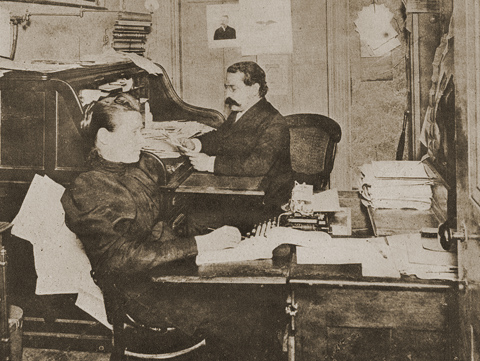
Samuel Gompers in the office of the American Federation of Labor, 1887

Convinced that no accommodation with the leadership of the Knights of Labor was possible, the heads of the five labor organizations which issued the call for the April 1886 conference issued a new call for a convention to be held December 8, 1886, in Columbus, Ohio, in order to construct "an American federation of alliance of all national and international trade unions." Forty-two delegates representing 13 national unions and various other local labor organizations responded to the call, agreeing to form themselves into an American Federation of Labor.

Revenue for the new organization was to be raised on the basis of a "per-capita tax" of its member organizations, set at the rate of one-half cent per member per month (i.e. six cents per year, equal to $2.15 today). Governance of the organization was to be by annual conventions, with one delegate allocated for every 4,000 members of each affiliated union. The founding convention voted to make the President of the new federation a full-time official at a salary of $1,000 per year (equal to $35,833 today), and Samuel Gompers of the Cigar Makers' International Union was elected to the position. Gompers would ultimately be re-elected to the position by annual conventions of the organization for every year save one until his death nearly four decades later.

Although the founding convention of the A.F. of L. had authorized the establishment of a publication for the new organization, Gompers made use of the existing labor press to generate support for the position of the craft unions against the Knights of Labor. Powerful opinion-makers of the American labor movement such as the Philadelphia Tocsin, Haverhill Labor, the Brooklyn Labor Press, and the Denver Labor Enquirer granted Gompers space in their pages, in which he made the case for the unions against the attacks of employers, "all too often aided by the K of L."

Headway was made in the form of endorsement by various local labor bodies. Some assemblies of the K of L supported the Cigar Makers' position and departed the organization: in Baltimore, 30 locals left the organization, while the membership of the Knights in Chicago fell from 25,000 in 1886 to just 3,500 in 1887. Factional warfare broke out in the K of L, with Terence Powderly blaming the organization's travails on "radicals" in its ranks, while those opposing Powderly called for an end to what they perceived as "autocratic leadership".

In the face of the steady disintegration of its rival, the fledgling American Federation of Labor struggled to maintain itself, with the group showing very slow and incremental growth in its first years, only cracking the 250,000 member mark in 1892. The group from the outset concentrated upon the income and working conditions of its membership as its almost sole focus. The A.F. of L.'s founding convention declaring "higher wages and a shorter workday" to be "preliminary steps toward great and accompanying improvements in the condition of the working people." Participation in partisan politics was avoided as inherently divisive, and the group's constitution was structured to prevent the admission of political parties as affiliates.

This fundamentally conservative "pure and simple" approach limited the A.F. of L. to matters pertaining to working conditions and rates of pay, relegating political goals to its allies in the political sphere. The Federation favored pursuit of workers' immediate demands rather than challenging the property rights of owners, and took a pragmatic view of politics which favored tactical support for particular politicians over formation of a party devoted to workers' interests. The A.F. of L.'s leadership believed the expansion of the capitalist system was seen as the path to betterment of labor, an orientation making it possible for the A.F. of L. to present itself as what one historian has called "the conservative alternative to working class radicalism".

=== Early 20th century ===
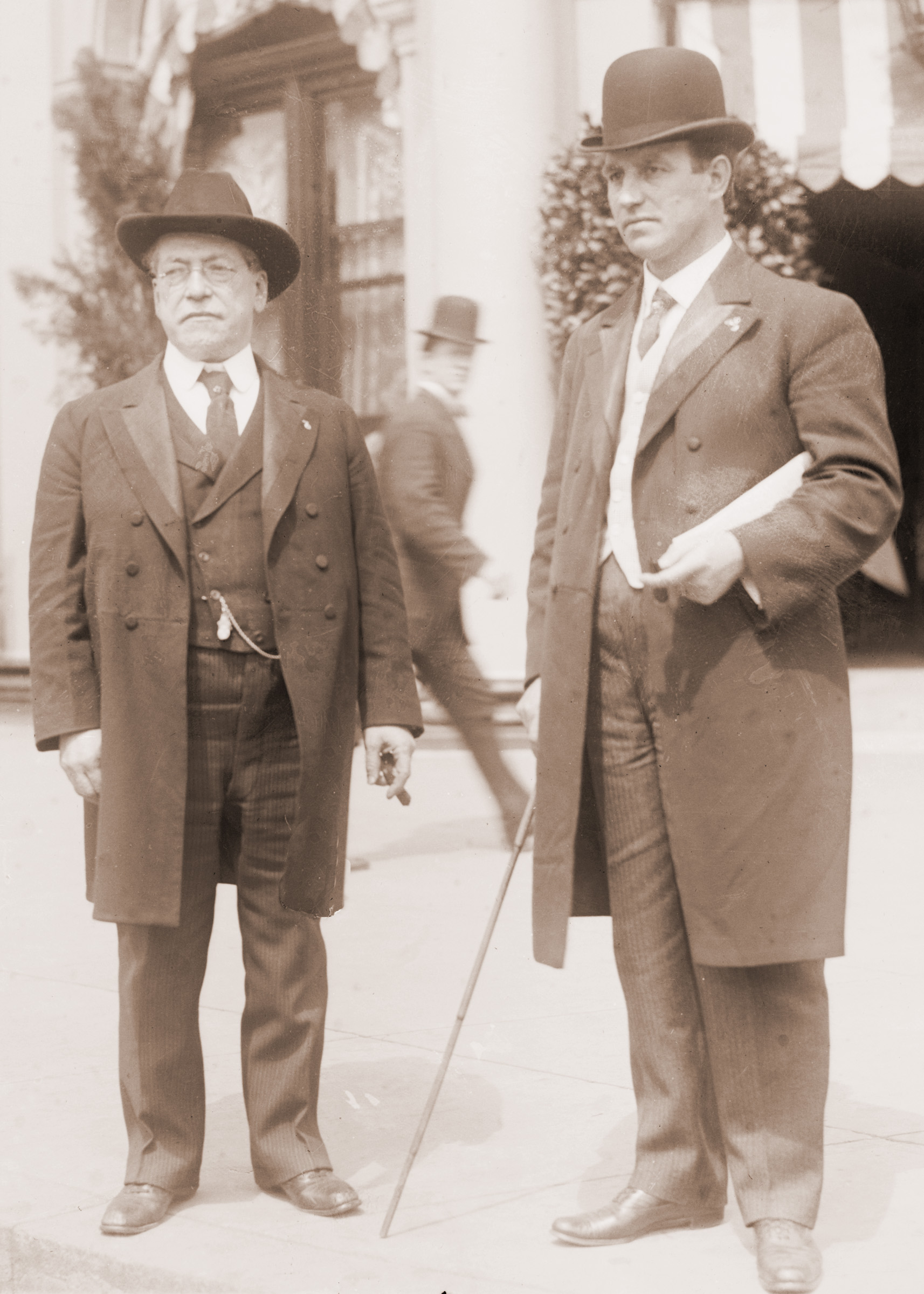
Samuel Gompers with John Mitchell of the United Mine Workers of America

The A.F. of L. faced its first major reversal when employers launched an open shop movement in 1903, designed to drive unions out of construction, mining, longshore and other industries. Membership in the A.F. of L.'s affiliated unions declined between 1904 and 1914 in the face of this concerted anti-union drive, which made effective use of legal injunctions against strikes, court rulings given force when backed with the armed might of the state. At its November 1907 Convention in Norfolk, Virginia, the A.F. of L. founded the future North America's Building Trades Unions (NABTU) as its Department of Building Trades.

Ever the pragmatist, Gompers argued that labor should "reward its friends and punish its enemies" in both major parties. However, in the 1900s (decade), the two parties began to realign, with the main faction of the Republican Party coming to identify with the interests of banks and manufacturers, while a substantial portion of the rival Democratic Party took a more labor-friendly position. While not precluding its members from belonging to the Socialist Party or working with its members, the A.F. of L. traditionally refused to pursue the tactic of independent political action by the workers in the form of the existing Socialist Party or the establishment of a new labor party. After 1908, the organization's tie to the Democratic party grew increasingly strong.

==== National Civic Federation ====
Some unions within the A.F. of L. helped form and participated in the National Civic Federation. The National Civic Federation was formed by several progressive employers who sought to avoid labor disputes by fostering collective bargaining and "responsible" unionism.

Major Republican leaders, such as President William McKinley and Senator Mark Hanna, made pro-labor statements. According to Gwendolyn Mink:

The escalation in labor disruptions and the expansion in union membership encouraged business leaders to promote union-employer cooperation in order to rationalize production and maximize efficiency. The AFL was the linchpin of such cooperation. Where AFL unions existed, the AFL could be called upon to manage labor conflict; equally important, the AFL was unlikely to sacrifice its organization to the volatility of industrial unionism.

Labor's participation in the National Civic Federation created internal division within the A.F. of L. The Socialist element who believed the only way to help workers was to remove large industry from private ownership, denounced labor's efforts at cooperation with the capitalists. The A.F. of L. nonetheless continued its association with the group, which declined in importance as the decade of the 1910s drew to a close.

==== Canada ====
By the 1890s, Gompers was planning an international federation of labor, starting with the expansion of A.F. of L. affiliates in Canada, especially Ontario. He helped the Canadian Trades and Labour Congress with money and organizers, and by 1902, the A.F. of L. came to dominate the Canadian union movement.

==== Immigration restriction ====
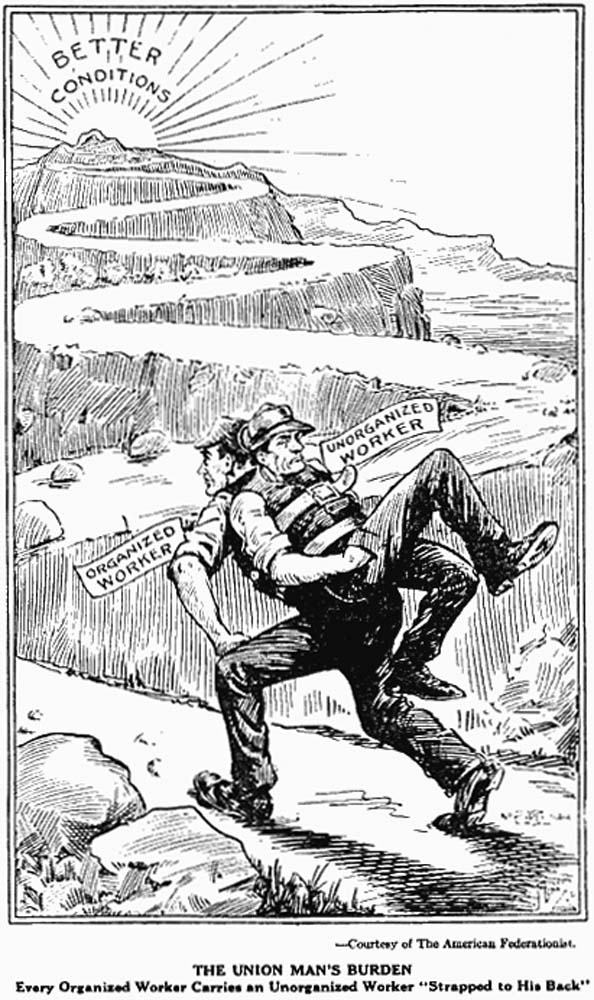
1922 cartoon from the American Federationist. The caption reads: The Union Man's Burden; Every organized worker carries an unorganized worker "strapped to his back".

The A.F. of L. vigorously opposed unrestricted immigration from Europe for moral, cultural, and racial reasons. The issue unified the workers who feared that an influx of new workers would flood the labor market and lower wages. Nativism was not a factor because upwards of half the union members were themselves immigrants or the sons of immigrants from Ireland, Germany and Britain. Nativism was a factor when the A.F. of L. even more strenuously opposed all immigration from Asia because it represented (to its Euro-American members) an alien culture that could not be assimilated into American society. The A.F. of L. intensified its opposition after 1906 and was instrumental in passing immigration restriction bills from the 1890s to the 1920s, such as the 1921 Emergency Quota Act and the Immigration Act of 1924, and seeing that they were strictly enforced.

Mink (1986) concludes that the link between the A.F. of L. and the Democratic Party rested in part on immigration issues, noting the large corporations, which supported the Republicans, wanted more immigration to augment their labor force.

Prohibition gained strength as the German American community came under fire. The A.F. of L. was against prohibition as it was viewed as cultural right of the working class to drink.

==== Coalition against child labor ====
Child labor was an issue on which the A.F. of L. found common ground with middle class reformers who otherwise kept their distance. The A.F. of L. joined campaigns at the state and national level to limit the employment of children under age 14. In 1904 a major national organization emerged, the National Child Labor Committee (NCLC). In state after state reformers launched crusades to pass laws restricting child labor, with the ultimate goals of rescuing young bodies and increasing school attendance. The frustrations included the Supreme Court striking down two national laws as unconstitutional, and weak enforcement of state laws due to the political influence of employers.

=== World War I and after: 1917–1921 ===
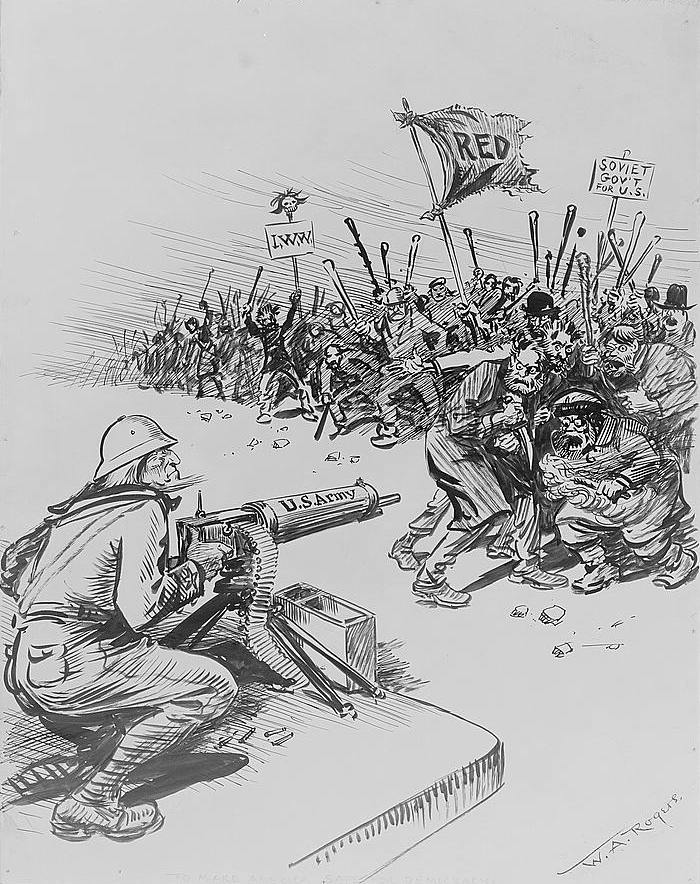
1919 New York Herald cartoon portraying "reds" and "Wobblies" (IWW members) as a violent mob held back by threat of a US Army machine gun

The A.F. of L. and its affiliates were strong supporters of the war effort. The risk of disruptions to war production by labor radicals provided the A.F. of L. political leverage to gain recognition and mediation of labor disputes, often in favor of improvements for workers. The A.F. of L. unions avoided strikes in favor of arbitration. Wages soared as near-full employment was reached at the height of the war. The A.F. of L. unions strongly encouraged young men to enlist in the military, and fiercely opposed efforts to reduce recruiting and slow war production by pacifists, the anti-war Industrial Workers of the World (IWW) and the radical faction of Socialists. To keep factories running smoothly, President Wilson established the National War Labor Board in 1918, which forced management to negotiate with existing unions. Wilson also appointed A.F. of L. president Gompers to the powerful Council of National Defense, where he set up the War Committee on Labor.

The A. F. of L. was strongly committed to the national war aims and cooperated closely with Washington. It used the opportunity to grow rapidly. It worked out an informal agreement with the United States government, in which the A.F. of L. would coordinate with the government both to support the war effort and to join "into an alliance to crush radical labor groups" that opposed the war effort, especially the Industrial Workers of the World and Socialist Party of America.

Gompers chaired the wartime Labor Advisory Board. He attended the Paris Peace Conference in 1919 as an official advisor on labor issues.

In 1920, the A.F. of L. petitioned Washington for the release of prisoners who had been convicted under Wartime Emergency Laws. Wilson did not act but President Warren Harding did so.

While 1919 was the first year of peace after the end of the First World War, it was a year of great turmoil in the US labor movement. A.F. of L. membership soared to 2.4 million in 1917 and 4.1 million at the end of 1919. The A.F. of L. unions tried to make their gains permanent and called a series of major strikes in meat, steel, and other industries. The strikes ultimately failed. This was coupled with the First Red Scare, which feared a workers' revolution in the image of the Russian Revolution in the US. While the Red Scare centered its attacks on more radical unions, such as the IWW, the AFL was also subject to repression from both the government and various vigilante groups such as the American Legion. 1919 was also a decisive year in the AFL's tumultuous relationship to the ever-growing population of black industrial workers, a result of the Great Migration. Due to jobs being taken away from soldiers fighting in Europe and given, largely, to black workers new to the Northern states, many returning white soldiers laid the blame for their economic uncertainty on the black workers. This caused increased racial tension across the country, which, when coupled with the nationalism stoked by the war, led to the Red Summer, a series of outbreaks of mass racial violence that not only targeted black people in general but also organized workers broadly. The AFL did little to aid the black workers trying to hold on to a peaceful existence in the north and did less to protest the increasingly cruel treatment of black workers in the Deep South made painful apparent by the Elaine Massacre. The failure of the AFL to deal with the Red Scare, racial issues, and generally capitalize on the momentum of the militant organizing that dominated the year 1919 after the Seattle General Strike led to a decline in the organization's prestige and respect among workers. This left them open to being ravaged by open shop drives which intensified in the wake of 1919.

=== 1920s ===
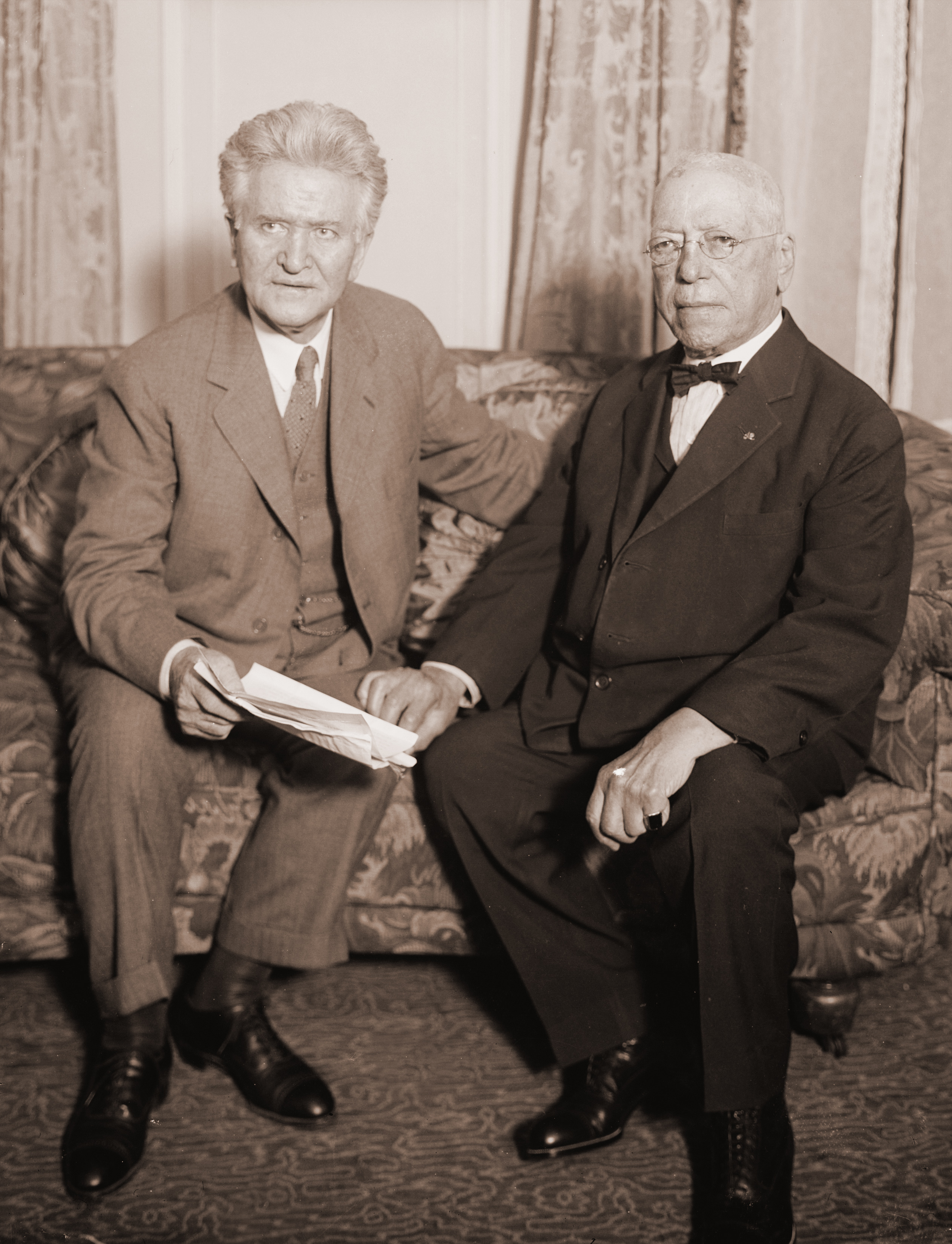
American Federation of Labor head Samuel Gompers (right) endorsed the pro-labor Progressive Presidential candidate Robert M. La Follette in 1924.

In the pro-business environment of the 1920s, business launched a large-scale offensive on behalf of the so-called "open shop", which meant that a person did not have to be a union member to be hired. A.F. of L. unions lost membership steadily until 1933. In 1924, following the death of Samuel Gompers, UMWA member and A.F. of L. vice president William Green became the president of the labor federation.

The organization endorsed pro-labor Progressive candidate Robert M. La Follette in the 1924 presidential election. He only carried his home state of Wisconsin. The campaign failed to establish a permanent independent party closely connected to the labor movement, however, and thereafter the Federation embraced ever more closely the Democratic Party, despite the fact that many union leaders remained Republicans. Herbert Hoover in 1928 won the votes of many Protestant A.F. of L. members.

=== New Deal ===
The Great Depression were hard times for the unions, and membership fell sharply across the country. As the national economy began to recover in 1933, so did union membership. The New Deal of president Franklin D. Roosevelt, a Democrat, strongly favored labor unions. He made sure that relief operations like the Civilian Conservation Corps did not include a training component that would produce skilled workers who would compete with union members in a still glutted market. The major legislation was the National Labor Relations Act of 1935, called the Wagner Act. It greatly strengthened organized unions, especially by weakening the company unions that many workers belonged to. It was to the members advantage to transform a company union into a local of an A.F. of L. union, and thousands did so, dramatically boosting the membership. The Wagner Act also set up to the National Labor Relations Board, which used its powers to rule in favor of unions and against the companies.

In the early 1930s, A.F. of L. president William Green (president, 1924–1952) experimented with an industrial approach to organizing in the automobile and steel industries. The A.F. of L. made forays into industrial unionism by chartering federal labor unions, which would organize across an industry and be chartered by the Federation, not through existing craft unions, guilds, or brotherhoods. As early as 1923, the A.F. of L. had chartered federal labor unions, including six news writer locals that had formerly been part of the International Typographical Union. However, in the 1930s the A.F. of L. began chartering these federal labor unions as an industrial organizing strategy. The dues in these federal labor unions (FLUs) were kept intentionally low to make them more accessible to low paid industrial workers; however, these low dues later allowed the Internationals in the Federation to deny members of FLUs voting membership at conventions. In 1933, Green sent William Collins to Detroit to organize automobile workers into a federal labor union. That same year workers at the Westinghouse plant in East Springfield MA, members of federal labor union 18476, struck for recognition. In 1933, the A.F. of L. received 1,205 applications for charters for federal labor unions, 1006 of which were granted. By 1934, the A.F. of L. had successfully organized 32,500 autoworkers using the federal labor union model. Most of the leadership of the craft union internationals that made up the federation, advocated for the FLU's to be absorbed into existing craft union internationals and for these internationals to have supremacy of jurisdiction. At the 1933 A.F. of L. convention in Washington, DC, John Frey of the Molders and Metal Trades pushed for craft union internationals to have jurisdictional supremacy over the FLU's; the Carpenters headed by William Hutchenson and the IBEW also pushed for FLU's to turn over their members to the authority of the craft internationals between 1933 and 1935. In 1934, one hundred FLUs met separately and demanded that the A.F. of L. continue to issue charters to unions organizing on an industrial basis independent of the existing craft union internationals. In 1935 the FLUs representing autoworkers and rubber workers both held conventions independent of the craft union internationals.

By the 1935 A.F. of L. convention, Green and the advocates of traditional craft unionism faced increasing dissension led by John L. Lewis of the coal miners, Sidney Hillman of the Amalgamated, David Dubinsky of the Garment Workers, Charles Howard of the ITU, Thomas McMahon of the Textile Workers, and Max Zaritsky of the Hat, Cap, and Millinery Workers, in addition to the members of the FLU's themselves. Lewis argued that the A.F.of L. was too heavily oriented toward traditional craftsmen, and was overlooking the opportunity to organize millions of semiskilled workers, especially those in industrial factories that made automobiles, rubber, glass and steel. In 1935 Lewis led the dissenting unions in forming a new Congress for Industrial Organization (CIO) within the A.F. of L. Both the new CIO industrial unions, and the older A.F. of L. crafts unions grew rapidly after 1935. President Franklin D. Roosevelt became a hero to them. He won reelection in a landslide in 1936, and by a closer margin in 1940. Labor unions gave strong support in 1940, compared to very strong support in 1936. The Gallup Poll showed CIO voters declined from 85% in 1935 to 79% in 1940. A.F. of L. voters went from 80% to 71%. Other union members went from 74% to 57%. Blue collar workers who were not union members went 72% to 64%.

=== World War II and merger ===
The A.F. of L. retained close ties to the Democratic machines in big cities through the 1940s. Its membership surged during the war and it held on to most of its new members after wartime legal support for labor was removed. Despite its close connections to many in Congress, the A.F. of L. was not able to block the Taft–Hartley Act in 1947. Also in 1947, the union supported the strike efforts of thousands of switchboard operators by donating thousands of dollars.

In 1955, the A.F. of L. and CIO merged to form the AFL-CIO, headed by George Meany.

== Historical problems ==
=== Racism ===
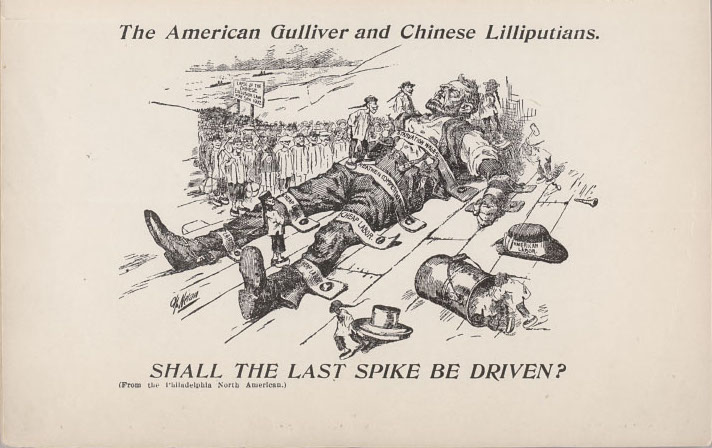
"The American Gulliver and Chinese Lilliputians", from 1901 pamphlet

During its first years, the A.F. of L. admitted nearly anyone. Gompers opened the A.F. of L. to radical and socialist workers and to some semiskilled and unskilled workers. Women, African Americans, and immigrants joined in small numbers. By the 1890s, the Federation had begun to organize only skilled workers in craft unions and became an organization of mostly white men. Although the A.F. of L. preached a policy of egalitarianism in regard to African-American workers, it actively discriminated against them. The A.F. of L. sanctioned the maintenance of segregated locals within its affiliates, particularly in the construction and railroad industries, a practice that often excluded black workers altogether from union membership and thus from employment in organized industries. These practices led prominent labor historian Philip S. Foner to describe the AFL as "Jim Crow Unionism."

In 1901, the A.F. of L. lobbied Congress to reauthorize the 1882 Chinese Exclusion Act, and issued a pamphlet entitled "Some reasons for Chinese Exclusion. Meat vs. Rice. American Manhood against Asiatic Coolieism. Which shall survive?". The A.F. of L. also began one of the first organized labor boycotts when they began putting white stickers on the cigars made by unionized white cigar rollers while simultaneously discouraging consumers from purchasing cigars rolled by Chinese workers. In general, AFL unions preferred native-born workers, discouraged the speaking of any language other than English by its members, and had strict citizenship requirements of the immigrants it did admit to the union for the majority of its history.

=== Sexism ===
In most ways, the A.F. of L.'s treatment of women workers paralleled its policy towards black workers. The A.F. of L. never adopted a strict policy of gender exclusion and, at times, even came out in favor of women's unionism. However, despite such rhetoric, it only half-heartedly supported women's attempts to organize and, more often, took pains to keep women out of unions and the workforce altogether. Only two national unions affiliated with the A.F. of L. at its founding openly included women, and others passed bylaws barring women's membership entirely. The A.F. of L. hired its first female organizer, Mary Kenney O'Sullivan, only in 1892, released her after five months, and it did not replace her or hire another woman national organizer until 1908. Women who organized their own unions were often turned down in bids to join the Federation, and even women who did join unions found them hostile or intentionally inaccessible. Unions often held meetings at night or in bars when women might find it difficult to attend and where they might feel uncomfortable, and male unionists heckled women who tried to speak at meetings.

Generally, the A.F. of L. viewed women workers as competition, strikebreakers, or an unskilled labor reserve that kept wages low. As such, it often opposed women's employment entirely. When it organized women workers, it most often did so to protect men's jobs and earning power, not to improve the conditions, lives, or wages of women workers. In response, most women workers remained outside the labor movement. In 1900, only 3.3% of working women were organized into unions. In 1910, even as the A.F. of L. surged forward in membership, that number had dipped to 1.5%. It improved to 6.6% over the next decade, but women remained mostly outside of unions and practically invisible inside of them into the mid-1920s.

Attitudes gradually changed within the A.F. of L. by the pressure of organized female workers. Female-domination began to emerge in the first two decades of the 20th century, including particularly the International Ladies Garment Workers' Union. Women organized independent locals among New York hat makers, in the Chicago stockyards, and among Jewish and Italian waist makers, to name only three examples. Through the efforts of middle-class reformers and activists, often of the Women's Trade Union League, those unions joined the A.F. of L.

=== Conflicts between affiliated unions ===
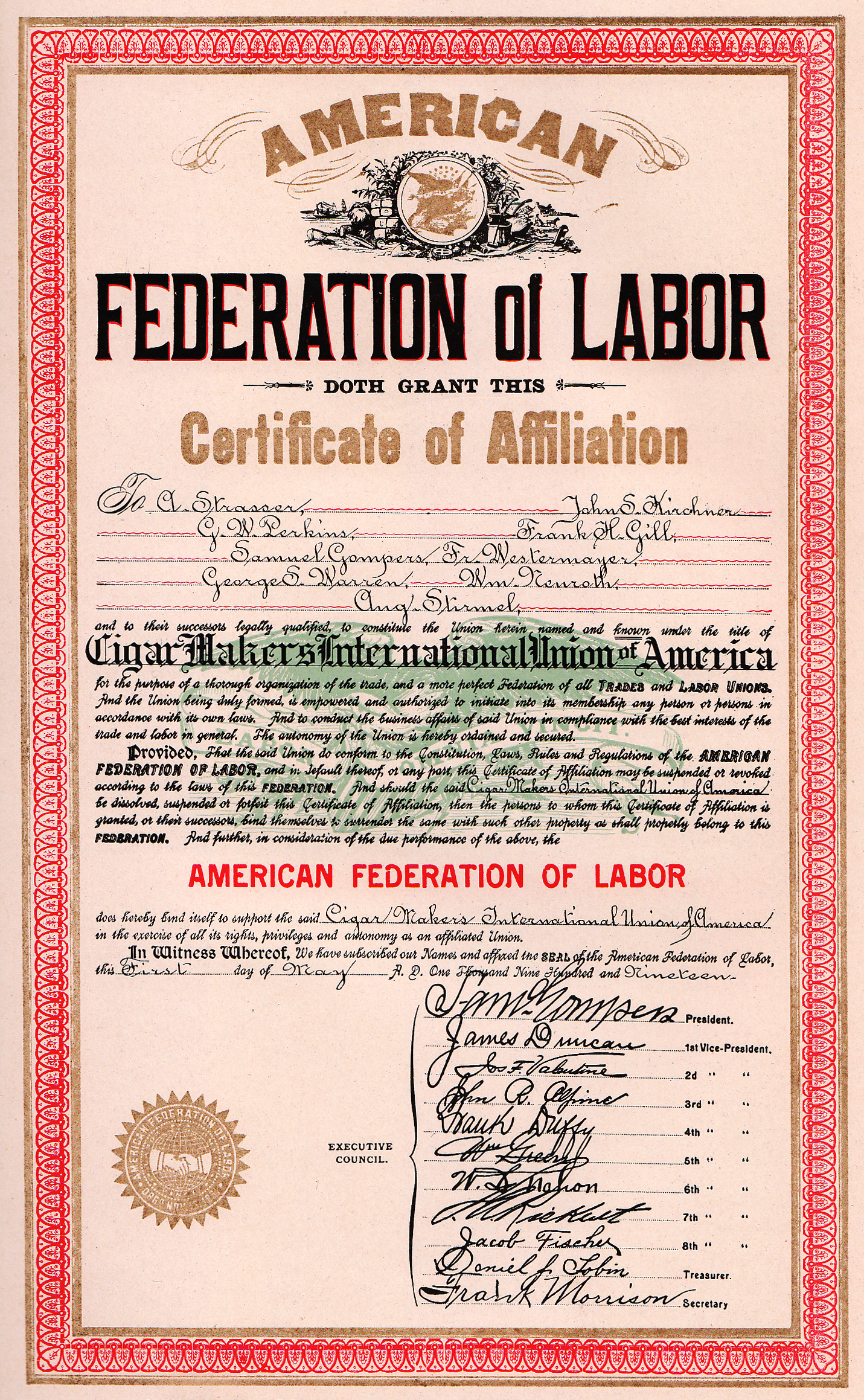
The A.F. of L. arbitrated disputes between member unions and enforced its decisions by rescinding charters, when necessary. (1919 Cigar Makers' Union charter certificate.)

From the beginning, unions affiliated with the A.F. of L. found themselves in conflict when both unions claimed jurisdiction over the same groups of workers: both the Brewers and Teamsters claimed to represent beer truck drivers, both the Machinists and the International Typographical Union claimed to represent certain printroom employees, and the Machinists and a fledgling union known as the "Carriage, Wagon and Automobile Workers Union" sought to organize the same employees even though neither union had made any effort to organize or bargain for those employees. In some cases, the A.F. of L. mediated the dispute, usually by favoring the larger or more influential union. The A.F. of L. often reversed its jurisdictional rulings over time, as the continuing jurisdictional battles between the Brewers and the Teamsters showed.

Affiliates within the AFL formed "departments" to help resolve these jurisdictional conflicts and to provide a more effective voice for member unions in given industries. The Metal Trades Department engaged in some organizing of its own, primarily in shipbuilding, where unions such as the Pipefitters, Machinists and Iron Workers joined through local metal workers' councils to represent a diverse group of workers. The Railway Employes' Department dealt with both jurisdictional disputes between affiliates and pursued a common legislative agenda for all of them.

== Historical achievements ==
=== Organizing and coordination ===
The A.F. of L. made efforts in its early years to assist its affiliates in organizing: it advanced funds or provided organizers or, in some cases, such as the International Brotherhood of Electrical Workers, the Teamsters and the American Federation of Musicians, helped form the union. The A.F. of L. also used its influence, including refusal of charters or expulsion, to heal splits within affiliated unions, to force separate unions seeking to represent the same or closely related jurisdictions to merge, or to mediate disputes between rival factions where both sides claimed to represent the leadership of an affiliated union. The A.F. of L. also chartered "federal unions", local unions not affiliated with any international union, in those fields in which no affiliate claimed jurisdiction.

The A.F. of L. also encouraged the formation of local labor bodies, known as central labor councils, in major metropolitan areas in which all of the affiliates could participate. Those local labor councils acquired a great deal of influence in some cases. For example, the Chicago Federation of Labor spearheaded efforts to organize packinghouse and steel workers during and immediately after World War I. Local building trades councils also became powerful in some areas. In San Francisco, the local Building Trades Council, led by Carpenters official P. H. McCarthy, not only dominated the local labor council but helped elect McCarthy mayor of San Francisco in 1909. In a very few cases early in the A.F. of L.'s history, state and local bodies defied A.F. of L. policy or chose to disaffiliate over policy disputes.

=== Political action ===
Though Gompers had contact with socialists and such as A.F. of L. co-founder Peter J. McGuire, the A.F. of L. adopted a philosophy of "business unionism" that emphasized unions' contribution to businesses' profits and national economic growth. The business unionist approach also focused on skilled workers' immediate job-related interests, while refusing to "rush to the support of any one of the numerous society-saving or society destroying schemes" involved in larger political issues. This approach was set by Gompers, who was influenced by a fellow cigar maker (and former socialist) Ferdinand Laurrel. Despite his socialist contacts, Gompers himself was not a socialist.

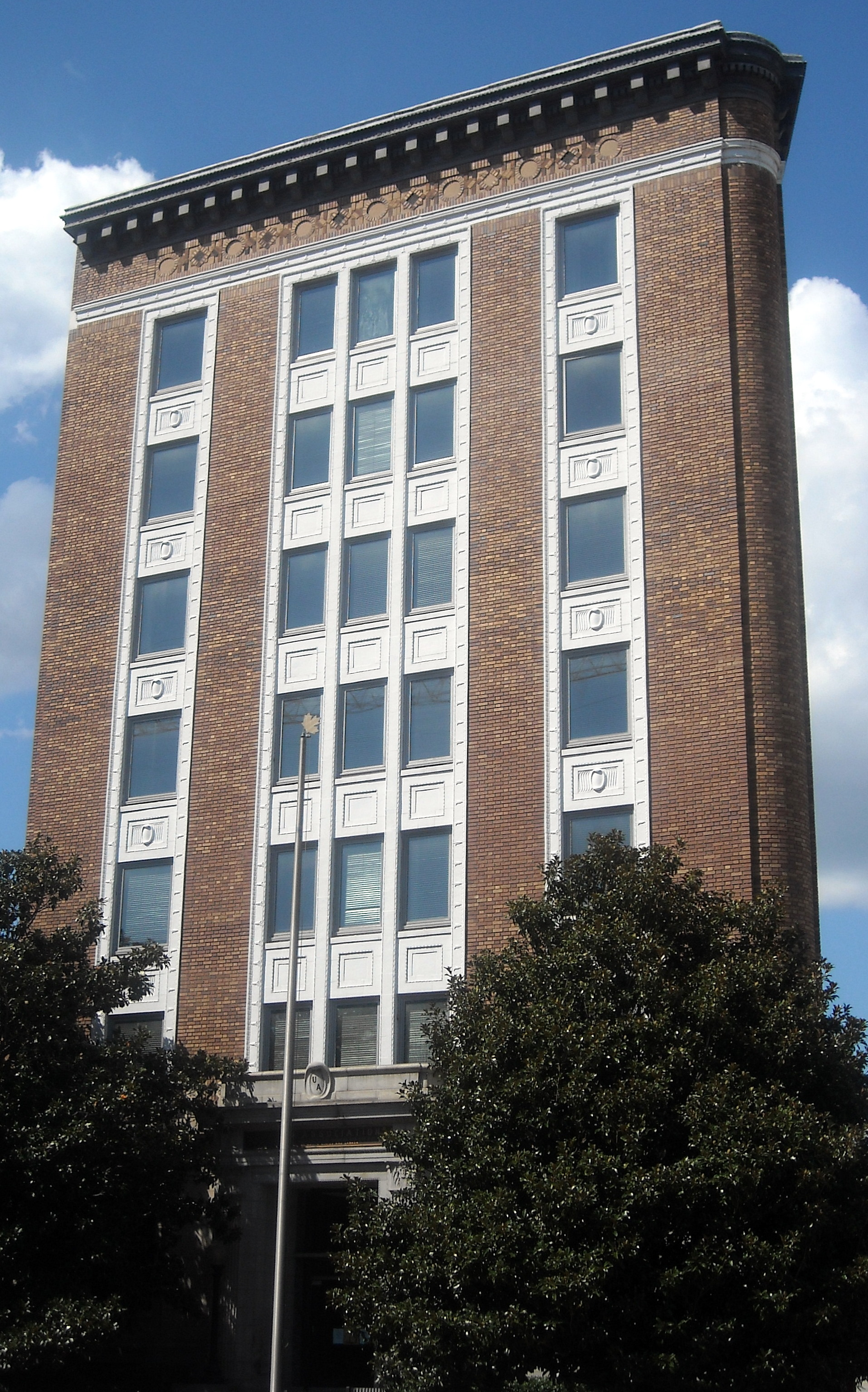
The American Federation of Labor Building, a National Historic Landmark, in Washington, D.C.

Employers discovered the efficacy of labor injunctions, first used with great effect by the Cleveland administration during the Pullman Strike in 1894. While the A.F. of L. sought to outlaw "yellow dog contracts", to limit the courts' power to impose "government by injunction" and to obtain exemption from the antitrust laws that were being used to criminalize labor organizing, the courts reversed what few legislative successes the labor movement won.

The A.F. of L. concentrated its political efforts during the last decades of the Gompers administration on securing freedom from state control of unions—in particular an end to the court's use of labor injunctions to block the right to organize or strike and the application of the anti-trust laws to criminalize labor's use of pickets, boycotts and strikes. The A.F. of L. thought that it had achieved the latter with the passage of the Clayton Antitrust Act in 1914—which Gompers referred to as "Labor's Magna Carta". But in Duplex Printing Press Co. v. Deering, 254 U.S. 443 (1921), the United States Supreme Court narrowly read the Act and codified the federal courts' existing power to issue injunctions rather than limit it. The court read the phrase "between an employer and employees" (contained in the first paragraph of the Act) to refer only to cases involving an employer and its own employees, leaving the courts free to punish unions for engaging in sympathy strikes or secondary boycotts.

The A.F. of L.'s pessimistic attitude towards politics did not, on the other hand, prevent affiliated unions from pursuing their own agendas. Construction unions supported legislation that governed entry of contractors into the industry and protected workers' rights to pay, rail and mass production industries sought workplace safety legislation, and unions generally agitated for the passage of workers' compensation statutes.

At the same time, the A.F. of L. took efforts on behalf of women in supporting protective legislation. It advocated fewer hours for women workers, and based its arguments on assumptions of female weakness. Like efforts to unionize, most support for protective legislation for women came out of a desire to protect men's jobs. If women's hours could be limited, reasoned A.F. of L. officials, they would infringe less on male employment and earning potential. But the A.F. of L. also took more selfless efforts. Even from the 1890s, the A.F. of L. declared itself vigorously in favor of women's suffrage. It often printed pro-suffrage articles in its periodical, and in 1918, it supported the National Union of Women's Suffrage.

The A.F. of L. relaxed its rigid stand against legislation after the death of Gompers. Even so, it remained cautious. Its proposals for unemployment benefits (made in the late 1920s) were too modest to have practical value, as the Great Depression soon showed. The impetus for the major federal labor laws of the 1930s came from the New Deal. The enormous growth in union membership came after Congress passed the National Industrial Recovery Act in 1933 and National Labor Relations Act in 1935. The A.F. of L. refused to sanction or participate in the mass strikes led by John L. Lewis of the United Mine Workers and other left unions such as the Amalgamated Clothing Workers of America. After the A.F. of L. expelled the CIO in 1936, the CIO undertook a major organizing effort. In 1947, when the Taft-Hartley Act was passed, political activities were stirred. In resistance to the new law, the CIO joined the A.F. of L., and political co-operation set the path for union unity. The two groups merged, eight years later, into the AFL–CIO coalition with George Meany as the new president.

== Leadership ==
=== Presidents ===
- Samuel Gompers, 1886–1894
- John McBride, 1894–1895
- Samuel Gompers, 1895–1924
- William Green, 1924–1952
- George Meany, 1952–1955 (afterwards President of the AFL–CIO)

=== Secretaries ===
1886: Peter J. McGuire
1889: Chris Evans
1894: August McCraith
1897: Frank Morrison
1935: Position merged

=== Treasurers ===
1886: Gabriel Edmonston
1890: John Brown Lennon
1917: Daniel J. Tobin
1928: Martin Francis Ryan
1935: Position merged

=== Secretary-Treasureres ===
1936: Frank Morrison
1939: George Meany
1952: William F. Schnitzler

== Affiliated unions and brotherhoods ==
Sources: American Labor Year Book, 1926, pp. 85–87, 103–172. American Labor Press Directory, pp. 1–11.

Union	Organized	Affiliated	Left	Reason left	1900 members	1925 members	1953 members
Actors and Artistes of America, Associated	1919	1919	1955	Transferred to AFL–CIO	N/A	10,100	36,200
Agricultural Workers' Union, National	1934	1946	1955	Transferred to AFL–CIO	N/A	N/A	12,700
Air Line Dispatchers' Association			1955	Transferred to AFL–CIO	N/A	N/A	524
Air Line Pilots' Association, International	1931		1955	Transferred to AFL–CIO	N/A	N/A	6,500
Aluminum Workers' International Union	1953	1953	1955	Transferred to AFL–CIO	N/A	N/A	N/A
Asbestos Workers, International Union of Heat and Frost Insulators and	1887	1887	1955	Transferred to AFL–CIO		2,400	6,000
Automobile Workers of America, International Union of United	1935	1939	1955	Transferred to AFL–CIO	N/A	N/A	100,000
Auto Workers, United	1935	1935	1936	Transferred to CIO	N/A	N/A	N/A
Bakery and Confectionery Workers of America, International Union of	1886	1887	1955	Transferred to AFL–CIO	4,500	21,800	172,000
Barbers' International Union of America, Journeymen	1887	1888	1955	Transferred to AFL–CIO	6,900	48,000	65,000
Bill Posters and Billers of America, International Alliance of	1902	1903	1955	Transferred to AFL–CIO	N/A	1,600	1,000
Blacksmiths, Drop Forgers and Helpers, International Brotherhood of	1890	1890	1951	Merged into Boilermakers	1,500	5,000	N/A
Boilermakers and Iron Shipbuilders, International Brotherhood of	1880	1882	1955	Transferred to AFL–CIO	4,800	17,100	150,000
Bookbinders, International Brotherhood of	1892	1892	1955	Transferred to AFL–CIO	3,600	13,600	49,000
Boot and Shoe Workers' Union	1895	1895	1955	Transferred to AFL–CIO	4,700	36,200	50,000
Brassworkers, International Brotherhood of						N/A	N/A
Brewery, Flour, Cereal and Soft Drink Workers of America	1884	1887	1941	Suspended	18,300	16,000	N/A
Brick and Clay Workers of America, United	1894	1896	1955	Transferred to AFL–CIO	1,400	5,000	23,000
Bricklayers', Masons and Plasterers' International Union of America	1865	1916	1955	Transferred to AFL–CIO	33,400	70,000	100,000
Bridge, Structural and Ornamental Iron Workers, International Association of	1896	1903	1955	Transferred to AFL–CIO	6,000	16,300	125,000
Broom and Whisk Makers' Union, International	1893	1893	1955	Transferred to AFL–CIO	400	700	380
Building Laborers' International Protective Union of North America		1898	1901	Suspended		N/A	N/A
Building Service Employees International Union	1921	1921	1955	Transferred to AFL–CIO	N/A	6,200	185,000
Carpenters and Joiners, Amalgamated Association of	1867	1890	1912	Expelled	2,000	N/A	N/A
Carpenters and Joiners of America, United Brotherhood of	1867	1886	1955	Transferred to AFL–CIO	68,400	317,000	750,000
Carriage and Wagonmakers' International Union						N/A	N/A
Cement, Lime and Gypsum Workers' International Union, United	1939	1939	1955	Transferred to AFL–CIO	N/A	N/A	35,157
Chemical Workers' Union, International	1944	1944	1955	Transferred to AFL–CIO	N/A	N/A	69,500
Cigarmakers' International Union	1864	1887	1955	Transferred to AFL–CIO	37,100	23,500	11,000
Cleaning and Dye House Workers, International Association of	1937	1937	1955	Transferred to AFL–CIO	N/A	N/A	20,000
Cloth Hat, Cap and Millinery Workers' International Union	1901	1902	1934	Merged into Hatters	N/A	7,800	N/A
Conductors, Order of Sleeping Car	1918	1919	1955	Transferred to AFL–CIO	N/A	2,300	16,819
Coopers' International Union of North America	1890	1891	1955	Transferred to AFL–CIO	4,500	1,300	5,000
Cutting Die and Cutter Makers of America, International Union of		1904	1923	Suspended	N/A	N/A	N/A
Diamond Workers' Protective Union of America	1910	1912	1954	Merged into Jewelry Workers	N/A	400	500
Distillery, Rectifying and Wine Workers' International Union of America	1940	1940	1955	Transferred to AFL–CIO	N/A	N/A	25,000
Elastic Goring Weavers, Amalgamated Association of	1894	1894	1927	Dissolved	300	100	N/A
Electrical Workers, International Brotherhood of	1891	1891	1955	Transferred to AFL–CIO	4,800	142,000	500,000
Elevator Constructors, International Union of	1901	1903	1955	Transferred to AFL–CIO	N/A	8,100	10,000
Federal Employees, National Federation of	1917	1917	1931	Disaffiliated	N/A	20,200	N/A
Fire Fighters, International Association of	1918	1918	1955	Transferred to AFL–CIO	N/A	16,000	76,000
Flat Glass Workers of America, Federation of	1934	1934	1936	Transferred to CIO	N/A	N/A	N/A
Flight Engineers' International Association	1948	1948	1955	Transferred to AFL–CIO	N/A	N/A	720
Foundry Employees, International Brotherhood of	1904	1904	1939	Expelled	N/A	3,500	N/A
Furriers' Union of the United States of America and Canada		1892	1896	Resigned		N/A	N/A
Fur Workers' Union of the United States and Canada, International	1913	1913	1937	Transferred to CIO	N/A	11,400	N/A
Furniture Workers of America, International Union of		1887	1896	Merged into Wood Workers		N/A	N/A
Garment Workers of America, United	1891	1891	1955	Transferred to AFL–CIO	7,400	47,500	50,000
Glass Bottle Blowers' Association	1847	1899	1955	Transferred to AFL–CIO	4,200	6,000	41,000
Glass Cutters' League of America, Window	1917	1928	1955	Transferred to AFL–CIO	N/A	N/A	1,600
Glass Employees' Association of America		1890	1896	Suspended		N/A	N/A
Glass Workers' Union, American Flint	1878	1912	1955	Transferred to AFL–CIO	8,000	5,300	30,028
Glass Workers, National Window	1872	1918	1928	Dissolved		2,000	N/A
Glove Workers' Union of America, International	1902	1902	1955	Transferred to AFL–CIO	N/A	300	3,000
Government Employees, American Federation of	1932	1932	1955	Transferred to AFL–CIO	N/A	N/A	48,000
Grain Millers, American Federation of	1948	1948	1955	Transferred to AFL–CIO	N/A	N/A	35,000
Granite Cutters' International Association	1877	1886	1955	Transferred to AFL–CIO	5,900	8,500	4,000
Handbag, Luggage, Belt, and Novelty Workers' Union, International	1937	1937	1955	Transferred to AFL–CIO	N/A	N/A	25,000
Hatfinishers' International Union of North America			1896	Merged into Hatters	N/A	N/A	N/A
Hatmakers' International Union of North America			1896	Merged into Hatters	N/A	N/A	N/A
Hatters of North America, United	1896	1896	1955	Transferred to AFL–CIO	7,600	11,500	32,000
Hod Carriers, Building and Common Laborers' Union, International	1903	1903	1955	Transferred to AFL–CIO	N/A	61,500	386,000
Horseshoers of United States and Canada, International Union of Journeymen	1874	1893	1955	Transferred to AFL–CIO	2,100	2,000	243
Horse Collar Makers' National Union		1888	1893	Suspended		N/A	N/A
Hosiery Workers, American Federation of	1915	1923	1955	Transferred to AFL–CIO	N/A		30,000
Hotel and Restaurant Employees' International Alliance and Bartenders' League of America	1890	1890	1955	Transferred to AFL–CIO	4,800	38,500	402,000
Insurance Agents' International Union	1951	1951	1955	Transferred to AFL–CIO	N/A	N/A	2,000
Iron, Steel and Tin Workers, Amalgamated Association of	1876	1887	1935	Transferred to CIO	14,000	11,400	N/A
Jewelry Workers' Union, International	1916	1916	1955	Transferred to AFL–CIO	N/A	800	16,000
Lace Operatives of America, The Chartered Association of	1892	1894	1919	Expelled	400	N/A	N/A
Ladies' Garment Workers Union, International	1900	1900	1955	Transferred to AFL–CIO	2,000	90,000	390,000
Lasters' Protective Union		1887	1895	Merged into Boot and Shoe		N/A	N/A
Lathers, International Union of Wood, Wire and Metal	1899	1900	1955	Transferred to AFL–CIO	600	8,900	15,000
Laundry Workers' International Union	1900	1900	1955	Transferred to AFL–CIO	2,100	5,500	100,000
Leather Workers' International Union, United	1917	1917	1951	Merged into Meat Cutters	N/A	2,000	N/A
Letter Carriers, National Association of	1889	1917	1955	Transferred to AFL–CIO	13,800	32,500	95,000
Letter Carriers, National Federation of Rural	1920	1920	1946	Merged into Letter Carriers	N/A	300	N/A
Lithographers of America, Amalgamated	1882	1906	1946	Transferred to CIO	1,800	5,300	N/A
Locomotive Engineers, Brotherhood of	1883					N/A	N/A
Locomotive Firemen, Brotherhood of	1873					N/A	N/A
Longshoremen, International Brotherhood of	1953	1953	1955	Transferred to AFL–CIO	N/A	N/A	N/A
Longshoremen's Association, International	1892	1896	1953	Expelled	20,000	31,800	75,000
Machinists, International Association of	1888	1895	1955	Transferred to AFL–CIO	23,500	71,400	699,298
Machinists' International Union		1891	1896	Suspended		N/A	N/A
Maintenance of Way Employes, United Brotherhood of	1886	1900	1955	Transferred to AFL–CIO	3,000	37,400	182,831
Marble, Slate and Stone Polishers, Rubbers and Sawyers, Tile and Marble Setters' Helpers, International Association of	1916	1916	1955	Transferred to AFL–CIO	N/A	3,200	5,500
Marine Engineers' Beneficial Association, National	1875		1923	Disaffiliated	6,000	N/A	N/A
Masters, Mates and Pilots of America	1897	1914	1955	Transferred to AFL–CIO		3,900	9,000
Meat Cutters and Butcher Workmen, Amalgamated	1897	1897	1955	Transferred to AFL–CIO	3,200	12,200	195,000
Mechanics and Foremen of Naval Shore Establishments, National Association of Master		1933	1955	Transferred to AFL–CIO	N/A	N/A	500
Messengers, National Association of Special Delivery	1932	1937	1955	Transferred to AFL–CIO	N/A	N/A	2,000
Metal Engravers' International Union	1920	1921	1955	Transferred to AFL–CIO	N/A	100	500
Metal Polishers Union of North America, International	1892	1896	1955	Transferred to AFL–CIO	5,000	6,000	20,000
Mine, Mill and Smelter Workers, International Union of	1893	1896	1935	Transferred to CIO		8,500	N/A
Mine Workers of America, United	1890	1890	1955	Transferred to AFL–CIO	115,500	400,000	600,000
Molders' Union of America, International	1859	1886	1955	Transferred to AFL–CIO	18,000	27,500	65,000
Mosaic and Encaustic Tilelayers' International Union		1890	1918	Suspended		N/A	N/A
Musicians, American Federation of	1896	1896	1955	Transferred to AFL–CIO	6,200	80,000	242,167
Musicians' Mutual League						N/A	N/A
Office Employees International Union	1942	1945	1955	Transferred to AFL–CIO	N/A	N/A	28,900
Oil Field, Gas Well and Refinery Workers of America, International Association of	1919	1919	1935	Transferred to CIO	N/A	1,200	N/A
Painters, Decorators and Paperhangers of America, Brotherhood of	1887	1887	1955	Transferred to AFL–CIO	28,000	107,600	208,189
Papermakers, International Brotherhood of	1892	1897	1955	Transferred to AFL–CIO	400	5,000	208,189
Pattern Makers' League of North America	1887	1894	1955	Transferred to AFL–CIO	2,200	7,000	12,000
Pavers, Rammermen, Flag Layers, Bridge and Stone Curb Setters and Sheet Asphalt Pavers, International Union of	1905	1905	1937	Merged into Hod Carriers	N/A	2,000	N/A
Paving Cutters' Union of the United States	1901	1904		Disaffiliated	N/A	2,400	N/A
Pen and Pocket Knife Grinders' and Polishers' National Union						N/A	N/A
Photo-Engravers' Union of North America, International	1900	1904	1955	Transferred to AFL–CIO	400	7,200	14,222
Piano, Organ and Musical Instrument Workers' Union of America, International	1898	1902		Merged into Carpenters	6,100	600	N/A
Plasterers and Cement Finishers' International Association of the United States and Canada, Operative	1862	1908	1955	Transferred to AFL–CIO	6,500	30,000	37,300
Plate Printers' and Die Stampers' Union of North America, International	1891	1898	1955	Transferred to AFL–CIO	600	1,200	1,000
Plumbers and Steamfitters of the United States and Canada, United Association of	1889	1897	1955	Transferred to AFL–CIO	4,500	39,200	201,343
Pocketbook Workers of America, International	1923	1925	1951	Merged into Handbag Workers	N/A	N/A	N/A
Post Office and Postal Transportation Service Mail Handlers, Watchmen and Messengers, National Association of			1955	Transferred to AFL–CIO	N/A	N/A	2,000
Postal Supervisors, National Association of	1908	1946	1955	Disaffiliated	N/A	N/A	16,500
Postal Transport Association, National	1898	1917	1955	Transferred to AFL–CIO	N/A	N/A	27,000
Post Office Clerks, National Federation of	1906	1906	1955	Transferred to AFL–CIO	N/A	23,700	95,000
Potters, National Brotherhood of Operative	1899	1899	1955	Transferred to AFL–CIO	2,200	8,100	30,000
Powder and High Explosive Workers, United	1902	1902	1943	Disbanded	N/A	200	N/A
Print Cutters' Association of America, International			1923	Merged with Timber Workers	N/A	N/A	N/A
Printers and Color Mixers of the United States, International Association of Machine			1923	Merged with Timber Workers	N/A	N/A	N/A
Printing Pressmen and Assistants' Union of North America, International	1889	1890	1955	Transferred to AFL–CIO	9,100	40,000	95,000
Pulp, Sulphite and Paper Mill Workers, International Brotherhood of	1906	1909	1955	Transferred to AFL–CIO	N/A	5,000	141,575
Quarrymen's National Union of America						N/A	N/A
Quarry Workers' International Union of North America	1903	1903	1938	Transferred to CIO	N/A	3,000	N/A
Radio and Television Directors' Guild	1946	1946	1955	Transferred to AFL–CIO	N/A	N/A	600
Railroadmen's Union, Steam						N/A	N/A
Railroad Signalmen of America, Brotherhood of	1908	1914	1955	Transferred to AFL–CIO	N/A	8,000	14,394
Railroad Telegraphers, Order of	1886	1899	1955	Transferred to AFL–CIO	8,000	39,200	60,000
Railroad Trainmen, Brotherhood of						N/A	N/A
Railroad Yardmasters of America	1912	1946	1955	Transferred to AFL–CIO	N/A	N/A	3,500
Railway Carmen, Brotherhood of	1888	1900	1955	Transferred to AFL–CIO		125,000	106,700
Railway Clerks, Brotherhood of	1899	1908	1955	Transferred to AFL–CIO	500	91,200	300,000
Railway Conductors, Order of	1868					N/A	N/A
Railway Patrolmen's International Union	1949	1949	1955	Transferred to AFL–CIO	N/A	N/A	2,300
Railway Shopmen, Brotherhood of						N/A	N/A
Retail Clerks' International Protective Association	1890	1891	1955	Transferred to AFL–CIO	20,000	10,000	250,000
Roofers, United Slate, Tile and Composition + Damp and Waterproof Workers' Association	1902	1903	1955	Transferred to AFL–CIO	N/A	3,000	13,000
Rubber Workers of America, United	1935	1935	1936	Transferred to CIO	N/A	N/A	N/A
Saddle and Harnessmakers' National Union		1889	1917	Merged into Leather Workers		N/A	N/A
Sawsmiths' National Union		1902	1924	Dissolved	N/A	N/A	N/A
Seamen's International Union of America	1892	1893	1955	Transferred to AFL–CIO	4,200	16,000	70,000
Sheet Metal Workers' Union, Amalgamated	1888	1890	1955	Transferred to AFL–CIO	2,900	25,000	32,000
Siderographers, International Association of	1899		1955	Transferred to AFL–CIO	N/A	N/A	48
Silk Hatters' Association of North America						N/A	N/A
Silk Workers, National Federation of		1889	1892	Suspended		N/A	N/A
Spinners' Union, International	1858	1881	1925	Disaffiliated	2,400	N/A	N/A
Spring Knife Makers' National Protective Union of America						N/A	N/A
Stage Employees and Moving Picture Machine Operators of the United States and Canada	1893	1894	1955	Transferred to AFL–CIO	3,000	20,000	42,000
State, County and Municipal Employees, American Federation of	1932	1936	1955	Transferred to AFL–CIO	N/A	N/A	85,000
Stationary Engineers, Brotherhood of						N/A	N/A
Stationary Firemen and Oilers, International Brotherhood of	1898	1898	1955	Transferred to AFL–CIO	2,400	10,000	60,000
Steam and Operating Engineers, International Union of	1896	1897	1955	Transferred to AFL–CIO	2,700	25,300	187,180
Steam Shovel and Dredgemen, International Brotherhood of	1896	1915	1919	Suspended		N/A	N/A
Stereotypers' and Electrotypers' Union, International	1902	1902	1955	Transferred to AFL–CIO	N/A	6,800	10,500
Stone Cutters' Association, Journeymen	1853	1907	1955	Transferred to AFL–CIO	7,500	5,100	1,900
Stove Mounters' International Union	1892	1894	1955	Transferred to AFL–CIO	900	1,600	12,200
Street and Electric Railway Employees of America, Amalgamated Association of	1892	1893	1955	Transferred to AFL–CIO	3,500	101,000	200,000
Switchmen's Union of North America	1894	1906	1955	Transferred to AFL–CIO	N/A	8,900	10,100
Table Knife Grinders' National Union		1889	1911	Suspended		N/A	N/A
Tack Makers' Protective Union of the United States and Canada						N/A	N/A
Tailors' Union of America, Journeymen	1883	1887	1935	Merged into Clothing Workers	7,300	9,300	N/A
Tanners and Curriers of America, United Brotherhood of		1891	1895	Suspended		N/A	N/A
Teachers, American Federation of	1916	1916	1955	Transferred to AFL–CIO	N/A	3,500	50,000
Teamsters, Chauffeurs, Stablemen and Helpers, International Brotherhood of	1899	1899	1955	Transferred to AFL–CIO	4,700	78,900	1,000,000
Technical Engineers', Architects' and Draftsmen's Unions, International Federation of	1916	1916	1955	Transferred to AFL–CIO	N/A	600	6,800
Telegraphers' Union of America, Commercial	1902	1902	1955	Transferred to AFL–CIO	N/A	4,100	33,705
Textile Workers of America, United	1901	1901	1955	Transferred to AFL–CIO	N/A	30,000	90,000
Theatrical Press Agents and Managers, Association of	1928	1928	1937	Merged into Stage Employees	N/A	?	N/A
Timber Workers, International Union of		1917	1923	Dissolved	N/A	N/A	N/A
Tobacco Workers International Union	1895	1895	1955	Transferred to AFL–CIO	6,000	1,400	32,000
Toy Workers, International Union of Doll and		1952	1955	Transferred to AFL–CIO	N/A	N/A	
Tunnel and Subway Constructors' International Union	1910	1910	1929	Merged into Hod Carriers	N/A	3,000	N/A
Typographia, German-American	1869	1881	1893	Merged into Typographical	N/A	N/A	N/A
Typographical Union, International	1852	1881	1955	Transferred to AFL–CIO	71,000	94,000	
Upholsterers International Union of North America	1882	1892	1955	Transferred to AFL–CIO	59,100	7,600	54,000
Varnishers' International Union of America, Hardwood Furniture and Piano		1893	1894	Suspended		N/A	N/A
Wall Paper Crafts of North America, United	1923	1923	1955	Transferred to AFL–CIO	N/A	600	2,300
Wire Weavers' Protective Association, America	1876	1895	1955	Transferred to AFL–CIO	200	400	400
Wood Carvers' Association of North America, International	1883	1896		Disaffiliated	1,800	1,000	N/A
Wood Workers' International Union of America, Machine		1890	1912	Merged into Carpenters		N/A	N/A
Wool Hatters' Association						N/A	N/A

== State federations ==
- Pennsylvania Federation of Labor
- Texas State Federation of Labor

== See also ==
- AFL–CIO
- Labor history of the United States
- Federation of Organized Trades and Labor Unions
- Industrial Workers of the World
- Knights of Labor
- Labor federation competition in the United States
- Labor unions in the United States
- Western Federation of Miners

== Bibliography ==
=== Primary sources ===
- American Federation of Labor. Some Reasons for Chinese Exclusion. Meat vs. Rice. American Manhood against Asiatic Coolieism. Which Shall Survive? Washington, D.C.: American Federation of Labor, 1901.
- Gompers, Samuel. American Labor and the War. New York: George H. Doran Co., n.d. [1918].
- Gompers, Samuel. Labor and the Employer. New York: E.P. Dutton & Co., 1920.
- Gompers, Samuel. Seventy Years of Life and Labor: An Autobiography. In two volumes. New York: E.P. Dutton & Co., 1925.
- The Samuel Gompers Papers. Currently published in 11 volumes, coverage to 1921. Urbana: University of Illinois Press, 1991–2009.

=== Scholarly secondary sources ===
- Arnesen, Eric, ed. Encyclopedia of U.S. Labor and Working-Class History (2006), 2064pp; 650 articles by experts excerpt and text search
- Baker, Jay N. "The American Federation of Labor" (1912)
- Beik, Millie, ed. Labor Relations: Major Issues in American History (2005) over 100 annotated primary documents excerpt and text search
- Boris, Eileen, Nelson Lichtenstein, and Thomas Paterson. Major Problems In The History Of American Workers: Documents and Essays (2002)
- Brody, David. In Labor's Cause: Main Themes on the History of the American Worker (1993) excerpt and text search
- Brooks, George W.; Derber, Milton; McCabe, David A.; and Taft, Philip (eds.), Interpreting the Labor Movement. Madison: Industrial Relations Research Association, 1952.
- Browne, Waldo Ralph. What's what in the Labor Movement: A Dictionary of Labor Affairs and Labor (1921) 577pp; encyclopedia of labor terms, organizations and history. complete text online
- Commons, John R, et al. History of Labour in the United States. esp. Vol. 2: 1860–1896 (1918); Vol. 4: Labor Movements, 1896–1932 (1935).
- Currarino, Rosanne. "The Politics of 'More': The Labor Question and the Idea of Economic Liberty in Industrial America." Journal of American History. vol. 93, no. 1 (June 2006).
- Dubofsky, Melvyn, and Joseph McCartin. Labor in America: A History (9th ed. 2017), textbook; originally written by Foster Dulles
- Dubofsky, Melvyn, and Warren Van Tine, eds. Labor Leaders in America (1987) biographies of key leaders, written by scholars excerpt and text search
- Foner, Philip S. History of the Labor Movement in the United States. In 10 volumes. New York: International Publishers, 1947–1994; Vol. 2: From the Founding of the American Federation of Labor to the Emergence of American Imperialism (1955); Vol. 3: The Policies and Practices of the American Federation of Labor, 1900–1909 (1964); Vol. 5: The AFL in the Progressive Era, 1910–1915 (1980); Vol. 6: On the Eve of America's Entrance into World War I, 1915–1916 (1982); Vol. 7: Labor and World War I, 1914–1918 (1987); Vol. 8: Post-war Struggles, 1918–1920 (1988). a view from the Left that is hostile to Gompers
- Galenson, Walter. The CIO Challenge to the AFL: A History of the American Labor Movement, 1935–1941 (1960)
- Greene, Julie. Pure and Simple Politics: The American Federation of Labor and Political Activism, 1881–1917 (1998)
  - Greene, Julia Marie. "The strike at the ballot box: Politics and partisanship in the American Federation of Labor, 1881-1916" (PhD dissertation, Yale University; ProQuest Dissertations & Theses, 1990. 9121103).
- Karson, Marc. American Labor Unions and Politics, 1900–1918. (Southern Illinois University Press, 1958).
- Kersten, Andrew E. Labor's home front: the American Federation of Labor during World War II (NYU Press, 2006). online
- Lichtenstein, Nelson. State of the Union: A Century of American Labor (2003) excerpt and text search
- Livesay, Harold C. Samuel Gompers and Organized Labor in America (1993), short biography online
- McCartin, Joseph A. Labor's Great War: The Struggle for Industrial Democracy and the Origins of Modern American Labor Relations, 1912–21. Chapel Hill: The University of North Carolina Press, 1997.
- Mandel, Bernard. Samuel Gompers: A Biography (1963), highly detailed negative biography
- Mink, Gwendolyn. Old Labor and New Immigrants in American Political Development: Union, Party, and State, 1875–1920 (1986)
- Orth, Samuel Peter (1919). The Armies of Labor: A Chronicle of the Organized Wage-Earners. Yale University Press.
- Roberts, William C. (ed.), American Federation of Labor: History, Encyclopedia, Reference Book. Washington, DC: American Federation of Labor, 1919.
- Taft, Philip. The A.F. of L. in the Time of Gompers. (Harper, 1957). online
  - Taft, Philip. The A.F. of L. from the Death of Gompers to the Merger. (Harper, 1959) online vol 2 Major scholarly studies
- Walker, Roger W. "The AFL and child-labor legislation: An exercise in frustration." Labor History 11.3 (1970): 323–340.

=== Collections ===
- Washington State Federation of Labor Records. 1881–1967. 45.44 cubic feet (including 2 microfilm reels, 1 package, and 1 vertical file). At the Labor Archives of Washington, University of Washington Libraries Special Collections.
- Harry E. B. Ault Papers, 1899–1965. 5.46 cubic feet. At the Labor Archives of Washington, University of Washington Libraries Special Collections.
- Leo F. Flynn Papers, 1890–1970. 1.09 cubic feet (2 boxes). At the Labor Archives of Washington, University of Washington Libraries Special Collections.
- George E. Rennar Papers, 1933–1972. approximately 34.73 cubic feet. At the Labor Archives of Washington, University of Washington Libraries Special Collections.
- American Federation of Labor Records, 1883-1925. 90.3 linear feet (354 letterpress books and 341 microfilm reels). At the Manuscript Division, Library of Congress, Washington, D.C.
