= Railway Employes' Department =

Department of the AFL-CIO

The Railway Employes' Department (RED) was a semi-autonomous labour union department of the American Federation of Labor and Congress of Industrial Organizations (AFL–CIO).

== History ==
The department was founded in 1908, as the Railroad Employes' Department, and was chartered by the American Federation of Labor in February 1909. In 1915, it became the "Railway Employes' Department", and it continued to use the old spelling of employees throughout its existence. By 1925, the department had nine affiliates:

- Brotherhood of Maintenance of Way Employees
- Brotherhood of Railway Carmen
- International Association of Machinists
- International Brotherhood of Blacksmiths, Drop Forgers, and Helpers
- International Brotherhood of Boilermakers, Iron Shipbuilders, and Helpers
- International Brotherhood of Electrical Workers
- International Brotherhood of Stationery Firemen and Oilers
- Sheet Metal Workers' International Association
- Switchmen's Union of North America

In 1926, the Railway Labor Executives' Association was founded, a broader organization within which the president of the RED had a single vote.

In 1955, the department became part of the new AFL-CIO. It was dissolved in 1980. In 1990, a new Transportation Trades Department was founded.

== Presidents ==
1908: Henry B. Perham
1912: Arthur O. Wharton
1922: Bert M. Jewell
1946: Fred N. Aten
1961: Michael Fox
1969: James E. Yost
