= Transportation Trades Department, AFL–CIO =

Department of AFL-CIO

TTD
- Transportation Trades Department, AFL-CIO
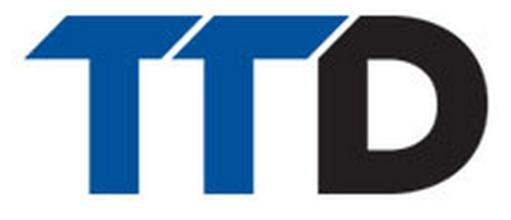
- Founded: February 1990
- Headquarters: Washington, D.C.
- Location: United States
- President: Greg Regan
- Key people: Shari Semelsberger, Secretary-Treasurer
- Parent organization: AFL–CIO
- Website: www.ttd.org

The Transportation Trades Department, AFL–CIO (TTD) is a constitutionally mandated department of the AFL–CIO. It was founded in February 1990 to provide AFL–CIO-affiliated unions whose members work in the transportation industry or who build transportation infrastructure a unified policy-making voice on transportation issues. TTD has 37 member unions as of October 2022.

== Formation ==
Efforts to create a department within the AFL–CIO which united all transportation unions began in the 1960s. The effort received a boost two decades later when Richard I. Kilroy, President of the Brotherhood of Railway and Airline Clerks, and James Kennedy, President of the Transportation Communication Union, began advocating for a new, unified transportation trades department after the abolition of the Railway Employees Department in 1980. The idea was not well-received until after 1987, when the Teamsters (a major transportation union) reaffiliated with the AFL–CIO.

At its founding, TTD represented 1.4 million (10 percent) of the AFL–CIO's 14 million members. Richard I. Kilroy was named the first president of the new department. Walter Shea (director of the Eastern Conference of Teamsters in Washington, D.C.) was elected Secretary-Treasurer. James Kennedy, who was also the executive director of the Railway Labor Executives' Association, was named TTD's first (and, at the time, only) full-time professional staff person.

The United Transportation Union did not join TTD at its formation.

The TTD's inaugural convention was held in early October 1990 in Washington, D.C., with representatives from its 24 member unions (who represented more than 1 million members). The largest delegations came from the Teamsters, the International Association of Machinists, and the Association of Flight Attendants. Other unions well represented at the convention included the Brotherhood of Locomotive Engineers, Communications Workers of America, International Longshoremen's and Warehousemen's Union, Marine Engineers Beneficial Association, Transport Workers Union, Transportation Communication Union, United Auto Workers, and the United Steelworkers of America. Richard Kilroy was elected to a five-year term as TTD President.

== Presidents and Executive Directors ==
In July 1991, Kilroy was defeated for re-election as president of his home union by Robert A. Scardelletti. James Kennedy resigned from TTD in the wake of Kilroy's defeat, and Edward Wytkind, assistant executive director of the department, became executive director. Although Kilroy stepped down (as expected) as TTD president at the department's October executive board meeting, TTD did not immediately name either an interim or permanent successor. Instead, the TTD said Secretary-Treasurer Walter Shea would "assume the duties of the presidency" until February 1992. The TTD executive board subsequently elected Shea president and V.M. Speakman (president of the Brotherhood of Railroad Signalmen) Secretary-Treasurer.

Shea's term of office ended in 1995, and Ron Carey, President of the Teamsters, was elected to take his place. But Carey was expelled from the Teamsters in July 1998 by federal government monitors after allegedly accepting illegal donations for his Teamsters re-election campaign, and Sonny Hall, President of the Transport Workers Union of America (TWU), was elected TTD president.

Hall retired at the end of his five-year term in 2003, and Edward Wytkind was elected president of the Transportation Trades Department.

Wytkind served as president for several successful terms and stepped down in July 2017. He was succeeded by Larry I. Willis, who had previously served as Secretary Treasurer of TTD under Wytkind.

Following Larry Willis' death in November 2021, serving Secretary Treasurer Greg Regan was unanimously elected president of the Transportation Trades Department.

== Issues ==
Two of the main purposes of the Transportation Trades Department are to influence national transportation policy and to speak as a unified voice for the concerns of organized labor on transportation issues. Included among the more notable issues in which the TTD has played a major role are:

- The 1991 national railroad strike.
- Safety issues (including drug and alcohol testing) in rail, truck, and air transportation.
- Trucking deregulation and the North American Free Trade Agreement.
- Railroad mergers, such as the Burlington Northern with the Atchison, Topeka and Santa Fe and the Union Pacific with the Southern Pacific, and the breakup of Conrail.
- Shipping deregulation.
- Amtrak reform.
- Port, rail, and air transport security issues after the 9/11 attacks, and aid for workers in transportation sectors affected by the events.
