= Railroad brotherhoods =

The railroad brotherhoods are labor unions of railroad workers in the United States. They first appeared in 1863 and they are still active. Until recent years they were largely independent of each other and of the American Federation of Labor.

== 1863–1920 ==
With the rapid growth and consolidation of large railroad systems after 1870, union organizations sprang up, covering the entire nation. By 1901, 17 major railway brotherhood were in operation; they generally worked amicably with management, which recognize their usefulness. Key unions included the Brotherhood of Locomotive Engineers (BLE), the Order of Railway Conductors, the Brotherhood of Locomotive Firemen, and the Brotherhood of Railroad Trainmen. Their main goal was building insurance and medical packages for their members, and negotiating bureaucratic work rules that favored their membership, such as seniority and grievance procedures. They were not members of the AFL, and fought off more radical rivals such as the Knights of Labor in the 1880s and the American Railroad Union in the 1890s. They consolidated their power in 1916, after threatening a national strike, by securing the Adamson Act, a federal law that provided 10 hours' pay for an eight-hour day.

== 1920s ==
At the end World War I, the brotherhoods promoted the "Plumb Plan" for the nationalization of the railroads, and conducted a national strike in 1919. Both efforts failed, and the brotherhoods were largely stagnant in the 1920s. They generally were independent politically, but supported the third-party campaign of Robert M. La Follette in 1924.

The Republican Party was dominant in Washington and it was generally hostile to the brotherhoods until it moderated its position around 1926.

The Great Railroad Strike of 1922, a nationwide railroad shop workers' strike, began on July 1. The immediate cause of the strike was the Railroad Labor Board's announcement that hourly wages would be cut by seven cents on July 1, which prompted a shop workers' vote on whether or not to strike. The operators' union did not join in the strike, and the railroads employed strikebreakers to fill three-fourths of the roughly 400,000 vacated positions, increasing hostilities between the railroads and the striking workers. On September 1, a federal judge issued a sweeping injunction against striking, assembling, picketing, colloquially known as the "Daugherty injunction".

Unions bitterly resented the injunction; a few sympathy strikes shut down some railroads completely. The strike eventually died out as many shopmen made deals with the railroads on the local level. The often unpalatable concessions—coupled with memories of the violence and tension during the strike—soured relations between the railroads and the shopmen for years.

In 1926 the Railway Labor Executives' Association was founded as a federation of a number of the brotherhoods with the purpose of acting as a legislative lobbying and policy advisory body.

== 1930s onwards ==
One of the main challenges that railroad brotherhoods faced was growing calls for desegregation. Many railroad brotherhoods had maintained a color bar on membership. The 1944 Tunstall and Steele cases challenged this. A number of black led brotherhoods organised, most prominently the Brotherhood of Sleeping Car Porters organised by the Socialist Party campaigner, A. Philip Randolph, which had ambiguous relationships with the older white brotherhoods, on the one hand fighting craft rules that were seen as discriminatory while on the other modelling themselves on the brotherhood's craft unionism, for instance by staying in the American Federation of Labor rather than the more socialist oriented Congress of Industrial Organisations.

Many of the Railroad Brotherhoods merged into other larger unions such as the Teamsters, the Transportation Communications International Union and the United Transportation Union.

The Railway Labor Executives' Association disbanded in January 1997, with its functions taken on by the Rail Division of the AFL–CIO Transportation Trades Department.

== Main railroad brotherhoods ==
Union	Date organized	Comments
Brotherhood of Locomotive Engineers	1863	Journal: Locomotive Engineers' Journal
Brotherhood of Locomotive Firemen and Enginemen	1873	Now part of United Transportation Union. Journal: Brotherhood of Locomotive Firemen and Enginemen's Magazine.
Order of Railroad Conductors	1868	Journal: The Railroad Conductor
Brotherhood of Railroad Trainmen	1883	Journal: The Railroad Trainman
Order of Railroad Telegraphers	1886	Journal: The Railroad Telegrapher
Brotherhood of Maintenance of Way Employes	1887	Journal:
American Federation of Railroad Workers		Journal: The Railroad Worker
Railroad Yardmasters of America	1918	
Brotherhood of Railway Employees	1901	Journal: Railway Employees' Journal
Order of Railway Expressmen		Journal: The Railway Expressman
Brotherhood of Sleeping Car Porters	1924	

== See also ==
- Brotherhood of Railway Clerks
- Brotherhood of Railway Carmen
- Labor history of the United States § Railroad brotherhoods
