= Transport Workers Union of America =

United States labor union

- Founded: 1934
- Headquarters: Washington, D.C.
- Location: United States
- Members: 139,686 (2020)
- Key people: John Samuelsen, International President
- Affiliations: AFL–CIO
- Website: twu.org

Transport Workers Union of America (TWU) is a United States labor union that was founded in 1934 by subway workers in New York City, then expanded to represent transit employees in other cities, primarily in the eastern U.S. This article discusses the parent union and its largest local, Local 100, which represents the transport workers of New York City. TWU is a member of the AFL–CIO.

TWU established a reputation for militancy and for left-wing politics and was one of the first unions to join the Congress of Industrial Organizations. Its president, Mike Quill, renounced his former Communist allies in the early days of the Cold War, avoiding expulsion from the CIO.

TWU began representing airline employees in 1945, when it organized ground service employees at Pan American World Airways in Miami; it then expanded to represent flight attendants and airline maintenance employees as well. The American Airlines flight attendants in its membership seceded to form their own union, the Association of Professional Flight Attendants, in the 1970s. TWU represents ground service employees, maintenance workers, flight attendants and other employees at a number of different airlines, including American Airlines, United Airlines, Southwest Airlines, and Alaska Airlines.

It also represents employees of Amtrak, Conrail, and several small short line carriers. TWU began representing railway employees in 1954, when it absorbed the United Railroad Workers Organizing Committee, an organizing committee formed by the CIO in 1943 as a rival to the railway brotherhoods within the American Federation of Labor.

== Origins ==
When the union began organizing subway workers in New York in the early 1930s, two of the three subway systems were privately owned and operated. Earlier efforts to organize unions in the industry, generally along craft lines, had been beaten in 1905, 1910, 1916, 1919 and 1926. Most workers on the Interborough Rapid Transit Company (IRT) and the Brooklyn–Manhattan Transit Corporation (BMT) were represented by company unions, while the Brotherhood of Locomotive Engineers and the Brotherhood of Railway Signalmen represented small pockets of skilled workers employed by the BMT.

When The Great Depression hit, public and private management took advantage of high unemployment rates by offering jobs to and keeping on only those individuals willing to accept excessively low wages, brutal management practices, poor working conditions, and other severe aspects. With the national unemployment rate reaching 25 percent, there were nearly 20,000 applicants for every one job in the transit industry.

Pay cuts of ten percent by both the IRT and the BMT, along with the layoff of thousands of employees and a speed up of work for those who remained, spurred new organizing efforts in 1932. Seven subway workers who belonged to Clan na Gael, a longstanding Irish nationalist organization that had received an influx of veterans of the Irish Republican Army in the 1920s, and who were inspired by the socialism and trade union work of James Connolly, met to discuss formation of a trade union. Used to the secrecy of Clan na Gael, they proceeded cautiously, first seeking help from Irish organizations, such as the Ancient Order of Hibernians and the Friendly Sons of St. Patrick.

When those groups declined to involve themselves in something this controversial, the organizers approached the Communist Party. The Communist Party had, in fact, been making organizing efforts of its own among transit workers, beginning in 1933. John Santo and Austin Hogan, Trade Union Unity League organizers, met with the Clan na Gael's members in a cafeteria at Columbus Circle on April 12, 1934. The name that they chose for the new union was a tribute to the Irish Transport and General Workers Union led by Jim Larkin and James Connolly twenty years earlier.

The new organization, founded during the CPUSA's ultrarevolutionary phase as part of the Third Period, focused both on organizing workers into the union and recruiting members for the Party through mimeographed shop papers with titles such as "Red Shuttle" or "Red Dynamo". The new union appointed Thomas H. O'Shea — who would later become a witness against it before the Dies Committee — as its first president.

The TWU declared its aim to represent all public transit workers in the city, regardless of craft, and campaigned to reverse the ten percent wage cut, increase wages to meet increases in the cost of living, limit the workweek to forty hours and hire more workers to eliminate the speedup and to establish safe and sanitary working conditions. The union proceeded clandestinely, forming small groups of trusted friends in order to keep informers at bay, meeting in isolated locations and in subway tunnels. Even so, the IRT managed to infiltrate spies into the organization, as the union discovered when it obtained some of the company's files from sympathetic sources.

One of the workers who had been in attendance at early meetings, Michael J. Quill, quickly attained leadership in this fledgling organization. One of the few who was willing to accept identification as a union activist, he also spread the word about the new union by handing out flyers and delivering soapbox speeches in front of company facilities. His abilities in public speaking, and 'playing to the media' boosted his effectiveness and the overall draw of the union. Another prominent figure in early union history was Douglas McMahon, who led a group of lieutenants assisting Quill.

After a year of organizing, the union formed a Delegates Council, made up of representatives from sections of the system. The new union nearly foundered, however, when Santo and Hogan, delivering the news of a change in party line as the Third Period gave way to the Popular Front era, directed O'Shea and Quill to abandon efforts to form a new union and to run instead for office in the IRT company union, the Interborough Brotherhood. Quill denounced the plan vociferously, to the point that he was nearly expelled from the union. Quill came around, however, by the next party meeting and began attending Brotherhood meetings — while still recruiting workers there to join the TWU.

TWU members succeeded, in fact, in turning Brotherhood meetings into a platform for the new union. The Brotherhood had agreed to a new pension program to replace the one that the IRT had created during the 1916 strike. The new plan, which went into effect in 1934, shifted most of the cost to workers. TWU activists attacked the plan and the pay cut from two years before at Brotherhood meetings that hundreds of IRT employees attended, taking over the platform at some meetings and holding large rallies outside the meeting hall in other cases.

The first significant strike by the newly formed union was in 1935. Previous strike attempts in 1905, 1910, 1916 and 1919 were crushed by the transit companies' use of hired goons who intimidated and violently attacked any who opposed the transit companies.

On July 9, 1935, however, the Squeegee Strike demonstrated the power of the union. Management at the Jerome Avenue barn in the Bronx attempted to make the cleaning crews work faster by forcing the use of a 14-inch squeegee instead of the customary 10-inch tool. When six Car Cleaners were fired for insubordination, a two-day walkout inspired by the TWU caused the management to acquiesce and reinstate the workers.

A second incident that helped establish the union's reputation among transit workers was initiated the next month by the IRT, when Quill and a number of colleagues were jumped by goons at Grand Central Station. Strangely, this led to Quill and four other union activists, including Herbert C. Holmstrom, Thomas H. O'Shea, Patrick McHugh and Serafino Machado, being arrested for inciting a riot. The charges were later quickly dismissed by a court. Nonetheless, the incident was retold in the media and at various work locations, where it epitomized and typified the cumulative history of abuses suffered by transit workers throughout the city.

Organizing among the more dispersed transit workers outside the powerhouses, machine shops and car barns proved to more challenging. The union relied to some extent on the network of Clan na Gael members scattered throughout the IRT; those workers could appeal, using the prestige of their past association with the Irish Republican Army, to the thousands of Irish workers around them. The clandestine style of the IRA both aided in organizing fearful workers and attracted them by imbuing the organization with the mystique of secrecy and intrigue.

At the same time Santo and Hogan recruited transit workers into the Communist Party, which organized along similar lines. The party began taking a far less visible role, however, as the organizing drive picked up steam and as the party entered the Popular Front era. The Communist Party stopped publishing its shop papers after some workers complained that they were hurting the union's organizing drive. While Communist Party members still provided much of the leadership for the union, they refrained from identifying themselves as such.

Later the party directed the union to seek affiliation within the American Federation of Labor, which it finally did in 1936, after unsuccessful negotiations with the Amalgamated Association of Street Railway Employees, by becoming Lodge 1547 of the International Association of Machinists. The union did so, but did not relinquish any significant amount of its autonomy during what proved to be a short-lived relationship.

== Winning recognition ==
The union continued its patient organizing campaign until January 23, 1937, when the BMT fired two union members at the Kent Avenue powerhouse plant in Brooklyn for union activity. The TWU at the time had no more than thirty-five members out of more than 500 workers there. Two days later, however, at 3:00 p.m., the 498 employees there, all wearing TWU buttons, began a sitdown strike, seizing control of the plant until management reinstated the workers it had fired. Other BMT employees established a picket line outside the plant and defended it from the efforts of the police to retake it, while helping to supply the workers inside with food supplied by the Retail Clerks union.

The union then gave the BMT a deadline: reinstate the three fired engineers by 6:00 a.m. the next day or they would shut off the electricity for the system, affecting 2,400,000 BMT riders. The BMT folded a half-hour before the deadline and agreed to meet to discuss the union's demand for recognition as the exclusive bargaining representative of its employees. While the union did not win that demand, its victory at Kent Avenue established it as the de facto representative of these workers and, in time, all of the BMT's employees. Also, this marked the beginning of the end of the harsh treatment of transit workers in the nation's largest city.

The TWU severed its relations with the Machinists and joined the CIO as a national union on May 10, 1937. Quill had already replaced O'Shea as President of the union, while Santo became its Secretary-Treasurer.

The union won an NLRB-conducted election among the IRT's 13,500 employees by a landslide in May, then grew to 43,000 members by June of that year, as it now had more than half of the employees of all of the three subway lines, several bus and streetcar companies and seven major taxicab companies signed up as members. The union also won recognition for most of the BMT's employees, although they found this more difficult: they were not able to displace either the Brotherhood of Locomotive Engineers or the Brotherhood of Railway Signalmen in the units in which they were the established representative, and took two elections to win among the ticket-sellers. The union had grown from 8,000 to 30,000 members in a year.

== Public ownership ==
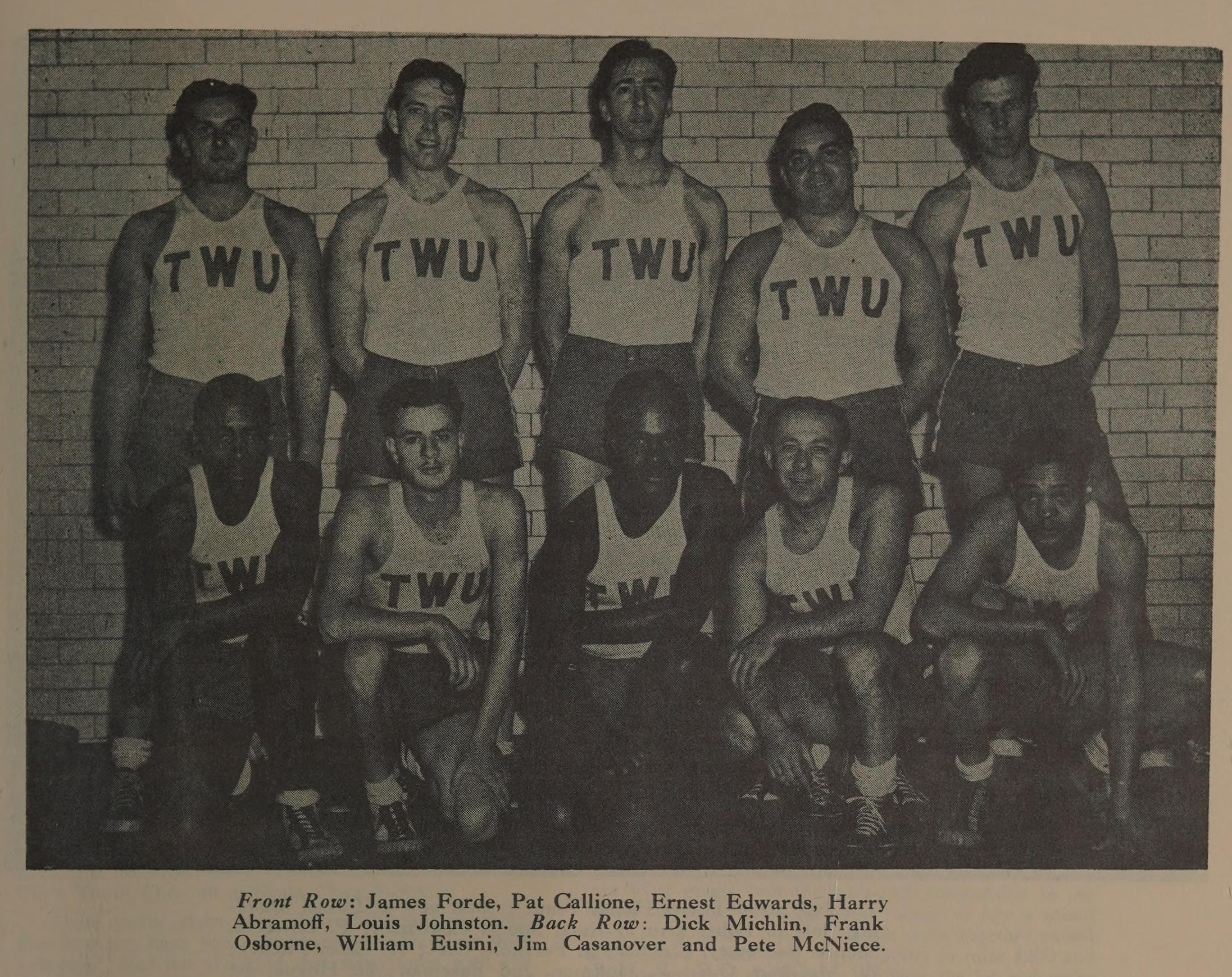
TWU basketball team, 1938

The union soon faced a serious challenge to its newly won status as representative of the employees of the IRT and BMT when the City bought those lines in 1938. The union had already discovered that the City Board of Transportation, which ran the smaller Independent Subway System (IND), was as dismissive of unions as the private lines, even though two of the three members had union backgrounds before they entered politics.

Mayor Fiorello La Guardia, who had represented the Amalgamated Clothing Workers as a lawyer in private practice twenty years earlier, and who had received labor's support in running for Mayor of New York, was likewise hostile to any union of city employees that could not be bent to his will and contemptuous of those that could. Even though the TWU, in coalition with the Amalgamated Association, swept the election to determine which union should represent the IND's employees, the Board refused to bargain with it. La Guardia invited the Brotherhood of Railroad Trainmen to represent the motormen, but had to retreat when Roy Wilkins of the NAACP pointed out that this brotherhood did not allow African-American workers to join, while the TWU did. The union's organizing drive on the IND, however, stalled in the face of official opposition.

The city's plan to buy the IRT and BMT threatened even greater problems, however, since the city, as prospective employer, not only threatened to refuse to recognize the TWU, but argued that collective bargaining was inappropriate for civil service employees. In addition, public ownership would make both the closed shop and the right to strike unlawful.

The union, faced with a challenge to its very existence, threatened to strike if the Mayor went through with this plan. With the support of the national CIO, the union was able to maintain its collective bargaining agreements and the right to represent the IRT and BMT employees after the City took over those systems in 1940. The union soon found itself struggling with the special problems of creating a civil service system for thousands of employees, while providing representation for thousands of workers who faced problems with meeting the city's new naturalization and medical requirements. But the union lost ground among its members, both in terms of actual numbers after it lost the closed shop and in terms of actual support, since many workers who may have remained members saw the union as less important now that they had the seeming job security that civil service status promised and the union had lost the right to strike.

The union did not, however, concede the last point. After winning a contentious strike against the privately owned bus companies in early 1941, during which La Guardia had announced plans to have the police guard strikebreakers in the event that the companies attempted to operate, the union made public preparations for a strike against the City if it challenged the union's right to represent these employees or to roll back their contract rights. La Guardia responded by directing the Police Department to develop plans to run the subways in the event of a strike and supporting legislation that made it a crime for workers to leave transit equipment unattended. La Guardia went further and announced that while workers could choose organizations to represent them, the city had no obligation to recognize those organizations as the exclusive representative of those workers or to engage in collective bargaining with them.

In the end the adversaries resolved their differences, but in a very ambiguous way, through intermediaries, without actually settling the key issues. With the intervention of the Roosevelt administration and the national leadership of the CIO, the City agreed, in a series of telegrams exchanged in June, 1941 between LaGuardia and Philip Murray of the CIO, to maintain the status quo under the collective bargaining agreements with the TWU that the city had assumed, while agreeing to disagree as to whether they would bargain in the future. The parties also differed on practical details: the City took the position that promotions would be made according to Civil Service requirements, the CIO took the position that seniority provisions would still govern. The union not only survived, but regained much of the ground it had lost among transit workers during the next four years.

== Internal and external pressures ==
At the same time that the union was fighting La Guardia, it found itself challenged by dissidents within the union and the Association of Catholic Trade Unionists and rival unions outside it. The CPUSA's dominant position within its officialdom and staff was the galvanizing issue.

Quill and the union leadership gave their opponents all the ammunition they needed by following the changes in the CPUSA's foreign policy, moving to a militant policy after the Molotov–Ribbentrop pact in 1939, then coming out against strikes after the Nazi invasion of the Soviet Union in 1941. The United States' entry into the war, however, largely smoothed over many of these differences, even narrowing the union's differences with the La Guardia administration by restoring the grand Popular Front coalition to some of its former influence.

Quill disposed of his internal critics by bringing union charges against more than a hundred opponents. The union also drove off a somewhat clumsy attempt by District 50 of the United Mine Workers of America, which had organized utility workers and other urban workers far removed from the coalfields, to replace the TWU.

The union also strengthened its relationships with the African-American community. The union, which faced significant resistance within its own predominantly white membership to elimination of employment discrimination against blacks, nonetheless joined with the NAACP, the National Negro Congress and Adam Clayton Powell Jr. in pressuring privately owned bus companies the other transit companies to allow blacks to work in positions other than the porter and heavy maintenance positions to which they had been relegated. The union negotiated strong language in 1941 requiring the companies to set quotas for the hiring of black mechanics and drivers to undo the historic exclusion of blacks from those positions. The union also adopted a strong civil rights platform, calling for national legislation and combating racism in its own ranks.

== Expansion ==
The union soon expanded to represent transit workers in other eastern cities, such as Philadelphia and Boston, Massachusetts, and beyond, in Chicago, San Francisco, Akron, Ohio, and Louisville, Kentucky. The Philadelphia organizing drive, held during World War II, was especially difficult: the incumbent union, the Philadelphia Rapid Transit Employees Union, and the Amalgamated Association, TWU's AFL rival, both seized on the resistance of many white employees to government-ordered elimination of job discrimination against blacks to argue that a vote for TWU "is a vote for Negroes to get your jobs". The AFL's organizers disrupted TWU meetings and in a few cases beat up TWU supporters. The TWU nonetheless won the election on March 14, 1944, and soon entered into a collective bargaining agreement covering 9,000 workers.

The uproar over integration did not go away, however, after the election; on the contrary, some of the leaders of the PRTEU, which now represented only the company's clerical employees, called a strike that managed to shut down the transit company's operations, despite the opposition of the TWU, when the company began training eight black workers as motormen. The Roosevelt administration, faced with a strike that threatened to interfere with war production and exasperated by the seeming indifference of the company and local government, sent in troops to guard and, if necessary, operate the system and threatened to draft the strikers. The strike collapsed two weeks later, on August 17, 1944, after the government arrested the strike leaders,

The union also began representing utility workers outside the transit companies when the Brooklyn Union Gas Company employees voted to join it; it lost most of its opportunities to organize in this area several years later, however, when the CIO gave the newly formed Utility Workers of America jurisdiction over this industry.

In 1945 the TWU expanded its jurisdiction to pursue the ramp service employees of Pan American Airways, then the largest airline in the United States, in Miami. The union soon followed up by organizing mechanics, engineers, flight attendants and other employees at Pan Am, mechanics and fleet service workers at American Airlines, and employees at a number of other airlines and maintenance contractors.

TWU's Railroad Division was originally set up in 1943 as an organizing committee by the CIO. It first established itself at the Pennsylvania Railroad. The committee voted overwhelmingly to merge with TWU in September 1954. The TWU led a strike against the Pennsylvania in 1960.

== Breaking with the Communist Party ==
The pressure on Communist Party-led unions intensified after the end of World War II. These pressures fell especially hard on the TWU: the government arrested Santo for immigration law violations and began proceedings to deport him. At the same time, Quill found the Communist Party's political line increasingly hard to take, since it required him to oppose a subway fare increase that he considered necessary for wage increases in 1947, while the Communist Party's support for the candidacy of Henry Wallace threatened to split the CIO. When William Z. Foster, then the general secretary of the CPUSA, told him that the party was prepared to split the CIO to form a third federation and that he might be the logical choice for its leader, Quill decided to break his ties to the Communist Party instead.

Quill applied the same energy to his campaign to drive his former allies out of the union that he had during the union's organizing drives of the 1930s. He was able to enlist the city, in the form of Mayor William O'Dwyer, in his support, winning a large wage increase for subway workers in 1948 that cemented his standing with the membership. After a few inconclusive internal battles, Quill prevailed in 1949, purging not only the officers who had opposed him, but much of the union's staff, down to its secretarial employees.

== Postwar controversies ==
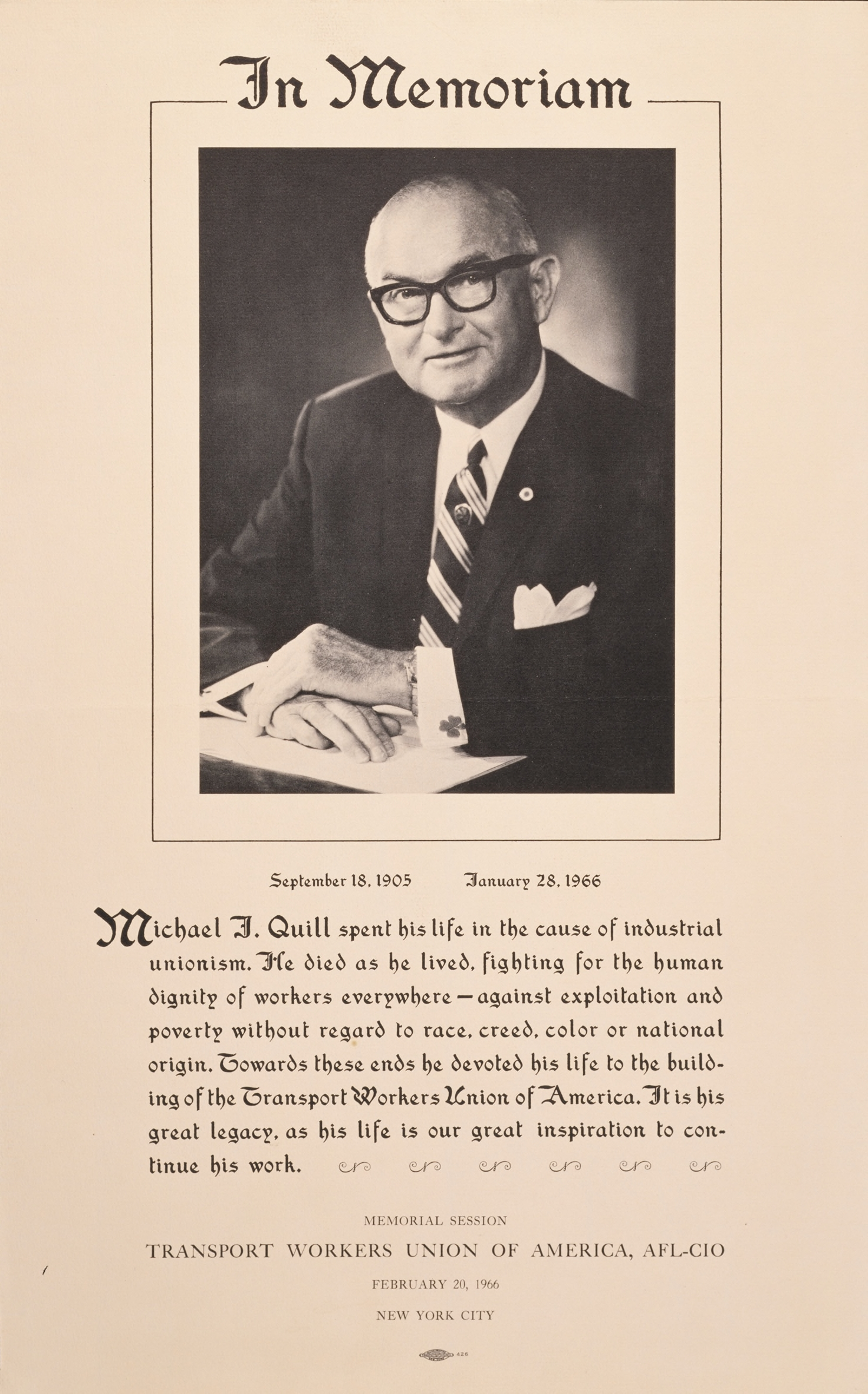
Memorial poster for Mike Quill, 1966

Quill and the TWU became key figures in New York City politics in the 1950s. Quill had been elected to the City Council in both the 1930s and 1940s as a candidate of the American Labor Party, but exerted even more influence after the war when he became head of the New York City's CIO City Council and a major figure in New York City politics. He was a key supporter of Robert F. Wagner Jr.'s campaign for mayor of New York and became a lightning rod, based on his radical past, for Wagner's Republican opponent and unfavorable press attention. While the union repeatedly threatened to take the subway workers out on strike, it managed to settle with the Wagner administration short of a strike on each occasion.

The TWU did not have the same success with the administration of John V. Lindsay, who took office in 1966. Lindsay decided to take on the TWU, provoking a twelve-day strike. The world's largest subway and bus systems, serving eight million people daily, came to a complete halt. The City obtained an injunction prohibiting the strike and succeeded in imprisoning Quill and even other leaders of the TWU and the Amalgamated Association, which joined in the stoppage, for contempt of court.

Quill did not waver, saying that the judge could "drop dead in his black robes", and successfully held out for a sizeable wage increase for the union. As it turns out, however, the judge survived Quill, who died two days after the union's victory celebration. He was buried after a service at St. Patrick's Cathedral, New York, his casket draped by the Irish tricolour.

Secretary-Treasurer Matthew Guinan succeeded Quill; Douglas MacMahon, who had returned to the union after being purged in 1949, became the new Secretary-Treasurer. The Legislature responded to the 1966 strike by passing the Taylor Law, which prescribed a number of automatic penalties in the event of a public workers' strike. The union was, however, able to use the power it had shown in the 1966 strike to make significant gains in later negotiations with the city.

The TWU has continued to organize airline workers after its first success at Pan Am in 1945, The union continues to face internal challenges from workers within the union, especially skilled machinists, and from external rivals, in particular the Aircraft Mechanics Fraternal Association (AMFA).

== 2000s ==
Local 100, the public transit local representing New York City employees, has always been the largest and most influential local within the union. Rank-and-file opponents of the current national leadership took office on December 13, 2000. Some of their original supporters have, however, broken with the current local leadership to create an organization that remains critical of the local's performance in collective bargaining negotiations.

On December 16, 2005, after failed negotiations with the Metropolitan Transportation Authority (MTA) of New York City, the Local 100 of the TWU announced it would halt operations on bus and subway lines. The strike began on December 19. The strike, which was opposed by the international leadership of the TWU, was illegal, in violation of New York state's Taylor Law. A court ordered the TWU to pay fines of $1 million for each day that workers were on strike. The strike officially ended on December 22, 2005.

On April 10, 2006, Justice Theodore T. Jones sentenced Local 100 President Roger Toussaint to ten days in jail and a week later, the union was fined 2.5 million dollars and the automatic deduction of dues from all members was suspended.

== Expansion ==
Transit workers in Long Island, New York, in Akron and Columbus, Ohio, in Omaha, Nebraska, and in Hackensack, New Jersey joined the union around 1941.

After a seven-year struggle to organize, Philadelphia, Pennsylvania joined the TWU in 1944; Houston, Texas in 1947, and San Francisco, California in 1950. Ann Arbor, Michigan and Miami, Florida joined much later.

Expansion also came in the form of other industries, namely, the railroads, air transportation; public utility and university service employees also joined the union.

In 1941 Brooklyn Union Gas employees joined, followed by the blue collar workers of Columbia University two years later.

In 1945 the workers of Pan American World Airways joined the TWU with the union's successful negotiation of a collective bargaining agreement, three years in the making. Workers of American Airlines joined a year later, in 1946.

In 1954 members of the United Railroad Workers Organizing Committee, formed in 1943 by the old CIO, voted to join the TWU. Today the union represents employees of many other railroad companies, including Conrail, Amtrak, SEPTA, Metro North, and PATH.

== List of International Union presidents ==
- Michael J. Quill, 1934–1966
- Matthew Guinan, 1966–1979
- William G. Lindner, 1979–1985
- John E. Lawe, 1985–1989
- George E. Leitz, 1989–1993
- Sonny Hall, 1993–2004
- Michael O'Brien, 2004–2006
- James Little, 2006–2013
- Harry Lombardo, 2013–2017
- John Samuelsen, 2017–present

== See also ==
- Communists in the U.S. Labor Movement (1919–1937)
- Communists in the U.S. Labor Movement (1937–1950)
- 1966 New York City transit strike
- 1980 New York City transit strike
- 2005 New York City transit strike
