= William Gillen =

William Aloysius Gillen (1918 or 1919 – April 1, 1995) was an American labor union leader.

Born in Philadelphia, Gillen served with the United States Army in Europe during World War II. After the war, he returned to Pennsylvania and worked in a factory, then later became managing director of the Pop Warner Little Scholars program. In 1955, he was appointed as president of the Insurance Workers of America union.

As leader of the union, Gillen organized a merger with the rival Insurance Agents' International Union, forming the Insurance Workers' International Union. He was elected as secretary-treasurer of the new union, then defeated the incumbent to become its president in 1965. He also served on the general board of the AFL-CIO, and acted as a mediator and lecturer for the federation.

Gillen stood down as leader of the union in 1976, to become assistant director of the George Meany Center for Labor Studies. He retired in 1984, and settled in Leisure World, Maryland, where he died in 1995.

Trade union offices
| Preceded by Richard T. Leonard | President of the Insurance Workers of America; 1955–1959 | Succeeded by Union merged |
| Preceded by Union founded | Secretary-Treasurer of the Insurance Workers' International Union; 1959–1965 | Succeeded by Charles G. Heisel |
| Preceded by George A. Rollins | President of the Insurance Workers' International Union; 1965–1976 | Succeeded by Joseph Pollack |
| Preceded by William Pachler; Jerry Wurf | AFL-CIO delegate to the Trades Union Congress; 1968; With: Herman D. Kenin | Succeeded by Kenneth J. Brown; C. L. Dennis |
