= Railway Labor Executives' Association =

RLEA
- Railway Labor Executives' Association
- Founded: August 18, 1926
- Dissolved: January 1997
- Headquarters: Railway Labor Building, 4001st Street NW, Washington, D.C.
- Location: United States
- Affiliations: American Federation of Labor (1926–1955); AFL–CIO (1955–1997)

Railway Labor Executives' Association (RLEA) was a federation of rail transport labor unions in the United States and Canada, often known as the railroad brotherhoods. It was founded in 1926 with the purpose of acting as a legislative lobbying and policy advisory body. At times, it played a prominent role in setting rail transport policy in the U.S., and was party to six U.S. Supreme Court cases. It disbanded in January 1997, with representation, collective bargaining, and legislative lobbying assumed by the newly formed Rail Division of the AFL–CIO Transportation Trades Department.

The RLEA was distinct from the Cooperating Railway Labor Organizations (CRLO), a separate association organized in 1991 to serve as an oversight body for the health, welfare, and pension funds established under federal law for railway employees.

== Early history ==
The Railway Labor Executives' Association (RLEA) was formed August 16–18, 1926, in Washington, D.C. The membership of the association was the president (or his or her representative) of each member union, and each union received a single vote in the organization's decision-making processes regardless of its size. The president of the Railway Employes' Department, a division of the American Federation of Labor (AFL; and later the AFL–CIO) was also a member and had a vote. The organization was voluntary, which meant that no member was bound by its decisions. However, members were required to submit (for informational purposes only) any federal legislative proposal which might significantly impact the other RLEA member unions. The organization's first chairman (also sometimes called its president) was David B. Robertson of the Brotherhood of Locomotive Firemen & Enginemen. In 1932, Robertson stepped down to devote more time to his union, and Alexander F. Whitney, President of the Brotherhood of Railroad Trainmen, was elected his successor.

Even though the RLEA did not bargain collectively itself, it played a major role in labor negotiations throughout the 1930s. During the decade, the association had about 21 institutional union members. Its chief counsel was Donald Richberg, a noted attorney who helped write the Railway Labor Act of 1926. In 1932, it acted as a coordinating body for unions engaged in national master contract negotiations, and helped the unions stave off major cuts. Over the next several years, it continued to coordinate collective bargaining strategy, and by 1935 the unions had restored the wage cuts incurred in 1932. No additional cuts were made throughout the remainder of the Great Depression. In 1933, the RLEA secured an amendment to the Emergency Railroad Transportation Act (ERTA) of 1933 which required national railroads to limit layoffs due to consolidation. When this amendment expired in June 1936, RLEA worked with its members to negotiate a five-year collective bargaining agreement (the so-called "Washington Job Protection Agreement") which inserted the ERTA labor provisions into the unions' contracts. In 1940, these contracts clauses were enacted into law as part of the Transportation Act of 1940.

From 1935 to 1940, George Harrison, President of the Brotherhood of Railway Clerks, served as the RLEA's chairman.

The 1930s were also a time of legislative achievements for the association. The Railway Labor Executives' Association was the primary organization pushing for railroad retirement legislation, which was first enacted in 1934. In addition to the layoff provisions mentioned above, the Emergency Railroad Transportation Act of 1933 also contained provisions (again drafted by Richberg) which outlawed "yellow dog contracts" and guaranteed to railway workers the right to form unions.

== War and post-war years ==
James A. Phillips, President of the Order of Railway Conductors, was elected chairman of the RLEA in 1940. He replaced George Harrison, who resigned. During World War II, the RLEA argued that its members were losing significant amounts of pay due to war-time inflation, and nearly went out on strike in the spring of 1942. But after negotiations with railroad management and President Franklin D. Roosevelt, a National Railway Labor Panel was created in May 1942 to adjudicate labor disputes between the railways and their unions. RLEA members had three of the nine seats on the panel. Later in 1942, the federal Office of Price Administration created a labor policy advisory group on which a representative from the RLEA sat.

After the war, the RLEA played a role in implementation of the Marshall Plan. The Economic Cooperation Administration wanted private groups to play a greater advisory role in the plan's implementation. The RLEA, along with the AFL and the Congress of Industrial Organizations (CIO), met with non-Communist leaders of European trade unions to create a Trade Union Advisory Committee that acted as a policy-making body on labor matters in Western Europe.

The RLEA also had a post-war role in international labor union federation politics. The International Federation of Trade Unions (IFTU) had been formed in 1919 in the wake of World War I as a means of united European labor unions and providing them with a stronger voice in world affairs. The idea behind the international labor federation was that the unions would be able to play a stronger role in anti-war initiatives. Although national labor federations from around the world joined the IFTU, it was dominated by socialist-leaning federations in Europe. The AFL withdrew from the IFTU in 1929 due to the IFTU's left-leaning politics. The IFTU suffered from internal factionalization as trade unions from Nazi Germany came close to dominating it during the 1930s. As Nazi Germany conquered most of Europe in the 1930s, the IFTU's membership plummeted. The IFTU survived as a link to underground trade union freedom-fighter movements during World War II, but dissolved in 1945. The World Federation of Trade Unions (WFTU) was formed in 1945 to replace it. But the WFTU was divided over support for the Marshall Plan. The Marshall Plan's goal was to undercut Communist influence in Western Europe, but many Western European trade unions were Communist-led. As these unions left the WFTU, unions from the Soviet Union and Eastern Bloc countries came to dominate the WFTU. The AFL withdrew from the WFTU as well. The goal of the American government and the AFL did not change, however; both wanted to end communist dominance of international labor bodies. On February 27, 1947, the RLEA voted to affiliate with the International Transport Workers' Federation (ITWF), an independent global federation of national transport workers' unions. The RLEA, with 1.2 million members, easily dominated the ITWF. In September 1947, the RLEA won a major battle within the ITWF when the ITWF executive committee declined to join the Soviet-dominated WFTU. The ITWF decision was a major victory for the AFL and the Truman administration, for it prevented the WFTU from creating a critical mass of union membership and claiming a moral high ground vis-a-vis the AFL. Just 18 months later, the AFL and other non-communist national Western trade union federations formed the International Confederation of Free Trade Unions (ICFTU). Over time, the WFTU withered and the ICFTU was ascendant.

At the time the RLEA was formed, none of its member unions admitted African Americans as members. In 1948, the Brotherhood of Sleeping Car Porters hired attorney Joseph L. Rauh Jr. to help it win disputes with RLEA members over which union had jurisdiction over various types of work on the railroads. As the Brotherhood of Sleeping Car Porters won more of these disputes, the RLEA was put in a position of either accepting the African American union into its ranks or losing its economic clout vis-a-vis the railroads. To put even more pressure on the RLEA, Rauh filed a complaint with the United States Department of Labor alleging that the RLEA discriminated against African American workers (which was illegal under federal law). In 1950, the RLEA capitulated and accepted the Brotherhood of Sleeping Car Porters as a member union.

George E. Leighty, President of the Order of Railroad Telegraphers, was elected RLEA chairman in 1950, and remained president until 1960.

On December 16, 1950, the RLEA joined with the AFL, CIO, International Association of Machinists to form the United Labor Policy Committee. The committee's goal was to monitor government policy-making to avoid what labor unions perceived was a pro-business policy bias in during World War II. During the economic crisis which occurred during the Korean War, the United Labor Policy Committee oversaw the labor representatives on the Wage Stabilization Board (WSB), which regulated wages in the defense industry in the United States. During the buildup to the 1952 steel strike, the WSB imposed nationwide wage controls on January 26, 1951. Labor representatives on the board, who opposed wholesale wage controls, were outvoted nine to three. On February 16, the Wage Stabilization Board issued Wage Regulation 6 which permitted a 10 percent increase in wages for those workers who had not negotiated a wage increase in the last six months. The regulation was based on the "Little Steel formula" of World War II. At the instruction of the RLEA and other members of the United Labor Policy Committee, the labor representatives on the WSB resigned in protest. Unwilling to alienate labor by imposing wage controls involuntarily, President Truman reconstituted the WSB with a greatly enlarged membership and powers and new authority to report directly to the president.

== Late 20th century ==
The RLEA's importance in national labor affairs fell along with the significant decline of the railway industry in the national economy. The organization was also roiled by internal dissent and disaffiliations. In the late 1940s, the Brotherhood of Locomotive Engineers, Brotherhood of Railroad Trainmen, and the Order of Railway Conductors all quit the organization in disputes over various issues in collective bargaining and political action. In 1950, the Brotherhood of Locomotive Firemen and Enginemen disaffiliated from the RLEA, and did not rejoin it until December 1954. By the mid-1950s, the Brotherhood of Locomotive Engineers had rejoined the RLEA, but disaffiliated again in November 1964. Just two months later, the International Association of Machinists quit as well.

Faced with rapidly declining membership and severe financial difficulties in the rail industry, the RLEA abandoned its 45-year-old policy opposing public ownership of rail transport companies. Government ownership of the railroads, the RLEA now said, was the only way to ensure that they would continue to exist. The RLEA's policy change helped lead to the creation of Amtrak in 1971 and Conrail in 1976.

But membership changes continued to roil the RLEA. In 1969, the United Transportation Union (formerly the Brotherhood of Railroad Trainmen), the Brotherhood of Maintenance of Way Employes, the Brotherhood of Railway and Airline Clerks, the Hotel and Restaurant Employes Union, and the Seafarers International Union all disaffiliated from the RLEA and form the Congress of Railway Unions. The Congress of Railway Unions had the same purpose as the RLEA, but generally attempted to be a leaner organization and pursued different policy and collective bargaining goals.

In 1972, the RLEA had 20 member unions, including nine railway unions and 11 with other unions with small numbers of members working for railways or which were not affiliated with the AFL–CIO. Three years later, the Congress of Railway Unions dissolved and its member unions rejoined the RLEA. But the decline of the railroads left the RLEA's member unions with fewer and fewer members. The AFL-CIO disbanded its Railway Employes Department in October 1980.

The RLEA began pursuing new tactics as a way of enhancing its collective bargaining and legislative power. Throughout the 1980s and 1990s, the RLEA sought to purchase a Class I or Class II railroad as a means of gaining entry into the decision-making bodies of the railroad industry and being taken seriously as a railroad industry player in Congress. In 1983, the RLEA made an offer to buy Conrail from the U.S. government. The RLEA said it represented 36,000 Conrail workers who were members of 16 Conrail unions, and by July 1983 the RLEA's offer was the only one for the railroad. The RLEA bid for Conrail generated intense public debate and discussion, even as other bidders for the railroad emerged. In June 1984, as the bidding wore on, the value of the RLEA's bid was revealed to be $2 billion. But in September 1983, the list of potential buyers was reduced to three, and the RLEA was not a finalist for the purchase of the railroad.

The failure to purchase Conrail did not discourage the RLEA. In 1987, it made a bid for the Southern Pacific Railroad. The RLEA bid $750 million for the railroad. But once again, the labor federation was unsuccessful. Rio Grande Industries, which owned the Denver and Rio Grande Western Railroad, won the bidding. A year later, the RLEA made an unsuccessful $59 million bid for the Pittsburgh and Lake Erie Railroad, a Class III railroad. In 1989, it made an unsuccessful bid worth more than $658 million for the Class I Chicago and North Western System.

A nationwide rail strike occurred in April 1991. But Congress invoked the provisions of the Railway Labor Act and less than 24 hours into the strike passed legislation shutting the strike down. The handling of the strike led to widespread unrest among union members. Richard Kilroy, president of the RLEA and president of the Transportation Communications International Union (formerly the Brotherhood of Railway and Airline Clerks) was defeated for re-election by Robert A. Scardelletti in mid-August 1991. Scardelletti immediately withdrew his union from membership in the RLEA. Kilroy was forced to step down as RLEA president due to his election loss, and Edward P. McEntee, President of the International Brotherhood of Electrical Workers, was elected the organization's new president. Less than a month later, Fred Hardin, President of the United Transportation Union (UTU; which had been ejected by the RLEA in 1989 for raiding other unions for membership) was defeated for re-election by G. Thomas DuBose. DuBose led the UTU to rejoin the RLEA in April 1992.

RLEA won a major court victory in 1994, however. By that year, the RLEA represented 12 railway labor unions, but just 232,000 railroad employees. The Railway Labor Act (as amended) established the National Mediation Board (NMB) to adjudicate collective bargaining disputes between unions and employers in the railroad industry. But in 1989, the NMB claimed authority over inter-union jurisdictional disputes as well, and began using this authority to reduce the number of unions each railroad was forced to deal with. One behalf of its member unions, the RLEA sued. In Railway Labor Executives' Association v. National Mediation Board, 29 F.3d 655 (1994, amend'd July 20, 1994), Judge Ruth Bader Ginsburg, writing for a 2-to-1 majority of the Court of Appeals for the District of Columbia Circuit, concluded that the NMB did have the legal authority to adjudicate jurisdictional disputes.

The court victory did little to quell internal dissent in the RLEA. In May 1994, the UTU disaffiliated yet again. The RLEA still represented the Brotherhood of Maintenance of Way Employes, the American Train Dispatchers unit of the Brotherhood of Locomotive Engineers, Brotherhood of Railroad Signalmen, the Sheet Metal Workers International Association, the United Association (which represented boilermakers), the International Association of Fire Fighters, and UNITE HERE (representing railroad restaurant employees).

The RLEA disbanded in January 1997, with representation, collective bargaining, and legislative lobbying assumed by the newly formed Rail Division of the AFL–CIO Transportation Trades Department.

== Court cases ==
The Railway Labor Executives' Association has been party to six cases which were decided by the Supreme Court of the United States. These are:

- ICC v. Railway Labor Executives' Assn., 315 U.S. 373 (1942) – The Supreme Court upheld the RLEA's claim that the Interstate Commerce Commission (ICC) had the authority to impose conditions to benefit of employees who are harmed by a railroad's abandonment of track.
- Railway Labor Executives' Association v. United States, 379 U.S. 199 (1964) – The Southern Railway had acquired the Central of Georgia Railway, and the RLEA argued that the ICC had failed to protect employee rights in approving the takeover. The Supreme Court held that the ICC's order was unclear, and remanded the case for further proceedings at the ICC.
- Railway Labor Executives' Association v. Gibbons, 455 U.S. 457 (1982) – The Chicago, Rock Island and Pacific Railroad was in bankruptcy, and had petitioned for liquidation. On May 31, 1980, the President of the United States signed Public Law 96-254 (94 Stat. 399, 45 U.S.C. 1001 et seq.), which required the railroad to make payments to its employees under existing collective bargaining agreements. Two days later, a federal district court authorized the liquidation of the railroad, which would have triggered the legislation. The Supreme Court held that postponing the liquidation created an undue burden on the railroad, and allowed the liquidation to go forward without the provisions of P.L. 96-254.
- Skinner v. Railway Labor Executives Association, 489 US 602 (1989) – The Supreme Court held against the RLEA, and said that random drug testing is permissible for employees in safety sensitive positions.
- Consolidated Rail Corporation v. Railway Labor Executives' Association, 491 U.S. 299 (1989) – Conrail sought to institute drug testing for all its employees. The RLEA asked that the Adjustment Board of the NMB adjudicate the matter, but Conrail said the dispute did not fall under the RLA's jurisdiction. The Supreme Court said it did.
- Pittsburgh & Lake Erie Railroad Company v. Railway Labor Executives' Association, 491 U.S. 490 (1989) – The Pittsburgh & Lake Erie Railroad sold its assets to CSX Transportation and refused to bargain with the RLEA's member unions over the sale. The Supreme Court held that there was a duty to bargain (but not over the sale itself), but that this duty to bargain ended when the sale was complete. Lower courts had enjoined the union from striking, but the Supreme Court said it was unclear if there were grounds to do so. It remanded the strike issue back to the lower courts.

== List of presidents ==
The following is an incomplete list of the presidents of the RLEA.

- David B. Robertson, 1926–1932
- Alexander F. Whitney, 1932–1935
- George McGregor Harrison, 1935–1940
- James A. Phillips, 1940–1941(?)
- George McGregor Harrison, 1941
- Thomas C. Cashen, 1942–1943
- Harry W. Fraser, 1943
- Thomas C. Cashen, 1943–1945
- Harry W. Fraser, 1947–1948
- George Earle Leighty, 1950–1969
- C. J. Chamberlain, 1970–1977
- John F. Peterpaul, 1977–1980
- Fred J. Kroll, 1980–1981
- Frank A. Hardin, 1981–1984
- Ole Berge, 1984–1985
- Richard I. Kilroy, 1986–1991
- Edward P. McEntee, 1991–1992
- Ron McLaughlin, 1993–1994?
- William D. "Dan" Pickett, 1996–1997

== Bibliography ==
- Anderson, Jervis. A. Philip Randolph: A Biographical Portrait. Berkeley, Calif.: University of California Press, 1986.
- Arnesen, Eric. Brotherhoods of Color: Black Railroad Workers and the Struggle for Equality. Cambridge, Mass.: Harvard University Press, 2001.
- Bureau of Labor Statistics. Directory of National Unions and Employee Associations. Washington, D.C.: U.S. Bureau of Labor Statistics, 1972.
- Dubofsky, Warren and Van Tine, Warren. John L. Lewis: A Biography. Reprint ed. Champaign, Ill.: University of Illinois Press, 1992.
- Galenson, Walter. The CIO Challenge to the AFL: A History of the American Labor Movement, 1935-1941. Cambridge, Mass.: Harvard University Press, 1960.
- Hidy, Ralph W. The Great Northern Railway: A History. Minneapolis: University of Minnesota Press, 2004.
- Hogan, Michael J. The Marshall Plan: America, Britain, and the Reconstruction of Western Europe, 1947-1952. New York: Cambridge University Press, 1987.
- Latham, Earl. The Politics of Railroad Coordination, 1933-1936. Cambridge, Mass.: Harvard University Press, 1959.
- Lichtenstein, Nelson. Labor's War at Home: The CIO in World War II. Philadelphia, Pa.: Temple University Press, 2003.
- Marcus, Maeva. Truman and the Steel Seizure Case: The Limits of Presidential Power. New York: Columbia University Press, 1977.
- Parish, Michael E. Citizen Rauh: An American Liberal's Life in Law and Politics. Ann Arbor, Mich.: University of Michigan Press, 2010.
- Rand School of Social Science. The American Labor Year Book. New York: Rand School of Social Science, 1927.
- Rayback, Joseph. A History of American Labor. New York: Simon and Schuster, 1966.
- Wilson, Carter A. Racism: From Slavery to Advanced Capitalism. Thousand Oaks, Calif.: Sage, 1996.
