= Michael Fox (unionist) =

Scottish-born American labor union leader

Michael Fox (1900 or 1901 – June 11, 1978) was a Scottish-born American labor union leader.

== Early life and education ==
Born in Scotland, Fox completed an apprenticeship as an electrician, and joined the Labour Party and a trade union. In 1924, he emigrated to the United States, settling in New York City. There, he worked as an electrician on construction projects, before, in 1927, moving to work for the New York Central Railroad. This led him to join the International Brotherhood of Electrical Workers.

== Career ==
Fox served successively as secretary, president, and chairman of his local union. During World War II, he served on the War Manpower Commission, and he also developed an apprenticeship scheme for the railroad.

In 1946, Fox was appointed as assistant to the president of the Railway Employes' Department of the American Federation of Labor (AFL). He was elected as secretary-treasurer of the department in 1949, and then as president in 1961. From 1951, he also served as vice chairman of the Railway Labor Executives Association.

== Later life and death ==
He retired in 1969, and died nine years later.

Trade union offices
Preceded by J. M. Burns	Secretary-Treasurer of the Railway Employes' Department; 1949–1961	Succeeded by Howard Pickett
Preceded by Fred N. Aten	President of the Railway Employes' Department; 1961–1969	Succeeded by James E. Yost
Preceded by Paul L. Phillips; James Suffridge	American Federation of Labor delegate to the Trades Union Congress; 1955; With: C. J. Haggerty	Succeeded by Emil Rieve; William F. Schnitzler
