= Warren Fairley =

American labor union leader

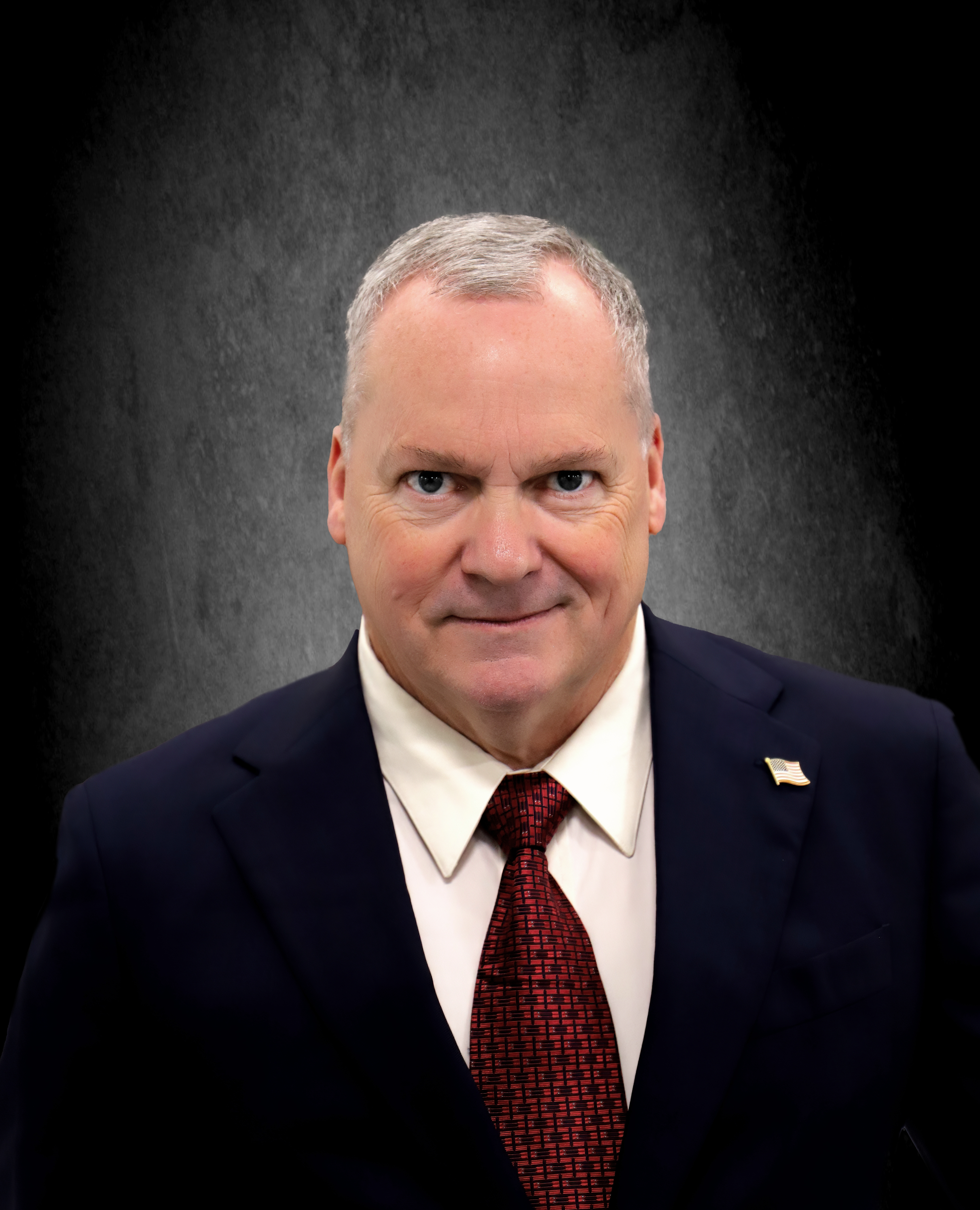
Fairley, in 2023

Warren Fairley is an American labor union leader.

Fairley worked at Ingalls Shipbuilding in Pascagoula, Mississippi, and joined the International Brotherhood of Boilermakers, Iron Ship Builders, Blacksmiths, Forgers and Helpers (IBB) in 1990. In 1996, he was elected as business manager of his local union, and then in 1999 he became an international representative for the union. In 2003, he became deputy director of the union's Shipbuilding and Marine Division, and then director in 2005. He was appointed as vice president for the industrial sector in 2007, and from 2010 covered the south east region.

In 2018, Fairley was elected as a vice president of the AFL-CIO. He also held posts in the IndustriALL Global Union. He retired in February 2023. In June, the union's president, Newton B. Jones faced allegations of financial malfeasance. The executive removed Jones from his post, and persuaded Fairley to come out of retirement and serve as president until a new election could be held.

In November of 2026, the FDIC banned Fairley "from the banking industry for life..." He was the former Bank of Labor chairman and pleaded guilty to racketeering and embezzlement charges for participating in a $20 million corruption scheme that involved spending union money for personal benefit.

Trade union offices
Preceded by Newton B. Jones	President of the International Brotherhood of Boilermakers; 2023–2024	Succeeded by Timothy Simmons
