= National Railroad Hall of Fame =

Coordinates: 40°56′52.1″N 90°21′57.2″W

The US National Railroad Hall of Fame was established in 2003 and recognized by Congressional resolutions in 2003 and 2004. The main offices of the hall of fame are in Galesburg, Illinois.

The National Railroad Hall of Fame has three categories for inductees:

1) 1800-1865: Birth and Development
2) 1866-1945: Golden Era
3) 1946-Present: Modern Era

== 1800-1865: Birth and Development ==
| Inductee | Notes |
|---|---|
| Horatio Allen | |
| Matthias W. Baldwin | |
| Peter Cooper | |
| Stephen A. Douglas | |
| William Washington Gordon | |
| Herman Haupt | |
| Abraham Lincoln | |
| Charles Minot | |
| William B. Ogden | |
| George Pullman | |
| Col. John Stevens | |
| Henry Huttleston Rogers | |

== 1866-1945: Golden Era ==
| Inductee | Notes |
|---|---|
| Peter M. Arthur | |
| Andrew Jackson Beard | |
| Grenville M. Dodge | |
| Henry M. Flagler | |
| Sandford Fleming | |
| Edward H. Harriman | |
| James J. Hill | |
| Cyrus K. Holliday | |
| Elijah McCoy | |
| J.P. Morgan | |
| The City of Nashville and West Nashville | |
| Willard Saxby Townsend | |
| Cornelius Vanderbilt | |
| George Westinghouse | |
| James Buchanan Eads | |
| Edward G. Budd | |

== 1946-Present: Modern Era ==
| Inductee | Notes |
|---|---|
| John W. Barriger, III | |
| Max and Thelma Biegert | |
| Ralph Budd | |
| W. Graham Claytor, Jr. | |
| L. Stanley Crane | |
| Mike Haverty | |
| Jervis Langdon, Jr. | |
| Louis W. Menk | |
| Paul M. Tellier | |
| John C. Kenefick | |
| Alfred E. Perlman | |
| Joshua Lionel Cowen | |
| D. William Brosnan | |
| Charles F. Kettering | |
| Asa Philip Randolph | |
