= Order of Sleeping Car Conductors =

- Merged: Order of Railway Conductors
- Founded: February 20, 1918
- Dissolved: 1942
- Headquarters: Kansas City, Missouri
- Location(s): United States and Canada

The Order of Sleeping Car Conductors (OSCC) was a labor union that represented white sleeping car conductors in the United States and Canada between 1918 and 1942, when it merged with the Order of Railway Conductors.

== Foundation ==
During World War I (1914-1918) the Federal government took control of the railroads in the United States and encouraged railroad workers to organize. The Order of Sleeping Car Employees was established on 20 February 1918 in Kansas City, Missouri to undertake collective bargaining for wages and working conditions in the United States and Canada. At the first triennial convention in 1919 the name was changed to the Order of Sleeping Car Conductors. The union was headed by a president, with offices in Kansas City, Missouri. Members had to be white males, sober and industrious, sound in body and mind, and employed as a sleeping car or parlor car conductor for at least ten days before joining.

== History ==
After the war the Pullman Company tried to establish an Employee Representation Plan (ERP) in the sleeping car service as an alternative to a union, although employees were rightly suspicious about the level of job protection an ERP would provide. Pullman could not get the sleeping car conductors to join the ERP, and eventually recognized the Order of Sleeping Car Conductors. By doing so, they avoided having the sleeping car conductors join the Order of Railway Conductors. The company signed an agreement with the OSCC that took effect on 1 January 1922. The contract confirmed that sleeping car conductors must be white males, and that they had the right to supervise and discipline porters and maids. According to the conductors, "the white traveling public, especially women, were unsafe alone in a car with a Negro porter." In response to OSCC propaganda several southern states passed laws requiring white Pullman conductors to be in charge of sleeping cars in their jurisdictions.

Because the order did not admit blacks, in 1925 A. Philip Randolph began organizing the Brotherhood of Sleeping Car Porters (BSCP), the first African-American labor union to gain a collective bargaining agreement, and the first to be chartered by the American Federation of Labor (AFL). In June 1934 Congress amended the Watson-Parker Railway Labor Act so it explicitly covered non-operating train personnel and sleeping car companies. The new act was sponsored by Senator Clarence Dill, who thought Pullman porters and maids should be black. A jurisdictional dispute between the Order of Sleeping Car Conductors and the Brotherhood of Sleeping Car Porters had to be settled by the American Federation of Labor, but the effect was to quadruple membership in the BSCP within a year.

In 1934 the AFL Executive Council gave the OSCC jurisdiction over Pullman porters. A. Philip Randolph argued strongly in the American Federation of Labor against the discriminatory practices of the OSCC. He said, "the Sleeping Car Conductors Union is saturated with race prejudice as shown by a clause in its constitution barring Negroes from membership." He went on, "If the Executive Council and the A.F. of L. Convention upholds the right of jurisdiction of the Order of Sleeping Car Conductors over sleeping car porters, the Brotherhood will have no other honorable alternative before it but to withdraw from the A.F. of L." In August 1935 the AFL Executive Council backed down, although it took almost a year for independence of the porters from the conductors to be formalized.

As of 1936 membership of the OSCC was about 2,200. The combined conductor-porter job represented by the Order of Sleeping Car Conductors was gradually being eliminated. The railroad companies used the practice of "running in charge" to employ black porters as conductors on short or designated routes, paying them more than the wage for porters but much less than the wage for a conductor. In 1940 the Order of Sleeping Car Conductors asked Congress to legislate to outlaw this practice on interstate sleeping cars. The bill was sponsored by Senator Sherman Minton. The BSCP did not take part in the debate, but the Pullman Company "stirred up the porters in opposition to this Bill by a representation that it was an attack upon their race." Black religious and civic groups protested, and eventually Minton withdrew the bill.

== Dissolution ==
In 1942 the National Mediation Board monitored an election in which the conductors voted to join the Order of Railway Conductors (ORC). Harry W. Fraser, president of the Order of Railway Conductors, encouraged the amalgamation. The OSCC was absorbed into the ORC in 1942.
