= Herman D. Kenin =

Herman D. Kenin (1901–1970) was an American musician, orchestra leader, and trade unionist.

Kenin was born in Vineland, New Jersey, on October 26, 1901, but in August 1911, his family moved to Portland, Oregon. In the early 1920s he secured a position playing violin in the up-and-coming dance band led by George Olsen. In 1925 Olsen and some of his orchestra members left Portland for Los Angeles, to accept a hotel job there. Kenin and several other band members stayed behind to fulfill Olsen's engagement at the Portland Hotel. Within a year Kenin had secured a new position as band-leader at the Multnomah Hotel. The group came to the attention of Victor Records' West Coast office in Oakland. Victor sent their mobile recording equipment to Portland and recorded Kenin's Multnomah Hotel Orchestra, the first recordings made in Portland. The records proved to be a success, and subsequently Kenin accepted an engagement at the Ambassador Hotel in Los Angeles, continuing to make more sides for Victor Records.

He was head of American Federation of Musicians and later was a leader at American Federation of Labor. His work landed him on the master list of Nixon political opponents.

Kenin died on July 21, 1970

Trade union offices
Preceded by James C. Petrillo	President of the American Federation of Musicians; 1958–1970	Succeeded by Hal C. Davis
Preceded by William Pachler; Jerry Wurf	AFL-CIO delegate to the Trades Union Congress; 1968; With: William Gillen	Succeeded by Kenneth J. Brown; C. L. Dennis
