= Fred J. Kroll =

Fred J. Kroll (October 29, 1935 – July 30, 1981) was an American labor union leader.

Born in Philadelphia, Kroll attended the Roman Catholic High School before becoming a clerk with the Pennsylvania Railroad. In 1954, he joined the Brotherhood of Railway and Airline Clerks (BRAC), and he was elected as chair of his local in 1961. In 1970, he was elected as secretary-treasurer of the union, and the following year also as chair of the Penn Central System.

Kroll became a vice-president of BRAC in 1975, and then in 1976 stood to become president of the union, against incumbent C. L. Dennis. It became known that Dennis wished his son to succeed him, something which was unpopular with union members. Kroll defeated Dennis in the election, after which he was badly beaten by a group of supporters of Dennis' son.

As leader of the union, Kroll was known as a strong negotiator and for increasing job security. In 1978, he was elected as the youngest ever vice-president and executive member of the AFL-CIO. He soon became ill with leukemia, and died of the disease at the age of 45.

Trade union offices
Preceded by C. L. Dennis	President of the Brotherhood of Railway and Airline Clerks; 1976–1981	Succeeded by Richard I. Kilroy
Preceded by John F. Peterpaul	President of the Railway Labor Executives' Association; 1980–1981	Succeeded by Frank A. Hardin
