= Jack Otero =

Joaquin Francisco "Jack" Otero (April 3, 1934 – November 9, 2016) was a Cuban-born American labor union leader.

Born in Havana in Cuba, Otero emigrated to the United States in 1953, settling in St. Louis. He found work with the Illinois Terminal Railroad as a clerk, and joined the Brotherhood of Railway and Airline Clerks (BRAC). In 1959, he was elected as general chair of the railroad's board of adjustment. In 1961, he was appointed as director of the Latin American and Caribbean Region of the International Transport Workers' Federation (ITF), rapidly rebuilding the moribund region.

Otero returned to work for BRAC in 1966, as assistant director of its international affairs department, moving up to director in 1968. In 1971, he was elected as a vice-president of the union, and in 1977 he was additionally elected as an executive member of the ITF.

Otero campaigned for Hispanic workers to be represented on the executive council of the AFL-CIO, and in 1991, he was elected as the federation's first Hispanic vice-president. He retired from the union in 1993, becoming head of the U.S. Bureau of International Labor Affairs.
