= Harry Lombardo =

Harry Lombardo (born 1948 or 1949) is an American former labor union leader.

Lombardo became a bus cleaner in Philadelphia in 1972, and joined the Transport Workers Union of America (TWU). He came to lead the union's Local 234, which he took through a 14-day strike against SEPTA, during which union members were arrested for driving at 20 miles per hour on the Schuylkill Expressway, something Lombardo blamed on police blocking off traffic following a rally. He eventually became executive vice president of the international union.

In 2013, Lombardo was elected as president of the TWU. As leader, he prioritized restructuring the union, to ensure that it was not running at a loss; resolving a dispute among flight attendants at Allegiant Air; and cautiously backing a proposed merger between American Airways and US Airways. He was also elected as a vice-president of the AFL-CIO. He retired in 2017.

Trade union offices
Preceded by James Little	President of the Transport Workers Union of America; 2013–2017	Succeeded by John Samuelsen
