= Harry W. Fraser =

American labor leader

- Born: 7 June 1884; Topeka, Kansas, United States
- Died: 13 May 1950 (aged 65); Chicago, United States
- Occupation: Labor leader
- Known for: President of the Order of Railway Conductors

Harry W. Fraser (7 June 1884 – 13 May 1950) was an American labor leader who was president of the Order of Railway Conductors (ORC) from 1941 to 1950.

== Early years ==
Harry W. Fraser was born on 7 June 1884 at Topeka, Kansas. In 1900 he began work as a railway clerk, and later he became a brakeman and a conductor. In 1929 he was appointed secretary to the president of the Order of Railway Conductors, a railway labor union. He moved on to become chief clerk, deputy president, vice president and finally president of the union.

== Union leader ==
Harry W. Fraser was president of the Order of Railway Conductors of America from 1941 to 1950. During World War II ORC membership increased from 33,000 in 1939 to 37,800 by 1945. Fraser encouraged the Order of Sleeping Car Conductors (OSCC) to join the Order of Railway Conductors during the war. The OSCC amalgamated (merged) with the ORC in 1942. During World War II Fraser was a representative of labor interests on the government's Management-Labor Policy Committee. He served on this committee from 1943 to 1945. He was a member of the national council of Boy Scouts in 1943. Fraser was twice president of the Railway Labor Executives' Association.

Harry W. Fraser suffered a series of heart attacks at the union convention in Chicago. He died at the Illinois Central Hospital on 13 May 1950, aged 65. Roy O. Hughes of Milwaukee was elected his successor.
