= Insurance Workers' International Union =

The Insurance Workers' International Union (IWIU) was a labor union representing workers in the insurance industry in the United States and Canada.

== History ==
The union was established on May 18, 1959, when the Insurance Agents' International Union merged with the Insurance Workers of America. Like both its predecessors, it was chartered by the AFL-CIO. On formation, it had 22,650 members.

In 1966, the union hired an organizer to study the unionization of white collar workers. By 1980, its membership had fallen slightly, to 20,000. On October 1, 1983, the union merged into the United Food and Commercial Workers, to promote the broader organization of clerical workers in the industry.

== Presidents ==
1959: George L. Russ
1963: George A. Rollins
1965: William Gillen
1976: Joseph Pollack
