= Richard I. Kilroy =

American labor union leader (1927–2007)

Richard Ignatius Kilroy (July 31, 1927 – February 10, 2007) was an American labor union leader.

President of labor union BRAC meets with Ted Kennedy in Florida in the 1980s

Kilroy served in the United States Army from 1945 to 1949, then became a block operator on the Pennsylvania Railroad. He joined the Order of Railroad Telegraphers, and rose to become the union's general chairman. In 1969, the union merged into the Brotherhood of Railway and Airline Clerks (BRAC), with Kilroy becoming a divisional vice president. He was later elected as international vice president, and then in 1981 was unanimously elected as president.

Kilroy also served as a vice-president of the AFL-CIO, and as president of the Railway Labor Executives' Association. In 1990, he was elected as the founding president of the Transportation Trades Department, AFL–CIO. However, he was defeated for re-election as president of BRAC in 1991, and as a result, he resigned from his other union posts.

Trade union offices
| Preceded by Fred J. Kroll | President of the Brotherhood of Railway and Airline Clerks; 1981–1991 | Succeeded by Bob Scardelletti |
| Preceded by Ola Berge | President of the Railway Labor Executives' Association; 1986–1991 | Succeeded by Edward P. McEntee |
| Preceded by Department founded | President of the Transportation Trades Department; 1990–1991 | Succeeded by Walter Shea |
