= United Transport Service Employees of America =

The United Transport Service Employees of America (UTSEA) was a labor union representing railroad workers, principally station porters, in the United States.

== History ==
The union was established in May 1937, as the International Brotherhood of Red Caps. Its founding conference was held in January 1938, chaired by A. Philip Randolph of the Brotherhood of Sleeping Car Porters. Its second conference, in January 1940, changed the union's name to the UTSEA.

The union represented workers of all ethnicities, but soon after its formation, a group of white workers withdrew, and it was thereafter principally an African American organization. The Brotherhood of Railway Clerks organized a rival auxiliary group, open only to white workers, and in protest, many locals left the American Federation of Labor. UTSEA chartered these locals, and in June 1942, the national union was chartered by the Congress of Industrial Organizations, at which time, it had around 3,500 members.

The union quickly achieved shorter working hours and seniority rights for station porters. It affiliated to the new AFL-CIO in 1955, and by 1957, its membership had grown to 6,500. However, by 1969, this figure had fallen to just 3,000. On October 1, 1972, it merged into the Brotherhood of Railway Clerks.

== Presidents ==
1937: Willard Saxby Townsend
1957: Eugene E. Frasier
1964: George Sabattie
