= Sonny Hall (unionist) =

American labor union leader (1932–2022)

Harold "Sonny" Hall (January 30, 1932 – January 13, 2022) was an American labor union leader.

Born in the Bronx, Hall joined the United States Marines when he was 16, using his brother's papers. He was discovered and sent home, but later joined the military police, working at a nuclear facility in Albuquerque. After leaving the Army, he returned to New York, becoming a bus cleaner. He was nearly sacked due to poor attendance, but a Transport Workers Union of America representative saved his job, inspiring him to become active in the union. He held various part-time posts in the union before, in 1985, becoming president of its Local 100, and also an international vice president.

As leader of the local, Hall negotiated numerous contracts, and set up the Union Assistance Program to support workers with mental health and addiction issues, following negotiations with Mario Cuomo. He was additionally elected as executive vice president of the international union in 1989, and then as president in 1993. He was also elected as a vice-president of the AFL-CIO in 1995, and as secretary-treasurer of the federation's Transportation Trades Department that year, becoming president of the department in 1998. He retired from the union in 2003, and from the AFL-CIO in 2004.

Trade union offices
Preceded by George E. Leitz	President of the Transport Workers Union of America; 1993–2004	Succeeded by Michael O'Brien
Preceded by V. M. Speakman	Secretary-Treasurer of the Transportation Trades Department; 1995–1998	Succeeded by Edward Wytkind
Preceded by Ron Carey	President of the Transportation Trades Department; 1998–2003	Succeeded by Edward Wytkind
