= Insurance Workers of America =

Labor union

The Insurance Workers of America (IWA) was a labor union representing workers in the insurance industry, in the United States.

The union was founded be the Congress of Industrial Organizations (CIO) on May 1, 1950, as the Insurance and Allied Workers' Organizing Committee. It was intended as a replacement for the United Office and Professional Workers of America, which had recently been expelled from the CIO, and 90% of the members of which worked in the insurance industry. It undertook a series of strikes, and as a result, in 1951 won the right to represent 6,000 workers at John Hancock Financial and Metropolitan Life Insurance. However, it was severely challenged by the rival Insurance Agents' International Union (IAIU), to which it lost 9,000 Prudential Financial workers.

The union affiliated to the new AFL-CIO in 1955, and by 1957, it had 13,000 members. On May 18, 1959, it merged with the IAIU, to form the Insurance Workers' International Union.

== Presidents ==
1950: Allan Haywood
1952: Richard T. Leonard
1955: William Gillen
