= Arthur Maratea =

Arthur Maratea is an American labor union leader.

Maratea began working as a carman on the Long Island Railroad in 1988. The following year, he was promoted to become a telegrapher, and he joined the Transportation Communications International Union (TCU). He was elected as president of his local in 1996 and then became local chair. In 2002, he was elected as general secretary-treasurer of the union's Unit 167, and then as general chairman the year after.

In 2011, Maratea was elected as national vice-president of the union, which by this time was affiliated to the International Association of Machinists. In 2018, he was additionally elected as special assistant to the president of the union, and then in 2020 as president of the TCU. He additionally served as a vice-president of the AFL-CIO, and as a vice-chair of the Cooperating Railway Labor Organizations.

Trade union offices
| Preceded by Bob Scardelletti | President of the Transportation Communications International Union; 2020–present | Succeeded by Incumbent |
