= Michael O'Brien (unionist) =

Michael T. O'Brien (born 1949 or 1950) is an American former labor union leader.

O'Brien worked as a school bus driver in Bristol Township, Pennsylvania from 1972, joining the Transport Workers Union of America (TWU). He held various positions in his local union before becoming its president. In 1983, he began working full-time for the international union, as an organizer, and immediately began organizing workers at what became American Eagle. He later became the union's Transit Director, a vice president in 1993, and then executive vice president in 2003. In his various posts, he negotiated many contracts, and led a strike of food service workers at Marriott International.

In 2004, O'Brien was elected as president of the TWU. Under his leadership, the union's local 100 led the 2005 New York City transit strike, which O'Brien refused to support. O'Brien was also elected as a vice-president of the AFL-CIO. He retired in 2006, due to poor health.

Trade union offices
Preceded by Sonny Hall	President of the Transport Workers Union of America; 2004–2006	Succeeded by James Little
