= Jerry Wurf =

American labor union leader (1919–1981)

Jerome Wurf
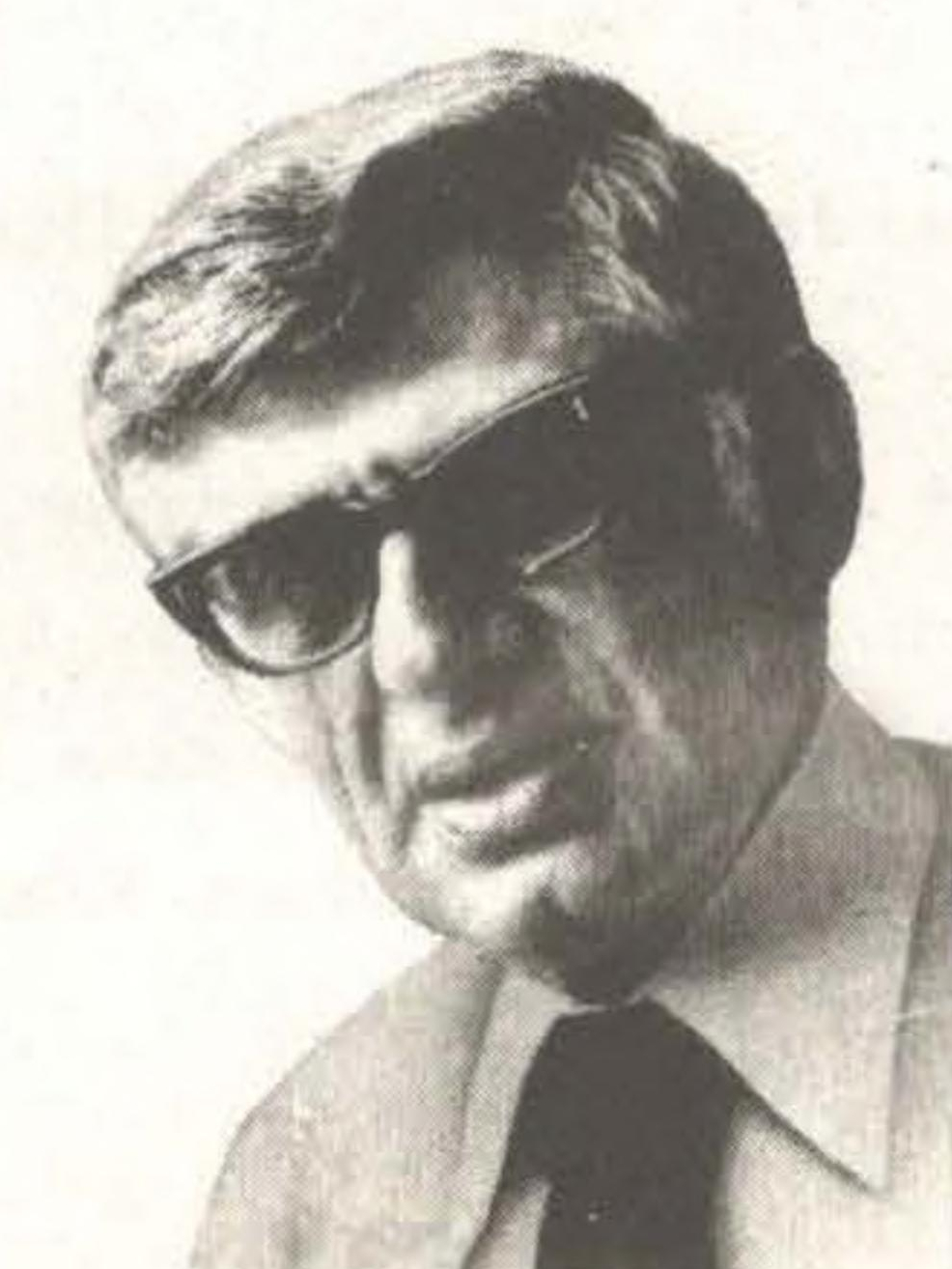
- Wurf c. 1979
- Born: May 18, 1919; New York City, New York, U.S.
- Died: December 10, 1981 (aged 62); Washington, D.C., U.S.
- Occupation: Union leader
- Spouse(s): Sylvia (Spinrad) Wurf (divorced); Mildred (Kiefer) Wurf
- Children: Two daughters, one son
- Parent(s): Sigmund and Lena (Tannenbaum) Wurf

Jerome Wurf (May 18, 1919 – December 10, 1981) was a U.S. labor leader and president of the American Federation of State, County and Municipal Employees (AFSCME) from 1964 to 1981. Wurf was a friend of Martin Luther King Jr., and was arrested multiple times for his activism, notably during the Memphis sanitation strike. He was present for King's "I've Been to the Mountaintop" oratory at the strike, the day before King was assassinated, and attended King's funeral.

== Background ==
Wurf was born in New York City in 1919. The son of Jewish immigrants (his father was a tailor and textile worker) from Austria-Hungary, he developed polio at the age of four. As a young man growing up in Brighton Beach, he was inclined towards radicalism by his family's poverty and by communists he met. For some time he was a member of the Young Communist League; he subsequently left it for the Young People's Socialist League. He was a critical of both groups, but preferred the YPSL due to his dislike of Soviet totalitarianism.

== HERE ==
He enrolled at New York University but dropped out to pursue radical organizing. He got his start in the labor movement by working cafeterias and organizing the workers, forming Local 448, Food and Cashiers Local of the Hotel Employees and Restaurant Employees Union (HERE), in 1943. Local 448 was becoming powerful when HERE leadership incorporated it into Local 325 (Cooks, Countermen, Subdispensers, Cashiers and Assistants), then fired Wurf. Wurf believed that hostile union leaders caused him to be systematically denied work in the following years.

== AFSCME District Council 37 ==
AFSCME president Arnold Zander hired Wurf to the union in 1947, after it became clear that Wurf was not welcome in HERE. At this point, AFSCME was not very powerful, and Wurf recalled being treated with contempt by other local organizers. He was generally disillusioned by his union's apparent capitulation to the anti-communism of the AFL–CIO and to the desires of local politicians.

On the brink of quitting his job in 1952, Wurf was appointed, again by Zander, to the presidency of New York's District Council 37. This upset various established local union leaders, who in many cases tried to leave AFSCME for other unions. Nevertheless, District Council 37 achieved some concrete victories for workers under Wurf's leadership.

In 1958, Wurf wrung from mayor Robert F. Wagner Jr. an executive order giving the city's workers the right to form unions, and providing for elections which could establish these unions as exclusive bargaining agents for the workers in various city agencies. (This order was a model for President Kennedy's Executive Order 10988, which recognized the right of federal employees to collective bargaining. ) District Council 37 won many of the ensuing elections, making it into one of the large public employee local unions in the world.

Wurf broke with Zander over his allegiances to the AFL–CIO and to the Mafia. He also questioned Zander's growing authority over individual Locals through trusteeships. After the union's 1958 convention, he decided to seek its presidency.

== Election campaign ==
Wurf and others unhappy with Zander's leadership formed COUR, the Committee on Union Responsibility, as an opposition party. The organization gained popularity, and received a number of votes in 1962 even though hundreds of "international" delegates were directly controlled by Zander. Zander also benefited from rules limiting any one Local's representation to five delegates (with one delegate per hundred members), rules which substantially decreased the power of larger urban Locals. Wurf himself did not campaign actively in 1962, although he did receive a nomination for president. Even so, the final vote was close (1490 to 1085). Zander, surprised by the result, subsequently lost face at the convention during unsuccessful efforts to increase union taxes on the Locals.

Over the next two years, Zander tried to expel Wurf and other members of COUR from the union. This proved difficult due to their popular support. Zander and his supporters also published negative stories about Wurf in the union's newspaper, denying COUR access to the mailing list for its distribution.

In 1964, Wurf unseated Zander by just 21 votes, despite Zander's active use of his incumbent position to control the election procedurally. According to the Milwaukee Sentinel: "Zander's supporters attempted to prevent Wurf's backers from reading results of the election into the convention records. The struggle from the floor, with Zander guiding the fight from the podium continued into the afternoon session." COUR won ten out of eleven seats on the executive board. After the announcement of his narrow victory, Wurf surrounded himself with bodyguards and sent three people to the union office in Washington to change the locks. He also moved to designate Zander 'president emeritus' and provide him with a full salary and expenses until retirement age.

Wurf became the first challenger to defeat a president of a major AFL-CIO international union since Walter Reuther had done so in 1946.

=== Arrival in Washington ===
When Wurf arrived at AFSCME offices at 815 Mount Vernon Place in Washington, they were trashed inside and outside. One floor of the building had been leased to a pizza bakery. After examining the account books, Wurf also realized that AFSCME was hundreds of thousands of dollars in debt. Wurf sold the building and moved the union to a smaller office.

Also soon after arriving, Wurf discovered and ended an ongoing CIA program within AFSCME. This program funneled around a million dollars to British Guiana between 1957 and 1964 for the purpose of supporting Forbes Burnham over Cheddi Jagan.

=== Constitutional convention ===
In 1965, Wurf called a constitutional convention for AFSCME in Washington. The convention passed amendments that increased representation from large Locals (allowing them more than five delegates, though only one for every additional thousand), decreased the central office's ability to control Locals through trusteeships, and required that union vice presidents be elected locally and not paid members of the "international" office. The convention did increase the powers of the union president, authorizing him or her to "employ, terminate, fix the compensation and expenses, and direct the activities of such office staff, administrative assistants, technical and professional assistants, field staff, organizers, and representatives as are required to carry out effectively the functions of his office."

== Presidency ==
Wurf's election in 1964 began an area of growth and racial inclusion for the union.

Through energetic organizing and aggressive bargaining, AFSCME grew rapidly under his leadership from about 220,000 members to just over one million in 1981.

Wurf presided over strikes in New York (1965), Lansing (1966), Memphis (1968), Baltimore (1974) and more.

Wurf was a frequent dissenter to the policies of the AFL-CIO and its president George Meany.

Wurf was a member of the Democratic Socialist Organizing Committee, the precursor to the Democratic Socialists of America.

== Civil rights movement ==
Wurf was extremely active in the civil rights movement. He helped establish the first New York State chapter of the Congress of Racial Equality (CORE) in the late 1940s. He was a close associate of Martin Luther King Jr., who was working in support of the Memphis sanitation strike when he was assassinated in April 1968. "Let us never forget that Martin Luther King, on a mission for us, was killed in this city. He helped bring us this victory," Wurf later said. Although Wurf did not back the strike initially, due to the violent atmosphere, he supported it after it went into effect.

== After AFSCME presidency ==
Wurf died of a heart attack at George Washington University Hospital in Washington, D.C., on December 10, 1981. Gerald McEntee succeeded him as president of AFSCME.

Wurf's legacy as AFSCME President is documented in the AFSCME Archives at the Walter P. Reuther Library in Detroit as the AFSCME Office of the President: Jerry Wurf Records, 1959–1981, as well as many other AFSCME departmental collections.

Trade union offices
Preceded by Arnold Zander	President of American Federation of State, County and Municipal Employees; 1964-1981	Succeeded by Gerald McEntee
Preceded by Paul Hall; William J. Farson	AFL-CIO delegate to the Trades Union Congress; 1967; With: William Pachler	Succeeded by William Gillen; Herman D. Kenin
