= William J. Pachler =

William J. Pachler (August 20, 1904 – May 25, 1970) was an American labor union leader.

Born in Thornwood, New York, Pachler studied accounting at a business college before joining the New York Edison Company. He joined the International Brotherhood of Electrical Workers (IBEW) in 1930, and was elected as president of his local union in 1939. Under his leadership, the following year, the local disaffiliated from IBEW and joined the new Brotherhood of Consolidated Edison Employees. In 1945, he affiliated the local to the Congress of Industrial Organizations. It became part of the new Utility Workers' Union of America later that year, and Pachler was elected as the union's first secretary-treasurer.

Pachler organized the National Conference of Secretary-Treasurers, and was its chair until 1960. That year, he was elected as president of the Utility Workers. He also served on the ethical practices committee of the AFL-CIO, and co-authored the federation's internal disputes plan. In 1963, he was a delegate to the International Labour Organization conference in Geneva, and he also represented the AFL-CIO to the British Trades Union Congress. He died in 1970, while still in office.

Trade union offices
Preceded by Union founded	Secretary-Treasurer of the Utility Workers' Union of America; 1945–1960	Succeeded by Andrew J. McMahon
Preceded by Joseph A. Fisher	President of the Utility Workers' Union of America; 1960–1970	Succeeded by John J. Earley
Preceded by Paul Hall; William J. Farson	AFL-CIO delegate to the Trades Union Congress; 1967; With: Jerry Wurf	Succeeded by William Gillen; Herman D. Kenin
