= C. L. Dennis =

American labor union leader

Charles Leslie "Les" Dennis (June 21, 1908 – July 29, 1978) was an American labor union leader.

Born in Beardstown, Illinois, Dennis began working in a biscuit factory but was sacked after he tried to organize a union. He then found work as a freight handler on the Chicago and North Western Railway, and joined the Brotherhood of Railway, Airline and Steamship Clerks, Freight Handlers, Express and Station Employees (BRAC), in which his father already held membership. In 1940, he became general chairman of the railroad's board of adjustment.

In 1957, Dennis became acting vice-president of BRAC, being elected to the post in 1959. He was then elected as president of the union in 1963. In 1968, he was additionally appointed as chair of the Committee of Transportation Trades, and in 1969 as a vice-president of the AFL-CIO, later representing the federation in various overseas missions. He was also active in the International Transport Workers' Federation.

Dennis left his role at BRAC in 1976. The Washington Post claimed that he had been forced out of the role after trying to line his son up to succeed him. He retired from his AFL-CIO post in 1977 and was appointed by Jimmy Carter to the White House Commission on Employment of the Handicapped. He died in 1978.

Trade union offices
Preceded by George McGregor Harrison	President of the Brotherhood of Railway and Airline Clerks; 1963–1976	Succeeded by Fred J. Kroll
Preceded by William Gillen; Herman D. Kenin	AFL-CIO delegate to the Trades Union Congress; 1969; With: Kenneth J. Brown	Succeeded by I. W. Abel; Teddy Gleason
