= John Samuelsen =

American labor union leader

John Samuelsen (born 1967 or 1968) is an American labor union leader who has served as president of the Transport Workers Union of America since 2017.

== Biography ==
Born in Brooklyn, Samuelsen became a track worker on the New York Subway and joined the Transport Workers Union of America (TWU) in 1993. In 2009, he was elected president of the union's Local 100, in which role he negotiated an agreement covering 38,000 workers.

Samuelsen was elected as president of the TWU in 2017, its youngest leader since Mike Quill. He was also elected as a vice-president of the AFL-CIO. During the 2024 elections, Samuelson said he wanted the Democratic Party to control the House of Representatives, but he also endorsed two swing-seat Republicans, Mike Lawler and Marc Molinaro.

Samuelsen was re-elected as president of the TWU in 2025, running unopposed. In 2025, he called New York Mayor Eric Adams, "Judas Iscariot", for calling for a phasing out of horse-drawn carriages in New York. He joined NYC Mayor-elect Zohran Mamdani's transition committee in November 2025.

As head of the TWU, he has supported legislation mandating that MTA subway trains have a two-person crew. Critics described two-person crews as costly and unnecessary, as most of the world’s major train lines have either one-person crews or have moved to full automation. In December 2025, New York Governor Kathy Hochul vetoed legislation that mandated two-person crews. Samuelsen described the veto as "classist".

Trade union offices
Preceded by Harry Lombardo	President of the Transport Workers Union of America; 2017–present	Succeeded by Present
