= James Little (unionist) =

James Little is an American former labor union leader.

Little became a fleet service clerk with American Airlines in 1971. He joined the Transport Workers Union of America (TWU), and was elected as president of his local union in 1990. In 1995, he was elected to the union's international executive board, and in 1997 he began working as a representative for the international union.

Little was elected as a vice president of the TWU in 1999, also becoming director of its air transport division in 2000. He became executive vice president in 2005, and then in 2006 won election as president of the union. As leader of the TWU, he focused on job creation, funding for transport systems, and union rights. He stood down as president in 2013.

Little was also elected as a vice-president of the AFL-CIO, retiring in 2014.

Trade union offices
Preceded by Michael O'Brien	President of the Transport Workers Union of America; 2006–2013	Succeeded by Harry Lombardo
