= Newton B. Jones =

American labor union leader

Newton B. Jones (born 1953) is an American former labor union leader.

Born in Norfolk, Virginia, Jones became a boilermaker in 1971. He joined the International Brotherhood of Boilermakers, Iron Ship Builders, Blacksmiths, Forgers and Helpers (IBB), following in the footsteps of his father, Charles W. Jones. He spent a year studying at the University of South Florida. He began working for the international union in 1981, and in 1986 became its director of organizing and communications. His next role was international vice president for the union's south east section.

In 2003, Jones replaced his father as president of the union, winning an election to the post in 2006. He also served as a vice-president of the AFL-CIO, and as chairman of the Bank of Labor.

In 2023, Jones was accused of financial malfeasance, and the union's executive removed him from office. Jones refused to recognize this removal, but instead announced his retirement, stating that Cory R. Channon would replace him. The executive instead appointed Warren Fairley, who was later confirmed in post by a federal court. Newton Jones is no longer a member of the Boilermaker union. Newton Jones is currently under indictment by the United States federal government. Jones and his cohorts were found guilty on June 5, 2026. Newton Jones is scheduled for sentencing on September 1, 2026. He faces 20 years in prison.

Trade union offices
Preceded by Charles W. Jones	President of the International Brotherhood of Boilermakers; 2003–2023	Succeeded by Warren Fairley
