= Willard Saxby Townsend =

African-American labour leader

- Born: December 4, 1895; Cincinnati, Ohio, US
- Died: February 3, 1957 (aged 61)
- Education: University of Toronto
- Known for: Union activism

Willard Saxby Townsend (December 4, 1895 – February 3, 1957) was an African-American labour leader. He worked to improve the working conditions of African-American baggage handlers in railroad terminals, and was the first African-American to serve as vice president of the Congress of Industrial Organizations. He was inducted into the National Railroad Hall of Fame.

== Early life and education ==
Townsend was born Cincinnati in the year that Booker T. Washington delivered his Atlanta Compromise speech. He was the son of William Townsend and Cora Beatrice Townsend. After completing high school he worked in the Cincinnati Union Terminal. In 1916 Townsend joined the United States Army, and served as a lieutenant in France in the army 372nd Infantry Regiment during World War I. When Townsend returned from the war he helped to form an entirely African-American company of the Ohio National Guard. Townsend started his university studies at the Illinois School of Chiropody, and briefly practised as a chiropodist. He met Alberta Hunter at one of her performances in Cincinnati, and married her in January 1919. He moved to Canada, where he worked as a waiter in a dining car to pay for his university studies. He became a secretary of the Canadian Brotherhood of Railway Employees, and realised the "divisive power of race to stop union organising". Townsend started a pre-medical program at the University of Toronto and eventually studied chemistry. He graduated in 1924, but could not find meaningful, well-paid work. When African American railroad workers requested equal pay to their white counterparts, the Canadian National Railway stopped employing them and replaced their African American employees with white ones.

== Career ==
In 1929 Townsend returned to the United States, where he worked in a high school in Texas. He moved to Chicago, where he joined the Adler Psychological Laboratory as a messenger. He began to work as a porter on the railroad. Surprised by the working conditions, Townsend joined the American Federation of Labor Auxiliary of Red Caps. Red caps are railroad station porters, and were predominantly African-American in the early 1900s. Townsend was elected president of the AFL in 1936, and formed the international United Transport Service Employees from 1940. The United Transport Service Employees (UTSE) was originally known as the International Brotherhood of Redcaps, but changed their name after inviting pullman laundry workers to join. He was supported by Leon M. Despres.

Townsend became politically active, and lobbied the United States Congress for improvement in worker conditions. This success arrived in 1940, when it was decided by the Supreme Court of the United States that red caps would be paid ten cents for each parcel or piece of luggage carried to and from trains. He ensured that members of his union had their salaries protected under the Fair Labor Standards Act of 1938. Townsend led an appeal to the Interstate Commerce Commission under the Railway Labor Act.

In 1942 the UTSE became affiliated with the Congress of Industrial Organizations, and Townsend became the first African-American to hold office in a national union. Following the success of Townsend's unions, the Brotherhood of Railway Clerks of the American Federation of Labor, opened their membership to red caps. The journalist George McCray wrote that Townsend was "fast becoming the most powerful negro leader in the country". Following the 1943 Detroit race riot, Townsend declared "America is sick". He charged that democracy would only survive in America "if its advocates fight just as hard for the positive values of equality, labor and justice as its enemies fight for the negative values of racism, terror and exploitation". He criticised the Federal Housing Administration for the segregated housing they developed during and after World War II.

Townsend did not only campaign for equality for African Americans, but defended Japanese and Japanese Americans too. He claimed that Japanese Americans were "giving more and receiving less than many lip-service Americans". Townsend was selected for a World Federation of Trade Unions (WFTU) committee that studied working conditions in Japan, China, Korea and the Philippines. He represented the United States at a WFTU meeting in Tokyo in 1947. He called for Japanese labourers to not become involved with political battles, and suggested that they visited the United States to study their trade union methods. That year he also attended the American Missionary Association's Institute of Race Relations, where he criticised the influence of communism on the trade union movement. He served as an adviser for the International Labor Office meeting in Mexico, where he worked to eliminate race discrimination. He was involved with the National Association for the Advancement of Colored People as well as the National Urban League.

Townsend studied law at the Blackstone Law School in Chicago and earned his second degree in 1951. He was elected vice president of the recently merged American Federation of Labor and Congress of Industrial Organizations in 1955. Townsend died of a heart attack in 1957. He was inducted into the National Railroad Hall of Fame.

== Electoral history ==
Illinois's 1st congressional district Democratic primary, 1940
Party	Candidate	Votes	%
Democratic	Arthur W. Mitchell (incumbent)	17,767	84.10
Democratic	Willard S. Townsend	3,358	15.90
Total votes		21,125	100.0
