= Utility Workers Union of America =

Labor union

UWUA
- Utility Workers Union of America
- Founded: 1940
- Headquarters: Washington, DC
- Location: United States
- Members: 50,000 (2014)
- Key people: James Slevin, president
- Affiliations: AFL–CIO
- Website: uwua.net

The Utility Workers Union of America (UWUA) is a labor union in the United States. It has a membership of 50,000 and is affiliated with the AFL–CIO. The union has over 50,000 members working in the electric, gas, steam, water, and nuclear industries across the United States. The UWUA represents utility workers in municipal, as well as publicly traded utilities. Fields include power generation (power plants), power distribution (transmission and distribution), call/service center employees, as well as natural gas and water utilities.

== Presidents ==
1945: Joseph A. Fisher
1960: William J. Pachler
1970: John J. Earley
1970s: Hugh J. Foley
1970s: Valentine P. Murphy
1980s: James Joy
1991: Marshall M. Hicks
1996: Donald Wightman
2006: Michael Langford
2019: James Slevin
