= International Brotherhood of Blacksmiths, Drop Forgers and Helpers =

The International Brotherhood of Blacksmiths, Drop Forgers and Helpers (IBB&H) was a labor union representing metal workers in the United States and Canada.

The union was founded in 1889, as the International Brotherhood of Blacksmiths, initially representing blacksmiths working in the railroad industry. It was severely affected by the American Railway Union strike of 1894 and nearly collapsed. It was chartered by the American Federation of Labor (AFL) on October 30, 1897. In 1903, it absorbed some AFL-affiliated local unions representing blacksmiths and helpers outside the railroad industry, and renamed itself as the International Brotherhood of Blacksmiths and Helpers. In 1919, the union absorbed the Brotherhood of Drop Forgers, Die Sinkers, and Trimming Die Makers, and adopted its final name.

By 1925, the union had 15,000 members, but would only admit white workers as blacksmiths, black workers being restricted to helper roles. Membership grew to 25,000 in 1950. On May 16, 1951, it merged into what is now the International Brotherhood of Boilermakers, Iron Ship Builders, Blacksmiths, Forgers and Helpers.

== Presidents ==
1889: James Edwards
1891: James H. Cater
1893: John Slocum
1905: James W. Kline
1926: Roy Horn
1944: John Pelkofer
