= International Brotherhood of Boilermakers, Iron Ship Builders, Blacksmiths, Forgers and Helpers =

North American trade union

- Abbreviation: IBB
- Formation: 1893
- Merger of: International Brotherhood of Boiler Makers and Iron Ship Builders; National Brotherhood of Boiler Makers
- Type: Trade union
- Headquarters: Kansas City, Missouri, US
- Locations: Canada; United States
- Members: 49,491 (2018)
- Subsidiaries: IBB Campaign Assistance Fund; IBB Legislative Education Fund; IBB Archives; International Brotherhood Cajun Realty Corporation; International Brotherhood Building Corporation; International Brotherhood Real Estate Holding Company
- Affiliations: AFL-CIO (North America's Building Trades Unions); Canadian Labour Congress
- Revenue: $41,167,054 (2014)
- Expenses: $40,578,455 (2014)
- Employees: 101 (2013)
- Website: boilermakers.org
- Formerly called: Brotherhood of Boiler Makers and Iron Ship Builders of America; International Brotherhood of Boilermakers, Iron Ship Builders and Helpers of America

The International Brotherhood of Boilermakers, Iron Ship Builders, Blacksmiths, Forgers and Helpers (IBB), sometimes referred to as the International Brotherhood of Boilermakers, is a trade union in the United States and Canada. It is for boilermakers and related occupations, and is affiliated with the AFL–CIO.

The Boilermakers union has a four-year apprenticeship training program before becoming a journeyman. Boilermakers primarily work in nuclear and fossil power plants. However they also work in shipyards, refineries, chemical plants, manufacturing, and the rail and cement industries. The work involves welding, rigging and fabricating.

== History ==
=== Formation ===
The International Brotherhood of Boilermakers, Iron Ship Builders, Blacksmiths, Forgers and Helpers was founded on September 1, 1893. On that day, at a meeting in Chicago, Illinois, representatives from the International Brotherhood of Boiler Makers and Iron Ship Builders, which had been organized on October 1, 1880, and the National Brotherhood of Boiler Makers, which had been formed in Atlanta, Georgia, in May 1888, resolved to consolidate their organizations. It was further agreed that the new organization, to be known as the Brotherhood of Boiler Makers and Iron Ship Builders of America, would make its headquarters in Kansas City, Kansas. In July 2023, the union's headquarters moved to Kansas City, Missouri.

=== Affiliation with AFL ===
Two and a half years later, on the ninth of June 1896, the Brotherhood affiliated with the American Federation of Labor.

=== Helpers Division ===
In subsequent years, the Brotherhood continued to grow, and in 1902, the Helpers division was formed. Because helpers were barred from sitting in the lodge room with mechanics, this new division had its own local unions and was entirely separate from the Boiler Makers. This would change a decade later when the Helpers Division would be consolidated with the Mechanics Division.

=== Name change ===
In March 1906, at a special Convention in Kansas City, the name of the Union was changed to the International Brotherhood of Boilermakers, Iron Ship Builders and Helpers of America in order to incorporate the newest division. Also at this time, the term "Boiler Makers" was condensed into one word, "Boilermakers."

=== Affiliation with AFL–CIO ===
The Boilermakers affiliated with the Building Trades Department of the American Federation of Labor in February 1931. At the turn of the century, total membership stood at about 8,500, but by 1944, due in part to dramatic increases in the shipbuilding, railroad, and fabrication shop industries during World War II, the Boilermakers numbered over 350,000.

=== First merger ===
In 1954, the Boilermakers merged their organization with the International Brotherhood of Blacksmiths, Drop Forgers and Helpers. The International Brotherhood of Blacksmiths had been organized in 1889 and added Helpers to both their membership and their name in 1901.

=== Second merger and name change ===
A 1919 merger with the Brotherhood of Drop Forgers created the union that, on June 29, 1953, merged with the Boilermakers to create the International Brotherhood of Boilermakers, Iron Ship Builders, Blacksmiths, Forgers and Helpers. A year later, a new International seal was adopted to include all crafts.

=== Health and Welfare Fund ===
On October 1, 1954, the Boilermaker National Health and Welfare Fund was established, on November 9, 1959, the Boilermakers National Joint Apprenticeship Fund began, and the Boilermaker-Blacksmith National Pension Trust became effective October 1, 1960.

=== Construction Division ===
Delegates to the 1977 convention held at Vancouver, Canada voted to establish a Construction Division at International Headquarters for the purpose of servicing those members with employment in, or related to, the construction industry.

=== Third merger ===
On March 15, 1984, the delegates to the Special Merger Convention of the United Cement, Lime, Gypsum and Allied Workers International Union voted to merge with the International Brotherhood of Boilermakers, Iron Ship Builders, Blacksmiths, Forgers and Helpers. The merger of the CLGAW, formed in 1936, and its 10,000 members who dominate the building products and supplies industry, and the Boilermakers forged an organization with a greater ability to provide services to its members.

=== Fourth merger ===
On October 1, 1994, a merger was consummated with the Stove, Furnace and Allied Appliance Workers' International Union—a skilled trade union that was organized in 1891. The Stove Workers, with 5,800 members, became a division of the International Brotherhood known as the Stove, Furnace, Energy and Allied Appliance Workers Division. The word energy was inserted to give special recognition to coal miners within that division. The division had its members employed primarily in the manufacturing of stoves and various types of appliances.

=== Fifth merger ===
During the same period, merger talks were also being carried out with an independent union known as the Western Energy Workers. This one-local union, formed in 1978 with members employed in the coal strip-mining, signed a merger agreement with the Boilermakers effective December 1, 1994.

=== Sixth merger ===
In October 1996, a merger agreement was made with the Metal Polishers', Buffers', Platers' and Allied Workers' International Union. This union was also an old line, skilled trade union that was organized in 1892. This merger brought 4,000 new members to the Brotherhood. These members are employed primarily in plating and polishing shops within the United States and Canada.

=== International president ===
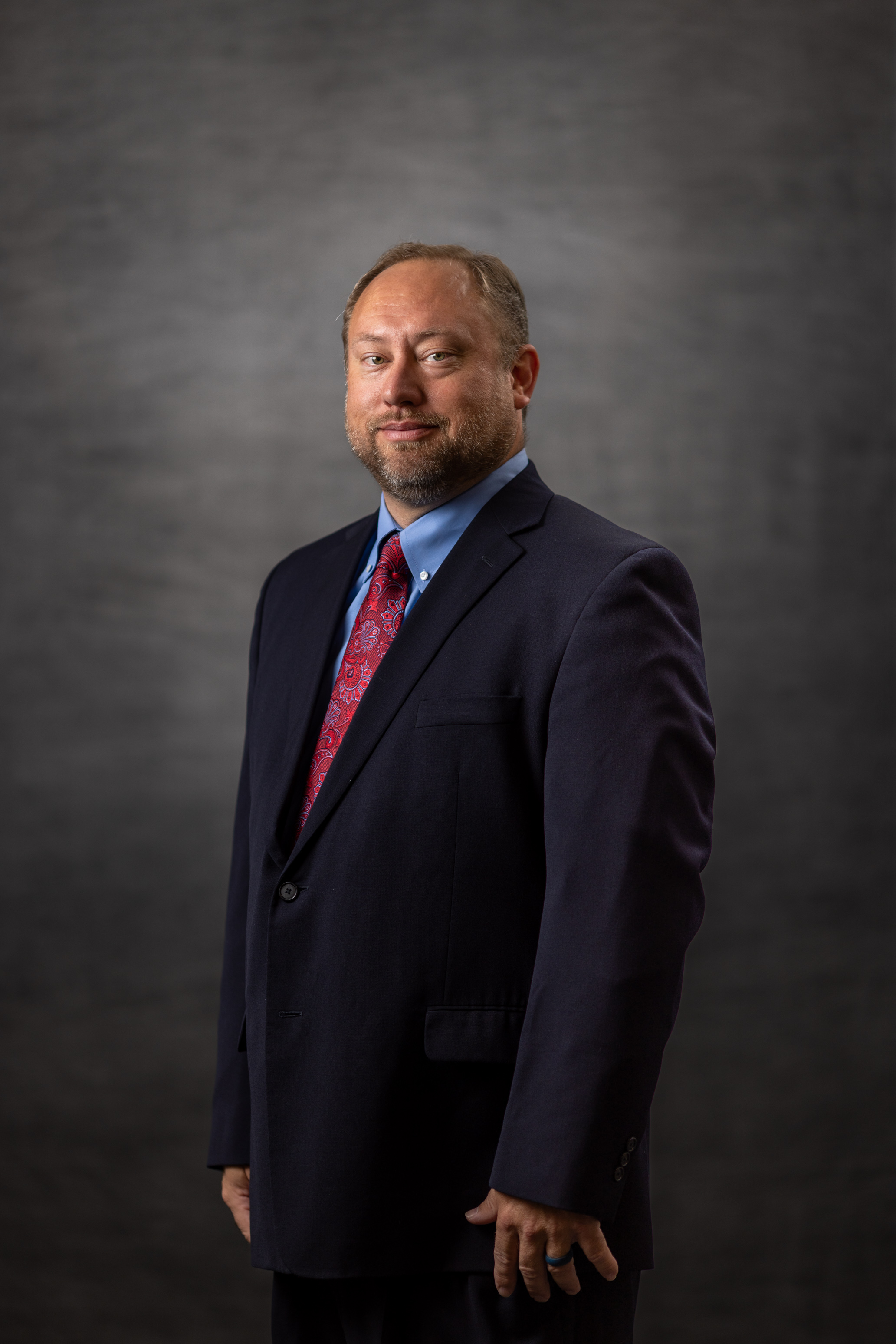
Timothy Simmons is the International President of the International Brotherhood of Boilermakers.

Timothy Simmons is the International President of the International Brotherhood of Boilermakers. The International Executive Council elected him to the position upon the retirement of International President Warren Fairley on August 20, 2024. Simmons began his Boilermaker career on a boiler outage in 1999, working out of Boilermakers Local 108 in Birmingham, Alabama, at the Alabama Power Miller Steam Plant. He has served in a variety of leadership roles including as a Local 108 Business Agent/Secretary Treasurer, District Lodge #3 Officer, Director of National Recruitment Services, Director of Construction Division Services and Assistant to the International President.

In October 2022, the International Executive Council voted unanimously to elect Simmons to fill the IVP-Southeast Section vacancy, effective February 1, 2023, upon the retirement of Warren Fairley. (Fairley briefly came out of retirement to serve the union as International President during a time of transition after Newton Jones was removed from the role.)

== Removal of president ==
Former International President Newton B. Jones was removed from office June of 2023 for multiple issues including misuse of funds. After internal disciplinary charges were filed against Jones alleging serious misuse of funds, an internal hearing in accordance with the union's Constitution was held, resulting in a decision to remove Jones from membership and his role as president, in addition to other actions. Jones attempted to stop the process in federal court in Kansas City, Kansas, and three hearings were held on the matter. On August 15, 2023, Judge Eric F. Melgren issued his summary judgement decision from the bench in favor of the International Vice Presidents who had sought to uphold the decision relating to the internal charges against Jones. Judge Melgren found that the original internal action was proper and conducted in accordance with the union's Constitution.

== Leadership ==
=== Presidents ===
1893: Lee Johnson
1897: John McNeil
1905: George F. Dunn
1908: Joseph A. Franklin
1944: Charles J. MacGowan
1954: William A. Calvin
1962: Russell K. Berg
1970: Harold J. Buoy
1983: Charles W. Jones
2003: Newton B. Jones
2023: Warren Fairley
2024: Timothy Simmons

=== Secretary-Treasurers ===
1893: William J. Gilthorpe
1914: Frank Reinmeyer
1920: Joseph Flynn
1926: Charles F. Scott
1936: William E. Walter
1945: William J. Buckley
1958: Homer E. Patton
1973: Charles F. Moran
1986: Don Whan
1989: Jerry Willburn
2005: William T. Creeden
2023: Kathy Stapp
2024: Clint Penny
