= Insurance Agents' International Union =

The Insurance Agents' International Union (IAIU) was a labor union representing agents in the insurance industry, in the United States and Canada.

The union originated in 1938 as the National Federation of Insurance Agents Council of the American Federation of Labor (AFL). It was chartered by the AFL, as the IAIU, on May 15, 1951. It affiliated to the new AFL-CIO in 1955, and by 1957, it had 11,000 members. On May 18, 1959, it merged with the Insurance Workers of America, to form the Insurance Workers' International Union.

Throughout its history, the union was led by president George L. Russ.
