= Bob Scardelletti =

Robert Attillio Scardelletti (born 1948 or 1949) is a retired American labor union leader.

Based in Cleveland, Ohio, Scardelletti became a railroad yard clerk with the New York Central Railroad in 1967. He joined the Transportation Communications International Union (TCU), and was elected as chair of his local in 1971, and then divisional chair in 1973. In 1975, he began working full-time at the union's headquarters, and steadily rose through the ranks until he was elected as president in 1991.

As leader of the union, Scardelletti negotiated the 2001 Railroad Retirement and Survivors Improvement Act. In 2005, he merged the TCU into the International Association of Machinists. The TCU became an autonomous section of the Machinists, with Scardelletti remaining president until his retirement in 2020.

Trade union offices
Preceded by Richard I. Kilroy	President of the Transportation Communications International Union; 1991–2020	Succeeded by Arthur Maratea
