= Brotherhood of Railroad Signalmen =

Labor union in the United States

- Abbreviation: BRS
- Founded: 1901
- Headquarters: Front Royal, Virginia, United States
- Location: United States, Canada
- Members: 10,500
- Affiliations: AFL–CIO, CLC
- Website: www.brs.org

The Brotherhood of Railroad Signalmen (BRS) is a United States labor union representing workers responsible for the installation, maintenance, and repair of railroad signaling and traffic control systems. These systems include wayside signals, interlockings, and highway-rail grade crossing warning devices that are critical to the safe and efficient operation of rail transportation networks.

Founded in 1901, the BRS represents approximately 10,500 members employed across freight and passenger railroads, as well as companies that manufacture and construct signal equipment. The union is affiliated with the AFL–CIO and its Transportation Trades Department, and is headquartered in Front Royal, Virginia.

As of 2026, Michael S. Baldwin serves as president and Brandon E. Elvey as secretary-treasurer. The union maintains a national structure of vice presidents representing various regions and functions.

== Presidents ==
1901: H. G. Detwiler
1908: Philip Weller
1908: John Bindscheattel
1909: M. J. Hooper
1910: J. A. Martin
1913: Wilmot J. Pettit
1915: A. E. Adams
1917: Daniel Helt
1934: Anon Lyon
1945: Jesse Clark
1969: Charles J. Chamberlain
1977: Tom Bates
1987: Butch Speakman
1992: Dan Pickett
2018: Floyd Mason
2019: Jerry C. Boles
2021: Michael S. Baldwin

== See also ==
- Institution of Railway Signal Engineers
- United Pointsmen and Signalmen's Society
