= Transportation Communications International Union =

Organization in the United States

TCU
- Transportation Communications Union
- Merged into: International Association of Machinists
- Founded: December 29, 1899
- Headquarters: Rockville, Maryland, United States
- Location: United States
- Members: 36,000
- Key people: Arthur Maratea, National President
- Affiliations: IAM, AFL–CIO
- Website: http://www.tcunion.org
- Voted to merge with IAM in July 2005; merger completed by 2012

The Transportation Communications Union (TCU) is the successor to the union formerly known as the Brotherhood of Railway Clerks and includes within it many other organizations, including the Brotherhood of Railway Carmen of America and the Brotherhood of Sleeping Car Porters, that have merged with it since 1969.

== Change of name ==
The union was founded in 1899 by 33 railroad clerks meeting in Sedalia, Missouri, who formed an organization named the "Order of Railroad Clerks of America". The organization renamed itself the "Brotherhood of Railway Clerks", in line with other railway "brotherhoods" of the time. With that name, it took part in the Illinois Central shopmen's strike of 1911.

In 1919, it renamed itself the "Brotherhood of Railway and Steamship Clerks, Freight Handlers, Express and Station Employes" to reflect its broadened jurisdiction. From 1928 to 1963, George McGregor Harrison served as its Grand President. In 1967, it changed names again to the "Brotherhood of Railway, Airline, Steamship Clerks, Freight Handlers, Express and Station Employes", commonly known as BRAC. Finally, in 1987, after absorbing members from a half dozen other unions that merged with BRAC, the organization adopted its current name.

== Merger partners ==
The Order of Railroad Telegraphers was founded in June 1886 at Cedar Rapids, Iowa. In 1965, the ORT changed its name to the Transportation Communications Employees Union. It merged with BRAC in 1969.

The Railway Patrolmen's International Union represented rail police officers on a number of railroads. RPIU merged with BRAC in 1969 and is now incorporated in its Allied Services Division.

The United Transport Services Employees union was founded in 1937 as the International Brotherhood of Red Caps, representing baggage handlers at railroad stations. A largely African-American union, it was founded with the support of the Brotherhood of Sleeping Car Porters. It changed its name to UTSE in 1940 and joined the Congress of Industrial Organizations in 1942. The Red Cap and Sky Cap members of UTSE merged with BRAC in 1972 and are also part of its Allied Services Division.

The Brotherhood of Sleeping Car Porters became a part of BRAC in 1978. Founded in 1925 by A. Philip Randolph, the Porters organized for twelve years—largely in secret and in the hostile racial climate of those years—before winning a collective bargaining agreement with the anti-union Pullman Company. BSCP members, including Edgar Nixon, played a significant role in the Civil Rights Movement in the decades that followed. When the Porters merged with BRAC, they formed the Sleeping Car Porters System Division. Today, these and other on-board Amtrak workers are represented by System Division 250.

The American Railway Supervisors Association, later renamed the American Railway and Airway Supervisors Association, was founded on November 14, 1934, by a group of supervisors on the Chicago and North Western Railway. ARASA merged with BRAC in 1980 and continues as a separate Supervisors' Division, operating under its own by-laws, within TCU.

The Western Railway Supervisors Association was founded by a group of Southern Pacific yardmasters who originally organized in 1938, then after joining and splitting from several other yardmasters unions, merged with BRAC in 1983. Its members now constitute System Board 555 and, like other groups within the union, operate under their own by-laws.

== History of the Brotherhood of Railway Carmen ==
The Brotherhood of Railway Carmen was founded on September 9, 1890, in Topeka, Kansas, by railroad employees engaged in the repair and inspection of railroad cars. In the years before merging with TCU, the brotherhood remained active in the realm of organized rail labor. Their main achievement during this era was the amendment of the Railway Retirement Act of 1937, which was signed by President Roosevelt and established a railroad retirement system, separate from the social security program. This act provided an increase in wage of $0.05 an hour, and restored pay rates on Canadian railroads, among other favorable changes.

The union has merged with other railway unions several times. The Brotherhood of Railway Carmen is a division of the Transportation Communications Union. In 1986, the Brotherhood of Railway Carmen voted to merge with the TCU, and members of this craft in the present day are considered a part of the TCU's Carmen Division, which operates by its own by-laws. The most recent merger occurred on January 1, 2012, in which the TCU merged with the International Association of Machinists, after a TCU member vote in July 2005.

The official site of the TCU claims that it all began when seven carmen met at a standing coach at a shop track in Cedar Rapids, Iowa on October 27, 1888, to form the first lodge in the brotherhood. The carmen had grown weary of working seven days a week, 12 hours per day, for $0.10 per hour with no benefits and no representation. The early name of the organization was called the Brotherhood of Railway Car Repairers of North America. The First Annual Convention of the Brotherhood was held in Topeka, Kansas on September 9, 1890. This is where the delegates first drafted its first declaration of principles of the brotherhood and declared that the intent and purpose of the union was to promote friendship, unity, and true brotherly love among its members. At this same convention, the delegates elected William H. Ronemus as Grand Chief Carman (General President), W.S. Missemer as Vice Grand Chief Carman, as well as the first Grand Executive Board.

The Brotherhood of Railway Carmen's objects in the 1930s included "to advance the moral, material, and industrial well-being of its members" and "to secure for our members a just remuneration in exchange for their labor... to shorten the hours of labor as economic development and progress will warrant, eight hours per day is the workday desired, and 44 hours per week, in order that our members may have more opportunities for intellectual development, social enjoyment, and industrial education." In 2013, the Brotherhood Division continues to advocate for similar changes. In the By-Laws of the Division, section six of the preamble states,"... [we unite] to shorten the hours of labor as economic developments and progress will warrant. Six (6) hours per day is the work day desired, and five (5) days per week, thirty (30) days annual vacation, in order that our members may have more opportunities for intellectual development, social enjoyment and industrial education."

Brotherhood groups in the United States have been prominent and widespread throughout the history of labor organizations. Other important societies include the Brotherhood of Locomotive Firemen, the Brotherhood of Railroad Trainmen, the Brotherhood of Railroad Trackmen, the Switchmen's Union of North America, and the Order of Railroad Telegraphers. These brotherhoods have similar objects which are partly social and educational. Their chief aim is the improvement of the industrial status of their members and the promotion of their economic interests as employees. They arrange wage schedules, and make arrangements about overtime, and they secure both life and disability insurance.

== TCU today ==
Arthur Maratea currently serves as National President of the Transportation Communications Union (TCU/IAM). Maratea began his career as a carman on Long Island Railroad in 1989, and later worked several railroad jobs as a telegrapher and block operator. Maratea formerly served as National Vice President & Special Assistant to the President.

Maratea succeeded Robert A. Scardelletti after his retirement on July 31, 2020. Scardelletti retired after serving a historic 29 years as President. TCU's headquarters are in Rockville, Maryland.

== Presidents ==
1899: J. F. Riley
1901: R. E. Fisher
1902: Hugh Fayman
1903: James V. Fisler
1905: Wilbur Braggins
1910: John J. Carrigan
1915: James J. Forrester
1920: Edward L. Fitzgerald
1928: George McGregor Harrison
1963: C. L. Dennis
1976: Fred J. Kroll
1981: Richard I. Kilroy
1991: Robert A. Scardelletti
2020: Arthur Maratea

== Archives ==
- Brotherhood of Railway and Steamship Clerks, Freight Handlers, Express, and Station Employees Northern Pacific System Board of Adjustment Tacoma Division records, c. 1940–1970. 6 cubic feet. At the Labor Archives of Washington State, University of Washington Libraries Special Collections.

== See also ==
- Jack Otero, former vice-president
