= Leo Gerard =

Canadian trade union leader (1947–2025)

Leo Gerard CC
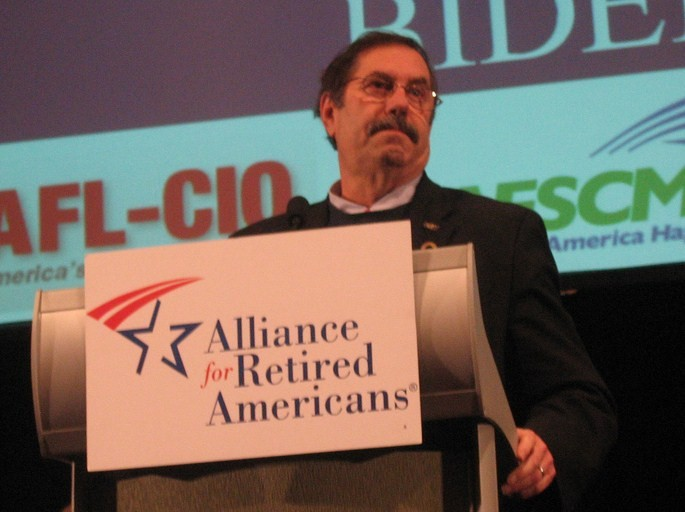
- Gerard speaking at an AFSCME rally for Obama in 2008

7th President of the United Steelworkers
- In office 2001–2019
- Preceded by: George Becker
- Succeeded by: Tom Conway

Personal details
- Born: Leo Wilfred Joseph John Gerard; March 19, 1947 Creighton Mine, Ontario, Canada
- Died: September 21, 2025 (aged 78) Sudbury, Ontario, Canada
- Spouse: Susan Gerard (m. 1969)
- Children: Kari-Ann, Meaghan
- Occupation: Labor leader, Steelworker

Leo Wilfred Joseph John Gerard CC (March 19, 1947 – September 21, 2025) was a Canadian steelworker and labour leader in both Canada and the United States. He was the longest-serving union president in the history of the United Steelworkers (USW), serving from 2001 until his retirement in 2019, and was the second Canadian to head the union. He also served on the Executive Council of the AFL-CIO.

== Early life and career ==
Gerard was born in Creighton Mine, Ontario, on March 19, 1947, at the time an unincorporated suburb of Sudbury and a company town established by Inco. His father, Wilfred Gerard, was a miner at the Creighton Mine and a key organizer with the International Mine Mill and Smelter Workers' Union (which merged with the United Steelworkers in 1967). He grew up in Sudbury. Taught that unions were supposed to be engaged on social issues and not just collective bargaining, Gerard often listened in on union meetings conducted in the family home. He handed out leaflets on the eve of a strike at the age of 11, and accompanied his father on a union organizing drive at the age of 13.

After graduating from Lively District Secondary School, 18-year old Gerard took a job at the Inco nickel smelter in Sudbury, unclogging tuyeres with a sledgehammer. He was elected steward and then chief steward of the 7,000-member Local 6500. He enrolled at Laurentian University part-time, studying economics at night and planning to be an economics professor. He quit college in 1977 when he was just a few credits short of graduation, and took a job as a staff representative for the international union.

He married his high school sweetheart, Susan, and they have two daughters.

Gerard rose steadily within the Steelworkers union hierarchy over the next two decades. After serving as chief steward for Local 6500, he was hired for a staff job with the union in 1977. He was elected director of USW District 6 in 1985 and re-elected in 1989, and was appointed national director of the Canadian division of the USW in August 1991. He was elected secretary-treasurer of the international union in 1993, and again in 1997. While USW secretary-treasurer, Gerard instituted a number of important administrative initiatives. He implemented cost-saving and revenue-generating initiatives, reorganized the secretary-treasurer's office, created an information technology department, developed a new union-to-member communications network, restructured member and local union servicing, and reinvigorated the union's organizing efforts.

Gerard eventually returned to Laurentian University and received a bachelor's degree in economics and politics. Guelph University awarded him an honorary Doctor of Laws degree in 1994.

== USW presidency ==
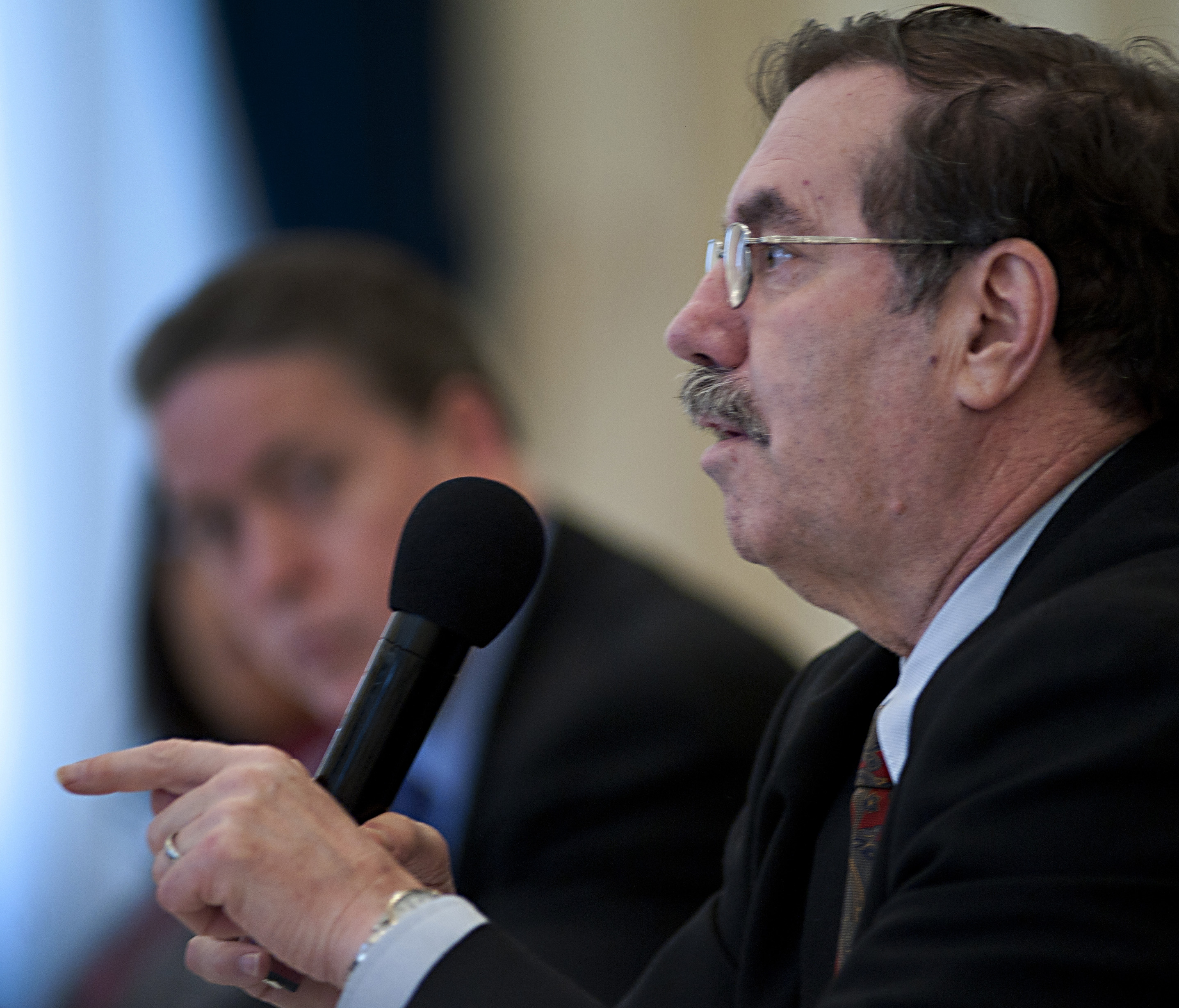
Leo Gerard discusses jobs with Agriculture Secretary Tom Vilsack at Point Park University, Pittsburgh, PA, Sept. 16, 2011

Concerned that his age hindered the USW's ability to deal effectively with the problems confronting workers, President George Becker resigned effective February 28, 2001, seven months before his term of office was to end. The Steelworkers' executive council appointed Gerard his successor on February 21.

Gerard quickly assembled a slate of supporters (many of them incumbent officers in the international union), and announced he would run for the presidency in the union's regularly scheduled elections in November 2001. He was elected without opposition to four-year terms in 2001, 2005 and 2009. Gerard was the second Canadian to head the United Steelworkers, after Lynn R. Williams (1983–1994).

=== Tenure ===
In his first two terms in office, Gerard oversaw a significant number of union mergers with the USW. The USW merged with the 12,000-member American Flint Glass Workers' Union in 2003, the 50,000-member Industrial, Wood and Allied Workers of Canada in 2004, 3,000 former members of the Brotherhood of Maintenance of Way Employees in Canada in 2004, and the 1,150-member Independent Steelworkers Union in 2007. But the most important merger was in 2005 with the 250,000-member Paper, Allied-Industrial, Chemical and Energy Workers International Union (PACE), a merger which made the USW the largest industrial union in North America.

Gerard adopted a global perspective on unionization. In 2003, he signed strategical alliances pledging mutual support on workers' rights, organizing, and collective bargaining with the World Aluminum Conference of the International Metalworkers' Federation, Australian Workers' Union, Construction, Forestry, Mining and Energy Union of Australia, Alliance of Canadian Cinema, Television and Radio Artists, National Union of Mine and Metal Workers of the Mexican Republic, Confederação Nacional dos Metalúrgicos of Brazil, and the Canadian Region of the Communications Workers of America.

In 2005, Gerard negotiated a strategic alliance with the million-member Amicus, the United Kingdom's second-largest trade union and the largest private sector union. Two years later, this strategic alliance led to a merger between the USW and Amicus' successor, the 1.8 million-member Unite. The two unions adopted a new name, Workers Uniting, although both unions will retain their individual identities for at least a few years.

He returned to Sudbury for a visit in 2008 after an arson incident burned down the historic Sudbury Steelworkers Hall, where he had gotten his start as an organizer with Local 6500, and told the city's media that seeing the burned building was one of the most traumatic events of his life. Steel's head office subsequently donated $10,000 to the city's police force as a reward for any information that led to an arrest.

Among his strategic alliances is the controversial friendship and support to the Mexican senator Napoleón Gómez Urrutia a disgraced union leader accused of having embezzled US$55 million that was supposed to be used to pay workers' severance payments at the Mexicana de Cananea mining company and that ended up being diverted by Gómez Urrutia, who later fled to Canada to avoid arrest. In April 2021, Gómez Urrutia was sentenced to return the US$55 million. He was free from jail thanks to the immunity he benefited from as a senator.

== Post-USW presidency ==
Gerard retired in 2019, and was replaced by Thomas M. Conway as International President. In 2023, he was named a Companion of the Order of Canada.

== Other roles ==
In 2002, he chaired the Second World Rubber Industries Conference in São Paulo, Brazil and served as chair of the Rubber Sector of the International Federation of Chemical, Energy, Mine and General Workers' Unions (ICEM). A member of the executive committee of the International Metalworkers' Federation, he co-chaired the federation's World Aluminum Conference in 2003.

Gerard was a member of the Labor Advisory Committee to the United States Trade Representative and the Secretary of Labor and the National Commission on Energy Policy. He was also a member of the Advisory Committee on Trade Policy and Negotiations (ACTPN).

Gerard was elected a vice president of the AFL-CIO in 2001, elected to the AFL-CIO Executive Council in 2001, and appointed to serve on the labour federation's Executive Committee in February 2003. He was instrumental in the formation of the AFL-CIO Industrial Union Council, and was named chair of the AFL-CIO's Public Policy Committee in March 2005.

He was also a member of the Apollo Alliance, a group which works toward North American energy independence and cleaner and more efficient energy alternatives, and was co-chair of the board of directors of the Blue Green Alliance.

== Personal life and death ==
Gerard suffered a blood clot (thrombus) in his heart in February 2008, and successfully underwent heart surgery to remove the blockage. Gerard died in Sudbury, Ontario, on September 21, 2025, at the age of 78. Jamie West, the MPP for Sudbury, honored Gerard, stating "I've been to three continents as a United Steelworker, and each time I was reminded that everywhere else, he’s President Gerard... But, in Sudbury, we call him 'Leo'."

== In popular culture ==
News footage of Gerard is included in the 2008 documentary, Battle in Seattle by Stuart Townsend. Gerard and USW vice president Tom Conway are seen dragging two large concrete planters into an intersection near the Washington State Convention and Trade Center during the 1999 WTO protests in an attempt to help protesters block access to the WTO meetings. Gerard and Conway came under fire by Seattle police during the incident.

Trade union offices
Preceded by George Becker	President of the United Steelworkers; 2001–2019	Succeeded by Tom Conway
