= George Becker (labor leader) =

American labor leader (1928–2007)

6th President of the United Steelworkers
- In office March 1, 1994 – February 28, 2001
- Preceded by: Lynn R. Williams
- Succeeded by: Leo Gerard

Personal details
- Born: October 20, 1928 Madison, Illinois
- Died: February 3, 2007 (aged 78) Gibsonia, Pennsylvania
- Spouse: Jane Goforth Becker
- Children: 3 sons
- Occupation: Labor leader Steelworker

George Becker (October 20, 1928 – February 3, 2007) was a steelworker, American labor leader and president of the United Steelworkers (USW) from 1993 to 2001. During his tenure as president of the Steelworkers, Becker also served as a vice president of the AFL-CIO.

== Early life ==
Becker was born in 1928 in Madison, Illinois, to George and Frances Becker. He was raised in Granite City, Illinois, where the Becker family lived within 100 feet of the gates of the Granite City Steel Works mill. The heat from the mill could be felt through the front door of the family home.

Becker dropped out of high school during his freshman year in 1944 and got a job working an open hearth furnace in the Granite City mill. In 1946, he joined the United States Marine Corps, and served two years. He returned to the steel mill, but then was drafted into the United States Army in 1950 to serve in the Korean War. He remained in the Army until 1956, mustering out as a master sergeant.

Shortly after joining the Army, Becker married Jane Goforth in 1950. The couple had three sons.

== Union career ==
Becker returned to Illinois after leaving the military. He took a job at the Dow Chemical Company aluminum plant in Madison. He joined Local 4804 of the Steelworkers. He quickly rose within the ranks, as members elected him to be the local union's shop steward, treasurer, vice president, and then (in 1961) president. Mentored by international union staff, Becker became an accomplished negotiator.

Becker was hired by the United Steelworkers in 1965 as a full-time staff representative for the Granite City local. Angered by lead poisoning afflicting workers at a National Lead Co. plant where he provided contract servicing, Becker became an expert on occupational health and safety issues. He pushed for stronger health and safety collective bargaining language, and advocated for a stronger union emphasis on the issues. In 1975, the USW hired Becker as a staff safety and health representative in the national union office in Pittsburgh, Pennsylvania. In 1969, Becker testified before the United States Congress on lead poisoning issues as Congress debated the enactment of the Occupational Safety and Health Act.

In the 1970s, Becker became active in international union politics. Taking a leave of absence from the union, in 1977 he supported the campaign of District 34 president Lloyd McBride against Edward Sadlowski for president of the United Steelworkers. McBride appointed Becker to be an administrative assistant to former District 6 president Lynn Williams, who had been elected secretary of the international union along with McBride.

When McBride died unexpectedly in 1983, Williams was elected president to serve out his term. When Williams ran for president in his own right in 1985, Becker ran for international vice president for administration on the Williams slate and won. He was re-elected in 1989.

While vice president for administration, Becker chaired the union's Aluminum Industry Conference and oversaw collective bargaining efforts by the union in the aluminum industry. He also chaired the union's Task Force on Organizing and its Task Force on the Environment.

=== Ravenswood battle ===
During Becker's tenure as vice president for administration, he led the union's fight for a contract at Ravenswood Aluminum in Ravenswood, West Virginia.

In November 1990, Ravenswood Aluminum locked out 1,700 unionized employees as their contract expired and hired replacement workers. Becker approved and became heavily involved in an innovative comprehensive campaign which involved a heavily researching the employer's finances, ownership and governance. The research effort exposed the plant's poor safety record, and discovered that Ravenswood Aluminum was controlled by fugitive billionaire Marc Rich. The comprehensive campaign also applied political pressure in Congress to protect the domestic aluminum smelting industry. Becker also pioneered the use of extensive international pressure to encourage Ravenswood Aluminum to end the lockout and bargain a new contract. Becker also organized a campaign to persuade beer companies to stop buying Ravenswood aluminum and prompted the state legislature to investigate the company. In 1992, union workers returned to Ravenswood under a new contract.

The Ravenswood campaign significantly enhanced Becker's reputation and was responsible for his rise to USW's presidency.

== USW presidency ==
Williams retired as president of the Steelworkers at the end of his term in 1993.

Becker ran for and won election as president. He became the first person since Philip Murray to be elected president of the union without an election challenge or the death of a predecessor. He was sworn into office on March 1, 1994.

=== Early strikes ===
Becker was sworn in just hours after 4,700 members struck Wheeling-Pittsburgh Steel. The 11-month strike was a bitter and contentious one. But Becker was able to bring the company back to the bargaining table and win a new contract on favorable terms by using the union's enormous pension fund. The fund's trustees put pressure on Wheeling-Pitt's owners, Dewey Investors, to settle the strike. As Wheeling-Pitt's stock price fell by 50 percent and the pension fund's financial pressures increased, the owners agreed to end the strike. The union at Wheeling-Pitt emerged with a stronger contract, one which included a defined benefit pension plan.

Becker also had to work to resolve an ongoing and lengthy strike in the rubber industry. The United Rubber Workers had struck the Japanese-owned Bridgestone/Firestone tire manufacturer in July 1994. The company subsequently hired more than 6,000 workers to permanently replace the strikers. The 74,000-member Rubber Workers Union voted to return to work without a contract. Although the Rubber Workers had rejected merger with the Steelworkers and other unions in the past, now the union's leadership sought merger. The merger was agreed to just as the workers returned to work, and approved by Rubber Workers' members in July 1995. The rubber workers won immediate access to the Steelworkers' $166 million strike fund, research staff, and highly influential pension fund. Becker pushed for a comprehensive campaign strategy to be used against Bridgestone/Firestone. The Steelworkers worked with Japanese labor unions to press the company to negotiate. An innovative public campaign was used to embarrass the company at major events (including the use of a blimp at the Indianapolis 500). These tactics convinced Bridgestone/Firestone management to return to the bargaining table, and the union eventually signed contract that weakened or eliminated a number of management's demands.

=== Reforms and growth ===
Becker is generally considered a strong Steelworkers president for bringing large numbers of new members into the union, making organizational reforms, and innovative collective bargaining and political programs.

In his first term as president, Becker reduced the number of regional districts from 18 to 12 by forcing several smaller and low-membership districts to merge. He also developed the union's "Rapid Response Program," a membership mobilization effort which was capable of generating tens of thousands of phone calls and messages from members to their representatives in Congress.

Becker also attempted to strengthen the union's collective bargaining efforts. He established the "New Directions" in and the effort to secure union representation on the board of directors of the companies with which it negotiated contracts. Becker also established the "Stand Up for Steel" campaign in 1998, a joint union-employer federal lobbying effort to increase tariffs to help protect the domestic steel industry. Protecting the industry, Becker argued, would help alleviate the pressure on the union's collective bargaining efforts.

Becker also greatly added to the union's membership. In July 1995, the union absorbed the 74,000-member United Rubber Workers. In January 1997, the 140,000-member Aluminum, Brick and Glass Workers Union also merged with the USW, and in 1999 the Canadian division of the Transportation Communications International Union agreed to leave their parent union and join the USW. However, a planned merger with the United Auto Workers and International Association of Machinists collapsed.

=== AFL-CIO and other positions ===
Becker was elected a vice president of the AFL-CIO on February 24, 1994. In this role, he sat on the federation's executive council, and chaired the council's Economic Policy Committee. In 2000, Becker was instrumental in winning an early AFL-CIO endorsement of Al Gore in his race for president of the United States.

Becker was also active in international union affairs. He was a member of the executive committee of the International Metalworkers' Federation and chair of the World Rubber Council of the International Federation of Chemical, Energy, Mine and General Workers' Unions. President Bill Clinton appointed him to the President's Export Council, and he served on the United States Trade and Environmental Policy Advisory Committee.

== Retirement and death ==
George Becker resigned unexpectedly as president of the United Steelworkers on February 28, 2001, seven months before his term was to end. No reason for his sudden retirement was given. He was succeeded by Leo Gerard.

Becker died in Gibsonia, Pennsylvania (a suburb of Pittsburgh), on February 3, 2007, from prostate cancer, aged 78.

== Sources ==
- "Becker Takes Over as USWA President." Iron Age/New Steel. April 1994.
- Breihan, Bill. "Long Strike Ends at Wheeling-Pitt." Labor Notes. September 1997.
- Bronfenbrenner, Kate and Juravich, Tom. Ravenswood: The Steelworkers' Victory and the Revival of American Labor. Ithaca, N.Y.: Cornell University Press/ILR Press, 1999. ISBN 0-8014-8666-1
- "Contract Is Approved, Ending Steel Strike." New York Times. August 13, 1997.

== Sources ==
- Franklin, Stephen. "George Becker: 1928-2007." Chicago Tribune. February 6, 2007.
- "Gerard Succeeds Becker at USWA." New Steel. February 1, 2001.
- Gilpin, Kenneth. "Rubber Workers' Union Acts to Merge With Steelworkers." New York Times. May 13, 1995.
- Greenhouse, Steven. "Accord Reached in Dispute at Tire Company." New York Times. November 7, 1996.
- Greenhouse, Steven. "Steel Union Uses Indy 500 to Press Its Boycott." New York Times. May 26, 1996.
- Greenhouse, Steven. "Strikers Use Novel Tactics In Bid to End Steel Impasse." New York Times. July 23, 1997.
- Greenhouse, Steven. "Union Leader Warns Gore On Support for China Bill." New York Times. May 12, 2000.
- Hevesi, Dennis. "George Becker, Who Led Steelworkers Through Period of Growth, Dies at 78." New York Times. February 6, 2007.
- Kilborn, Peter. "Three Big Unions Are Set to Merge, Creating a Giant." New York Times. July 28, 1995.
- Mandak, Joe. "Becker to Resign as Steelworkers' Union President Feb. 28." Associated Press. December 14, 2000.
- Noble, Barbara Presley. "Different Tactics in Labor's Battles", New York Times, September 6, 1992.
- Scolieri, Peter. "Becker Preaches to Execs", American Metal Market, June 29, 1994.
- Wayne, Leslie. "American Steel At the Barricades." New York Times, December 10, 1998.
- Who's Who in America. 59th ed. New Providence, New Jersey: Marquis Who's Who, 2004. ISBN 0-8379-6982-4

Trade union offices
Preceded by Lynn R. Williams	President of the United Steelworkers; 1994–2001	Succeeded by Leo Gerard
