= Steel strike of 1959 =

Strike in the United States

1959 Steel Strike
- Part of Labor Unions
- Date: July 15 – November 7, 1959 (67 years ago)
- Location: United States

Parties
United Steelworkers of America	Steel Industry

Number
519,000	

The steel strike of 1959 was a 116-day labor union strike (July 15 – November 7, 1959) by members of the United Steelworkers of America (USWA) that idled the steel industry throughout the United States. The strike occurred over management's demand that the union give up a contract clause which limited management's ability to change the number of workers assigned to a task or to introduce new work rules or machinery which would result in reduced hours or numbers of employees. The strike's effects persuaded President Dwight D. Eisenhower to invoke the back-to-work provisions of the Taft-Hartley Act. The union sued to have the Act declared unconstitutional, but the Supreme Court upheld the law.

The union eventually retained the contract clause and won minimal wage increases. On the other hand, the strike led to significant importation of foreign steel for the first time in U.S. history, which replaced the domestic steel industry in the long run. The strike remained the longest work stoppage in the American steel industry until the steel strike of 1986.

== Background ==
The USWA was an empowering and militant organization started by Philip Murray who was an outspoken advocate for fair wages among mill workers. In 1946, a dispute between the USWA and Benjamin Fearless, the chairman of United States Steel Corporation, came to the attention of President Truman. At the time, US Steel was a highly profitable and workers felt their wages should be increased. Intense bargaining ensued, and federal officials, including John Snyder the Reconversion Director and Charles Bowles from the Price Administration, attempted to broker an agreement by freezing steel prices at $2.40 a ton in the hopes of taming inflation. As the prospects of a strike increased, President Truman offered his compromise of “an eighteen and one-half cent increment in wages and four dollars-per-ton price boost.” Fearless held firm, however, and a short one month long strike ensued until Truman offered another compromise of “an additional one dollar-per-ton price raise.”

Short strikes became a pattern between Murray and Fearless and happened again in 1949 and 1952 usually ending with some sort of government brokered agreement. Philip Murray died of a heart attack in November 1952, and in 1953, the USWA executive board named David J. McDonald president.

McDonald emphasized enhanced fringe benefits. The election of Dwight Eisenhower as US president and Republican majorities in the United States Congress (at least from 1952 to 1954) made expansion of social programs unlikely, but Eisenhower indeed would extend many of Roosevelt's programs.

Subsequently, McDonald focused negotiations on benefits such as unemployment compensation, health insurance, pensions, tuition reimbursement and other items. Throughout the 1950s, however, McDonald felt an intense rivalry with the United Auto Workers (UAW). The UAW often won better wage and benefit packages than the Steelworkers and were able to obtain the closed shop. McDonald's negotiating stands often reflected the interunion jealousy.

McDonald led the Steelworkers on strike in 1956, winning substantial wage increases, unemployment benefits, layoff rights, and improved pensions.

== Causes ==
American steel and the USWA were in distress for a long time, searching for their own rights within the company. Prior to the 1959 steel strike the USWA was operating under the 1956 labor agreement that provided minimal wage increases despite inflationary pressure and increases in the price of steel. In order to maximize profits, domestic steel producers imported more foreign steel, which angered further union workers and made a strike imminent.

Prior to the strike union officials urged local and state politicians to use their influence to secure a more favorable contract. For example, Tennessee state senator Estes Kefauver wrote to the White House to demand that the President take action. "I again urge you to use the full powers of your office in order to prevent this disastrous occurrence [i.e. price hikes]. I am confident that if you would bring together the leaders of the steel industry and the United Steel Workers of America, a realistic hold-the-line price-wage program could be developed."

Prior to the 1959 strike, the major American steel companies were reporting high profits which led McDonald and Steelworkers general counsel Arthur J. Goldberg to request a major wage increase. Industry negotiators refused to grant a wage increase unless McDonald agreed to a substantial alteration or an elimination of Section 2(b) of the union's national master contract.

Section 2(b) of the steelworkers' contract limited management's ability to change the number of workers assigned to a task or to introduce new work rules or machinery that would result in reduced hours or fewer employees. Management claimed that it helped featherbedding and reduced the competitiveness of the American steel industry.

Although McDonald was a strong advocate for wage increases, his "shaky leadership" did not put the union in a good position prior to the strike. McDonald characterized management's proposals as an attempt to break the union. Negotiations broke off, and the contract expired on July 1, 1959.

== Strike ==
President Eisenhower asked both sides to extend the agreement and resume bargaining. McDonald and Goldberg offered to extend the contract by one year. They also proposed creating a joint committee to study changes to Section 2(b) and to the contract's benefit structure. Steelmakers rejected the offer.

On July 15, 500,000 steelworkers went on strike. The strike shuttered nearly every steel mill in the country. By the end of August, the Department of Defense voiced concern that there would not be enough steel to meet national defense needs in a crisis.

The AFL–CIO quickly began to pressure McDonald to end the strike. Its president, George Meany, was willing to support the strike if it did not affect national security negatively. The strike was also affecting the automaking industry, which was threatening to lay off tens of thousands of Walter Reuther's members from a steel shortage.

On September 28, 1959, Eisenhower met privately with McDonald and Goldberg and threatened to invoke the back-to-work provisions of the Taft–Hartley Act. McDonald was unwilling to budge on Section 2(b) without other concessions from the steelmakers. The steel companies, realizing that they could wait until Eisenhower forced union members back to work, refused to make any such concessions.

=== Invocation of Taft–Hartley ===
Eisenhower set in motion the Taft–Hartley machinery on October 7 and appointed a Board of Inquiry. However, Eisenhower limited the Board's mandate to clarifying the issues rather than recommending a settlement. Realizing that the strike could linger despite the use of the Taft–Hartley provisions, management offered a three-year contract with small improvements in pay and fringe benefits and binding arbitration over Section 2(b). McDonald rejected the offer. He proposed a contract similar to his proposal of early July but reduced the union's wage and benefit demands and limited the contract to two rather than three years. Working from a plan devised by Goldberg, McDonald also proposed a nine-member committee consisting of three members from labor, management, and the public to study and resolve work-rule issues. Management rejected the new proposal.

The Board of Inquiry issued its final report on October 19 and declared that there was no chance of a negotiated settlement.

On October 20, the Department of Justice petitioned the federal district court for western Pennsylvania for a Taft–Hartley injunction ordering the steelworkers back to work. Goldberg argued that the Taft–Hartley Act was unconstitutional, but the district court ruled for the government on October 21. However, the court agreed to a stay of the injunction until the matter was fully settled. The union appealed to the Third Circuit Court of Appeals in Philadelphia and lost again on October 27. The United States Supreme Court granted certiorari and set argument for November 3, 1959.

=== Settlement with Kaiser Steel ===
Meanwhile, a budding friendship between Goldberg and Kaiser Steel heir Edgar Kaiser led to an independent settlement between the union and Kaiser Steel on October 26. Although the Steelworkers won only a fractionally higher wage increase than the steelmakers had proposed, the settlement included the nine-member committee, proposed earlier by Goldberg and McDonald.

=== Defeat in Supreme Court ===
On November 7, 1959, on the 116th day of the strike, the Supreme Court upheld the appellate court's findings. In Steelworkers v. United States, 361 U.S. 39 (1959), in an 8–1 per curiam decision, the court upheld the constitutionality of the Taft-Hartley Act. The justices affirmed the district court's injunction, ordering the workers back to work for an 80-day cooling-off period.

McDonald reluctantly ordered his members back to work, but productivity slowed from extremely poor relationships between workers and managers. The Taft–Hartley Act required management to make a last offer and for union members to vote on this proposal. Management proposed minimal improvements in wages and benefits and the elimination of Section 2(b). McDonald turned management of the union over to Goldberg to concentrate the legal and bargaining work in one set of hands. Goldberg convinced the leadership of the union to reject the proposal, and the members followed suit.

=== Nixon's intervention ===
Rejecting the contract was a dangerous tactic and could have broken the union if not for the support of Vice President Richard Nixon. Nixon planned to run for president in 1960 and offered his services in the hopes of negotiating a settlement, which might win him labor's backing.

The Board of Inquiry, meanwhile, reconvened on November 10 and issued a second report on January 6, 1960. The major issues, the Board said, remained the size of the wage increase and Section 2(b).

In December, Nixon met privately with the steelmakers and cautioned them that the Democratic Congress would soon begin hearings on the steel strike. Neither Republicans nor Democrats would support the steel companies if the strike triggered an election-year recession, and Nixon urged management to accept the terms of the Kaiser Steel settlement. Industry executives agreed to a new contract, similar to the Kaiser Steel settlement, in the last week of December.

== Settlement ==
The Taft-Hartley Act was invoked with one key stipulation, management must submit their final offer by “the sixtieth day of the 80 day cooling off period.” Workers had the option to decline the offer and strike again, allowing them the freedom of choice if they felt their expectations were unmet. The strike ended on January 4, 1959, preserving section 2(b) and providing for a 30-month contract through June 1962. The USWA received wage increases of 7 cents an hour, and health benefits and pensions were improved greatly. The original bargaining points from steel management were completely ignored and most of management's demands were not met.

Eisenhower saw this as a big victory for “voluntary bargaining free of governmental involvement.” Because management had to either make a final decision or deal with another crippling strike, US Steel CEO Roger M. Blough did not have the same view of the settlement stating;

“The union's refusal of [our earlier] offer created a serious deadlock. The union not only refused to bargain lower but after negotiating settlements in other industries, withdrew its previous offer and raised its demands very substantially. So it was at this point-and under these circumstances, that administration officials in Washington sought to bring the parties together and eventually recommended a settlement which both parties ultimately accepted.”

Labor was obviously pleased that it gained more than it expected.

== Impact ==
In the long run, the strike devastated the American steel industry. More than 85 percent of U.S. steel production had been shut down for almost four months. Hungry for steel, American industries began importing steel from foreign sources. Steel imports had been negligible prior to 1959. But during the strike, basic U.S. industries found Japanese and Korean steel to be less costly than American steel even after accounting for importation costs. The sudden shift toward imported steel set in motion a series of events, which led to the gradual decline of the American steel industry.

The strike also eventually ended McDonald's tenure as president of the Steelworkers. Eager to avoid a repetition of the 1959 strike, McDonald worked with steel industry executives to widen the mandate of the new nine-member commissions (now known as "Human Relations Committees"). A three-year national steel contract was signed on March 31, 1962. The union agreed not to enforce Section 2 (b) and permitted increased automation, with a percentage of the profits from automation going to wage increases. However, union members began to feel McDonald was not protecting their interests.

In 1965, Iorwith Wilbur Abel challenged McDonald for the presidency of the union. The February 9 election was a bitter one. Voting irregularities and challenged ballots delayed a final result until April 30. Abel won by a razor-thin margin of 10,142 votes, out of 600,678 cast.

== See also ==
- List of US strikes by size
- 1952 steel strike
- Steel strike of 1986

== Works cited ==
- "Abel Is Sworn in By Steelworkers." The New York Times. June 2, 1965.
- "Aspirin for Steel." Time. November 16, 1959.
- Daniels, Lee A. "David J. McDonald, Retired Head of Steelworkers Union, Dies at 76." The New York Times. August 9, 1979.
- Fink, Gary M., ed. Biographical Dictionary of American Labor. Westport, Ct.: Greenwood Press, 1984. ISBN 0-313-22865-5
- Herling, John. Right to Challenge: People and Power in the Steelworkers Union. New York: Harper & Row, 1972. ISBN 0-06-011834-2
- Kelly, George and Beachler, Edward. Man of Steel: The Story of David J. McDonald. New York: North American Book Co., 1954.
- Libertella, Anthony. "The Steel Strike of 1959: Labor, Management, and Government Relations." Doctoral dissertation, Ohio State University, 1972. ISBN 9798659182987
- "Man of Steel." Time. July 9, 1956.
- McDonald, David J. Union Man: The Life of a Labor Statesman. New York: E.P.Dutton & Co., 1969.
- Metzgar, Jack. Striking Steel: Solidarity Remembered. Philadelphia, Pa.: Temple University Press, 2000. ISBN 1-56639-739-1
- Pomfret, John D. "Abel Declared Victor in Steel Vote." The New York Times. May 1, 1965.
- Rose, James D. "The Struggle over Management Rights at US Steel, 1946–1960: A Reassessment of Section 2-B of the Collective Bargaining Contract." Business History Review. 72:3 (Autumn 1998).
- Seeger, Murray. "M'Donald Yields Union Presidency." The New York Times. May 20, 1965.
- Shils, Edward B. "Arthur Goldberg: Proof of the American Dream." Monthly Labor Review. January 1997.
- Stebenne, David L. Arthur J. Goldberg: New Deal Liberal. New York: Oxford University Press, 1996. ISBN 0-19-507105-0
- Tiffany, Paul A. The Decline of American Steel: How Management, Labor, and Government Went Wrong. New York: 1988. PP.158–165 ISBN 0-19-504382-0
