= Edward Sadlowski =

American trade unionist

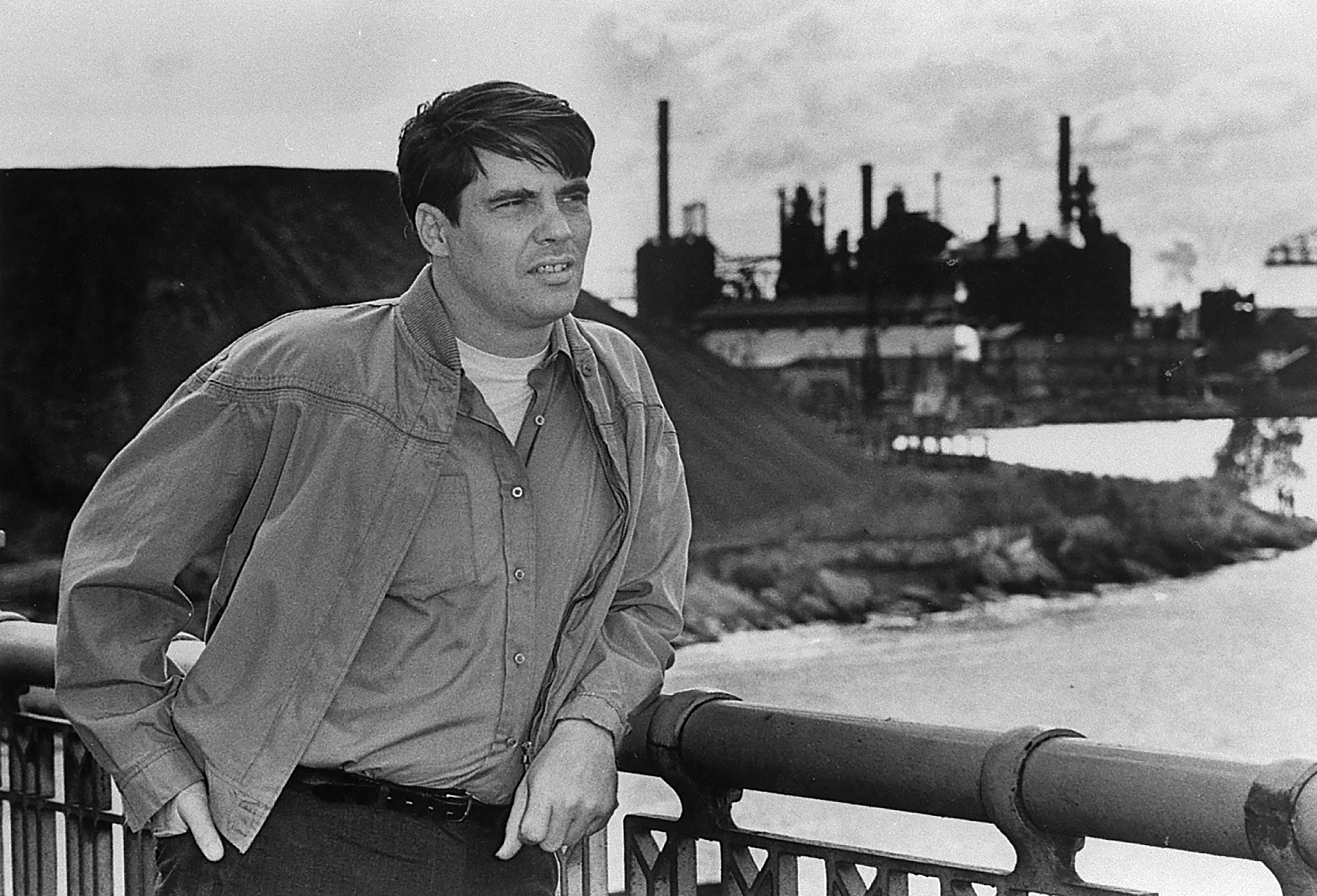
Sadlowski near the South Works in Chicago, Illinois c. 1977

Edward Sadlowski (September 10, 1938 – June 10, 2018) was an American labor activist associated with Steelworkers Fight Back, a rank-and-file movement against corruption in the international United Steelworkers of America union. Sadlowski became the youngest president of his local union at U.S. Steel's South Works, later served as director of District 31 (the union's largest district, encompassing Chicago and Gary, Indiana), and became known nationally during his unsuccessful attempt to become the international union's president in 1977.

== Early and family life ==
Edward Eugene Sadlowski was born on September 10, 1938, in Chicago, Illinois. His father helped organize labor at the Inland Steel Company. Sadlowski left school in the eleventh grade and joined the United States Army during the Korean War. He married Marlene Sadlowski, who survived him, as did their son Edward Sadlowski Jr. and daughters Susan Sadlowski Garza, Patricia Hoyt and Diane Agelson.

== Career ==
In 1956, Sadlowski started work as a machinist's apprentice at U.S. Steel in Chicago, which was represented by Local 65 of the United Steelworkers of America (USWA). He got his nickname "Oil can Eddie" because he often carried an oil can while walking around plants and talking with rank-and-file members. Fellow members elected Sadlowski shop steward of his plant in 1960 and their grievance representative in 1962. The following year Local 65 members elected him president, and in 1964 at age 25 Sadlowski became the youngest person to hold that union office, overseeing about 23,000 workers. He won re-election in 1967.

=== District 31 director election ===
In 1972 long time District 31 director, Joe Germano, announced he was retiring. District 31 was the USWA's largest district, covering the Chicago, Illinois - Gary, Indiana, area with about 128,000 members. Sadlowski announced he candidacy for the director position:

I consider democracy within the union to be he most important single issue. If the steelworkers had been consulted they never would have agreed to an International Executive Board which excluded blacks, Latinos, and women. If the steelworkers were consulted they would insist on their right to vote on union contracts in the same manner other unions do. They rightfully feel they are not running their own affairs and are not being represented on the district level.

His opponent, Samuel C. Evett, had the support of the international union, including its president I.W. Able. District 31 included 288 locals and Sadlowski needed nominations from 29 of them to get on the ballot. He conducted a street campaign at plant gates and coffeehouses, bars and restaurants. The international refused to give the Sadlowski campaign a list of the locals, but eventually Sadlowski secured nominations from 40 locals.

The Evett forces noted that Sadlowski was supported by communists and had long opposed the Vietnam War. On election night, the night of the February 13, 1973, Sadlowski was winning by about 3500 votes around midnight when further votes stopped coming in. When votes starting coming in again, Evett was winning and was ultimately declared the winner by 2,000 votes.

Sadlowski protested the election and sued the union. The U.S. Department of Labor investigated and found massive fraud, including that the official union leadership at the Gary Works U.S. Steel local (one of the district's biggest) had faked ballots. A federal court fight followed, which led Evett in July 1974 to agree to a new election. Meanwhile, Sadlowski's supporters had built an organization known as "Steelworkers Fightback". When the election was held between November 12 and November 15, 1974. Sadlowski won by 20,000 votes (a 2-1 margin).

=== United Steelworkers of America presidential race ===
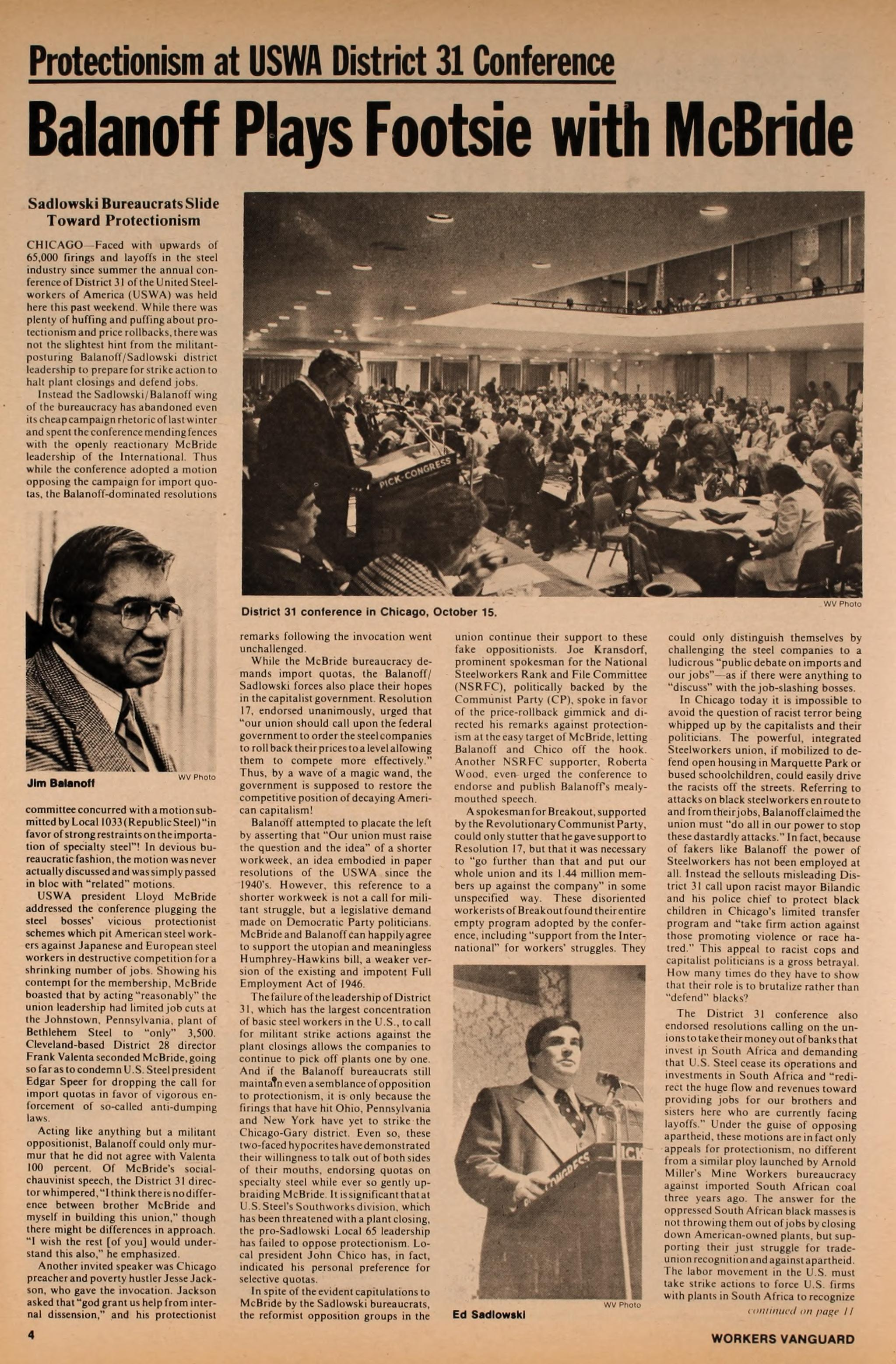
Sadlowski in an article published in Workers Vanguard, October 28, 1977

After Sadlowski won the district director election, he traveled around the country talking to steelworker groups about whether to run for international president. The international offered Sadlowski a deal to give him the staff he wanted in his district and would stay out of the district's political affairs. In return, it wanted Sadlowski to stay out of international union politics. Sadlowski rejected the deal, commenting:

[Steelworker President] Able hated me with such a vengeance he wouldn't even say hello. Once in San Francisco I got in an elevator and it's just me and Able. He starts pressing buttons to get off. At the convention center I went into the men's room to take a piss, and he's at the next urinal going through gyrations just to get out.

Sadlowski became a candidate for president of the Steelworkers in 1977, running at the head of a reformist slate (Steelworkers Fightback). During the campaign he liked to say, "There is a fire in the steelworker union and I'm not going to piss on it."

During the 1977 election, Sadlowski ran against Lloyd McBride, who received substantial support from union officers and staff. The international denied Sadlowski access to all membership lists. Since the Steelworkers Union represents many jobs that are not related to steel, Sadlowski sent union activists from Chicago around the country to help campaign at many of those locals. During the campaign Sadlowski gave a controversial interview with Penthouse magazine in which he said he would not want his children to work in a steel mill:

Working 40 hours a week in a steel mill drains the lifeblood of a man. There are workers there right now who are full of poems and doctors who are operating cranes. We've run the workers into the ground. Ultimately, society has nothing to show for it but waste. A doctor is more useful that a man with a capacity to be a doctor spending his life on the crane. Such men are kept from functioning at their best, not only by U.S. Steel but by doctors themselves. I advocate putting people who work in the steel mills into medical professions. They have the brainpower to become scientists, yet the system sells them short. There's no open marketplace.

About 580,000 of the union's 1.4 million members voted. McBride won with 328,000 to Sadlowski's 249,000 votes, but Sadlowski beat McBride in the large steel locals. He also won in the United States-based locals, but the vote in Canada was overwhelmingly for McBride (McBride had a Canadian, Lynn Williams, running on his slate for international secretary). Canada also did not have the labor law fraud protections that exist in the U.S.

Sadlowski had raised donations from both inside and outside the union. His enemies had charged that if he was elected outsiders would run the union, and Sadlowski's failure to respond forcibly may have cost him many votes. When the USWA at their 1978 convention outlawed such donations, Sadlowski sued to overturn the union rule on First Amendment grounds. Although he initially won his case at the federal district and appellate court levels, the U.S. Supreme Court overturned the rulings in 1982.

== Later life ==
After the 1977 election, Sadlowski became a subdistrict director in the South Chicago area, but "Steelworkers Fightback" disintegrated. He never ran for elected union office again. He retired from the union in 1993.

From 1993 until 2012, Sadlowski served on a local panel of the Illinois Labor Relations Board. In 2012, the Illinois Labor History Society inducted him into its Union Hall of Honor.

In 2015, his daughter, Susan Sadlowski Garza was elected to the Chicago City Council representing the 10th ward.

== Death and media portrayals ==
Sadlowski died in Fort Myers, Florida, on June 10, 2018, after suffering from dementia for several years. He was survived by his widow, children, 11 grandchildren and two great-grandchildren.

Sadlowski was featured in the first chapter of the novel Never a City So Real: A Walk in Chicago, as well as the history Homestead, and memoir Which Side Are You On? He was a member of the advisory board for the Association for Union Democracy.

== Sources ==
- Kotlowitz, Alex. Never a City So Real: A Walk in Chicago. New York: Crown Publishing Group, 2004. ISBN 1-4000-4621-1
