= Steelworkers Fight Back =

Movement against corruption in the United Steelworkers union

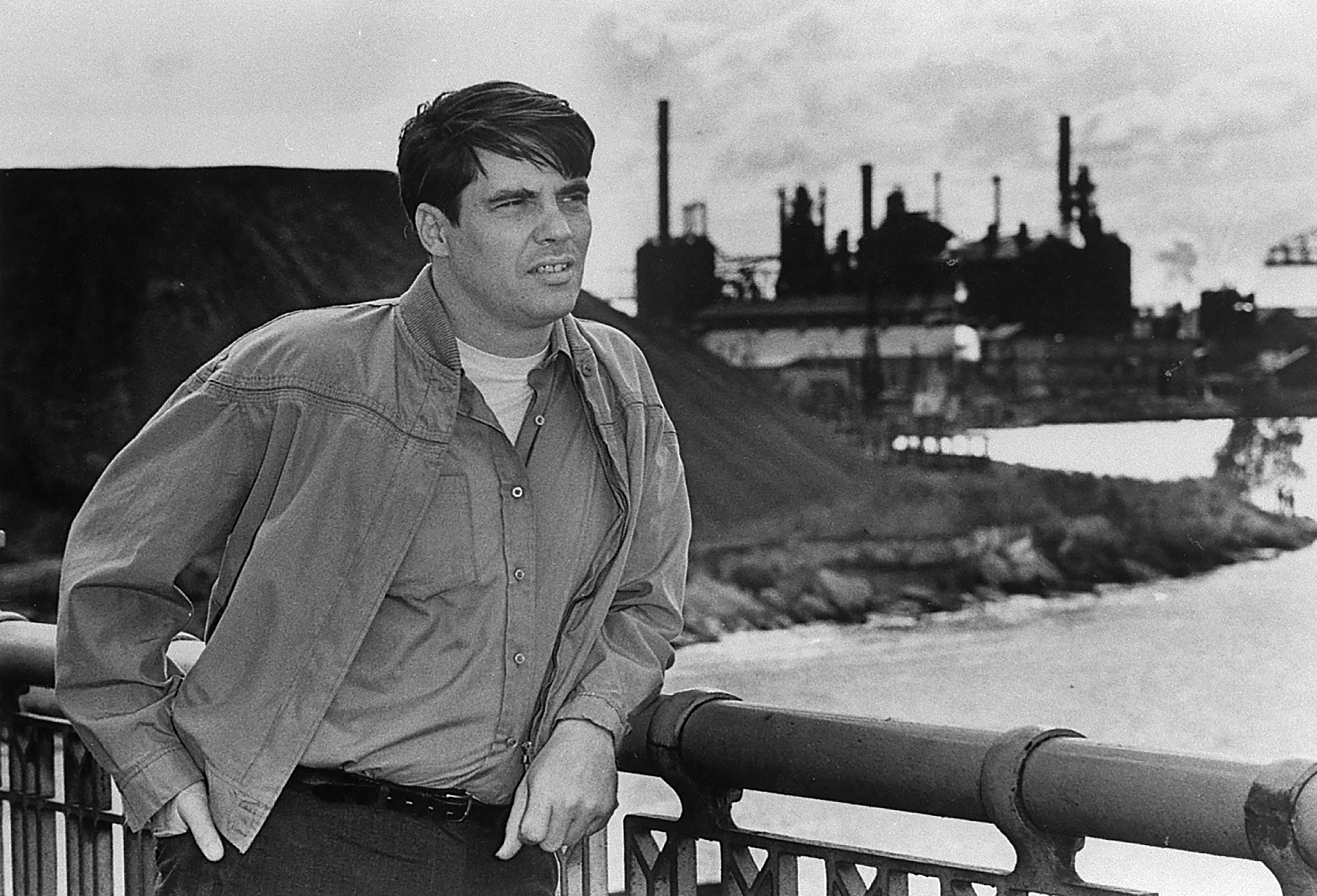
Edward Sadlowski, leader of Steelworkers Fight Back, near the South Works in Chicago, Illinois c. 1977

Steelworkers Fight Back was a rank-and-file movement against corruption in the international United Steelworkers union. It was founded in 1974, after Edward Sadlowski was elected president of USWA District 31 based in the Chicago area.

== See also ==
- Teamsters for a Democratic Union
- Miners for Democracy
