= Industrial Union Department =

The Industrial Union Department (IUD) was a division of the AFL-CIO, bringing together industrial unions.

== History ==
In 1955, the American Federation of Labor (AFL) merged with the Congress of Industrial Organizations (CIO), forming the AFL-CIO. The CIO had been founded to promote industrial unionism, and the new federation created a department to bring together industrial unions. Its initial leadership was similar to that of the CIO, and most of its affiliated membership came from former CIO unions, although 35 AFL unions affiliated, compared to 31 CIO unions.

By 1985, the department had 57 affiliates, representing about 5.5 million members. At the time, it spent about one-third of its funds on organizing, providing co-ordinators to direct the organizing activities of member unions, with a focus on the south. It also arranged consolidated bargaining across unions with members in a single company, and campaigned on health and safety, which resulted in the Occupational Safety and Health Act. It also campaigned for national industrial policy, and produced analyses of international trade and pensions policy.

The department was disbanded in 1999.

== Leadership ==
=== Presidents ===
1955: Walter Reuther
1968: I. W. Abel
1977: Jacob Clayman
1979: Howard D. Samuel
1992: Peter DiCicco

=== Secretary-Treasurers ===
1955: James B. Carey
1965: Post vacant
1973: Jacob Clayman
1979: Elmer Chatak
Joseph Uehlein

== See also ==
- Industrial Union Department v. American Petroleum Institute
