= Where's Joe? =

1972 film

Where’s Joe?
- Directed by: Robert E. Haviland
- Written by: William D. Ellis (Editorial Services)
- Produced by: United Steelworkers of America and Coordinating Committee U.S. Steel Companies
- Starring: I. W. Abel James P. Griffin, Rev. William T. Hogan SJ, Edwin H. Gott, R. Heath Larry
- Cinematography: Harry Horrocks
- Production company: Cinécraft Productions, Inc.
- Release date: 1972
- Running time: 25 minutes
- Country: United States
- Language: English

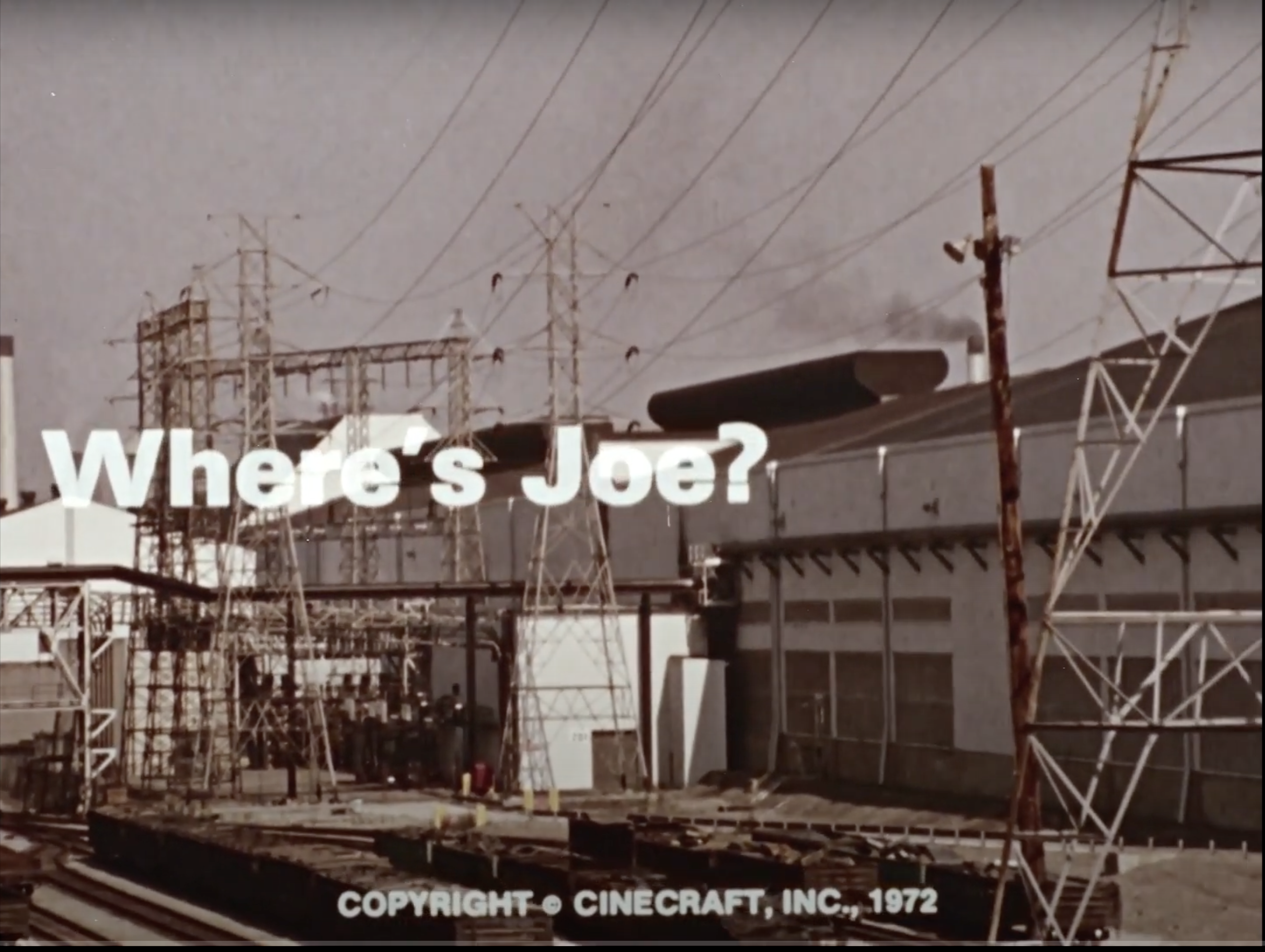
Where’s Joe? (1972), a 25-minute, color documentary film, tackles the problem of productivity and foreign competition in the American steel industry.

Where’s Joe? (1927), a 25-minute, color documentary film was a joint venture between the United Steel Workers union led by I. W. Abel and the management of the ten largest steel companies in the U.S.

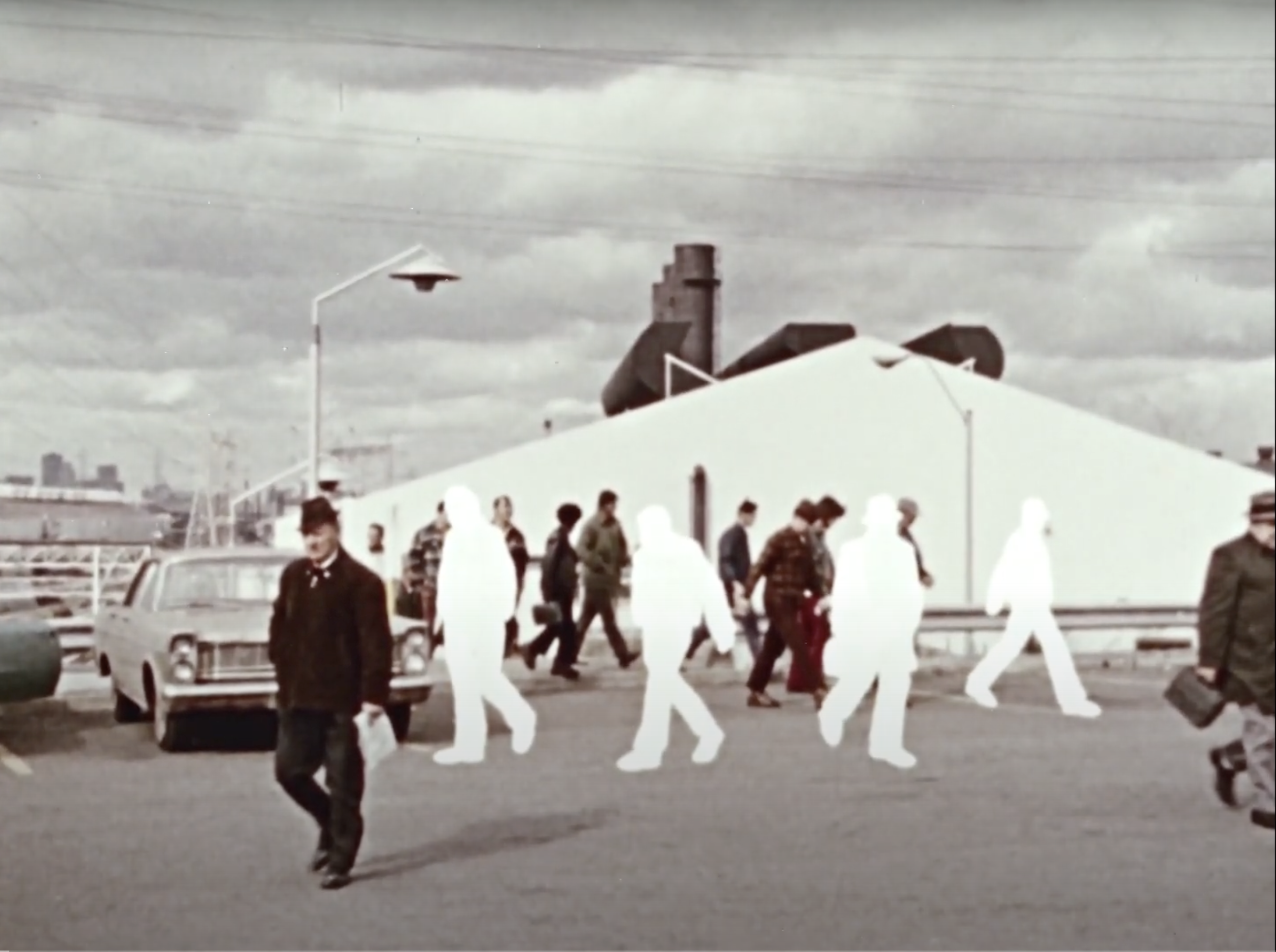
The “Joe” in the movie title refers to the “Joes” who no longer have jobs in U.S. steel mills because of increased imported steel.

The movie tackles the problem of productivity and foreign competition in the American steel industry. The "Joe" in the movie title refers to the workers who have lost their jobs in U.S. steel mills due to increased competition from foreign steel mills. "Joe has been replaced by Jose, Hans, or Toshika, all productive steel workers, but not in the U.S.," the narrator in the film says.

The film targeted the half-million people who work in the steel industry, from steel company presidents and steel union leaders to millhands. The film was also shown for investors and analysts at steel company shareholder and civic group meetings. It played on TV in 16 cities and ran as a “short” between features at commercial theatres.

The movie is credited with helping put in place the first "no-strike" negotiation in the history of the U.S. steel industry.

== Background ==
Where's Joe? (1972) points to the disastrous effects of foreign competition on such American industries as automobiles, electronics, footwear, textiles and sporting goods. Where’s Joe? contends that because steel is a critical component for many American-made products, the slightest possibility that bargaining might result in a strike sets up “hedge buying” by American steel users to accumulate inventories just in case shipments are shut off. The movie was designed to convince labor that strikes – even talks of strikes - were harmful.

The film was a key component in an American steel company educational campaign equating the threat of a strike with the loss of jobs. Along with the movie, the message was carried into steelworkers’ homes by way of comic books, educational television, and even a game tentatively called “hedge” after the practice of hedge buying of steel in anticipation of a strike.

An article on the movie in the Pittsburgh Post-Gazette said the Wheeling-Pittsburgh Steel Corp’s Steubenville plant bought nine copies of the film and ran the film 200 times. Two projectors ran around the clock. An estimated 18,000 people saw the movie on company time. Most other U.S. steel companies had similar plans.

Some members of the United Steel Workers union resented union president I.W. Abel’s cooperation with steel mill management in producing Where's Joe? (1972) and making it compulsory viewing for union members.]] members of the United Steelworkers union resented union president I.W. Abel’s cooperation with steel mill management in producing "Where's Joe?" and making it compulsory viewing for union members. Kartemquin Films produced a rebuttal documentary titled Where’s I.W. Abel? that accused the leader of selling out for his cooperation with management and giving up workers' right to strike.

Cinecraft Productions was given the Where's Joe? project in October 1972. Two months later, on December 14, 1972, the movie premiered at a joint union-management conference on productivity in Washington, D.C.

In 2023, the National Film Preservation Foundation, an organization created by the U.S. Congress to help save America's film heritage, awarded the Hagley Museum and Library a grant to preserve a print of the film discovered in the Cinecraft studio basement in 2021.

== Synopsis ==
Where's Joe? opens by asking where are the 130,000 workers that used to make steel in America plants. The narrator points out that the American consumer couldn't care less where the steel comes from in the products they buy. American steel mill output is down, but the American economy is using more steel, and steel demand is increasing. U.S. steel jobs have declined due to foreign competition. And what’s more, most foreign mills are as up-to-date as American plants, and their productivity rates are improving faster than those in the U.S.

Foreign steel producers use the every-three-year steel contract negotiation cycle in place in the U.S. to strengthen their position in the U.S. market. Large users of steel begin building their inventories before contract expiration, allowing them to continue operating in the event of a steel strike. Then, even if a settlement is made without a strike, there’s a terrific drop in demand for steel as customers reduce their inventories to normal levels. During these build-up periods, the movie points out, foreign producers can demand longer time purchase commitments from U.S. steel customers.

The movie then points out that foreign competition ultimately captures a larger share of the U.S. market, extending well beyond the contract negotiation deadline.

Where's Joe? then points to the disastrous effects of foreign competition on such American industries as electronics, footwear, textiles, and sporting goods. The narrator also points to the millions of foreign-built automobiles now being sold in the U.S., each of which represents steel that was not made here.

Don’t American steel producers have a transportation advantage to offset foreign high productivity? Certainly. However, foreign steel makers are building their plants where they can utilize cheap water transport, and with the vast waterway systems in the U.S., foreign steel can reach right into the heart of U.S. markets.

Isn’t there a voluntary quota in which foreign markets agreed to limit shipments to the U.S.? Yes, but voluntary import quotas are interim measures. They help stem the tide of steel imports, but they will not completely solve the problem. Firstly, enforcement of quota agreements is almost nonexistent, and increasing tonnages are being poured into the U.S. from nations that are not parties to the agreements.

What’s the solution? American steel producers need to eliminate the crisis bargaining cycle that boomerangs against American-made steel, causing steel companies to play “musical chairs” with jobs. American steel producers need to head realistically into the challenge zone, where the game will be won or lost, in terms of productivity.

== Credits ==
- Bob Haviland, Director
- Harry Horrocks, Photography
- William D. Ellis, Editorial Services
- Cinecraft Productions Inc., Producing studio
