= I. W. Abel =

American labor leader (1908–1987)

Iorwith Wilbur Abel

3rd President of the United Steelworkers
- In office 1965–1977
- Preceded by: David J. McDonald
- Succeeded by: Lloyd McBride

Personal details
- Born: August 11, 1908 Magnolia, Ohio
- Died: August 10, 1987 (aged 78) Malvern, Ohio
- Occupation: Labor leader

Iorwith Wilbur Abel (August 11, 1908 – August 10, 1987), better known as I. W. Abel, was an American labor leader.

== Early life and career ==
Abel was born in Magnolia, Ohio, in 1908, to John Franklin Abel, a German blacksmith, and Mary Ann (née Jones) Abel, the daughter of a Welsh coal miner. He attended local public school and graduated from Magnolia High School in 1925.

He attended college at Canton Actual Business College in Canton, Ohio, but he did not graduate.

In 1925, he worked as a molder for the American Sheet and Tin Plate Company (now U.S. Steel) in Canton. He switched jobs often and found employment at the Canton Malleable Iron Company, the Timken Roller Bearing Company and the Colonial Foundry.

Abel married Bernice Joseph in 1930. The couple had two children. She died in 1982, and Abel married Martha Turvey a few years later.

Laid off during the Great Depression, Abel worked at a brickmaking company loading a kiln at less than a quarter his former pay. Convinced that a union would have protected him from losing his job, he became active in the American labor movement.

== Union career ==
In 1936, Abel found work again at Timken Roller Bearing and, with the assistance of the Steel Workers Organizing Committee (SWOC), he organized Steel Workers Local 1123. He remained a member of the local until his death. He proved an effective and strong negotiator and union president, and in one year alone, he led 42 wildcat strikes.

Abel was an active participant in the Little Steel Strike in 1937. His skilled leadership during the strike brought him to the attention of national SWOC officers and staff.

In 1937, Abel was hired by SWOC head the national union's organizing staff. Abel became a protégé of Philip Murray, president of SWOC. When SWOC merged with the Amalgamated Association of Iron and Steel Workers in 1942, to form the United Steel Workers of America (USWA), Abel was appointed director of the Canton District of the USWA and became a member of the executive council of the Ohio CIO Council.

During World War II, Abel served on the National War Labor Board, representing the Congress of Industrial Organizations (CIO).

=== Challenging McDonald ===
Murray died in 1952. USWA secretary-treasurer David J. McDonald was elected president as his successor, and Abel was elected secretary-treasurer. Unlike the flamboyant and vocal McDonald, Abel remained in the background as the union's secretary-treasurer. He was appointed to the CIO-PAC, the CIO's political action committee. He spent most of his time visiting local unions and listening to members.

In the early 1960s, Abel was angered by what he perceived as McDonald's weakness in winning new national contracts for steelworkers. When McDonald altered the union's constitution to permit him to serve two more four-year terms, Abel decided to challenge McDonald in the 1965 presidential election. Abel accused McDonald of being too cozy with employers by substituting fringe benefit gains for wage increases and ignoring members' concerns. The election took place on February 9, 1965. Voting irregularities and challenged ballots delayed a final result until April 30. Abel relied heavily on voting and ballot-challenging procedures established under the relatively new Labor Management Reporting and Disclosure Act (or "Landrum-Griffin Act"). Without the assistance of the new law, it is unclear that he would have won.

However, union officials and federal monitors eventually declared Abel the winner by a razor-thin margin of 10,142 votes, out of 600,678 cast, and on May 20, McDonald declined to challenge the result. Over 7,000 of the votes came from Canadian locals, and Abel spent a greater amount of time than had any of his predecessors protecting the interests of Canadian steelworkers locals. Abel was sworn in as USWA president on June 2, 1965.

=== President of USWA ===
Abel was elected a vice president of the AFL-CIO following his election and served on the federation's executive council. In 1968, he was elected president of the Industrial Union Department, AFL-CIO.

During Abel's presidency, membership in the USWA rose by more than 500,000, as he engineered mergers with the International Union of Mine, Mill, and Smelter Workers in 1967; the United Stone and Allied Product Workers of America in 1971; and the International Union of District 50, Allied and Technical Workers of the United States and Canada in 1972.

Abel also broadened the union's inclusiveness. He encouraged open discussion of controversial issues among the staff and membership and decentralized a number of union functions. He also worked to increase minority participation in local, regional and national union affairs and to end job discrimination by local steelworker unions.

His reforms were not enough. Workers sued the union for race and sex discrimination numerous times in the late 1960s and early 1970s. In 1974, Abel was forced to sign a consent decree to alter seniority rules that discriminated against women and minority workers.

Abel actively sought new federal laws to protect union workers as well. He was a vigorous proponent of workplace health and safety and worked to help pass the Occupational Safety and Health Act in 1970. He was also a strong advocate of the Employee Retirement Income Security Act of 1974, which protected the interests of participants in private pension plans and established the Pension Benefit Guaranty Corporation.

Abel also won several strong national steel and other metals contracts. He established the union's first strike fund and quickly amassed an $85 million balance. He resumed coordinated bargaining with the major steelmakers and established separate bargaining councils for aluminum and other metals industries.

In 1971, record imports of foreign steel led to the layoff of 108,000 steelworkers. Although a new national steel contract was reached without a strike the same year, Abel and the USWA executive council realized that the steel industry's tendency to stockpile steel in anticipation of a strike led to a boom-and-bust cycle, which hurt workers.

In 1972, Abel and representatives of the ten largest steel companies in the United States hired Cinécraft Productions to produce a film, Where's Joe?, to educate steelworkers on the issue of foreign competition in the American steel industry. The movie is credited with helping to establish the first "no-strike" negotiation in the history of the industry.

To counteract the cycle, in 1973, Abel negotiated the Experimental Negotiating Agreement (ENA) with the major steelmakers. Abel agreed not to strike during the 1974 contract talks and agreed to binding arbitration for any bargaining issues that led to impasse.

The ENA proved a great success during the 1974 national steel contract talks. Abel won a $2.00 an hour raise over three years. The union also won the right to engage in local strikes over non-economic working conditions, which the union had agreed to ban in previous contracts.

The ENA contributed to a second round of successful contract talks in 1977; however, employers unilaterally withdrew from the pact in 1980, following the 1979 steel industry recession.

On January 11, 1977, Abel was awarded the Presidential Medal of Freedom by President Gerald Ford.

=== Other roles ===
In 1967, he was appointed an alternate representative of the US delegation to the United Nations.

Abel's strong advocacy of the rights of minorities within the union led him to be appointed in 1967 by President Lyndon Johnson to the Kerner Commission, which was created to investigate the rioting that had occurred that year in Black neighborhoods in more than 150 cities.

In 1971, Abel was appointed to the Economic Stabilization Program, President Richard Nixon's wage and price restraint board. He resigned in 1972 over the program's decision for strict limits to wage increases for workers.

=== Internal opposition ===
Various union leaders and members began to criticize Abel after the 1977 contract. Despite Abel's successes at the bargaining table, steelmakers continued to cut back production, and union membership sank by 650,000. Also, older union members were angry over the 1974 consent decree, which had stripped them of their seniority.

One Abel's most prominent critics was Edward Sadlowski, the director of District 31, then the union's largest district. Sadlowski, a member of the union's Rank and File Caucus, had mounted an insurgent campaign for the post of director of District 31 in 1973. Although he was unsuccessful, he sued to have the election overturned on the grounds that it violated the fair election procedures of the Labor Management Reporting and Disclosure Act.

The election was rerun, with Sadlowski winning in 1974. Sadlowski was widely considered to be a challenger to Abel in the 1977 presidential election.

=== Retirement ===
However, Abel had announced his retirement instead. An Abel protégé, Lloyd McBride, the director of District 34, ran as Abel's successor. Sadlowski ran for the presidency. Abel spent a significant amount of time campaigning for McBride. The election was a bitter one, but McBride won.

After his retirement, Abel moved to Sun City, Arizona. In 1984, he and his new wife moved to Malvern, Ohio.

== Death ==
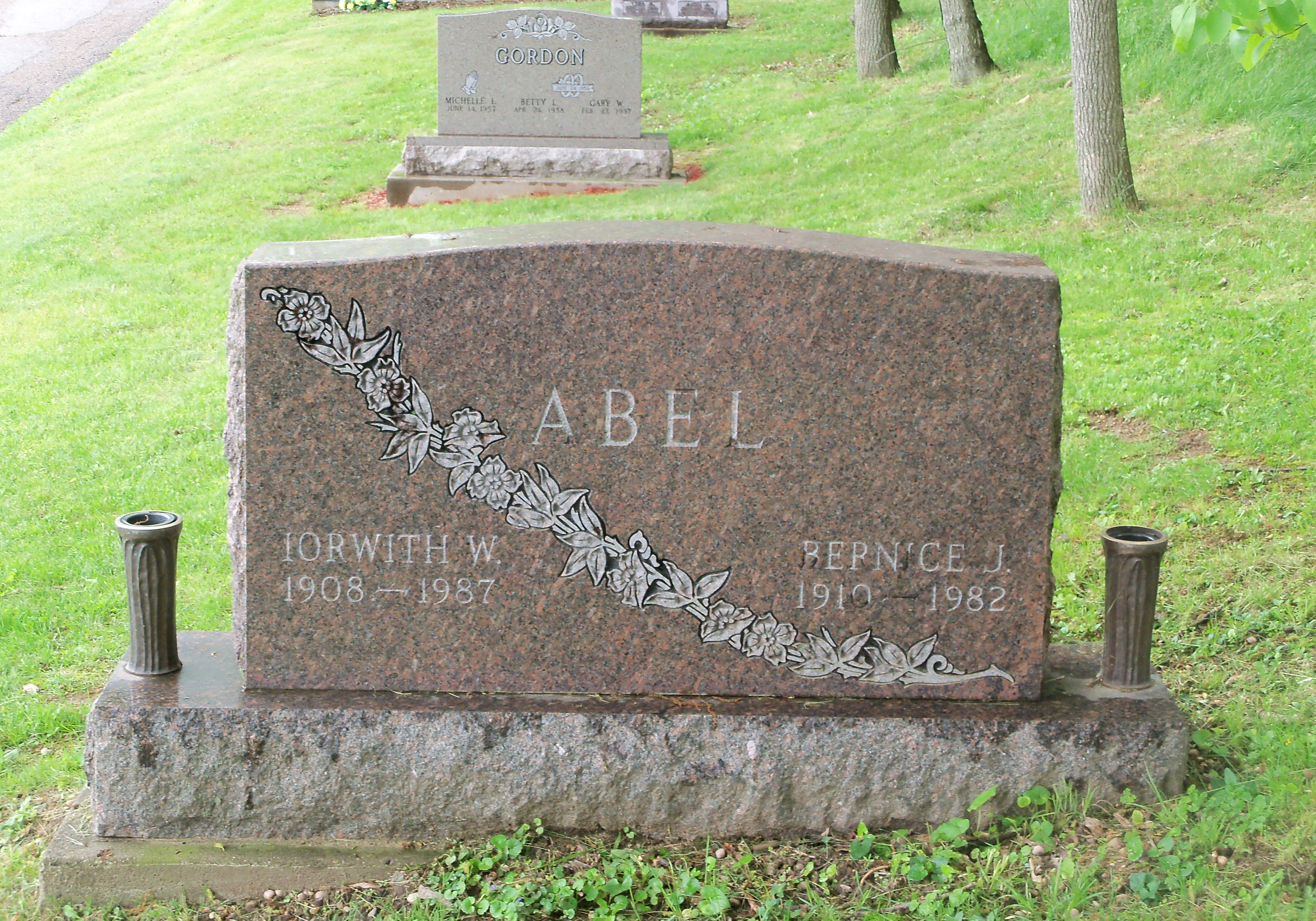
Tombstone in Magnolia Cemetery

Abel died of cancer at his home in Malvern in 1987; he would have turned 79 one day later.

== Sources ==
- "Abel Is Sworn In By Steelworkers." New York Times. June 2, 1965.
- Fink, Gary M., ed. Biographical Dictionary of American Labor. Westport, Conn.: Greenwood Press, 1984. ISBN 0-313-22865-5
- Herling, John. Right to Challenge: People and Power in the Steelworkers Union. New York: Harper & Row, 1972. ISBN 0-06-011834-2
- Hoerr, John P. And the Wolf Finally Came: The Decline of the American Steel Industry. Pittsburgh, Pa.: University of Pittsburgh Press, 1988. ISBN 0-8229-3572-4
- Mangum, Garth L. and McNabb, R. Scott. The Rise, Fall, and Replacement of Industrywide Bargaining in the Basic Steel Industry. New York: M.E. Sharpe, 1997. ISBN 1-56324-982-0
- Pomfret, John D. "Abel Declared Victor in Steel Vote." New York Times. May 1, 1965.
- Seeger, Murray. "M'Donald Yields Union Presidency." New York Times. May 20, 1965.

Trade union offices
Preceded by David J. McDonald	President of the United Steelworkers; 1965 - 1977	Succeeded by Lloyd McBride
Preceded by Walter Reuther	President of the Industrial Union Department, AFL-CIO; 1968–1977	Succeeded by Jacob Clayman
Preceded by Kenneth J. Brown; C. L. Dennis	AFL-CIO delegate to the Trades Union Congress; 1970; With: Teddy Gleason	Succeeded by John Griner; Paul Jennings
