= Industrial Union Department v. American Petroleum Institute =

- Supreme Court of the United States

Argued October 10, 1979 Decided July 2, 1980
- Full case name: Industrial Union Department, AFL-CIO v. American Petroleum Institute, et al.
- Citations: 448 U.S. 607 (more) 100 S. Ct. 2844; 65 L. Ed. 2d 1010; 1980 U.S. LEXIS 55; 10 ELR 20489

Holding
- The Secretary applied the act inappropriately. In order to comply with the statute, the secretary must determine 1) that a health risk of a substance exists at a particular threshold and 2) Decide whether to issue the most protective standard, or issue a standard that weighs the costs and benefits.

Court membership
- Chief Justice Warren E. Burger Associate Justices William J. Brennan Jr. · Potter Stewart; Byron White · Thurgood Marshall; Harry Blackmun · Lewis F. Powell Jr. William Rehnquist · John P. Stevens

Case opinions
- Plurality: Stevens, joined by Burger, Stewart; Powell (parts I, II, III-A, III-B, III-C, III-E)
- Concurrence: Powell
- Concurrence: Rehnquist
- Dissent: Marshall, joined by Brennan, White, Blackmun

Industrial Union Department v. American Petroleum Institute (also known as the Benzene Case), 448 U.S. 607 (1980), was a case decided by the Supreme Court of the United States. This case represented a challenge to the OSHA practice of regulating carcinogens by setting the exposure limit "at the lowest technologically feasible level that will not impair the viability of the industries regulated." OSHA selected that standard because it believed that (1) it could not determine a safe exposure level and that (2) the authorizing statute did not require it to quantify such a level. The AFL Industrial Union Department served as the petitioner; the American Petroleum Institute was the respondent. A plurality on the Court, led by Justice Stevens, wrote that the authorizing statute did indeed require OSHA to demonstrate a significant risk of harm (albeit not with mathematical certainty) in order to justify setting a particular exposure level.

Perhaps more important than the specific holding of the case, the Court noted in dicta that if the government's interpretation of the authorizing statute had been correct, it might violate the nondelegation doctrine. This line of reasoning may represent the "high-water mark" of recent attempts to revive the doctrine.

== Background ==
The Occupational Safety and Health Act of 1970 delegated broad authority to the Secretary of Labor to promulgate standards to ensure safe and healthful working conditions for the Nation's workers (the Occupational Safety and Health Administration (OSHA) being the agency responsible for carrying out this authority). According to Section 3(8), standards created by the secretary must be “reasonably necessary or appropriate to provide safe or healthful employment and places of employment.” Section 6(b)(5) of the statute sets the principle for creating the safety regulations, directing the Secretary to “set the standard which most adequately assures, to the extent feasible, on the basis of the best available evidence, that no employee will suffer material impairment of health or functional capacity…”. At issue in the case, is the Secretary's interpretation of the "extent feasible" to mean that if a material is unsafe he must “set an exposure limit at the lowest technologically feasible level that will not impair the viability of the industries regulated.”

== Opinion of the Court ==
The Court held the Secretary applied the act inappropriately. To comply with the statute, the secretary must determine 1) that a health risk of a substance exists at a particular threshold and 2) Decide whether to issue the most protective standard, or issue a standard that weighs the costs and benefits. Here, the secretary failed to first determine that a health risk of substance existed for the chemical benzene when workers were exposed at 1 part per million. Data only suggested the chemical was unsafe at 10 parts per million. Thus, the secretary had failed the first step of interpreting the statute, that is, finding that the substance posed a risk at that level.

In its reasoning, the Court noted it would be unreasonable to Congress intended to give the Secretary “unprecedented power over American industry.” Such a delegation of power would likely be unconstitutional. The Court also cited the legislative history of the act, which suggested that Congress meant to address major workplace hazards, not hazards with low statistical likelihoods.

=== Concurring opinion ===
In a famous concurrence, Justice Rehnquist argued that the section 6(b)(5) of the statute, which set forth the "extent feasible" principle, should be struck down on the basis of the non-delegation doctrine. The non-delegation doctrine, which has been recognized by the Supreme Court since the era of Chief Justice Marshall, holds that Congress cannot delegate law-making authority to other branches of government. Rehnquist offered three rationales for the application of the non-delegation doctrine. First, ensure Congress makes social policy, not agencies; delegation should only be used when the policy is highly technical or the ground too large to be covered. Second, agencies of the delegated authority require an “intelligible principle” to exercise discretion which was lacking in this case. Third, the intelligible principle must provide judges with a measuring stick for judicial review.

== Subsequent developments ==
Some scholars have said that the interpretation of the statute ignored a foundational principle of statutory interpretation, generalia specialibus non derogant ("the general does not derogate from the specific"). Generally, specific language governs general language. In this case, the court read the more general provision of Section 3(8) as governing the specific process specified in Section 6(b)(5).

The case also marks the current state of affairs for the non-delegation doctrine. When the court is faced with a provision that appears to be an impermissible delegation of the authority, it will use tools of statutory interpretation to try to narrow the delegation of power.
