= International Union of District 50, Allied and Technical Workers of the United States and Canada =

Labor Union (1933-1972)

The International Union of District 50, Allied and Technical Workers of the United States and Canada, was a labor union representing workers in the energy and chemical industries, and in uranium mining.

The union's origins lay in the foundation of the Massachusetts Council of Utility Workers by workers at the Everett Coke-Oven Plant in 1933. The union began representing workers in a variety of utilities, and in neighboring states, becoming the New England Council of Utility Workers in 1934, and the National Council of Gas and By-Product Coke Workers in 1935. In 1936, it affiliated to the United Mine Workers of America (UMW), which designated it as its District 50, lower numbers being reserved for geographical districts of coal miners. After several name changes, in 1941, it became District 50, United Mine Workers of America.

The district grew rapidly, and soon became larger than the remaining districts of the UMW put together. In 1961, it received organizational but not financial independence. This led it into disputes with the remainder of the UMW, particularly when it advocated for nuclear power plants. In March 1968, it was expelled from the UMW, adopting its final name in 1970. At this time, it had around 200,000 members, and was led by president Ellwood Moffett. On August 9, 1972, it merged into the United Steelworkers of America.
