= Lynn R. Williams =

Canadian trade unionist

5th President of the United Steelworkers
- In office 1983–1994
- Preceded by: Lloyd McBride
- Succeeded by: George Becker

Personal details
- Born: July 21, 1924 Springfield, Ontario
- Died: May 5, 2014 (aged 89) Toronto, Ontario
- Occupation: Labour leader

Lynn Russell Williams OC (July 21, 1924 – May 5, 2014) was a Canadian labour leader best remembered as the International President of the United Steelworkers union (USW) from 1983 until his retirement in 1994. Williams was the first Canadian to head a major North American industrial union.

== Biography ==
=== Early years ===
Lynn Russell Williams was born July 21, 1924, to a religious family in Springfield, Ontario, Canada. His father, Waldemar Williams, was a minister in the United Church of Canada, and his mother, Emma Elizabeth (née Fisher) Williams, a devout homemaker. One of three siblings, Williams was named by his parents after the 20th-century Methodist theologian Lynn Harold Hough.

Williams initially planned to follow in his father's footsteps by becoming a clergyman, but his goals changed during the Great Depression when the United Church of Canada moved his father to the industrial city of Hamilton, Ontario, where he was drawn into the trade union movement with a view to improving the lives of people on earth. He attended McMaster University in Hamilton, where he studied English and philosophy. It was during the course of his collegiate career that Williams became enamored with the idea of industrial democracy, worker participation in the decision-making process of production.

Williams served one year in the Royal Canadian Navy during World War II following completion of his undergraduate studies. Upon conclusion of the war and his discharge from the military, Williams enrolled in the graduate school of the University of Toronto, where he obtained a Master's degree in Economics and Industrial Relations.

=== Union career ===
Williams became a USW member in 1947 while employed by John Inglis and Company, Local 2900 in Toronto, Ontario. He became actively involved in the local activities of the union.

In 1956, Lynn was made part of the USW's professional staff. He was assigned as an organizer in District 6, based in Toronto and including much of Canada in its purview. In this capacity, Williams played a role in doubling the union's membership in the district over the subsequent decade. He also played a part in contract negotiations in the region.

Williams was a founding member of the New Democratic Party (NDP) in 1961, a socialist political organisation formed through the merger of the Co-operative Commonwealth Federation (CCF) and trade union activists from the Canadian Labour Congress. Williams later ran a campaign for parliament on the NDP ticket, but lost.

Williams was appointed assistant to the director of District 6 in 1965 and was himself elected director for the district in 1973. Williams' rise through the union ranks continued when in 1977 he was elected International Secretary of the USW — the number 2 post in the union's hierarchy behind International President Lloyd McBride. Following his election Williams moved to Pittsburgh with his family to take his place at union headquarters there.

=== USW President ===
Williams assumed the presidency following the unexpected death of Lloyd McBride in 1983.

He ran for office for the first time in his own right in March 1984 against USW Treasurer Frank McKee. The campaign was hard-fought and competitive, with McKee criticizing Williams for never having himself worked in a steel mill. This critique was not decisive, however, as less than a third of the USW's members were at that time workers in steel plants, with the majority working under USW contracts in other industries. Williams carried Canada handily and received substantial support from historically radical District 31 (Chicago) and District 15 (Upper Ohio Valley) in tallying 193,686 votes to his rival's 135,823.

At the time of his assumption of leadership of the USW, the union's membership had plummeted from 1.4 million members in 1979 to barely over 600,000 as a result of economic recession and deindustrialization. In an effort to stem the tide, Williams and the USW made a series of wage and benefit concessions to the struggling North American steel industry.

He later recalled of his first days as union chief: "If you can imagine an old mattress out in the junkyard with the springs popping up, I was like a guy lying on the springs trying to hold them all down. I didn't have enough body parts."

Williams was president of the union during the steel strike of 1986, a prolonged work stoppage which had devastating consequences for the North American steel industry.

During Williams's tenure as head of the USW the union moved from collective bargaining on an industry-wide basis to negotiations through smaller and more specific bargaining units. This structural change was accompanied by an increased emphasis on profit-sharing and job security as the union's objectives in negotiations.

Williams and the USW's trading of wages and benefits for stock ownership, seats on company boards, and leveraging of employee stock holdings against hostile takeover attempts is credited with saving 25 North American steel plants from closure between 1985 and 1993.

=== Later years ===
Williams retired at the end of his term in 1994 and moved back home to Toronto. Even in retirement, Williams remained politically active as a leading force behind the establishment of Steelworkers’ Organization of Active Retirees (SOAR), advancing causes related to social and labour related causes. Williams was himself elected president of that organization.

In recognition of his service as a leader of the organised labour movement, Lynn Williams was appointed an officer of the Order of Canada in 2005. Williams was further honoured when the city of Toronto dedicated and named a street after him in May 2007.

In 2011 Williams saw the publication of his memoir, One Day Longer, by the University of Toronto Press. In it he explained the significance of the book's title:

In the North American labour movement, workers on strike frequently use the slogan "One Day Longer" to emphasize their determination to hold out as long as it takes in order to have their demands met, as well as their conviction that change is indeed possible. The spirit underlying that slogan, with its combination of commitment and optimism, is also at the heart of this book. My entire career in the trade-union movement was based on the belief that, in the face of serious obstacles, workers, whether on strike or not, needed to remain united and committed over the long haul. If they did, they would be in a strong position to achieve their collective-bargaining goals and to realize the broader objective of creating a more just and democratic society. I hold the same conviction today.

=== Death and legacy ===
Lynn R. Williams died in Toronto on May 5, 2014, at the age of 89. He was survived by two daughters, two sons, and 11 grandchildren, his wife of 34 years having preceded him in death in 2000.

Williams is remembered as the first person to have served on both the Executive of the Canadian Labour Congress (CLC) and the American Federation of Labor and Congress of Industrial Organizations (AFL-CIO), although these positions were not served concurrently.

== Works ==
- Lynn R. Williams, One Day Longer: A Memoir. Toronto, ON: University of Toronto Press, 2011.

Trade union offices
Preceded by Lloyd McBride	President of the United Steelworkers; 1983 - 1994	Succeeded by George Becker
Preceded by Patrick J. Campbell	AFL-CIO delegate to the Trades Union Congress; 1985	Succeeded by Jack Joyce
