= Lloyd McBride =

American labor leader (1916–1983)

4th President of the United Steelworkers
- In office 1977–1983
- Preceded by: Iorwith Wilbur Abel
- Succeeded by: Lynn R. Williams

Personal details
- Born: March 16, 1916 Farmington, Missouri
- Died: November 6, 1983 (aged 67) Whitehall, Pennsylvania
- Occupation: Labor leader

Lloyd McBride (March 16, 1916 – November 6, 1983) was an American labor leader and president of the United Steelworkers of America from 1977 to 1983. He was on President Jimmy Carter's commission chaired by John G. Kemeny, President of Dartmouth College, to investigate the Three Mile Island Nuclear Accident in October of 1979.

== Early life and union work ==
McBride was born in Farmington, Missouri, in 1916. His father was a painter at a St. Louis steel fabricating mill. When he was 14 years old, he quit school to support his family at a 25-cents-an-hour job in the same plant.

In 1936, he became a member of Steel Workers Organizing Committee Local 1295. The local struck in 1937. McBride organized a sitdown strike which was broken by police after only seven days. The broader strike continued for seven more weeks, and the workers were successful in winning a contract on their terms. McBride was elected president of his local by acclamation afterward.

McBride married Delores Neihaus in 1937. They had a son and a daughter.

McBride was elected president of the St. Louis Industrial Union Council in 1940, and president of the CIO Council for Missouri in 1942.

McBride served in the United States Navy from 1943 to 1945.

After World War II, McBride returned to Missouri and his union position. In 1958, the Steelworkers hired him to be director of the USW Sub-District based in Granite City, Illinois. In 1965, he was elected director of District 34.

== USW presidency ==
McBride became a protégé of I.W. Abel, the Steelworker president.

In 1977, Abel retired and McBride ran for the union presidency. McBride's opponent was Edward Sadlowski, the young president of USW District 31. Sadlowski contended that McBride was too close to employers and not in touch with steelworkers. The campaign was a bitter one. McBride received the support of Abel and AFL-CIO president George Meany, while Sadlowski won the backing of Ralph Nader, Victor Reuther, John Kenneth Galbraith and General Motors heir Stewart Rawlings Mott. McBride filed a lawsuit alleging that Sadlowski had received illegal campaign contributions, and Sadlowski filed a libel suit against McBride.The suit against Sadlowski established that more than 90% of the contributions received by Sadlowski came from outside the union, including the President of the Strite Rite Company and the General Counsel of Nissan Steel (Stride Rite had a long record of violations of labor law). The discovery of the extent of the outside involvement was broadcast to the membership and had a profound effect on the election. McBride went so far as to imply that Sadlowski was a communist: "I don't really know whether he is or isn't a Communist. But I do know he's in bed with left-wingers," McBride told supporters. Sadlowski had the support of the Communist Party and the Socialist Workers Party. They, and other prominent liberal supporters joined the campaign to send a message to George Meany to stop supporting the Vietnam war. The union, after the election, established a rule prohibiting outside contributions to candidates which was challenged and decided in the union's favor by the United States Supreme Court.

In the end, McBride defeated Sadlowski 3-to-2 (328,000 to 249,000).

McBride strongly supported the Experimental Negotiations Agreement (ENA), a contract negotiated with steelmakers by President Abel which included a provision preventing the union from striking over economic terms—whether the contract was in force or had expired. However, high inflation drove wages much higher under the ENA, and steelmakers unilaterally canceled the agreement (as was their right) as the 1980 contract talks approached.

McBride was unable to negotiate strong national contracts for his members. He had a difficult time convincing steelworkers that the contracts reaches were the best he could achieve, and restive union members twice rejected contracts in 1983. Under McBride, the union agreed to cut wages and benefits for the first time since 1936. The average wage of $14.33 an hour was cut 8.7 percent in the first year, although a provision in the 1983 contract would restore that cut over the term of the 41-month agreement. He did not participate in the negotiations for either the 1980 or 1983 contract renewals.

McBride also presided over the union at a time of greatly diminishing membership. During his presidency, the Steelworkers lost nearly half its 1.4 million members due to offshoring and plant closings. McBride was a moderate who successfully resisted members' calls for militancy in the face of widespread steel industry unemployment and sharply increased pressure on wages and benefits. He also refused to collude with employers and implement a "business unionism" policy in order to secure high wages and job security for a limited number of members.

McBride had a history of heart disease. He was hospitalized three times from 1980 to 1983 for heart disease. A pacemaker was installed in February 1983. McBride underwent heart bypass surgery in Pittsburgh, Pennsylvania, on October 18, 1983. He was discharged from the hospital on November 1, and died in his sleep in the night of November 5 or early on November 6 at his home in Whitehall, Pennsylvania.

== Notes ==
Trade union offices
Preceded by I.W. Abel	President of the United Steelworkers; 1977 - 1983	Succeeded by Lynn R. Williams
