= 1986 USX steel strike =

1986 USX Steel Strike
- Part of Labor Unions
- Date: August 1, 1986 – January 31, 1987 (40 years ago)
- Location: United States

Parties
United Steelworkers of America	Steel Industry

Number
22,000	

About 22,000 employees of major American steel manufacturer USX stopped work from August 1, 1986 to January 31, 1987 after the United Steelworkers of America and the company failed to agree on new employee contract terms. The event was characterized by the company as a strike and by the union as a lockout. It surpassed the steel strike of 1959 as the longest steel industry work stoppage in US history.

The stoppage resulted in most USX facilities becoming idle until February 1, 1987, seriously degrading the steel division's market share. A compromise was brokered and accepted by the union membership on January 31, 1987.

== Background ==
The United States steel industry had been in decline since the late 1970s. Unions blamed management for underinvestment in capital improvements, and management blamed unions for demanding exorbitant pay, benefits, and strict limits on non-union subcontracting.

A previous collective bargaining agreement expired at the end of July 1986. The union and management were unable to agree on terms, and over 99% of the USWA membership voted to go on strike when the current contract expired.

== Work stoppage ==
The USW delivered a letter to USX on July 31, one day before the contract expired, offering to continue work under the terms of the previous contract until a deal could be reached if the union maintained the right to go on strike at any time with 48 hours' notice. USX rejected the offer, as it had already begun lengthy and expensive plant shutdown procedures in anticipation of a strike; furthermore, the ability to stop work on two days' notice would have given the union the ability to cost USX even more money, by disrupting deliveries and requiring another expensive and unplanned plant-idling operation. USX maintained that the offer was never meant to be taken seriously and was a "legal fiction," designed to permit striking workers to collect unemployment benefits, as most US states allowed payment of unemployment during a management lockout but not a worker-initiated strike.

Negotiations were at an impasse, and most USX facilities remained idle for months. Management-level employees began loading trucks and trains with previously-produced steel kept in inventory themselves and shipping it to customers, which led to violent clashes with striking workers.

Corporate raider Carl Icahn announced his intention to take over USX on October 6, 1986 by friendly means if possible or by hostile means if necessary. He began separate negotiations with both the union and management, increasing the pressure on both sides to come to an agreement. Icahn discussed various potential concessions that he might agree to with union leadership.

Management feared that an Icahn deal with the union would leads losing control of the company. The union remained publicly neutral but internally came to believe that Icahn merely wanted to extract short-term cash from USX and was not really interested in the long-term health of the steel industry.

Management and the union resumed direct negotiations on October 21, 1986, but talks had broken down by November 21.

== Return to work ==
By January 1987, USX was about to miss major orders for car manufacturers, and union members had reached the end of their unemployment benefits. The sides agreed to a compromise in which unions received their desired restrictions on subcontracting and expanded early retirement benefits, and management received wage concessions and the elimination of about 1,300 union jobs. The union members voted to accept the proposed agreement on January 31, 1987. Both sides claimed victory.

On February 4, 1987, three days after the agreement had been reached to end the work stoppage, USX announced that four USX plants would remain closed permanently, eliminating about 3,500 union jobs. At a press conference, USX declared that the plants had been closed since December 31 and were not included in the agreement. However, union members were unaware of that fact when they had voted to accept the deal and would surely have voted otherwise if they had known.

== See also ==
- 1952 steel strike
- Steel strike of 1959
