= Workers Uniting =

Trans-Atlantic trade union

The organisation's logo

Workers Uniting is a trans-Atlantic trade union created in 2008 by a merger of Unite the Union (better known as Unite) of the United Kingdom and Ireland with the North American United Steelworkers union (USW) based in the United States. Both unions still retain individual branding and leadership.

The merged union has a membership of three million members.

== Politics ==
Workers Uniting opposed the proposed Comprehensive Economic and Trade Agreement between the European Union and Canada.
