= United Steelworkers =

Industrial labor union in North America

- United Steel, Paper and Forestry, Rubber, Manufacturing, Energy, Allied Industrial and Service Workers International Union
- Abbreviation: USW
- Predecessor: Amalgamated Association of Iron and Steel Workers
- Formation: May 22, 1942; 84 years ago
- Type: Trade union
- Headquarters: United Steelworkers Building, Pittsburgh, Pennsylvania, US
- Locations: Aruba; Canada; United States
- Members: 527,373 (2024)
- President: Roxanne Brown
- Affiliations: AFL–CIO; Canadian Labour Congress; New Democratic Party; Workers Uniting
- Website: usw.org
- Formerly called: United Steel Workers of America

The United Steel, Paper and Forestry, Rubber, Manufacturing, Energy, Allied Industrial and Service Workers International Union, commonly known as the United Steelworkers (USW), is a general trade union with members across North America. Headquartered in Pittsburgh, the United Steelworkers represents workers in Canada, the Caribbean, and the United States. The United Steelworkers represent workers in a diverse range of industries, including its original home in metals, as well as paper, chemicals, glass, rubber, heavy-duty conveyor belting, tires, transportation, utilities, container industries, pharmaceuticals, call centers, museums, health care, and higher education.

The United Steelworkers is currently affiliated with the AFL–CIO in the United States and the Canadian Labour Congress (CLC) in Canada as well as several international union federations. On July 2, 2008, the United Steelworkers signed an agreement to merge with the United Kingdom and Ireland–based union Unite to form a new global union entity called Workers Uniting.

As of 2026, the International President of the United Steelworkers is Roxanne D. Brown, who was installed as president on March 1, 2026, succeeding David McCall.

Rank-and-file members, as well as representatives, of the United Steelworkers refer to themselves, and are most often referred to, as Steelworkers. The use of the capitalized single word Steelworker or Steelworkers, as opposed to the lowercase two-worded steel worker or steel workers, is also an identifier of those who are part of, or affiliated with, the United Steelworkers International Union rather than being general non-union workers within the steel industry. This distinction is important in North America wherein a vast majority of the steel industry is unionized. For example, some of the most recognizable and largest companies in the business such as United States Steel (USS) and Cleveland-Cliffs, with their combined hourly workforces at facilities in North America being Steelworkers and represented by the USW, including the largest facilities on the continent, like US Steel's Gary Works in Gary, Indiana, Cleveland-Cliffs's Burns Harbor in Burns Harbor, Indiana, Indiana Harbor East and West in Northwest Indiana, and Cleveland Plant in Cleveland, Ohio, all of which are situated on the Great Lakes freshwater system. On the other hand, some steel companies, usually at facilities known as "mini-mills", like Nucor Steel and its facility in Crawfordsville, Indiana, are non-union shops not represented by the United Steelworkers.

== Origins and history ==
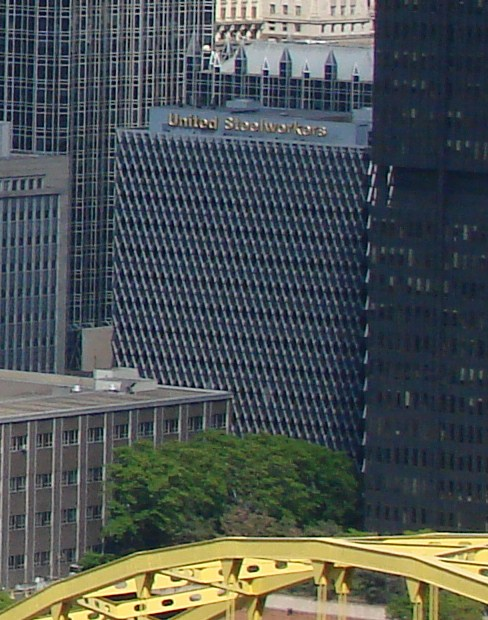
Headquarters in Pittsburgh: Five Gateway Center

The USW was established May 22, 1942, in Cleveland, Ohio, through the Congress of Industrial Organizations (CIO) by a convention of representatives from the Amalgamated Association of Iron, Steel, and Tin Workers and the Steel Workers Organizing Committee, after almost six years of divisive struggles to create a new union of steelworkers. The drive to create this union included such violent incidents as the infamous Memorial Day, 1937, when Chicago policemen supporting the rival American Federation of Labor (AFL) fired on workers outside a Republic Steel mill and killed 10 men.

The founder and first president of the USW, Philip Murray, led the union through its first organizing drives and its first decade, when the workers of USW went on strike several times to win the right to bargain collectively with steel companies.

Significant job actions of the USW include:

- 1946 US Steel Strike
- 1952 steel strike
- Steel strike of 1959
- 1974 Elliot Lake miners strike
- Steel strike of 1986

== Growth of the union ==
Membership (US records)
View chart definition.

Finances (US records; ×$1m)
View chart definition.

The 46,000 members of the Aluminum Workers of America voted to merge with the budding steelworker union that was the USW in June 1944. Eventually, eight more unions joined the USW as well: the International Union of Mine, Mill and Smelter Workers (1967); the United Stone and Allied Product Workers of America (1971); International Union of District 50, Allied and Technical Workers of the United States and Canada (1972); the Upholsterers International Union of North America (1985); the United Rubber, Cork, Linoleum and Plastic Workers of America (URW) (1995); the Aluminum, Brick and Glass Workers Union (ABG) (1996); the Canadian Division of the Transportation Communications International Union (1999); and the American Flint Glass Workers' Union (AFGWU) (2003).

In June 2004, the USW announced a merger with the 57,000 member Industrial, Wood and Allied Workers of Canada (IWA Canada), a major Canadian forestry workers union. In 2005 it then announced an even larger merger with the Paper, Allied-Industrial, Chemical and Energy Workers International Union (PACE). The resulting new union adopted its current name after the PACE merger.

In September 2006, the Independent Oil Workers Union of Aruba, which represents refinery workers on the Caribbean island of Aruba, affiliated with the United Steelworkers, becoming the first USW union local outside of the US (including Puerto Rico and the US Virgin Islands) and Canada.

In April 2007, the USW also merged with the Independent Steelworkers Union, adding 1,150 members at ArcelorMittal's Weirton, West Virginia steel mill.

On Jan. 1, 2015, the Telecommunications Workers Union (TWU) merged with the United Steelworkers and continued as USW Local 1944. The Local number commemorates the TWU's founding on Sept. 1, 1944.

== Strategic alliances ==
In addition to mergers, the USW has also formed strategic alliances with several other unions as well as other groups. In April 2005, the USW and the Alliance of Canadian Cinema, Television and Radio Artists (ACTRA) announced that they had formed a strategic alliance to take on the globalization of the culture industry and to address a range of common issues. In July 2006, the USW announced a similar arrangement with the United Transportation Union (UTU), to address common issues in the transportation industry, including the globalization of the industry. In July 2007, the USW inked yet another strategic alliance with the Canadian Region of the Communications Workers of America.

Beyond its affiliations with other unions, in June 2006, the USW announced the formation of a 'Blue-Green Alliance' with the Sierra Club, with the goal of pursuing a joint public policy agenda.

In October 2009, the USW announced a framework for collaboration between US and Canadian Steelworkers with Mondragon Internacional, S.A., the world's largest federation of worker cooperatives.

== 2008 transoceanic merger ==
In April 2007, Amicus, then the United Kingdom's second-largest trade union, began discussions with the USW about a possible merger. Amicus subsequently merged with the British Transport and General Workers Union to form the new union Unite. Unite and the USW continued the merger talks initiated by Amicus.

In May 2008, the unions announced that they were putting the "finishing touches" on the merger, that the merger had been endorsed by Unite officials, and that the USW would discuss the plan at its forthcoming convention in July. Once completed, the new merged entity would represent more than 3 million workers in the United States, the United Kingdom, Canada, Ireland and the Caribbean. The unions have further announced that the new entity would target further mergers with labor groups in Australia and in the emerging economies of Asia, Latin America and Eastern Europe. On July 2, 2008, USW and Unite leadership formally signed the merger agreement to create the new entity, to be called Workers Uniting.

== American politics ==
In the 2006 election, the USW led a political mobilization program that eventually grew to include 350 full-time political organizers in 26 states, a majority of whom were rank and file USW members who took time from work to organize their communities and educate fellow union members. The USW turned out some 5,000 USW volunteers on Election Day, including over 1,000 each in the key states of Pennsylvania and Ohio. Exit polls suggested union families made up 23 percent of the total vote and supported Democratic candidates by a substantial 32 percent margin, 65 percent to 33 percent. Based on these numbers, the United Steelworkers, in conjunction with the rest of the labor movement, took substantial credit for the eventual Democratic victory.

The USW endorsed Barack Obama's presidential campaign and re-election, Hillary Clinton's presidential campaign, and Joe Biden's presidential campaign.

In 2023 and 2024, USW expressed opposition to the proposed acquisition of U.S. Steel by Japanese steel company Nippon Steel. USW International President David McCall stated in March 2024 that “Allowing one of our nation’s largest steel manufacturers to be purchased by a foreign-owned corporation leaves us vulnerable when it comes to meeting both our defense and critical infrastructure needs.”

== Canadian politics ==
The United Steelworkers was a founding partner of the New Democratic Party and continues to be an affiliated union.

In 2025, the United Steelworkers, alongside founding partners Unifor and the Canadian Union of Public Employees, CUPE, formed the Canadian Telecommunications Workers Alliance (CTWA), a non-partisan resource bench dedicated to ensuring that elected officials, regulators and policymakers had access to the voice, experience, and expertise of Canada's telecommunications workforce when developing legislation and public policy.

== Philanthropy ==
The USW has contributed to various charitable and philanthropic causes since its creation. The USW has enthusiastically supported The Institutes for the Achievement of Human Potential (IAHP), a nonprofit organization that works with brain-injured children. The USW has hosted the IAHP's founder, Glenn Doman, at their annual convention. The USW has also held fundraising events for the Make-A-Wish Foundation and Roswell Park Comprehensive Cancer Center. The USW has consistently stated that such charitable causes are important to its mission.

== Presidents ==
The presidents of the United Steelworkers are:

- Philip Murray, 1942–1952
- David J. McDonald, 1952–1965
- I. W. Abel, 1965–1977
- Lloyd McBride, 1977–1983
- Lynn R. Williams, 1983–1994
- George Becker, 1994–2001
- Leo Gerard, 2001–2019
- Tom Conway, 2019–2023
- David McCall, 2023–2026
- Roxanne Brown, 2026–present

== See also ==
- Arthur Goldberg, general counsel of the USW and later a US Supreme Court associate justice
- Bernard Kleiman, general counsel of USW from 1965 to 1997
