= Emil Rieve =

American labor leader

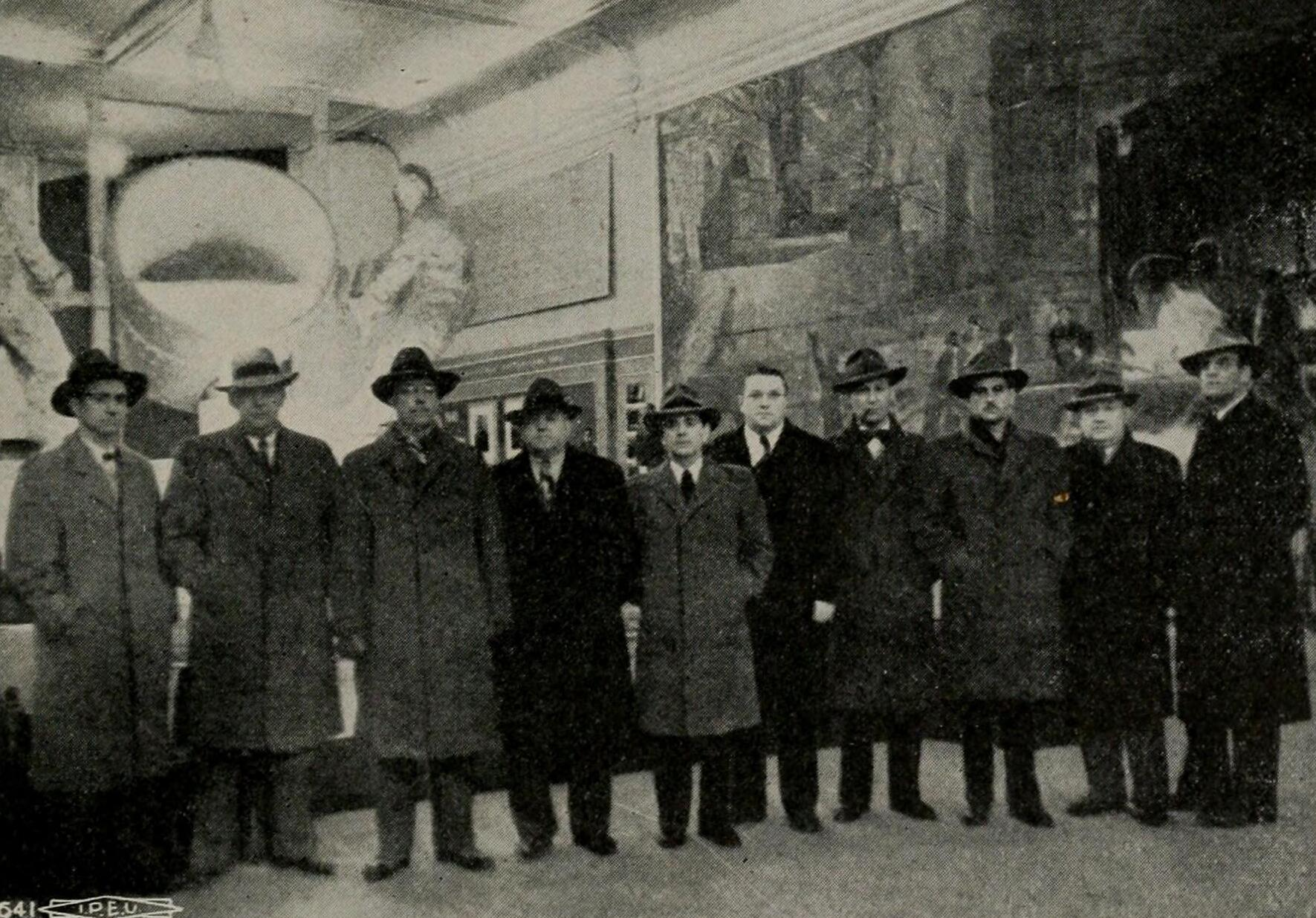
Rieve (second from right) and other members of a CIO delegation to the Soviet Union, 1945

Emil Rieve (June 8, 1892 – January 24, 1975) was an American labor leader. He was president of the Textile Workers Union of America (TWUA) from 1939 to 1956, a vice president of the Congress of Industrial Organizations (CIO) from 1939 to 1955, and a vice president of the AFL-CIO from 1955 to 1960.

Emil Rieve was born in Poland and moved to Pennsylvania as a child. He left school early and first became a union member at age fifteen, quickly rising within the union hierarchy. He organized his first strike in 1930 in Reading, Pennsylvania. His aggressive drives to unionize the region's textile workers and achieve union recognition led to the Reading Formula of 1933 in negotiating with the National Labor Board, a precedent which resolved large numbers of other labor disputes. Rieve was a major figure in the unsuccessful textile workers strike of 1934. When the Congress of Industrial Organizations formed the following year, Rieve received international recognition for his efforts to avoid a rift with the American Federation of Labor.

In 1937 Rieve pioneered a successful sit-down strike of 50,000 textile workers that resulted in wage increases. He became acting chairman of the Textile Workers Organizing Committee in 1938 and organized the Textile Workers Union of America in 1939. The union was quite strong under Rieve's stewardship and he played a role in the merger of the AFL with the CIO in 1952.

== Early life ==
Rieve was born in Żyrardów County in Congress Poland in 1892 to Fred and Pauline (née Lange) Rieve. The family was Lutheran, and Fred Rieve was a machinist who tended textile machines.

Rieve attended a local elementary school. But the family emigrated to the United States in 1904, interrupting Rieve's education. The Rieves settled in central Pennsylvania, and Emil found work in a hosiery mill. He married Laura Wosnack in July 1916. They had a son, Harold.

== Early union career ==
In 1907, at the age of 15, Rieve joined the American Federation of Hosiery Workers (AFHW), a semi-autonomous division of the United Textile Workers of America (UTW), an affiliate of the American Federation of Labor. His rise in the union was meteoric: At the age of 22, he was elected a vice president of the AFHW, became the division's president in 1929 at the age of 35, and joined the national UTW executive board in 1934.

=== Organizing and the Reading Formula ===
Rieve was committed to organizing new members in the hosiery industry. In November 1930, Rieve authorized a strike among hosiery workers in the mills around Reading, Pennsylvania. The strike collapsed after heavy employer opposition. Rieve then tried a new tactic: The union agreed to a 30 percent wage cut in the expectation that non-union mills would lower their wages below the new union level. This would trigger a massive strike, enabling the AFHW to move in and organize the workers. Roughly 3,000 workers, or about a third of the total number in the industry, struck. Rieve purposefully withheld strike aid to the workers in an attempt to increase the radicalism of the workers and raise the demand for a union. But employers were content to idle plants in the depths of the Great Depression, and the strike lingered for nearly a year. Admitting defeat, Rieve signed a new contract in September 1932.

Just three months later, Rieve led his division in approving yet another large organizing drive. Again aimed at workers in the Reading area, Rieve declared war "against industrial slavery [and] starvation wages". The organizing drive began in the summer of 1933. The employers refused to recognize the union, and 10,000 workers went on strike. On August 10, 1933, the National Labor Board mediated a settlement which established the "Reading formula." The "Reading formula" was a major step forward in the conceptualization of American labor law, for it established the principle of secret-ballot elections as a means of determining union support among workers at a plant.

=== 1934 national textile strike ===
By 1934, despite Rieve's organizing drive and conditions favorable to union organizing created by the depression, the UTW still had only 80,000 paying members (making it one of the smaller unions in the AFL).

The National Industrial Recovery Act (NIRA) of 1933 had authorized the establishment of "industry codes" to regulate wages, hours and working conditions in every industry in the United States. But employers not only heavily influenced the writing of the code, they also dominated the board adjudicating alleged violations of the code. The code led to few improvements in the textile industry. For example, when workers won shorter hours, employers made an end-run around the restriction by speeding up work.

Newly elected to the UTW executive board, Rieve was one of several national union leaders who pressed for the union to threaten a nationwide strike in order to win improvements in the NIRA code. The strike was a mere threat, as UTW had no resources to undertake a nationwide strike. Nevertheless, the National Recovery Administration agreed to provide UTW leaders with a voice on the code adjudicatory board. UTW agreed to cancel the strike.

Local UTW leaders, however, refused to call off the strike. Locals in northern Alabama struck on July 18, and the strike swept through the Deep South. UTW was forced to call a special convention on August 13 to address the crisis. The UTW drew up a list of demands, which mill owners ignored. Nevertheless, the strike enjoyed initial success. In many counties, 80 percent of workers walked out. Nationwide, almost 400,000 textile workers left their jobs, an astonishing number in the middle of the depression.

Mill owners and state and local government officials worked together to put down the strike. State and local officials hired hundreds of "special deputies" to guard plants, prevent strikers from closing plants, protect replacement workers from harassment and intimidation, and (in some cases) to beat strikers and break up picket lines. The governors of Connecticut, Maine, North Carolina, Rhode Island and South Carolina ordered out the National Guard. The governors of Georgia and Rhode Island also declared martial law. In Georgia, the governor ordered the arrest of all picketers and held hundreds in a former World War I prisoner of war camp.

Violence also broke out. Three picketers and mill guard were shot to death in Georgia. Six picketers were killed and more than 20 wounded in South Carolina. A picketer was murdered in Rhode Island when National Guardsmen fired into a crowd attempting to storm a rayon knitting mill.

After a mere 22 days, the strike was over. President Franklin D. Roosevelt had established a mediation board in the first week of the strike. The board recommended further study, that workers return to work, and that employers rehire workers without discriminating against strikers. With the UTW able to provide staff, financial resources and strike benefits in only a few places and for a small number of workers, the strike collapsed. Employees attempted to return to work, but mill owners refused to rehire the strikers. Although the 1934 textile strike was a major defeat for Rieve and the UTW, the union did sign up thousands of new members and declared victory nonetheless.

=== Other activities ===
Rieve was also active in politics. In 1932, he led a successful push to get the UTW to call for the establishment of a new political party beholden solely to the labor movement. A socialist, Rieve resigned his membership in the Socialist Party of America and supported the new American Labor Party.

Rieve also was a committed industrial unionist. The UTW itself was an amalgamated union, a form of industrial union. Rieve's experiences in attempting to organize new members had convinced him that industrial unionism was the key to building the labor movement. In 1934, Rieve convinced UTW delegates to approve a resolution supporting industrial unionism. This philosophical commitment would prove to be pivotal in Rieve's life.

== Textile Workers Organizing Committee ==
In 1935, the American labor movement split over the question of craft versus industrial unionism. The Committee for Industrial Organization (CIO) formed on November 9, 1935, and UTW president Thomas McMahon was one of the Committee's charter members.

Rieve and McMahon refused to surrender their principles. The two leaders secured passage in December 1935 of a UTW executive council resolution supporting the CIO. In July 1936, Rieve and McMahon gained additional support when the UTW convention approved the formation of the CIO and the UTW's membership in the organization. The AFL executive council "tried" the members of the CIO from July 8 to July 15, 1936, and expelled the UTW and the other CIO member unions on September 5.

Rieve, however, continued to hold out an olive branch to the AFL. In September 1936, he won AFHW support for a resolution asking the AFL to reconsider the expulsion of the CIO unions. Rieve was unable to organize many new members. Despite meetings with John Brophy, the CIO's organizing director, the CIO did not consider any major organizing effort in textiles. The UTW's finances were in such poor shape that the union actually cut the number of staff organizers by 20 percent. And despite conditions conducive to organizing, the union established only nine new locals between September 1936 and February 1937. Nevertheless, Rieve became known internationally for his efforts, and was appointed to the national committee of the International Labour Organization.

=== Collective bargaining ===
For most of the next three years, Rieve attempted to fend off a series of attacks on the division's collective bargaining agreements. About a third of the UTW's membership came from the hosiery division in early 1937, and Rieve was in many ways the UTW's true leader. In the spring of 1937, Rieve led 15,000 Pennsylvania hosiery workers out on strike for a new contract. Pioneering use of the sit-down strike, the strikers successfully closed the mills. The strike's success spread until more than 50,000 union workers were on strike. Rieve eventually signed an agreement giving workers wage increases of 8 to 10 percent.

In early 1938, however, Rieve was forced to act against his own union members. The recession of 1937 had led to a significant worsening of economic conditions. Union members in Philadelphia demanded a pay increase. Rieve argued that the union had only managed to stop a wage giveback; there was no possibility of securing a wage increase. Nevertheless, workers at more than 50 hosiery plants in the Philadelphia area struck on March 1, 1938. Rieve declared the strike to be "illegal" and actively supported employer and government efforts to end the job action. When the new union contract was signed in mid-July, Rieve and the AFHW had successfully resisted employer demands to cut wages but were forced to agree to a contract clause barring strikes and lockouts for the term of the three-year agreement. Rieve rose to national prominence through his astute leadership of the AFHW. After passage of the Fair Labor Standards Act in June 1938, Rieve was appointed to a federal committee to determine minimum wages in the textile industry.

=== Formation and leadership of TWOC ===
In February 1937, McMahon resigned the presidency of UTW to take a state government job in Rhode Island. He was succeeded by Francis J. Gorman. Meanwhile, the CIO had achieved sudden and large organizing victories in steel, automobile manufacturing and the rubber industry. The organizing victory in steel had come after the CIO had co-opted the Amalgamated Association of Iron and Steel Workers (the AA), using the long-established but moribund union as a means of legitimizing the CIO's efforts in organizing the steel industry. CIO leaders had forced the AA to become part of a new, centrally-run, and efficient organizing project, the Steel Workers Organizing Committee (SWOC).

CIO leaders had little confidence in Gorman or the UTW. Gorman had overseen the ill-fated 1934 textile strike. The UTW staff was considered incompetent, and politically behold to McMahon's relatively conservative policies. Rieve coveted the presidency of UTW, and worked to undercut Gorman at every turn—even when that meant disagreeing with actions he himself would otherwise support. Worst of all, UTW was practically bankrupt. Only the hosiery and dyers divisions were self-supporting, and Gorman was actually seeking a $5,000 loan from the CIO to keep the national union afloat.

From a strategic perspective, UTW was ill-equipped to organize in textiles. Although there were more than 1 million workers in the industry, "textiles" was actually more than 10 distinct industries. Each had its own markets, technology, and labor force. Workers rarely moved between segments of the industry, for their skills were not normally transferable. More than 6,000 textile firms existed, almost none of them strategic. The geographic spread of the industry encompassed 29 states, with nearly 75 percent of all textile employment in the virulently anti-union Deep South.

But Sidney Hillman, president of the Amalgamated Clothing Workers of America and a CIO vice president, was adamant that the CIO undertake a comprehensive organizing drive in textiles. Now, two years after the victories in steel and automobiles, Hillman pressured CIO leaders to force the UTW into an agreement similar to that which had created SWOC. On May 9, 1937, the Textile Workers Organizing Committee (TWOC) was formed. Hillman was named the chairman, and Thomas Kennedy of the United Mine Workers its secretary-treasurer. The committee's other five members included Gorman and Rieve.

TWOC organized impressive numbers of workers in its first six months. By September 1937, TWOC had organized 215,000 workers, most of them in the Northeast. But the recession of 1937 led to layoffs and sharp drops in TWOC membership. Additionally, Hillman fell critically ill in October 1937. He did not return to the committee's leadership until April 1938, and Rieve (not Thomas) was named the committee's acting chairman. Meanwhile, TWOC opened its organizing drive in the Deep South, but its efforts against the "fortress of southern cotton" proved fruitless. By the spring of 1939, after 18 months of work, TWOC could count only 27,000 Southern members—less than 7 percent of the region's textile workers.

== Formation of TWUA ==
Rieve's tenure as acting chairman saw the beginning of events which would seriously affect the union in the 1950s. The first was Rieve's ejection of the New Bedford Textile Council. The council, a federation of seven textile unions in New Bedford, Massachusetts, had been confronted by an employer demand in January 1938 to cut wages by 12.5 percent. Rather than stay silent and acquiesce in the wage cut, the council formally approved the wage reduction. The action not only angered other New England locals, but undercut TWOC organizing efforts in the region. Determined to uphold the authority of TWOC and concerned that the council's action might spark a revolt by other New England local unions, Rieve revoked the charters of the seven locals.

In late 1938, TWOC also saw a revolt from within. Hillman distrusted Gorman, and clearly favored Rieve as the leader of the union which would emerge once TWOC's organizing drives concluded. Gorman and other disgruntled UTW leaders filed suit against TWOC, claiming that UTW funds had been illegally appropriated by TWOC. A Rhode Island superior court ruled on November 30, 1938, that the TWOC-UTW agreement of March 9 was invalid. Gorman then denounced TWOC and Hillman, and sought to re-affiliate UTW with the AFL. On December 28, 1938, Gorman led a convention of 21 delegates in voting for affiliation with the AFL. The AFL executive council approve the affiliation on February 3, 1939.

Hillman and the TWOC leadership branded Gorman a traitor and replaced him with George Baldanzi, president of the UTW's dyers division.

Realizing that the March 9 agreement might not survive court scrutiny, Hillman, Rieve and Baldanzi called a convention of UTW and TWOC locals for May 15, 1939. The convention voted to merge the two organizations into a new union, the Textile Workers Union of America (TWUA). Rieve was elected president, and Baldanzi vice president. Both elections were unanimous.

== TWUA presidency ==
Emil Rieve's tenure as president of the TWUA saw the union's prestige and importance soar during World War II and falter in the 1950s. The union's decline in the 1960s finally led Rieve to retire. Rieve was elected a vice president of the CIO in 1939 after his election as TWUA president.

In 1940, Rieve established a Southern organizing committee and pushed the union deeper into politics. With himself as the head of the organizing project, the union organized Marshall Field's, Lane Cotton and the Erwin Cotton Mills—the latter the first of the "big four" North Carolina cotton mills to be organized. Rieve also kept the union politically active, making the TWUA one of the first labor organizations to endorse Franklin D. Roosevelt for president for reelection in 1940.

But in May 1941, the New Bedford Textile Council affiliated with the AFL's UTW, providing the rump union with a significant boost. Soon the UTW had defeated the TWUA in elections in Massachusetts and Tennessee, and was beginning to challenge the TWUA in the Northeast.

In March 1941, President Roosevelt created the National Defense Mediation Board, and appointed Rieve as an alternative labor representative. The board had been created to help resolve collective bargaining disputes in defense production, transportation and raw materials industries. The United Mine Workers were fighting for the closed shop when the board's public and employer representatives voted that the issue should be submitted to binding arbitration. Angry that the board would not order the mine owners to submit to the closed shop, Rieve and the other CIO members of the board resigned. After the attack on Pearl Harbor, however, the president established the War Labor Board on January 12, 1942, to arbitrate labor disputes and wage settlements. Rieve was appointed as an alternate to the board and served throughout the war. But Rieve and other labor representatives left the body in early 1945 after the public and employer members of the board refused to approve sizeable post-war wage increases for union members. Rieve released the TWUA from its wartime no-strike pledge shortly thereafter.

Although Rieve had purged his union of communists in the mid-1930s, he found himself accused of communist dictatorship in 1944. American Labor Party (ALP) leader Sidney Hillman felt that the 1944 presidential election would be a close one in New York state. Hillman proposed that communists be permitted to play a role in the party, hoping to tip the state toward Roosevelt. ALP leader David Dubinsky felt the communists should be expelled from the ALP. Rieve supported Hillman. Rieve was labeled a communist, and Samuel Baron (the general manager of the TWUA) resigned in protest from the union. Nevertheless, Hillman's proposal won the approval of ALP delegates, and Roosevelt easily carried New York in the general election.

In 1945, Rieve was a member of a CIO delegation to the Soviet Union. He was an ardent anti-communist, however, and strongly criticized the Soviet Union afterward. Two years later, Rieve became one of the first CIO leaders to sign the non-communist oath required by the Taft-Hartley Act.

=== Secession movement ===
In 1948, Rieve expelled his old division, the American Federation of Hosiery Workers, from the TWUA. The division, which had 20,000 members, was a major backer of TWUA executive vice-president George Baldanzi. Baldanzi was strongly critical of Rieve's leadership of the union, and argued that Rieve was not doing enough to organize new members or win contract improvements. When the Hosiery Workers withheld dues in protest of the Rieve administration's policies, Rieve pulled the division's charter.

The tension between Rieve and Baldanzi worsened over the next two years. In May 1950, Rieve attempted to unseat Baldanzi as executive vice-president. Baldanzi, however, beat back the attempt and retained his seat. Rieve then tried to amend the TWUA constitution to remove the executive vice-president from the line of succession if the president should fall ill or die. This attempt, too, was defeated.

Rieve fired Samuel Baron, a Baldanzi supporter and the regional director of the TWUA in Canada, in March 1951. Baron retained his elected position as a TWUA vice president, however. For the next four months, the TWUA was roiled by the firing, with the Baldanzi faction attempting to overturn Baron's dismissal and drive Rieve from office. In early June, the TWUA executive council upheld Rieve's action, albeit by a slim majority. Six weeks later, the Baldanzi faction announced a "democracy movement" within the TWUA and submitted a full slate of candidates to challenge Rieve for leadership of the union.

In August 1951, the AFHWA re-affiliated with the American Federation of Labor. On April 30, 1952, TWUA delegates re-elected Rieve as president of the union. The vote was 1,223 to 720, although most observers claimed this was a startlingly close election given Rieve's near-total control over the union. The convention was a contentious one. Delegates engaged in heated debate, with many exchanges devolving into shouting matches. Rieve was forced to alter a number of his policy decisions in order to win delegate support. On the last day of the convention, Rieve fulfilled one such pledge by announcing that he was resigning from the Wage Stabilization Board in the midst of a major dispute over steelworker wages in order to devote more time to union business and less to government and other duties.

Baldanzi, no longer an office-holder in the TWUA, announced he had been hired as an organizer with the American Federation of Labor and would be working with the TWUA's arch-rival, the United Textile Workers. He called for disaffected TWUA locals to follow him into the AFL. A number of local TWUA union presidents and leaders followed him into the UTW as organizers.

Over the next several months, nearly 40 TWUA locals representing 20,000 members—about 2 percent of the union's membership—attempted to disaffiliate from the national union and join the AFL. The secession movement was a national one, involving locals in Canada, Maine, the Carolinas and mid-Atlantic states. Rieve accused Baldanzi and the dissident locals of dual unionism. Rieve induced CIO president Philip Murray to threaten wholesale raiding of AFL unions if the UTW accepted the breakaway locals into that union. Rieve suspended local officials, trusteed local unions, impounded local union funds and padlocked local union offices, and sent national staff into wavering locals to shore up support for the TWUA. By August, more than 50,000 TWUA members had left the union for the UTW. But Rieve's actions blunted the secession movement. High-level talks between AFL and CIO leaders eventually put a stop to the raids.

The crisis severely weakened Rieve's political position within the union, and led to collective bargaining difficulties. Membership losses were particularly high in the South and Canada. Although most of Rieve's political opponents had left the TWUA for the UTW, the secession movement led many of the remaining members to question Rieve's leadership of the union. The union's finances were significant affected by the disaffiliations, forcing members to raise dues to cover a budget shortfall. Rieve claimed that only 12,500 members had disaffiliated, but admitted that the union's membership had fallen by 400,000 as it defended itself from raids rather than organized new members.

The secession movement in the TWUA in 1952 aided in the merger between the AFL and CIO in 1955. Both Philip Murray and William Green had died in November 1952. The sudden outbreak of raiding deeply alarmed their successors, Walter Reuther and George Meany. The dissension within the TWUA led to a series of "no-raid" pacts between the AFL and CIO, agreements which helped pave the way for eventual merger of the two labor federations. Rieve played an important role in the AFL-CIO merger talks, pushing for merger as a solution to raiding and serving on various merger committees.

=== Other activities ===
After the merger of the AFL and CIO, Rieve was elected a vice president of the merged labor federation. As Rieve's position within the TWUA deteriorated, however, he became nationally-known for a pushing a variety of causes. He stridently attacked the Taft-Hartley Act, and declared that the law had permitted Southern textile executives to engage in a "widespread conspiracy" to destroy the union's Southern locals. He was a vocal and extremely critical opponent of President Dwight Eisenhower, and acted as the AFL-CIO's point man against the president while Meany and other leaders muted their criticism. Despite public disavowals of his extreme attacks on the administration, AFL-CIO leaders privately supported his actions and in 1955 he was named to an AFL-CIO committee on economic policy.

Rieve continued to play a role in international affairs as well. When Soviet Premier Nikita Khrushchev visited the U.S. for 13 days in September 1959, Rieve was a member of an AFL-CIO delegation which met with Khrushchev for three and a half hours in a closed-door session. He excoriated Soviet labor union officials for being puppets of the Communist regime and attacked Khrushchev as a dictator and war-monger.

== Retirement and death ==
Faced with rapidly declining membership, the 63-year-old Rieve retired as TWUA president at the union's ninth biennial convention in 1956. However, he continued to serve on the union's executive board as chairman until 1960. He was named "president emeritus" and given a lifetime annuity of $15,000 a year.

Rieve was forced to retire from the TWUA executive board in 1964. During a speech at the union's biennial convention, Rieve blasted the union's leadership for allowing the membership to fall to a mere 127,000 and for failing to organize non-union plants. Rieve retired as a vice president of the AFL-CIO after losing his TWUA office. Although Rieve had pushed for his successor, William Pollock, to be elected to the AFL-CIO executive council, Reuther supported Ralph Helstein, the president of the United Packinghouse, Food and Allied Workers.

After his forced retirement, Rieve retired to Florida, where he lived quietly. Emil Rieve died of heart failure at his home in Lauderhill, Florida, on January 24, 1975.

== Notes ==
Trade union offices
| Preceded by Founding President | President of the Textile Workers Union of America; 1939–1956 | Succeeded by William Pollock |
| Preceded by Michael Fox; C. J. Haggerty | AFL-CIO delegate to the Trades Union Congress; 1956; With: William F. Schnitzler | Succeeded by Joseph D. Keenan; Walter P. Reuther |
