= Horace Riviere =

Union organizer in the 1920s and 30s

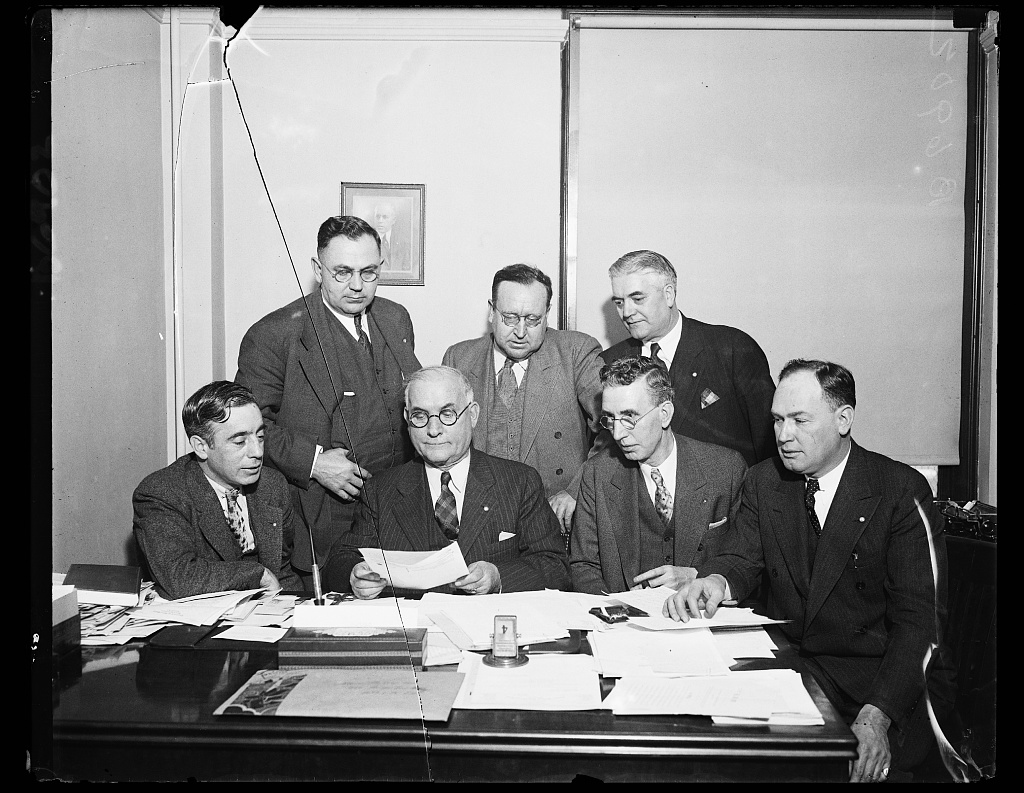
The United Textile Workers of American meet and file protest against textile mills refusing to obey rulings of National Textile Labor Relations board.

Horace A. Riviere (1887–1942) was an influential labor leader as the 4th Vice President of the Textile Workers Union of America and head of the New England district of the United Textile Workers of America during a crucial period in American industrial history. Known for his dedication to improving working conditions, advocating for labor rights, and championing the cause of textile workers, Riviere played a pivotal role in shaping the labor movement in the early to mid-20th century...

== Early life and education ==
Born at rivière Blanche, near Matane, Quebec Canada on July 3, 1886, Horace A. Riviere grew up in a working-class family, witnessing firsthand the challenges faced by industrial workers as he watched his father work tirelessly in the mills.

He started his career at Ideal Vogue Shoe Co in haverhill, ma as a shoe welter then later working as TWUA organizer.

== Labor activism and rise to leadership ==
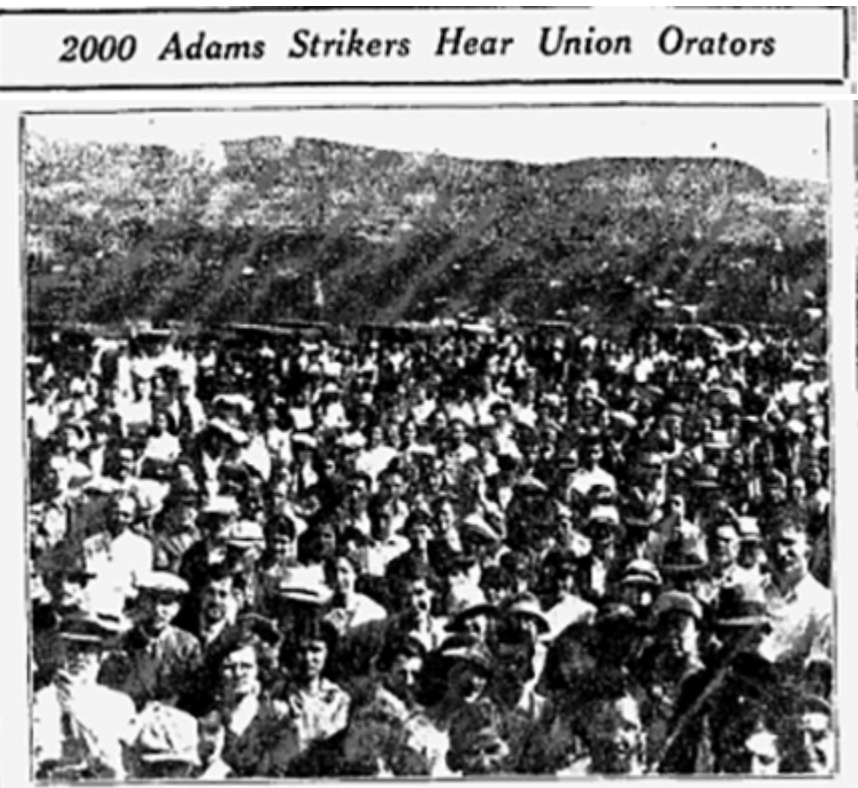
2000 Adams mill workers hear Horace A. Riviere and other union operators speak

Horace A. Riviere began his career in labor activism organizing a 14-week strike in Biddeford and Saco in 1919, then later working as TWUA organizer.

Also in 1919, after failed attempts at striking by workers, Horace Riviere met with State Board members and with mill workers from the Salem, MA Naumkeag Steam Cotton Company. The effort of Horace and the workers resulted in the factory's board to grant a 17 percent increase to most workers salaries.

Riviere used his ability to speak French to gather support from a significant French-Canadian population who worked in the textile mills. In 1932, Riviere delivered a speech in French at the Notre Dame Church to which all local French speakers were invited.

In 1921, to the officers and delegates to the 21st Annual Convention of the United Textile Workers of America, Horace Riviere described his trips to multiple mills including peaking with management at the Lafayette Mills in Woonsocket Rhode Island, Meeting with Union members in Indian Orchard, Springfield, Massachusetts, attending union meetings in Manchester, NH, then meetings with textile dyers in Pawtucket, Rhode Island, meetings in Warren and Olneyville all while working with the delegates at the Lafayette Mills in Woonsocket to settle their strike. He would later that same year be asked to attend meetings with laborers in Laconia NH, Tilton NH, Suncook NH, Hooksett NH, Franklin and somersworth NH, Lawrence MA, Lowell MA, and Nashua NH.

He then reorganized unions in Maine located in North Vassalboro ME, Pittsfield ME, and Oakland ME. He also built up the unions in Waterville Maine by having them bring in the loon-fixers into the workers union. Worked with workers in Dexter Maine at an unsuccessful attempt to settle a strike there. He met with unions in Biddleford ME.

Horace Riviere also help organize workers in Canada when ordered to attended conference with Local Union 2003 and 1112 in Montreal, Québec, and Cornwall Ontario.

His dedication and commitment to the cause quickly earned him recognition, and he steadily rose through the ranks within the union. Riviere's leadership qualities did not go unnoticed, and he was elected as the 4th Vice President of the Textile Workers Union of America. By 1934, Riviere was also the head of the New England district of the United Textile Workers of America.

As a leader of the TWUA and the UTWA, Riviere faced significant challenges, including widespread labor disputes, unequal working conditions, and a general lack of bargaining power for textile workers. Under his guidance, the union embarked on campaigns to negotiate better wages, shorter working hours, and improved safety standards for its members.

== An Excuse -- Not A Reason ==
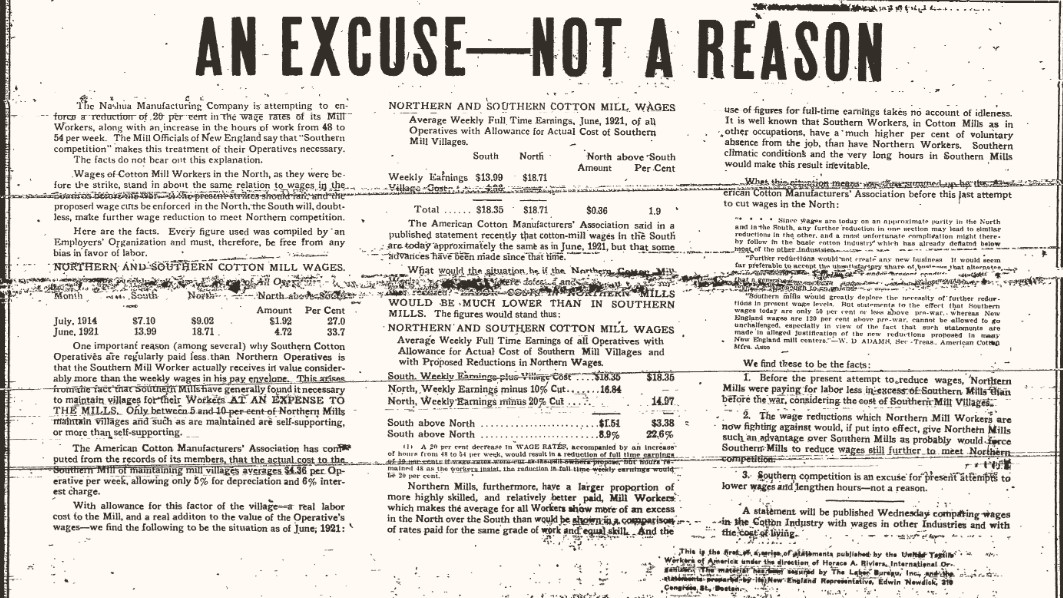
Union statement published in a Nashua newspaper on April 10, 1922

In 1922 Riviere wrote an article in the Nashua newspaper on April 10, 1922, titled, An Excuse—Not A Reason. In the article Riviere dives into great detail how northern and southern mill owners organize to keep wages low. When discussing how northern mills reference competition from southern mills, Riviere wrote:

The wage reductions which Northern mill workers are not fighting against would, if put into effect, give Northern mills such an advantage over Southern mills as probably would force Southern mills to reduce wages still further to meet Northern competition.

Riviere went on to detail how northern mills use southern wages as a comparison but they fail to mention how southern mills provide and maintain entire villages to their workers to live in. This was a value to northern mill workers that is never included in salary comparisons. Riviere went on to detail the exact costs that go into maintaining these villages to high light how northern and southern mill wages were relatively the same.

== The Wagner Act ==
In 1936, Riviere lobbied the U.S. congress to pass the National Labor Relations Act. At the Hearings House of Representative before a subcommittee of the committee on labor, Riviere gave the following statement to the committee:

Mr. Chairman and gentlemen of the committee, a very comprehensive picture of conditions in the textile industry has been presented so far, and an illustration of the suffering of the workers and the destruction of business, showing conclusively that there is an imperative need for the passage of the National Textile Act by the present session of the Congress. The New England district, which I represent as vice president, is the birthplace of the textile industry in America. And it is from this district I shall present hard, cold facts to show that unless the National Textile Act becomes law, the textile industry will be dealt a far stiffer blow than this so-called depression has yet recorded.

In 1937, The Supreme Court decision on April 12, 1937, declaring the Wagner Act (the National Labor Relations Act) constitutional proved to be a major victory for union campaigns. The act granted workers the legal right to join unions and collectively bargain. Nine days later, Horace A. Riviere announced plans to organize some 10,000 textile workers in Holyoke, Massachusetts. After a short two-week campaign, they won an election at the plant by a vote of 402 to 32. Two years later, the same union successfully organized a second plant in North Berkshire, as the Berkshire Woolen Company of Pittsfield reached an agreement with the Textile Woolen Workers’ Union

Riviere's strategic approach and negotiating skills helped the TWUA secure important victories for textile workers across the nation.

== Advocacy for Workers' Rights ==
Horace A. Riviere was a vocal advocate for workers' rights beyond the confines of the textile industry. He actively participated in broader labor movements, played a key role in the 1934 strike, collaborating with other union leaders to address systemic issues affecting workers across various sectors. Riviere's commitment to solidarity and unity within the labor movement contributed to the overall strength of the working class during a time of significant industrial and social change.

=== The Chicopee strike ===
Horace A. Riviere was pivotal in resolving the June 1937 sit-down strike at the Chicopee Manufacturing Co, owned by Johnson & Johnson, in Chicopee, MA. The strike included 78 women textile machine operators who had concerns about their modest compensation. They were paid only $14 to $18 a week. Because the woman's strike happened inside the plant, management wouldn't let anyone from outside the plant to go in to see the strikers, aside from Mr. Riviere. Because of Riviere negotiations, the Chicopee strike, which lasted 17 days, ended in a friendly and orderly way. Two weeks later there was a signed general contract and working agreement covering the Chicopee plant as well as all of Johnson & Johnson plants.

== Legacy ==
Horace A. Riviere's legacy extends beyond his tenure as the head of the TWUA. His contributions to the labor movement are remembered as instrumental in shaping the landscape of workers' rights in the United States. Riviere's efforts paved the way for improved working conditions, fair wages, and increased collective bargaining power for textile workers and, by extension, workers in other industries

Horace A. Riviere's impact on the American labor movement remains a significant chapter in the nation's history. The legacy of Horace A. Riviere serves as a reminder of the importance of collective action and the ongoing struggle for workers' rights.
