= William Pollock (unionist) =

William Pollock (November 12, 1899 – March 3, 1982) was an American labor union leader.

Pollock was born in Philadelphia, to parents who had emigrated from Scotland. He left school at the age of 14 to work in an office, before becoming a shipfitter. After World War I, he moved to work as an upholstery weaver. He joined the United Textile Workers of America, becoming a business agent of Local 25 in 1931. He supported the establishment of the Congress of Industrial Organizations, and in 1937 began working full-time for its new Textile Workers Organizing Committee (TWOC), as an organizer. He also became the founding manager of the Textile Joint Board in Philadelphia.

In 1939, the TWOC joined with other unions to form the Textile Workers Union of America, and Pollock was elected as its first secretary-treasurer. In 1953, he moved to become executive vice-president of the union, then in 1956, he was elected as its president. In the role, he sought to unite the various unions of textile workers, something not realised until after his retirement. From 1967, he also served on the executive council of the AFL-CIO. He retired in 1972, and moved to Ocean City, New Jersey.

Trade union offices
Preceded by Union founded	Secretary-Treasurer of the Textile Workers Union of America; 1939–1953	Succeeded by John Chupka
Preceded by Emil Rieve	President of the Textile Workers Union of America; 1956–1972	Succeeded by Sol Stetin
