= Sol Stetin =

Sol Stetin (April 2, 1910 – May 21, 2005) was a Polish-born American labor union leader.

Born in Pabianice, now in Poland, when Stetin was 10, he and his family emigrated to Paterson, New Jersey. He left school in the ninth grade, becoming an amateur boxer, and a semi-professional basketball player, despite being only 5 feet 4 inches tall.

In 1930, Stetin began working as a dyer, soon joining a union, and taking part in the major textile strike of 1934. By the end of the decade, he was active in the Textile Workers Union of America, serving as a shop steward, then as an organizer, and eventually the full-time director of the union's mid-Atlantic district.

In 1968, Stetin was elected as secretary-treasurer of the union, then in 1972 as its president. He led a major campaign to unionize workers in the South, targeting J.P. Stevens in particular. He also championed a merger of the various textile unions, which was achieved in 1975, with the formation of the Amalgamated Clothing and Textile Workers Union. He became the Senior Executive Vice President of the new union, accepting the less senior post in order to facilitate the merger.

Stetin retired from the union in 1982. He taught labor studies at William Paterson College, and became labor leader in residence at Rutgers University. He also helped found the American Labor Museum, in Haledon, New Jersey. In 2001, he moved to St. Louis, where he joined the St. Louis Worker Rights Board, and the local Jobs With Justice chapter. His last involvement in a labor dispute came when he attended a rally at the age of 95, a month before his death.

== Tribute ==
The Sol Stetin Award, for labor leaders who have contributed to workers' advancement, is named in his honor, as is Sol Stetin Wing of the Labor Education Center at Rutgers.

Trade union offices
Preceded by John Chupka	Secretary-Treasurer of the Textile Workers Union of America; 1968–1972	Succeeded by William DuChessi
Preceded by William Pollock	President of the Textile Workers Union of America; 1972–1976	Succeeded by Union merged
Preceded by Max Greenberg; James Housewright	AFL-CIO delegate to the Trades Union Congress; 1975; With: William Sidell	Succeeded by George Hardy; Hal C. Davis
