= George Baldanzi =

American unionist

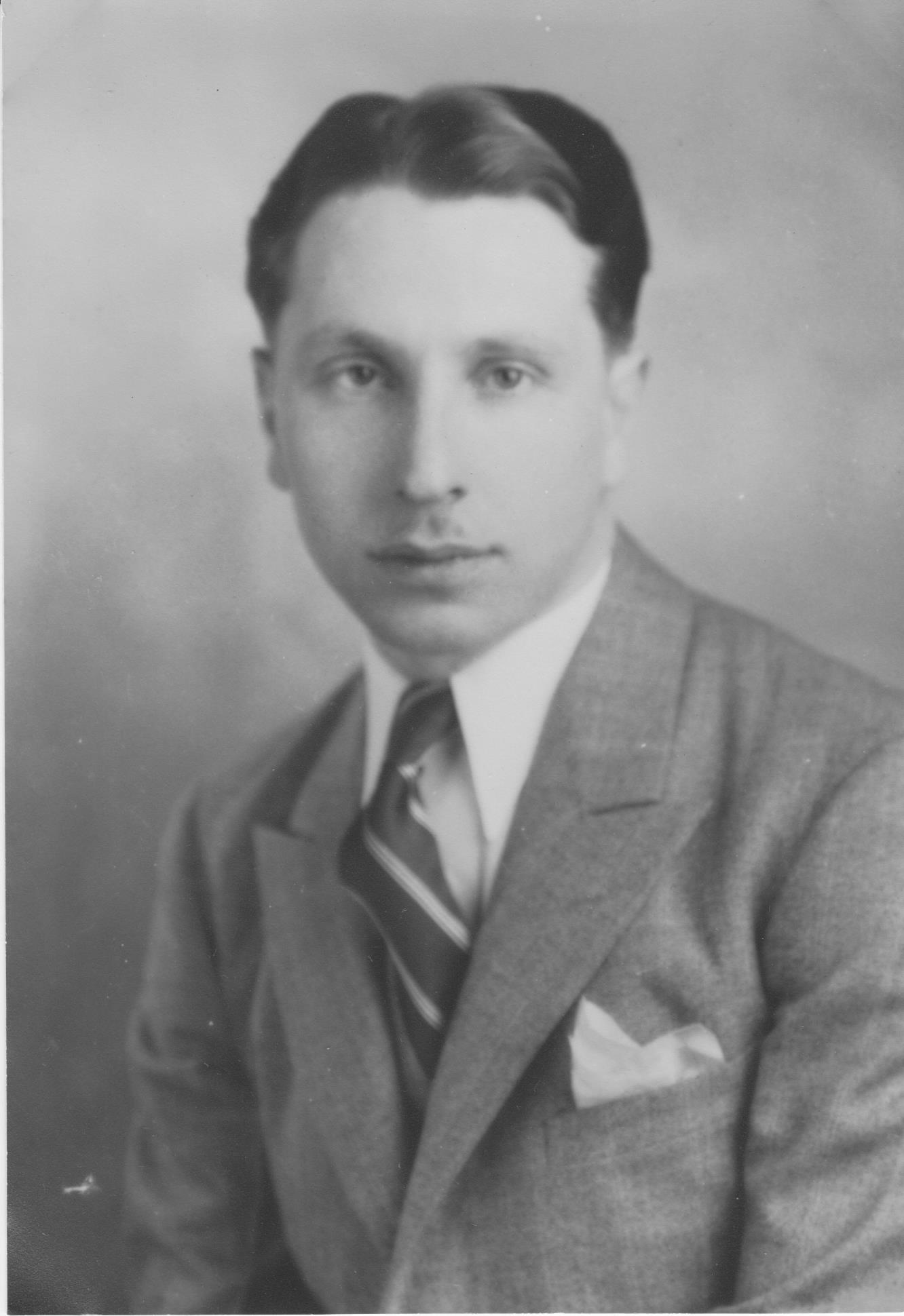
- Born: January 23, 1907; Webster, Pennsylvania
- Died: April 16, 1972 (aged 65); Hawthorne, New Jersey
- Occupation: Trade unionist
- Known for: President, United Textile Workers of America

George Baldanzi (January 23, 1907 – April 16, 1972) was an American trade unionist. He was the founding executive vice president of the Textile Workers Union of America (TWUA), and had a rivalry with Emil Rieve, the founding president of the organization. This rivalry led to his ouster from the TWUA in 1952, after which he joined the United Textile Workers of America as national organizing director. Following the merger of the American Federation of Labor (AFL) and the Congress of Industrial Organizations (CIO) into the AFL-CIO in 1958, Baldanzi was president of the United Textile Workers of America from 1958 until his death in 1972.

== Early career ==
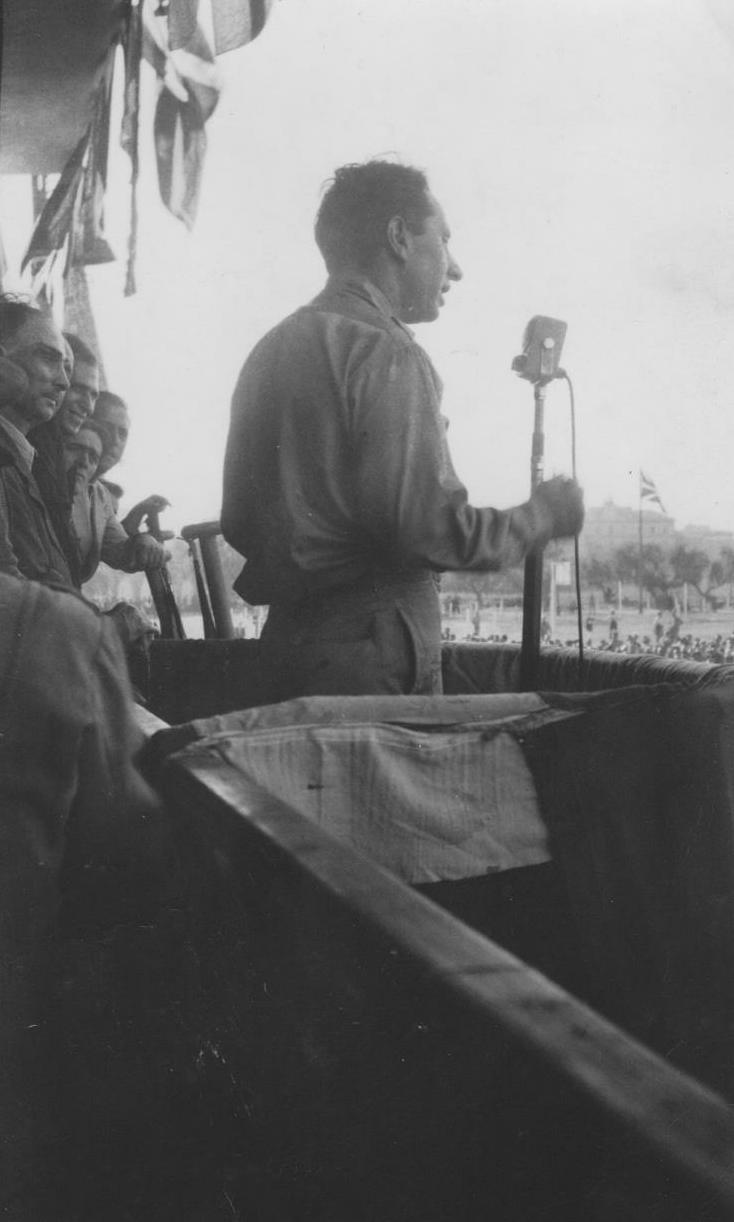
Baldanzi giving a speech in Italy

Baldanzi began his work in trade unionism by founding the Dyers Foundation, a textile workers union that would eventually expand into the AFL-affiliated United Textile Workers. Baldanzi was, with Emil Rieve, one of the founding members of the Textile Workers Union of America (TWUA) in 1939. He had been elected president of the original United Textile Workers of America (UTWA) when its previous president, Frank Gorman had been removed. Rieve was elected as president of the TWUA, and Baldanzi served as the organization's executive vice president. He also served as the chairman of the CIO's Italian-American Trade Union committee during World War II.

== Operation Dixie ==
Baldanzi was an advocate for organizing textile workers in the Southern United States, arguing with Northern delegates at the CIO's convention that they should not be seen as invading. When the CIO decided to launch an organizing campaign in the South, dubbed Operation Dixie, Baldanzi was named its deputy director, serving with director Van Bittner. Baldanzi was made the leader of the CIO's Southern Organizing Committee in August 1949 upon Bittner's death. Baldanzi spent time organizing in the South before this, and organizers under his direction had made progress as early as 1942 in Danville, Virginia and Durham, North Carolina that contributed to his reputation within the TWUA. While Bittner worked from Atlanta, Baldanzi chose to operate out of Greensboro, North Carolina because it was close to many textile plants.

== Break with Rieve ==
Baldanzi was re-elected executive vice president of the TWUA by the delegates at the union's convention in 1950. Rieve and those allied to him tried to convince delegates not to re-elect Baldanzi because the two were unable to work together.

Following the 1952 convention, Baldanzi signed as national organizing director for the UTWA, which was affiliated with the AFL. Following his decision, between 25,000 and 35,000 members left the TWUA. Baldanzi's separation from the TWUA also caused a decrease of the organization's effectiveness in the Southern United States, since the union had to use its resources to prevent Southern textile workers from following Baldanzi to the AFL.

== Personal life ==
Baldanzi and his wife, Lena Parenti, had one son Georgino.

Baldanzi died at his home in Hawthorne, New Jersey, on April 16, 1972, at the age of 65.

== Sources ==
- Daniel, Cletus E. (2001). Culture of Misfortune: An Interpretive History of Textile Unionism in the United States. Cornell University Press. ISBN 9780801438530.
- Marshall, F. Ray (1967). Labor in the South. Harvard University Press. ISBN 9780674507005.
- Minchin, Timothy J. (1997). What Do We Need a Union For?: The TWUA in the South, 1945–1955. University of North Carolina Press. ISBN 9780807846254.
- Lurie, Maxine N.; Mappen, Marc, eds. (2004). Encyclopedia of New Jersey. Rutgers University Press. ISBN 0813533252.
