= American Federation of Hosiery Workers =

Former American labor union

The American Federation of Hosiery Workers (AFHW) was a labor union representing workers involved in manufacturing hosiery.

The union's origins lay in the United Textile Workers of America (UTWA), which in 1913 formed a craft group named the American Federation of Full Fashioned Hosiery Workers. In 1915, this split from the UTWA to become independent, and while it rejoined the UTWA in 1922, it remained autonomous and affiliated to the American Federation of Labor (AFL) in its own right. On rejoining the UTWA, it adopted its final name.

The union had 10,000 members in 1926. In 1939, the UTWA merged into the new Textile Workers Union of America (TWUA), and the AFHW adopted a similar relationship with this new union. However, in 1951 it split from the TWUA and received a new charter from the AFL, transferring in 1955 to the new AFL–CIO. By 1957, it still had 10,000 members. In 1976, it merged with the TWUA and the Amalgamated Clothing Workers of America, to form the Amalgamated Clothing and Textile Workers Union.

== See also ==
- Carl Mackley Houses
