= Chiquola Mill Massacre =

1934 labor strike in South Carolina, US

- Part of Textile workers strike (1934)
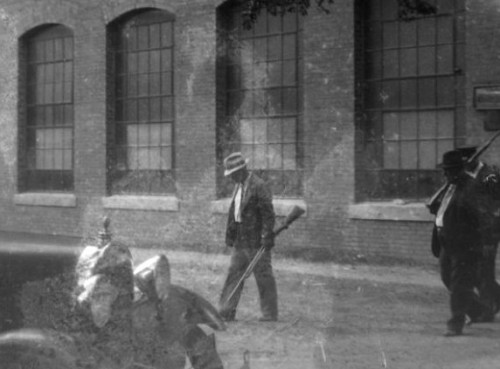
- Strikebreakers carrying guns in Chiquola Mill
- Date: September 6, 1934
- Location: Honea Path, South Carolina; 34.451653°N 82.391924°W

Number
50 to 126 deputized townsmen and anti-union millworkers	300 to 350 strikers

Casualties
- Deaths: 7 strikers killed (Note: Claude Cannon, Lee Crawford, Ira Davis, E. M. “Bill” Knight, Maxie Peterson, C. R. Rucker and Thomas Yarborough. Six died immediately and one died later from wounds.)
- Injuries: Between 20 and 75

The Chiquola Mill Massacre, also known locally as Bloody Thursday, was the violent dispersal of a picket line of striking workers outside the Chiquola textile mill in Honea Path, South Carolina. The strike was part of the textile workers' strike of 1934, which mobilized workers up and down the East Coast of the United States in response to the worsening labor conditions during the Great Depression.

Violence broke out when Dan Beacham, the mayor and magistrate in Honea Path as well as the superintendent of the mill, ordered an armed posse of strikebreakers to fire into the crowd. As the crowd fled, six strikers were shot in the back and killed, one mortally wounded, and thirty others suffered less than mortal wounds.

Beacham obstructed court proceedings against himself and the other strikebreakers, and ordered some of the strikers arrested. Dozens of unionized workers were fired or evicted from their company homes, and after the defeat of the larger strike on September 23, the unionization effort in Honea Path largely came to an end. Until the 1994 publication of "The Uprising of '34" and the subsequent journalistic work of Dan Beacham's grandson, Frank Beacham, the events of the massacre were largely undiscussed in Honea Path. Today, the event is memorialized by a stone marker in nearby Dogwood Park.

== Background ==
The Chiquola Mill was opened by James David Hammett in 1903, originally for the production of coarse cotton sheeting. It was only one of hundreds of textile mills that began to pop up throughout the American South during this time. Honea Path was a tiny, isolated town of less than seven hundred people before the mill. But over the next decade, the population was swelled by mill hands drawn from the ranks of upstate South Carolina's small farmers, who had been pressured off their farms by tightened credit. By the early 1930s, Honea Path was home to around 2,700 people, mostly employed in the mill or related industries.

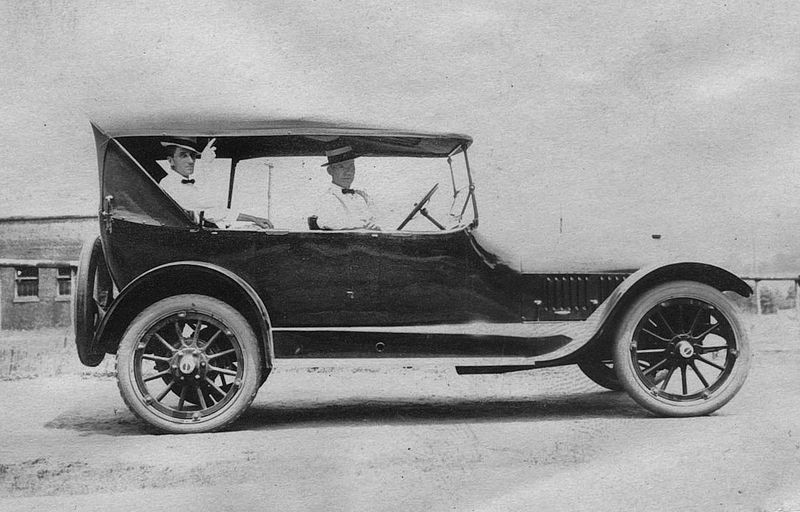
Supervisor of Chiquola Mill, Dan Beacham (right), in an expensive car.

Conditions at the mill were very poor, especially during the 1920s and into the Great Depression. All mill workers rented their homes from the company, making them vulnerable to eviction for workplace infractions. The mill employed child labor, some of which was unpaid because the children were only "learning" to work in the mill. The economic decline in the mill industry that followed the First World War led to an increase in so-called "stretch-outs": increased production quotas with no accompanying increase in pay. Although labor unions were largely absent, wildcat strikes became increasingly common towards the end of the decade. In 1929, 79,027 workers participated in eighty-one separate strikes across South Carolina. Without union organization, these strikes proved difficult to maintain or coordinate, and most were over quickly.

The election of Franklin Delano Roosevelt to the American presidency in 1932 caused a sea change in Southern mills. Unlike previous administrations, Roosevelt openly encouraged workers to join unions. Workers in Honea Path "felt like Franklin Roosevelt was going to lead us out of the dark days". The United Textile Workers (UTW) grew from 15,000 in February 1932 to 270,000 in 1934, largely by rapid expansion into the Southern United States. The National Industrial Recovery Act of 1933 created the National Recovery Administration (NRA) to write industry standards that would address some of the worst abuses. However, NRA's Textile Industry Committee was dominated by men such as Thomas Marchant, a cotton magnate, and George Sloan, the spokesman for the industry trade group. The resultant Code of Fair Competition for the Cotton Textile Industry had some benefits for the workers, such as guaranteeing the right to join a union. However, the $12 a week minimum wage was not enough to compensate for the reduction in the maximum hours a worker could work. It amounted to an institutionalization of the stretch-out and a 25% reduction in weekly wages.

== The 1934 strike ==
National leaders of the UTW were reluctant, but the new Southern members began pushing for a strike when it became clear that the NRA code was not going to produce the hoped for improvements in working conditions. Representatives to the union convention voted on August 14 to authorize a strike for the following month. The union demanded recognition from Southern mill owners, a minimum wage of $20 a week, and a reinstatement of workers fired for union activity.

Over 400,000 workers up and down the East Coast went on strike. The South was especially militant: in South Carolina, striking workers organized "flying squadrons" to travel across the state and convince workers at other mills to stop work. By this time, about half of the workers at the Chiquola Mill were part of the UTW. This was notably less than other parts of South Carolina: the management of Chiquola Mill had an unusually high level of control over mill workers' lives (even compared to other mills in the south) and workers feared that joining the union would lead to retribution by the management. Therefore, when Governor Ibra Blackwood mobilized the National Guard and State Highway Patrol against the strikers, he denied Dan Beacham's request for support in Honea Path. Instead, Beacham asked chief of police George Paige to deputize and arm 126 anti-union townspeople.

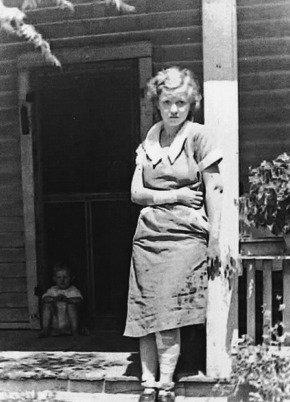
Spinstress shot during the strike.

The strike in Honea Path began on Labor Day. Before the union men arrived, the strikebreakers took up places all around the mill. Some were placed inside the windows and given sticks in addition to rifles. Others manned the roof, where they had set up a machine gun from the First World War. Chief Paige and several patrolmen stood in front of the building with guns.

On the morning of September 6, 100 to 150 workers from nearby Belton joined with 200 workers from Honea Path to picket the Chiquola Mill. Around lunchtime, a group of non-union workers attempted to enter the mill but were blocked by the picket line. The strikebreakers inside the mill threw sticks down to the non-union workers. According to testimony from Chief Paige, this caused the workers to begin to scuffle with the strikebreakers. At this point, Dan Beacham gave the order to fire, and intense firing began from the mill (although the machine gun jammed). The strikers immediately began to flee, but the firing continued. Coroner J.R. McCoy later found that all seven workers killed had been shot in the back by the strikebreakers. One, Claude Cannon, had to be shot five times (including when he was already on his hands and knees) before he finally succumbed to the bullets.

== Aftermath ==
Honea Path's churches, who were subsidized by the mill owners, refused to allow a funeral for the slain workers to be held on their grounds. Instead, on September 9 the UTW organized a funeral on an open field outside town. Perhaps 10,000 people attended, addressed by George L. Googe from the AFL and John Peel from the UTW.

At the inquest summoned by the coroner, eleven strikebreakers were charged with murder, but as the local magistrate Beacham ensured they were acquitted. When two eyewitnesses testified that he had given the order to fire, Beacham had them arrested and charged with perjury. Dozens more were fired and evicted for participating in the strike or voicing support for the union.

The massacre did not defeat the strike in Honea Path or South Carolina more generally. But larger issues doomed the workers' struggle. The main economic crisis that was affecting the textile industry was overproduction, making a strike ineffective in the short term. A longer strike might have been successful, but the rapid growth of the UTW meant that the union had not accumulated the strike funds it would need to provision such a large number of striking workers for any length of time. The national leadership was unable to keep its promise to feed workers during the strike, and many in the South went hungry. The strike finally came to an end of September 23 after a direct appeal from President Roosevelt. The UTW had none of their demands met, which greatly demoralized workers in Honea Path.

== Legacy ==
Local elites stoked fears of retaliation to prevent open discussion of events. They also spread a (false) rumor that the strikers themselves had fired the first shot, a rumor that was still in circulation well into the 1990s. Mill superintendents continued to dominate the mayorship and unionization in Honea Path stalled.

In 1994, George Stoney led the production of a PBS documentary on the 1934 textile workers' strike called the "Uprising of '34". The film prominently features the Chiquola Mill Massacre. Public screenings of the film spurred conversations in Honea Path that led to the dedication of a small stone marker for the fallen workers in nearby Dogwood Park. The documentary also prompted Frank Beacham, grandson of Dan Beacham, to begin an investigation of the events. In the decades since, however, no commemorations of the event have been organized.

On May 14 2024, the mill was demolished.

== Bibliography ==
- Beacham, Frank (2007). Whitewash: A Southern Journey Through Music, Mayhem and Murder. Booklocker.com, Inc. & Beacham Story Studio, Inc.
- Cartledge, Thomas Hudson (December 2019). Recollections: Life in South Carolina Mill Villages (MA thesis). Clemson University. Paper 3205 – via TigerPrints.
