= William Barney =

William Barney may refer to:

- William J. Barney (1867–?), American miner involved in a labor dispute
- William Pope Barney (1890–1970), American architect
