= 1907 Skowhegan textile strike =

Labor dispute in Maine, United States

- Date: January 21 – April 13, 1907
- Location: Skowhegan, Maine
- Methods: Strikes, protests, demonstrations

Parties
Textile workers; Industrial Workers of the World (IWW)	Marston Worsted Mills;

Number
~225	

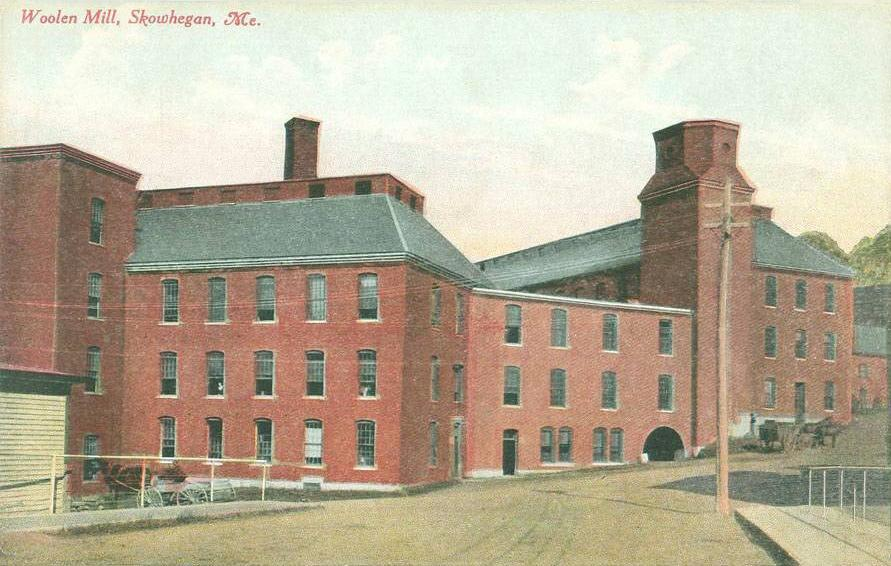
A woolen mill in Skowhegan, Maine c. 1910.

The Industrial Workers of the World supported striking textile workers.

The 1907 Skowhegan textile strike was a labor dispute between approximately 225 mill workers and the owners of the Marston Worsted Mill in Skowhegan, Maine, United States. Declared following the firing of 17 year-old French Canadian-American girl named Mamie Bilodeau, the strike was the first successful strike involving the recently formed Industrial Workers of the World.

== Background ==
After the decline of the Knights of Labor, which had embraced all workers regardless of skill, gender, nationality or other variables, women textile workers were largely considerable unorganizable by the American Federation of Labor (AFL). The AFL, which was largely run by skilled male workers, had little interest in organizing workers such as those the majority of those employed at the Marston Woolen Mills. Despite this lack of interest from the country's largest labor federation, more than 11,000 women went on strike in Maine alone between 1881 and 1900. Conditions for women textile workers were horrible and they, like their male counterparts, sought "more and better boarding houses, cleaner drinking water, more and safer fire escapes, private and sanitary bathroom facilities, higher wages, equal pay for equal work, and unions to represent women’s interests."

This particular strike was directly precipitated by a rescinded wage increase in early January 1907 as well as the firing of Mamie Bilodeau, a 17 year old worker who complained of sexual harassment by an overseer named Charles North. Workers demanded "an increase in wages, the dismissal of an overseer they accused of sexual harassment, the abolition of fines for workers, and workers’ representation on an arbitration committee."

== Strike ==
On January 21, 225 workers, most of whom were women, walked out of the mill and went on strike. The Kennebec Journal reported that the strike began "when a young woman employed as a sewer was discharged..." After negotiation with the company, a mass meeting of strikers voted to return to work on April 13. The Kennebec Journal reported "a general feeling of rejoicing in town [now] that the strike, the longest ever known in industrial Skowhegan, is now a thing of the past." Overall, strikers won the end of fines for imperfect work, the abolition of pay by piece work, recognition for a union-elected grievance committee and reinstatement of forty-two workers who had been fired for union activity. In July, the company granted a second five-percent pay increase.

== Opposition ==
Opposing the strike were both business owners as well as the craft-oriented American Federation of Labor (AFL). After the strike began, United Textile Workers of America president John Golden collaborated with the mill owners to break the strike by providing strikebreakers. However, the AFL's efforts at strikebreaking were ultimately unsuccessful.

== Aftermath ==
The strike was part of a strike wave in the New England textile industry during the first decades of the 20th century, much of it associated with the organizing of the IWW. In August 1906, silk workers in New Brighton, New York had gone on strike after the company fired IWW members. The strikes were preludes to the much larger and better known 1912 Bread and Roses Strike in Lawrence, Massachusetts.

In 2007, labor historian Charles Scontras produced a booklet for the University of Maine Bureau of Labor Education focusing on Maine workers in 1907 which in part focuses on the strike.
