= Honea Path, South Carolina =

- Town
- Seal
- Motto: "A Little Town with a Big Heart"
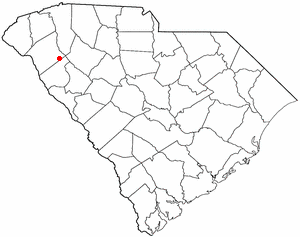
- Location of Honea Path, South Carolina
- Coordinates: 34°26′51″N 82°23′35″W
- Country: United States
- State: South Carolina
- Counties: Abbeville, Anderson

Area
  - Total: 3.51 sq mi (9.10 km^{2})
  - Land: 3.51 sq mi (9.10 km^{2})
  - Water: 0 sq mi (0.00 km^{2})
- Elevation: 787 ft (240 m)

Population (2020)
  - Total: 3,686
  - Density: 1,049.1/sq mi (405.05/km^{2})
- Time zone: UTC-5 (Eastern (EST))
  - Summer (DST): UTC-4 (EDT)
- ZIP code: 29654
- Area codes: 864, 821
- FIPS code: 45-34810
- GNIS feature ID: 2405859
- Website: Town website

Honea Path is a town primarily in Anderson County, South Carolina and extending into Abbeville County in the northwest part of the state. The population was 3,686 at the 2020 census.

== Geography ==
Honea Path is located approximately 16 miles southeast of Anderson, 28 miles south of Greenville, and 30 miles southeast of Clemson.

According to the United States Census Bureau, the town has a total area of 3.6 square miles (9.4 km^{2}), all land.

Honea Path has many lakes, rivers and creeks: towards Anderson on Highway 252 is Blue Barker Creek (aka, Blue Creek) and Barkers Creek, and towards Princeton on Highway 76 is Broad Mouth Creek.

== Demographics ==
Historical population
Census	Pop.	Note	%±
1880	228		—
1890	365		60.1%
1900	617		69.0%
1910	1,763		185.7%
1920	1,900		7.8%
1930	2,740		44.2%
1940	2,765		0.9%
1950	2,840		2.7%
1960	3,453		21.6%
1970	3,707		7.4%
1980	4,114		11.0%
1990	3,841		−6.6%
2000	3,504		−8.8%
2010	3,597		2.7%
2020	3,686		2.5%
2022 (est.)	3,788	▲	2.8%
U.S. Decennial Census

=== 2020 census ===
As of the 2020 census, there were 3,686 people, 1,465 households, and 1,027 families residing in the town.

The median age was 39.3 years. 24.8% of residents were under the age of 18 and 19.3% of residents were 65 years of age or older. For every 100 females there were 87.3 males, and for every 100 females age 18 and over there were 81.7 males age 18 and over.

0.0% of residents lived in urban areas, while 100.0% lived in rural areas.

Among households, 32.4% had children under the age of 18 living in them. Of all households, 39.0% were married-couple households, 16.4% were households with a male householder and no spouse or partner present, and 37.0% were households with a female householder and no spouse or partner present. About 29.8% of all households were made up of individuals and 13.9% had someone living alone who was 65 years of age or older. There were 1,713 housing units, of which 10.7% were vacant. The homeowner vacancy rate was 1.4% and the rental vacancy rate was 5.6%.

Honea Path racial composition
Race	Num.	Perc.
White (non-Hispanic)	2,820	76.51%
Black or African American (non-Hispanic)	635	17.23%
Native American	6	0.16%
Asian	14	0.38%
Other/Mixed	125	3.39%
Hispanic or Latino	86	2.33%

=== Demographic estimates ===
In 2023, of the residents of Honea Path, 2,605 lived in Anderson County and 81 lived in Abbeville County.

=== 2000 census ===
As of the census of 2000, there were 3,504 people, 1,535 households, and 1,037 families residing in the town. The population density was 1,004.1 inhabitants per square mile (387.7/km^{2}). There were 1,681 housing units at an average density of 481.7 per square mile (186.0/km^{2}). The racial makeup of the town was 79.02% White, 19.55% African American, 0.17% Native American, 0.20% Asian, 0.06% Pacific Islander, 0.26% from other races, and 0.74% from two or more races. Hispanic or Latino of any race were 1.00% of the population.

There were 1,535 households, out of which 25.0% had children under the age of 18 living with them, 45.5% were married couples living together, 18.2% had a female householder with no husband present, and 32.4% were non-families. 30.2% of all households were made up of individuals, and 16.9% had someone living alone who was 65 years of age or older. The average household size was 2.25 and the average family size was 2.75.

In the town, the population was spread out, with 21.8% under the age of 18, 7.9% from 18 to 24, 23.5% from 25 to 44, 24.5% from 45 to 64, and 22.3% who were 65 years of age or older. The median age was 42 years. For every 100 females, there were 84.5 males. For every 100 females age 18 and over, there were 81.6 males.

The median income for a household in the town was $30,938, and the median income for a family was $38,980. Males had a median income of $28,635 versus $24,107 for females. The per capita income for the town was $17,643. About 10.9% of families and 14.9% of the population were below the poverty line, including 16.5% of those under age 18 and 21.4% of those age 65 or over.

== History ==
The Chiquola textile mill was very important in Honea Path's early development. On September 6, 1934, management perpetrated the Chiquola Mill Massacre against workers taking part in a general textile strike. Textile factory guards killed six picketers and injured approximately thirty more in the altercation. The men were reported to have been shot fleeing the picket lines, and many were found with bullet wounds in their backs. This event is featured in the Public Broadcasting Service (PBS) documentary on the POV series called "The Uprising of '34".

The Obediah Shirley House was listed on the National Register of Historic Places in 1999.

== Education ==
Public education in the Anderson County portion of Honea Path is administered by Anderson School District Two. The district operates Honea Path Elementary School, Honea Path Middle School, and Belton-Honea Path High School. The Abbeville County portion is in the Abbeville County School District.

Honea Path has a public library, a branch of the Anderson County Library System.

== Emergency services ==
EMS - Emergency Medical Services - Paramedic level service is provided by Anderson County EMS, utilizing quick response vehicles (QRVs) which are equipped and staffed at the paramedic level. Basic life support (BLS) transport is provided by Medshore Ambulance Service through a contract with Anderson County. Fire - Fire/Rescue service is provided by the Honea Path Fire Department. This is a primarily volunteer fire department with some paid staffing. Mutual aid back-up is also provided to and from, surrounding departments of the Anderson County Fire Department. Law Enforcement - The Honea Path Police department provides full law enforcement services to the town. They are backed-up, when necessary, by the Anderson County Sheriff's Office and the Abbeville County Sheriff's Office. The department also provides mutual aid back-up to those agencies as requested.
