= Oscar Stonorov =

German-American architect (1905–1970)

Oscar Gregory Stonorov (December 2, 1905 – May 9, 1970) was a modernist architect and architectural writer, historian and archivist who emigrated to the United States from Germany in 1929. His first name is often spelled "Oskar".

== Early life ==
Stonorov was born in Frankfurt, Germany, the son of Helene (Traub) and Gregor Stonorov, an engineer. He studied at the University of Florence (1924/25), Italy and at the University of Zurich (1925–1928), Switzerland, and apprenticed with French sculptor Aristide Maillol. In 1928, he worked in the offices of André Lurçat in Paris, France.

In these years, Stonorov researched and co-edited with Willy Boesiger the publication of the work of Swiss architect Le Corbusier, covering the period 1910 to 1929 (published in 1929). With Boesiger's work continuing for four decades, this would be the first volume of the definitive 8 volume set of the complete works of Le Corbusier and Pierre Jeanneret (completed in 1969; numerous re-editions with varying titles and in different languages).

== Career ==
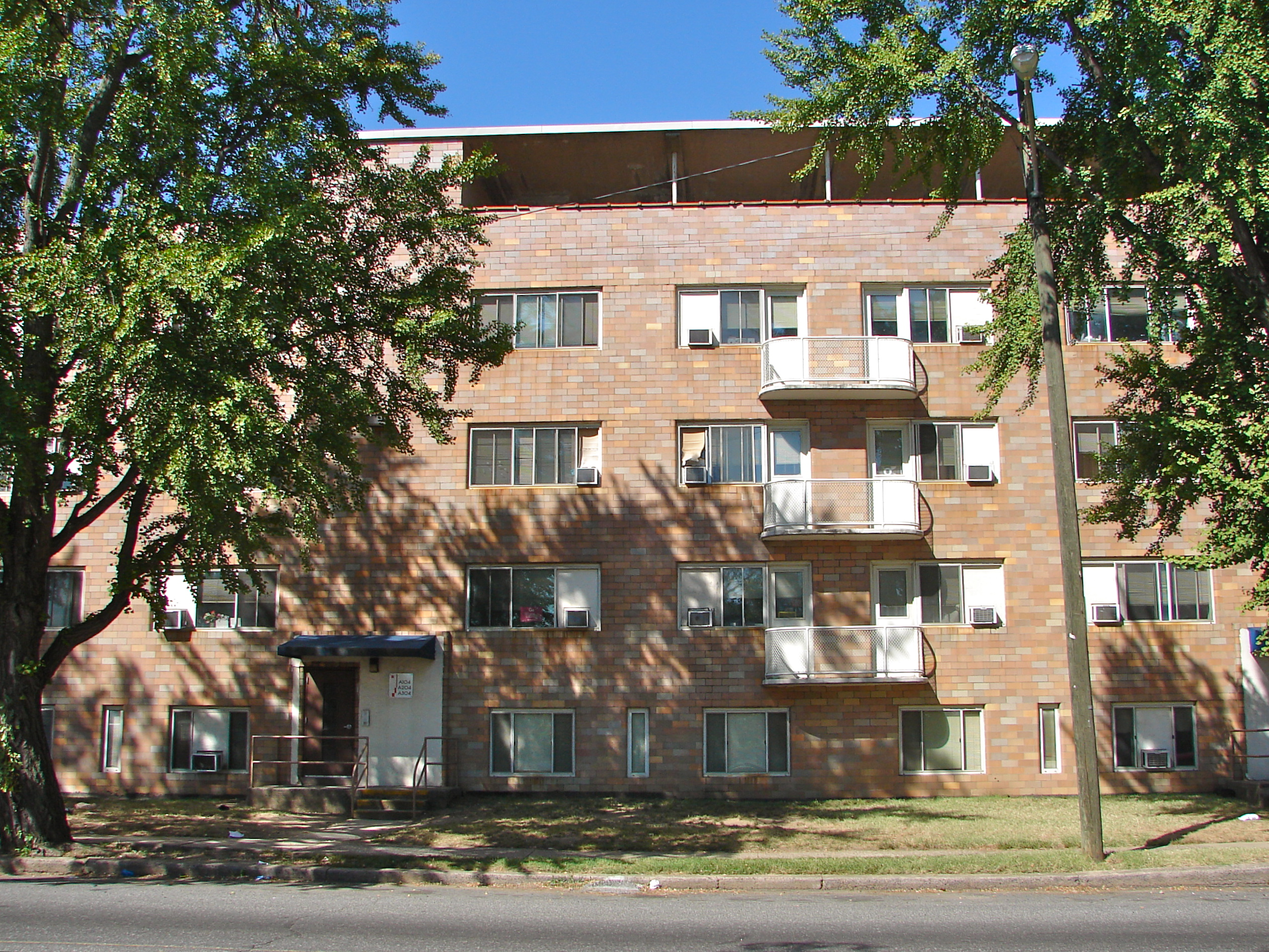
Carl Mackley Houses

In 1940, Stonorov, along with George Howe, worked on the design of housing developments in Pennsylvania with Louis Kahn. A formal architectural office partnership between Stonorov and Louis Kahn began in February 1942 and ended in March 1947, produced fifty-four known projects and structures. In 1943, Stonorov co-wrote with Kahn Why City Planning Is Your Responsibility and in 1944 again collaborated with Kahn to write You and Your Neighborhood ... A Primer for Neighborhood Planning. Between 1950 and 1954 Philadelphia architect and future Pritzker Prize winner Robert Venturi (who later worked directly for Kahn) worked in the offices of Stonorov. In 1957 he partnered with Frank Haws, with whom he designed the Palace Hotel in Philadelphia (1963) and the Indian Pavilion for the 1964 New York World's Fair (with Mansinh Rana).

Stonorov lived and worked near Philadelphia, where he designed modernist public housing, such as the Carl Mackley Houses, which was added to the Philadelphia Register of Historic Places in 1982 and the National Park Service's National Register of Historic Places in 1998. Because Stonorov was not registered as an architect in the United States at the time, William Pope Barney was enlisted as chief architect for the purposes of obtaining permits from the city.

== Death ==
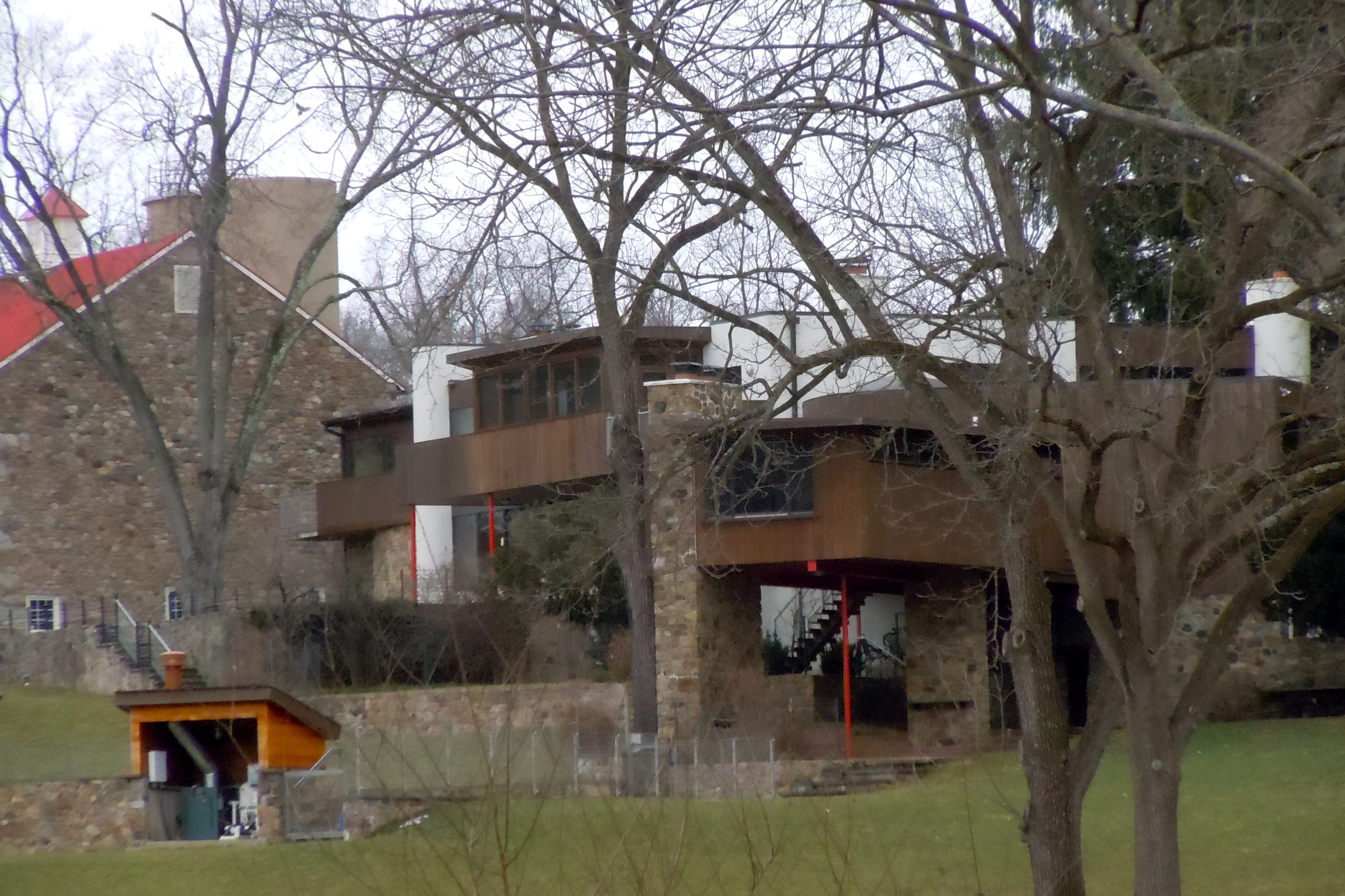
The Stonorov house at Avon Lea Farm, designed by Stonorov around an old stone farmhouse

Stonorov died May 9, 1970, with Walter P. Reuther, president of the United Automobile Workers, when Reuther's Gates Learjet 23 crashed on approach to Emmet County Airport (now Pellston Regional Airport) in Pellston, Michigan. Also killed were Reuther's wife, his bodyguard, and the plane's pilot and copilot. Reuther and Stonorov were to have performed the final inspection of a union recreation and education facility Stonorov had designed at Black Lake, Michigan 25 miles (40 km) from Pellston. The center was to open three weeks after the crash.

== Family ==
With his wife, Elizabeth Foster "Miss Betty" Stonorov (March 5, 1906 - December 8, 2003), Stonorov had daughters Katrina Daly, Tasha Stonorov Churchill and Andrea Stonorov Foster as well as a son Derek Stonorov and nine grandchildren. They lived at Avon Lea Farm in Charlestown Township, outside Philadelphia.

== Timeline of works ==
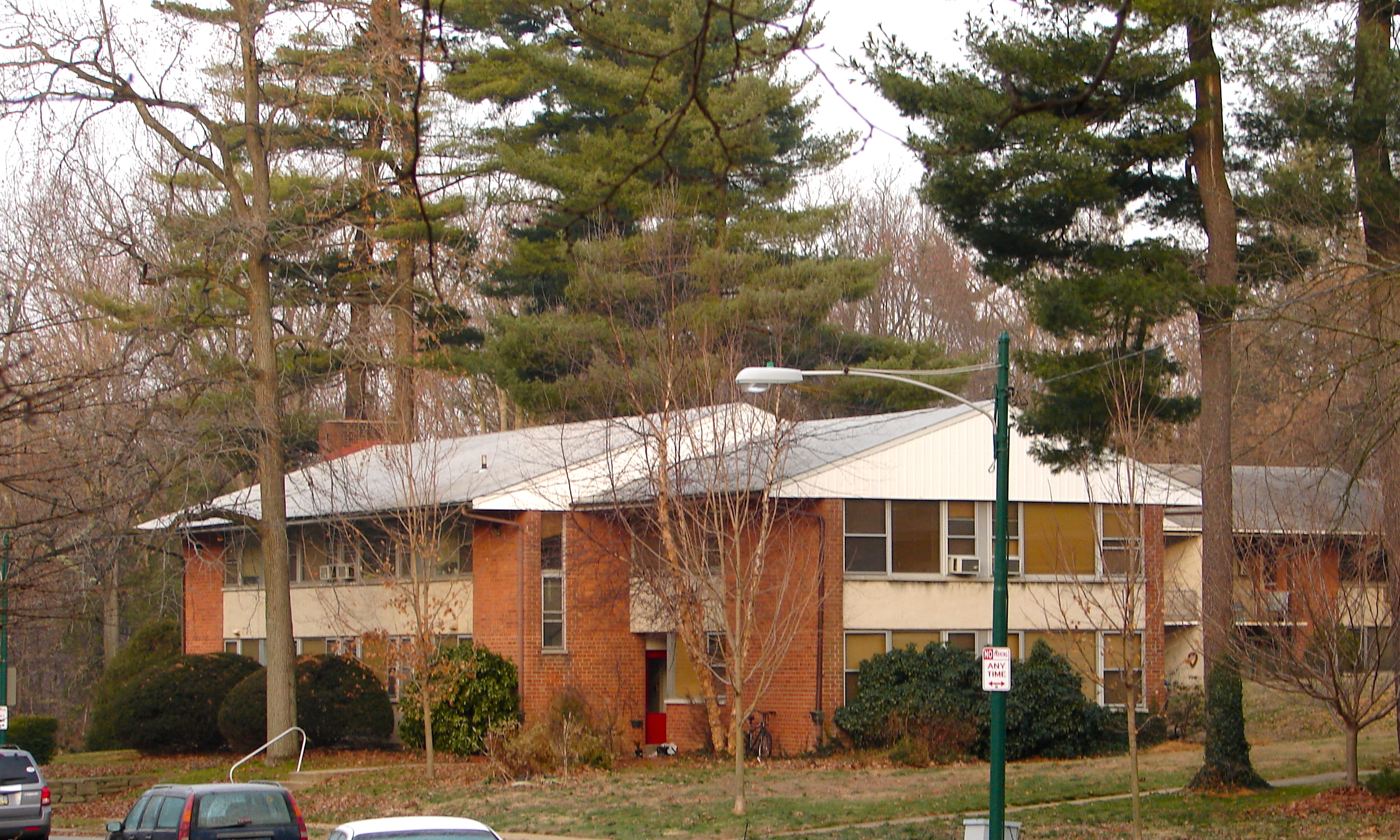
Cherokee Apartments

- 1933 - Juniata Park Housing, AKA Carl Mackley Houses, Philadelphia (with Alfred Kastner and W. Pope Barney)
- 1939 - Charlestown Playhouse, Chester County, Pennsylvania
- 1939 - Children's World, 1939 New York World's Fair
- 1940 - Avon Lea, Chester County, Pennsylvania (Stonorov personal home)
- 1940 - Bake House III, Torresdale, Philadelphia, Pennsylvania, with Edmund Bacon, still standing, on site of Delaire Landing residential community, 9355 State Road, formerly the site of the historic Bake House. Contact 27thpal@comcast.net for photos and a substantial amount of information
- 1940 - Carver Court, Coatesville, Pennsylvania (with Louis Kahn and George Howe)
- 1942 - Pennypack Woods, Philadelphia (with Louis I. Kahn and George Howe)
- 1943 - Model Neighborhood Rehabilitation Project, Philadelphia (with Louis I. Kahn)
- 1945 - Prefabricated Houses, Chester County, Pennsylvania (with Louis I. Kahn)
- 1948 - Penn Towne Apartment Complex, Philadelphia
- 1950 - Cherokee Apartments, Philadelphia (Robert Venturi was a draftsman for this project)

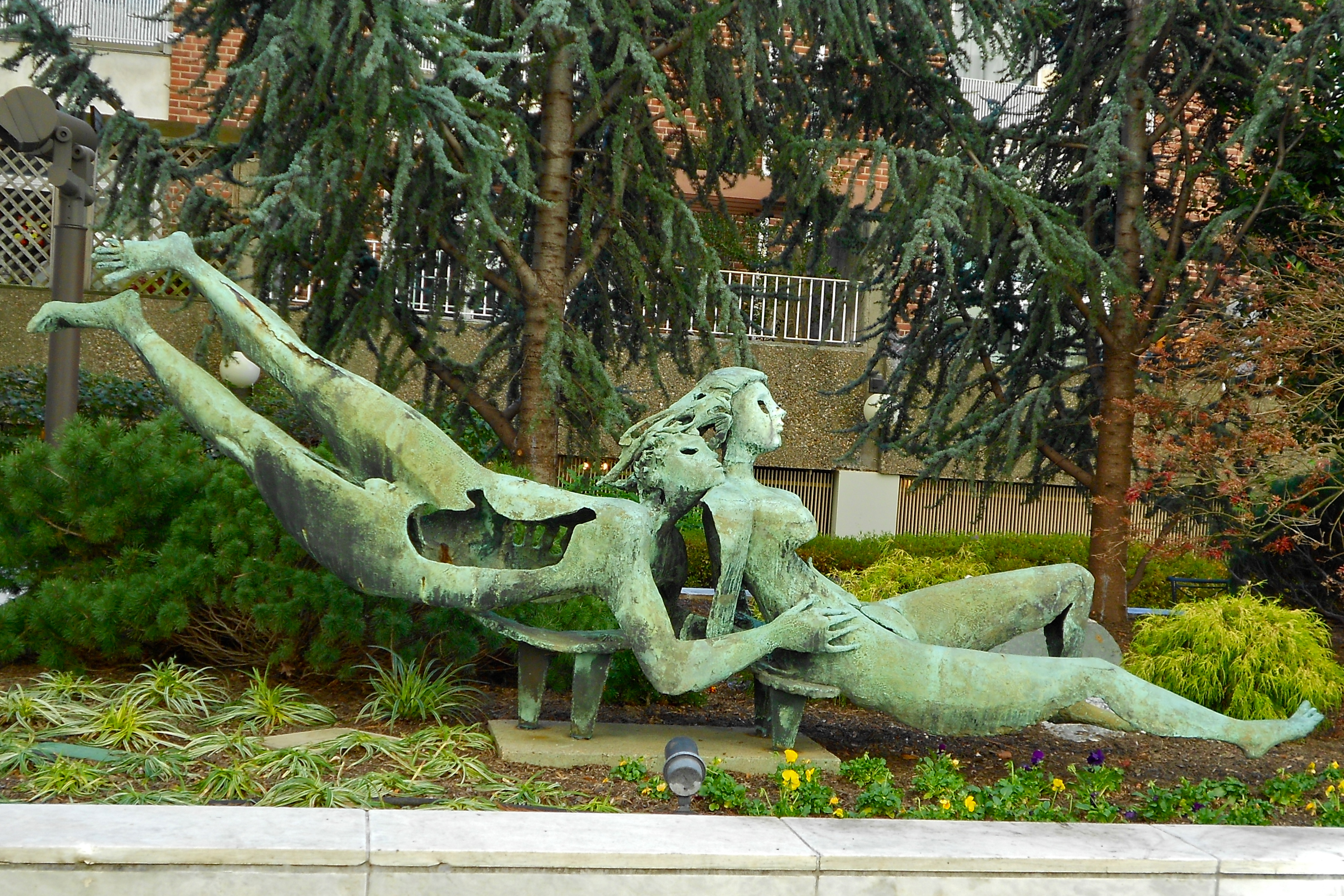
Sculpture by Stonorov of Adam and Eve in the Hopkinson House which he also designed

- 1951 - UAW Solidarity House, Detroit
- 1952 - Martin Residence, Wyncote, Pennsylvania
- 1952 - Friends Housing Cooperative, Philadelphia)
- 1953 - Schuylkill Falls Housing Project, Philadelphia (demolished, 1996)
- 1962 - Hopkinson House, Washington Square, Philadelphia
- 1964 - India Pavilion at 1964 World's Fair (with Stonorov & Haws and Mansinh Rana)
- 1969 - Casa-studio di Jorio Vivarelli, Pistoia, Italy
- Nancy Cook Most Residence, Valley Forge, PA
- 1970 - UAW Retreat and Education Facility, Black Lake, MI
