= Obediah Shirley House =

Historic house in South Carolina, United States

- U.S. National Register of Historic Places
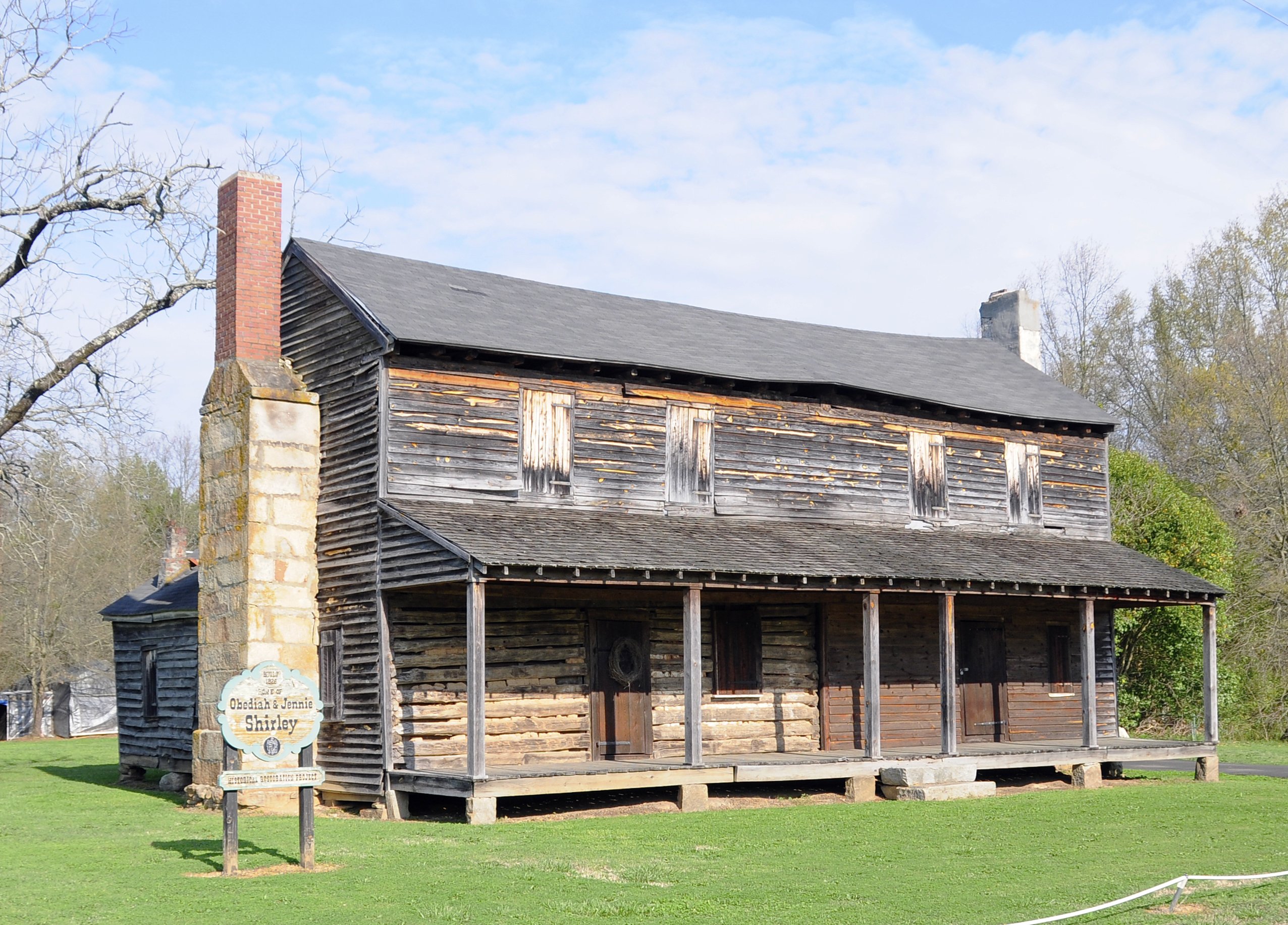
- Obediah Shirley House, 2012

- Location within South Carolina Location within the United States
- Location: 328 Bagwell Road; Honea Path, South Carolina 29654
- Coordinates: 34.451599°N 82.414044°W
- Area: 1 acre (0.40 ha)
- Built: 1826
- Architectural style: Carolina upcountry farmhouse
- NRHP reference No.: 99000201
- Added to NRHP: September 3, 1999

The Obediah Shirley House, sometimes referred to as the Obediah and Jennie Shirley Home is a historic farmhouse with a fieldstone foundation, located near Honea Path, South Carolina. Its construction was completed in several phases in order to accommodate the Shirley family as their family grew in number. The original, one-story log cabin was built in 1826 with the second-floor and two rooms to the north added before 1850. After 1850, a third room was added to the house, which increased the width. The front porch and kitchen were added in later in the 19th century.

The house was owned by descendants of Obediah Shirley until 1988, when the house and one acre of land was donated to the Obediah Shirley House Foundation. Structural restoration was completed after the donation, including leveling the foundation with boulders from an adjacent property, replacement of the porch roof framing, and a new roof. Listed in the National Register September 3, 1999. The house is currently open to tour by appointment.
