= Carl Mackley Houses =

- U.S. National Register of Historic Places
- Philadelphia Register of Historic Places
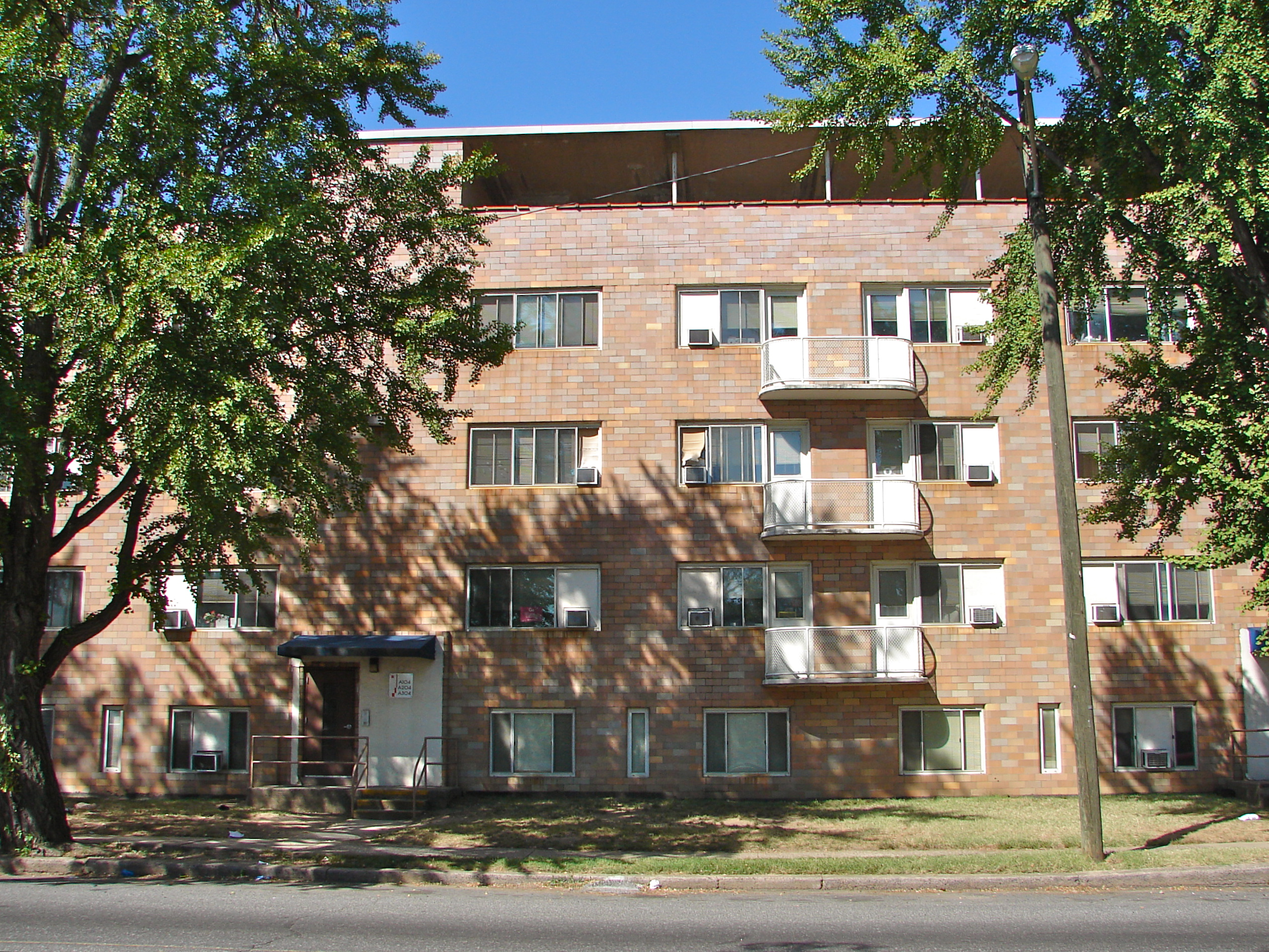
- Carl Mackley Houses in 2010

- Location within Philadelphia Location within Pennsylvania Location within the United States
- Location: 1401 E. Bristol St. Philadelphia, Pennsylvania
- Coordinates: 40°0′44″N 75°5′56″W
- Area: 4.5 acres (1.8 ha)
- Built: 1933–1935
- Architects: Oscar Stonorov, Alfred Kastner, et al.
- Architectural style: International Style
- NRHP reference No.: 98000401

Significant dates
- Added to NRHP: May 6, 1998
- Designated PRHP: June 3, 1982

The Carl Mackley Houses, also originally known as Juniata Park Housing, is a private apartment complex in the Juniata neighborhood of Philadelphia, Pennsylvania. Built in 1933–1934 as single-family apartments, it opened in 1935. The project was sponsored by the American Federation of Full Fashioned Hosiery Workers, with financing by the Housing Division of the Public Works Administration, of which it was the first funded project. The complex was named for a striking hosiery worker killed by non-union workers during the H.C. Aberle Company strike in 1930.

The complex was designed in the International Style by Oscar Stonorov and Alfred Kastner. Since neither designer was a registered architect, they enlisted Philadelphia architect William Pope Barney (1890–1970) as the architect of record.

The five-building complex covers an entire city block, bounded by Castor Avenue, Bristol, M, and Cayuga Streets. Four of the buildings, of three stories, each contain 71 one-, two-, and three-bedroom apartments, in six different layouts, above underground garages. The fifth building, originally a community center, now houses a laundry. The complex originally featured a swimming pool and wading pool, since filled in, and is now operated by private investors as rental apartments.

The complex was added to the Philadelphia Register of Historic Places on June 3, 1982, and the National Register of Historic Places in 1998. It won a Landmark Building Award from the American Institute of Architects in 2000.
