= John Golden (trade unionist) =

Labor leader in the United Textile Workers of America

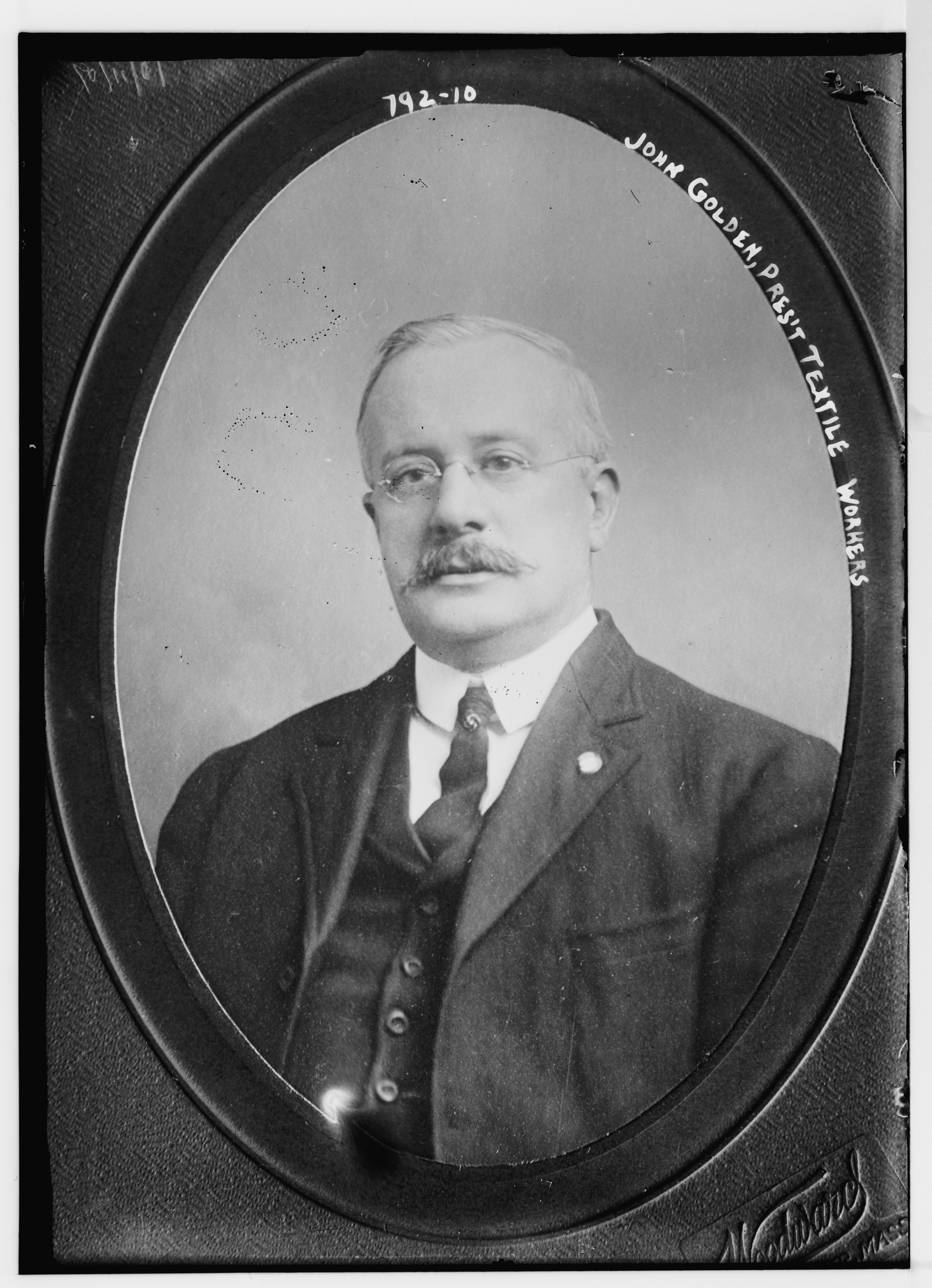
- Born: August 3, 1862; Lancashire, England
- Died: June 9, 1921 (aged 58); Brooklyn, New York City, U.S.
- Occupation: Labor organizer

John Golden (August 3, 1862 – June 9, 1921) was an American textile worker and trade union leader. He was elected president of the United Textile Workers of America (UTW) each year from 1902 until shortly before his death in 1921. At the time of his death, he was declared as important to textile unionism as John Mitchell was to mining unionism.

Originally from Lancashire, England, he began working as a boy as a mule spinner in the city's cotton mills at the age of 10. Active in the craft union movement, he was blacklisted by employers due to union activity and emigrated to the United States. He settled in the textile hub of Fall River, Massachusetts and was eventually elected treasurer of the National Mule Spinners' Organization of the United States and Canada. While in that office in 1902, he was elected president of the UTW. During his time as president, the UTW largely ignored textile workers who were not skilled white men, as was common in unions affiliated with the American Federation of Labor. As such, he was a vocal opponent of the Industrial Workers of the World (IWW), which was an anti-capitalist industrial union which sought to organize all textile workers into the same union regardless of race, gender, nationality, or skill. To undermine the IWW, Golden collaborated with company officials and frequently sent strikebreakers to IWW-led strikes, including the 1907 Skowhegan textile strike, the 1912 Lawrence textile strike, and the 1913 Paterson silk strike. After the strike, IWW member and songwriter Joe Hill satirized Golden in the song "John Golden and the Lawrence Strike." Golden became ill during the 1921 UTW convention and died in Brooklyn, New York on June 9. He was buried in St. Patrick's Cemetery in Fall River.

Trade union offices
Preceded by James Tansey	President of the United Textile Workers of America; 1902–1921	Succeeded by Thomas F. MacMahon
Preceded by William D. Mahon; Matthew Woll	American Federation of Labor delegate to the Trades Union Congress; 1917; With: James Lord	Succeeded by William J. Bowen; Samuel Gompers
