= William Pope Barney =

American architect

William Pope Barney FAIA (October 15, 1890 – March 17, 1970) was an American architect.

Barney was born 1890 in Columbus, Georgia, where he received his early education. He received a bachelor's degree in architecture from the Georgia Institute of Technology in 1911. He then came to Philadelphia, where he earned a second B.S. in architecture in 1912 and a master's degree in 1913, both from the University of Pennsylvania. By 1915 he was employed in the office of his mentor, Paul Cret.

He served on the faculties of Carnegie Institute of Technology, Princeton University, Columbia University, Pennsylvania State University, and Swarthmore College.

He was elected a Fellow in the American Institute of Architects in 1950.

== Projects ==
Since Barney worked throughout most of his career in architectural firms, mostly as a partner (notably Barney and Banwell), it is difficult to ascertain which projects he was personally involved with. A few are listed here.

=== Philadelphia ===
- He served as the architect of record of the Carl Mackley Houses, which were actually designed by Oscar Stonorov and Frank Kastner, neither of whom was registered as an architect (1933-1934).
- James Weldon Johnson Homes (a.k.a. Glenwood Housing) Barney was the chief architect for this project, under the technical supervision of Walter H. Thomas. Associated architects included Roy W. Branwell, Edmund Gilchrist, Harry E. Parker, Walter H. Thompson, and Frank R. Watson. The project was completed in 1940.

=== Elsewhere ===
- Blanchard Residence, 666 Lawson Ave., Penfield, Haverford Township, Delaware County, Pa.
- Oak Run (residence), Flourtown, Pa. (1938).

== Publications ==
- Fundamentals of Architectural Design: A Textbook for Beginning College Students, a Ready Reference for Architects, William Wirt Turner (author), W. Pope Barney (illustrator)
- Some domestic architecture in Surrey and Sussex (The Tuileries Brochures: A Series of Monographs on European Architecture with Special Reference to Roofs of Tile.), William Pope Barney, Vol. II, No. 4, July 1930.
