= Industrial slave =

An industrial slave is a type of slave who typically worked in an industrial setting. These slaves often had work that was more dangerous than agricultural slaves. Besides agricultural and domestic service, slaves were a main labor force in mining, in shipping as galley slaves, and in many kinds of manufacturing.

== United States ==
In the antebellum southern United States, industrial slaves were often the property of a company instead of an individual. These companies spanned various industries including sawmills, cotton gins and mills, fishing, steamboats, sugar refineries, coal and gold mining, and railroads.

Industrial slaves were exposed to many dangerous jobs in factories. Most of the machinery and tools were very new and the simplest mistake could mean the loss of a hand, foot, or even death. Industrial slaves worked twelve hours per day, six days per week. The only breaks they received were for a short lunch during the day, and Sunday or the occasional holiday during the week.

Industrial textile mills in the old south that used slave labor "Usually earned annual profits on capital between 10 and 65 percent and averaging about 16 percent." The use of industrial slaves sometimes allowed a bankrupt company to be resurrected: "The Woodville mill, which went bankrupt with free labor, annually paid 10 to 15 per cent dividends after switching to slave labor".
