= Textile Workers Union of America =

Former trade union of the United States

TWUA
- Textile Workers Union of America
- Predecessor: United Textile Workers of America, Textile Workers Organizing Committee
- Merged into: Amalgamated Clothing and Textile Workers Union
- Successor: Union of Needletrades, Industrial and Textile Employees, UNITE HERE, Workers United
- Founded: 1939
- Dissolved: 1976
- Location: United States of America
- Affiliations: CIO, AFL–CIO

The Textile Workers Union of America (TWUA) was an industrial union of textile workers established through the Congress of Industrial Organizations in 1939 and merged with the Amalgamated Clothing Workers of America to become the Amalgamated Clothing and Textile Workers Union (ACTWU) in 1976. It waged a decades-long campaign to organize J.P. Stevens and other Southern textile manufacturers that achieved some successes.

== History ==
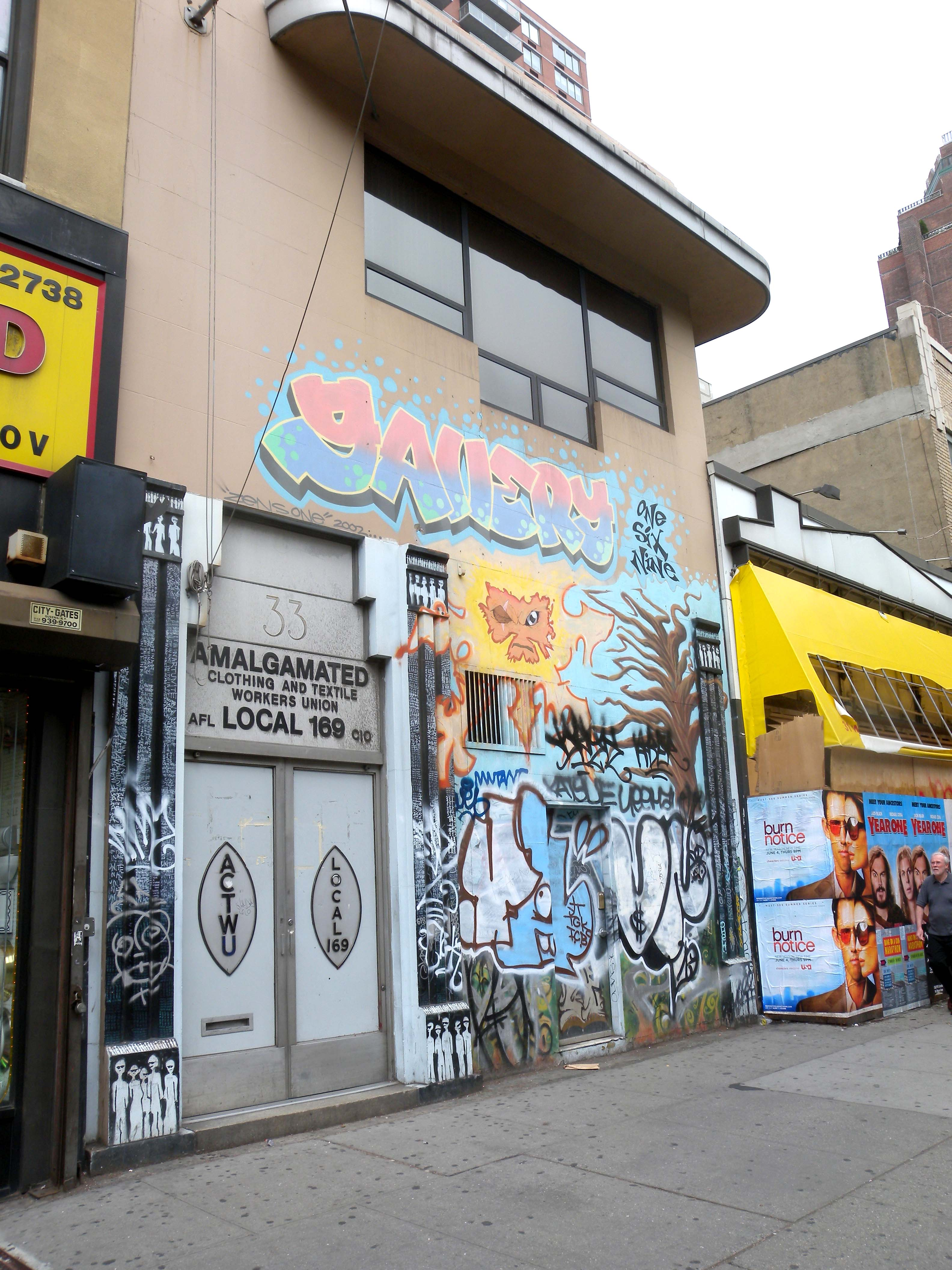
Local 169, New York City

In 1901, the United Textile Workers of America (UTW) was formed as an affiliate of the American Federation of Labor (AFL). The UTW, which had its greatest strength in the North, called a strike of textile workers in 1934 to protest worsening working conditions during the Great Depression. The strike was, however, a failure, especially in the South. UTW also called a strike in 1922.

In 1937, the Committee for Industrial Organization (later the Congress of Industrial Organizations or CIO) formed the Textile Workers Organizing Committee (TWOC) as an alternative to the UTW. In 1939, locals from the TWOC and the UTW merged to form the Textile Workers Union of America (TWUA). The TWUA led numerous organizing campaigns in the union-resistant South, aiming to help textile workers achieve higher wages, health insurance and other benefits, and to ensure fair labor practices.

The TWUA was a leading organization in Operation Dixie, the CIO's post-World War II drive to organize industries in the American South. The unions hoped that by building on the successful organization of wartime industries and using methods proved effective by auto and steel workers, it would be possible to overcome the consequences of the UTW's failed 1934 strike. The TWUA was able to organize new plants and revive some moribund organizations, but was unable to achieve a breakthrough win which would organize the whole industry. Operation Dixie was retired by 1954.

In the 1960s and 1970s the TWUA found itself in competition with other unions for representation in large Southern plants. In 1976, the TWUA merged with another garment union, the Amalgamated Clothing Workers of America, to form the Amalgamated Clothing and Textile Workers Union (ACTWU).

After several further mergers, the TWUA's textile locals became part Workers United, a manufacturing and hospitality workers union.

== Leadership ==
=== Presidents ===
1939: Emil Rieve
1956: William Pollock
1972: Sol Stetin

=== Secretary-Treasurers ===
1939: William Pollock
1956: John Chupka
1968: Sol Stetin
1972: William DuChessi

== See also ==
- 1922 New England Textile Strike

== Further reading and movies ==
- Greenhouse, Steven. "Sol Stetin, 95, Labor Leader Who Unionized J. P. Stevens, Dies." New York Times. May 24, 2005.
- Leifermann, Henry P. Crystal Lee, a Woman of Inheritance. New York: Macmillan, 1975. (This account of union organizer Crystal Lee was later made into the Academy Award-winning movie Norma Rae.)
- McLaurin, Melton Alonza. Paternalism and Protest: Southern Cotton Mill Workers and Organized Labor, 1875–1905. Westport, Conn.: Greenwood Publishing, 1971. ISBN 0-8371-4662-3
- Norma Rae (Academy Award-winning movie about union organizer Crystal Lee).

=== Archives ===
- Inventory of the Textile Workers Union of America. South Region Records, 1947-1981, in the Southern Historical Collection, UNC-Chapel Hill.
- Textile Workers Union of America, Georgia-Tennessee-Alabama Joint Board records, 1952–1980. Georgia State University Special Collections Department, Georgia State University Library Atlanta, GA 30303-3202. Identification: L1985-10. Online research guide Accessed May 24, 2005.
- Textile Workers Union of America, Northwest Georgia Joint Board records, 1949–1976. Georgia State University Special Collections Department, Georgia State University Library Atlanta, GA 30303-3202. Identification: L1980-22. Online research guide Accessed May 24, 2005.
- Textile Workers Union of America Philadelphia Joint Board Records, 1921–1980 Temple University Libraries Urban Archives. Identification: URB 54 Online research guide Accessed May 24, 2005.
