= 1934 United States textile workers' strike =

United States labor action

United States textile workers' strike of 1934
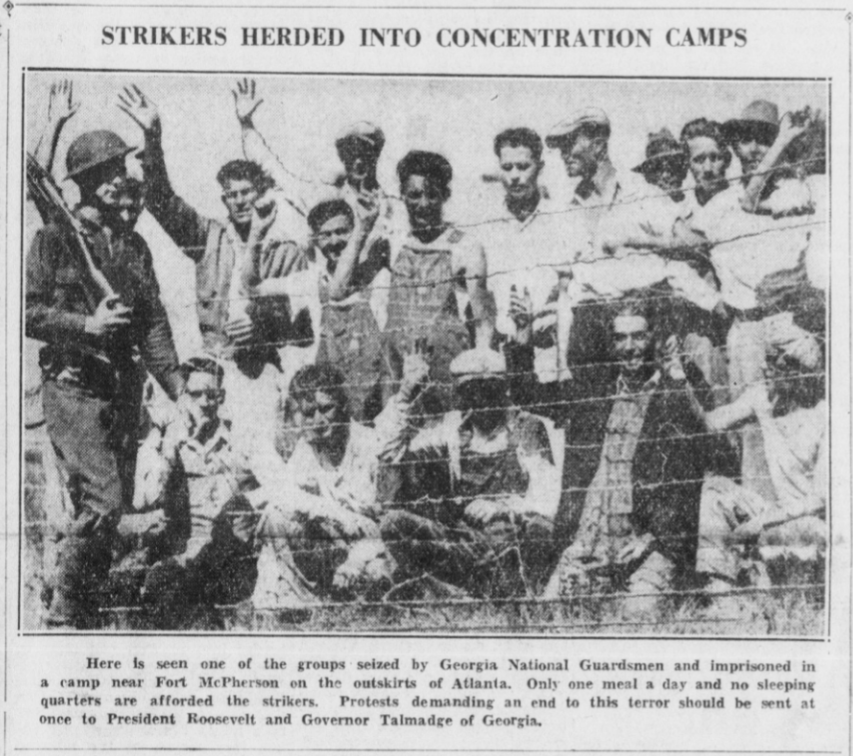
- "Strikers herded into concentration camps" Daily Worker September 22, 1934
- Date: Sept. 1, 1934 - Sept. 23, 1934
- Location: East Coast of the United States
- Caused by: Stretch-outs, reduction in real wages, retaliation
- Goals: Union recognition in the South, a minimum wage of $20 a week, reinstatement of workers fired for union activity
- Result: Defeat of the union Blacklisting of many workers Long-term formation of many union locals

Parties
United Textile Workers of America	Mill owners National Guard

Number
400,000 Workers	

Casualties and losses
At least 18 deaths At least 162 injured	One mill guard death

The United States textile workers' strike of 1934, colloquially known later as The Uprising of '34 was the largest textile strike in the labor history of the United States, involving 400,000 textile workers from New England, the Mid-Atlantic states and the U.S. Southern states, lasting twenty-two days.

== Background ==
The textile industry, once concentrated in New England with outposts in New Jersey and Philadelphia, had started moving South in the 1880s. By 1933 Southern mills produced more than seventy percent of cotton and woolen textiles in more modern mills, drawing on the pool of dispossessed farmers and laborers willing to work for roughly forty percent less than their Northern counterparts. As was the rest of economic life, the textile industry was strictly segregated and drew only from white workers in the Piedmont. Until 1965, when passage of the Civil Rights Act broke the color line in hiring, less than 2% of textile workers were African American.

Throughout the 1920s, however, the mills faced an intractable problem of overproduction, as the wartime boom for cotton goods ended, while foreign competition cut into their markets. Although manufacturers tried to reduce the oversupply by forming industry associations to regulate competition, their favored solution to the crisis was to squeeze more work out of their employees through what workers called the "stretch-out": speeding up production by increasing the number of looms assigned to each factory hand, limiting break times, paying workers by piece rates, and increasing the number of supervisors to keep workers from slowing down, talking or leaving work.

The stretch-out sparked hundreds of strikes throughout the Southeast: by one count, there were more than eighty strikes in South Carolina in 1929 alone. While most of them were short-lived, these strikes were almost all spontaneous walkouts, without any union – or other – leadership.

That year also saw the massive strikes that began in Gastonia, North Carolina, and Elizabethton, Tennessee, which were violently suppressed by local police and vigilantes. Here again, workers were often more militant than their trade union leadership: to take one striking example, the workers at the Loray Mill in Gastonia walked out under the leadership of the communist-led National Textile Workers Union. The Communist Party founded the NTWU in its short-lived attempt to create revolutionary unions.

In the meantime, the Great Depression made matters worse. The economic collapse drove a number of New England and Mid-Atlantic manufacturers into bankruptcy, while those employers who survived laid off workers and increased the amount and pace of work for their employees even further. Textile workers across the region, from worsted workers in Lawrence, Massachusetts and silk weavers in Paterson, New Jersey, to cotton millhands in Greenville, South Carolina, engaged in hundreds of isolated strikes, even though there were thousands of unemployed workers desperate to take their places.

== Rising hopes under the New Deal ==
The election of Franklin Delano Roosevelt and the passage of the National Industrial Recovery Act (NIRA) appeared to change things. The NIRA, which Roosevelt signed in June 1933, called for cooperation among business, labor and government and established the National Recovery Administration (NRA). It was to oversee the creation of codes of conduct for particular industries that would reduce overproduction, raise wages, control hours of work, guarantee the rights of workers to form unions, and stimulate an economic recovery.

The NIRA rarely, if ever, lived up to its promises: employers usually dominated the panels that created these codes, which often offered far less than what workers and their unions demanded, and the NIRA and the codes themselves were toothless, since the Act did not provide any effective means to enforce the standards.

Even so, the promise of the right to join a union had an electrifying effect on textile workers: the United Textile Workers (UTW), which had no more than 15,000 members in February, 1933, grew to 250,000 members by June 1934, of whom roughly half were cotton mill workers. Textile workers also put tremendous faith in the NIRA to bring an end to the stretch-out, or at least temper its worst features. As one union organizer said, textile workers in the South saw the NIRA as something that "God has sent to them."

The NIRA quickly promulgated a code for the cotton industry regulating workers' hours and establishing a minimum wage; it also established a committee to study the problem of workloads. In the meantime, however, the employers responded to the new minimum wages by increasing the pace of work. When the labor board set a forty-hour work week, mill owners required the same amount of work in those forty hours as they had in the previous fifty- to sixty-hour week.

By August 1934, workers had filed nearly 4,000 complaints to the labor board protesting "code chiseling" by their employers; the board found in favor of only one worker. Union supporters often lost their jobs and found themselves blacklisted throughout the industry. Workers, both north and south, wrote thousands of letters to the White House, the Department of Labor, the NRA, and Eleanor Roosevelt asking for them to intervene.

In what proved to be a dry run of the larger strike to follow, cotton mill workers in South Carolina's Horse Creek Valley struck to force employers to live up to the code, only to face special deputies, highway patrolmen and a machine-gun unit of the National Guard sent to keep the mills open. When the NIRA's special board came to Horse Creek, it did not respond to the workers' complaints, but urged them to return to work. When they attempted to do so, the mill owners not only refused to allow the workers back, but evicted them from company housing. The NIRA took no action to stop the employers from violating the codes.

== First steps toward a national strike ==
When the mill owners made the cotton mill employees' hours larger still further – with the blessing of the NRA – without raising their hourly wage rates in May 1934, the UTW threatened a national strike. This talk was largely bluster; the union had made no preparations for a strike that size. When the NRA promised to give the UTW a seat on the board, balanced by the addition of another industry representative, the UTW canceled the planned strike.

While the UTW called off its plans for a strike, local leaders thought differently. The UTW locals in the northern part of Alabama launched a strike that began on July 18 in Huntsville, then spread to Florence, Anniston, Gadsden, and Birmingham. While the strike was popular, it was also ineffective: many employers welcomed it as a means of cutting their expenses, since they had warehouses full of unsold goods.

In Columbus, Georgia, a city on the Alabama border, the Georgia Webbing and Tape Company had been on strike since July. On August 10, 1934, Reuben Sanders was killed in a scuffle between strikebreakers and strikers. "Eight thousand people viewed Sander's body as it lay in state at the Central Textile Hall in the heart of the city on Sunday, August 12."

The UTW called a special convention in New York City on Monday, August 13, 1934 to address the crisis. The UTW drew up a list of demands for the industry as a whole: a thirty-hour week, minimum wages ranging from $13.00 to $30.00 a week, elimination of the stretch-out, union recognition, and reinstatement of workers fired for their union activities. The delegates, especially those from the southern states, voted overwhelmingly to strike the cotton mills on September 1, 1934, if these demands were not met. They planned to bring out the woolen, silk and rayon workers at a date to be set later.

Mill owners had seen the strike threat as more empty talk from the union. The White House took a largely "hands off" attitude, leaving it to the first National Labor Relations Board to set up a meeting of the parties. The employers refused to meet with the union.

== The strike begins ==
The strike swept through Southern cotton mills, outpacing the union organizers and employing "flying squadrons" which traveled by truck and on foot from mill to mill, calling the workers out. In Gastonia, where authorities had violently suppressed a strike led by the National Textile Workers Union in 1929, an estimated 5,000 people marched in the September 3rd Labor Day parade. The next day union organizers estimated that 20,000 out of the 25,000 textile workers in the county were out on strike.

It is not clear whether the UTW expected to achieve success so quickly in the South. It had only shallow roots and few regular organizers in the region. However, Southern textile workers had considerable experience confronting management through impromptu strikes and other forms of protest, as well as a deep sense of bitterness toward their employers.

Some workers converted their experience into a nearly messianic belief in the power of unionism to take them out of bondage. One union official in North Carolina made the connection in Biblical terms: "The first strike on record was the strike in which Moses led the children of Israel out of Egypt. They too struck against intolerable conditions, and it took them forty years to end that strike."

Textile workers in the North went out on strike in great numbers as well, although they were spread more evenly across different industries and had more diverse grievances than the Southern cotton mill workers. Within a week, almost 400,000 textile workers nationwide had left their jobs and the textile industry was shut down.

Music also played an important role in the strike as radio stations looking for an audience located themselves near mill stations spreading information to workers and giving them a better sense of community. The stations would mainly play music that was popular and well known among the workers.

== Reaction from the authorities ==
The mill owners were initially taken by surprise by the scope of the strike. They immediately took the position that these flying squadrons were, in fact, coercing their employees to go out on strike.

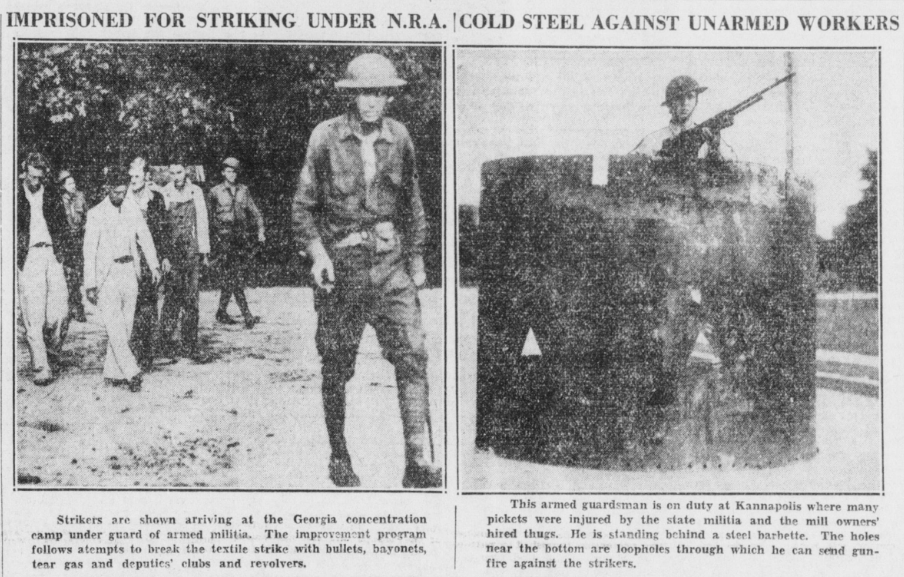
"Imprisoned for Striking Under N.R.A; Cold Steel Against Unarmed Workers" Daily Worker September 22, 1934

Governor Blackwood of South Carolina took up this theme, announcing that he would deputize the state's "mayors, sheriffs, peace officers and every good citizen" to maintain order, then called out the National Guard with orders to shoot to kill any picketers who tried to enter the mills. Governor Ehringhaus of North Carolina followed suit on September 5.

Millowners persuaded local authorities throughout the Piedmont to augment their forces by swearing in special deputies, often their own employees or local residents opposed to the strike; in other cases they simply hired private guards to police the areas around the plant. Violence between guards and picketers broke out almost immediately. The major known incidents include:

- On September 2, a picketer and mill guard died in a shootout in Trion, Georgia
- On September 2, guards killed two picketers in Augusta, Georgia
- On September 3, the Saylesville Massacre was committed by the Rhode Island State Guard. Four picketers were killed and 132 injured.
- On September 6, the Chiquola Mill Massacre saw seven picketers killed and thirty others wounded as they fled the picketline (Honea Path, South Carolina)

Authorities ordered out the National Guard elsewhere in the second week of the strike. Governor Green sent the Guard to Saylesville, Rhode Island after several thousand strikers and sympathizers trapped several hundred strikebreakers in a factory. Governor Green declared martial law in the area on September 11, after picketers armed with rocks, flowerpots and broken headstones from a nearby cemetery battled troops armed with machine guns, in a 36-hour incident that resembled a civic insurrection. Casualty figures vary. A granite marker erected at one of the battle sites names four workers who died in the Saylesville conflict.

Another picketer was shot to death the following day, about five miles away in Woonsocket, Rhode Island, when guardsmen fired into the crowd attempting to storm the Woonsocket Rayon Plant. Governor Green then asked the federal government to send federal troops; the Roosevelt administration ignored the request.

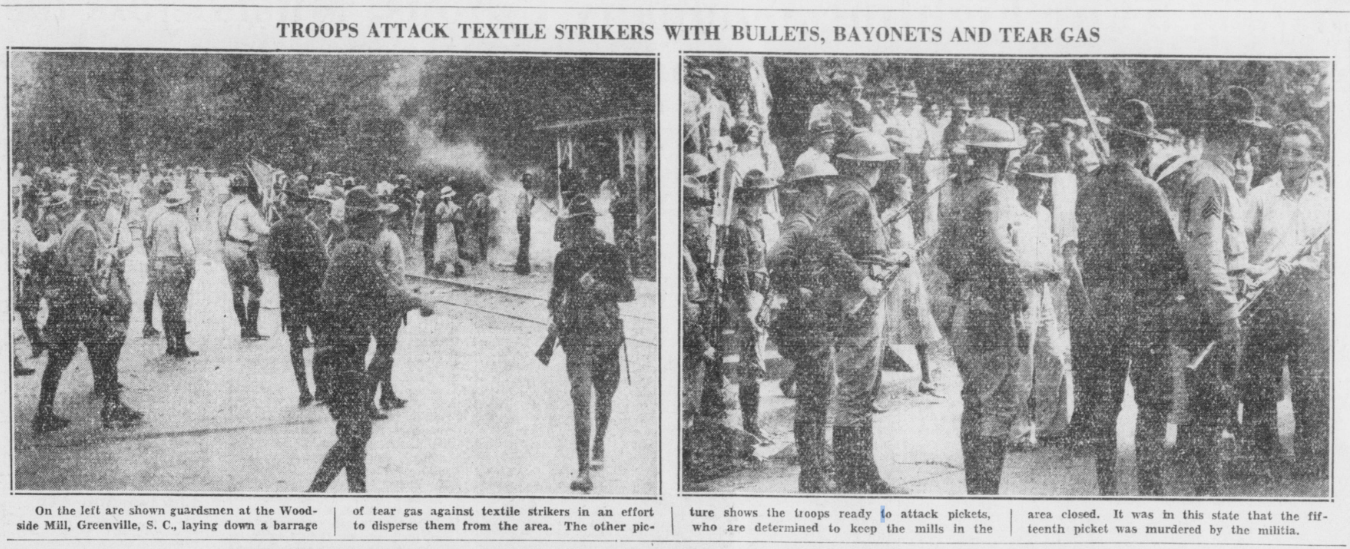
"Troops Attack Textile Strikers with Bullets, Bayonets and Tear Gas" Daily Worker September 22, 1934

Maine deployed the Guard in a more tactical manner, sending them to Augusta and Lewiston to discourage wavering employees from joining the strike. That tactic did not work, however, everywhere: workers at Pepperell Mills' plant in Biddeford and York Manufacturing's plant in Saco went out even though the guard was sent to prevent the arrival of flying squadrons rumored to be coming from New Bedford, Massachusetts.

Governor Wilbur L. Cross of Connecticut also mobilized the Guard, but did not declare martial law. Instead the state labor commissioner met with picketers during the second week of the strike and brought about a reduction in tensions by urging strikers to respect the law and not hurl epithets at strikebreakers.

Things were different in Georgia, where Governor Eugene Talmadge declared martial law in the third week of the strike and directed the National Guard to arrest all picketers throughout the state, holding them in a former World War I prisoner of war camp for trial by a military tribunal. While the state only interned a hundred or so picketers, the show of force effectively ended picketing throughout most of the state.

== End of the strike ==
The strike was, in fact, already falling apart, particularly in the South, where local government refused to provide any relief assistance to strikers and there were few sympathetic churches or unions to provide support. Although the union had pledged before the walkout began to feed strikers, it was wholly unable to fulfill this promise. While roughly half of the textile workers in North and South Carolina and roughly three fourths in Georgia were on strike at this point, with similar figures in Massachusetts and Rhode Island, workers had started to drift back to work and struck plants were reopening, if with only skeleton crews.

At that point the mediation board that Roosevelt had appointed in the first week of the strike issued its report. As was typical of federal commissions of this era, the board temporized, urging further studies of the economic plight of the employers and the effects of the stretch-out on their employees. It urged the President to create a new Textile Labor Relations Board to hear workers' complaints and urged employers not to discriminate against strikers.

Roosevelt announced his support for the report, then urged employees to return to work and the manufacturers to accept the commission's recommendations. The UTW took the opportunity to declare victory and held a number of parades to celebrate the end of the strike.

The strike was a total defeat for the union, particularly in the South. The union had not forced the mill owners to recognize it or obtained any of its economic demands. The employers refused to reinstate strikers throughout the South, while the Cotton Textile National Industrial Relations Board never ceded any authority to any other board. Thousands of strikers never returned to work in the mills.

== Aftermath ==
In March 1935, approximately 2,000 textile workers at Callaway Mills went on strike in LaGrange, Georgia, and martial law was declared in the city. At least one striker was killed by National Guardsmen as the soldiers evicted families from mill-owned homes. Some consider the 1935 strike in LaGrange to be the last throes of the General Textile Strike. Ironically, President Roosevelt was a friend and frequent visitor of Cason Callaway, President of Callaway Mills at the time.

The strike represented the high point for union hopes of organizing textile workers in the South for the next several decades. When the CIO formed the Textile Workers Organizing Committee (TWOC) three years later, TWOC focused on northern manufacturers outside the cotton industry. TWOC's successor, the Textile Workers Union of America, faced similar problems organizing in the South; the CIO's postwar organizing drive in the South fell apart chiefly because of its inability to organize textile workers there.

The union might have escaped this disaster if it had characterized the strike as a first step, rather than attempting to pass it off as a victory. That, however, would have required that the union also devote the resources necessary to follow up with renewed, systematic organizing efforts in the immediate aftermath of the strike, instead of concerning itself with the futile effort to win reinstatement for discharged strikers through the Textile Labor Board. The memory of blacklisting and defeat soured many Southern textile workers on unions for decades.

The 1934 defeat was less cataclysmic in the North, in that the strike was in fact, a number of separate events, commencing at different times in separate industries and in furtherance of local goals. Northern employers were not as ruthless in blacklisting workers and the TWOC made some headway in organizing these plants in the years that followed. Those victories were impermanent, however, as much of northern industry either went South or went bankrupt in the years that followed.

Anti-union sentiment in the South kept wages low for decades, but also acted as a catalyst for development later when industries moved there from the North and Midwest because of lower costs. Employers resisted integrating textile mills; when they were forced to do so by the Civil Rights Act of 1964, researchers found that African Americans were accepted overall by other employees, although they continued to face discrimination in job training and advancement. By the time this occurred, many jobs in the textile industry were already moving overseas, a trend that accelerated in the 1980s.

== See also ==
- List of US strikes by size
- Murder of workers in labor disputes in the United States
- United Textile Workers of America
- 1934 West Coast waterfront strike
- New England Textile Strike of 1922
