= United Textile Workers of America =

Defunct trade union

UTW
- Successor: TWUA & UFCW
- Founded: 1901
- Dissolved: 1939; 1996
- Location: United States of America

The United Textile Workers of America (UTW) was a North American trade union established in 1901.

== History ==
The United Textile Workers of America was founded following two conferences in 1901 under the aegis of the American Federation of Labor (AFL) as an amalgamation of several smaller craft unions. AFL first vice president James Duncan presided over a two-day initial conference held at Boston's Quincy House Hotel in May before a larger conference finalized the organization in November. The union's most important early leader was John Golden, a Lancashire-born spinner from Fall River, Massachusetts. Golden was elected as the union's second president in 1902 and re-elected at each subsequent convention until his death in 1921. At the time of his election, UTW's membership was just 10,600 spread out among 185 local unions.

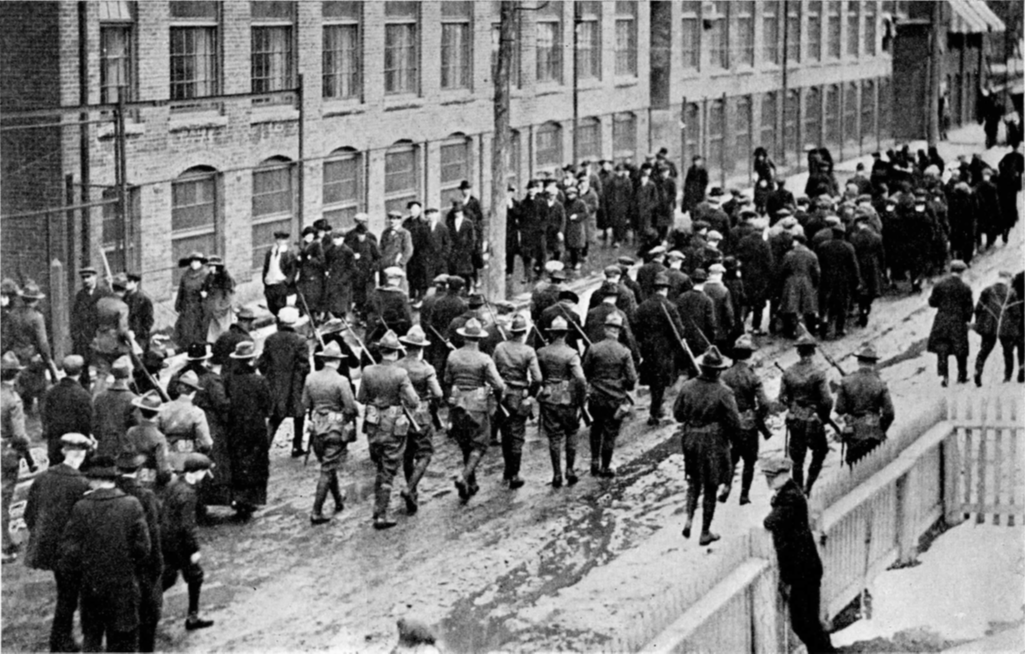
Militia in Pawtucket, Rhode Island in response to the 1922 New England Textile Strike.

During the 1900s & 1910s, UTW engaged in intense competition with the Industrial Workers of the World (IWW) for the allegiance of textile workers across the northeastern United States. Generally opposed to strikes as a means of solving industrial disputes, the UTW frequently collaborated with company officials and sent union members to act as strikebreakers to IWW-led strikes, including the 1907 Skowhegan textile strike, the 1912 Lawrence textile strike, the 1913 Hazleton silk strike and the 1913 Paterson silk strike. As such, it had limited success prior to the 1930s, and the union claimed about 350,000 members at the time of a general textile strike in 1934. A year later in 1935, it became a founding member of the Committee for Industrial Organizations, whose Textile Workers Organizing Committee established the basis for a new union, the Textile Workers Union of America, founded in 1939. A diminished UTW continued separately after 1939 and, in 1996, merged with the United Food and Commercial Workers International Union.

In 1922, the UTW was one of the leaders of the 1922 New England Textile Strike. Occurring primarily in Massachusetts, New Hampshire, and Rhode Island, the strike involved 40,000–50,000 workers who refused to work for approximately 200 days. This was alongside the IWW & ACTWU. Leadership of the strike was divided; the UTW & ACTWU led in Rhode Island whereas the IWW, ACTWU, and UTW were at the helm in Massachusetts. The UTW completely led it in New Hampshire.

== Publications ==
From its founding in 1901 until 1912, UTW used the privately published The Laborer and Journeyman as its official organ. In 1912, The Textile Worker was founded and published by the union itself with secretary-treasurer Albert Hibbert as its editor. In September 1915, John Golden took over as editor on top of his other duties as president. He was replaced in both roles following his death by Thomas F. McMahon.

== Leadership ==
=== Presidents ===
1901: James Tansey
1902: John Golden
1921: Thomas F. McMahon
1937: Frank Gorman
1939: C. M. Fox
1941: Frank Gorman
1944: Anthony Valente
1958: George Baldanzi
1972: Francis Schaufenbil
1986: Vernon Mustard
1991: Ron Myslowka

=== Other leaders ===
- Sara Agnes Mclaughlin Conboy, secretary-treasurer
- Horace Riviere, Head of the New England district

== See also ==
- 1914–1915 Fulton Bag and Cotton Mills strike
- Textile workers strike (1934)
