= Boone House =

Boone House may refer to:

- Boone House (Little Rock, Arkansas), listed on the National Register of Historic Places (NRHP)
- Boone-Murphy House, Pine Bluff, AR, listed on the NRHP in Arkansas
- Boone House (St. Petersburg, Florida), NRHP-listed
- Daniel Boone House, Defiance, MO, listed on the NRHP in Missouri
- John W. Boone House, Columbia, MO, listed on the NRHP in Missouri
- Nathan Boone House, Ash Grove, MO, listed on the NRHP in Missouri
- Boone-Withers House, Waynesville, NC, listed on the NRHP in North Carolina
- Daniel Boone Homestead Site and Bertolet Cabin, Birdsboro, PA, NRHP-listed
- Boone Hall Plantation House and Historic Landscape, Mount Pleasant, SC, listed on the NRHP in South Carolina
- Boone-Douthit House, Pendleton, SC, NRHP-listed
