= J. C. Stribling Barn =

- Stribling, J.C., Barn
- U.S. National Register of Historic Places
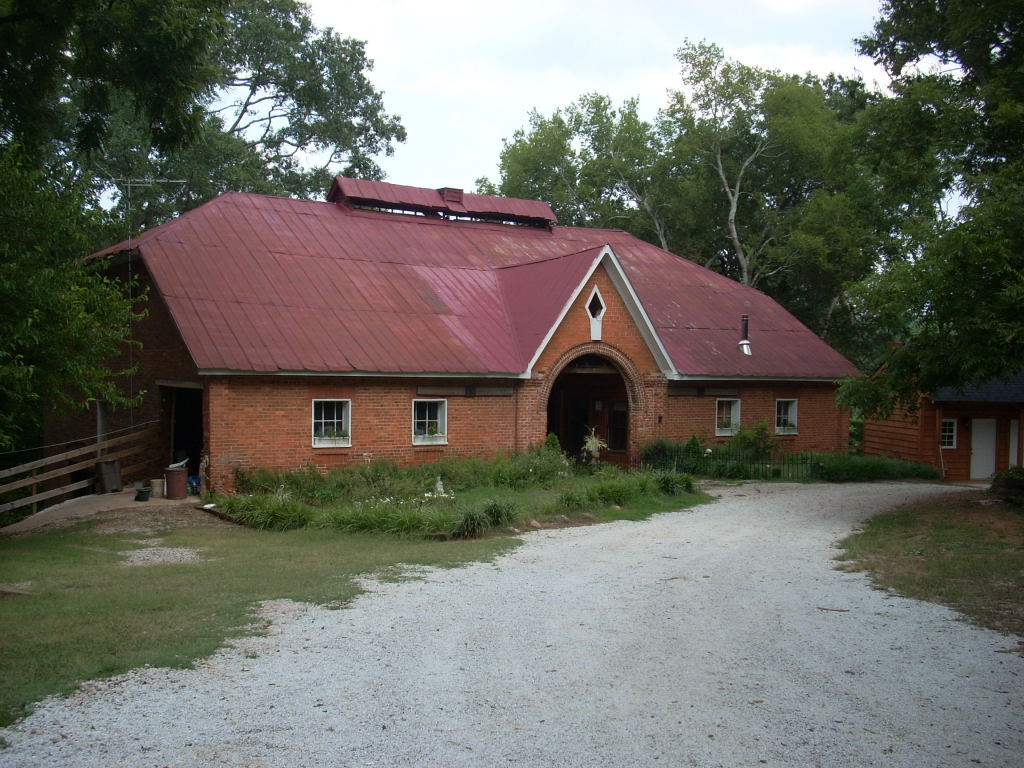
- Stribling Barn at Sleepy Hollow

- Location within South Carolina Location within the United States
- Location: 220 Issaqueena Tr., Clemson, South Carolina
- Coordinates: 34°40′6″N 82°47′44″W
- Area: less than one acre
- Architectural style: Late Victorian
- NRHP reference No.: 01001161
- Added to NRHP: October 22, 2001

The J. C. Stribling Barn is a brick barn built ca. 1890 to 1900 at 220 Isaqueena Trail in Clemson, South Carolina. It is also known as the Sleepy Hollow Barn or the Stribling-Boone Barn. It was named to the National Register of Historic Places on October 22, 2001.

== History ==
Jesse Cornelius Stribling (1844–1927) was a private in the Confederate Army. He served with the 1st South Carolina Rifles (Orr's Rifles) and the Rutledge Mounted Riflemen. After the war, he married Virginia Eliza Hunter (1847–1934). During the violent Reconstruction period, Stribling was an officer in the Red Shirts, a group dedicated to returning native Southerners to leadership positions in government. He was a progressive farmer. Along with W.D. Warren of nearby Ashtabula, Stribling brought Jersey cattle into South Carolina in 1873. He also introduced Percheron horses into the state. He was the president of the Pendleton Farmers' Society from 1908 until he died in 1927.

Sleepy Hollow is the name for a farm between Clemson and Pendleton. The house was originally built in 1837 to replace a log cabin. Sleepy Hollow was sold to Virginia Stribling in 1887. The Stribling family lived at Sleepy Hollow until 1930. In 1890, the original barn and other out buildings were lost and the house was damaged in a fire. The house was repaired and a new barn was built.

Sleepy Hollow is now a bed and breakfast. The grounds are rented for weddings and other events.

== Architecture ==
The barn is a three-story, brick bank barn. Bank barns are less common in the Southeastern United States than in New England or the Midwest. Its brick construction is considered unusual for South Carolina barns. This was built after the fire that destroyed the plantation's outbuildings around 1890. It was built as early as 1890 or as late as about 1900.

The barn has a stone foundation. The barn is 70 ft (21 m) long and 50 ft (15 m) wide. Its hand-made, native bricks were fired in a kiln on the plantation. Mud mortar was used to lay the bricks in six to one common bond.

The barn has a jerkin head, V-crimp metal roof that is supported by eight square wooden piers and timber trusses. There is a clerestory, center ridge vent for light and ventilation. A base, which may have been for a cupola, is in the center of the ridge vent.

The main entrance is in the center of the west elevation at the second level of the barn. It is an arched entry with brick pilasters. There is a wooden keystone and a lozenge-shaped vent above the arch. There are metal-track sliding, lattice doors on the north and south elevations on the first and second levels. Two lozenge-shaped vents are on north and south elevations near the jerkin-head roofline. There are fourteen windows with a six-light wooden sash.

The first level was for fifty Jersey cows while the second level was for the horses. The latter had four trap doors that served as hay chutes for the cattle. The third level was for storage and included platforms at each end of the barn for drying seeds.

To use the barn for recreation, the central section of the third level and the drying platforms were removed and overhead lighting was installed. A new wooden floor was put on the second level and concrete was poured over the dirt floor at the entrance. Also a concrete retaining wall about 2.5 ft (0.8 m) was put along the rear foundation.

Additional pictures of the barn are available.
