= Jane Edna Hunter =

African-American social worker (1882–1971)

- Born: Jane Edna Harris; December 13, 1882; Pendleton, South Carolina
- Died: January 19, 1971 (aged 88); Cleveland, Ohio
- Citizenship: United States of America
- Education: Baldwin-Wallace College; Cleveland State University College of Law
- Occupation: Social work
- Employer: Phillis Wheatley Association
- Known for: Work for African-American children and families
- Board member of: NAACP
- Spouse: Edward Hunter
- Parent(s): Edward Harris; Harriet Milner

Jane Edna Hunter (December 13, 1882 – January 13, 1971), an African-American social worker, Hunter was born on the Woodburn Plantation near Pendleton, South Carolina. She was involved in the NAACP and NAACW. Jane Edna Hunter is widely known for her work in 1911 when she established the Working Girls Association in Cleveland, Ohio, which later became the Phillis Wheatley Association of Cleveland.

== Life ==
Jane Edna Hunter's parents were wage earners on mainly the Woodburn Plantation Farm working as sharecroppers, but tended to move around plantations trying to find better wages. After her father died in 1892, she did housework for local families. She began school at the age of 14, attending the Ferguson and Williams Academy in Abbeville, South Carolina. She graduated with an eighth-grade education in 1900. She returned to work as a domestic.

She was briefly married to Edward Hunter, who was about 40 years her senior. She moved to Charleston, South Carolina. She began nursing training at the Cannon Street Hospital and Training School for Nurses. In 1904, she completed one year of training at the Hampton Institute in Virginia.

She moved to Cleveland, Ohio, in 1905. In 1911, she founded the Working Girls Association to offer shelter, assistance and education to women. The Phillis Wheatley Home was opened in 1911 with 23 rooms; Hunter worked with leaders within the community to expand the size and service of the facility. In 1912, the Phillis Wheatley Home became the Phillis Wheatley Association of Cleveland, named in honor of the African-American poet Phillis Wheatley.

In 1925, Hunter graduated from the Cleveland State University College of Law, which was then affiliated with Baldwin-Wallace College and was admitted to the Ohio Bar.

Hunter oversaw the construction of an eleven-story residence for black women, completed in 1927, that had a beauty school, dining facilities, nursery school and the Booker T. Washington playground.

She had invested in Cleveland real estate and was active in the National Association of Colored Women. She also served as a trustee of Ohio's Central State University. In 1937 Hunter was awarded the NAACP's Spingarn Medal for her outstanding achievements within the community.

She wrote an autobiographical book entitled A Nickel and Prayer, which was published in 1940. She served as executive director of the Phillis Wheatley Association of Cleveland until she retired in 1947.

She held honorary degrees from Allen University, Fisk University, Central State University and Tuskegee Institute. She was on the board of directors and was a vice president of the National Association for the Advancement of Colored People.

Her health failed in the mid-1950s. She lived in a nursing home from the early 1960s until her death on January 13, 1971, in Cleveland. The cause of death was never publicly disclosed. She is buried in Lake View Cemetery in Cleveland, Ohio.

== Education ==
In 1900 Jane Edna Hunter graduated from the Ferguson and Williams Academy in Abbeville, South Carolina at the age of 14. She enrolled in nursing training at Cannon Street Hospital and Training School for Nurses. She also completed one year of training at the Hampton Institute in Virginia in 1904. She attended and graduated from Cleveland State University College of Law, where she was admitted to practice law in Ohio in 1925.

== Legacy ==
The Cuyahoga County Department of Children and Family Services Agency named its principal building the Jane Edna Hunter Social Services Center to honor her work with children and families. The Jane Edna Hunter Museum is at the Phillis Wheatley Center in Cleveland.

Jane Edna Hunter: a case study of Black leadership is a book about her life. Jane Edna Hunter was born Jane Harris in 1882. She was a fair complexion woman, because her father was born to a slave and a Caucasian overseer. As a young girl growing up Hunter felt that her lighter complexion made her greater than her dark skin mother, family friends, and friends. It was not until her teenage years that Hunter started to embrace being a black woman. After receiving training as a nurse at several nursing schools, Hunter moved to Cleveland Ohio, where she was confronted with racism, in not being able to find a job in nursing, or housing accommodation at the local YWCA. The YWCA, like many other foundations, refused to house Negro women migrating from the South. Jane Edna Hunter decided to try to convince the white woman who was running the YWCA to establish a separate foundation for black women. However many of the older Negro women were opposed, feeling that Hunter was starting self-segregation, which then prompted Jane Edna Hunter with "A Nickel and a Prayer" to establish the Phillis Wheatley Association. That functioned as an employment agency and a summer camp to help elevate African-American women and children. The Phillis Wheatley Association is still active and continues to help employ Black women and children. She was a member of Alpha Kappa Alpha sorority.

Hunter's image was included in the 1945 painting Women Builders by William H. Johnson as part of his Fighters for Freedom series.

== Achievements ==
Jane Edna Hunter was a social workers and philanthropist who made significant contributions to the Black community. Some of her accomplishments include:

1. Jane Edna Hunter established and founded the Phillis Wheatley Association in 1911. Through this foundation she was able to provide job opportunity and uplift the Black women in the community.
2. In addition to the Phillis Wheatley Association, Hunter also opened a residence to house women and children.
3. Hunter was an activist for African American women and participated in acts to improve their social and economic status in order to achieve jobs.
4. Hunter created a training program for domestic workers in hopes of improving their skills to earn larger wages.
5. Hunter was a board member for the NAACP in the 1920s and 1930s, working to improve civil rights for African Americans.
6. In the 1940s Hunter helped establish a school for African American children in Virginia.
7. Hunter was the first African American woman to receive the NAACP award of the Spingarn Medal, in 1928.

== Memoir ==
=== A Nickel and a Prayer ===
Jane Edna Hunter wrote A Nickel and a Prayer, a memoir. In it, Hunter demonstrates the obstacles she had to overcome while sharing her beliefs that everyone deserves a chance, respect, equity and the opportunity to succeed. Along with this mindset, Hunter explains that she wants to help others achieve their success through the Phillis Wheatley Association. In the book, Hunter emphasizes the need for community support. The Phillis Wheatley Association was a community effort with many donors and volunteers. Although Hunter describes her struggle with her light skin tone in her family, she became fond of it until she moved and experienced racism when trying to get a job. Hunter wanted to stop the systemic injustices harming Black women, so she also mentions her work with young Black women who were often in trouble with the law.

Hunter describes that the motivation to keep pushing forward came from her faith. She describes her work within the Phillis Wheatley Association as a 'work of god'. She describes her faith as what gave her the strength and guidance she relied on to help her community.

In A Nickel and a Prayer, Hunter describes black women's struggles in the early 20th century. She highlights how prayer and faith, along with community and support, allowed her to overcome the challenges she faced and open the Phillis Wheatley Association.
