= Holcha Krake =

Danish artist (1885–1944)

- Born: Holcha Sørensen; April 6, 1885; Karlby Sogn, Denmark
- Died: January 13, 1944 (aged 58); New York, New York, United States
- Known for: Textile artist
- Spouse: William H. Johnson (m. 1930)

Holcha Krake (6 April 1885–13 January 1944) was a Danish born textile artist, ceramist, watercolorist, and the wife of the Harlem Renaissance artist William H. Johnson. Her style is characterized by a blend of Nordic folk art and modernism.

Krake began her career as art weaver, having trained in weaving at Askov Højskole and the Manufacture des Gobelins. She began working in ceramics following a highly influential trip to Tunisia in 1932. Although she had previously produced watercolor paintings, her work as a painter was in turn influenced by her travels in Norway.

== Early life ==
Holcha Sørensen was born on 6 April 1885, in Karlby Sogn, Denmark to Thora Michaeline Christine Michelsen and Søren Martin Sørensen. She had three younger siblings: Niels Hagbard Sørensen (1886–1934), Nanna Sørensen (1889–1968), and Erna Sørensen (1897–1924). In 1891, her family moved to Hindsholm where her father worked as a teacher. Her father died unexpectedly in 1910, leaving her mother to support the family. The grieving family decided to change their surname form Sørensen to Krake, after the legendary Danish king, Rolf Krake.

== Career ==
In 1908, she began a teaching course at Askov Højskole. While there, she took up an interest in art weaving while studying with Jenny la Cour. After leaving Askov in 1910, she eventually enrolled in la Cour's Weaving School in Copenhagen, where she studied under Anton Rosen. During the following decade, Krake studied across Europe through scholarships, spending particular time in Lund, Oslo, Hämeenlinna, Berlin, Dresden, and Paris, where she studied at the Manufacture des Gobelins. In 1920, she became the co-director of the Askov Textile School along with Gerda Michelsen.

Between 1928 and 1929, Krake was traveling in the south of France with her sister, Erna, and brother in law, Christoph Voll. She met William H. Johnson in Cagnes-sur-Mer while traveling and he returned to visit Denmark with her. Though he soon returned to the United States, he came back to Denmark in 1930 and he and Krake were married on 4 June 1930. Krake's family was not overly acceptant of their interracial marriage, and their prenuptial agreement only listed her assets.

She and her husband settled in Kerteminde where they established themselves as artists and arranged joint exhibitions. She actively promoted her husbands work, arranging exhibitions and interacting with the press. In April 1932, they travelled to Tunisia together, spending time in Germany, the Netherlands, Belgium, and France, before departing from the port in Marseille. During their 3 month trip in Tunisia, they spent significant time in Tunis, Nabeul, and Kairouan. Krake's work was greatly influenced by Tunisian ceramics and tiles. Immediately following the trip, she exhibited ceramic work for the first time which drew heavily on ceramic techniques, colors, and patterns she had observed in Tunisia.

In 1935, Krake and Johnson began traveling through Norway. While there, she began painting in watercolor and oil, focusing particularly on floral motifs. They returned briefly to Denmark in 1938, before moving to New York City to escape the growing threat of Nazi Germany. She and Johnson eventually settled near Greenwich Village, where Krake was known to host dinner parties. She exhibited her tapestries at the 1939 World's Fair as part of the Danish Pavilion. Krake died of breast cancer in New York City on 13 January 1944. Some her work is in the collection of the Smithsonian American Art Museum. In 2019 the Florence County Museum in Florence, South Carolina held an exhibition of the couple's work called Willie and Holcha.

== Gallery ==
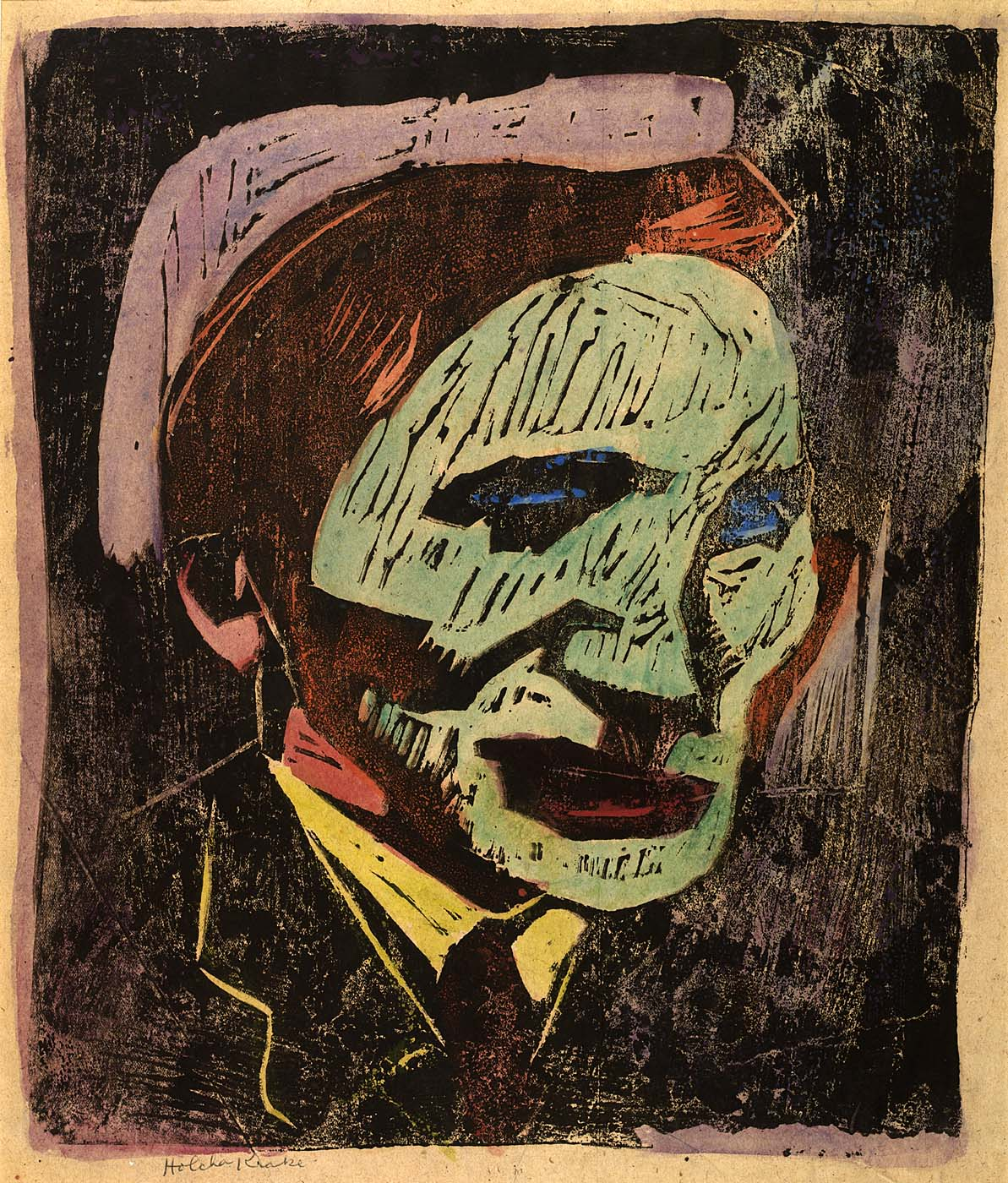
Holcha Krake by William H. Johnson, hand colored woodcut on paper, c.1930–1935

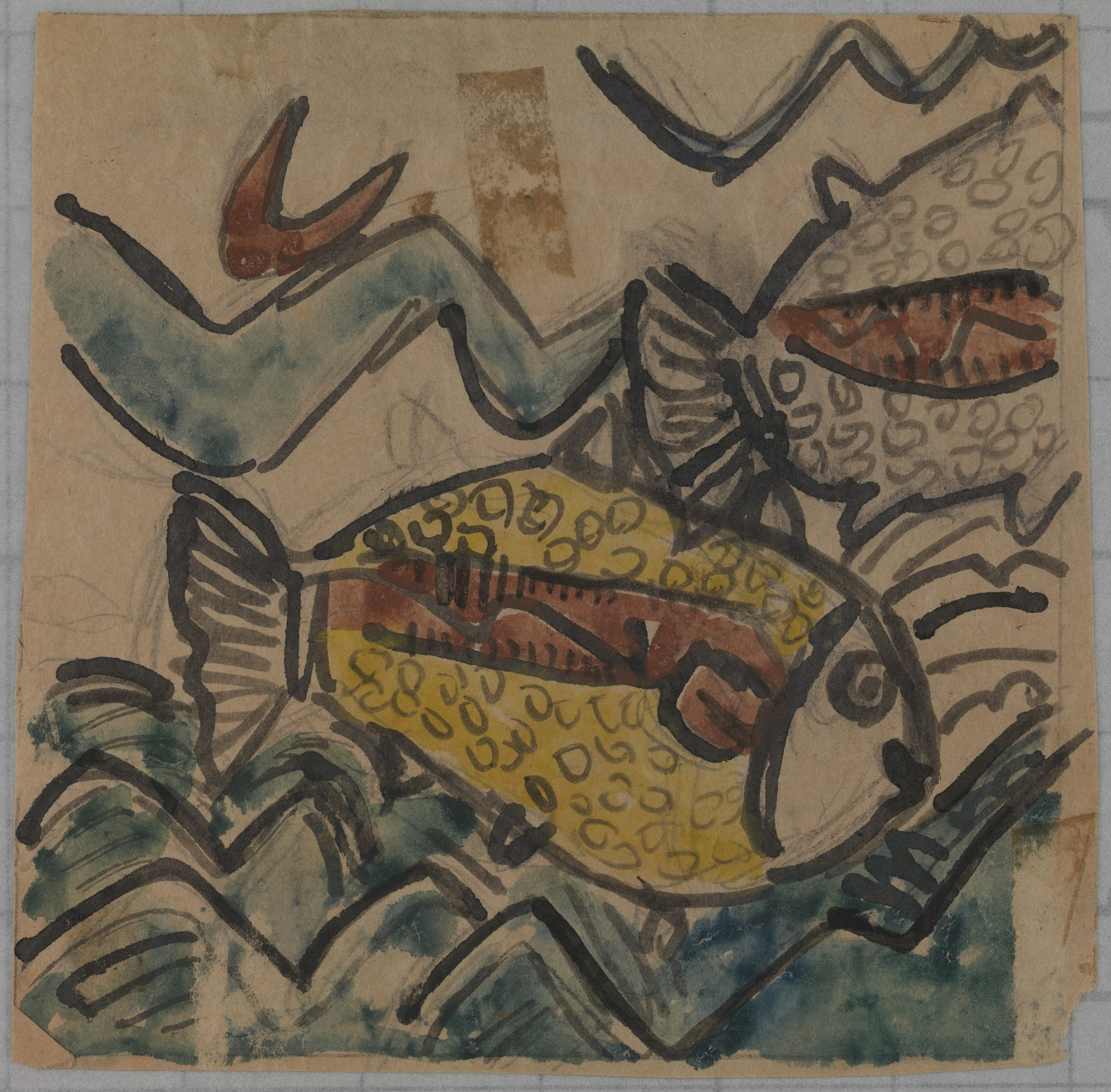
Fish Design for a Ceramic Plate by Holcha Krake, watercolor on paper, c.1930–1939

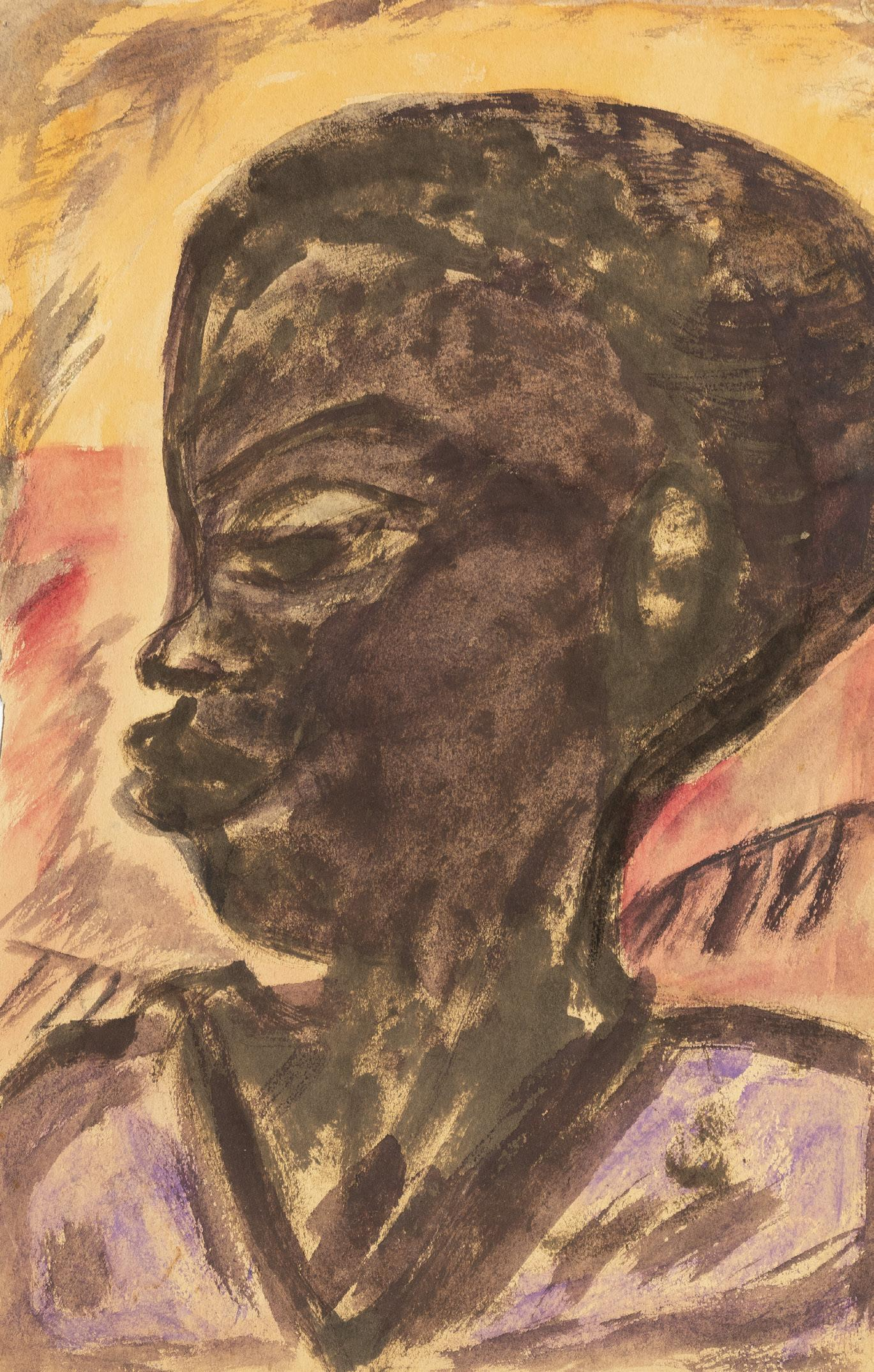
Portrait of a boy by Holcha Krake, c.1932

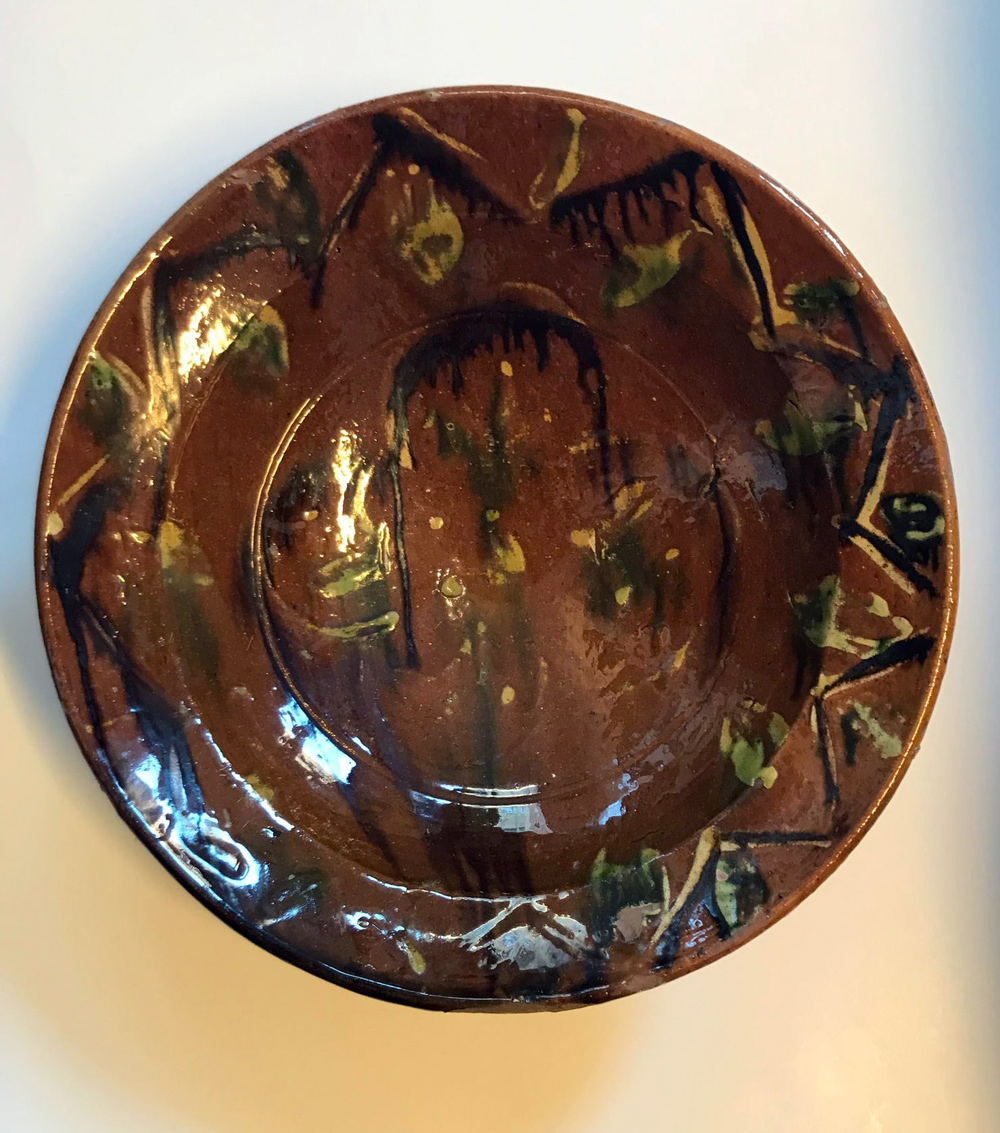
Splash glazed dish with tribal Berber patterns by Holcha Krake, c.1932–1938

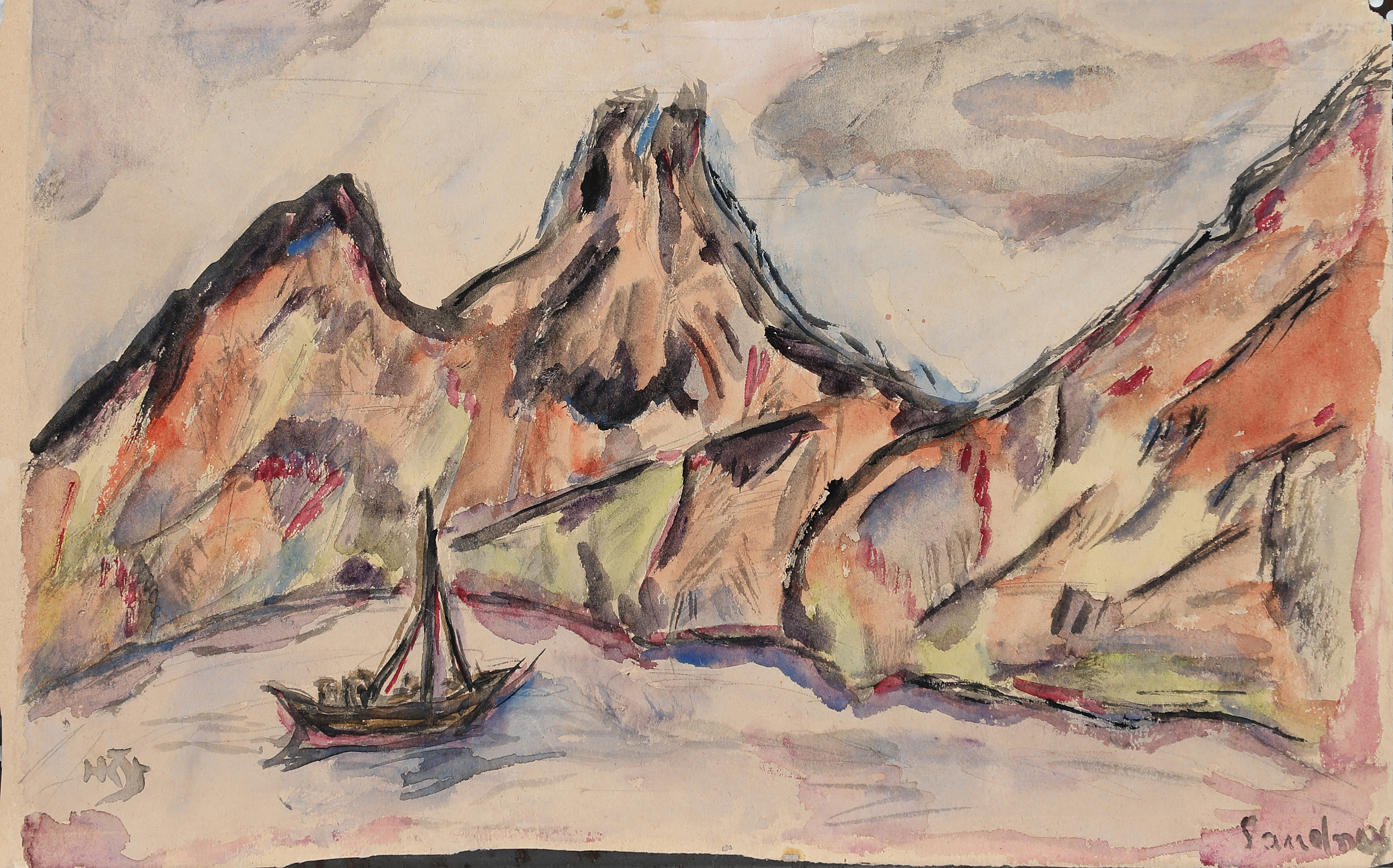
Landskab fra Sandøy, Norge by Holcha Krake, watercolor on paper, c.1935–1937
