= Women Builders (painting) =

1945 painting by William H. Johnson

- Artist: William H. Johnson
- Year: 1945
- Medium: oil on paperboard
- Dimensions: 95.7 cm × 86.7 cm (37 5/8 1/4 in × 34 1/8 in)
- Location: Smithsonian American Art Museum, Washington, DC

Women Builders is a painting by American artist William H. Johnson. Johnson painted it in 1945 as part of his Fighters for Freedom series.

Johnson was inspired by the 1931 book Women Builders written by Sadie lola Daniel and illustrated by Hallie Q. Brown. The children's book contains biographies of Black women who Daniel considered pioneers in education, finance, and social institutions. Included in the painting are images of the seven subjects of the book as well as a portrait of the author, Sadie lola Daniel.

Depicted are:

- Janie Porter Barrett
- Mary McLeod Bethune
- Charlotte Hawkins Brown
- Nannie Helen Burroughs
- Sadie lola Daniel
- Jane Edna Hunter
- Lucy Craft Laney
- Maggie Lena Walker

The oil on paperboard painting is in the collection of the Smithsonian American Art Museum (SAAM). It was donated to SAAM by the Harmon Foundation in 1967. It was included in the traveling exhibition Fighters for Freedom: William H. Johnson Picturing Justice.
