= Pendleton Historic District (Pendleton, South Carolina) =

Historic district in South Carolina, United States

- U.S. National Register of Historic Places
- U.S. Historic district
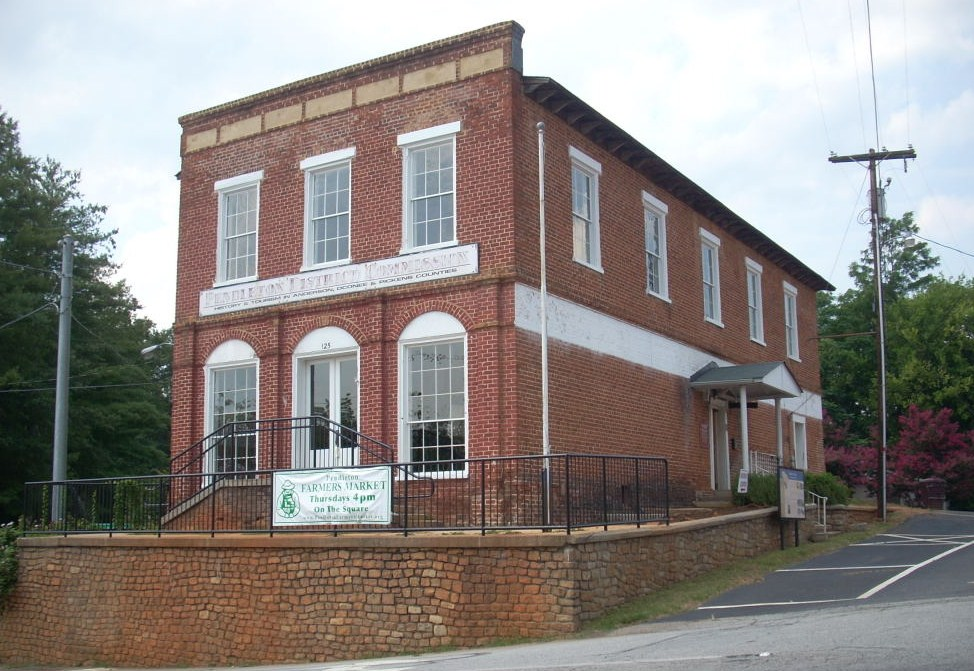
- Hunter's Store Hall, Pendleton, South Carolina

- Location within South Carolina Location within the United States
- Location: Bounded on W by Hopewell and Treaty Oak, N by Old Stone Church, E by Montpelier, and S by town limits, Pendleton, South Carolina
- Coordinates: 34°39′4″N 82°47′1″W
- Area: 6,316 acres (2,556 ha)
- Built: 1789
- Architectural style: Greek Revival
- NRHP reference No.: 70000560
- Added to NRHP: August 25, 1970

Pendleton Historic District in Pendleton, South Carolina is a historic district which is located mostly in Anderson County, South Carolina and partly in Pickens County, South Carolina. The district was listed on the National Register of Historic Places in 1970. The historic district includes the town of Pendleton and its immediate surroundings plus a large tract west towards Lake Hartwell to include the Hopewell Keowee Monument and the Treaty Oak Monument. The entire historic district covers an area of over 6,300 acres (25 km^{2}).

It includes Woodburn, Ashtabula, and Old Stone Church and Cemetery, which are listed individually on the National Register.
