= Margaret Sellers Walker =

American city and state official (1935–2020)

- Born: Margaret Elizabeth Regular; September 28, 1935; Pendleton, South Carolina
- Died: September 20, 2020 (aged 84); Jacksonville, Florida
- Other names: Margaret Sellers Walker Morris (married name, at time of death)
- Occupations: City and state official, college professor

Margaret Sellers Walker Morris (September 28, 1935 – September 20, 2020), born Margaret Elizabeth Regular, was an American city and state official, based in Michigan. She was also a professor at Grand Valley State University. She was inducted into the Michigan Women's Hall of Fame in 2005.

== Early life ==
Margaret Elizabeth Regular was born in 1935, in Pendleton, South Carolina, the daughter of Daniel and Annie Regular. She moved to Detroit with her family in 1945; her father worked in the automobile industry there. She attended Wayne State University before she married in 1951, and later earned her bachelor's degree there in the 1960s. In 1983, she earned a master's degree in public administration at Western Michigan University.

== Career ==
Walker worked at the Detroit Public Library early in her career, and was director of personnel when she left in 1977. She was director of personnel at Wayne County Community College from 1977 to 1980. In 1980, Walker became "the first woman and the first African-American to head a division of the Michigan Department of Natural Resources", when she became head of personnel. In 1986, she became director of human resources for the city of Grand Rapids, and later became Assistant City Manager.

Walker was on the faculty of Grand Valley State University from 1993 until 2002, and was associate director of the university's Dorothy A. Johnson Center for Philanthropy and Nonprofit Leadership. She was honored by the Michigan Women's Foundation in 2001. In 2005, she was inducted into the Michigan Women's Hall of Fame. In 2006, she was elected president of the Board of Trustees of the Grand Rapids Community Foundation. She appeared in a documentary about local philanthropy, The Gift of All: A Community of Givers (2008) by Daniel Garcia.

Walker was president of the International Public Management Association for Human Resources (IPMA-HR), and received the professional organization's Warner W. Stockberger Achievement Award in 1996, for her decades of service in the personnel field. She was named a "Pioneering Member" of the Alpha Kappa Alpha black sorority.

== Personal life ==
Margaret Regular married Thomas James Sellers Jr. in 1953. They had two daughters, Loren and Sharon. She was married twice more, to James G. Walker and to Alford Morris. Margaret Sellers Walker Morris died in 2020, aged 84 years, in Jacksonville, Florida.
