= Ashtabula (Pendleton, South Carolina) =

Historic house in South Carolina, United States

- U.S. National Register of Historic Places
- U.S. Historic district
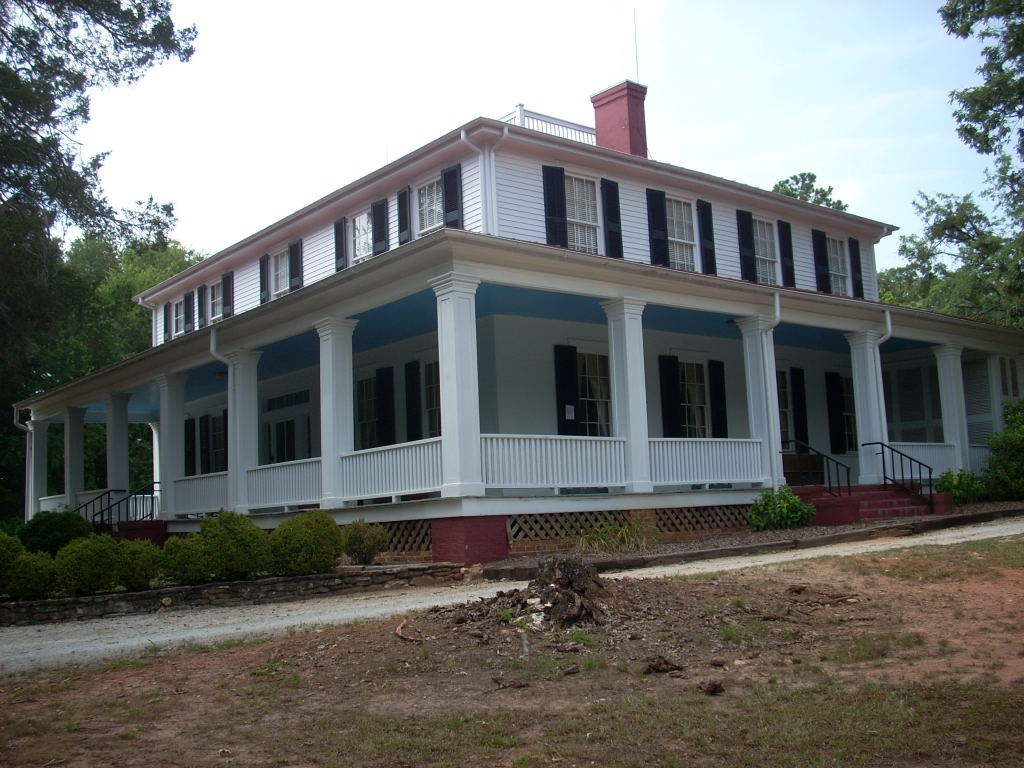
- Ashtabula in 2009

- Location within South Carolina Location within the United States
- Location: 2725 Old Greenville Highway; Central, South Carolina 29630
- Nearest city: Pendleton, South Carolina
- Coordinates: 34°40′44″N 82°45′25″W
- Area: less than one acre
- Built: 1828
- Architectural style: Central Hall, Double-pile
- Part of: Pendleton Historic District (ID70000560)
- NRHP reference No.: 72001186
- Added to NRHP: March 23, 1972

Ashtabula is a plantation house at 2725 Old Greenville Highway near Pendleton in Anderson County, South Carolina, USA. It has been also known as the Gibbes-Broyles-Latta-Pelzer House or some combination of one or more of these names. It was named in the National Register of Historic Places as a historic district on March 23, 1972. It is considered a significant example of a Lowcountry style plantation house built for a Charleston family in the Upstate in the early 19th century. It also is part of the Pendleton Historic District.

== History ==
Around 1790, Thomas Lofton built a two-story, brick house at the site. Later, the Gassaway family owned the house, which they operated as a tavern on the stage road from Pendleton to Pickensville and Greenville.

In the mid-1820s, Lewis Ladson Gibbes from Charleston built the frame house now known as Ashtabula. His spouse was Maria Drayton of Drayton Hall and a niece of Arthur Middleton. She died in 1826 and he died in 1828 just before the completion of the house. Some of their children lived in the house.

It was sold to Dr. Ozey R. Broyles in 1837. Broyles had an interest in agricultural and invented a subsurface plow. In 1845, the plantation set the "world's record for rice" production of 110 bushels per acre with each bushel weighing 43.75 lb (19.8 kg). During this period, the average production in South Carolina was of the order of 40 bushels per acre.

In 1851, the plantation was sold to James Latta. He imported some of the first Hereford cattle from England to improve the cattle stock. At the beginning of the Civil War, Robert Adger of Charleston purchased the house for his daughter Clarissa and her husband O. A. Bowen. Clarissa kept a detailed diary of life on the plantation that was published in 1973.

Sarah E. Adger, daughter of Robert Adger, and her husband William D. Warner developed a dairy farm managed by a neighbor, J. C. Stribling. They brought the first Jersey cattle into South Carolina.

In 1880, Francis J. Pelzer, who built Pelzer Manufacturing Company, purchased the property. It was later owned by a number of South Carolinians. The last private owner was Frederick W. Symmes of Greenville. He owned it from 1940 to 1957.

It was then purchased by Mead Paper Company. They gave the house to the Foundation for the Historic Restoration in the Pendleton Area in 1961. The Foundation's name was changed to the Pendleton Historic Foundation in the 1990s.

Ashtabula is now a house museum run by the Pendleton Historic Foundation. The house is furnished with antebellum furniture. It is open Tuesday through Friday and Sunday afternoons from April to October.

== Architecture ==
The house is a two-story, nearly square, frame structure that is four bays wide. The house has a hip roof, two interior chimneys, and a widow's walk at the top. The house has two rooms on each side of a central hallway on each floor. The ceilings are about 12 feet (3.7 metres) high. The house has piazzas on three sides, supported by square columns. The front door has sidelights and a five-light transom. The windows are six over six light sash windows. The drawing room windows are French windows with panels below that open to the porch.

The interior walls are wide, horizontal planks covered with wallpaper. The central staircase has been moved back. Currently, there is a U-shaped staircase with a landing above the back entrance.

A passageway connects to the original brick house, which served as the kitchen and servants' quarters. This is the 1790 two-story brick building with a hip roof and central chimney.
