= Juanita Goggins =

American politician

Member of the South Carolina House of Representatives from the 49th district
- In office 1975–1980

Personal details
- Born: May 11, 1934 Pendleton, South Carolina
- Died: c. February 20, 2010 (aged 75) Columbia, South Carolina
- Party: Democratic
- Spouse: Horace W. Goggins (div.)
- Children: One
- Education: South Carolina State University; University of South Carolina

Juanita W. Goggins (May 11, 1934 – c. February 20, 2010) was the first African-American woman elected to the South Carolina legislature; in 1974 she gained a seat in the state House of Representatives. She was re-elected and served a total of three terms before resigning for unspecified health reasons in 1980.

== Early life and education ==
Born in rural Anderson County, South Carolina in 1934, Juanita was one of ten children of sharecroppers. She was the only one to earn a four-year college degree. She graduated from South Carolina State College, a historically black college, where she also earned a master's degree. She became a teacher in the segregated public schools of Rock Hill.

== Marriage and family ==
Juanita married Horace W. Goggins, a dentist. They had a son whom they named Horace W., II.

== Activism ==
Motivated by her interest in education, Goggins became active in the civil rights movement and politics. Rock Hill was the site of civil rights demonstrations in the 1960s to end segregation in public facilities.

In 1972 she was elected as a delegate to the Democratic National Convention, where she was the first black woman to represent the state of South Carolina. That year she was appointed as a member of the South Carolina State Advisory Committee to the United States Commission on Civil Rights. (She has erroneously been reported as the first black woman appointed to the Civil Rights Commission, but that honor was held by Frankie Muse Freeman, appointed in 1964.) As a nationally known, groundbreaking figure, Goggins was invited to the White House during the presidency of Jimmy Carter.

== Political career ==
Defeating a white man, Goggins was elected in 1974 to represent Rock Hill in the state House of Representatives, and re-elected to serve a total of three terms. Among her accomplishments as legislator were securing funding for sickle-cell anemia testing in county health departments; the disease affects primarily African Americans, whose health programs had been underfunded during the decades of segregation and disfranchisement. She also helped pass a 1977 law that provided for education funding in South Carolina; it was still in use at the time of her death. The Associated Press wrote: "Her proposals to expand kindergarten and to reduce student-teacher ratios in the primary grades were adopted after she left politics in 1980, citing health issues."

Her last surviving sibling, Ilese Dixon, later said of her: "She was not bashful or anything. She liked to talk. I used to say she could sell an Eskimo ice. She was just lively and smart. She thought she could fix the world."

== Later years ==
Several years after Goggins left the state legislature, she and her husband divorced. She moved to Columbia, where she worked for a time as a state social worker. She also established a nonprofit tutoring service.

She became increasingly reclusive within her neighborhood of mostly elderly black people. She had let one neighbor in only once in 16 years. After being mugged in the neighborhood, she did not go out as much and he used to get groceries for her, leaving them at her door. Her son Horace W. Goggins, Jr. and the property manager, Linda Martin, had tried to arrange help, including monitoring from social services, but Juanita Goggins refused the assistance.

She died in February 2010 of hypothermia, freezing to death in her home, although the heat was working. The electricity had been turned off for non-payment but after her death, officials found that Goggins had $2500 in cash in the house. Neighbors contacted Goggins' landlord after they had noticed that her lights had not been turned on for some time. The coroner stated that he found indications that she had suffered from dementia. She is believed to have died on February 20, 2010, however, her body was not discovered for 11 days.

== Legacy and honors ==
- In 2009, part of Highway 5 in Rock Hill, South Carolina was named in her honor.
