= Faith Cabin Library at Anderson County Training School =

Historic library building in South Carolina, United States

- U.S. National Register of Historic Places
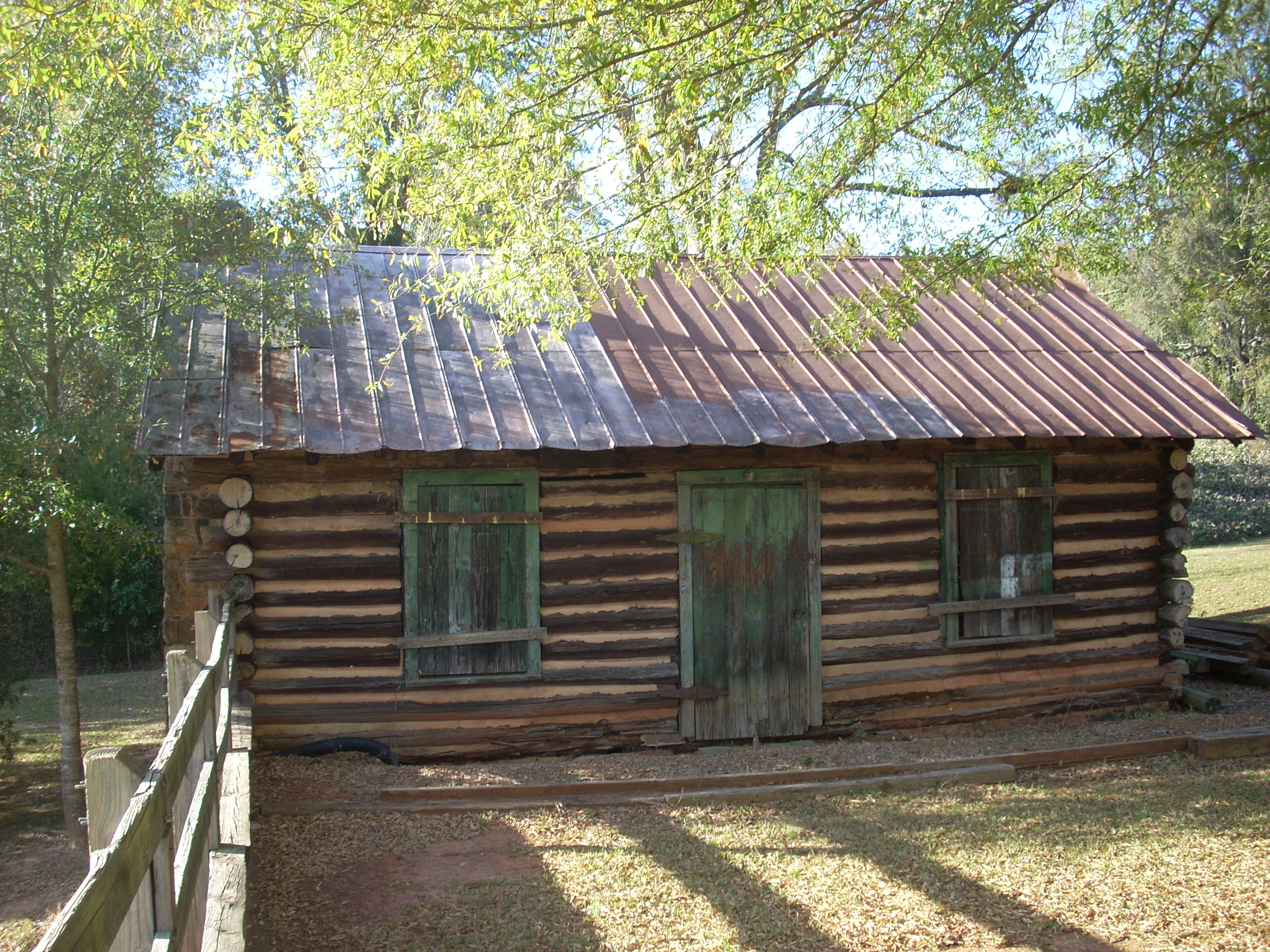
- Faith Cabin Library, 2012

- Location within South Carolina Location within the United States
- Location: 145 Town St., Pendleton, South Carolina, 29670
- Coordinates: 34°39′08″N 82°47′16″W
- Built: 1936
- Architectural style: Log cabin
- NRHP reference No.: 12000941
- Added to NRHP: November 14, 2012

The Faith Cabin Library at Anderson County Training School in Pendleton, South Carolina was one of the 26 Faith Cabin Libraries constructed in South Carolina to offer library services to rural African Americans who were barred from using other library facilities. The one-room, free-standing log cabin with a fieldstone chimney and foundation was built on the grounds of the Anderson County Training School, a Rosenwald School, and paid for by money and timber from the local community.

It was open year-round to serve the community and school until its closure in 1954 when a new equalization school was built nearby. It is currently owned by the Pendleton Community Center.
