= Woodburn (Pendleton, South Carolina) =

Historic house in South Carolina, United States

- U.S. National Register of Historic Places
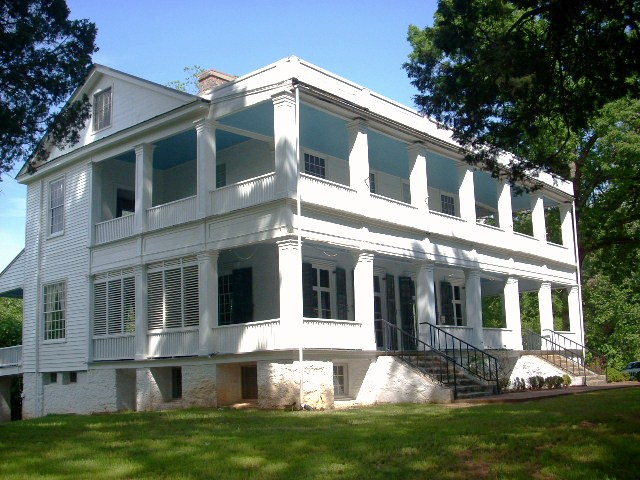
- Woodburn in 2009

- Location within South Carolina Location within the United States
- Location: 130 History Lane; Pendleton, South Carolina 29670
- Coordinates: 34°38′27″N 82°47′46″W
- Built: ca. 1830
- Part of: Pendleton Historic District (ID70000560)
- NRHP reference No.: 71000741
- Added to NRHP: May 6, 1971

Woodburn or the Woodburn Plantation is an antebellum house in Pendleton in Anderson County, South Carolina. It is at 130 History Lane just off of U.S. 76. It was built as a summer home by Charles Cotesworth Pinckney. Woodburn was named to the National Register of Historic Places on May 6, 1970. It also is part of the Pendleton Historic District.

== History ==
Although some indicate that Woodburn was built in the early 19th century, it is believed to have been built around 1830 by Charles Cotesworth Pinckney. Charles Cotesworth Pinckney (1789–1865) was a son of Thomas Pinckney. He was named for his uncle Charles Cotesworth Pinckney, who was a delegate to the Constitutional Convention. The younger Pinckney was lieutenant governor of South Carolina from 1832 to 1834.

Thomas Pinckney, a brother of Charles, built his summer home "Altamont" in Pendleton. This house no longer exists. In 1828, Charles Pinckney purchased land in the Pendleton area. He constructed Woodburn around 1830.

In 1852, Charles Pinckney sold Woodburn to David S. Taylor, who resold it to John Bailey Adger. Dr. Adger had been a Presbyterian missionary in Smyrna and Constantinople. Adger sold Woodburn to his brother Joseph E. Adger in 1858. It was bought by Augustine T. Smythe in 1881, who developed it into a model livestock farm with purebred cattle and race horses.

William Frederick Calhoun Owen purchased the land in 1911, but he lost it through mortgage foreclosure in 1930. It was later sold to John Frank. Later it was acquired by the U.S. government and then by Clemson College. It is currently owned by the Pendleton Historic Foundation.

Jane Edna Hunter, an African-American social worker, was born in 1882 to sharecropper parents on the Woodburn Plantation. She went on to establish the Phillis Wheatley Association in Cleveland, which was named to honor Phillis Wheatley, a Revolutionary era African-American poet.

Woodburn is now a museum home run by the Pendleton Historic Foundation. It is open Sunday and Saturday afternoons from April to October. Eighteen furnished rooms on three floors can be viewed. Adjacent to Woodburn is the Pendleton District Agricultural Museum.

== Architecture ==
The original house was constructed around 1830 and enlarged in 1850. A widow's walk at the top of the house was removed in the 20th century.

The house is a 2 1/2-story frame house on a full, raised basement. The house was covered in clapboards. The house is a "Charleston-type" house built to take advantage of summer breezes. It has two-story porch or veranda that wraps around three sides of the house. There are two sets of stairs leading from ground level to the first floor. These lead through French doors to either the parlor or the drawing room. Some of the second floor windows have hinged panels below to allow access to the veranda.

The rooms have high ceilings. Most of the interior walls are covered with 10 in (25 cm) horizontal boards. The full basement has a warming kitchen and a dining room that is relatively cool on hot summer days.

Exterior and interior pictures and floor plans prior to its restoration are available.
