= Alexander F. Warley =

American naval officer (1823–1895)

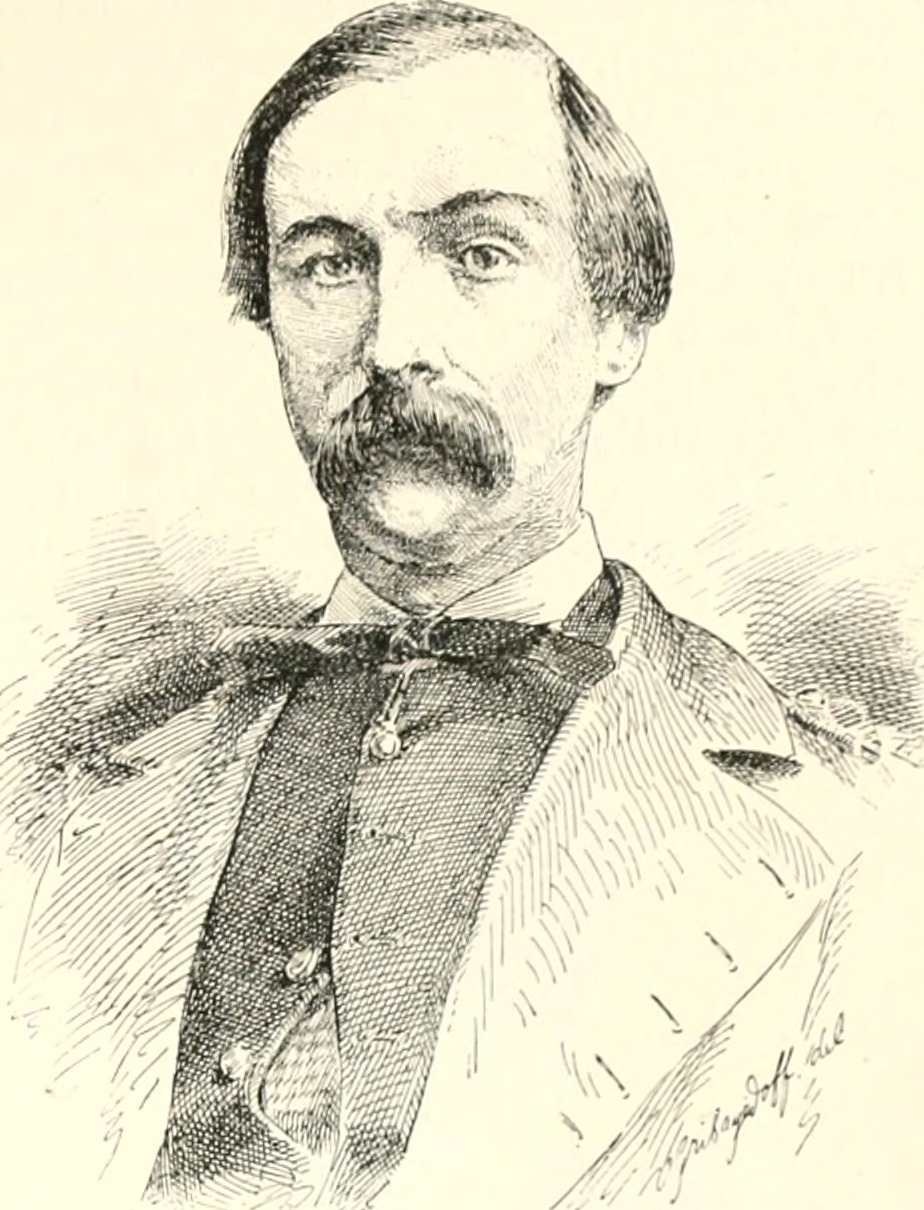
- Sketch of Warley in a 1908 publication
- Born: Alexander Fraser Warley; July 29, 1823; Walterboro, South Carolina, U.S.
- Died: January 12, 1895 (aged 71); New Orleans, Louisiana, U.S.
- Burial place: Pendleton, South Carolina, U.S.
- Education: United States Naval Academy
- Spouse(s): Emilie C. W. Forrest (died 1853) Isabella Johannes Middleton Huger (m. 1862)
- Children: 4
- Military career
- Allegiance: United States; Confederate States
- Branch: United States Navy; Confederate States Navy
- Service years: 1840–1861 (U.S.N.); 1861–1865 (C.S.N.)
- Rank: First lieutenant
- Commands: CSS McRae; CSS Manassas; CSS Water Witch; CSS Albemarle
- Known for: commander of the CSS Manssas and CSS Albemarle
- Conflicts: American Civil War; Battle of the Head of Passes; Capture of New Orleans (POW)

Alexander Fraser Warley (July 29, 1823 – January 12, 1895) was an American naval officer who served in the Confederate States Navy during the American Civil War. He was the commander of the CSS Manassas and the CSS Albemarle.

== Early life ==
Alexander Fraser Warley was born on July 29, 1823, in Walterboro, South Carolina, to Sophia (née Fraser) and Jacob Warley. His grandfather Felix Warley served in the American Revolutionary War and was an original member of the Society of Cincinnati. His family moved to Pendleton in 1831. He was appointed to the United States Naval Academy by John C. Calhoun in 1840 and graduated in 1846. In 1844, while serving on the USS Independence (1814), writer John Stickney described Warley as "exceed[ing] his tolerance" of alcohol. Warley reportedly took off his clothes and challenged a shipmate to a duel. He was court martialed and found guilty following this encounter.

== United States Navy ==
Following graduation, Warley was assigned to the razee USS Independence of the United States Navy. By 1852, he was assigned to the sloop USS Jamestown (1844). In the same year, he wrote a letter of complaint about his skipper on the Jamestown and Warley was subsequently court martialed and found guilty again. In 1858, while on the USS Mississippi (1841), he was court martialed for disobeying orders he thought were unfair. The conviction was remanded by the court. In the same year, he got into a fistfight with an officer and was again court martialed and convicted. He was then transferred. He was serving in Genoa, Italy, at the time of the start of the American Civil War.

== Civil War ==
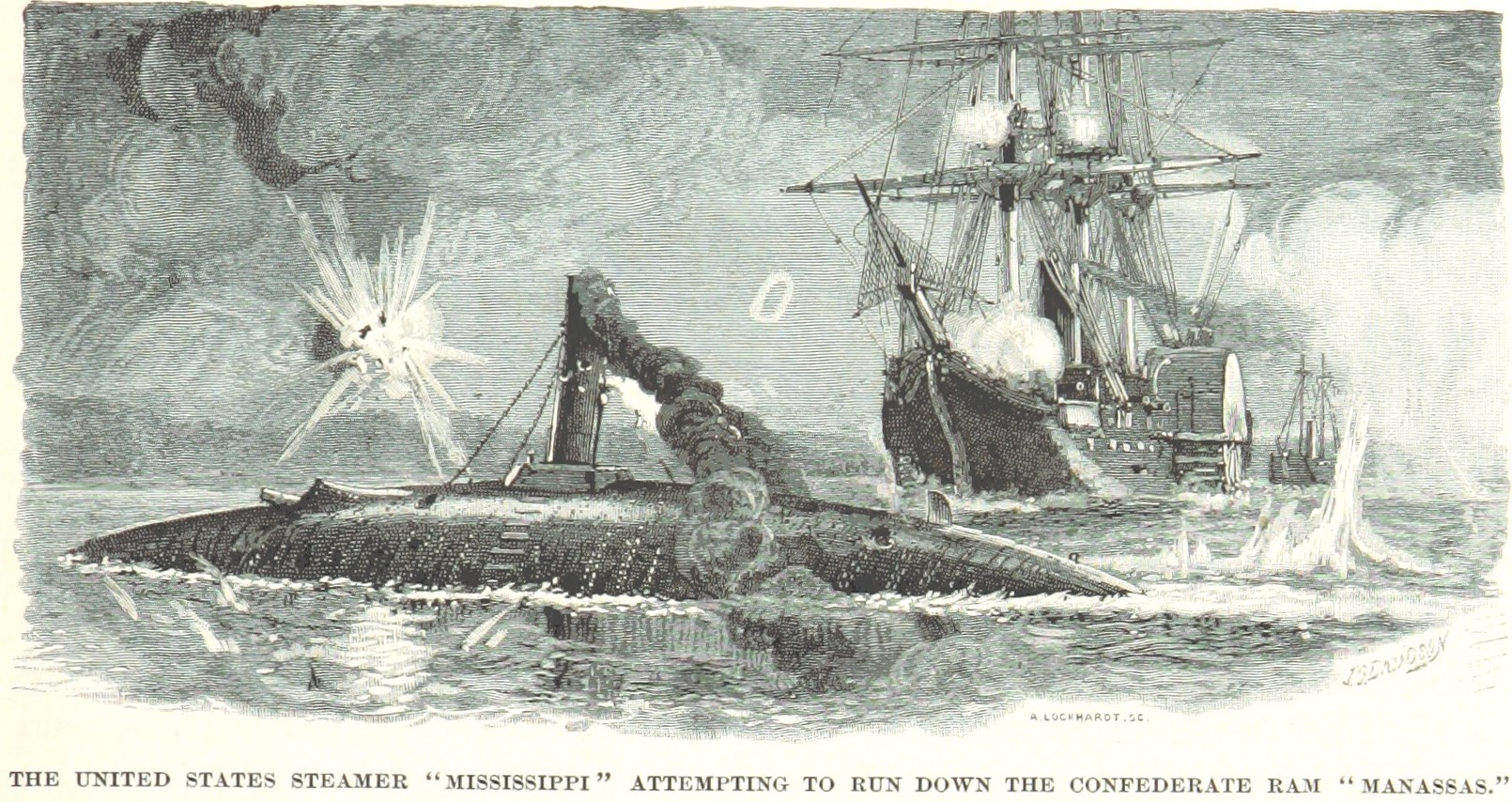
USS Mississippi attempting to ram the ironclad CSS Manassas

In 1861, Warley enlisted with the Confederate States Navy and started service in Charleston. He was appointed as first lieutenant. He was then placed in charge of a battery and saw battle at Morris Island. In July 1861, he commanded the defenses of Ship Island and fought against the Union steamer USS Massachusetts (1860). He was then placed in New Orleans where he commanded the steamer CSS McRae.

Warley was then transferred by George N. Hollins. He took command of the ironclad ram CSS Manassas, which was being held in a private shipyard in New Orleans. He commanded the ironclad in the Battle of the Head of Passes on October 12, 1861. He was in command when it punched a hole in the steam sloop USS Richmond (1860), a vessel Warley served on when he was with the U.S. Navy. He commanded the ironclad in the Capture of New Orleans in April 1862. The Manassas hit the USS Mississippi in the battle and collided with the USS Brooklyn (1858) before sinking. Following the destruction of the Manassas in the battle, Warley escaped and boarded the CSS Louisiana. He was then taken as prisoner to Fort Warren and was exchanged in August 1862.

Warley was ordered to the CSS Chicora in Charleston harbor. In January 1863, he was sent to Galveston, Texas, to the captured USRC Harriet Lane. At his request, he was transferred back to Charleston and served with Duncan Ingraham in his defense of that station. In 1864, he took command of the CSS Water Witch. In September 1864, he took command of the ironclad CSS Albemarle, succeeding John Newland Maffitt. A month later, the Albemarle was sunk by a torpedo during a raid in Plymouth, North Carolina. He wrote a short passage entitled "Note on the Destruction of the 'Albemarle'" in the monthly magazine The Century in 1888 describing the loss of the Albemarle. He returned to Charleston and served there the remainder of the war. Following the war, he worked for the city government of New Orleans.

== Personal life ==
Warley married Emilie C. W. Forrest, a daughter of French Forrest, around 1848. They had no children and she died in 1853. He married Isabella Johannes Middleton Huger, daughter of John M. Huger of New Orleans, on December 1, 1862. They had four children, including Sophia Maud and Allen Huger.

Following the war, Warley lived in Pendleton for about four years before living the remainder of his life in New Orleans. He died on January 12, 1895, at his mansion on the corner of Julia and St. Charles streets in New Orleans. He was buried in a family vault at St. Paul's Episcopal Church in Pendleton.
