= Boone House (St. Petersburg, Florida) =

Historic house in Florida, United States

- U.S. National Register of Historic Places
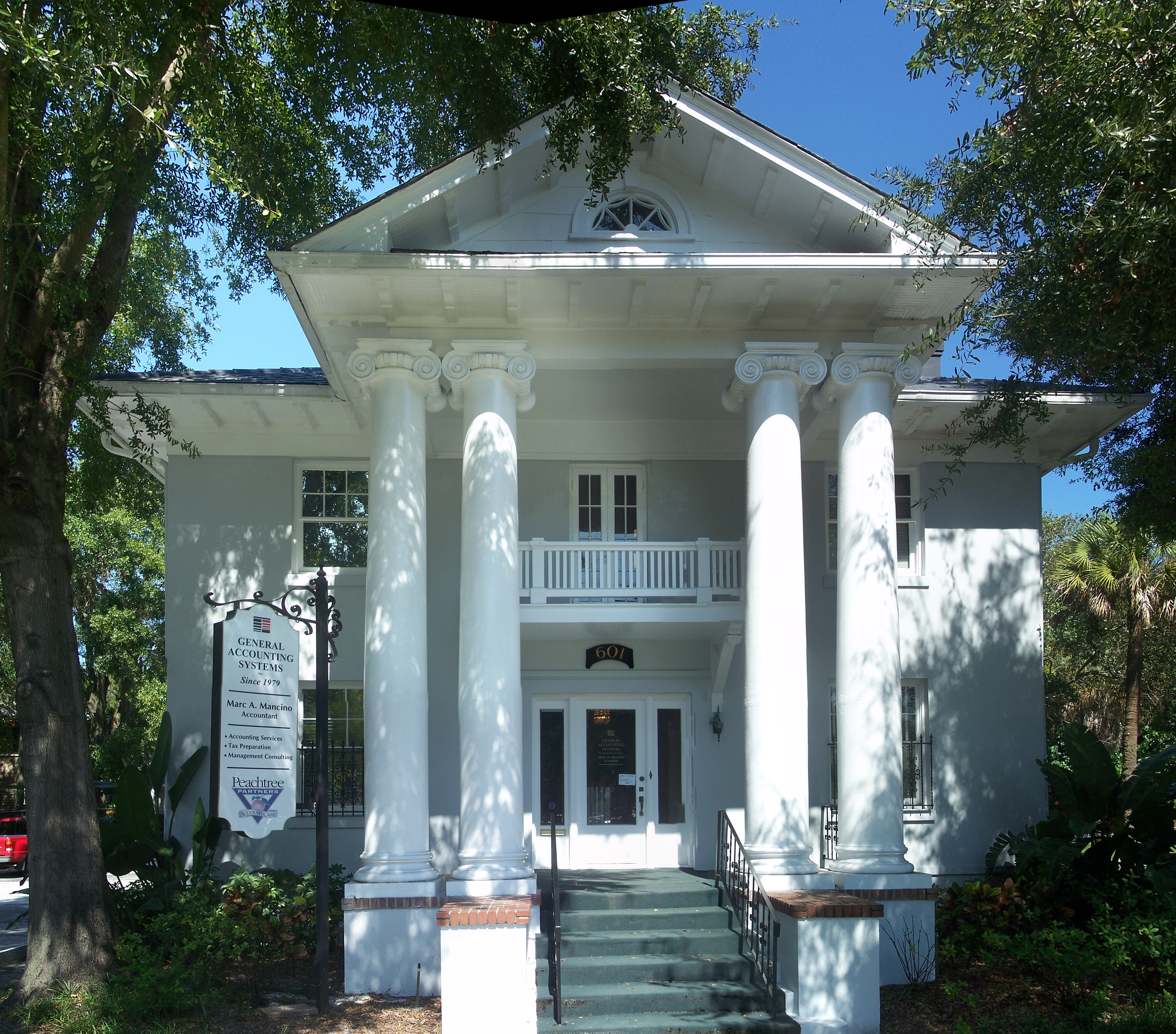

- Location within Florida Location within the United States
- Location: 601 5th Avenue North, St. Petersburg, Florida
- Coordinates: 27°46′38″N 82°38′31″W
- Architectural style: Colonial Revival
- NRHP reference No.: 86001457
- Added to NRHP: 3 July 1986

The Boone House is a historic home in St. Petersburg, Florida, United States. It was built in 1910 in the Colonial Revival style of architecture. According to a 1978 survey of 26 other homes that were built no later than 1910, only the Willard and the Boone Houses feature masonry construction. The house is named after Benjamin T. Boone, who devoted himself to real estate development in St. Petersburg. It is located at 601 Fifth Avenue North. On July 3, 1986, it was added to the U.S. National Register of Historic Places.
