= Boone-Douthit House =

Historic house in South Carolina, United States

- Boone--Douthit House
- U.S. National Register of Historic Places
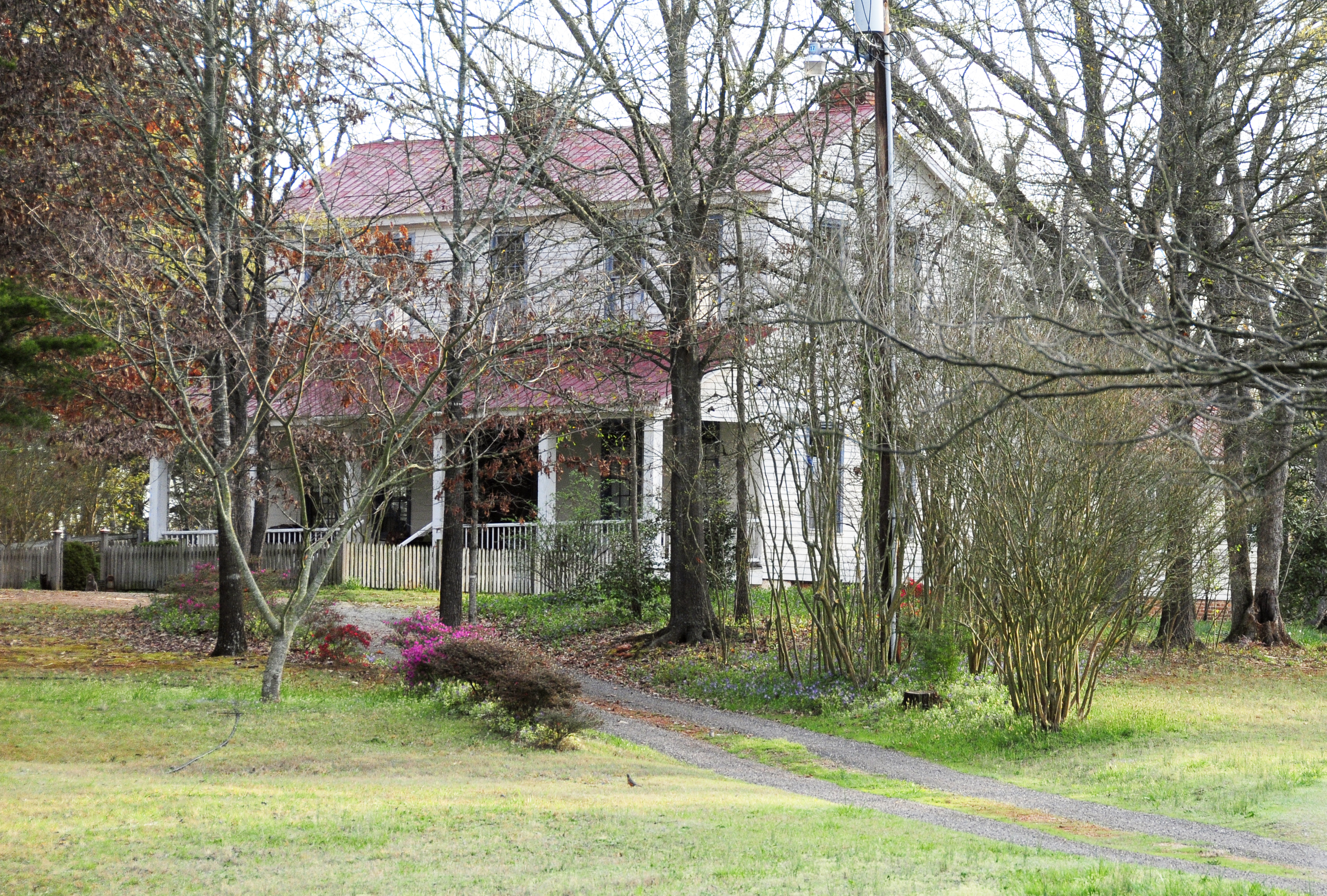

- Location within South Carolina Location within the United States
- Nearest city: Pendleton, South Carolina
- Coordinates: 34°36′21″N 82°43′50″W
- Area: 6.4 acres (2.6 ha)
- Built: 1895
- Built by: Samuel B. Langston
- Architectural style: Greek Revival
- NRHP reference No.: 97000742
- Added to NRHP: July 3, 1997

The Boone-Douthit House is located near Pendleton, South Carolina. The house is an excellent example of how an “upstate” (western) South Carolina plantation house has been expanded as its occupant's needs changed over time, and/or as the occupants pursued other interests. In addition to the main home, the site also includes a large barn, a secondary house, a building that may have once served as a doctor's office, a small storage building, and another small building that may have been used for silkworm culture, all of which contribute to the site's historical significance. The house is thought to have been constructed around 1849.

A site visit in 2012 confirmed that much impressive restoration has recently taken place. Limited views of this historic landmark are available from the public highway.

The Boone-Douthit House was listed in the National Register on July 3, 1997.
