= Pendleton, South Carolina =

Pendleton
- Town
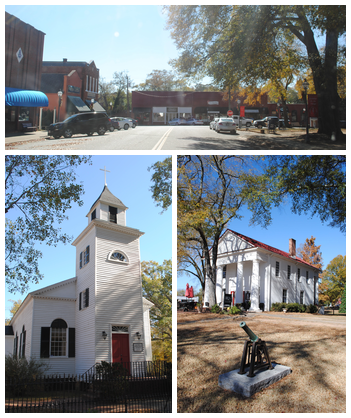
- Top, left to right: Downtown Pendleton, Saint Paul's Episcopal Church, Farmers Hall

- Flag Seal
- Motto: "History, Hospitality, Happenings...Home"
- Location within the state of South Carolina
- Coordinates: 34°38′05″N 82°47′11″W
- Country: United States
- State: South Carolina
- County: Anderson

Area
  - Total: 4.85 sq mi (12.57 km^{2})
  - Land: 4.83 sq mi (12.50 km^{2})
  - Water: 0.027 sq mi (0.07 km^{2})
- Elevation: 824 ft (251 m)

Population (2020)
  - Total: 3,489
  - Density: 722.7/sq mi (279.05/km^{2})
- Time zone: UTC−5 (Eastern (EST))
  - Summer (DST): UTC−4 (EDT)
- ZIP code: 29670
- Area codes: 864, 821
- FIPS code: 45-55645
- GNIS feature ID: 2407096
- Website: www.townofpendleton.org

Pendleton is a town in Anderson County, South Carolina, United States. The population was 3,489 at the 2020 census. It is a sister city of Stornoway in the Outer Hebrides of Scotland. The town is located southeast of Clemson, SC, which is home to Clemson University.

The Pendleton Historic District, consisting of the town and its immediate surroundings, was added to the National Register of Historic Places in 1970. Particularly notable historic buildings on the Pendleton town square include Farmer's Hall and Hunter's Store, which is currently the headquarters of the Pendleton District Historical, Recreational and Tourism Commission. Near Pendleton are the historic plantation homes Ashtabula and Woodburn.

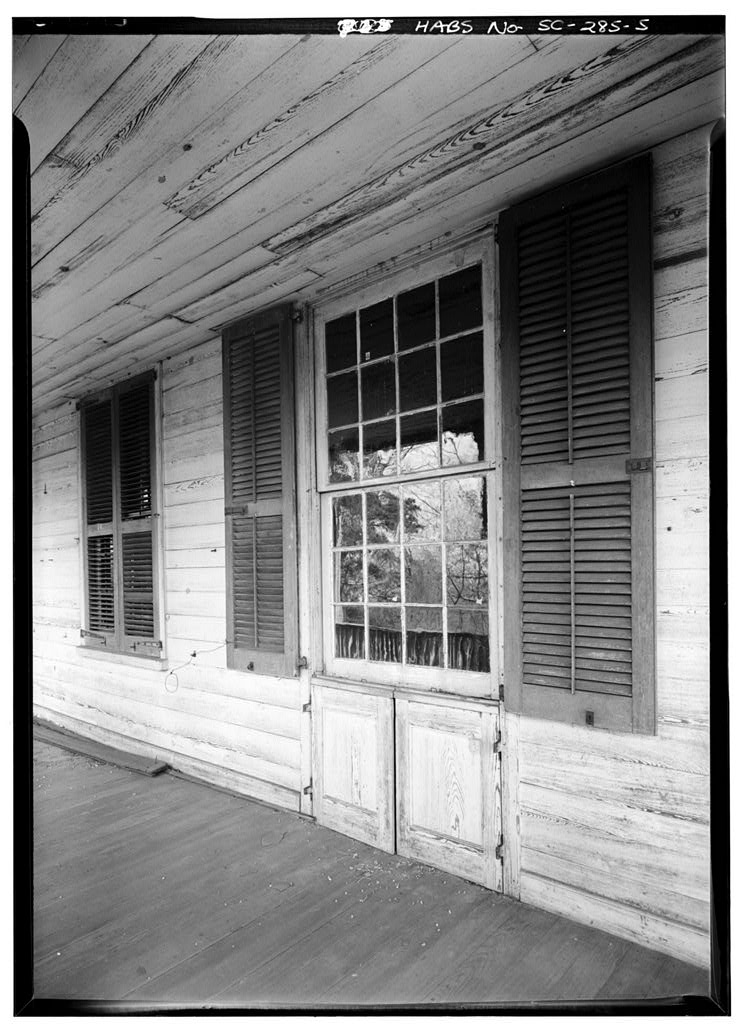
Detail of window with hinged panels, Woodburn Plantation

== History ==
For centuries, the land that is now Pendleton was the territory of the Cherokee nation. After England claimed South Carolina as a colony, the Cherokee traded with the British. After the Cherokee lost the war of 1759–60 against the British, the British dominated trade in the region and began to settle more of the land with large farms. Andrew Pickens, who was a general in the Revolutionary War moved to the area and commissioned the District of Pendleton in 1790. During the first half of the 1800s, wealthy families built homes in Pendleton. These homes were built as a summer vacation spot for the low-country plantation owners. Charles Cotesworth Pinckney (1789–1865) built Woodburn Plantation in 1830. Later, the Adger family, a wealthy family from Charleston, expanded the plantation to over 1,000 acres (400 ha) and enlarged the house to over 18 rooms.

The Ashtabula, Boone-Douthit House, Faith Cabin Library at Anderson County Training School, Pendleton Historic District, and Woodburn are listed on the National Register of Historic Places.

== Geography ==
Pendleton is located in northwestern Anderson County. Its northwestern edge touches the Anderson County/Pickens County line and borders the city of Clemson. U.S. Route 76 passes through the southwest part of town, bypassing the town center and leading northwest to Clemson and southeast 14 miles (23 km) to Anderson, the county seat. Greenville is 30 miles (48 km) to the northeast by U.S. Route 123.

According to the United States Census Bureau, the town has a total area of 3.8 square miles (9.9 km^{2}), of which 3.8 square miles (9.8 km^{2}) is land and 0.04 square miles (0.1 km^{2}), or 0.70%, is water.

== Demographics ==
Historical population
Census	Pop.	Note	%±
1860	854		—
1870	985		15.3%
1880	672		−31.8%
1890	476		−29.2%
1900	568		19.3%
1910	822		44.7%
1920	1,040		26.5%
1930	1,035		−0.5%
1940	1,278		23.5%
1950	1,432		12.1%
1960	2,358		64.7%
1970	2,615		10.9%
1980	3,154		20.6%
1990	3,314		5.1%
2000	2,966		−10.5%
2010	2,964		−0.1%
2020	3,489		17.7%
2022 (est.)	3,589	▲	2.9%
U.S. Decennial Census

=== 2020 census ===
Pendleton racial composition
Race	Num.	Perc.
White (non-Hispanic)	2,323	66.58%
Black or African American (non-Hispanic)	713	20.44%
Native American	4	0.11%
Asian	81	2.32%
Pacific Islander	1	0.03%
Other/Mixed	235	6.74%
Hispanic or Latino	132	3.78%

As of the 2020 census, Pendleton had a population of 3,489. The median age was 36.4 years. 18.5% of residents were under the age of 18 and 20.2% of residents were 65 years of age or older. For every 100 females there were 83.1 males, and for every 100 females age 18 and over there were 80.6 males age 18 and over.

98.0% of residents lived in urban areas, while 2.0% lived in rural areas.

There were 1,638 households in Pendleton, of which 25.1% had children under the age of 18 living in them. Of all households, 32.5% were married-couple households, 20.8% were households with a male householder and no spouse or partner present, and 40.2% were households with a female householder and no spouse or partner present. About 37.4% of all households were made up of individuals and 15.6% had someone living alone who was 65 years of age or older.

There were 1,870 housing units, of which 12.4% were vacant. The homeowner vacancy rate was 4.2% and the rental vacancy rate was 6.0%.

=== 2000 census ===
As of the census of 2000, there were 2,966 people, 1,397 households, and 799 families residing in the town. The population density was 831.5 inhabitants per square mile (321.0/km^{2}). There were 1,533 housing units at an average density of 429.7 units per square mile (165.9 units/km^{2}). The racial makeup of the town was 64.70% White, 33.07% African American, 0.20% Native American, 0.47% Asian, 0.54% from other races, and 1.01% from two or more races. Hispanic or Latino of any race were 1.52% of the population.

There were 1,397 households, out of which 21.0% had children under the age of 18 living with them, 37.0% were married couples living together, 16.8% had a female householder with no husband present, and 42.8% were non-families. 35.4% of all households were made up of individuals, and 12.5% had someone living alone who was 65 years of age or older. The average household size was 2.12 and the average family size was 2.75.

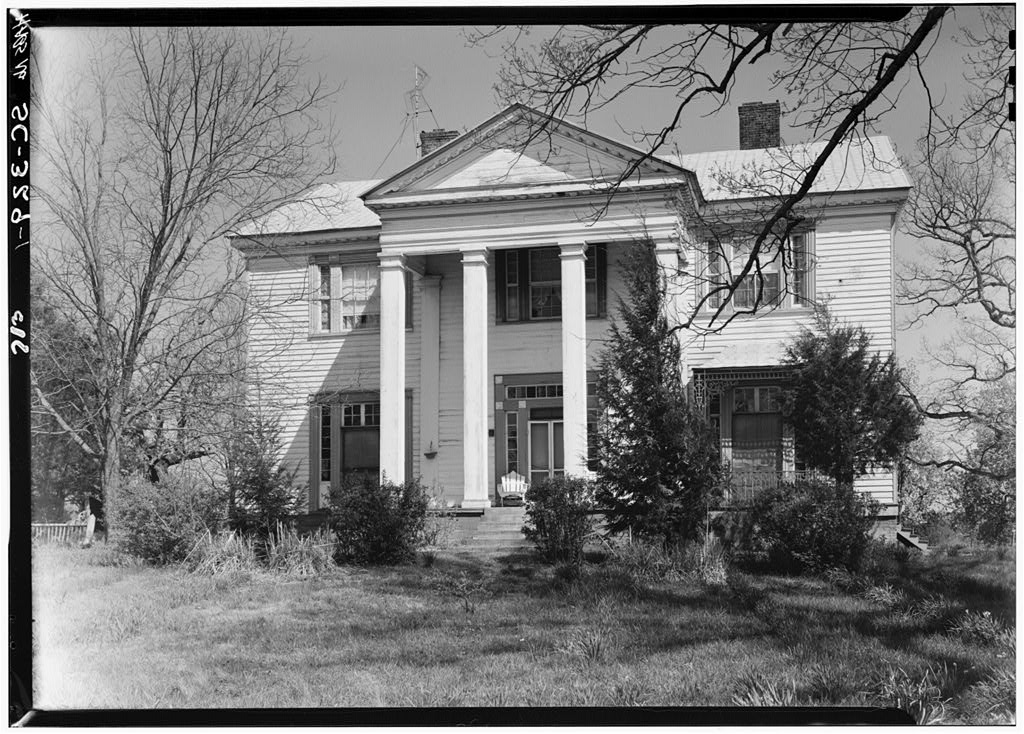
Main house at Montpelier, Samuel Maverick plantation, Pendleton

In the town, the population was spread out, with 20.2% under the age of 18, 12.8% from 18 to 24, 26.8% from 25 to 44, 22.6% from 45 to 64, and 17.6% who were 65 years of age or older. The median age was 38 years. For every 100 females, there were 83.1 males. For every 100 females age 18 and over, there were 77.5 males.

The median income for a household in the town was $28,052, and the median income for a family was $37,606. Males had a median income of $30,341 versus $23,843 for females. The per capita income for the town was $16,630. About 15.7% of families and 20.8% of the population were below the poverty line, including 32.2% of those under age 18 and 17.2% of those age 65 or over.

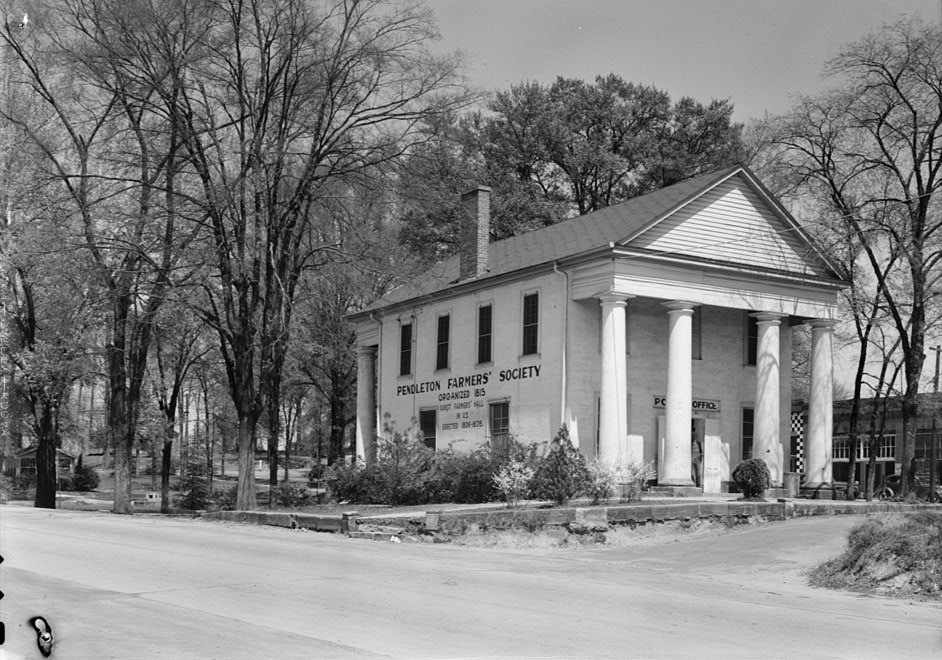
Downtown Pendleton with Farmers Hall, early twentieth century

== Education ==
Schools include Pendleton Elementary, Mount Lebanon Elementary, LaFrance Elementary, Riverside Middle School, and Pendleton High School. Tri-County Technical College is located within the town.

Pendleton has a public library, a branch of the Anderson County Library System.

Pendleton has 4 schools: 4 public schools and 0 private schools. Pendleton schools spend $11,812 per student (The US average is $12,383). There are 16 pupils per teacher, 488 students per librarian, and 366 children per counselor.

== Notable residents ==
- Stephen Adams (1807–1857), born in the Pendleton District, congressman and senator
- Joe Ellis Brown (1933–2018), was an American schoolteacher and politician.
- Floride Calhoun, wife of U.S. Senator and Vice President John C. Calhoun
- Warren R. Davis (1793 – 1835), elected as a Jacksonian to the 20th - 24th Congresses.
- Barnard Elliott Bee, Jr., commanded the 3rd Brigade, Army of the Shenandoah, 1861
- Juanita Goggins, was the first African American woman elected to the South Carolina legislature.
- Brandon Hall, is an American actor who starred in God Friended Me.
- Jane Edna Hunter, African American social worker who established the Working Girls Association
- Bryce McGowens is a basketball player for the Charlotte Hornets
- Samuel Augustus Maverick, Texas rancher/politician for whom the word "maverick" originated.
- Thomas Jefferson Rusk, early political and military leader of the Republic of Texas
- John Allen Wakefield, political and military leader, took part in the Black Hawk War
- Margaret Sellers Walker (1935–2020), Michigan state official, born in Pendleton
- Alexander F. Warley (1823–1895), Confederate States Navy officer, moved to Pendleton
