= Jenny la Cour =

Danish teacher and textile artist

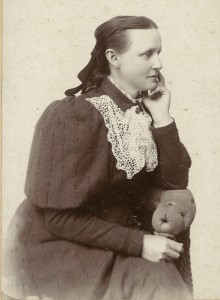
Jenny la Cour

Jenny Erasmine la Cour (1849–1928) was a Danish teacher and textile artist. After attending Askov Højskole as a student, she taught there and in 1885 took charge of a house for girls undertaking teacher training. In 1888, she attended the folk high school in Åkarp, Sweden, to learn weaving and embroidery. The following year she gave courses in weaving in her home, pioneering the revival of hand weaving in Denmark. In 1886, thanks to a grant, she opened a weaving school attached to the Askov school where she taught 800 students over the next 25 years. In 1913, together with a number of colleagues, she established a weaving school in Copenhagen, Husflidsselskabets Vævestue.

== Biography ==
Born on 20 May 1849 in Viby near Aarhus, Jenny Erasmine la Cour was the daughter of Lauritz la Cour (1802–1875) and Ellen Kirstine née Poulsen (1809–1875) and the sister of Poul la Cour, Jørgen Carl la Cour and Hans Christian Ditlev la Cour. She was raised in Skærsø Manor on the peninsula of Mols where she was introduced to handicrafts as a child. In 1872, she attended Askov Højskole, a folk high school, first as a student and later as a teacher in embroidery and textile arts. She lived with her widowed brother Paul who also taught there until he remarried, after which she stayed with various families until she returned to Askov in 1885. She acted as a kind of matron in a house she ran for young girls who attended the newly opened winter school. After two years' attendance, they were able to become handicraft teachers in folk high schools.

In 1888, together with her niece Johanne Siegumfeldt she studied embroidery and weaving at Hvilan folk high school in Burlöv Municipality, Sweden. Specializing in weaving, la Cour started a private weaving course in her home at Askov, pioneering the revival of home weaving in Denmark. She and her niece introduced women to the basic principles of weaving, based on producing towels, aprons and table cloths. They also introduced their students to decorative patterns from Sweden. Two years later, thanks to a grant from the home care association Dansk Husflidsselskab, they ran the school for the next 25 years, teaching some 800 students, 200 of whom took part in a more elaborate course in extended facilities.

In 1913, la Cour participated in yet another pioneering project aimed at reviving Danish weaving traditions and patterns. Together with Elna Mygdal and Sophy A. Christensen as well as the management of Dansk Husflidsselskab including Anton Rosen and Martin Nyrop, she established a weaving studio in Copenhagen.

Jenny la Cour died on 8 February 1928 in Askov.

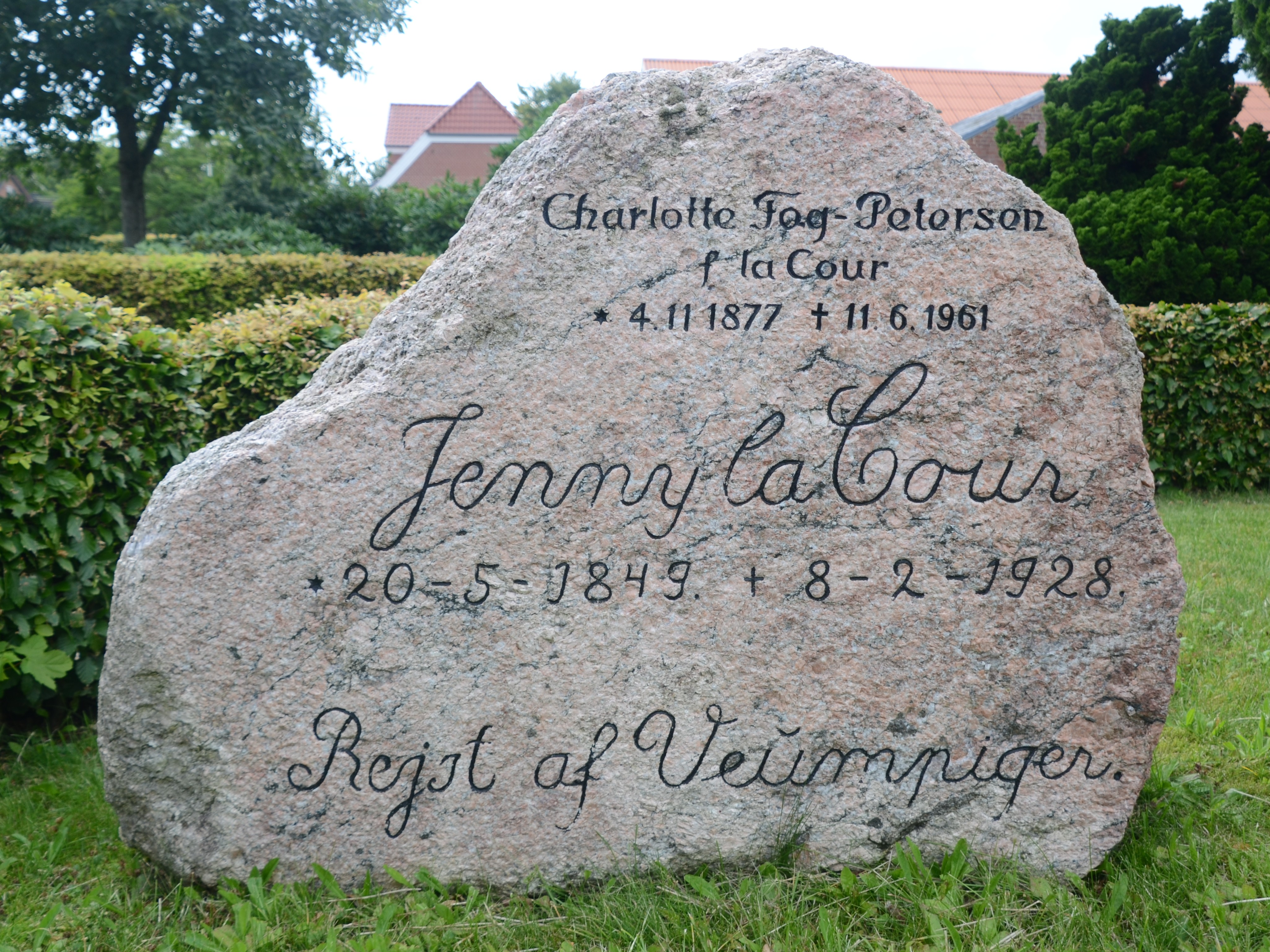
Tombstone at Askov Church
