= William H. Johnson (artist) =

African American artist (1901–1970)

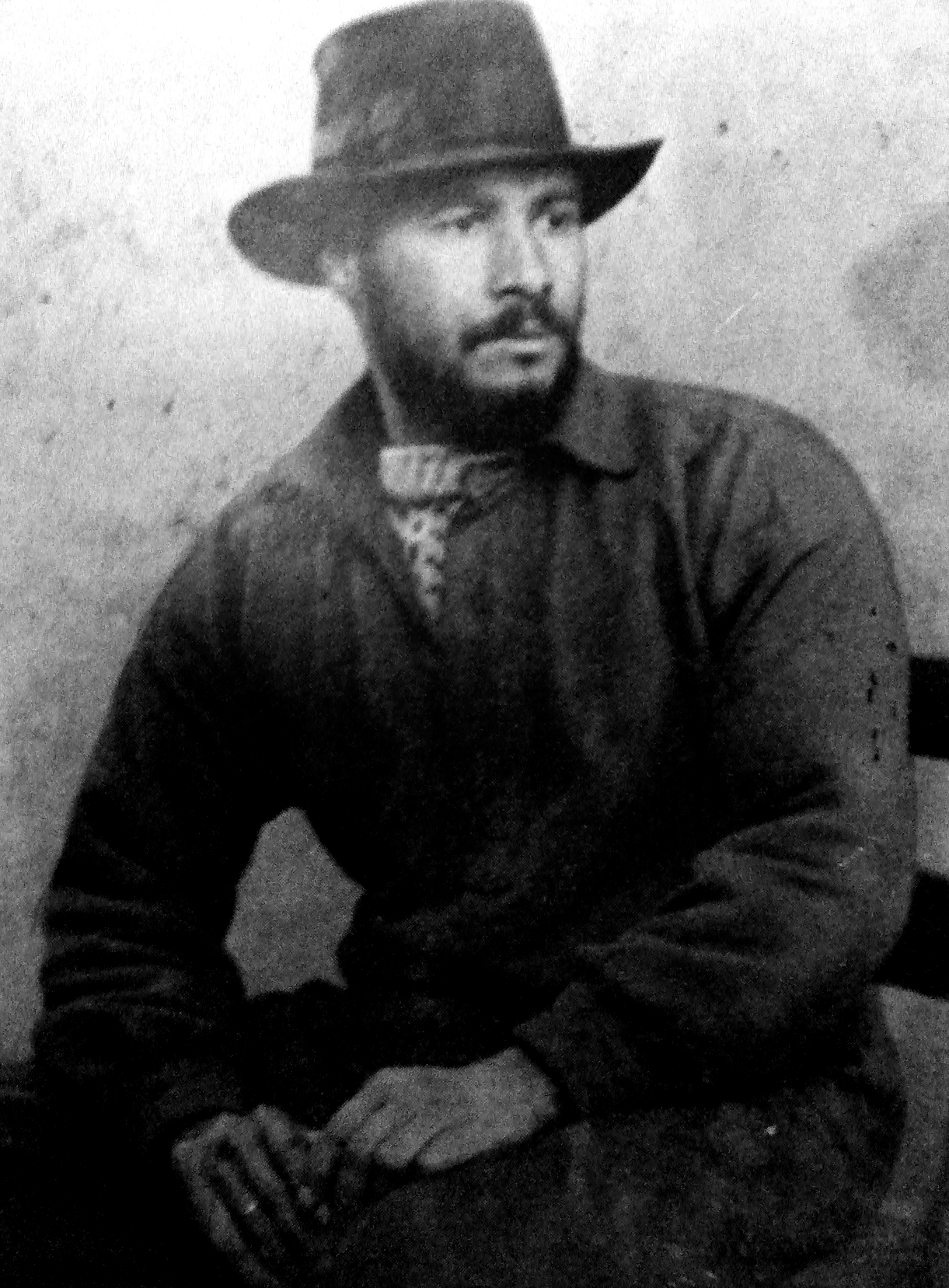
- Johnson in 1951
- Born: William Henry Johnson; March 18, 1901; Florence, South Carolina, U.S.
- Died: April 13, 1970 (aged 69); Central Islip, New York, U.S.
- Spouse: Holcha Krake
- Awards: Harmon Foundation Gold Medal for Excellence in Fine Arts
- Patrons: Charles Hawthorne

William Henry Johnson (March 18, 1901 – April 13, 1970) was an American painter. Born in Florence, South Carolina, he became a student at the National Academy of Design in New York City, working with Charles Webster Hawthorne. He later lived and worked in France, where he was exposed to modernism. After Johnson married Danish textile artist Holcha Krake, the couple lived for some time in Scandinavia. There he was influenced by the strong folk art tradition. The couple moved to the United States in 1938. Johnson eventually found work as a teacher at the Harlem Community Art Center, through the Federal Art Project.

Johnson's style evolved from realism to expressionism to a powerful folk style, for which he is best known. A substantial collection of his paintings, watercolors, and prints is held by the Smithsonian American Art Museum, which has organized and circulated major exhibitions of his works.

== Education ==
William Henry Johnson was born March 18, 1901, in Florence, South Carolina, to Henry Johnson and Alice Smoot. He attended the first public school in Florence, the all-black Wilson School on Athens Street. It is likely that Johnson was introduced to sketching by one of his teachers, Louise Fordham Holmes, who sometimes included art in her curriculum. Johnson practiced drawing by copying the comic strips in the newspapers, and considered a career as a newspaper cartoonist.

He moved from Florence, South Carolina, to New York City at the age of 17. Working a variety of jobs, he saved enough money to pay for classes at the prestigious National Academy of Design. He took a preparatory class with Charles Louis Hinton, then studied with Charles Courtney Curran and George Willoughby Maynard, all of whom emphasized classical portraiture and figure drawing. Beginning in 1923, Johnson worked with the painter Charles Webster Hawthorne, who emphasized the importance of color in painting. Johnson studied with Hawthorne at the Cape Cod School of Art in Provincetown, Massachusetts during the summers, paying for his tuition, food and lodging by working as a general handyman at the school. Johnson received a number of awards at the National Academy of Design, and applied for a coveted Pulitzer Travel Scholarship in his final year. When another student was given the award, Hawthorne raised nearly $1000 to enable Johnson to go abroad to study. .

== Career ==
Johnson arrived in Paris, France in the fall of 1927. He spent a year in Paris, and had his first solo exhibition at the Students and Artists Club in November 1927. Next he moved to Cagnes-sur-Mer in the south of France, influenced by the work of expressionist painter Chaïm Soutine. In France, Johnson learned about modernism. During his time as an artist, Johnson worked in a variety of media: woodcuts, oil, water colors, pen and ink, and serigraphy. He often used whatever materials were available on hand to express his work.

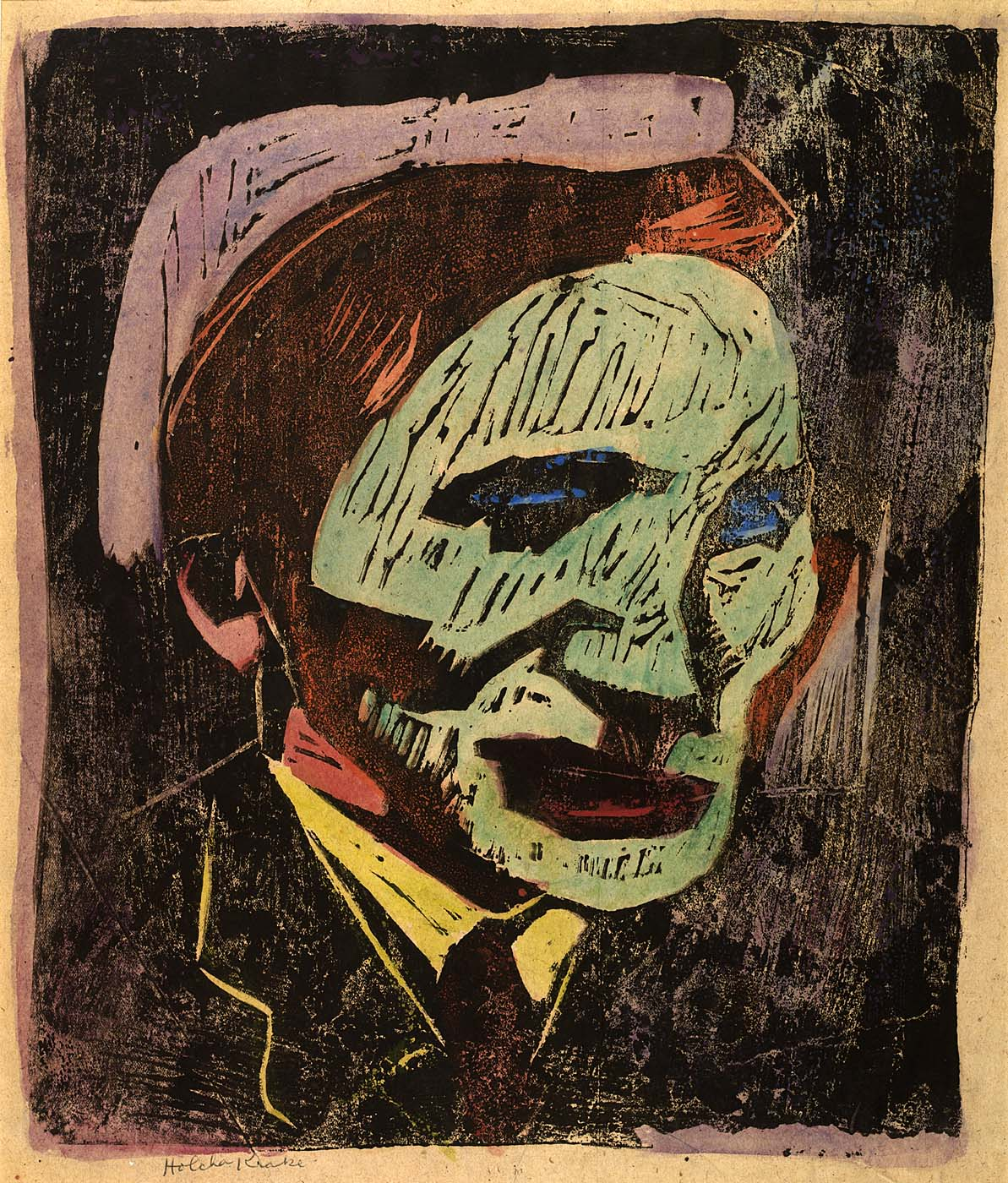
Holcha Krake, by William H. Johnson, hand colored woodcut on paper

During this time, Johnson met the Danish textile artist Holcha Krake (April 6, 1885 – January 13, 1944). Holcha was traveling with her sister Erna, who was also a painter, and Erna's husband, the expressionist sculptor Christoph Voll. Johnson was invited to join them on a tour of Corsica. Johnson and Holcha were deeply attracted in spite of differences in race, culture, and age.

Johnson returned to the United States in 1929. Fellow artist George Luks encouraged Johnson to enter his work at the Harmon Foundation to be considered for the William E. Harmon Foundation Award for Distinguished Achievement Among Negroes in the Fine Arts Field. As a result, Johnson received the Harmon gold medal in the fine arts. He was applauded as a "real modernist", "spontaneous, vigorous, firm, direct". Other winners of the fine art award include Palmer Hayden, May Howard Jackson and Laura Wheeler Waring.

While in the United States, Johnson also visited his family in Florence, where he painted a considerable number of new works. He was apparently almost arrested while painting the Jacobia Hotel, a once-fashionable town landmark which had become a dilapidated house of ill-repute. Whether Johnson's actions or his choice of subject were at issue is unknown. During this visit, Johnson was able to publicly exhibit his paintings twice. The first occasion was at a meeting of the Florence County Teachers Institute on February 22, 1930. The second was at a local YMCA where Johnson's mother worked. Her boss, Bill Covington, arranged for Johnson to exhibit 135 of his paintings for a single afternoon, on April 15, 1930. Although the Florence Morning News described Johnson condescendingly as a "humble ... Negro youth", it also stated that he had "real genius".

Johnson returned to Europe in 1930 by working his way to France on a freighter. He went to Funen, a Danish island, to rejoin Holcha Krake. The couple signed a prenuptial agreement on May 28, 1930, and were married a few days later in the town of Kerteminde. Johnson and his wife spent most of the 1930s in Scandinavia, where his interest in folk art influenced his painting. Johnson focused on artwork that expressed the skilled techniques learned from his many teachers throughout the years.

In April 1932, Johnson and Krake embarked on a journey to Tunisia in North Africa. On route from Denmark the couple visited Germany, The Netherlands, Belgium and finally France, where they took the train from Paris to Marseilles to board the ferry to Tunisia. What followed was a three-month odyssey of exploration where the couple visited the capital Tūnis, studied indigenous Berber pottery and textiles at Nabeul and Kairouan and took expeditions to Sousse, Bardo and Hammamet. The couple both sketched on their tours, creating works that both captured the local North African people and Tunisia’s ancient architectural wonders.

Ceramic exhibitions. Four months after their trip to Tunisia, they debuted their ceramic pieces at the local library in Kerteminde in October 1932. Neither Johnson nor Holcha Krake had worked or shown ceramics prior to their Tunisian trip and the exhibition was given high praise. For Johnson, his ceramic pieces seem to correlate with the dramatic expressionist paintings he made from the period 1932-1938. Which were done in heavy impasto giving the impression of "wet clay."

After Holcha was introduced into his life his art work began to transform due to "Holcha's folk art philosophies". However, as Nazi sentiments increased in Germany and Europe in the late 1930s, many artists were affected. Johnson's brother-in-law Christoph Voll was fired from his teaching position, and his art was labelled "degenerate". Johnson and Krake chose to move to the United States in 1938. After Johnson returned to the United States in 1938," over the course of the next decade, his art transformed into the intense, "primitivist" style he is recognized for today. Both vibrant and somber, these abstracted paintings depict the African-American experience from both a historical and personal perspective". Throughout the 1940s this newly founded style became a catalyst for Johnson's work, as well as many of their attributes in their relationship.

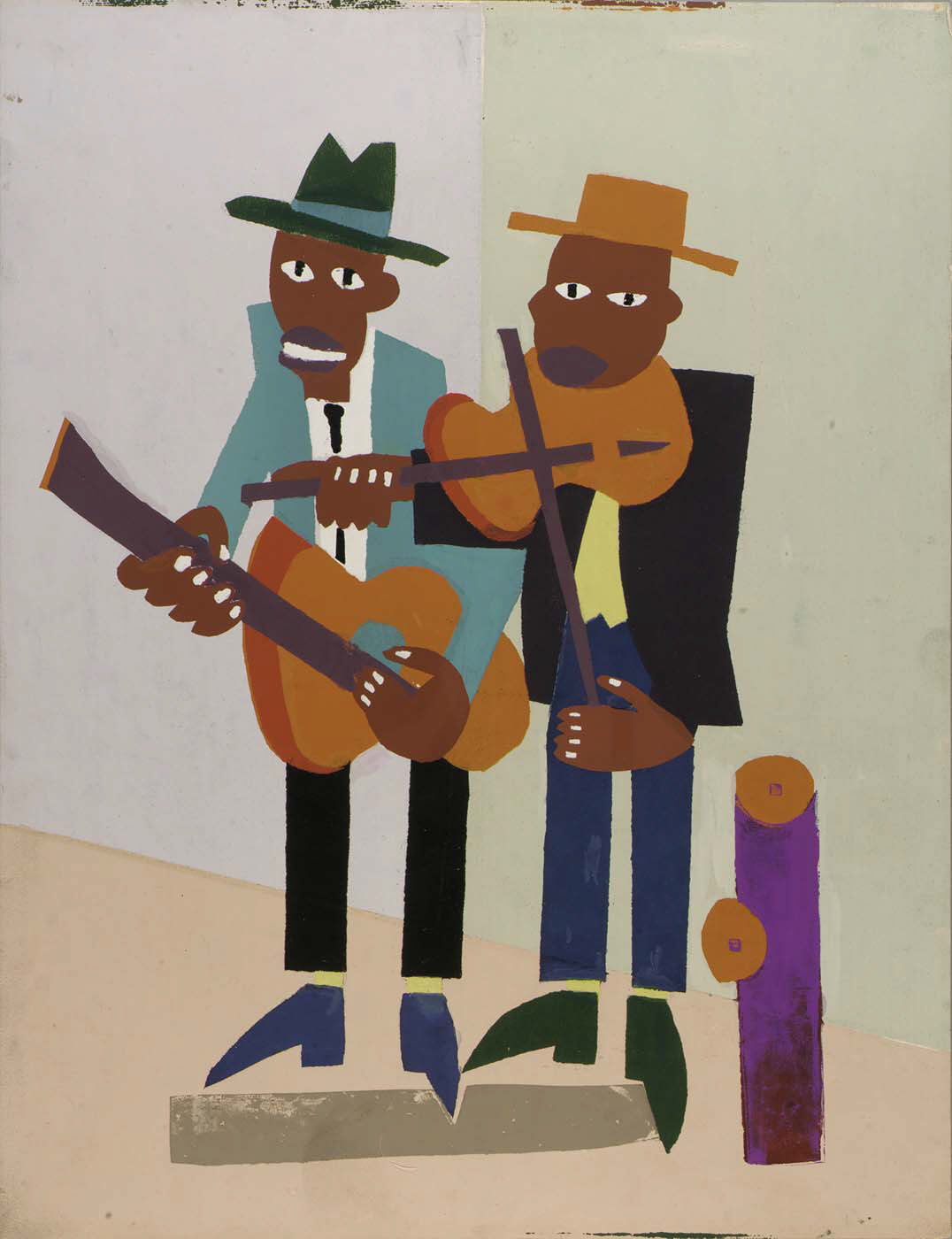
Street Musicians (1939–1940), by William H. Johnson.

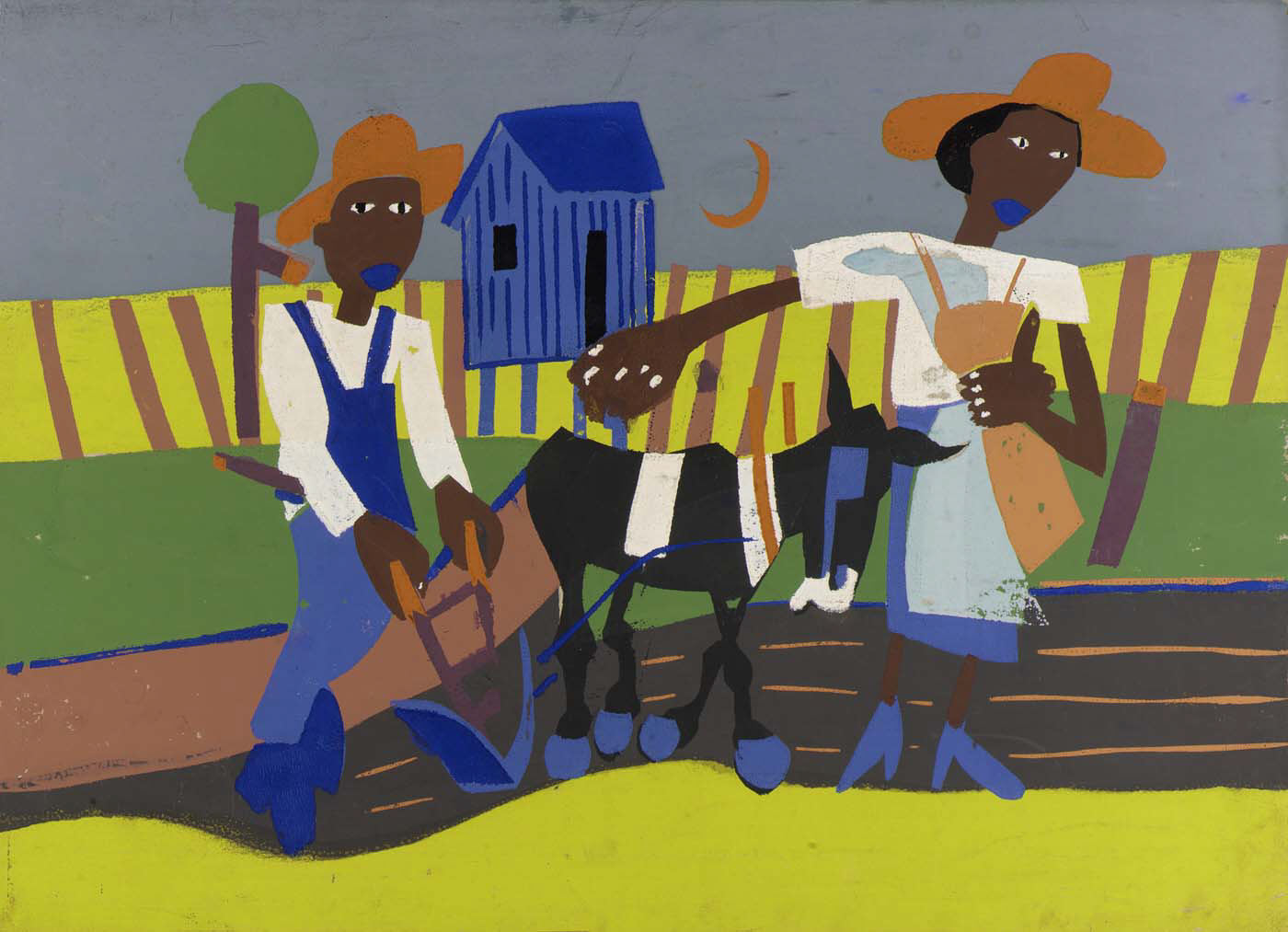
Sowing (1940), by William H. Johnson

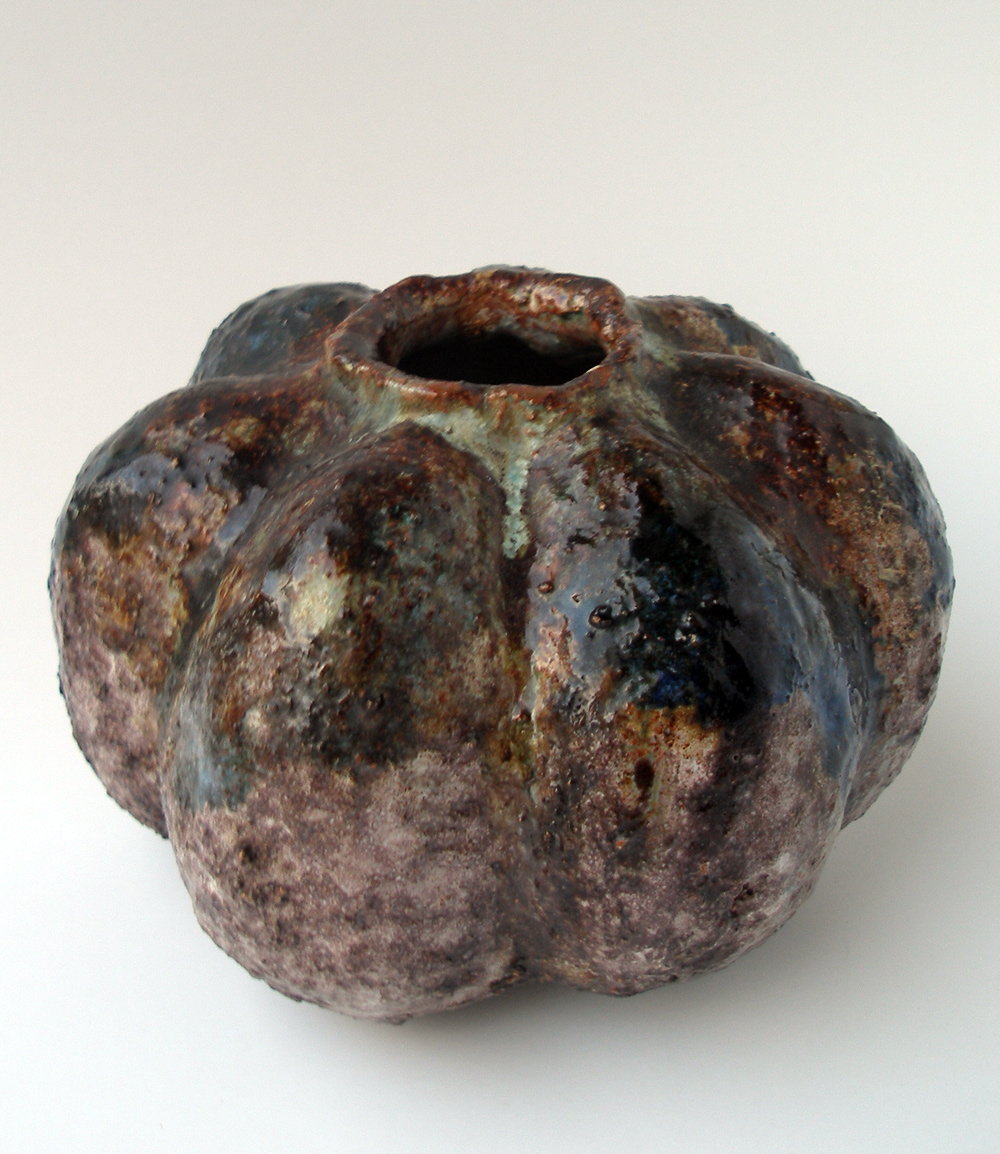
Stoneware vase modelled in an organic shape, with polychrome drip glaze. Incised signature "WHJ" Scandinavia. Ca.1932-1938. Height: 11 ½ cm. Width 15 cm. by William H. Johnson

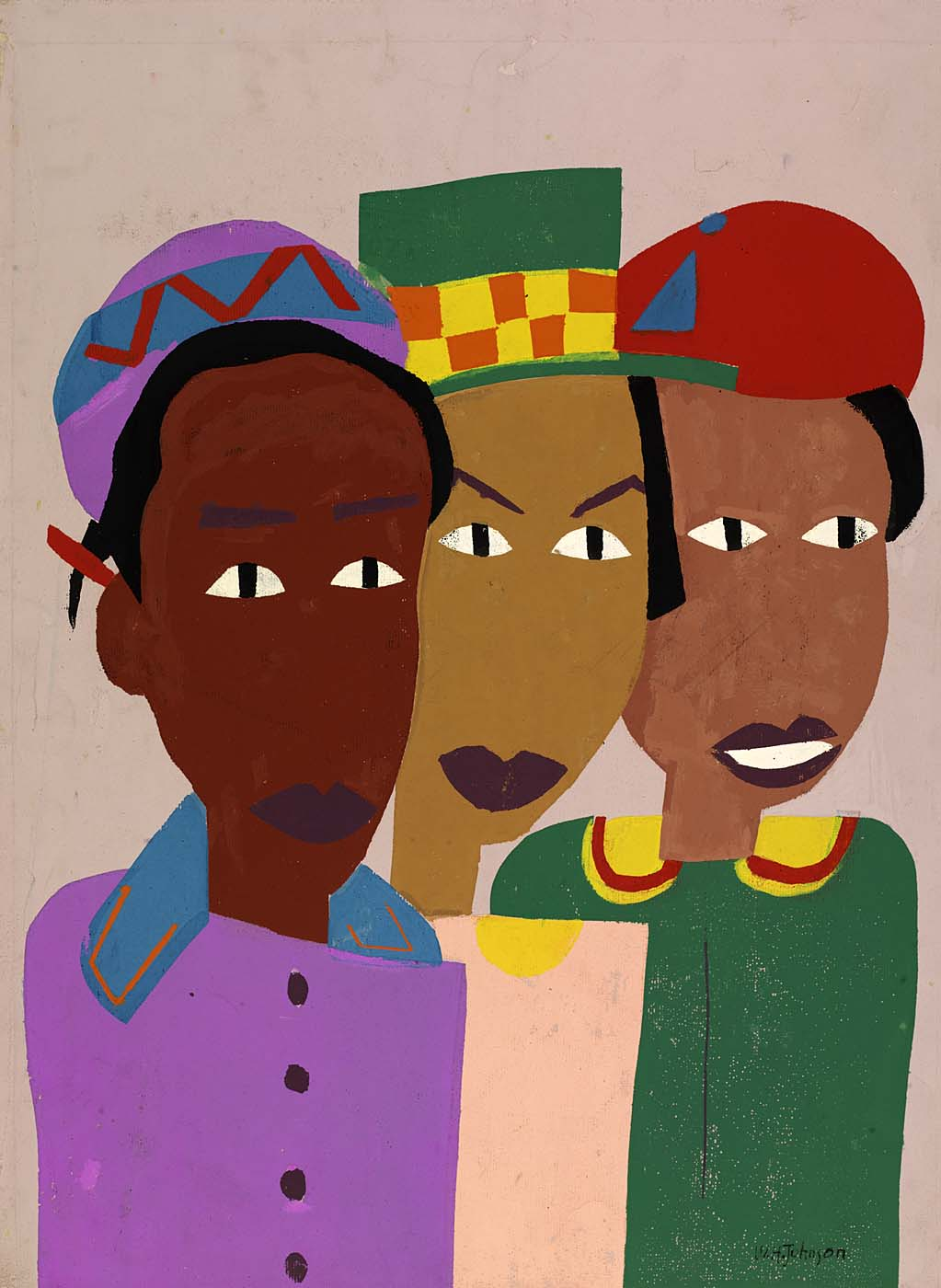
Three Friends (ca. 1944), by William H. Johnson

Johnson joined the WPA federal art project and with the help of Mary Beattie Brady, Johnson eventually found work as a teacher at the Harlem Community Art Center. There he and other teachers instructed about 600 students per week, as part of a local Federal Art Project supported by the Works Progress Administration. Through the center Johnson met important Harlem inhabitants such as Henry Bannarn and Gwendolyn Knight. He immersed himself in African-American culture and traditions, producing paintings that were characterized by their folk art simplicity. Johnson was determined to "paint his own people". He celebrated African American culture and imagery in the urban settings of pieces such as Street life - Harlem, Cafe, and Street Musicians, and in the rural settings of Farm Couple at Work, Sowing, and Going to Market. Harsher realities of Negro life were depicted in Chain Gang and Moon over Harlem, which was a response to the 1943 racial riots in New York. Another series of works showed war-time soldiers and nurses. His pieces emphasized striking and vibrant colors and simplistic figures, and his depictions of African American culture began to draw on his upbringing in the rural South. Additionally, he employed religious and political motifs throughout his work. He aimed to illustrate the richness of the African culture and the modernism of the Harlem Renaissance. The style as well as texture of the pieces demonstrated Johnson's message. In his Jitterbugs paintings, Johnson began experimenting with the relatively unused technique of screen printing, allowing for a quickness and suppleness of the painting. This layering of paint created an intentional appearance of grittiness and roughness to the image. Johnson used this technique to appeal to an aesthetic of durability and perseverance in his subjects. Johnson held a solo exhibition at Alma Reed Galleries in 1941. However, although he enjoyed a degree of success as an artist during the 1940s and 1950s, he was never able to achieve financial stability.

On a personal level, the 1940s were difficult. Bad news came from Europe. Christoph Voll died in Karlsruhe, Germany, on June 16, 1939, after interrogation by Nazi officials. Holcha's family endured the German occupation of Denmark at their home in Odense. In December 1942, Johnson and Krake moved to a larger studio apartment in Greenwich Village. A week later, Johnson's artwork, supplies, and personal possessions were destroyed when the building caught fire. On January 13, 1944, Johnson's wife Holcha died from breast cancer. To deal with his grief, he revisited his family in Florence, and painted works with religious themes, such as Mount Calvary. Mount Calvary and Booker T. Washington Legend (from Johnson's Fighters for Freedom series of 1945) were included in the show The Negro Artist Comes of Age: A National Survey of Contemporary American Artists at the Albany Institute of History and Art in 1945.

In 1946 Johnson left for Denmark to be with his wife's family. However, his behavior became increasingly erratic. "Johnson's grief over his wife's tragic death in 1944, compounded by his own untreated medical issues, precipitated a mental breakdown and subsequent institutionalization." At Ullevål Hospital in Oslo in spring 1947, he was diagnosed with syphilis which had impaired both mental and motor function. As a U.S. citizen who was no longer considered mentally competent, he was sent back to New York by the U.S. Embassy in Oslo. An attorney was appointed by the court as his legal guardian, and his belongings were put into storage. He entered the Central Islip State Hospital on Long Island on December 1, 1947, where he was treated for syphilis-induced paresis. He spent the last twenty-three years of his life there. He no longer painted after 1955 and died on April 13, 1970, of hemorrhaging of the pancreas. "His life's work was acquired in 1967 by the Smithsonian Institution's National Collection of Fine Arts (now Smithsonian American Art Museum), which organized his first museum retrospective in 1971, shortly after his death."

== Recognition ==
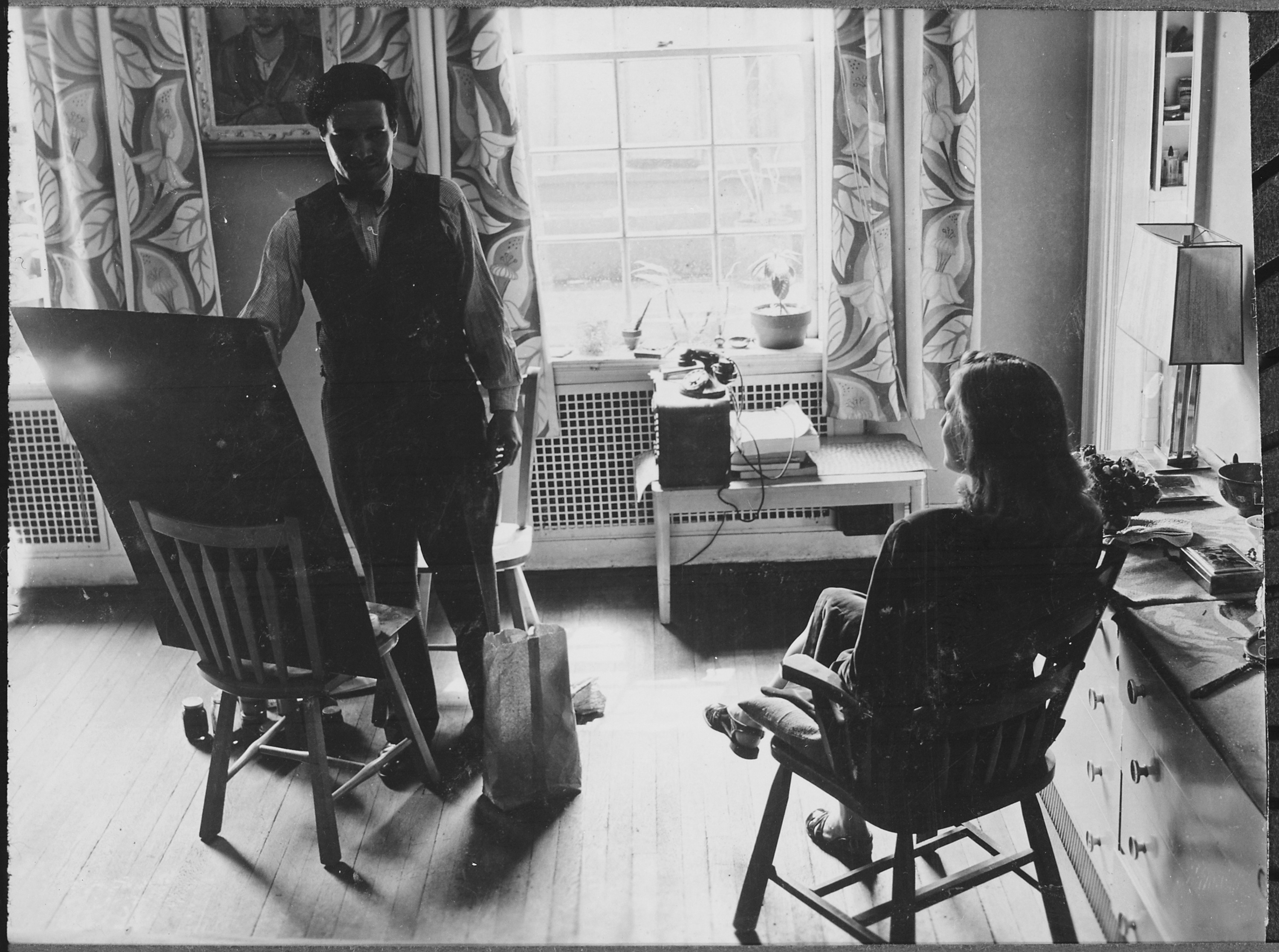
William Johnson at work, NARA

In 1956, Johnson's life's work was almost destroyed when his caretaker declared him unable to pay further storage fees for his life. Instead, Helen Harriton, Mary Beattie Brady, and others arranged with the court to have Johnson's belongings delivered to the Harmon Foundation with unconditional rights over all works. The foundation would use the works to advance interracial understanding and support African American achievements in the fine arts. On April 19, 1967, the Harmon Foundation gave more than 1,000 paintings, watercolors, and prints by Johnson to the Smithsonian American Art Museum. The Smithsonian maintains the largest and most complete collection of Johnson's work.

In 1991, the Smithsonian American Art Museum organized and circulated a major exhibition of his artwork, Homecoming: The Art and Life of William H. Johnson, and in 2006, they organized and circulated William H. Johnson's World on Paper. An expanded version of this exhibition traveled to the Amon Carter Museum in Fort Worth, Texas, the Philadelphia Museum of Art, and the Montgomery Museum of Fine Arts in Montgomery, Alabama in 2007.

The William H. Johnson Foundation for the Arts was established in 2001 in honor of the 100th birthday of William Johnson. Beginning with Laylah Ali in 2002, the Foundation has awarded the William H. Johnson Prize annual to an early career African American artist.

For the 2005 U.S. Postage stamp panel titled "To Form a More Perfect Union: Seeking Equal Rights for African Americans," art director Ethel Kessler used Johnson's 1941 silk-screen print Training for War to illustrate the segregation of American soldiers that preceded President Harry S. Truman's July 26, 1948 Executive Order 9981, mandating full integration in all branches of the U.S. military.

In 2012, the U.S. Postal Service issued a stamp in Johnson's honor, recognizing him as one of the nation's foremost African-American artists and a major figure in 20th-century American art. The stamp, the 11th in the "American Treasures" series, showcases his painting Flowers (1939–40), which depicts brightly colored blooms on a small red table.

On the afternoon of March 18, 2020, the city of Florence, South Carolina, unveiled a statue in remembrance of Johnson. It is located on West Evans Street Breezeway, of downtown Florence. "The statue was designed and created by sculptor, Alex Palkovich. Alex is a native of Ukraine, but made Florence home during his tenure as a CEO of GE Electric." The statue was created as a piece of commemoration to Johnson as a native artist of Florence and for his contributions through his artwork that were able to show the beauty of his city from within.

From November 20, 2020 – November 22, 2020, and May 14, 2021 – August 5, 2021, the Smithsonian American Art Museum hosted an exhibition "Dawoud Bey and William H. Johnson." The exhibit displayed Johnson’s Swing Low, Sweet Chariot.

In 2022, the Smithsonian American Art Museum organized, "Fighters for Freedom: William H. Johnson Picturing Justice", a multi-year traveling exhibition. The exhibit appeared at Gibbes Museum of Art, Albany Museum of Art, Oklahoma City Museum of Art, The Rockwell Museum, Wichita Art Museum, Smithsonian American Art Museum, Florence County Museum (Florence, South Carolina), Patricia and Phillip Frost Art Museum, Weatherspoon Art Museum, and Dayton Art Institute from 2022 to 2026.

== See also ==
- Women Builders (painting), oil on pasteboard 1945
