= First Baptist Church of Edgefield =

Baptist church in Edgefield, South Carolina, US

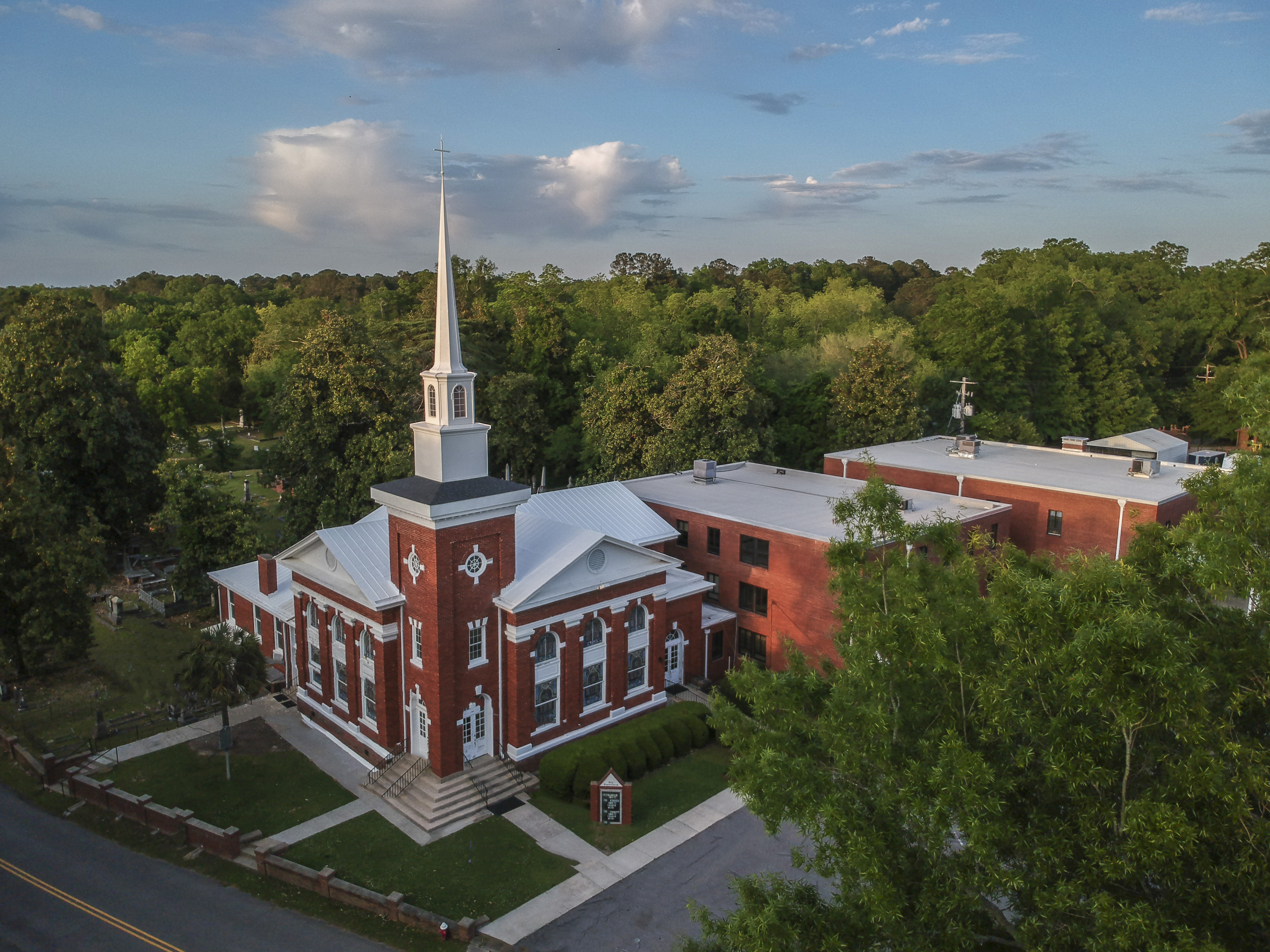
- First Baptist Church of Edgefield
- 33°47′27.9″N 81°55′39.2″W
- Location: South of Edgefield, near Edgefield, South Carolina
- Denomination: Baptist
- Website: edgefieldfbc.com

First Baptist Church of Edgefield (formerly the Edgefield Village Baptist Church and also known as Edgefield First Baptist Church) is a historic Baptist church located in Edgefield, South Carolina, United States. Established in 1823, the church has played a role in the religious and political history of the Edgefield region, notably through its connection to several prominent Southern figures and its role in the post-Civil War formation of local African American churches.

== History ==
The congregation was formally constituted in 1823 by its twenty-six charter members and has continuously operated since its founding. 11 of those 26 members came from the historic Horn Creek Baptist Church.

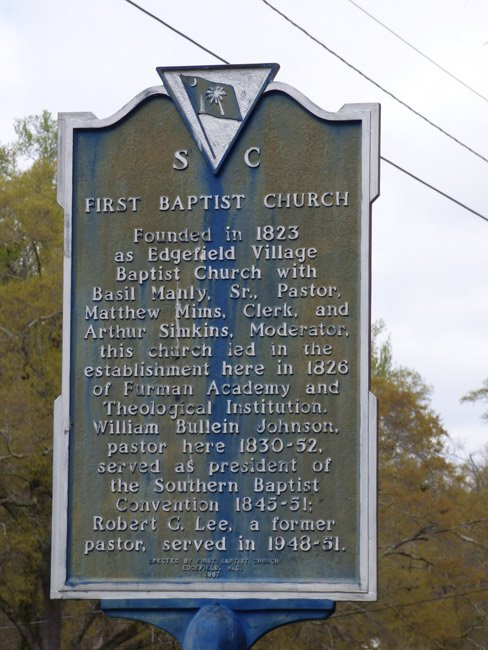

The first service was held on April 20, 1823 with Basil Manly Sr. presiding as the first pastor. Manly went on to help found the Southern Baptist Convention. In 1919, Dr. R. G Lee wrote his famous sermon “Payday Someday,” in the parsonage across the street from the church. Other notable pastors with connections to our church include; William Bullein Johnson, John Lake, and in 1951 Billy Graham preached at EFBC to a crowd of over 3000.

Due to an increase in membership, the original building was torn down and a new building was built in 1888. However, tragedy befell the church on June 25, 1913 when lightning struck the steeple and that second structure burned to the ground. The present sanctuary was then built, and the first service was held in the new building Sunday, September 27, 1914.

Prior to the American Civil War, the church followed the common Southern practice of enrolling both white and black members. In August 1867, shortly after emancipation, the church’s rolls included 170 white members and 187 black members. Following the war, the African American membership sought to establish independent congregations. In December 1866, 21 former slaves were formally dismissed from the church to establish the Simmons Ridge Baptist Church. Other former members later helped found the Macedonia Baptist Church following 1867.

== Notable figures ==
=== Basil Manly Sr. ===
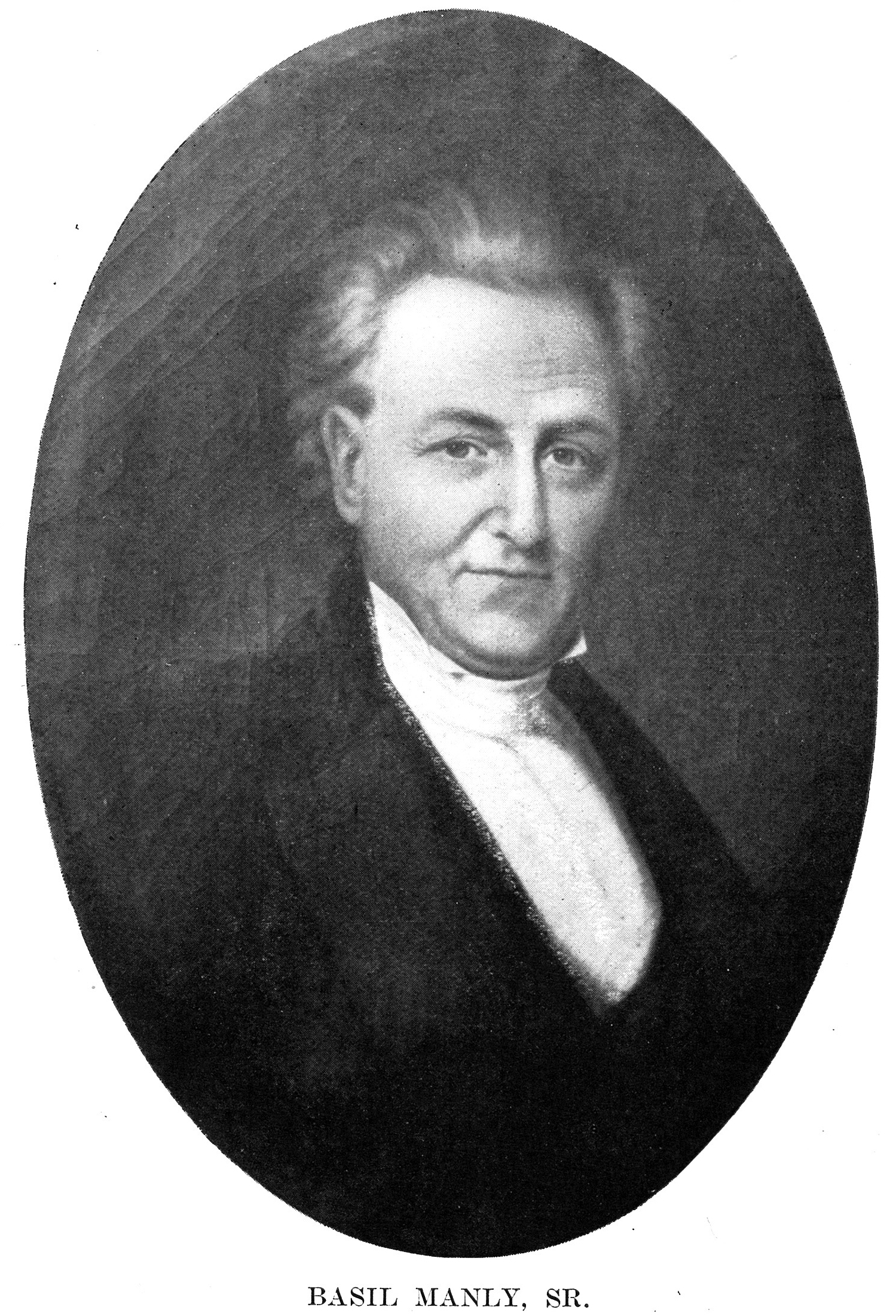

Basil Manly Sr. (1798–1868), the church's first pastor (1823–1826), was an influential Baptist minister and educator. He played a key role in establishing the Furman Academy and Theological Institution in Edgefield in 1826, the predecessor to Furman University.

On April 26, 1818, he received his license to preach from the Baptist Church of Christ at Rocky Springs, North Carolina. He became the beneficiary of the Southern Education Society, Coosawhatchie, South Carolina, on May 17, 1818. The following day, he preached his first regular sermon at the Baptist Meeting House in Beaufort, South Carolina. The following year, in December 1819, he was admitted to the senior class at South Carolina College, Columbia, South Carolina. Manly graduated valedictorian on December 3, 1821. On March 10, 1822, he was ordained at Little Stevens Creek Church, Edgefield County, South Carolina by John Landrum and Enoch Braziel. Manly was elected the pastor of Little Stevens Creek after his ordination and served until 1825. He also pastored Edgefield Village Baptist Church during this time.

Manly was also a central figure in the founding of the Southern Baptist Convention (SBC) in 1845, and later served as president of the University of Alabama.

=== William Bullein Johnson ===
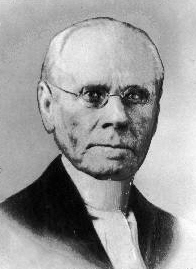
William Bullein Johnson

William Bullein Johnson (1782–1862) served as pastor for two terms (1830–1845, 1845–1852). Johnson was a monumental figure in Southern Baptist life, serving as the first president of the Southern Baptist Convention from 1845 to 1851. He also helped found the South Carolina State Baptist Convention and was a pioneer in higher education for women, establishing the Johnson Female Seminary (later Anderson University (South Carolina)).

Johnson was born on June 13, 1782, on Johns Island, South Carolina, near Charleston and was educated at home in Georgetown, South Carolina by his mother and by private tutors. His mother was of the Particular Baptist faith, believing that the redemptive work of Christ only applied to those who were saved. As a child he met President George Washington and Richard Furman, pastor of the First Baptist Church Charleston, who made a great impression on him. He attended Brown University, receiving a degree in 1804. He had intended to become a lawyer, but was converted during a Baptist revival in 1804, and devoted the rest of his life to Christian service. He married Henrietta Hornby in 1803.

Johnson was one of nine men who formed the South Carolina State Baptist Convention in 1821. He succeeded Richard Furman as president of the convention and served from 1825 to 1852. In 1830, he moved to Edgefield to become the principal of Edgefield Female Academy and the pastor of First Baptist.

=== R. G. Lee ===
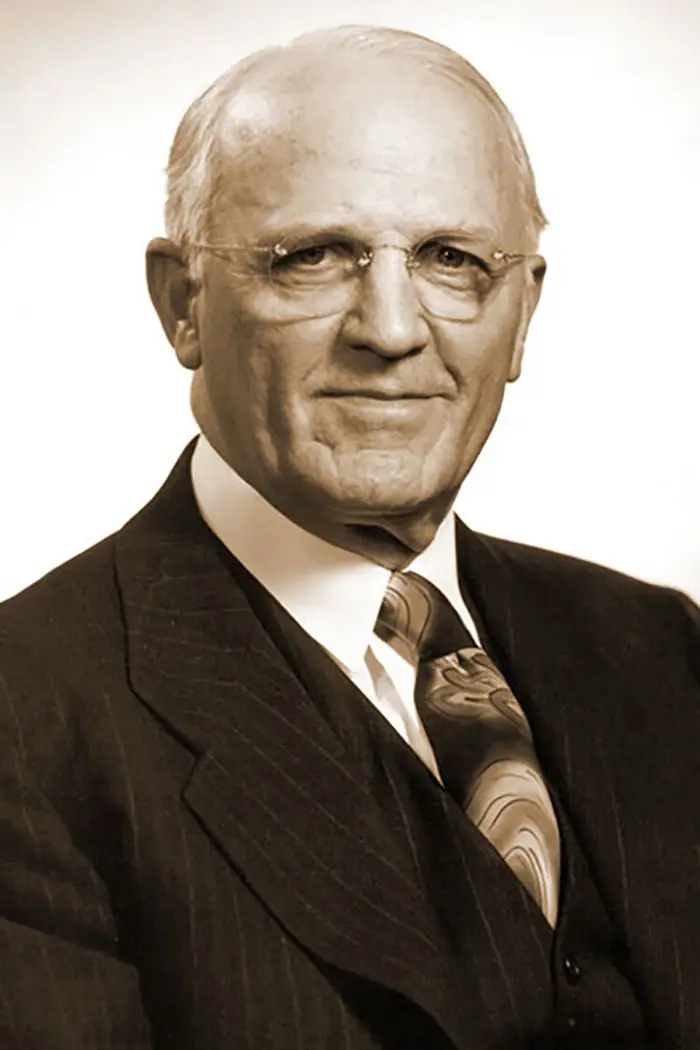
Robert G. Lee

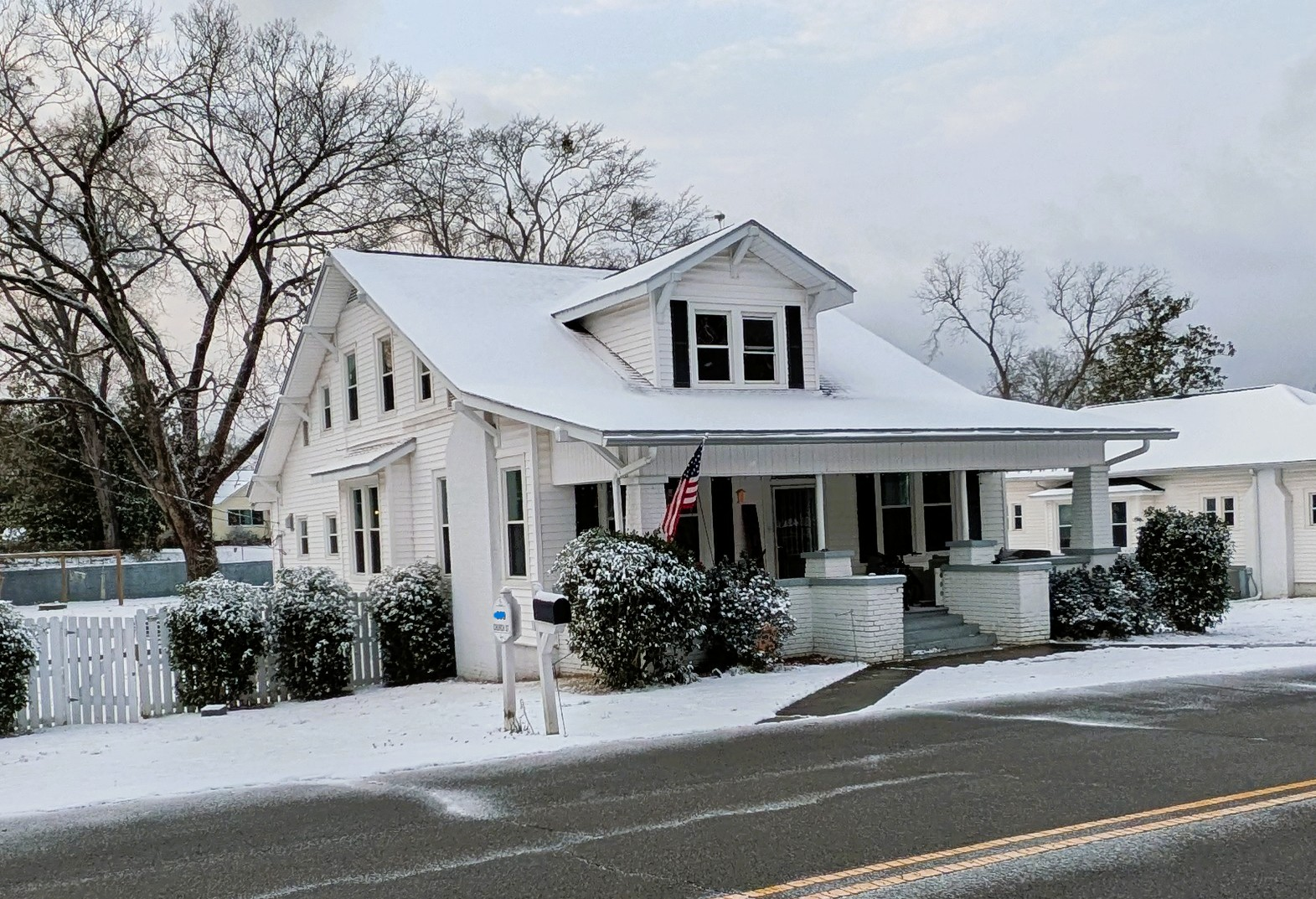
R.G. Lee Parsonage at Edgefield First Baptist

Pastor R. G. Lee, best known for his influential and widely preached sermon "Payday Someday," served as a pastor at the church in the early 20th century before moving to Bellevue Baptist Church in Memphis, Tennessee. Lee wrote his famous sermon in the First Baptist parsonage that he built across the street. The parsonage is still in use today.

Lee was born in a log cabin on November 11, 1886. The son of a South Carolina sharecropper, he worked his way through school, ultimately graduating with a doctorate in international law from University of Chicago Law School in 1919.

After preaching a message from 1 Kings 21 at a prayer meeting at First Baptist, a deacon walked up and exclaimed, "You’ve got something there, my boy. Why don’t you make a full-length sermon out of it? I think it is wonderful.” Lee stayed up until 2 am at the parsonage working on the sermon that would become his most famous, "Payday Someday." Lee preached the sermon more than 1,200 times at Bible conferences, in state capitol buildings, churches, universities, youth camps, and ballparks across the nation and around the world.

At the time of his death on July 20, 1978, an estimated 3 million people had heard him preach "Pay-Day Someday". To accommodate the crowds that came to hear Lee preach the hour-long sermon each year on the first Sunday in May, Bellevue moved services to Ellis Auditorium in Memphis. In 1954, Westminster Films captured him in Technicolor delivering his signature sermon. Lee authored 56 books, written primarily from his sermons.

=== Strom Thurmond ===
Strom Thurmond, former Governor of South Carolina and a long-serving U.S. Senator, grew up as a member of Edgefield First Baptist Church. His birthplace and childhood home is less than a mile from the church. Throughout his youth, he was active in the church and served in leadership roles, including as the Sunday School Superintendent. Thurmond is buried in the graveyard behind the church.

=== List of former pastors ===
The following is a list of the pastors who have served the congregation since its founding:

- Basil Manly Sr. (1823–1826)
- Joseph A. Warne (1827–1828)
- William B. Johnson (1830–1845)
- J. M. Chiles (1845)
- William B. Johnson (1845–1852)
- C. A. Raymond (1853–1854)
- R. L. Whaley (1854–1856)
- E. L. Whaley (1858–1868)
- Luther Broaddus (1869–1875)
- W. J. Alexander (1875–1877)
- W. T. Hundley (1878–1882)
- H. A. Whitman (1882–1886)
- T. D. Clark (1886–1888)
- G. L. Hunt (1888–1890)
- J. N. Booth (1891–1893)
- L. R. Gwalney (1893–1902)
- C. E. Burts (1903–1911)
- M. D. Jeffries (1911–1914)
- E. Pendleton Jones (1915–1918)
- R. G. Lee (1918–1921)
- Arthur T. Allen (1921–1926)
- Walter L. Coker (1927–1928)
- B. W. Thomason (1929–1940)
- J. F. Burris (1940–1943)
- P. H. Anderson, Jr. (1944–1945)
- John S. Wimbish (1945–1950)
- H. M. Kinlaw (1950–1955)
- Lewis McCormick (1956–1958)
- J. Graydon Dukes (1958–1963)
- B. Conrad Johnston (1963–1970)
- Tom Collins (1971–1974)
- William Harris (1975–1977)
- James G. Revels (1978–1982)
- Michael L. Glenn (1982–1987)
- W. Richard Kremer (1987–1991)
- Tony Hopkins (1992–2002)
- Keith Goretzka (2002–2004)
- Stacy Williams (2005–2015)
- Aaron Tripp (2016–)

== Architecture ==
The church structure is prominently featured in the town of Edgefield. It has a neoclassical architectural style typical of 19th-century Southern churches.
