= William Bullein Johnson =

American pastor (1782–1862)

The Reverend William Bullein Johnson
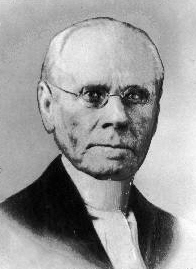
- Born: June 13, 1782; John's Island, South Carolina, U.S.
- Died: October 2, 1862 (aged 80)
- Education: Brown University
- Occupation: Baptist pastor
- Known for: First president of the Southern Baptist Convention

William Bullein Johnson (June 13, 1782 – October 2, 1862) was an American Baptist minister, one of the founders of the South Carolina State Baptist Convention in 1821, and later was the first president of the Southern Baptist Convention from 1845 to 1851. Johnson is also the founder of Johnson Female Seminary, later renamed Johnson University, in 1848, the predecessor to Anderson University.

== Early years ==
Johnson was born on June 13, 1782, on John's Island, South Carolina, near Charleston and was educated at home in Georgetown, South Carolina by his mother and by private tutors. His mother was of the Particular Baptist faith, believing that the redemptive work of Christ only applied to those who were saved. As a child he met President George Washington and Dr. Richard Furman, pastor of the First Baptist Church Charleston, who made a great impression on him. He attended Brown University, receiving a degree in 1804. He had intended to become a lawyer, but was converted during a Baptist revival in 1804, and devoted the rest of his life to Christian service. He married Henrietta Hornby in 1803. One of their eight children who reached maturity, Francis C. Johnson, became a Southern Baptist missionary to China in 1846.

== Baptist leader ==
After preaching in several churches from 1804 to 1806, Johnson was appointed pastor of the Baptist church at Euhaw near Beaufort, South Carolina. In October 1809 he baptized five new converts in the Congaree River in Columbia, SC. Later that day he organized First Baptist Church Columbia with these 5 new converts and 7 other local Baptists, under the leadership of Jonathan Maxcy, first president of the University of South Carolina and ordained Baptist preacher. In 1810 he was invited to become chaplain of South Carolina College, Columbia. In 1811 he accepted an offer to become pastor of the Baptist church in Savannah, Georgia. It was here that Johnson met Luther Rice, who interested him in foreign missions, and whom he helped establish the General Missionary Convention of the Baptist Denomination in the United States of America for Foreign Missions, or Triennial Convention, in 1814. He was one of the framers of the constitution of this convention. His theology was shaped by Fullerite Edwardsean thinking.

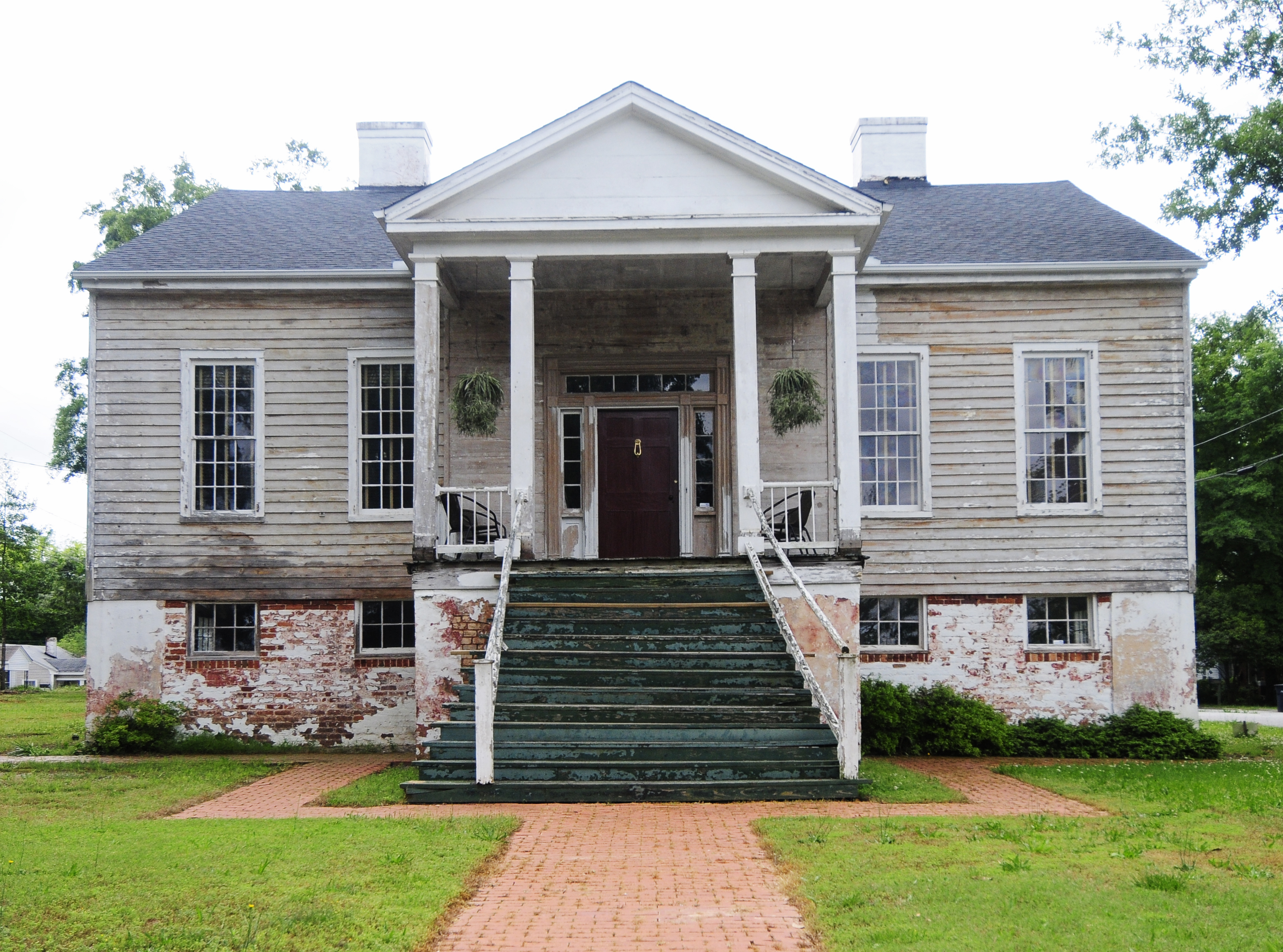
The Caldwell-Johnson-Morris Cottage home of William Johnson in Anderson, South Carolina.

Returning to South Carolina, after serving again as pastor of the Columbia church Johnson moved to Greenville, South Carolina where he was principal of Greenville Female Academy, and founded a Baptist church in the town. Johnson was one of nine men who formed the South Carolina State Baptist Convention in 1821. He succeeded Richard Furman as president of the convention and served from 1825 to 1852. In 1830 he moved to Edgefield to become principal of Edgefield Female Academy and pastor of First Baptist Church of Edgefield.

Johnson became the last southern president of the Triennial Convention between 1841 and 1844. As tensions grew between the missionary societies and southern churches over the issue of slavery, he attempted to avoid a split. However in May 1845 most southern churches split from the Triennial Convention to arrange their own organization: the Southern Baptist Convention. Johnson was asked become first president of the breakaway Southern Baptist Convention, and he accepted, serving until 1851. In this role he helped found the Furman University, which became Southern Baptist Theological Seminary in 1859, based in Greenville, South Carolina. Towards the end of his life he was chancellor of Johnson University, Anderson, South Carolina (1853–58).

== Johnson University (1848–1858) ==
The period between the American Revolution and the Civil War marks a period of dramatic increase in the number of institutions providing higher education. In noting the part Baptists played in the movement, historian J. Bradley Creed called it a "cottage industry" due to the number of Baptist institutions established during the period. W.B. Johnson was among the Baptist leaders in the expansion. His vision for Baptist higher education went further than the more conventional schools of the time; his dream was such a school for women. The earliest schools for women were called "seminaries" and were places where they were trained as teachers. Few of these schools existed when Johnson Female Seminary was founded in Anderson, South Carolina in 1848. The principals of the Seminary were Mary E. Daniel, also known for her collecting of reptile specimens and her aunt Phoebe Paine with Charlotte Paine, also a collector of reptile specimens, being the vice principal. Later known as Johnson University, the institution did not survive Johnson's death and the onset of the Civil War. The legacy of Johnson University continued, however. Its presence in the community left a lasting impression on the local young people of that day. As the late Anderson College professor, Charles S. Sullivan, said, "the continuity that runs through the life of a community from one generation to the next is expressed in cultural traditions as well as in visible institutions. Shortly after the turn of the century, those who fondly remembered the impact that Johnson University had on the community developed a compelling vision of resurrecting the institution in the form of Anderson College which later became Anderson University. The home in which Rev. Johnson lived in the City of Anderson was still standing as of 2014. His portrait hangs in perpetuity in the Truett Cathy Old Common Room in Merritt Hall on the Anderson University campus.

== Bibliography ==
- William Bullein Johnson (1846). The gospel developed through the government and order of the churches of Jesus Christ. H.K. Ellyson.

== See also ==
- List of Southern Baptist Convention affiliated people
- Southern Baptist Convention
- Southern Baptist Convention Presidents
- William Bullein Johnson Papers - Furman University Special Collections

Preceded by none	President of the Southern Baptist Convention; 1845–1851	Succeeded by R. B. C. Howell
