= Annie Dove Denmark =

American educator (1887–1974)

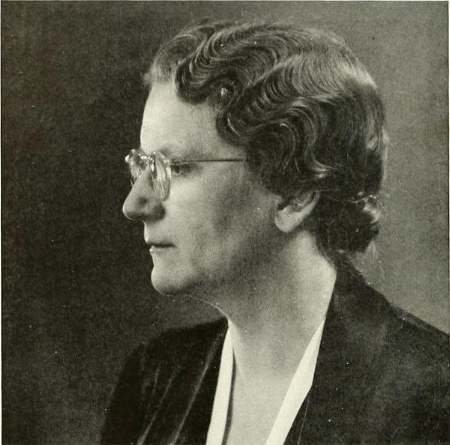
- Denmark, c. 1942

5th President of Anderson College
- In office January 1, 1928 – May 22, 1953
- Preceded by: John E. White
- Succeeded by: Elmer Francis Haight

Personal details
- Born: September 29, 1887 Goldsboro, North Carolina, U.S.
- Died: January 16, 1974 (aged 86) Goldsboro, North Carolina, U.S.
- Resting place: Willow Dale Cemetery; Goldsboro, North Carolina, U.S.
- Education: Baptist University for Women; Anderson College (AB)

Annie Dove Denmark (September 29, 1887 – January 16, 1974) was an American music educator and academic administrator who was the fifth president of Anderson College (now Anderson University) in Anderson, South Carolina, from 1928 to 1953.

A talented musician in her youth, Denmark attended the Baptist University for Women (now Meredith College) and graduated with an artist's diploma in piano in 1908. She began her teaching career later the same year. For a period of eight years thereafter, she taught piano at Buies Creek Academy, the Tennessee College for Women, and Shorter College. She continued her studies as her career began; she spent the summer of 1909 in New York City studying under Rafael Joseffy, the 1916–1917 academic year studying under Alberto Jonás, and many successive summers during her time at Anderson attending the Chautauqua Institute. She began teaching at Anderson at the start of the 1917–1918 academic year. After the resignation of Anderson president John E. White in September 1927, her name was put forward as a potential successor and she had gained the full support of the trustees by December of that year.

Denmark took office as Anderson's fifth president in January 1928; she is commonly cited as the first woman president of a college or university in South Carolina, though this claim is incorrect. Taking on the school's substantial debt, she guided the school through the Great Depression and oversaw Anderson's transition from a four-year college to a two-year junior college, the first of its kind in the state. The remainder of the college's debt was paid off by the South Carolina Baptist Convention in May 1938, and attendance increased as World War II ended and the school enrolled more men than it ever had since becoming co-educational in 1931. She announced her resignation in April 1952 and ultimately left office in May 1953 following that year's commencement, concluding a 25-year presidency that remains the longest in Anderson's history. She was promptly elected president emeritus by the trustees and given an apartment on campus, though she instead retired to her hometown of Goldsboro, North Carolina, where she lived until her death in 1974.

She was the recipient of multiple honors during her life and following her death: Furman University awarded her an honorary degree in 1941, Anderson established the Denmark Society and the Annie Dove Denmark award in 1944 and 1976, respectively, she was made the namesake of a dormitory building on campus in 1966, and was inducted into the Anderson County Museum Hall of Fame in 2004.

== Early life and education ==
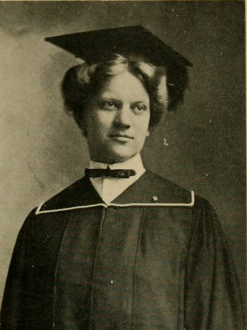
Denmark, c. 1908, as a senior at Baptist University for Women

Annie Denmark was born in Goldsboro, North Carolina, on September 29, 1887, the fourth of five children (Note: Denmark had an older sister who died in infancy. She had two older brothers and one younger brother who survived to adulthood, so in some sources she is noted as being the third of four children.) born to Sara Emma (née Boyette) and Willis Arthur Denmark. Her family had lived in Goldsboro for some time before her birth; her father moved there several years prior to the Civil War and was the tax collector for Wayne County for 33 years. In addition to being an alderman in the town, he was co-founder of a church where he was superintendent of the Sunday school and a deacon. Sara was Willis's second wife; his first wife, Clarissa Boyette, was Sara's sister and had died about two years after the birth of their first and only child. Willis and Sara married eleven months following Clarissa's death. Annie was raised with close ties to the church; she was later described by the Anderson University historian Hubert Hester as a "gifted student" in music, even playing organ at her church between 1897, at the age of ten, until 1908. She received her high school diploma in 1904 from the Goldsboro public schools and enrolled at the Baptist University for Women (BUW) in Raleigh, North Carolina, later the same year.

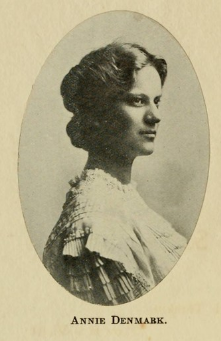
Denmark in her 1908 yearbook photo as literary society president

While at BUW, which changed its name to Meredith College the year after Denmark graduated, she was the president of a literary society for a year and was a member of the student council. One of her instructors there was Grace Louise Cronkhite, who later became her close friend and was dean of music at Anderson, in addition to teaching piano, organ, and music theory, during her presidency. Denmark gave her graduating piano recital on April 22, 1908, and received an artist's diploma in piano a short time later. She continued to take instruction from Cronkhite for a year following her graduation. She also took graduate courses at Columbia University.

== Career ==
=== Teaching career and start at Anderson, 1908–1927 ===
Denmark accepted her first teaching position in 1908, shortly after her graduation from college, and taught during the 1908–1909 academic year at Buies Creek Academy—now Campbell University—in Buies Creek, North Carolina. One student that she taught at Buies Creek was Bessie Campbell, the daughter of J. A. Campbell, later made the namesake of the school. Denmark received a monthly salary of $45 (equivalent to $1,610 in 2025) in this position and spent $9 monthly (equivalent to $320 in 2025) on board. This salary was sufficient to send her to New York City during the summer of 1909, where she studied under pianist and teacher Rafael Joseffy. She then moved to Murfreesboro, Tennessee, where she taught for one year at the Tennessee College for Women as the piano instructor, and afterwards took the same position at Shorter College—now Shorter University—in Rome, Georgia, where she stayed from 1910 to 1916. In addition to teaching piano at Shorter, she taught a Sunday school class for young women at the Fifth Avenue Baptist Church in Rome. During the 1916–1917 academic year, she traveled back to New York to study at the Virgil Piano School under Alberto Jonás. She joined the faculty of Anderson College—now Anderson University—in Anderson, South Carolina, as the instructor of piano and harmony in 1917. For her first eight years at Anderson, she held a role as director of religious activities in addition to teaching. While teaching at Anderson, she continued her own studies. For many summers she traveled to Chautauqua, New York, to attend the Chautauqua Institute, (Note: Hester (1969) says that Denmark "attended Chatauqua Institute at Chatauqua, New York, [sic] for 12 summers altogether", though her obituary from The State says that she attended only from 1921–1927 and then again in 1933 and Copeland (2011) says that she attended for twenty years.) and she took classes outside of her teaching schedule at Anderson during the school year. She eventually earned her Bachelor of Arts degree from Anderson in 1925. (Note: Most sources agree that she earned her degree from Anderson in 1925, though Copeland (2011) says "The 1926 graduating class of Anderson College lists the name of Annie Dove Denmark.") That same year, she was appointed dean of women by President John E. White, a position she kept for three years.

White resigned as president of Anderson effective September 1, 1927, leaving the position vacant. A committee formed from three members of the school's Board of Trustees was created in order to name his successor. R. H. Holliday, the business manager of the school, was named acting president in the intervening three months while the new permanent president was being selected. Denmark was not the first choice of the Board of Trustees: Charles E. Burts and R. C. Burts, brothers who were both from Newberry, South Carolina, each refused the job, and A. J. Barton, from Nashville, Tennessee, could not agree to terms with the board and therefore did not take the job either. Though little is known about the exact events that led to Denmark's election, it is known that her name was put forward for consideration by college trustee J. Dexter Brown and that the Board of Trustees were in unanimous support of her appointment to the presidency when asked at their meeting on December 15, 1927.

=== President of Anderson College, 1928–1953 ===
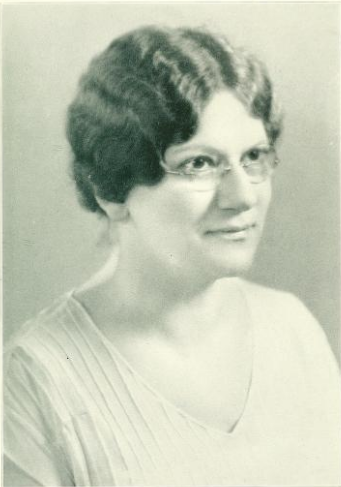
Denmark pictured in the 1930 edition of The Sororian, the final yearbook published by Anderson as a women's college

Denmark took office and became Anderson's fifth president on January 1, 1928. (Note: There is some slight disagreement among sources regarding the year that Denmark relinquished her position as dean of women; Hester (1969) and her obituary published by The State say that she was not in the role when she accepted the presidency (the former says she left the position in 1928 and the latter in 1926), though a story by The News & Observer published in 1929 states that she kept the position upon becoming president.) In doing so, she became the school's second lay president. She is sometimes referred to as the first woman college president in South Carolina, though she was predated in this distinction by Euphemia McClintock some 26 years earlier. Denmark was formally inaugurated as president just over a year later, on February 14, 1929. Her inauguration ceremony was well-attended by leaders in higher education throughout the southeast. She marked the occasion of her inauguration by declaring that day to be the inaugural observation of the college's annual Founders Day, recognizing the anniversary of the granting of the college charter on February 14, 1911. The Founders Day ceremony was often accompanied by a guest speaker, including people such as Clemson University President E. Walter Sikes and South Carolina First Lady Gladys Atkinson Johnston, an Anderson graduate and the wife of Governor Olin D. Johnston. Denmark inherited the college's debt of $60,000 (equivalent to $863,000 in 2024) upon taking office, as well as the school's lack of an endowment. She spoke three times to the Board of Trustees at meetings between January and May 1928, concluding one speech with the line, "What are you trustees willing to sacrifice for Anderson College?", and then pledging a gift of $5,000 (equivalent to $71,900 in 2024) to the school, to be paid over the next few years.

As the school entered the 1930s and the Great Depression, it fought to maintain membership in the Southern Association of Colleges and Schools, which required members to have an endowment of no less than $500,000 (equivalent to $7,451,000 in 2024), of which Anderson at this point had built up not even one-fifth. This, among other reasons, contributed to a decision by Denmark and the trustees to convert Anderson to a junior college. The trustees voted in favor of this plan, and it was brought before the Baptist State Convention on December 4, 1929, at their meeting in Spartanburg. It was approved after much debate. Anderson opened its doors as a junior college for the first time at the start of the 1930–1931 academic year, making it the first junior college in the state. The college became co-educational the following year, admitting its first male students in 1931. Two years following the switch, enrollment had increased by 27 percent. The college reported a total of 199 enrolled students in 1931–1932. Around this time she published White Echoes, a collection of sermons preached by her predecessor, John E. White, during his time in charge of Anderson's First Baptist Church.

Much of the administration's attention was focused on the school's financial troubles and the establishment of a college radio broadcasting station for the next several years. The debt grew larger as the middle of the decade neared and in 1935–1936 the college was paying $3,600 (equivalent to $64,600 in 2024) yearly in interest alone to the Hibernia Trust Company. Denmark and the trustees planned a large dinner to spur the fundraising campaign on April 6, 1936, though the dinner was canceled after an F2 tornado—one that was part of a larger outbreak over the course of that and the previous day—struck the city of Anderson that afternoon resulting in thirty injuries in addition to the loss of two mills and several homes and farms in town. The college did, however, collect $20,000 (equivalent to $354,000 in 2024) as a result of their storm insurance policy, which went towards restoring the heating plant and other general refurbishments. The school administration won a significant victory two years later when, on May 23, 1938, the South Carolina Baptist Convention assisted in paying the remainder of Anderson's debt, bringing many of the school's financial woes to a close.

Enrollment climbed over the next few years and spiked noticeably after World War II; 42 of 53 men that enrolled at Anderson in 1946–1947 were veterans, largely a result of the G.I. Bill, and the school enrolled a record 409 students that academic year in total. Denmark helped to increase pay for Anderson faculty on multiple occasions: in May 1944, she recommended a "slight increase" in their salaries and introduced a salary bonus in March 1946. The college, still in some need of funds and a stable endowment, received $60,000 (equivalent to $734,000 in 2024) from the Baptist State Convention sometime between 1946 and 1947, which was used to modernize some of the campus's buildings. In 1944, she worked with school administration to implement an honor code for the college under which students would be tried by their classmates, though some infractions (such as alcohol possession) meant a student would be subject to expulsion with no debate. Throughout her presidency, she kept close the college's ties with the church, as chapel attendance remained a requirement for all students, five days a week, up to and through her resignation.

At a meeting of the Board of Trustees on April 23, 1952, Denmark announced her resignation as president of the college, saying,

I am herewith tendering to you as representing the Baptist State Convention of South Carolina, my resignation to take effect on January 1, 1953, or as soon thereafter as my successor can be found.

This date represented the 25th anniversary, to the day, of the beginning of her term, though her successor was ultimately not found until several months later. In her letter, she referenced the school's freedom from debt and good prospects for future financial support as well as her desire to allow the new president enough time to prepare for the next academic year. The trustees were quite surprised by this request and did not accept her resignation until the conclusion of the meeting, when she insisted that they do so. She gave her final president's report on January 22, 1953; at the same meeting, president-elect Elmer Francis Haight was introduced to the trustees. "Denmark Day" was celebrated on Founders Day of that year—February 14, 1953—during which the retiring president was honored by many former students and other guests of the college. Her official duties as president came to a close following the commencement exercises of May 22, 1953. Haight began his duties as Anderson's sixth president the following month.

During her presidency, Denmark held a number of other positions within higher education: she led the Southern Association of Colleges for Women as its president from 1934 to 1935, was a member of the Board of Trustees of the Southern Baptist Women's Missionary Union Training School in Louisville, Kentucky, and was the first woman to hold an office in the Baptist State Convention when she was its vice president in 1950.

== Later life and death ==
On Denmark's final day as president, the college's trustees elected her president emeritus and extended her an invitation to remain living on campus for the rest of her life. While she accepted the position, she opted to return to her hometown of Goldsboro. She assumed several hobbies in her retirement, including collecting Madonnas and watching baseball. After suffering declining health for several months, she died on the morning of January 16, 1974, at Wayne Memorial Hospital in Goldsboro, at the age of 86. She never married and left no immediate family. Memorial services were held the following day at First Baptist Church in Goldsboro and in Anderson's auditorium. She was buried in Goldsboro's Willow Dale Cemetery.

== Legacy ==
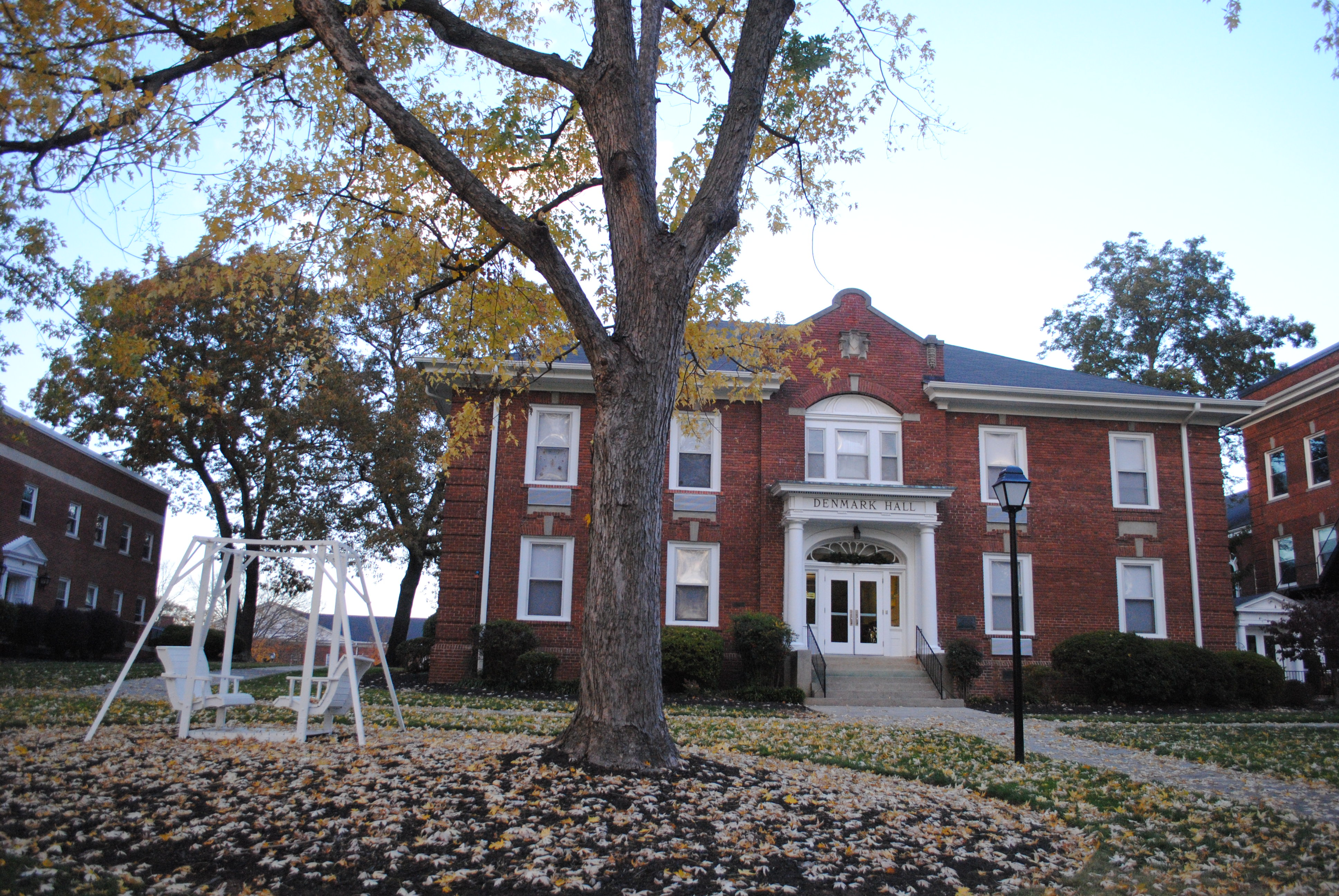
Denmark is the namesake of Denmark Hall (pictured in 2016), a dormitory on Anderson's campus.

On June 2, 1941, Furman University conferred upon Denmark the honorary Doctor of Letters degree at their commencement exercises. In 1944, during her presidency, the Denmark Society was established, which honored "outstanding graduates" of the college. Similarly, the Annie Dove Denmark Award is bestowed as Anderson's highest honor to non-alumni and was established in 1976. She received a certificate of service at Anderson’s commencement in May 1961, along with her successor Elmer Francis Haight, as part of the school's fiftieth anniversary celebrations. West Dormitory, a dormitory building on Anderson's campus originally built in 1911 and in which Denmark resided during her tenure, was renamed Denmark Hall in her honor in 1966. She was the subject of an original biographical play produced by Anderson entitled The Denmark Story. It was supported by a grant given by South Carolina Humanities in 2010 and showed in September 2010 at Anderson's Daniel Recital Hall, after which it toured around the state during winter 2011. She was honored as an inductee into the Anderson County Museum's Hall of Fame in 2004, alongside five others. Due to her contributions to the life of the college and the city as a whole, she was sometimes referred to as "the first citizen of Anderson"; many letters written to her were addressed to "Dr. Anderson". Her 25-year presidency is the longest in the college's history.
