= Richard Furman =

American Baptist leader (1755–1825)

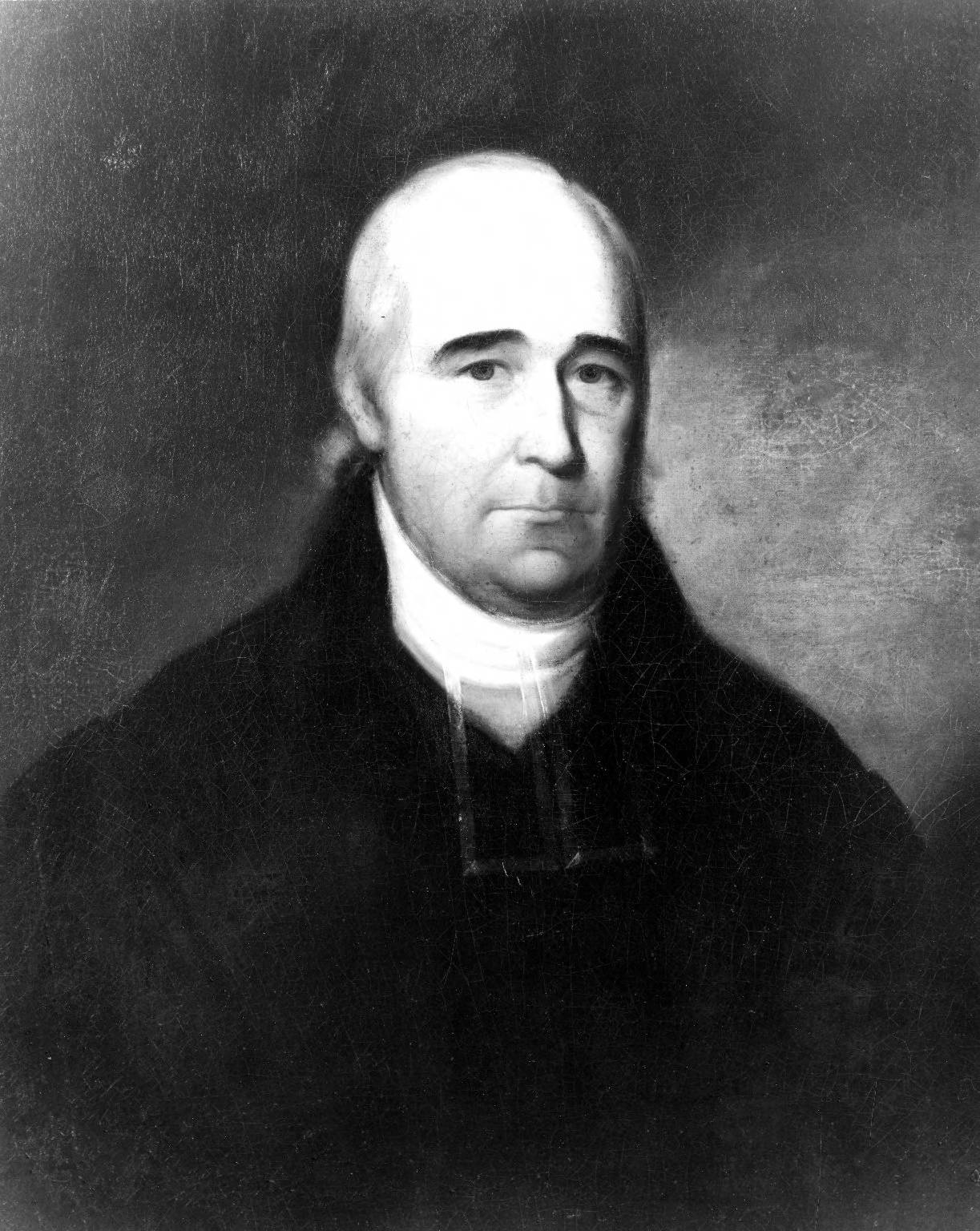
- Born: October 9, 1755; Esopus, Province of New York, British America
- Died: August 25, 1825 (aged 69); Charleston, South Carolina, U.S.
- Occupation: Minister
- Known for: First president of the Triennial Convention

Richard Furman (October 9, 1755 – August 25, 1825) was an American Baptist leader from Charleston, South Carolina. He was elected in 1814 as the first president of the Triennial Convention (now American Baptist Churches USA). He later served as the first president of the South Carolina State Baptist Convention.

== Early years ==
Furman was born in Esopus, New York. He was raised in Charleston, South Carolina, in a family of evangelical Calvinists. He had little formal education, but was taught mathematics and sciences by his father and taught himself several languages including Latin, Greek and Hebrew. Through his self-directed studies, he also gained extensive knowledge of history, theology, and medicine. Furman accepted the Baptist faith in 1771 aged 16, and began to preach at that early age. He was ordained as pastor of High Hills church two years later.

During the American War of Independence (1775–1783), Furman volunteered to serve in the colonial army, but was persuaded that his talents could better be used as a speaker in gaining support for the cause. On the fall of Charleston to British forces in 1780, General Charles Cornwallis announced a £1,000 bounty for his capture, and he was forced to flee the state.

== Baptist leader ==
After the war, Furman was a proponent of the constitutional clauses that ensured freedom of worship and removed all special privileges from the Episcopal church. In 1786 he became pastor of the Charleston Baptist Church, holding this post for the rest of his life. He made a great impression on the young William Bullein Johnson, who would later himself become a Baptist leader and first president of the Southern Baptist Convention. As moderator of the Charleston Baptist association, he arranged for funding for the education of young ministers and for funding of missionary activity in the state. Furman was a founder of the Charleston Bible Society and the Religious Tract Society. Rhode Island College (later Brown University) awarded him an honorary master's degree in 1792 and Doctor of Divinity Degree in 1800.

In 1814, Furman helped arrange the first meeting of the Triennial Convention in Philadelphia, where he was elected president. He was re-elected president in 1817. Furman ensured that the convention made education of aspiring ministers one of its basic missions, and encouraged Luther Rice in the foundation of Columbian College, now George Washington University, chartered by an Act of Congress on February 9, 1821. In 1821, Furman was one of the organizers of the South Carolina State Baptist Convention and was elected its president, serving until his death. Furman University, the South's first Baptist college, was founded in 1826 and named in his honor.

== Marriage and family ==
Furman married Elizabeth Haynsworth in November 1772, and they had four children before her death in 1787: a son who died at birth, Rachel, Wood, and Richard (died in infancy).

In May 1789 Furman married Dorothea Burn, and this marriage produced thirteen children: Richard, Samuel, John Gano (died in infancy), Josiah, Charles Manning, Maria Dorothea, Henry Hart, Sarah Susanne, John Gano (2nd), Thomas Fuller, James Clement, Anne Eliza, and William. His son James Clement Furman (1809–1891), also a Baptist minister, was Furman University's first president.

== Views on slavery ==
As a young man he opposed slavery, but later he became a slave owner and came to support the practice on both economic and moral grounds. In 1822, he published an "Exposition of the Views of the Baptists Relative to the Coloured Population of the United States", which set out the arguments that Southerners would use to defend slavery until the Thirteenth Amendment to the United States Constitution (1865) finally put an end to slavery in the United States.

== See also ==
- Baptist
- Slavery
- Southern Baptists
