= Anderson University (South Carolina) =

Baptist university in Anderson, South Carolina, US

- Former name: Anderson College (1911–2006)
- Motto: Humanitatem per crucem alere (Latin)
- Motto in English: To nourish humanity through the cross
- Type: Private university
- Established: 1911; 115 years ago
- Accreditation: SACS
- Religious affiliation: South Carolina Baptist Convention (Southern Baptist Convention)
- Endowment: $49.1 million (2025)
- President: Evans P. Whitaker
- Faculty: 189 full-time, 233 part-time (fall 2021)
- Students: 4,325 (fall 2023)
- Undergraduates: 3,413
- Postgraduates: 912
- Location: Anderson, South Carolina, United States; 34°30′54″N 82°38′24″W
- Campus: 305 acres (123 ha), 36 buildings
- Colors: Gold, black, & red
- Nickname: Trojans
- Sporting affiliations: NCAA Division II – SAC
- Mascot: Troy the Trojan
- Website: andersonuniversity.edu

Anderson University is a private university in Anderson, South Carolina, United States. It offers bachelor's, master's, and doctoral degrees in over 100 areas of study. Anderson is affiliated with the South Carolina Baptist Convention and is accredited by the Commission on Colleges of the Southern Association of Colleges and Schools. Anderson participates in NCAA Division II athletics and is a member of the South Atlantic Conference.

Reestablished in 1911 as Anderson College, it is the successor to Johnson University, which was founded in 1848 by W. B. Johnson. Anderson was initially a female college until 1931 when it became coed. In 2006, it was renamed Anderson University. It consists of eleven distinct colleges and schools.

== History ==
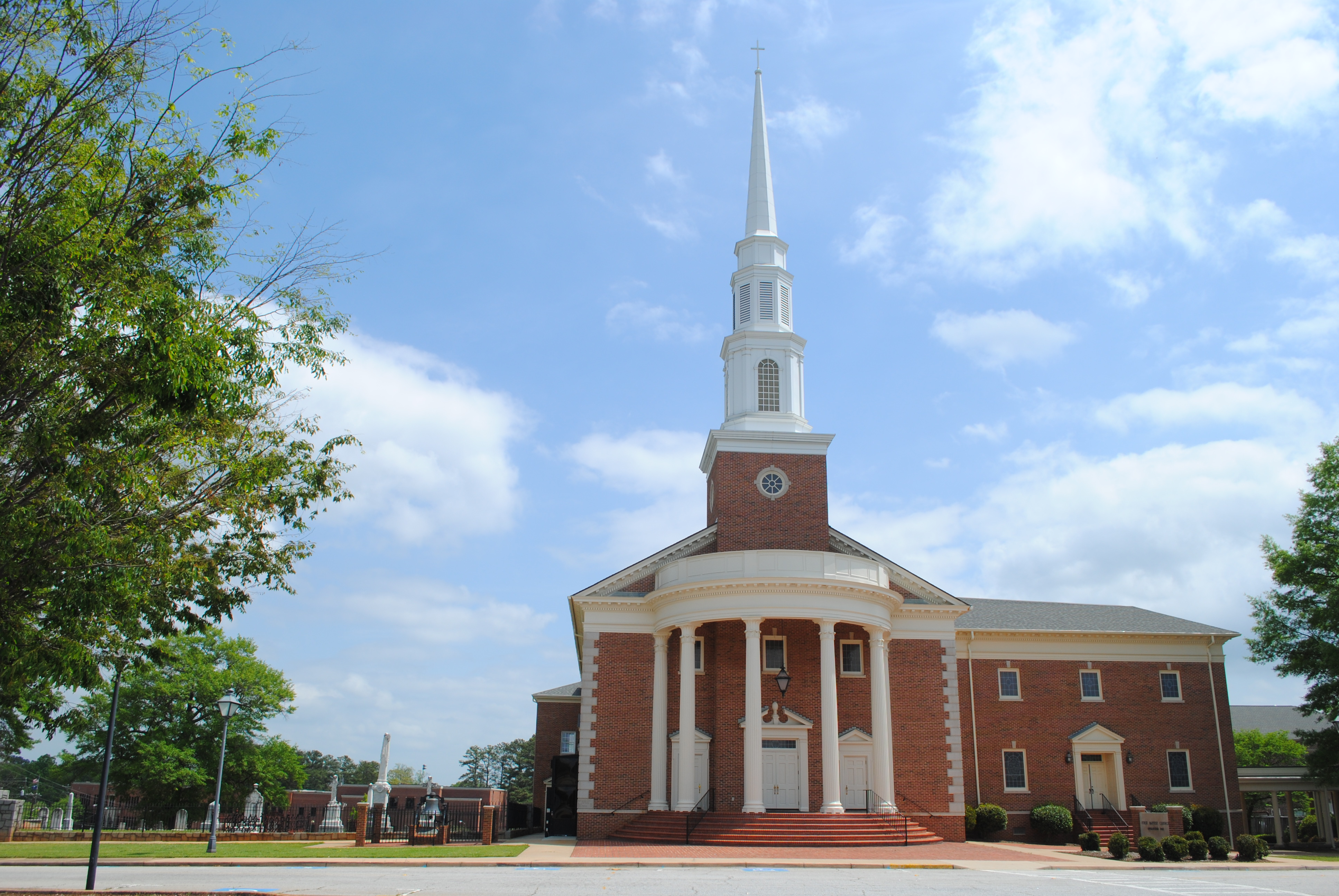
Johnson Female Seminary was established in 1848 at the present-day site of First Baptist Church of Anderson which is also an affiliate of Anderson University

=== Origins (1848–1862) ===
Anderson University was founded in 1848 as Johnson Female Seminary. Its founders were Daniel Brown, J.P. Reed, and Stephen McCulley. Johnson Female Seminary was named for William Bullein Johnson, an early Baptist statesman, a founder and first Vice President of the South Carolina Baptist Convention, and the first president of the Southern Baptist Convention. The seminary was later renamed Johnson University. William Bullein Johnson served as the first chancellor of Johnson University. By 1857 Johnson University had around 600 students taking courses in calculus, Latin, and Greek. Johnson died in 1862.

The university closed its doors due to the combined impact of Johnson's death and the onset of the Civil War. The main building of Johnson University became a Confederate treasury and printing press during the civil war until 1865 when Union forces occupied the building. After the war the Carolina Collegiate Institute and Patrick Military Institute used the buildings of the seminary for educational purposes until 1920. The buildings of Johnson University were then demolished around 1920.

=== Anderson College (1911–2006) ===
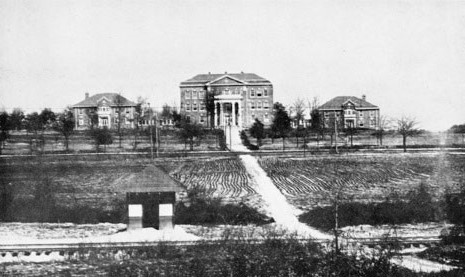
Anderson College in 1911

Johnson University was resurrected in the form of Anderson College in 1911. The name Anderson comes from Robert Anderson, an American Revolutionary War veteran and the namesake of Anderson, South Carolina. The Anderson Chamber of Commerce raised $100,000 and secured 32 acres (13 ha) for the new campus. The land and funds were given to the South Carolina Baptist State Convention to establish the college. The Merritt Administration Building was the first building constructed on the land. For a time this was the only building dedicated to academics. It would eventually house only the president's office and the Merritt Theatre.

At the outset there were financial problems until Annie Denmark became president in 1928. Denmark's inauguration as president on February 14, 1929, established the tradition for Anderson College as Founder's Day celebrating the day of chartering the institution.

In 1931 Anderson College became a coeducational junior college. In the 1990s Anderson returned to its status and offerings as a four-year institution.

=== Anderson University (2006–present) ===
Anderson College was renamed Anderson University in 2006. On the occasion of the first commencement as Anderson University, S. Truett Cathy, founder of Chick-fil-A, and his son Dan Cathy received honorary degrees from Anderson University for "exemplifying the character and vision Christian businessmen should possess". In June 2011 Anderson University became the host of the Palmetto Boys State. The following year, the university joined the University Center of Greenville (UCG).

In June 2022, Anderson University did not renew the contract of part-time theatre professor Miranda Barnett. Barnett claimed her contract was not renewed "because she is queer." A spokesperson from Anderson refused to comment specifically but was quoted as saying "Anderson University is a private Christian university which upholds the South Carolina Baptist traditional view of sexuality and marriage as set forth in Scripture." Barnett was previously selected by students and faculty to receive Anderson's "Excellence in Teaching" award for the 2019-20 school year.

== Campus ==
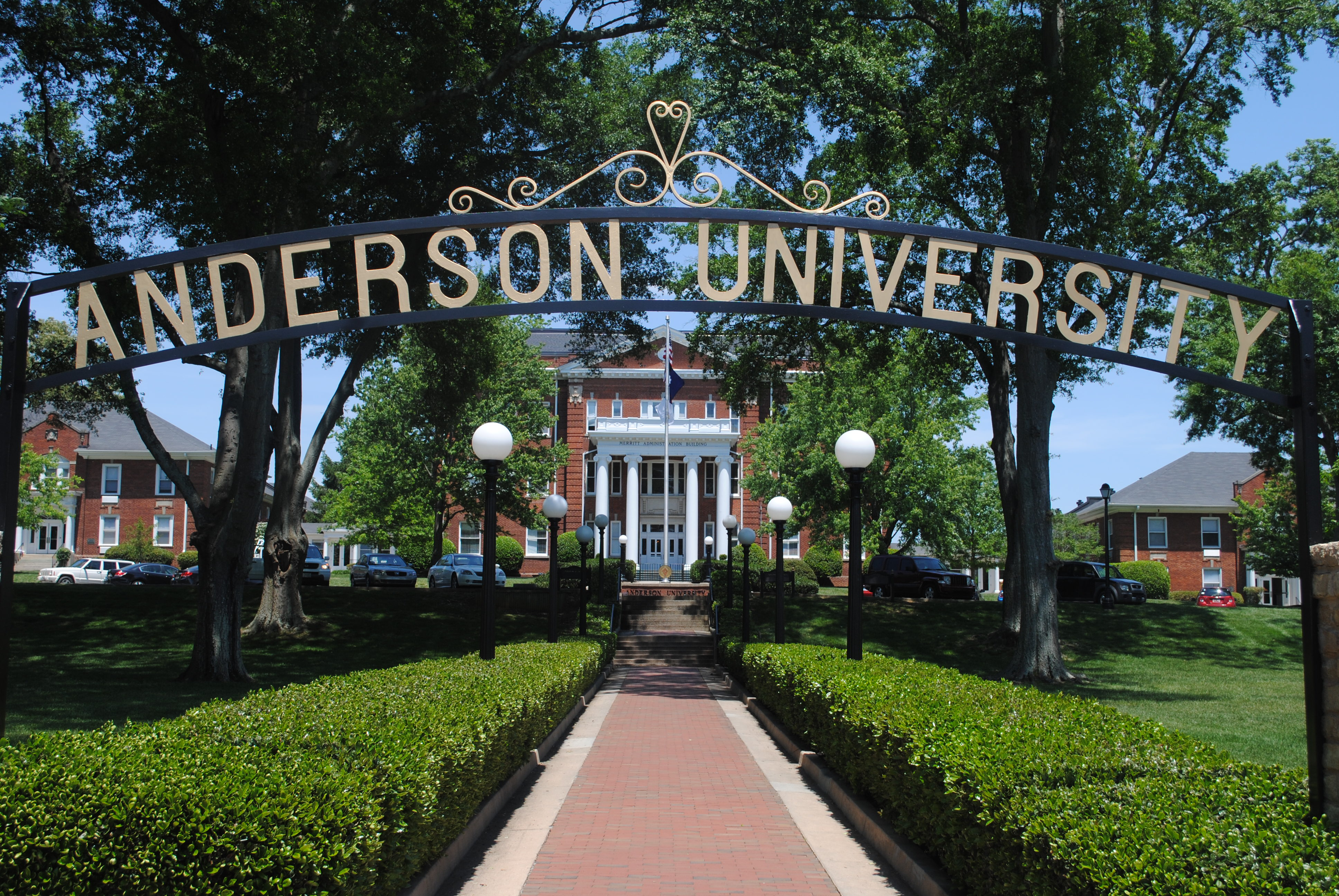
Front view of Anderson University and the Merritt Administration Building

Most of the buildings on the main campus are red brick, built throughout the 20th century in the Georgian architectural style. The Merritt Administration Building, Denmark Hall, and Pratt Hall were the original buildings on the Anderson University campus, being built at the time of the university's founding in 1911. One of the main educational facilities at the heart of campus, Watkins Hall, was dedicated in 1967. Other marked points of interest include the Sullivan Music Building, and the Abney Athletic Center.

The front lawn is called "Alumni Lawn" (sometimes referred to as the "Sacred Six" acres) of Anderson University and is heavily wooded with large oak trees, as is the interior of the main campus which is landscaped in a series of rising terraces. Alumni Lawn and many early buildings are listed on the National Register of Historic Places as the Anderson College Historic District.

In 2008, the university purchased the nearby Anderson County Fairgrounds comprising 77 acres, and simultaneously accepted a gift of 125 adjacent acres on the Rocky River from benefactors John and Marie Pracht. These acquisitions quadrupled the campus acreage from 68 to 270. The Fairgrounds property is being transformed into the university's Athletic Campus. Facilities include a swimming pool, tennis center, softball stadium, soccer stadium, intramural gymnasium, and practice fields with plans for the addition of a baseball stadium, track, fitness center and field house, and athletic administration facility. The Pracht property includes 40 acres of healthy wetlands. Subsequently, the university joined with other wetlands property owners to form the Rocky River Conservancy. The combined properties are being developed into a protected ecological park with trails, boardwalks, and discovery center. The university has reserved a portion of the Pracht property uplands for future development.

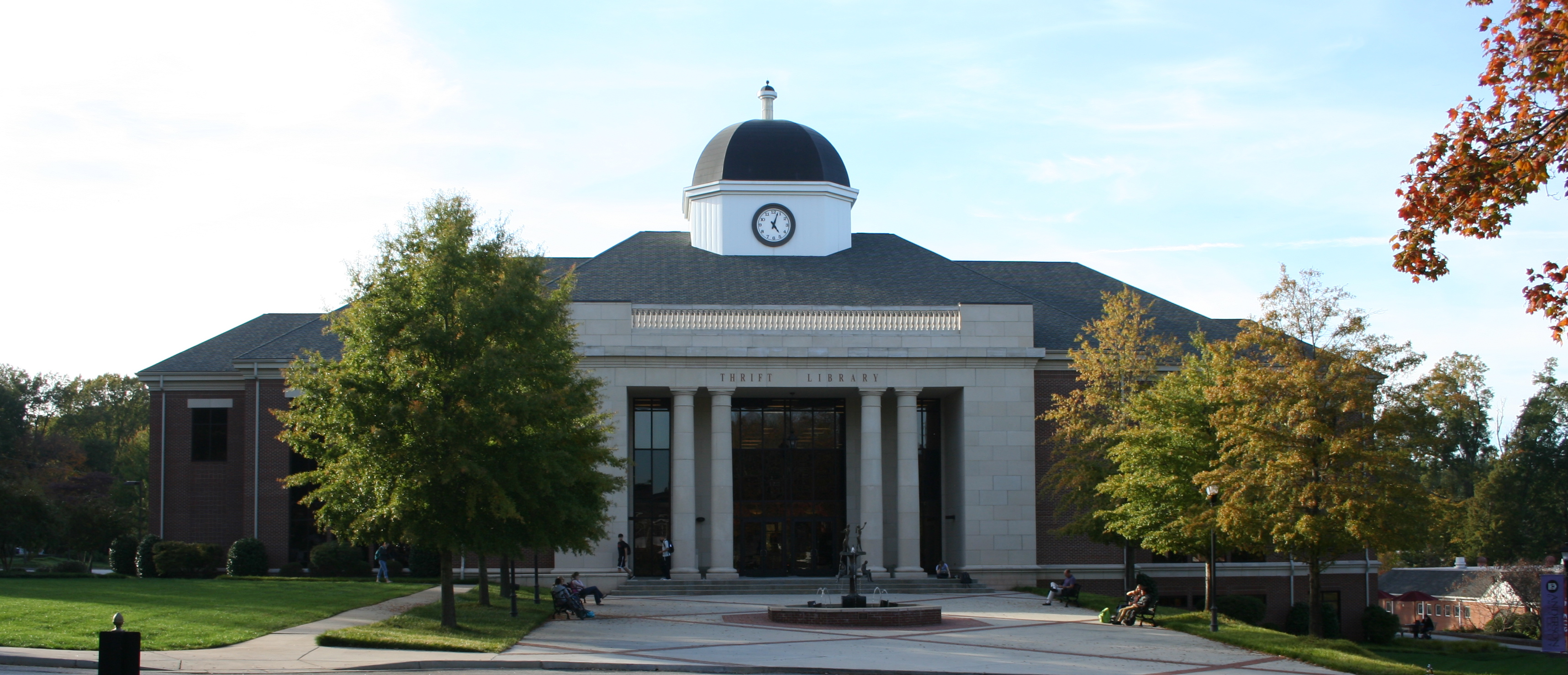
Thrift Library

Anderson University created a special partnership in 2012 which operates within the former Duke Energy Service Center which is approximately one mile from the main campus and which was a partial gift to the university from the former Duke Energy Carolinas (now Duke Energy Progress). The facility is the home of the university's graduate program in criminal justice otherwise known as the Command College of South Carolina. The facility also houses undergraduate criminal justice programs.

In 2013, the university acquired the first floor of the historic Chiquola building in downtown Anderson, less than a mile from the main campus. The 11,000 square foot facility is a multi-purpose space for the university's graphic design degree program, student activities, and a center for the study and practice of entrepreneurship. The facility features three storefront retail spaces in which student-initiated and run businesses will operate.

The Anderson University year-round student population stands at approximately 4,121 students, with a student to faculty ratio of 17:1. Of those, about 3,200 students are traditional undergrads, while the remainder are graduate students.

== Academics ==
Academic rankings

Master's
- Washington Monthly: 562 of 589

Regional
- U.S. News & World Report: 41 (tie) of 123

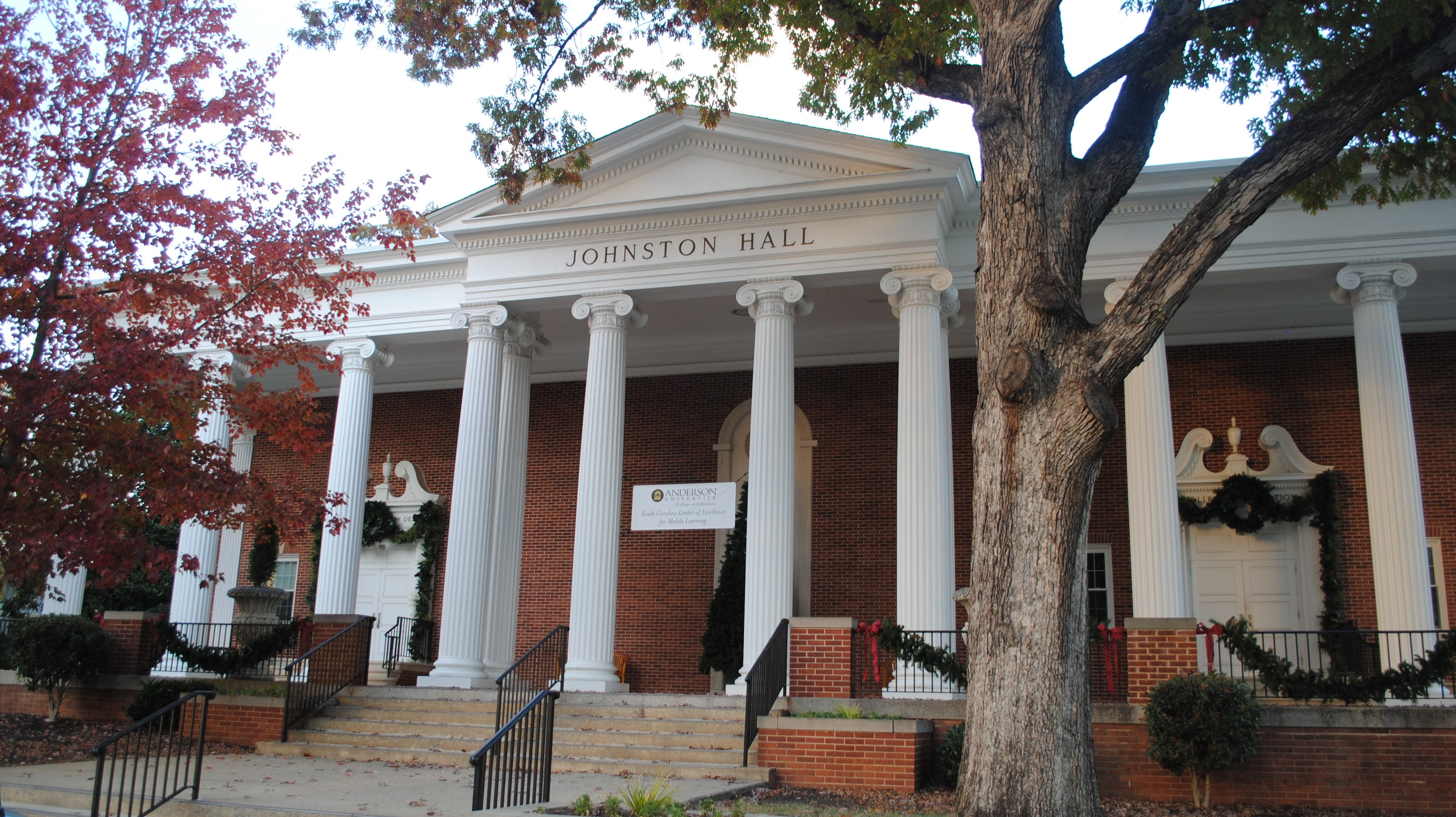
Johnston Hall

=== College of Arts and Sciences ===
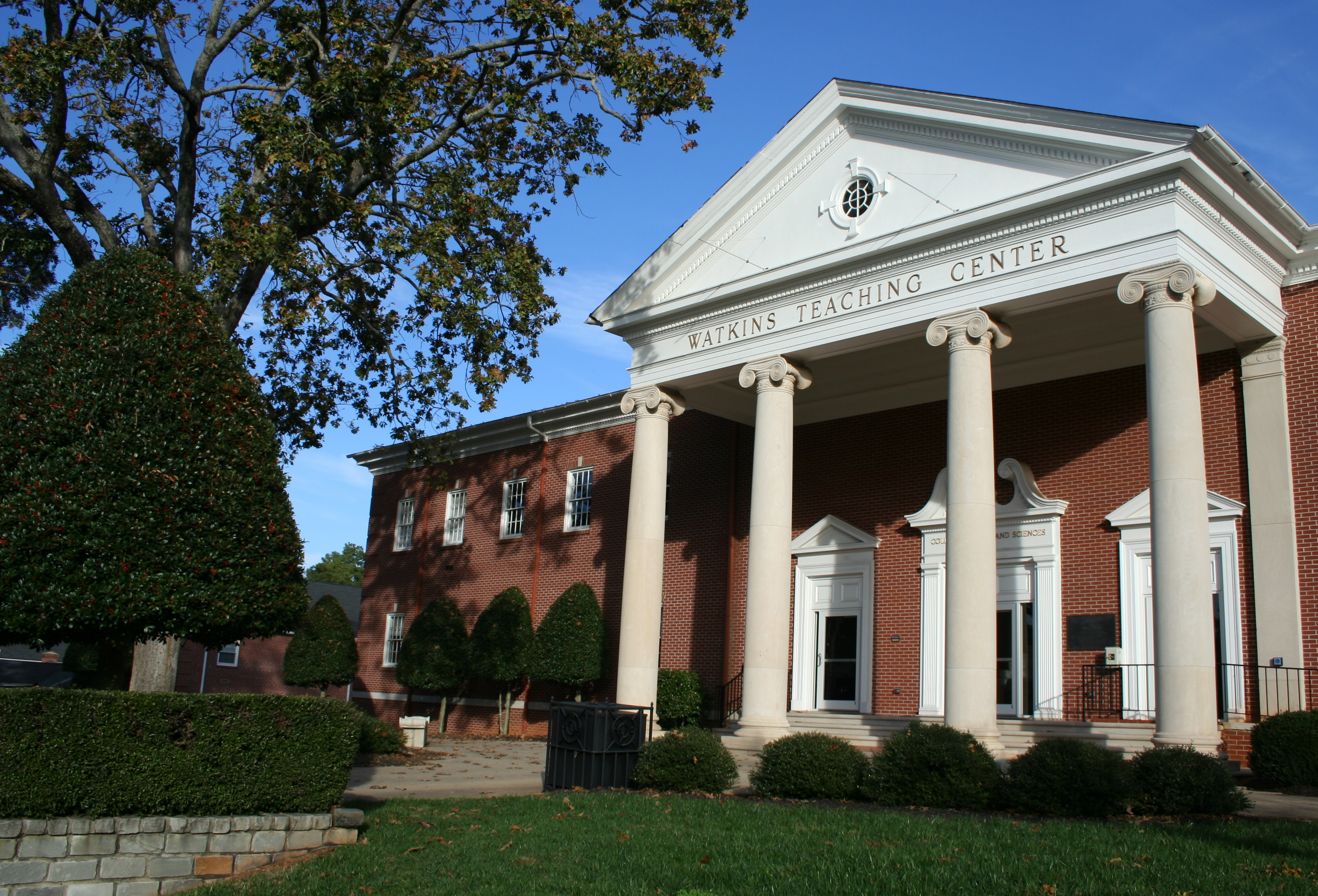
Watkins Teaching Center

Undergraduate programs under the College of Arts and Science consist of biochemistry, biology, communication, creative writing, English literature, writing and digital studies, history, liberal studies, mathematics, political science, psychology, and Spanish. The Center for Undergraduate Cancer Research is also part of the college and was established in 2009 to facilitate undergraduate research in search of a cure for cancers. The center is located on the nearby campus of AnMed Health Medical Center.

=== College of Business and Economics ===
The College of Business and Economics offers both undergraduate and graduate programs. Undergraduate programs consist of business administration, accounting, human resource administration, and marketing.

=== College of Christian Studies ===
The College of Christian Studies comprises undergraduate degree programs and graduate programs through its Clamp Divinity School.

The Clamp Divinity School was launched in 2009 and offers graduate degree programs: Master of Divinity (M.Div.), Master of Ministry (M.Min.), Master of Ministry Management (M.M.M.), Master of Arts in Biblical and Theological Studies (M.A.B.T.S.), Doctor of Ministry, and the Doctor of Philosophy in Leadership (ministry track). The purpose of the Clamp school is to offer training in ministry in preparation for leading churches. The school is named after David T. Clamp who contributed an $8 million naming gift in 2008.

=== College of Education ===
The College of Education prepares students to become public educators. Undergraduate programs consist of early childhood education, elementary education and secondary education. Upon completion of the undergraduate program the teacher licensure can be initiated through South Carolina Department of Education. The graduate program in education prepares teachers to become principals or certified teachers.

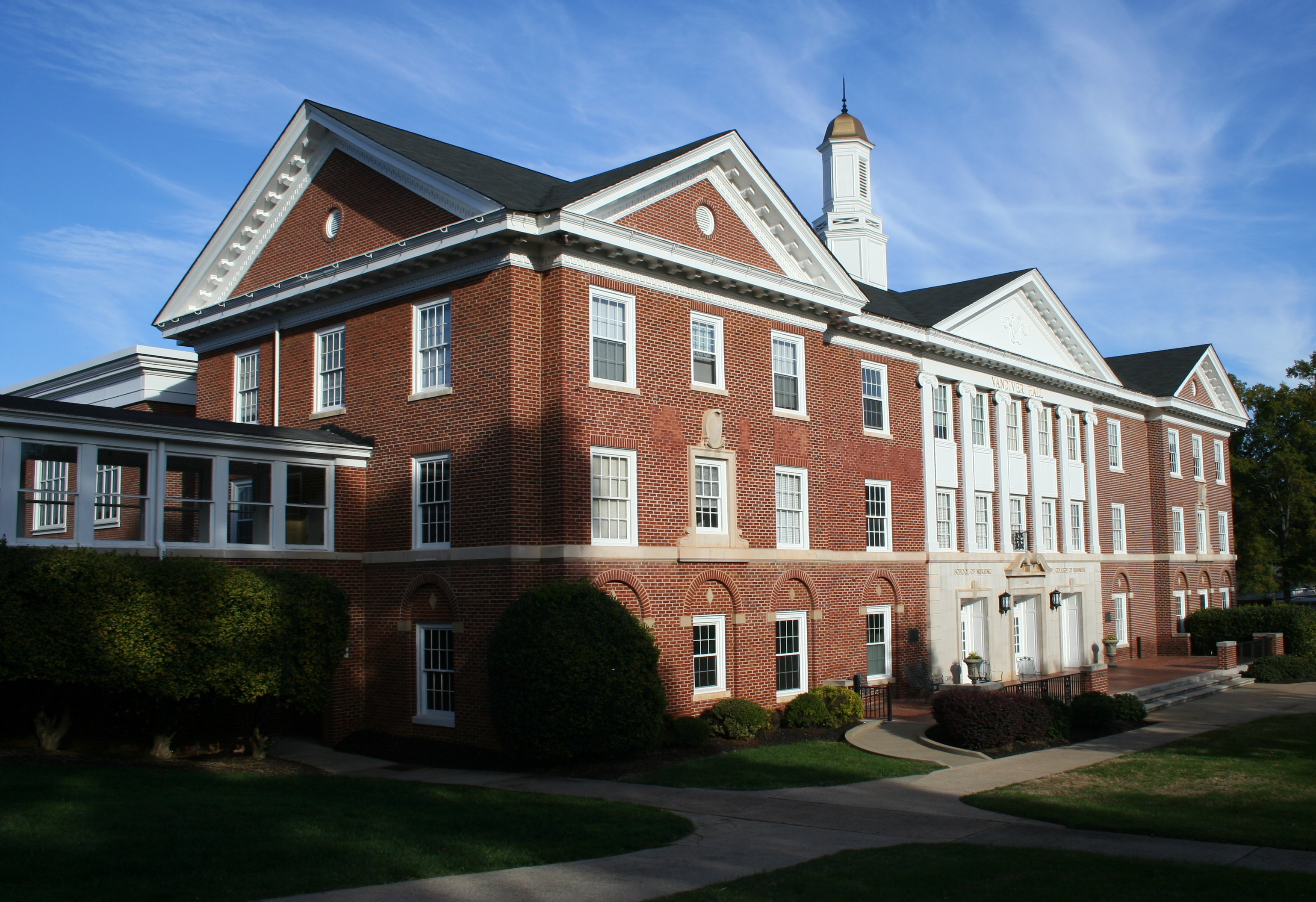
Vandiver Hall

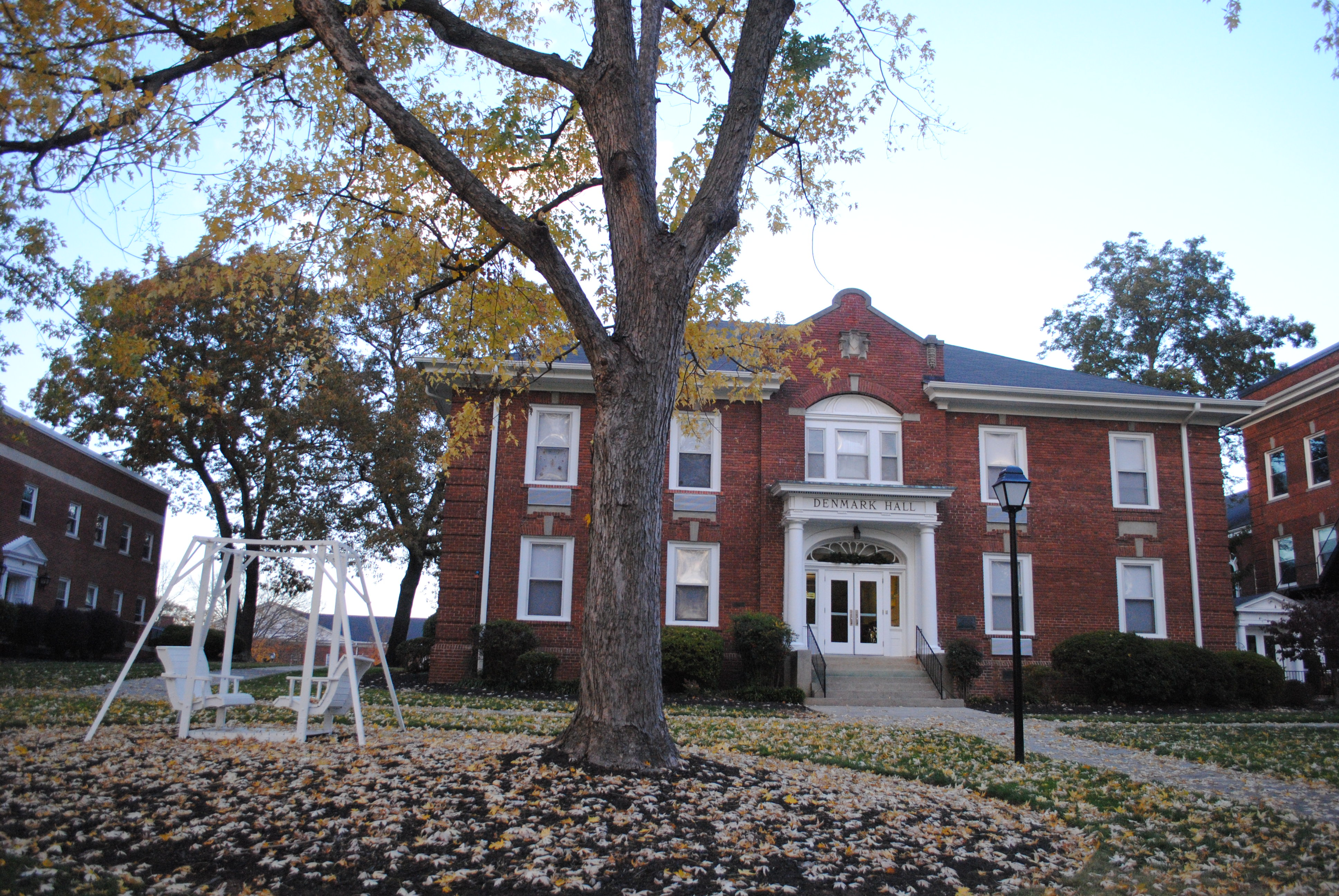
Denmark Hall

=== College of Engineering ===
The College of Engineering was established in 2021 and awards degrees in general, electrical, mechanical, and computer engineering.

=== College of Health Professions ===
The School of Nursing, School of Physical Therapy, School of Allied Health, and the School of Human Performance comprise the College of Health Professions. The schools offer undergraduate programs in nursing, kinesiology, and human services. Graduate programs are offered in nursing (MSN and DNP) and physical therapy (DPT).

=== School of Interior Design ===
The School of Interior Design offers a bachelor's degree of Interior Design.

=== School of Public Service and Administration ===
The School of Public Service and Administration educates law enforcement officers, private investigators, federal agents and prospective law students. The school also offers programs in emergency management. Undergraduate programs prepare students for the local, state and federal law enforcement, corrections and emergency response. The graduate program in criminal justice prepares those experienced in law enforcement to advance their careers into management or senior-executive positions with a commitment to Christian values.

=== The South Carolina School of the Arts ===
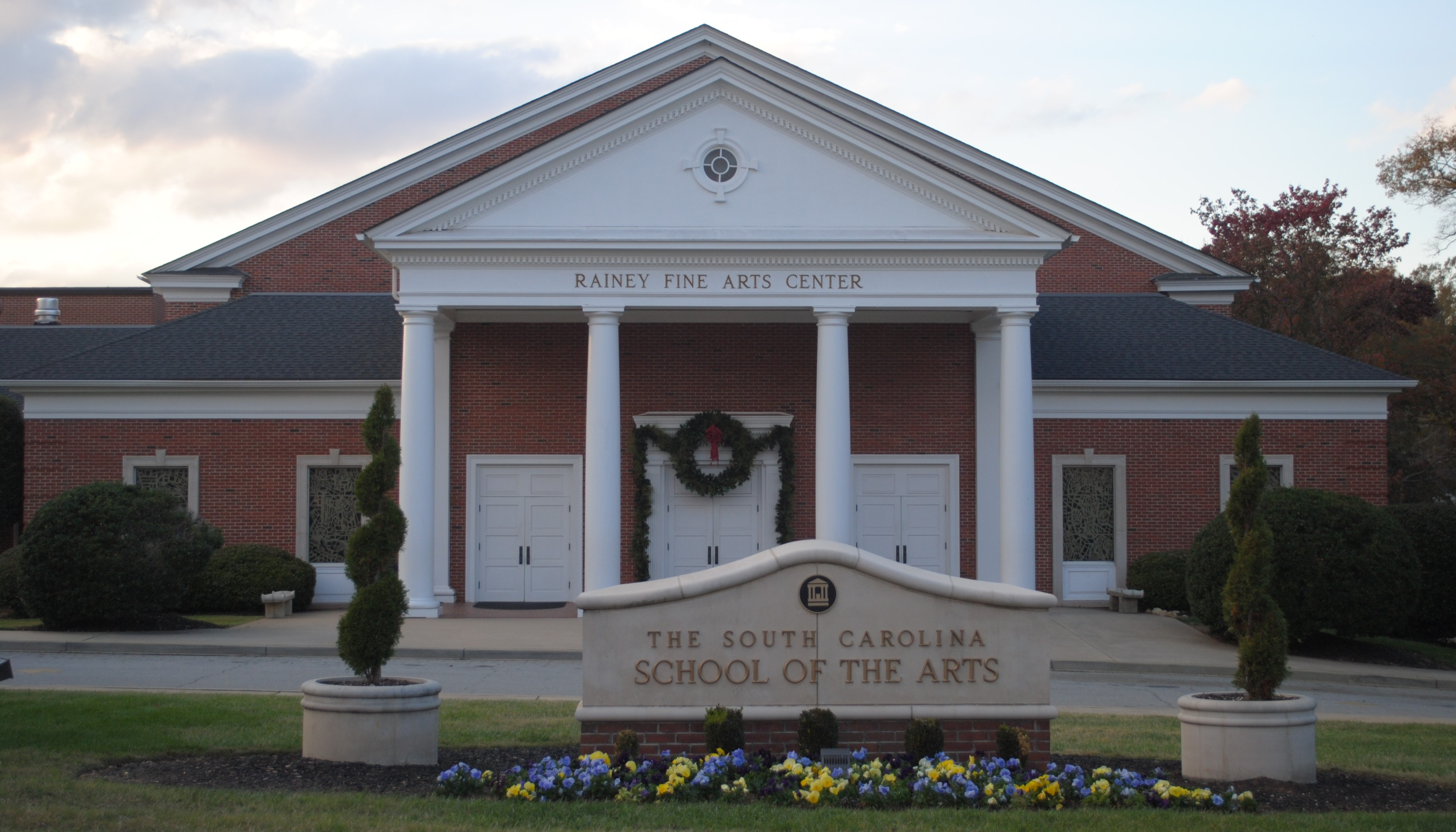
Rainey Fine Arts Center

In 2013, the College of Visual and Performing Arts was re-organized as The South Carolina School of the Arts. Degree programs and emphases within the school include Bachelor of Arts, Bachelor of Fine Arts, Bachelor of Music, Bachelor of Music Education, and Master of Music Education. The school is housed primarily within the Rainey Fine Arts Center which features a 1,000-seat performance hall, a 225-seat recital hall, a 125-seat black box theatre, music and art studios, and an art gallery. The school also has an art gallery within Thrift Library and graphic design facilities off-campus in downtown Anderson.

==== Johnny Mann Center for Commercial Music ====
The Johnny Mann Center is the home of The South Carolina School of the Arts' degree program in commercial music. Commercial music at Anderson University includes pop, rock, jazz, bluegrass, and country music genres. The center also serves as a library for a number of Mann's musical arrangements, compositions, and memorabilia. The Mann Center is named for the two-time Grammy Award-winning American arranger, composer, conductor, entertainer, and recording artist, Johnny Mann.

== Athletics ==
Nicknamed the Trojans, Anderson competes in NCAA Division II athletics as a member of the South Atlantic Conference. Anderson announced the addition of football starting in the 2024 season. Men's sports include baseball, basketball, cross country, football, golf, soccer, tennis, track & field, and lacrosse. Women's sports include basketball, cross country, golf, lacrosse, soccer, softball, tennis, track & field, and volleyball.

== Notable alumni ==
- Thomas C. Alexander, member of the South Carolina Senate, Chairman of the Senate General Committee
- James Lee Barrett, Tony Award-winning writer
- Gwen Bristow, writer and journalist (attended, but did not graduate)
- Trey Britton, professional basketball player
- Timothy M. Cain, District Judge on the United States District Court for the District of South Carolina
- Leigh Cappillino, singer in contemporary Christian music all-female group Point of Grace
- Sue Monk Kidd, New York Times Bestselling author of The Secret Life of Bees, The Mermaid Chair, and The Invention of Wings
- Adam Minarovich, film director and actor
- Rob Stanifer, former Major League Baseball player for the Florida Marlins, Boston Red Sox, and the Hiroshima Toyo Carp
- A.J. Styles, TNA and WWE professional wrestler
- Erskine Thomason, former Major League Baseball player for the Philadelphia Phillies
- James Michael Tyler, actor
