= South Carolina Baptist Convention =

- Abbreviation: SCBaptist
- Classification: Baptist
- Orientation: Southern Baptist
- Region: South Carolina
- Origin: 1821; Columbia, South Carolina
- Members: Dr. Tony Wolfe (Executive Director-Treasurer), Dr. Ryan Pack (President)
- Official website: www.scbaptist.org

The South Carolina Baptist Convention is a group of churches cooperating with the Southern Baptist Convention, located in the U.S. state of South Carolina. It is headquartered in Columbia, South Carolina. The convention is made up of 42 Baptist associations and around 2,000 churches as of 2023.

The Convention was founded December 4, 1821 at First Baptist Church of Columbia with nine total messengers in attendance. Richard Furman was elected as the first president of the Convention and Abner Blocker was elected as Secretary. William B. Johnson and John Landrum were tasked with writing a constitution. On Thursday December 6, 1821, the Constitution was adopted. In 1822, William Bullein Johnson was elected as the first vice-president of the Convention. At this time, there were 213 churches and 122 pastors across seven associations. Furman's pupil, William Bullein Johnson, who served from 1825 to 1852, succeeded him upon his death and became the first president of the Southern Baptist Convention from 1845 to 1851 after the split with the Triennial Convention over the issue of slavery.

As of 2000, there were 1,878 churches cooperating with the Southern Baptist Convention in South Carolina with 928,341 adherents.

== Furman University ==
In 1825, the Convention elected a board to organize an institution to train young men for the ministry. The Furman Academy and Theological Institution was established the following year. It officially opened in January 1827 and was named in honor of Richard Furman, a Baptist minister and education pioneer. Furman University severed its association with the Convention in 1992.

== Cooperating organizations ==
- Baptist Courier - State Newspaper
- Connie Maxwell Children's Ministries
- South Carolina Baptist Foundation
- South Carolina Baptist Ministries for the Aging
- Woman's Missionary Union

== Cooperating universities ==
- Anderson University
- Charleston Southern University
- North Greenville University

== See also ==
- Preston Callison
