= First Baptist Church (Columbia, South Carolina) =

Historic church in South Carolina, United States

- U.S. National Register of Historic Places
- U.S. National Historic Landmark
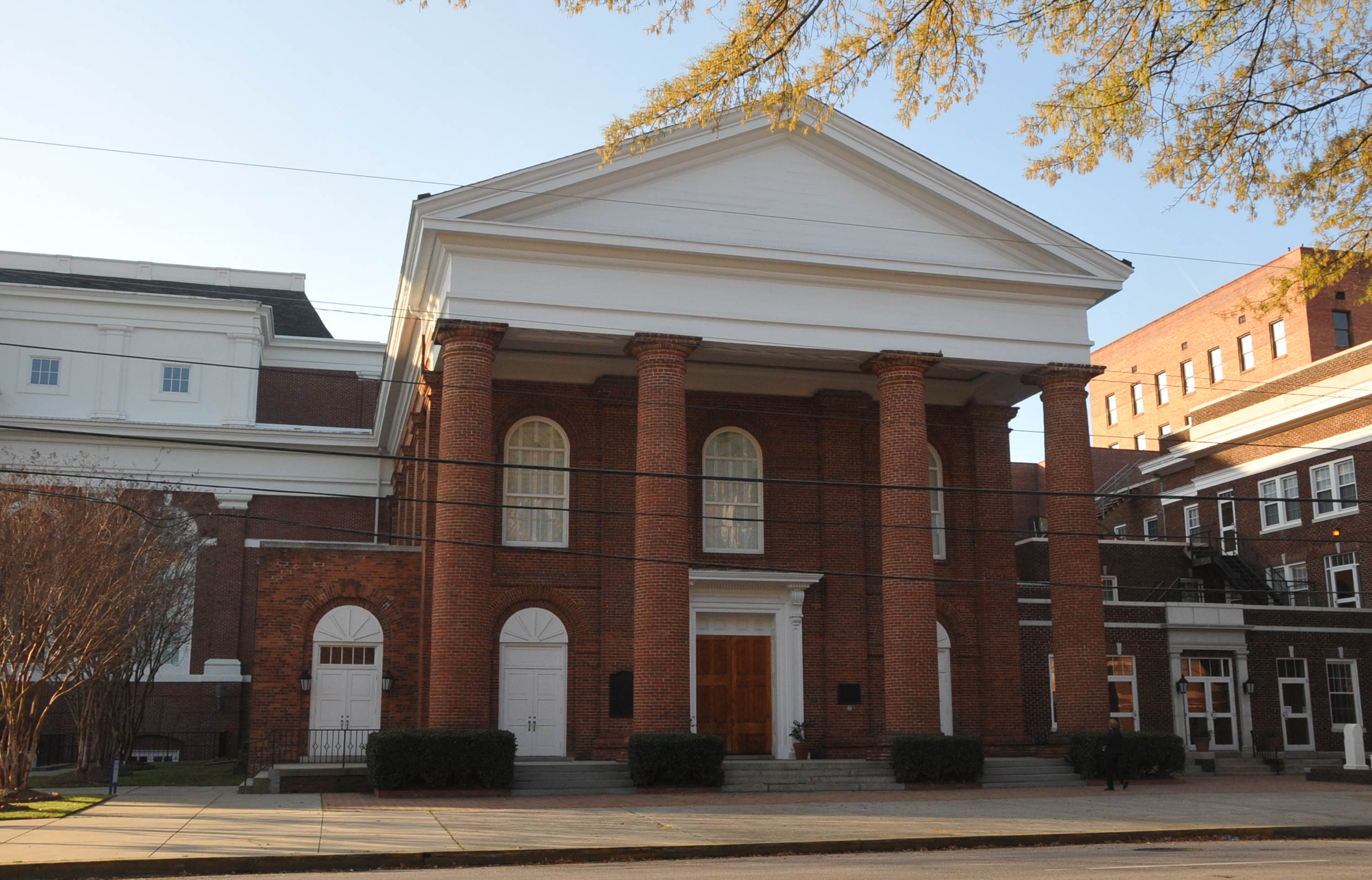
- The Boyce Chapel in 2012

- Location within South Carolina Location within the United States
- Location: 1306 Hampton St., Columbia, South Carolina
- Coordinates: 34°0′19.97″N 81°2′0.03″W
- Built: 1859
- Architectural style: Greek Revival
- NRHP reference No.: 71000800

Significant dates
- Added to NRHP: January 25, 1971
- Designated NHL: November 7, 1973

The James Petigru Boyce Chapel is a historic church building at 1306 Hampton Street in Columbia, South Carolina. It is a Greek Revival building built in 1859. A convention met here on December 17, 1860, whose delegates voted unanimously for South Carolina to secede from the United States, leading to the American Civil War. It was designated a National Historic Landmark as First Baptist Church, the role it played at the time. The building is part of the facilities complex of the First Baptist Church, Columbia- a Southern Baptist megachurch.

== History ==
The First Baptist Church of Columbia was first organized in 1809, with the building of the first church building, located on Sumter Street, in 1811.

The second First Baptist Church was built in 1859 by an unknown architect. Its construction was funded by James P. Boyce, a former president of the Southern Baptist Theological Seminary.

In 1860, the Church was the site of the first state convention to discuss secession following the election of Abraham Lincoln as President of the United States. It was chosen because it was the largest meeting place in Columbia. Under the chairmanship of D. F. Jamison, a unanimous vote of 159-0 in favor of secession on December 17, 1860 led to South Carolina seceding from the United States; it was the only such convention where the vote to secede was unanimous. Six other states would follow South Carolina's lead before the Battle of Fort Sumter; some felt if they did not secede now, they might lose the argument that a state had the right to secede, a right that has never been confirmed or denied by a court of law.

This convention lasted only one day, as Columbia was then experiencing an outbreak of smallpox. South Carolina's Order of Secession would not be signed until the delegates at this convention reconvened at Charleston, South Carolina on December 20; Columbia's little First Baptist Church was where the power brokers of South Carolina first declared that the state would secede.

When the Union Army invaded Columbia, they set fire to the Washington Street Methodist Church, South, building, led by the black First Baptist sexton who thought that it was the site of the secession convention. The invaders burned a third of Columbia's buildings, but the First Baptist Church was spared.

Until 1992, the original building was used for services, which have been televised. The church is still used for other activities such as offices, weddings, and a coffee shop connected to the church. In 1992, services moved to a new building connected to the historic building that includes the new sanctuary and the Estep Family Life Centre. The original building was renamed for Boyce.

== Building description ==
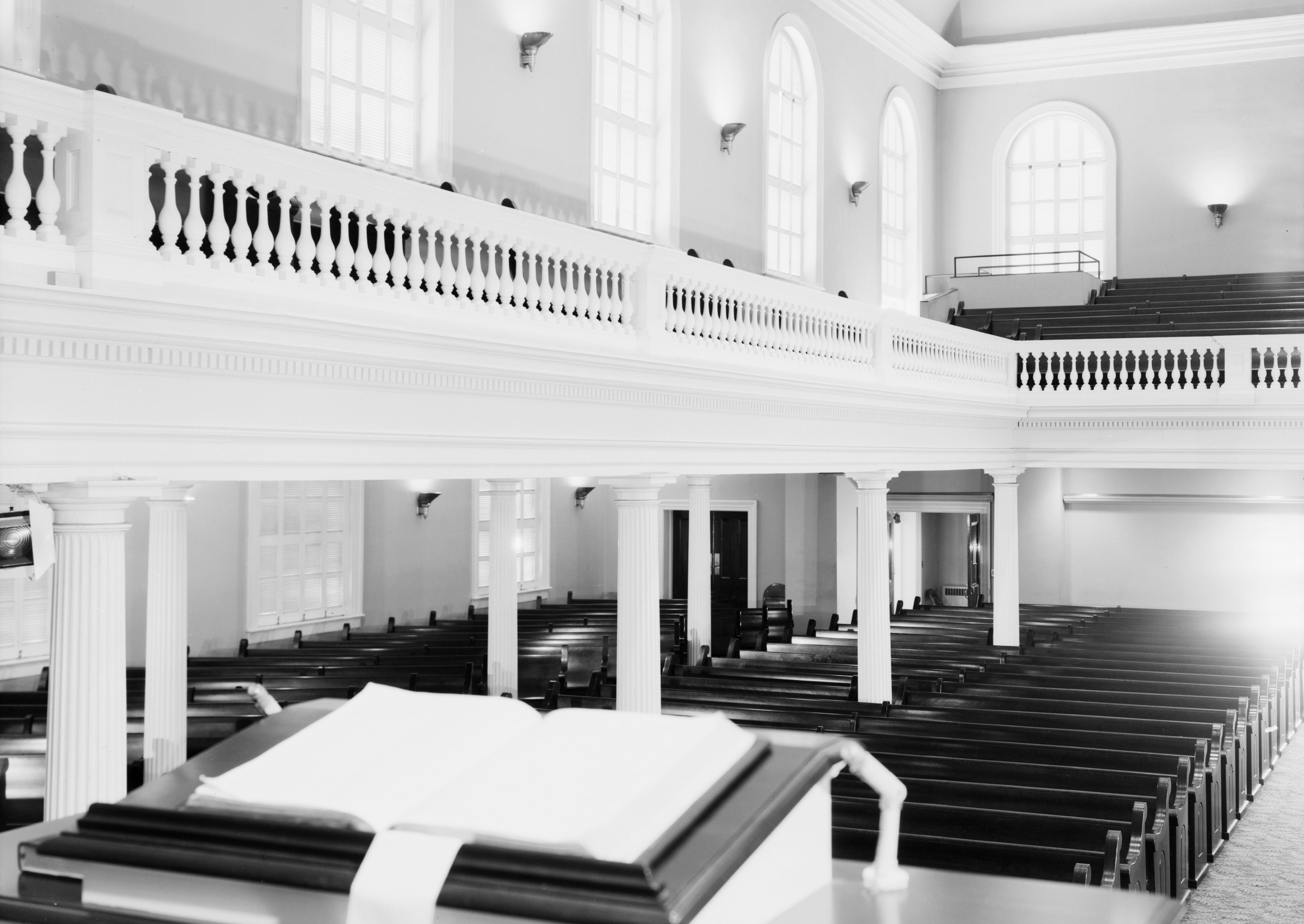
Interior, 1960, HABS

The First Baptist Church is built in Greek Revival style. Originally, the building was 56 feet (17 m) wide and 84 feet (26 m) long. It has molded brick Tuscan portico and Tuscan pilasters along the sides. There is a balcony on each side and above the entrance. Around 1900, the bricks were painted a dirty brown. In 1941, the church was given air conditioning and was extended 35 feet (11 m), with its rear wall moved, giving a place for the choir and a baptistery. In 1949, fifteen foot side aisles were placed, with steel columns made in Doric style to reinforce and match the old architecture. It was also in 1949 that the dirty brown paint of the brick walls was removed, but in the process, the walls were now ranging in color from dark pink to light tan.

The original (1859) church was 84 feet (26 m) deep by 56 feet (17 m) wide.

It was listed on the National Register of Historic Places in 1971, and became a National Historic Landmark in 1973.

== See also ==
- List of National Historic Landmarks in South Carolina
- National Register of Historic Places in Columbia, South Carolina
