= National Register of Historic Places listings in Anderson County, South Carolina =

Location of Anderson County in South Carolina

This is a list of the National Register of Historic Places listings in Anderson County, South Carolina.

This is intended to be a complete list of the properties and districts on the National Register of Historic Places in Anderson County, South Carolina, United States. The locations of National Register properties and districts for which the latitude and longitude coordinates are included below, may be seen in a map.

There are 26 properties and districts listed on the National Register in the county. Another 2 properties were once listed but have been removed.

This National Park Service list is complete through NPS recent listings posted October 23, 2026.

== Current listings ==
	Name on the Register	Image	Date listed	Location	City or town	Description
1	Anderson College Historic District	Anderson College Historic District	May 20, 1998 (#98000556)	316 Boulevard Ave. 34°30′49″N 82°38′18″W	Anderson	
2	Anderson Downtown Historic District	Anderson Downtown Historic District	February 23, 1979 (#79002372)	Main St. between Tribble and Market Sts.; also 402 N. Main St.; also 400-420 S Main & 109 W Market Sts. 34°29′50″N 82°38′59″W	Anderson	Additional addresses represent boundary increases approved November 5, 2007 and May 24, 2018
3	Anderson Historic District	Anderson Historic District	December 13, 1971 (#71000739)	Bounded by Hampton, Main, Franklin, McDuffie, Benson, and Fant Sts. 34°30′00″N 82°38′52″W	Anderson	
4	Ashtabula	Ashtabula	March 23, 1972 (#72001186)	1.25 miles northeast of Pendleton off South Carolina Highway 88; 34°40′44″N 82°45′25″W	Pendleton vicinity	
5	Belton Depot	Belton Depot	August 13, 1979 (#79002373)	Public Square; 34°31′21″N 82°29′41″W	Belton	
6	Belton Standpipe	Belton Standpipe	November 5, 1987 (#87001948)	McGee St. 34°31′21″N 82°29′30″W	Belton	
7	Boone-Douthit House	Boone-Douthit House	July 3, 1997 (#97000742)	1000 Milwee Creek Rd. 34°36′21″N 82°43′50″W	Pendleton vicinity	
8	Caldwell-Johnson-Morris Cottage	Caldwell-Johnson-Morris Cottage	October 7, 1971 (#71000740)	220 E. Morris St. 34°29′55″N 82°38′50″W	Anderson	
9	Chamberlain-Kay House	Chamberlain-Kay House	November 25, 1980 (#80003652)	205 River St. 34°31′26″N 82°29′29″W	Belton	
10	Denver Downs Farmstead	Denver Downs Farmstead	March 7, 2007 (#07000118)	4915 Clemson Boulevard; 34°34′48″N 82°43′28″W	Anderson vicinity	
11	Faith Cabin Library at Anderson County Training School	Faith Cabin Library at Anderson County Training School	November 14, 2012 (#12000941)	145 Town St. 34°39′08″N 82°47′16″W	Pendleton	Part of the Faith Cabin Libraries in South Carolina 1932-ca.1960 MPS
12	Robert J. and Lula Ginn House	Robert J. and Lula Ginn House	September 23, 2019 (#100004408)	106 Webb St. 34°30′07″N 82°39′37″W	Anderson	
13	Kennedy Street School	Kennedy Street School	October 24, 2007 (#07001111)	816 Kennedy St. 34°29′54″N 82°38′34″W	Anderson	
14	North Anderson Historic District	North Anderson Historic District	July 31, 2008 (#08000733)	E. and W. North Ave. between Boundary St. and Mauldin Dr., including parts of Edgewood Dr., Blair St., and Central Ave. 34°31′16″N 82°39′30″W	Anderson	
15	Dr. Samuel Marshall Orr House	Dr. Samuel Marshall Orr House	April 13, 1973 (#73001673)	809 W. Market St. 34°30′00″N 82°39′39″W	Anderson	
16	Pelzer Community Building		September 24, 2025 (#100012300)	30 Pelzer Park Street; 34°38′44″N 82°27′48″W	Pelzer	
17	Pelzer Manufacturing Company and Mill Village Historic District	Pelzer Manufacturing Company and Mill Village Historic District	October 10, 2017 (#100001718)	Portions of Lebby, Reed, Courtney, Smythe, & Anderson Sts. 34°38′30″N 82°27′25″W	Pelzer	
18	Pelzer Presbyterian Church	Pelzer Presbyterian Church	December 13, 1993 (#93001407)	13 Lebby St. 34°38′32″N 82°27′34″W	Pelzer	
19	Pendleton Cotton Mill	Pendleton Cotton Mill	January 29, 2018 (#100002060)	250 S. Depot St. 34°38′48″N 82°46′42″W	Pendleton	Now the Pendleton Mill Lofts
20	Pendleton Historic District	Pendleton Historic District	August 25, 1970 (#70000560)	Bounded on the west by Hopewell and Treaty Oak, on the north by Old Stone Church, on the east by Montpelier, and on the south by the town limits 34°39′40″N 82°47′42″W	Pendleton	Extends into Oconee and Pickens counties
21	Ralph John Ramer House	Ralph John Ramer House	February 10, 1992 (#92000023)	402 Boulevard; 34°30′49″N 82°38′27″W	Anderson	
22	St. Paul Baptist Church		May 22, 2026 (#100013030)	322 W. Reed Street; 34°29′56″N 82°39′15″W	Anderson	
23	Obediah Shirley House	Obediah Shirley House	September 3, 1999 (#99000201)	Bagwell Rd. 34°27′07″N 82°24′50″W	Honea Path vicinity	
24	United States Post Office and Court House	United States Post Office and Court House	October 13, 2017 (#100001746)	315 S. McDuffie St. 34°30′07″N 82°38′54″W	Anderson	Now called the G. Ross Anderson, Jr. Federal Building and U.S. Courthouse.
25	Woodburn	Woodburn	May 6, 1971 (#71000741)	130 History Ln. 34°38′26″N 82°47′47″W	Pendleton	
26	Woodson Farmstead		April 30, 1998 (#98000422)	3 Powdersville Rd. 34°47′20″N 82°29′08″W	Powdersville	Farmstead was demolished in 2011.

== Former listings ==
	Name on the Register	Image	Date listed	Date removed	Location	City or town	Description
1	McFall House		June 28, 1982 (#82003829)	December 8, 2005	SR 247; 34°26′40″N 82°35′40″W	Anderson vicinity	No longer exists.
2	Nick Prevost House	Nick Prevost House	July 10, 1984 (#84002020)	December 8, 2005	105 N. Prevost Street; 34°30′05″N 82°40′32″W	Anderson vicinity	No longer exists.

== See also ==
- List of National Historic Landmarks in South Carolina
- National Register of Historic Places listings in South Carolina
