= Anderson Historic District =

Anderson Historic District, Anderson Downtown Historic District, or variations, may refer to:

- Anderson Place Historic District, Birmingham, Alabama, listed on the National Register of Historic Places
- Anderson Downtown Historic District (Anderson, Indiana)
- Larz Anderson Park Historic District, Boston, Massachusetts
- Anderson College Historic District, Anderson, South Carolina
- Anderson Downtown Historic District (Anderson, South Carolina)
- Anderson Historic District (Anderson, South Carolina)
- North Anderson Historic District, Anderson, South Carolina
- Anderson Historic District (Anderson, Texas)
- Anderson Hollow Archaeological District, Lexington, Virginia
- Anderson Dock Historic District, Ephraim, Wisconsin, listed on the National Register of Historic Places
