= Downs House =

Downs House may refer to:

- N. C. Downs House, Kenton, Delaware, listed on the NRHP in Kent County, Delaware
- Thomas Downs House, Charlestown, Indiana, listed on the NRHP in Clark County, Indiana
- Denver Downs Farmstead, Anderson, South Carolina, listed on the NRHP in Anderson County, South Carolina
- Charles Downs II House, Marlowe, West Virginia, listed on the NRHP in Berkeley County, West Virginia

== See also ==
- Downe House and Down House (disambiguation)
