= Belton Standpipe =

Belton Standpipe may refer to:

- Belton Standpipe (Belton, South Carolina), listed on the National Register of Historic Places in Anderson County, South Carolina
- Belton Standpipe (Belton, Texas), listed on the National Register of Historic Places in Bell County, Texas
