= Chamblee (surname) =

Chamblee is a surname. Notable people with the surname include:

- Andrew Chamblee (born 2004), American football player
- Brandel Chamblee (born 1962), American golfer, commentator and writer
- Eddie Chamblee (1920–1999), American tenor and alto saxophonist, and vocalist
- Jim Chamblee (born 1975), American baseball player
- Jones M. Chamblee (born 1936), American politician
