= Chiquola =

Chiquola may refer to:

- A previous name for Pawleys Island, South Carolina used by local Native Americans
- Hotel Chiquola, part of the Anderson Downtown Historic District, Anderson, South Carolina
- Chiquola textile mill, operated in Honea Path, South Carolina from 1903 to 2003
