= Elizabeth Craig =

Elizabeth Craig may refer to:

- Elizabeth Craig (writer) (1883–1980), Scottish journalist, home economist and cookery writer
- Elizabeth Craig (rower) (born 1957), Canadian rower
- Liz Craig (Elizabeth Dorothy Craig, born 1967/68), New Zealand politician and physician
- Elizabeth A. Craig (born 1946), biochemist
- Lil Tudor-Craig (Elizabeth Tudor-Craig, born 1960), British conservationist, environmental artist, and literary illustrator
- Elizabeth Spann Craig, American novelist
