= Milford Burriss =

American businessman and politician (1937–2016)

Member of the South Carolina House of Representatives from the 80th district
- In office 1985–1990

Personal details
- Born: Milford Deal Burriss; February 23, 1937 Anderson, South Carolina, U.S.
- Died: July 21, 2016 (aged 79) Eastover, South Carolina, U.S.
- Party: Republican

Milford Deal Burriss (February 23, 1937 – July 21, 2016) was an American businessman and politician.

== Biography ==
He served in the South Carolina House of Representatives as a member of the Republican Party from 1985 to 1990, representing Richland County, South Carolina. He was a former electrical contractor. Burris graduated from Brookland Cayce High School and then served in the United States Navy. In 1961, he graduated from the University of South Carolina, in 1961, and worked as an electrical contractor. Burriss died of acute myeloid leukemia in 2016 in Eastover where he lived.
