= Lily Strickland =

American composer, painter and writer

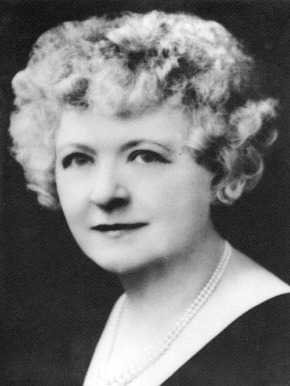
- Born: January 28, 1884; Anderson, South Carolina
- Died: June 6, 1958 (aged 74); Hendersonville, North Carolina
- Known for: Music Composition, Watercolorist
- Spouse: Joseph Courtenay Anderson (m. 1912–1958)

Lily Strickland (January 28, 1884 – June 6, 1958) was an American composer, painter and writer.

== Biography ==
Lily Strickland was born on January 28, 1884, in Anderson, South Carolina. Her father was Charlton Hines Strickland and her mother was Teresa Hammond Reed. She had two brothers and was the only daughter. When her father died, the family moved into the home of her grandparents, Judge and Mr. J. Pinckney Reed. Strickland began studying piano at age six and was encouraged by her parents to continue composing throughout her life. She studied piano and composition at Converse College and in 1905 received a scholarship to study at the Institute of Musical Arts (later Juilliard) in New York City.

In 1912, she married Joseph Courtenay Anderson, an English teacher at Columbia University. She followed Joseph around and compose, write, and paint wherever he went. They never had children due to both of their dreams of traveling and exploring the world. When Anderson became manager for an American company in 1920, the couple moved to Calcutta, and spent the next ten years in India. Strickland traveled in Africa and Asia, painted and published articles in American magazines. She received an honorary doctorate in music from Converse College in 1924 in recognition of her success as a composer.

Lily Strickland loved to push back on the southern standard of women at the time by doing adventurous things such as hitch hiking in India which would have been fronded upon at the time. She also used her artistic talents to show that women can be smart and thoughtful. She composed works that were used in the silent cinema, art song, and solo piano works. As an early ethnomusicologist, she chronicled her experiences with several musical cultures as a special correspondent for The Music Courier. Her articles include those on Ceylon (The Musical Courier, vol 86, no. 9); music at Hindu Temples (vol. 86 no. 13); "Natuch" dancing (vol. 87, no. 15); snake charmers and music (vol. 87, no. 19); "devil dancing" (vol. 87, no. 20); Tibetan Buddhist music (vol. 87, no. 21); and music related to Krishna (vol. 87, no. 22). She also published several similar articles in The Etude, and was featured by the magazines in several articles about her own compositions.

The Andersons returned to New York, and in 1948 retired to a farm near Hendersonville, North Carolina where she still wrote and composed will the end of her life. Strickland died of a stroke on June 6, 1958.

== Works ==
Strickland published 395 works, including popular and sacred music and children's songs. Her early compositions were influenced by spirituals and folk songs from the American South, and later works by Asian and African music. Selected works include:

- Mah Lindy Lou
- Ballade of la belle dame sans merci (Text: John Keats)
- Love wakes and weeps (Text: Sir Walter Scott)
- My lover is a fisherman (from Songs of India)

Strickland's music has been recorded and issued on CDs, including AMERICAN INDIANISTS, Vol. 2, Marco Polo (1996).

Strickland was also a prolific painter of watercolor, most of which was done during her time abroad. The largest collection of her paintings can be found at the Anderson University Art Museum, in Anderson, South Carolina.
