= McFall House =

Historic house in South Carolina, United States

- Formerly listed on the U.S. National Register of Historic Places
- Nearest city: Anderson, South Carolina
- Area: 6 acres (2.4 ha)
- Built: 1825
- Architectural style: Central Hall, Double-pile
- NRHP reference No.: 82003829

Significant dates
- Added to NRHP: June 1982
- Removed from NRHP: December 8, 2005

The McFall House was a residence near Anderson, South Carolina. Andrew McFall, a local farmer, constructed the house in 1825. The house was listed on the National Register of Historic Places in June 1982 and removed from the register on December 8, 2005. The McFall House was Anderson's oldest brick house.
