= Downe House =

Downe House or Down House may refer to:

- Downe House School, a girls' boarding school in Berkshire, England
- Down House, Charles Darwin's home in the village of Downe in the London Borough of Bromley
- Downe House, Richmond Hill, previously home of Mick Jagger and Jerry Hall
- Down House (film), a 2001 Russian comedy film

== See also ==
- Downs House (disambiguation)
