= Nick Prevost House =

Historic house in South Carolina, United States

- Formerly listed on the U.S. National Register of Historic Places
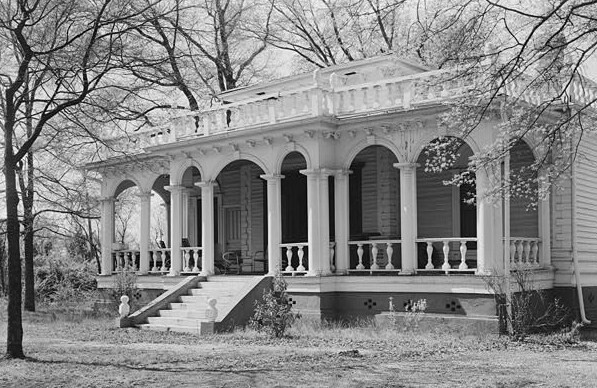
- Nick Prevost House in 1960

- Location within South Carolina Location within the United States
- Location: 105 N. Prevost St., Anderson, South Carolina
- Area: 0.2 acres (0.081 ha)
- Built: 1920
- Architectural style: Renaissance
- NRHP reference No.: 84002020

Significant dates
- Added to NRHP: July 10, 1984
- Removed from NRHP: 2005

The Nick Prevost House was a residence near Anderson, South Carolina. Built in 1877 by Nick Prevost, a local entrepreneur, it was listed on the National Register of Historic Places in 1984, but was taken off the list in 2005 after it was demolished. The house is described as an early example of Neoclassical Revival architecture. The design was based on a house exhibited at the 1876 Centennial Exposition in Philadelphia. The one-story three bay wood-frame house had simulated wood quoins at the corners and an arcaded porch across the front. The porch featured segmental arches on Doric columns. The roof was flat, with a balustrade matching that on the porch.
