= Belton, South Carolina =

Belton
- City
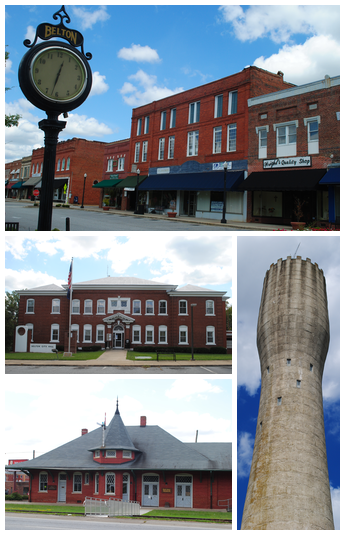
- Top, left to right: Downtown Belton, Belton City Hall, Belton Depot, Belton Standpipe
- Motto: "The Standpipe City"
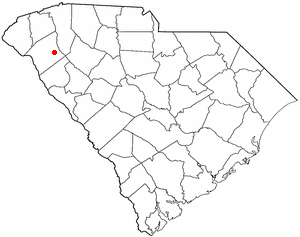
- Location in Anderson County, South Carolina

- Location within South Carolina Location within the United States
- Coordinates: 34°31′32″N 82°29′46″W
- Country: United States
- State: South Carolina
- County: Anderson

Area
  - Total: 3.78 sq mi (9.80 km^{2})
  - Land: 3.78 sq mi (9.79 km^{2})
  - Water: 0.0077 sq mi (0.02 km^{2})
- Elevation: 883 ft (269 m)

Population (2020)
  - Total: 4,335
  - Density: 1,147.4/sq mi (443.01/km^{2})
- Time zone: UTC-5 (EST)
  - Summer (DST): UTC-4 (EDT)
- ZIP code: 29627
- Area codes: 864, 821
- FIPS code: 45-05365
- GNIS feature ID: 2403851
- Website: www.cityofbeltonsc.com

Belton is a city in eastern Anderson County, South Carolina. As of the 2020 census, Belton had a population of 4,335.

== History ==
In 1845 a group was created to connect the Piedmont region of South Carolina by rail to the existing rail system which then ran from Columbia to Charleston. The expanded rail line ran through what was to become Belton, with a spur line which ran to the nearby town of Anderson. Because of the population explosion that occurred by the time the railroad had been completed in 1853, the state incorporated the town in 1855, with the boundaries being located within a half mile radius from the new railroad depot.

The city was given the name of Belton after the first president of the Columbia and Greenville Railroad from Newberry, John Belton O'Neal.

The city prospered not only due to the railroad junction, but also because of the area's cotton crop, which led to the establishment of cotton mills.

In 1908, a municipal water system was established. A 155-foot (47 m) reinforced concrete tower with a 165,000-US-gallon (625 m^{3}) capacity was built. Known as the Belton Standpipe, the tower is still in use today. It was listed on the National Register of Historic Places on November 5, 1987. The standpipe is the inspiration for the yearly Belton Standpipe Festival, first held in 1987 as a fundraising event.

In bygone years Belton was the cotton ginning center for South Carolina, with many cotton mills that were part of the heritage.

Belton boasts an arts center that holds regular art exhibitions open to the public. The arts center adds much character and artistic vibrancy to the city, and is available for event rentals and hosting many city events. The old train depot has been completely refurbished and is currently used as a comfortable function venue. Part of the depot is a museum filled with old Belton history.

Tennis is an integral part of Belton's culture. The South Carolina Palmetto championships are held in Belton each year, using local residential tennis courts as part of the competition.

In addition to the Belton Standpipe, the Belton Depot and Chamberlain-Kay House are listed on the National Register of Historic Places.

== Geography ==
Belton is located in eastern Anderson County. It is 11 miles (18 km) east of Anderson, the county seat, by U.S. Routes 76 and 178. Honea Path is 8 miles (13 km) to the southeast by the same highway, and South Carolina Highway 20 leads 26 miles (42 km) north to Greenville.

According to the United States Census Bureau, the city has a total area of 3.9 square miles (10.0 km^{2}), of which 0.012 square miles (0.03 km^{2}), or 0.33%, is water.

== Demographics ==
Historical population
| Census | Pop. | Note | %± |
|---|---|---|---|
| 1880 | 314 | | — |
| 1890 | 494 | | 57.3% |
| 1900 | 826 | | 67.2% |
| 1910 | 1,852 | | 124.2% |
| 1920 | 1,780 | | −3.9% |
| 1930 | 1,765 | | −0.8% |
| 1940 | 2,119 | | 20.1% |
| 1950 | 3,371 | | 59.1% |
| 1960 | 5,106 | | 51.5% |
| 1970 | 5,257 | | 3.0% |
| 1980 | 5,312 | | 1.0% |
| 1990 | 4,646 | | −12.5% |
| 2000 | 4,461 | | −4.0% |
| 2010 | 4,134 | | −7.3% |
| 2020 | 4,335 | | 4.9% |
| 2022 (est.) | 4,444 | | 2.5% |
U.S. Decennial Census

=== 2020 census ===
As of the 2020 census, Belton had a population of 4,335. The median age was 39.3 years. 23.1% of residents were under the age of 18 and 19.2% of residents were 65 years of age or older. For every 100 females there were 86.8 males, and for every 100 females age 18 and over there were 85.0 males age 18 and over.

97.3% of residents lived in urban areas, while 2.7% lived in rural areas.

There were 1,849 households in Belton, of which 30.2% had children under the age of 18 living in them. Of all households, 38.7% were married-couple households, 18.7% were households with a male householder and no spouse or partner present, and 35.2% were households with a female householder and no spouse or partner present. About 30.8% of all households were made up of individuals and 15.7% had someone living alone who was 65 years of age or older.

There were 2,082 housing units, of which 11.2% were vacant. The homeowner vacancy rate was 2.5% and the rental vacancy rate was 5.1%.

Racial composition as of the 2020 census
| Race | Number | Percent |
|---|---|---|
| White | 3,312 | 76.4% |
| Black or African American | 633 | 14.6% |
| American Indian and Alaska Native | 15 | 0.3% |
| Asian | 22 | 0.5% |
| Native Hawaiian and Other Pacific Islander | 1 | 0.0% |
| Some other race | 88 | 2.0% |
| Two or more races | 264 | 6.1% |
| Hispanic or Latino (of any race) | 181 | 4.2% |

=== 2000 census ===
As of the census of 2000, there were 4,461 people, 1,948 households, and 1,275 families residing in the city. The population density was 1,158.2 inhabitants per square mile (447.2/km^{2}). There were 2,129 housing units at an average density of 552.7 per square mile (213.4/km^{2}). The racial makeup of the city was 80.52% White, 17.51% African American, 0.38% Native American, 0.27% Asian, 0.34% from other races, and 0.99% from two or more races. Hispanic or Latino of any race were 1.79% of the population.

There were 1,948 households, out of which 25.9% had children under the age of 18 living with them, 45.8% were married couples living together, 15.5% had a female householder with no husband present, and 34.5% were non-families. 31.3% of all households were made up of individuals, and 16.9% had someone living alone who was 65 years of age or older. The average household size was 2.29 and the average family size was 2.84.

In the city, the population was spread out, with 22.9% under the age of 18, 7.6% from 18 to 24, 26.4% from 25 to 44, 23.7% from 45 to 64, and 19.4% who were 65 years of age or older. The median age was 40 years. For every 100 females, there were 82.2 males. For every 100 females age 18 and over, there were 78.0 males. The median income for a household in the city was $28,191, and the median income for a family was $36,531. Males had a median income of $30,100 versus $22,470 for females. The per capita income for the city was $16,970. About 15.2% of families and 16.3% of the population were below the poverty line, including 23.2% of those under age 18 and 12.0% of those age 65 or over.

== Education ==
Public education in Belton is administered by Anderson County School District Two. The district operates several elementary schools, Belton Middle School and Belton-Honea Path High School.

Belton has a public library, a branch of the Anderson County Library System.

== Notable people ==
- William L. Ball
- Dave Cockrum
- Matthew LeCroy
- Ralph McT. Pennell, U.S. Army major general
- Viola Thompson
