= Jones M. Chamblee =

American politician (born 1936)

Member of the South Carolina House of Representatives from the 8th district
- In office 1975–1976

Personal details
- Born: October 13, 1936 (age 89) Anderson, South Carolina
- Party: Democratic
- Occupation: farmer, realtor

Jones M. Chamblee (born October 13, 1936) was an American politician in the state of South Carolina. He served in the South Carolina House of Representatives as a member of the Democratic Party from 1975 to 1976, representing Anderson County, South Carolina. He was a farmer and realtor.
