= Caldwell-Johnson-Morris Cottage =

Historic house in South Carolina, United States

- U.S. National Register of Historic Places
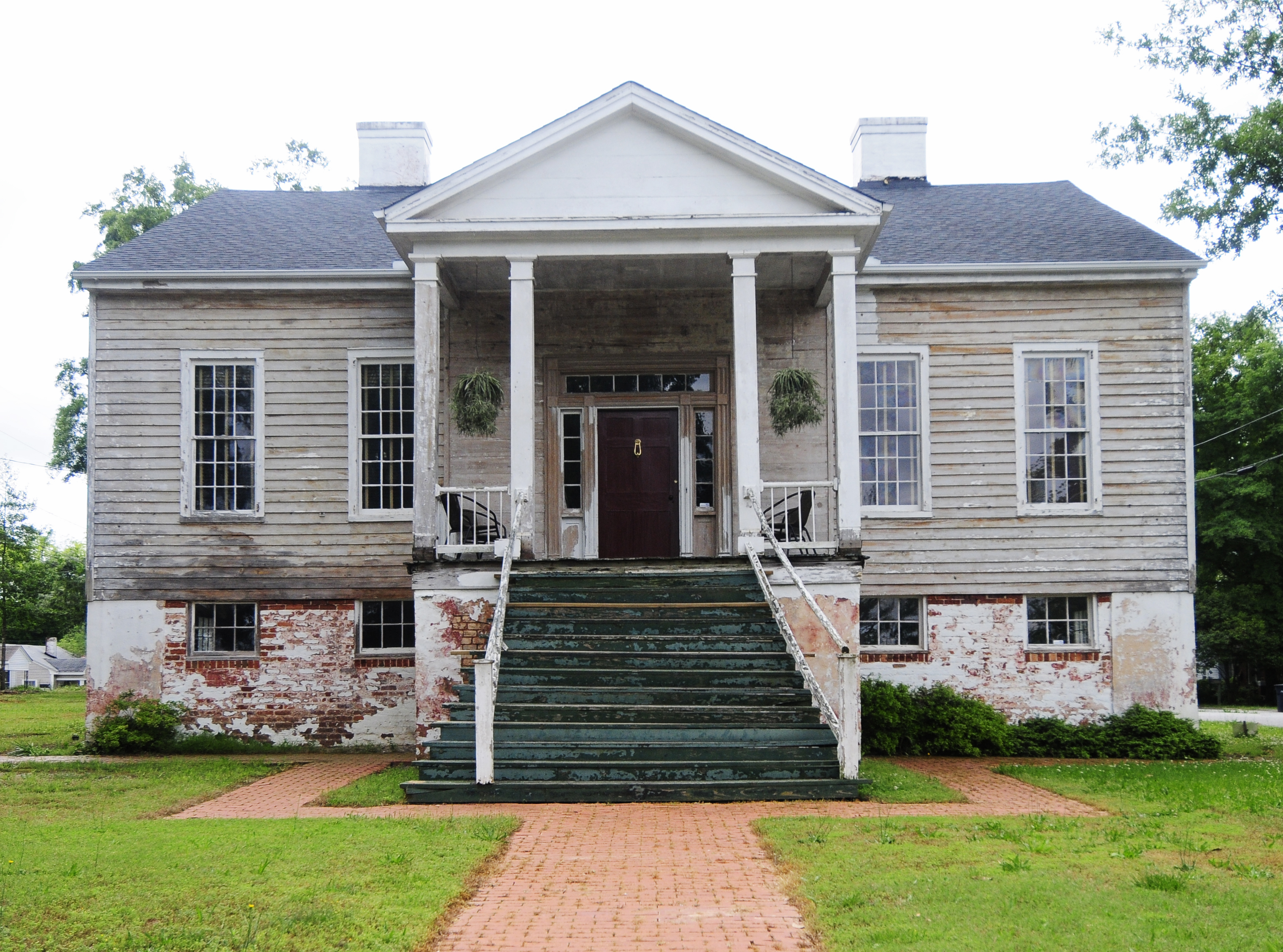

- Location within South Carolina Location within the United States
- Location: 220 E. Morris St., Anderson, South Carolina
- Coordinates: 34°29′55″N 82°38′50″W
- Area: 0.5 acres (0.20 ha)
- Built: 1851
- Architectural style: Raised Cottage
- NRHP reference No.: 71000740
- Added to NRHP: October 7, 1971

The Caldwell-Johnson-Morris Cottage is located in Anderson, South Carolina. It was constructed around 1851, and is historically significant because it illustrates the “raised cottage” genre of architecture, a style that became popular in the 19th century.

Specific features of this style include a raised brick basement and high wooden steps, both of which contribute to a two-story illusion. This landmark may easily be viewed from the public street. It was listed in the National Register on October 7, 1971.
