= Ralph John Ramer House =

Historic house in South Carolina, United States

- U.S. National Register of Historic Places
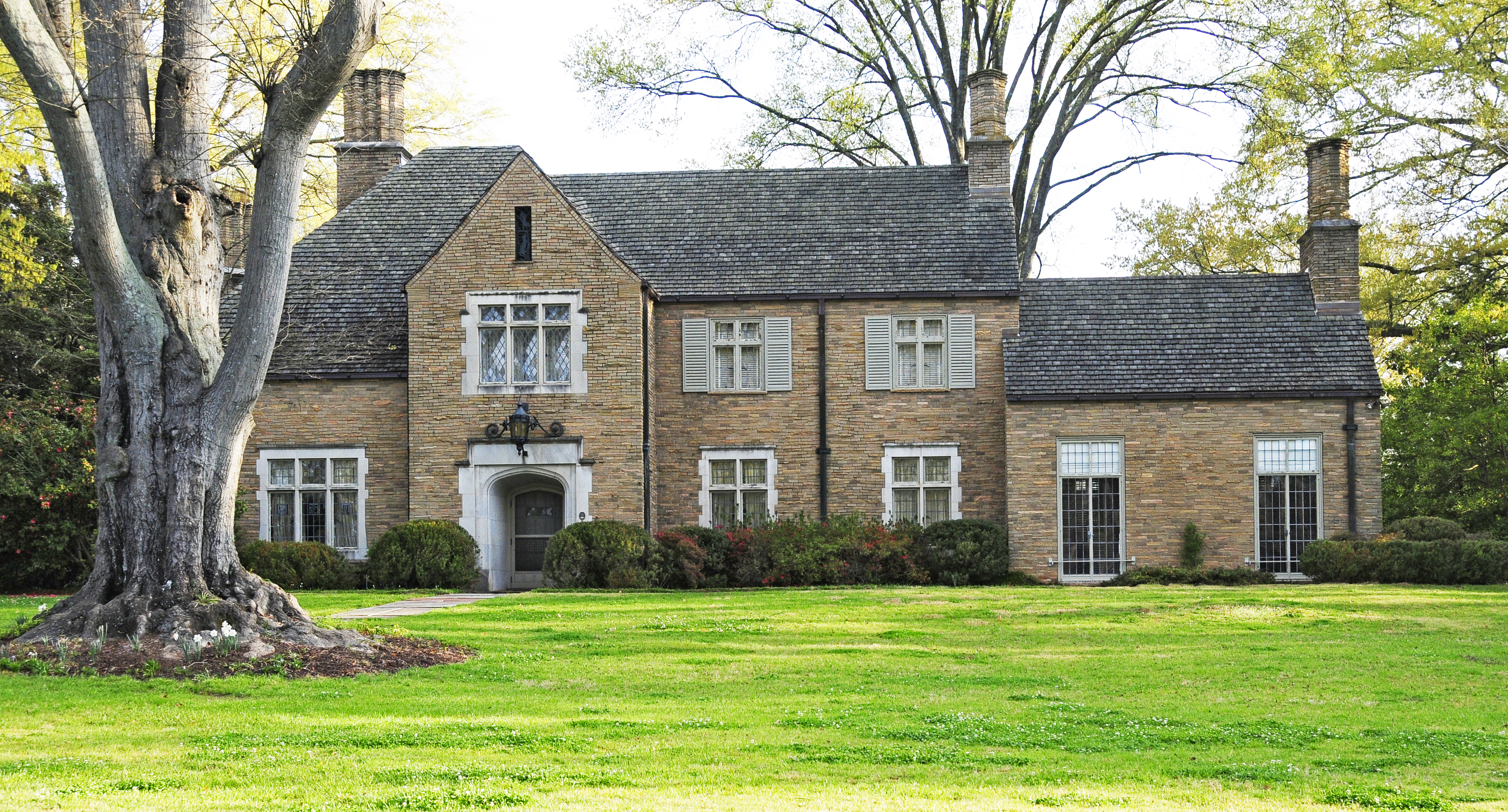

- Location within South Carolina Location within the United States
- Location: 402 Boulevard, Anderson, South Carolina
- Coordinates: 34°30′49″N 82°38′27″W
- Area: 2 acres (0.81 ha)
- Built: 1930
- Architect: Gaines, Henry Irven
- Architectural style: Tudor Revival
- NRHP reference No.: 92000023
- Added to NRHP: February 10, 1992

The Ralph John Ramer House, is located near the downtown area of Anderson, South Carolina. The house was built in 1930 and is historically significant as an excellent example of an early-20th century Tudor Revival residence. Ramer was a leading Anderson businessman, government official, military officer and civic leader. Much of the noteworthy architectural detail of this house can be viewed from the public road that fronts the grounds. The house was listed in the National Register on February 10, 1992.
