= Belton station =

- Belton Depot
- U.S. National Register of Historic Places
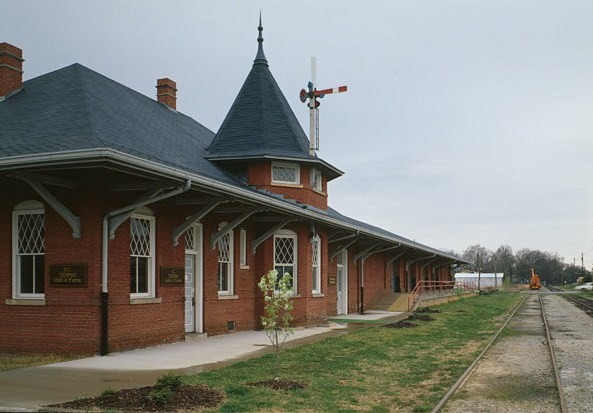

- Location within South Carolina Location within the United States
- Location: 50 N. Main St, Public Sq, Belton, South Carolina, United States
- Coordinates: 34°31′21″N 82°29′41″W
- Area: less than one acre
- Built: 1910
- Architect: Southern Railway Office of Chief Engineer
- Architectural style: Queen Anne, Romanesque
- NRHP reference No.: 79002373
- Added to NRHP: August 13, 1979

The Belton Depot, located in Belton, Anderson County, South Carolina was constructed by the Southern Railway company around 1910 and was listed in the National Historic Register on August 13, 1979. Historically known as the Southern Railway Combined Depot, it replaced several small buildings used by the company.

Due to its location near the town square of Belton, South Carolina, it was an important focal point of the area. After the loss of passenger service in the 1960s and a slowdown in freight shipping, the depot was abandoned by the rail company and acquired by the city. Restoration efforts were completed in 1983 and a portion of the depot was used as a branch of the Anderson County Library.

The Belton Area Museum Association was granted ownership of the depot in 2001 and after the library moved to a new building in 2004, a three-year-long process of fundraising, rehabilitation and renovation of the building was undertaken. After the completion in 2006, the depot became the new home to the Ruth Drake Museum and the South Carolina Tennis Hall of Fame Museum.
