= Kennedy Street School =

- U.S. National Register of Historic Places
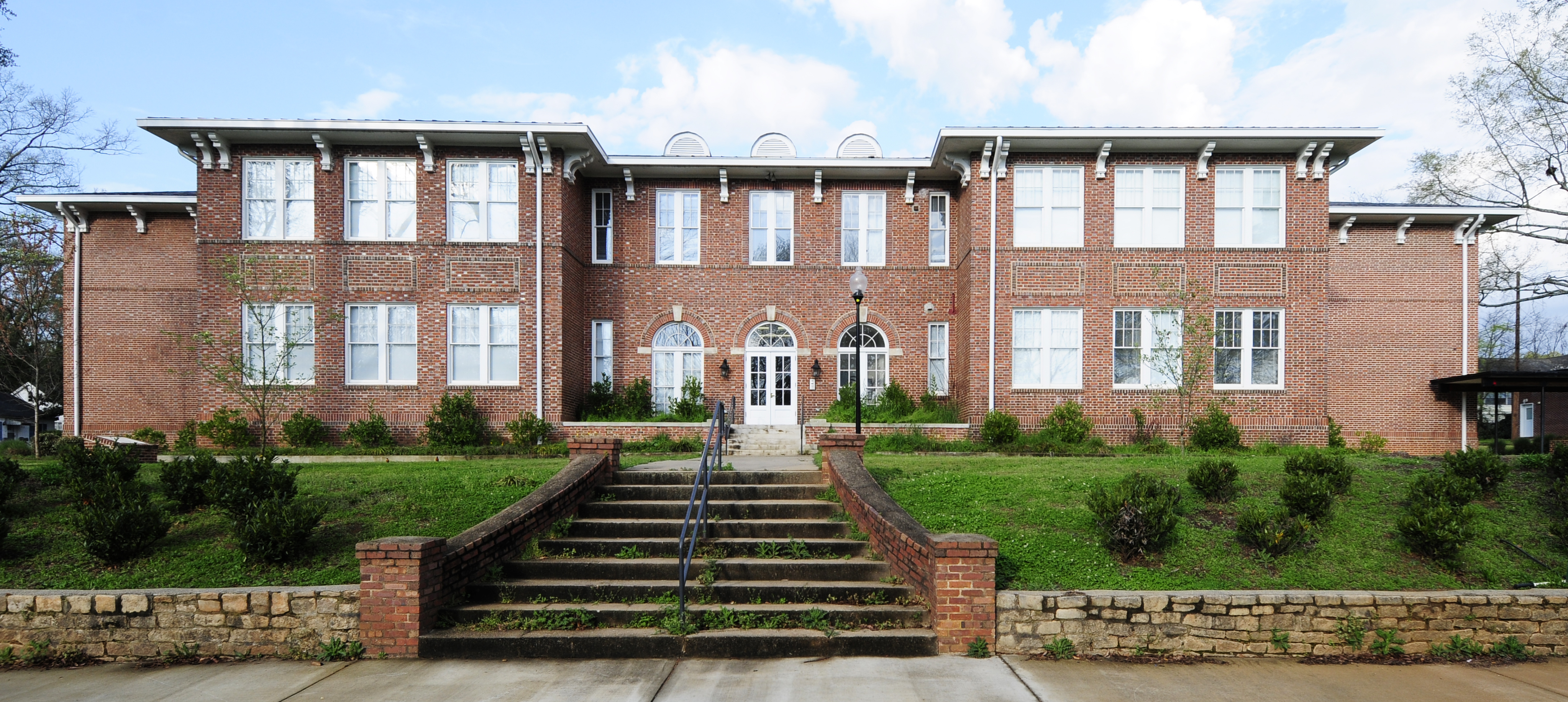

- Location within South Carolina Location within the United States
- Location: 816 Kennedy St., Anderson, South Carolina
- Coordinates: 34°29′54″N 82°38′34″W
- Area: 2.5 acres (1.0 ha)
- Architect: Casey, J.H.; Linley, John W.
- Architectural style: Classical Revival
- NRHP reference No.: 07001111
- Added to NRHP: October 24, 2007

The Kennedy Street School is located near the downtown area of Anderson, South Carolina. It was constructed in 1913, and is considered historically significant primarily because its architectural style is considered representative and typical of the Commercial style with Classical Revival details favored in the first quarter of the 20th century. The auditorium, added in 1960, is an excellent example of Modern style architecture. The 1913 school building was designed by architect Joseph Huntley Casey of Anderson, S.C. The Kennedy Street School was listed in the National Register on October 24, 2007.
