= Elizabeth Spann Craig =

American writer of mystery novels

Elizabeth Spann Craig is an American writer of mystery novels.

== Biography ==
Craig was raised in Anderson, South Carolina, and has since resided in Alabama and North Carolina, where in 2014 she lives with her husband and two children. She graduated with a B.A. in English from Presbyterian College in Clinton, South Carolina.

Craig's first book, Pretty is as Pretty Dies, was published by Midnight Ink, imprint of Llewellyn, in 2009. Later books in this series were published independently by the author.

The first of the Memphis Barbeque Mysteries, Delicious and Suspicious, was written under Craig's "Riley Adams" pen name, and was released from Penguin Books in 2010. Craig's Southern Quilting Mysteries launched in 2012 from Penguin's Signet imprint. In the series, former art museum curator Beatrice Coleman retires to a quiet North Carolina mountain village and takes up quilting and sleuthing.

Craig blogs on the writing craft and the publishing industry at her website which was named as one of the 101 best websites for writers from 2010–2013 by Writer's Digest. She and Mike Fleming of Hiveword also manage the Writer’s Knowledge Base–a free search engine to help writers find resources.

In 2015, Craig was featured in Authors Luncheon at the Macon, Georgia International Cherry Blossom Festival.

== Selected works ==
The Memphis Barbeque Mysteries

Writing with pseudonym Riley Adams

- Delicious and Suspicious Berkley Prime, (2010)
- Finger Lickin' Dead Berkley Prime, (2011)
- Hickory Smoked Homicide Berkley Prime, (2011)
- Rubbed Out Berkley Prime, (2013)

The Southern Quilting Mysteries

- Quilt or Innocence Obsidian, (2012)
- Knot What it Seams Obsidian, (2013)
- Quilt Trip Penguin, (2013)
- Shear Trouble (2014)
- Tying the Knot New American Library (2015)

The Myrtle Clover Mysteries

- Pretty is as Pretty Dies Midnight Ink, (2009)
- Progressive Dinner Deadly GunnBooks, (2011)
- A Dyeing Shame Publisher: Elizabeth Spann Craig (2011)
- A Body in the Backyard Publisher unknown (2012)
- Death at a Drop-In Create Space, (2013)
- A Body at Book Club Publisher unknown, (2014)
- Death Pays a Visit CreateSpace (2014)
- A Body at Bunco Publisher: Elizabeth Spann Craig, (2015)
