= Chamberlain-Kay House =

Historic house in South Carolina, United States

- U.S. National Register of Historic Places
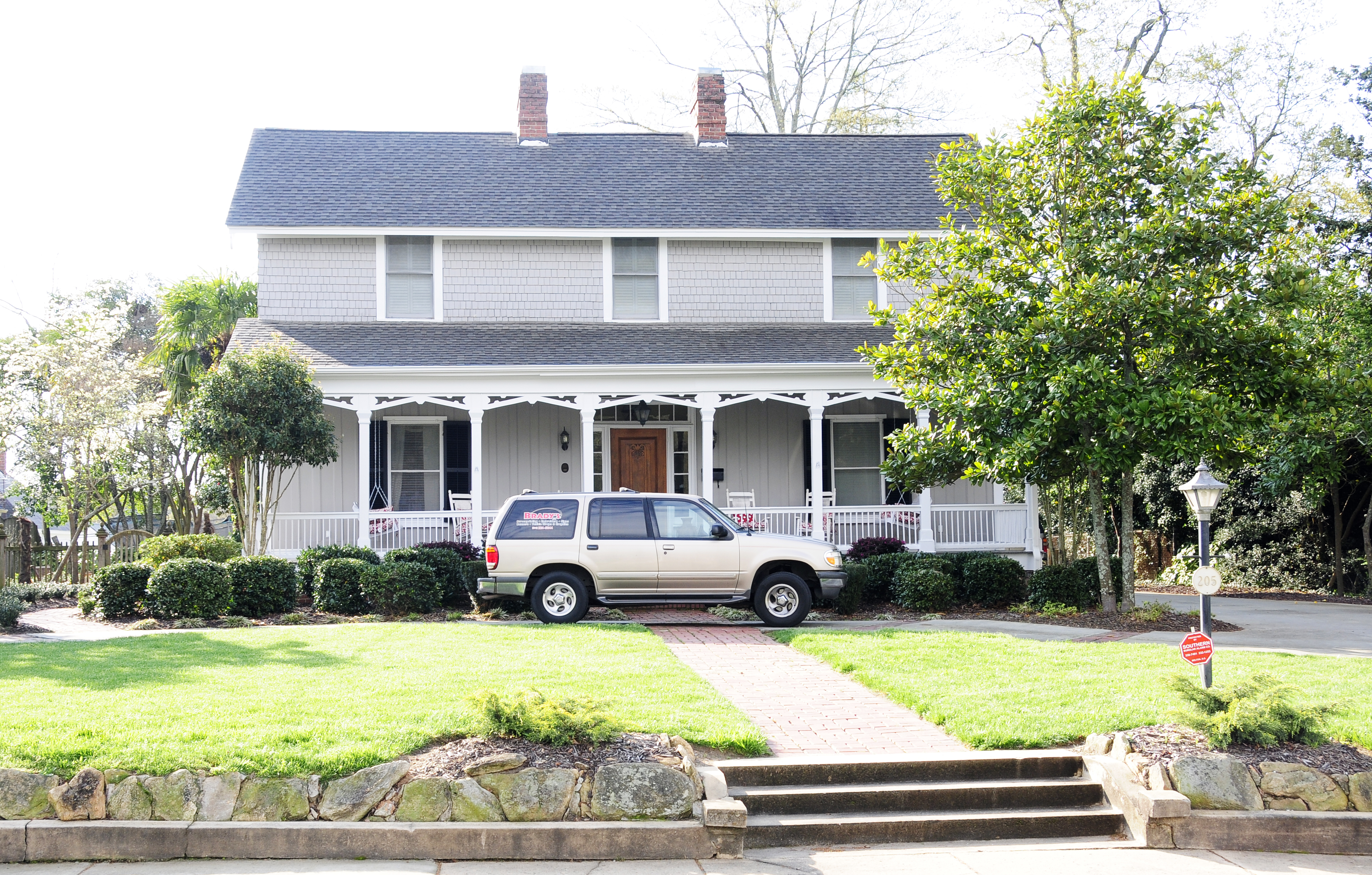

- Location within South Carolina Location within the United States
- Location: 205 River St., Belton, South Carolina
- Coordinates: 34°31′26″N 82°29′29″W
- Area: 0.5 acres (0.20 ha)
- Built: 1922
- Architectural style: Greek Revival, Queen Anne, Carpenter Gothic
- NRHP reference No.: 80003652
- Added to NRHP: November 25, 1980

The Chamberlain-Kay House is located in Belton, a city in Anderson County, South Carolina. The house was built around 1854 as a residence for Charles C. Chamberlain. Chamberlain was the first supervisor of the rail line from Belton to Greenville. The home is believed to be one of the oldest residences in Belton. Many changes have been made to the home over the years, creating a rather amalgamated if not historically diluted building. The home was listed in the National Historic Register on November 25, 1980.
