= Dr. Samuel Marshall Orr House =

Historic house in South Carolina, United States

- U.S. National Register of Historic Places
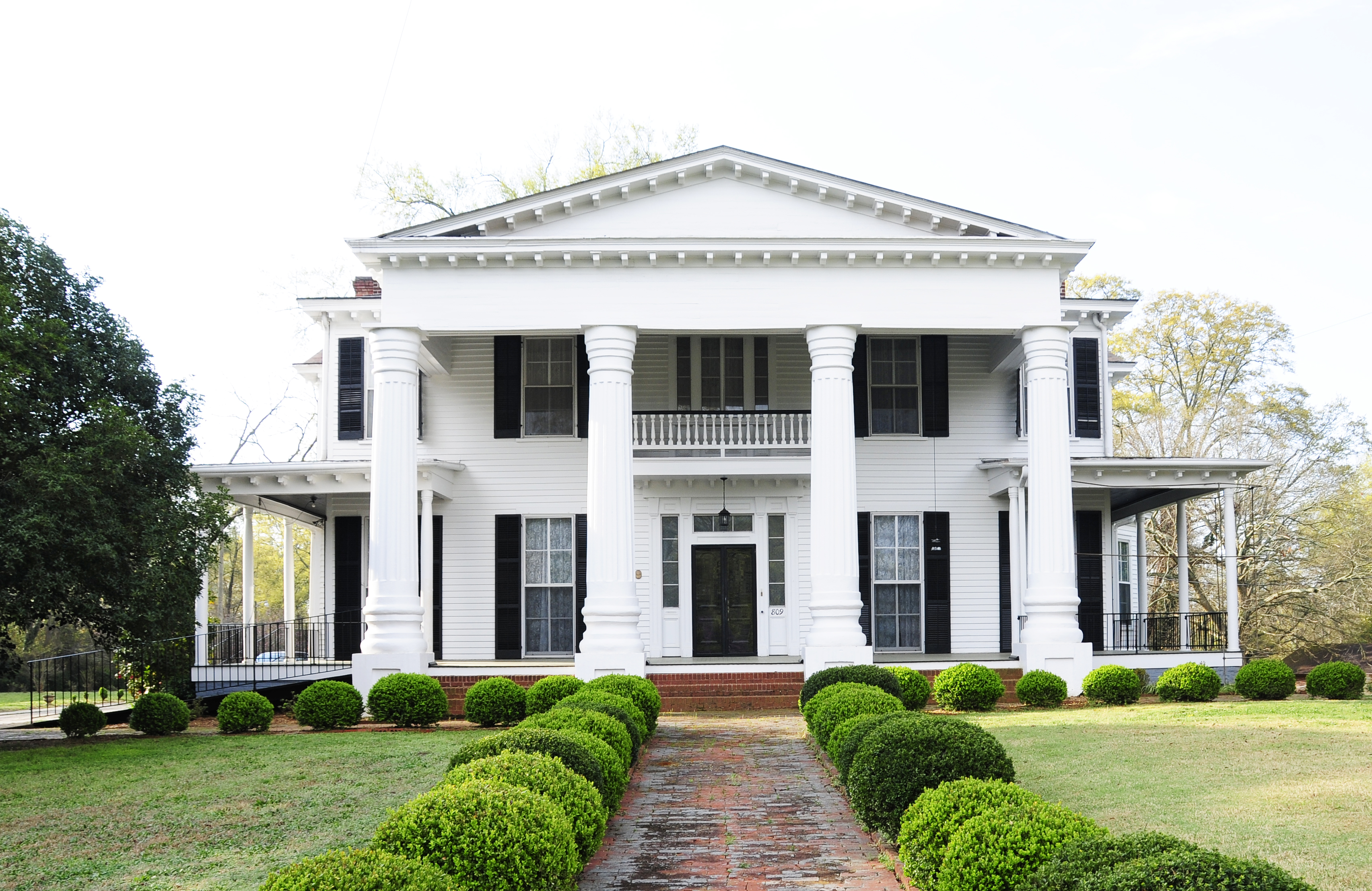

- Location within South Carolina Location within the United States
- Location: 809 W. Market St., Anderson, South Carolina
- Coordinates: 34°30′0″N 82°39′39″W
- Area: 3 acres (1.2 ha)
- Built: 1885
- Architectural style: Central Hall, Double-pile
- NRHP reference No.: 73001673
- Added to NRHP: April 13, 1973

The Dr. Samuel Marshall Orr House, is an historic house located in Anderson, South Carolina.

Built in 1885, the two-story Greek Revival style house features a front façade of four columns that support a broad, plain entablature with low-sloped, boxed cornice pediment. The cornices of the hipped tin-covered roof, pediments, and shed roofs of side porches are adorned with modillions.

The main entrance consists of double doors surrounded by a three-light transom, four-light rectangular sidelights, and a pilaster molding that supports a paneled entablature. Directly above the main entrance a double casement window flanked by single casements opens onto a small balcony with a wooden balustrade.

Dr. Orr practiced medicine in Anderson for 25 years, and was active in the community. The house was listed in the National Register on April 13, 1973.
