= Woodson Farmstead =

Historic house in South Carolina, United States

- U.S. National Register of Historic Places
- Location within South Carolina Location within the United States
- Location: 3 Powdersville Main, Greenville, South Carolina
- Coordinates: 34°47′20″N 82°29′08″W
- Area: 21.6 acres (8.7 ha)
- Built: 1895
- Built by: John O. Sheck
- Architectural style: Victorian eclectic
- NRHP reference No.: 98000422
- Added to NRHP: April 30, 1998

Woodson Farmstead was a historic agricultural property located off of Three Bridges Road near the intersection of South Carolina Highway 153 in Powdersville, South Carolina. It consisted of an early twentieth century fruit and pecan grove, a ca. 1875 well house and cotton house and a farmhouse built in 1895. The property was originally purchased in 1850 by William Woodson, who sold the property to his nephew, James Allen Woodson in 1892. It is listed on the National Register of Historic Places (NRHP).

In 1895, James Woodson commissioned Washington, D.C.–based builder John O. Scheck to design and construct his farmhouse. Unlike a typical farmhouse in the region, the two-story house was built with Eastlake and Queen Anne ornamentation including stained glass windows and an elaborately detailed porch.

The farmhouse was the last building standing and it was demolished in 2011. However, the farmstead has not been delisted from the NRHP as of November 13, 2013.
