= Anderson Historic District (Anderson, South Carolina) =

Historic district in South Carolina, United States

- U.S. National Register of Historic Places
- U.S. Historic district
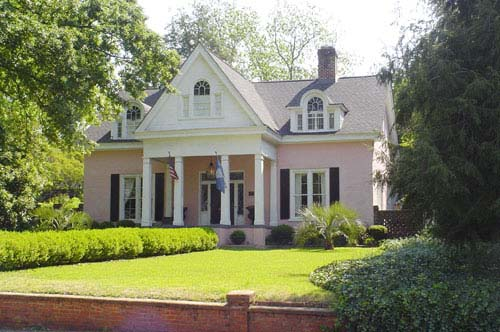
- House in the Anderson National Register Historic District in Anderson, SC

- Location within South Carolina Location within the United States
- Location: Bounded by Hampton, Main, Franklin, McDuffie, Benson, and Fant Sts., Anderson, South Carolina
- Coordinates: 34°30′00″N 82°38′52″W
- Area: 500 acres (200 ha)
- Built: 1912
- Architectural style: Classical Revival, Other, Romanesque, Eclectic
- NRHP reference No.: 71000739
- Added to NRHP: December 13, 1971

The city of Anderson, South Carolina, began in 1826 with the formation of Anderson County. The amount of cotton being grown in the area allowed for the construction of mills and the town developed. Specific to the Anderson Historic District, much is residential and the homes show a number of different architectural styles, including Greek Revival, Romanesque Revival, Victorian, and Colonial Revival. Some modern buildings have been interspersed in the district, but much of the very accessible area is historically intact. The Anderson Historic District was listed in the National Register on December 13, 1971.
