= Belton Standpipe (Belton, South Carolina) =

- U.S. National Register of Historic Places
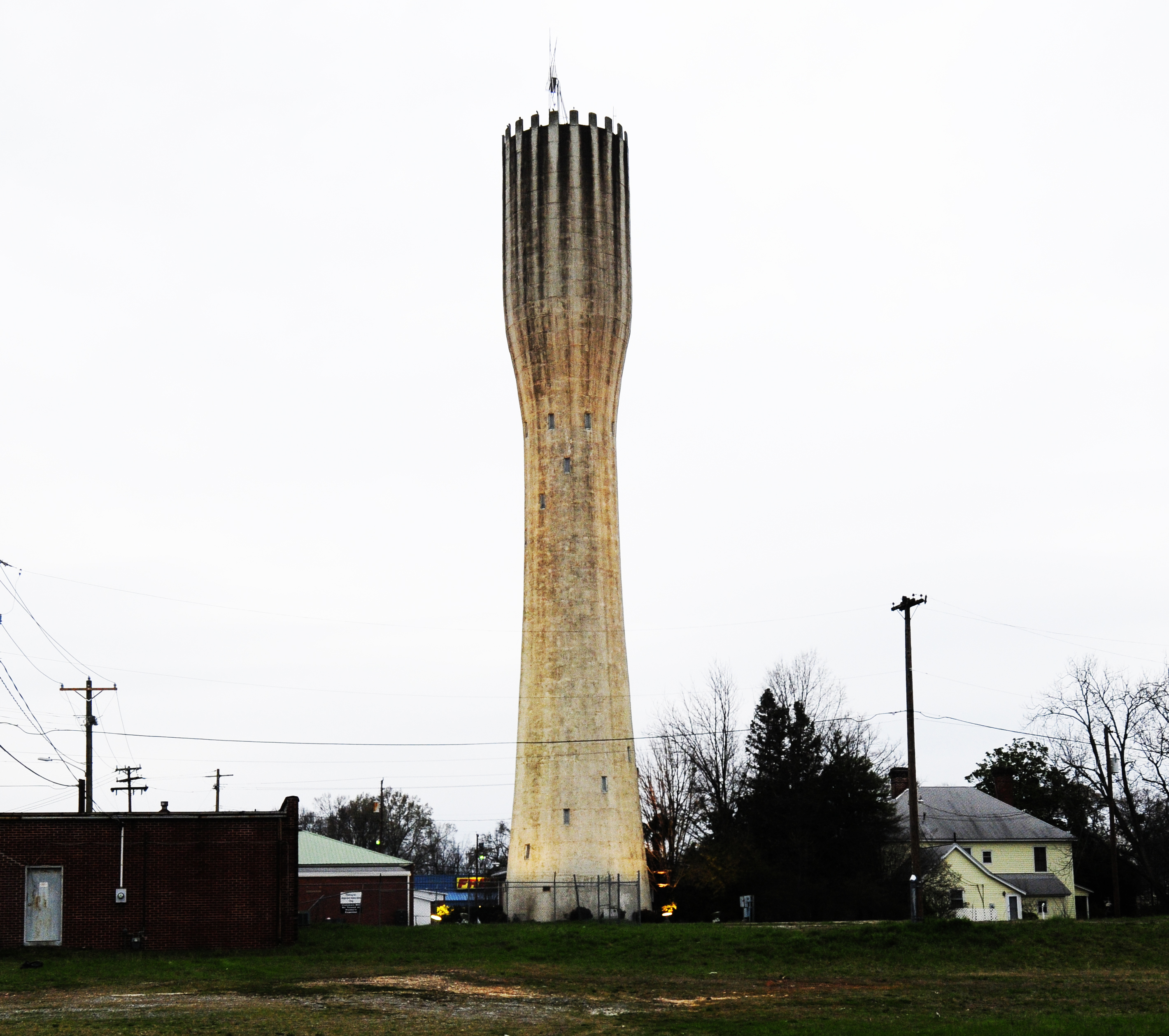
- The Standpipe, as seen from Campbell Street, 2012

- Location within South Carolina Location within the United States
- Location: McGee Way, Near Campbell St. Belton, South Carolina, United States
- Coordinates: 34°31′21″N 82°29′30″W
- Area: 0.3 acres (0.12 ha)
- Built: 1908
- Built by: J. C. McMurray
- NRHP reference No.: 87001948
- Added to NRHP: November 5, 1987

The Belton Standpipe, in Belton, South Carolina, historically known as the Belton Waterworks Tower, is a 155-foot high concrete water tower located near the downtown area. Construction on the tower began in 1908 and was completed in 1909. It is the tallest of three standpipe water towers in the state.

The tower was listed in the National Register of Historic Places on November 5, 1987. A complete renovation of the structure began in 1989, and was completed in 1991.

It is an early example of water storage facilities using reinforced concrete construction, a material that would eventually become popular in the United States. The tank, located at the top of the tower, holds 165,000 gallons of water that flows through a 10-inch pipe located in the center of the tower.

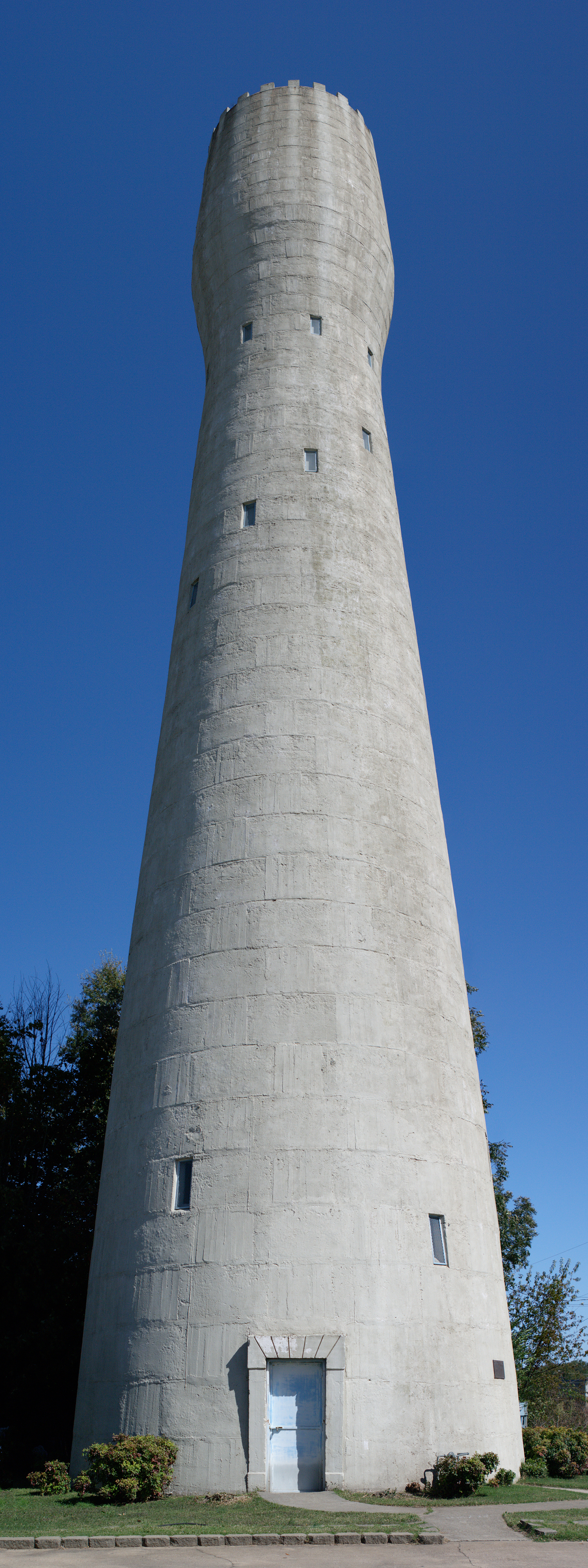
Belton Standpipe from front in October, 2012
