= North Anderson Historic District =

Historic district in South Carolina, United States

- U.S. National Register of Historic Places
- U.S. Historic district
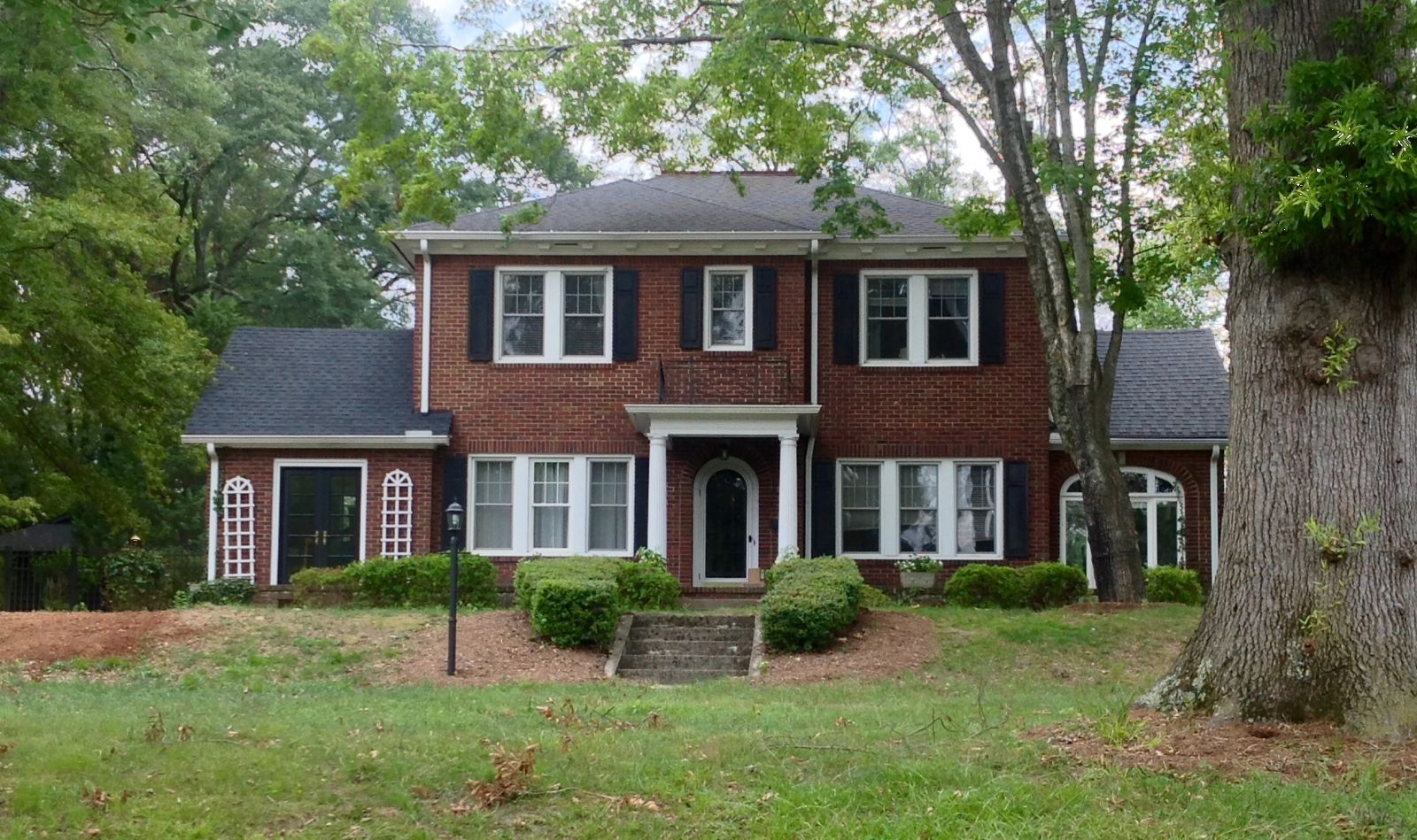

- Location within South Carolina Location within the United States
- Location: E. and W. North Ave. between Boundary St. and Mauldin Dr., including parts of Edgewood Dr. Blair St., Central Ave., Anderson, South Carolina
- Coordinates: 34°31′16″N 82°39′30″W
- Area: 86.9 acres (35.2 ha)
- Built: 1913
- Architectural style: Late 19th And 20th Century Revivals, Late 19th And Early 20th Century American Movements
- NRHP reference No.: 08000733
- Added to NRHP: July 31, 2008

The North Anderson Historic District, located in Anderson, South Carolina. The historic district is an architecturally significant area that offers an impressive collection of 20th century Revivals and American Movements. Further, the district is noteworthy for it further represents the development and transition of Anderson from a rural community to a planned city with well-thought out streets and neighborhoods. The district consists of over 147 homes, a number of garages and a few parks. Architectural styles include early twentieth century Revival styles including Tudor, Colonial, and Neo-Classical. The district was listed in the National Register of Historic Places on July 31, 2008.
