= Denver Downs Farmstead =

Historic house in South Carolina, United States

- U.S. National Register of Historic Places
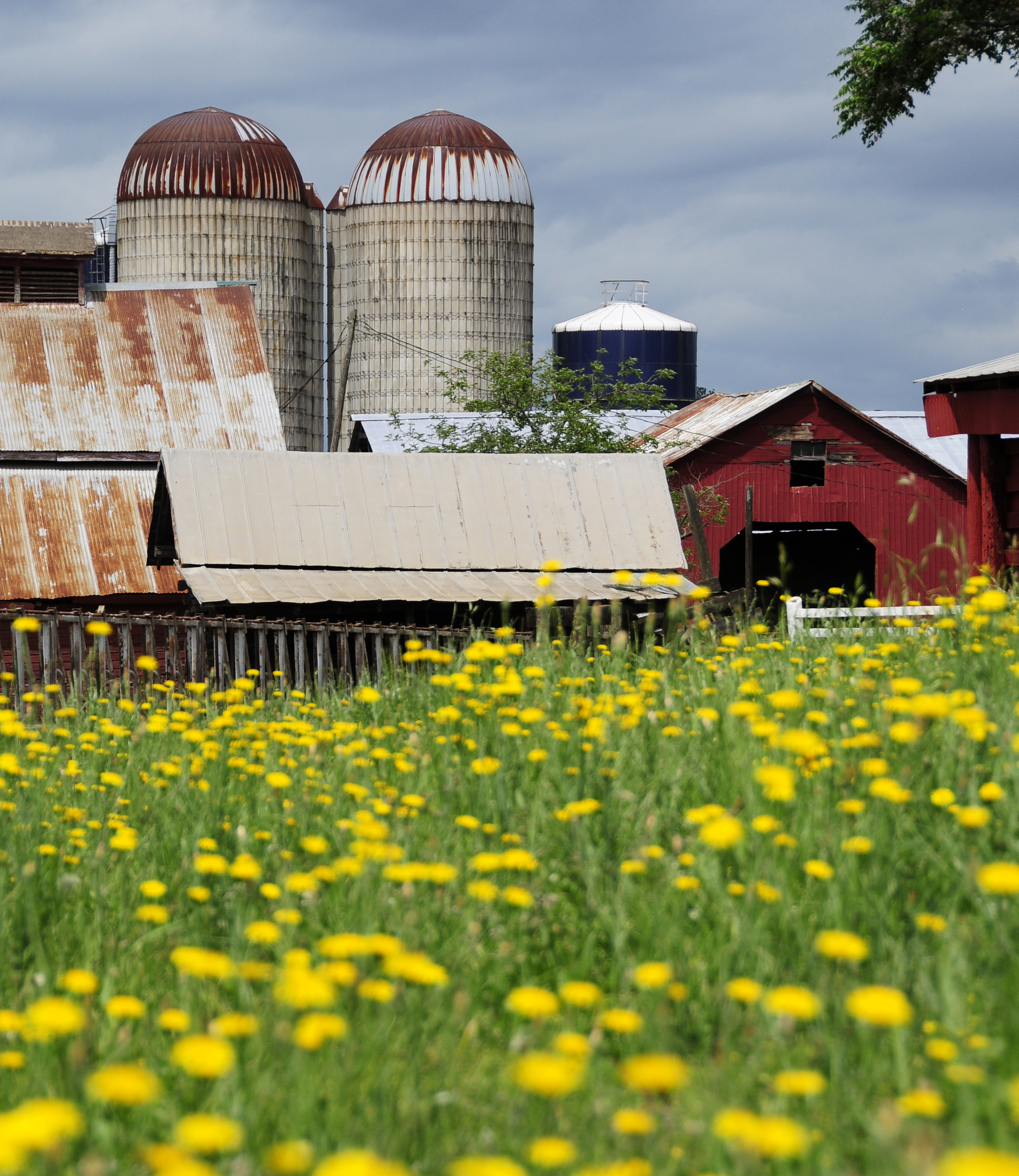

- Location within South Carolina Location within the United States
- Nearest city: Anderson, South Carolina
- Coordinates: 34°34′48″N 82°43′28″W
- Area: 20 acres (8.1 ha)
- Built: 1872
- Architect: Garrison, William Dunkling
- Architectural style: Colonial Revival
- NRHP reference No.: 07000118
- Added to NRHP: March 7, 2007

Denver Downs Farmstead, also known as Garrison Farm, is an historic farm on the outskirts of Anderson, South Carolina, USA.

Denver Downs is historically and architecturally significant as an extant working farm dating from 1872. The farmstead consists of 464 acres (188 ha), but only 20 acres (8.1 ha) are considered to be part of this Historic Register nomination. In 1974, the farmstead was recognized as a "Century Farm", having been owned and operated by the same family for 100 years. Denver Downs Farmstead was listed in the National Register March 7, 2007.

The main house is a large Colonial Revival farmhouse with white clapboard siding, a metal roof and a wraparound porch. The farmstead is bordered on one side by the Clemson Highway, but it is possible to view the farm from one of the public roads that cut through the property.
