= Anderson College Historic District =

Historic district in South Carolina, United States

- U.S. National Register of Historic Places
- U.S. Historic district
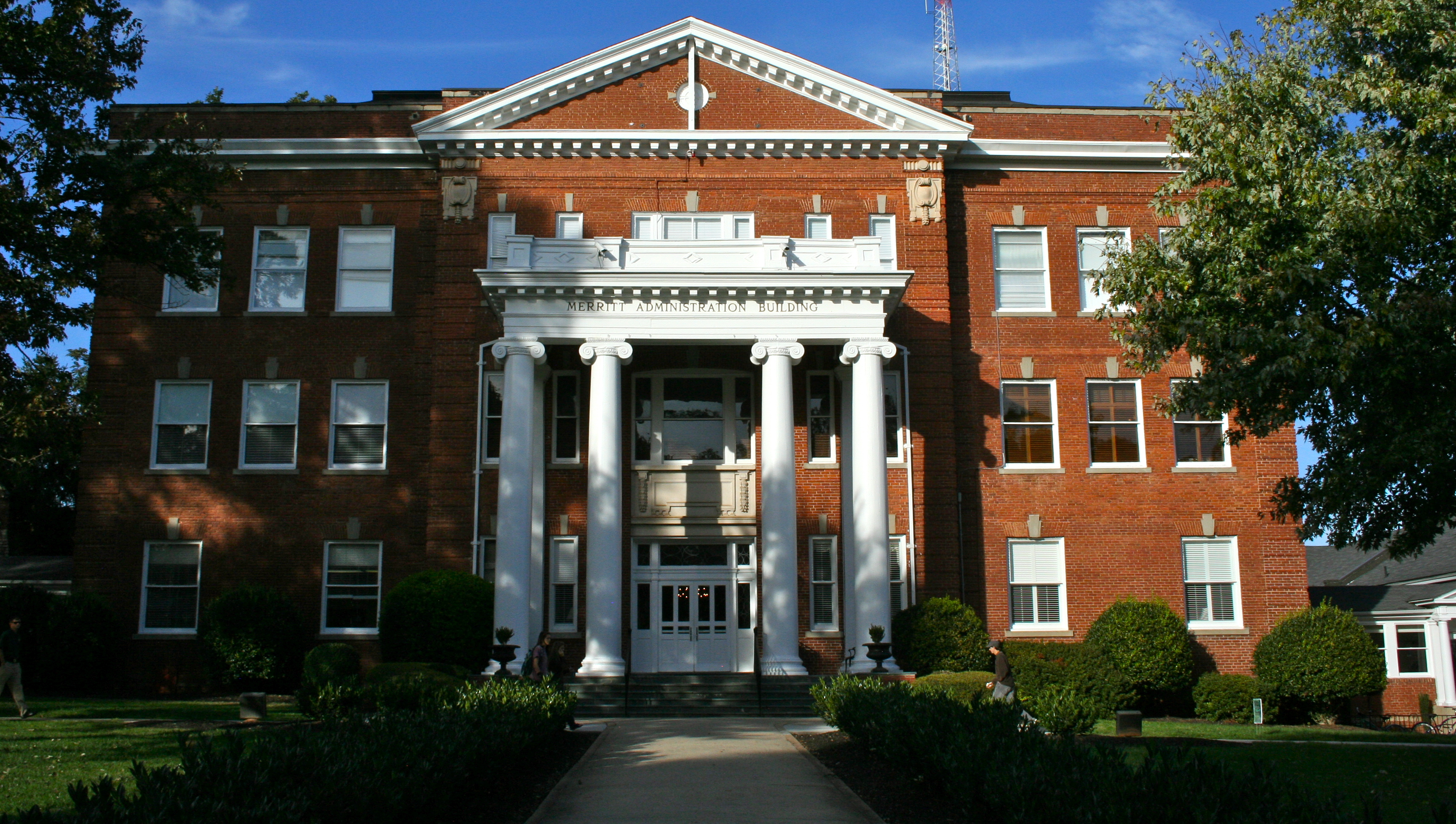
- The Merritt Administration Building in October, 2012

- Location within South Carolina Location within the United States
- Location: 316 Boulevard Ave., Anderson, South Carolina
- Coordinates: 34°30′49″N 82°38′18″W
- Area: 8 acres (3.2 ha)
- Built: 1912
- Architect: Joseph L. Casey
- Architectural style: Late 19th And 20th Century Revivals
- NRHP reference No.: 98000556
- Added to NRHP: May 20, 1998

The Anderson College Historic District is a historic district on the campus of Anderson University in Anderson, South Carolina. It consists of six contributing properties (five buildings and one site) spread out over 8 acres (3.2 ha). The district was listed on the National Register of Historic Places in 1998.

The Anderson College Historic District includes the following Anderson University buildings/areas:

- The main entrance (Boulevard)
- Merritt Administration Building
- Denmark Hall
- West Loggia
- East Loggia
- Pratt Hall
- Vandiver Hall
- The Pratt and Vandiver Hall connector
- The Lodge
- Lastly, all of the university grounds
