= Anderson Downtown Historic District (Anderson, South Carolina) =

Historic district in South Carolina, United States

- U.S. National Register of Historic Places
- U.S. Historic district
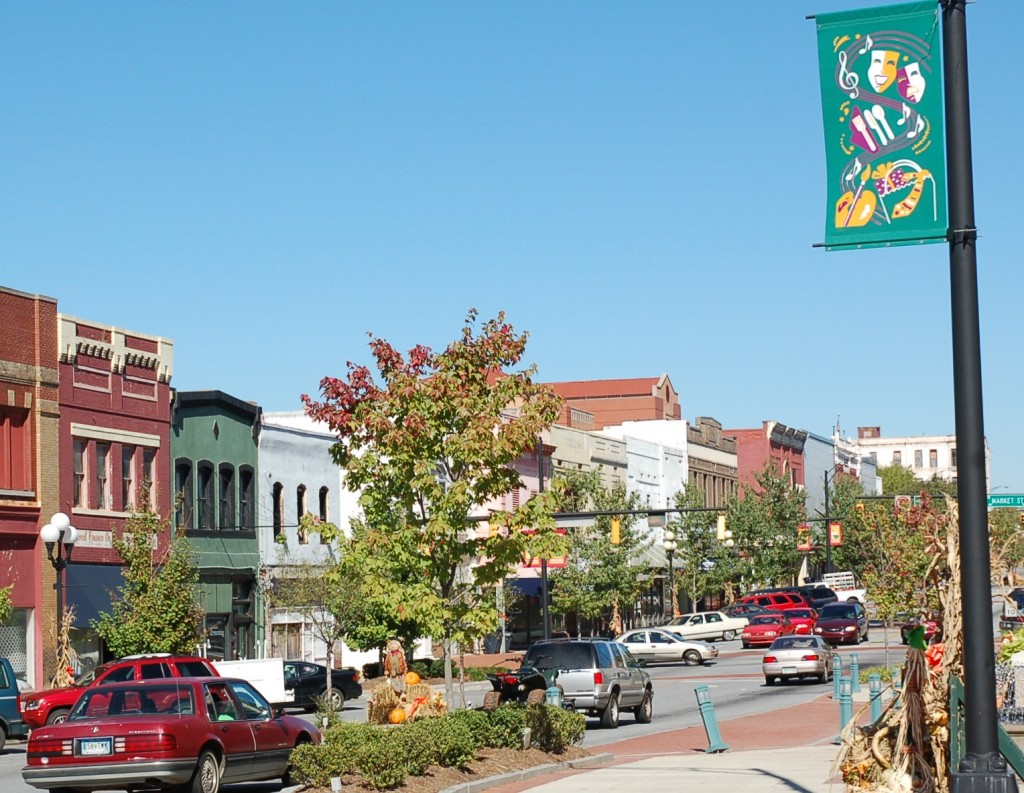
- Main Street

- Location within South Carolina Location within the United States
- Location: Main St. between Tribble and Market Sts. (original) and 402 N. Main St., 400-420 S Main & 109 W Market Sts. (increases), Anderson, South Carolina
- Coordinates: 34°29′50″N 82°38′59″W
- Area: 14.5 acres (5.9 ha); 0.5 acres (0.20 ha)
- Built: 1870 (original) and 1924 (increase)
- Architect: Baldwin, James J.; Casey, Joseph H. (increase)
- Architectural style: Early Commercial; Romanesque (original)
- NRHP reference No.: 79002372 (original); 87001996 (increase 1); 100002525 (increase 2)

Significant dates
- Added to NRHP: February 23, 1979
- Boundary increases: November 5, 1987; May 24, 2018

Anderson Downtown Historic District in Anderson, South Carolina, originally built in the late 19th century, is a historic district that was listed on the National Register of Historic Places in 1979.

The district was increased in 1987 to include a hotel building at 402 N. Main Street, and again in 2018.

== National Register Properties ==
National Register properties within the district include:

- Palmetto Building circa 1909, 201 S. Murray Avenue (formerly Sullivan Hardware Company Warehouse)
- Sullivan Building circa 1881, 208 S. Main St. (former Sullivan Hardware Store, now Sullivan's Metropolitan Grill)
- Chiquola Condominiums circa 1888, 100 W. Whitner St. (formerly Chiquola Hotel and Plaza Hotel) Courthouse Square/Plaza
- Historic Anderson County Courthouse, circa 1898, 101 S. Main St., Courthouse Square/Plaza
- Robert Anderson Fountain, 202 E. Greenville St. (Anderson County Museum, formerly located in the Courthouse Square/Plaza)
- Anderson City Hall/Police Department, 401 S. Main St.
- First Federal Post Office Building circa 1909, 401 N. Main St.
- Anderson County Arts Center circa 1905, 405 N. Main St. (former Carnegie Library Building)
- The Calhoun Historic Lofts circa early 1920s, 402 N. Main St. (former John C. Calhoun Hotel)

== Chiquola Hotel ==
The Hotel Chiquola was built in 1888 in Anderson, South Carolina. By the 1930s the Hotel Chiquola had been renamed Plaza Hotel and had suffered many setbacks largely due to the lack of parking and private restrooms. By the 1960s the Plaza was scarcely used and began to decline even further. In the 1980s the building was home to a few ground level businesses and a few retirement tenants. The Chiquola faced demolition several times in the 1990s but was revived in 2006 by a group of investors that restored the architectural elements long since removed and restored the Chiquola to luxury condominiums, and a private club with restaurant and bar.
