= Anderson, South Carolina =

Anderson
- City
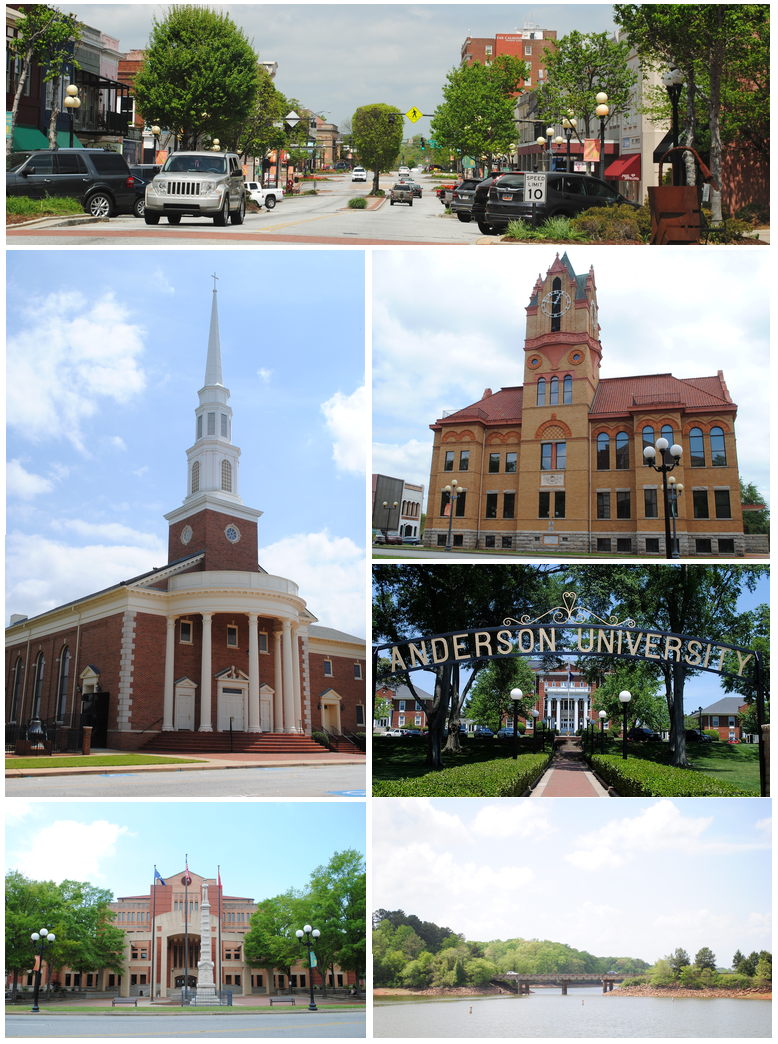
- Top, left to right: Downtown Anderson, First Baptist Church of Anderson, Old Anderson County Courthouse, Anderson University, Anderson County Courthouse and Confederate Monument, Lake Hartwell view from City of Anderson Recreation Park

- Flag Seal
- Nicknames: The Electric City, Friendliest City in South Carolina
- Motto: "Teamwork | Integrity | Professionalism"
- Interactive map of Anderson
- Location within South Carolina Location within the United States Location within North America
- Coordinates: 34°30′12″N 82°38′30″W
- Country: United States
- State: South Carolina
- County: Anderson
- Founded: December 1826
- Incorporated: December 19, 1833
- Named for: Robert Anderson

Government
  - Type: Council–manager

Area
  - City: 15.86 sq mi (41.09 km^{2})
  - Land: 15.83 sq mi (41.00 km^{2})
  - Water: 0.039 sq mi (0.10 km^{2}) 0.25%
- Elevation: 738 ft (225 m)

Population (2020)
  - City: 28,106
  - Density: 1,775.6/sq mi (685.56/km^{2})
  - Urban: 118,369 (US: 286th)
  - Urban density: 1,234/sq mi (476.4/km^{2})
- ZIP Codes: 29621–29626
- Area codes: 864, 821
- FIPS code: 45-01360
- GNIS feature ID: 2403098
- Website: cityofandersonsc.com

Anderson is a city in and the county seat of Anderson County, South Carolina, United States. The population was 28,106 at the 2020 census, making it the 16th-most populous city in South Carolina. It is one of the principal cities in the Greenville-Anderson-Greer, SC Metropolitan Statistical Area, which had an estimated population of 975,480 in 2023. It is included in the larger Greenville-Spartanburg-Anderson, SC Combined Statistical Area, which had an estimated population of 1,590,636 in 2023.

It is just off Interstate 85 and is 120 miles (190 km) from Atlanta and 140 miles (230 km) from Charlotte. Anderson is the smallest of the three primary cities that make up the Upstate region, and is nicknamed the "Electric City" and the "Friendliest City in South Carolina".

== History ==
=== Anderson Court House ===
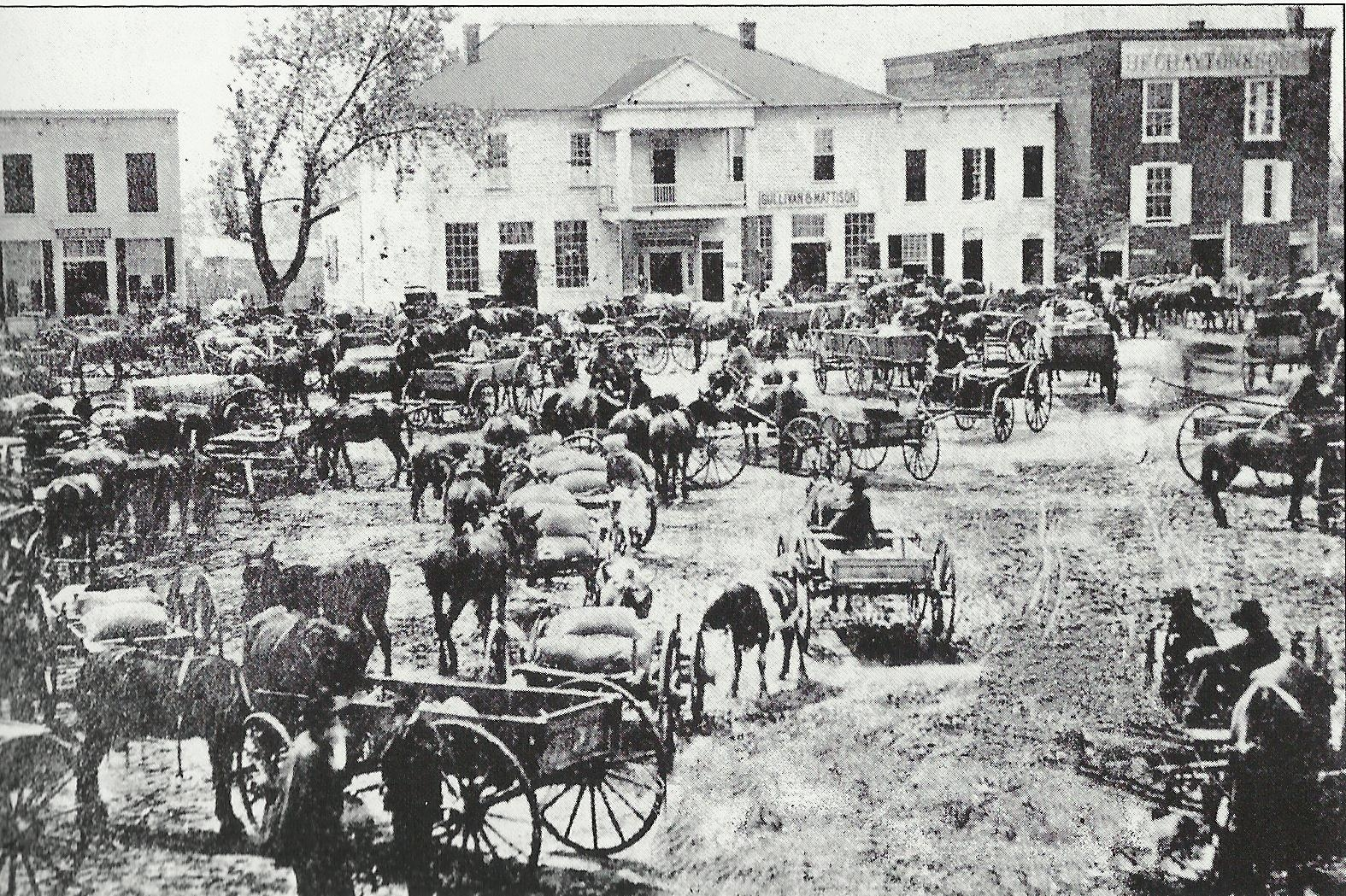
Downtown Anderson in 1876

Cherokee first settled the area of what is today the city of Anderson. During the American Revolution, the Cherokee sided with the British. After the American Revolutionary War, the Cherokee's land was acquired as war reparations and colonized. In 1791, the South Carolina Legislature created the Washington District, which comprised Greenville, Anderson, Oconee, and Pickens Counties. The Washington District was then divided into Greenville and Pendleton districts. Anderson, Pickens, and Oconee comprised the newly created Pendleton district. Anderson was settled in 1826 and incorporated in 1828 as Anderson Court House, separate from the Pendleton district. The name Anderson is in honor of Robert Anderson, who fought in the American Revolutionary War and also explored the Anderson region in the mid-18th century. Anderson District (later Anderson County after 1867) was also established in 1826 out of the Pendleton district.

In 1848, the Johnson Female Seminary was established in Anderson as the first college of the town and was named after William Bullein Johnson. One year later, the seminary was renamed Johnson University. During the American Civil War, Johnson University was closed and converted into a Confederate treasury. On May 1, 1865, Union forces invaded Anderson looking for the Confederate treasury. The treasury office of Anderson was ransacked by Union forces, and the main building of Johnson University was used as a Union headquarters. A minor skirmish erupted at the Battle of Anderson, leading to two Union casualties. After the war, a Union garrison was stationed in Anderson. In 1902, citizens of Anderson erected a 38-foot tall Confederate War Monument that remains intact, in place, and facing the Anderson County Courthouse. "In grateful acknowledgement of their powers in war and of their achievements in peace, this monument is erected, that it may teach the generations of the future the story of the matchless, unfading and undying honor which the Confederate soldier won," and "The world shall yet decide, In truth's clear, far-oil' light. That the soldiers who wore the grey and died With Lee, were in the right."

=== The Electric City ===
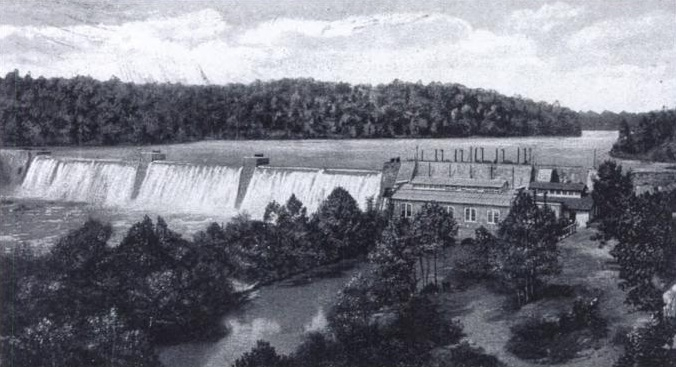
Portman Shoals Power Plant around 1920.

Anderson became one of the first cities in the Southeastern United States to have electricity. Electricity to Anderson was established by William C. Whitner in 1895 at a hydroelectric plant on the Rocky River, giving the city the name the Electric City. Anderson also became the first city in the world to supply a cotton gin by electricity. In 1895, Anderson Court House was renamed to Anderson. In 1897, Whitner's plant was upgraded with a 10,000-volt generating station at Portman Shoals. Whitner's power plant at Portman Shoals became the first hydroelectric plant in the United States to generate high voltage without step-up transformers . The Portman Dam was swept away in 1901, forcing Anderson into darkness until it was rebuilt in 1902.

=== Anderson University ===
In 1911, Anderson College was established by the Anderson Chamber of Commerce. Anderson College was the successor to Johnson University and is affiliated with the South Carolina Baptist Convention. Anderson College became Anderson University. It is accredited as a Level VI institution (offers bachelors, masters, Ph.D. degrees) by the Southern Association of Colleges and Schools Commission on Colleges. As of October 2022, it is the largest private university in South Carolina.

== Geography ==
Anderson is located in the northwest corner of South Carolina on the Piedmont plateau. Anderson is a 1-hour drive from the Blue Ridge Mountains and a 4-hour drive from the South Carolina coast. Anderson lies roughly at the midpoint of the I-85 corridor between Atlanta and Charlotte.

According to the United States Census Bureau, the city has a total area of 15.87 square miles (41.1 km^{2}), of which 15.83 square miles (41.0 km^{2}) is land and 0.04 square miles (0.10 km^{2}) (0.25%) is water.

=== Climate ===
Climate data for Anderson, South Carolina (1991–2020)
Month	Jan	Feb	Mar	Apr	May	Jun	Jul	Aug	Sep	Oct	Nov	Dec	Year
Mean daily maximum °F (°C)	53.2 (11.8)	56.9 (13.8)	64.5 (18.1)	73.2 (22.9)	80.5 (26.9)	87.6 (30.9)	90.7 (32.6)	89.4 (31.9)	83.5 (28.6)	73.7 (23.2)	63.5 (17.5)	55.3 (12.9)	72.7 (22.6)
Daily mean °F (°C)	42.8 (6.0)	46.1 (7.8)	52.8 (11.6)	61.3 (16.3)	69.7 (20.9)	77.3 (25.2)	80.7 (27.1)	79.6 (26.4)	73.6 (23.1)	62.6 (17.0)	52.1 (11.2)	45.3 (7.4)	62.0 (16.7)
Mean daily minimum °F (°C)	32.5 (0.3)	35.3 (1.8)	41.1 (5.1)	49.3 (9.6)	58.8 (14.9)	67.0 (19.4)	70.7 (21.5)	69.7 (20.9)	63.6 (17.6)	51.5 (10.8)	40.8 (4.9)	35.2 (1.8)	51.3 (10.7)
Average precipitation inches (mm)	4.61 (117)	4.37 (111)	4.79 (122)	4.11 (104)	3.64 (92)	4.19 (106)	3.76 (96)	4.76 (121)	3.76 (96)	3.27 (83)	3.98 (101)	5.01 (127)	50.25 (1,276)
Average snowfall inches (cm)	0.2 (0.51)	0.3 (0.76)	0.2 (0.51)	0.0 (0.0)	0.0 (0.0)	0.0 (0.0)	0.0 (0.0)	0.0 (0.0)	0.0 (0.0)	0.0 (0.0)	0.0 (0.0)	0.2 (0.51)	0.9 (2.29)
Source: NOAA

== Demographics ==
Historical population
Census	Pop.	Note	%±
1860	625		—
1870	1,432		129.1%
1880	1,850		29.2%
1890	3,018		63.1%
1900	5,498		82.2%
1910	9,654		75.6%
1920	10,570		9.5%
1930	14,383		36.1%
1940	19,424		35.0%
1950	19,770		1.8%
1960	41,316		109.0%
1970	27,556		−33.3%
1980	27,546		0.0%
1990	26,184		−4.9%
2000	25,514		−2.6%
2010	26,686		4.6%
2020	28,106		5.3%
2025 (est.)	31,323	▲	11.4%
U.S. Decennial Census

=== Racial and ethnic composition ===
Anderson city, South Carolina – Racial and ethnic composition Note: the US Census treats Hispanic/Latino as an ethnic category. This table excludes Latinos from the racial categories and assigns them to a separate category. Hispanics/Latinos may be of any race.
Race / Ethnicity (NH = Non-Hispanic)	Pop 2000	Pop 2010	Pop 2020	% 2000	% 2010	% 2020
White alone (NH)	15,935	15,881	16,392	62.46%	59.51%	58.32%
Black or African American alone (NH)	8,653	8,894	8,276	33.91%	33.33%	29.45%
Native American or Alaska Native alone (NH)	51	63	46	0.20%	0.24%	0.16%
Asian alone (NH)	196	253	416	0.77%	0.95%	1.48%
Native Hawaiian or Pacific Islander alone (NH)	8	4	5	0.03%	0.01%	0.02%
Other race alone (NH)	23	28	117	0.09%	0.10%	0.42%
Mixed race or Multiracial (NH)	271	474	1,105	1.06%	1.78%	3.93%
Hispanic or Latino (any race)	377	1,089	1,749	1.48%	4.08%	6.22%
Total	25,514	26,686	28,106	100.00%	100.00%	100.00%

=== 2020 census ===
As of the 2020 census, Anderson had a population of 28,106, 11,282 households, and 6,112 families residing in the city; the median age was 36.6 years, 21.8% of residents were under the age of 18, and 19.5% were 65 years of age or older, with 81.1 males for every 100 females and 75.9 males for every 100 females age 18 and over.

99.9% of residents lived in urban areas and 0.1% lived in rural areas.

There were 11,282 households in Anderson, of which 28.2% had children under the age of 18 living in them, 33.3% were married-couple households, 20.1% were male householder households with no spouse or partner present, and 40.6% were female householder households with no spouse or partner present; 36.0% of all households were made up of individuals and 15.8% had someone living alone who was 65 years of age or older.

There were 12,695 housing units, of which 11.1% were vacant; the homeowner vacancy rate was 2.6% and the rental vacancy rate was 10.5%.

Racial composition as of the 2020 census
Race	Number	Percent
White	16,721	59.5%
Black or African American	8,335	29.7%
American Indian and Alaska Native	58	0.2%
Asian	417	1.5%
Native Hawaiian and Other Pacific Islander	5	0.0%
Some other race	716	2.5%
Two or more races	1,854	6.6%

=== 2000 census ===
At the 2000 census, there were 25,514 people, 10,641 households, and 6,299 families residing in the city. The population density was 1,843.7 people/sq mi (711.8/km^{2}). The 12,068 housing units averaged 872.1/sq mi (336.7/km^{2}). The racial makeup of the city was 63.12% White, 34.01% African American, 0.22% Native American, 0.78% Asian American, 0.72% from other races, and 1.16% from two or more races. Hispanics or Latinos of any race were 1.48% of the population.

== Cityscape ==
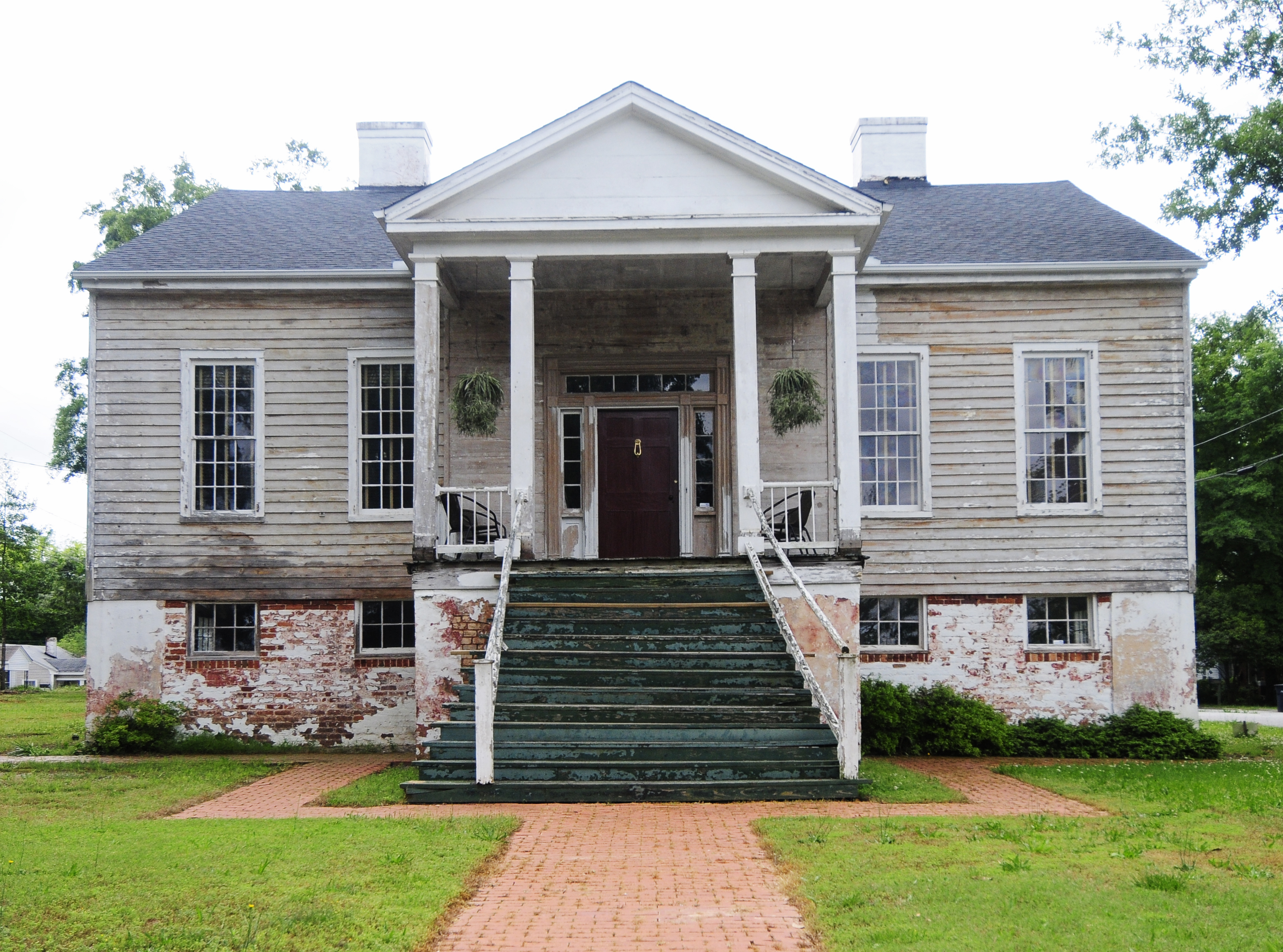
The Caldwell-Johnson-Morris Cottage was built around 1851

=== Historic districts ===
- Anderson College Historic District
- Anderson Downtown Historic District
- Anderson Historic District
- McDuffie Street Historic District
- North Anderson Historic District
- South Boulevard Historic District
- Westside Historic District
- Whitner Street Historic District

=== Other historical locations ===
- Caldwell-Johnson-Morris Cottage
- Denver Downs Farmstead
- Kennedy Street School
- Dr. Samuel Marshall Orr House
- Ralph John Ramer House

=== Parks ===
- Anderson Memorial Stadium, ballfield/stadium on 12 acres (4.9 ha) of land on White Road, it was renovated in 2007 with stadium-style seating. It is home to the Anderson University Trojans.
- Anderson Sports and Entertainment Center, 300-acre (120 ha) park, it includes the Anderson Civic Center, a 37,000-square-foot (3,400 m^{2}) facility, as well as one of South Carolina's largest amphitheaters that can accommodate 15,000 people, a huge castle-like play structure with play equipment, a 64-acre (26 ha) sports center with seven baseball/softball fields, three soccer fields, a disc golf course, and eight tennis courts. The lake has a park, picnic shelters, and miles of nature trails. The center is Anderson's largest recreational area.
- Rocky River Nature Conservancy, a nature reserve started by Anderson University to protect wetlands habitats. It has a lot of trails and a boardwalk over the wetlands. It is named after the Rocky River which runs through the conservancy.

== Economy ==
Anderson is home to the largest Glen Raven, Inc. manufacturing center facility, which focuses on manufacturing Sunbrella fabrics. Anderson's economy revolves around manufacturing. It has over 230 manufacturers, including 22 international companies. In the county, Anderson has a thriving business climate. Its top major industries include manufacturers of automotive products, metal products, industrial machinery, plastics, publishing, and textiles. Two industries that many times interconnect are the plastic and automotive sectors. More than 27 BMW suppliers are the Upstate region, which is recognized internationally as an automotive supplier hub. The plastics industry has a strong presence in the Upstate, with 244 plastic companies located within the 10 counties of the state's northwest corner. Anderson County, in particular, has 11 automotive suppliers and is a major player in the plastic industry, with 27 plastics companies located within its borders.

== Hospitals ==
AnMed is one of the top employers in the county, and the primary healthcare network for Anderson. AnMed Medical Center is the main medical facility, offering all the amenities of a standard hospital, as well as a heart and vascular center, and stroke/neurological center. Located 2.5 miles north of the facility is the AnMed North Campus, which includes minor care, cancer center, speech and occupational therapy, and more. The AnMed Rehabilitation Hospital is located between the two facilities. AnMed has recently received national attention being awarded the "National Presidents Circle Award," and the "American College of Cardiology Foundation’s 2012 NCDR ACTION Registry–GWTG Platinum Performance Achievement Award."

In addition to these three network hospitals, AnMed also operates several smaller facilities throughout the city and county that range from a free clinic and minor care to doctor's offices.

== Education ==
The city of Anderson is served by the Anderson County School System (specifically, Anderson School District Five). The school district has 11 elementary schools, five middle schools, and two high schools. Anderson is also home to Anderson University, a private university with roughly 3,900 undergraduate and graduate students.

=== Elementary schools ===
- Calhoun Academy of the Arts
- Centerville Elementary
- Concord Elementary
- Homeland Park Primary School
- McLees Academy of Leadership
- Midway Elementary School of Science and Engineering
- Nevitt Forest Community School of Innovation
- New Prospect STEM Academy
- North Pointe Elementary School
- Varennes Academy of Communications and Technology
- Whitehall Elementary, A Global Communication School

=== Middle schools ===
- Glenview Middle School
- McCants Middle School
- Robert Anderson Middle School
- Southwood Academy of the Arts

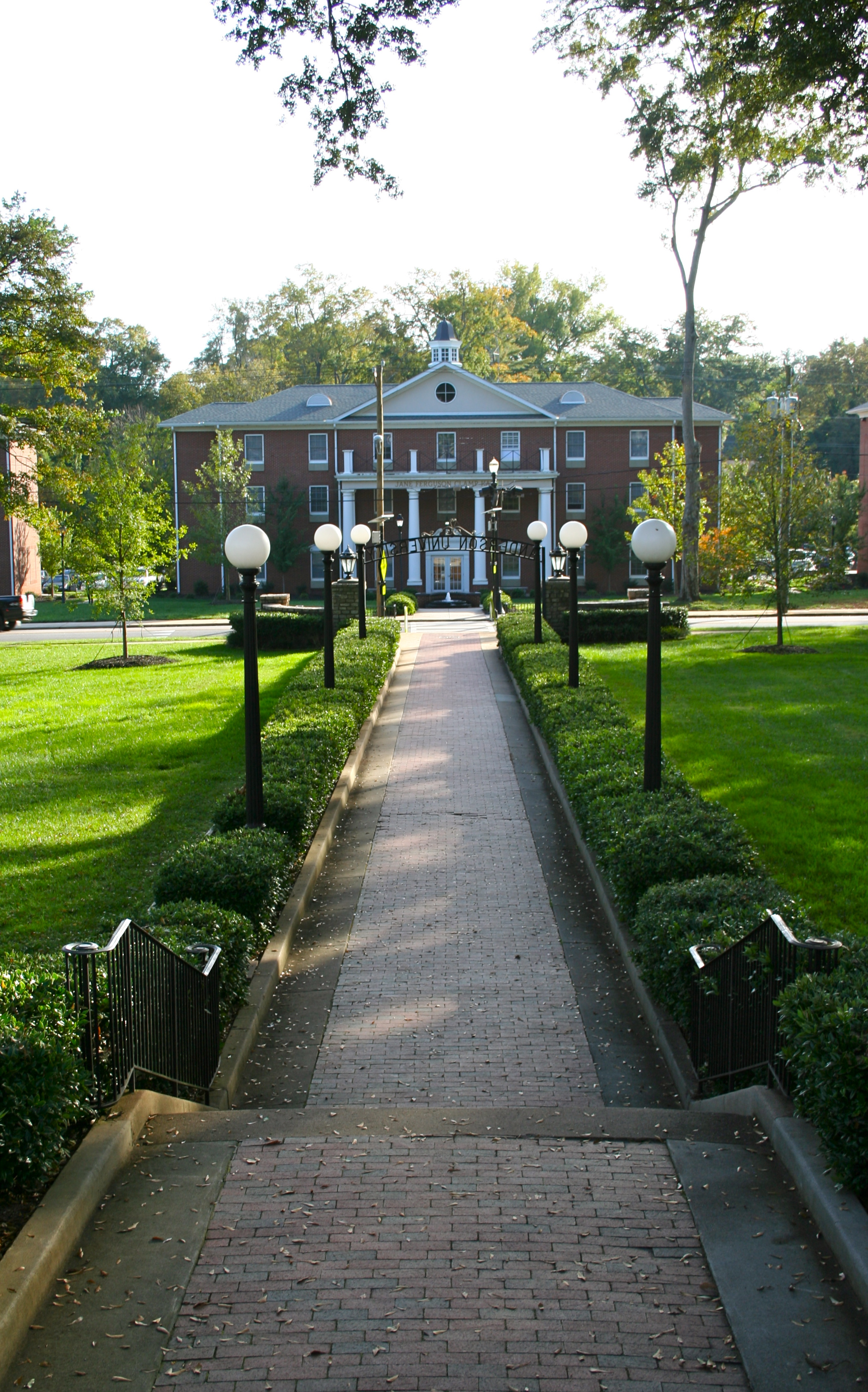
Anderson University

=== High schools ===
- Westside High School
- T. L. Hanna High School
- Anderson Five Career Campus

=== Private schools ===
- Anderson Christian School (PK-12)
- First Presbyterian Church Day School (PK)
- Grace Kindergarten
- Montessori School of Anderson (PK-12)
- New Covenant School (PK-12)
- Learn Upstate Hybrid Academy (PK-12)
- Oakwood Christian School (K-12)
- St. Joseph Catholic School (PK-8)
- Temple Christian Academy (K-12)
- West Anderson Christian Academy (PK/K)

=== Higher education ===
- Anderson University
- Tri-County Technical College
- Carolina Bible College

=== Library ===
Anderson has a public library, a branch of the Anderson County Library System.

== Transportation ==
=== Airports ===
Anderson is served by Anderson Regional Airport. The airport is 3 miles (4.8 km) away from Anderson and has two runways; runway 5/23 is 6,000 feet (1,800 m) and runway 17/35 is 5,000 feet (1,500 m). The airport also has helipads. The airport has no control tower but can accommodate regional jet aircraft. In addition, the airport has a small terminal.

The nearest airport with commercial service is Greenville–Spartanburg International Airport, about 42 miles (68 km) away.

=== Roads and highways ===
Anderson has five signed exits on I-85, currently the city's only freeway. Several notable highways pass through the city, including US 29, US 76, US 178 (co-signed along Clemson Boulevard, also known as SC 28 Bus.), and SC 187.

In 2011, construction began on a new east–west connector that is about 3 miles (4,800 m) long between Clemson Boulevard and South Carolina Highway 81. On August 16, 2010, the connector was voted to have four lanes with turn and bike lanes, and a completion date set in October 2012.

=== Public transit ===
Anderson has six bus routes that travel to most major areas of the city, running every hour. The city also receives service from Clemson Area Transit (CATS) via the 4U route. The city uses both newer hybrid buses and older style trolleys resembling Anderson's old streetcars. Inter-city bus travel is available through Greyhound Lines.

One of the Southeast High-Speed Rail Corridor alternatives for a Charlotte - Greenville - Atlanta route includes a stop at Anderson. This would mark the first time that passenger rail reached Anderson, since the passing of Piedmont and Northern Railway in ca. 1947 and the Blue Ridge Railway in ca. 1951 from Anderson.

== Notable people ==
- Ken Alexander (born 1953), racing driver
- G. Ross Anderson (1929–2020), judge
- Kip Anderson (1938–2007), singer
- Milledge Lipscomb Bonham (1854–1943), judge
- Chadwick Boseman (1976–2020), actor
- Ben Boulware (born 1994), American football player
- Lou Brissie (1924–2013), baseball player
- Kevin L. Bryant (born 1967), politician
- Mark Burns (born 1979), minister, televangelist and politician
- Milford Burriss (1937–2016), politician
- Jonathan Byrd (born 1978), golfer
- Robert Califf (born 1951), cardiologist
- Yung Carter (born 1992), record producer
- Jones M. Chamblee (born 1936), politician
- Don Chapman, politician
- Elizabeth Spann Craig, writer
- Pete Crayton (1894–1958), college football coach and businessman
- Charles E. Daniel (1895–1964), politician
- Kit DeCamps (1878–1951), American soldier, engineer and football player
- Guy Davenport (1927–2005), writer and painter
- John Davis (1954–2021), singer
- Jack Deloplaine (1954–2022), American football player
- Annie Dove Denmark (1887–1974), educator
- Jonathan Dickson, actor
- Shaun Ellis (born 1977), American football player
- Tom Ervin (born 1952), judge and politician
- Dillard Rucker Fant (1841–1908), cattle driver and soldier
- John Cannon Few (born 1963), judge
- Wentford Gaines (born 1953), American football player
- Kristie Greene (born 1970), beauty pageant titleholder
- Brandon Micheal Hall (born 1993), actor
- Nick Hampton (born 2000), American football player
- Bailey Hanks (born 1988), singer, actress and dancer
- Rogers Sanders Harris (1930–2017), prelate
- Jonathon D. Hill (born 1985), politician
- Manse Jolly (died 1869), soldier
- Preston Jones (born 1970), American football player
- James "Radio" Kennedy (1946–2019), man known for his association with the T. L. Hanna High School football team
- John Linley (1916–1996), photographer and architect
- Rafael Little (born 1986), gridiron football player
- Rip Major (1889–1934), American football player, coach and athletics administrator
- Johnny Mann (1928–2019), arranger, composer, conductor, entertainer and singer
- James M. Masters Sr. (1911–1988), military officer
- Newton A. McCully (1867–1951), military officer
- Sammy Meeks (1923–2007), baseball player
- Adam Minarovich, actor, screenwriter and film director
- Charles Murphey (1799–1861), politician
- Larry Nance (born 1959), basketball player
- James Lawrence Orr (1822–1873), politician
- Lu Parker (born 1968), beauty pageant titleholder, journalist, activist and speaker
- Victoria "Porkchop" Parker, drag queen and actor
- Mary Lou Parks (1939–2015), politician
- Zacch Pickens (born 2000), American football player
- Wesley Quinn, dancer and singer
- Jim Rice (born 1953), baseball player
- Terence Roberts (born 1959 or 1960), politician
- Saudia Roundtree (born 1974), basketball player
- William Schilletter (1893–1974), American football player and military officer
- Cole Seiler (born 1994), soccer player
- Muhammad Shamsid-Deen (born 1969), American football player
- William Percy Sharpe (1871–1942), politician
- Lily Strickland (1884–1958), composer, painter and writer
- Jessica Stroup (born 1986), actress
- Jack Swilling (1830–1878), pioneer
- Ben Taylor (1888–1953), baseball player
- C. I. Taylor (1875–1922), baseball player and manager
- Candy Jim Taylor (1884–1948), baseball player
- Steel Arm Johnny Taylor (1879–1956), baseball player
- O. Rogeriee Thompson (born 1951), judge
- Albert Wheeler Todd (1856–1924), architect
- Annie Tribble (1932–2013), basketball coach
- James Michael Tyler (1962–2021), actor
- Derek Watson (born 1981), gridiron football player
- George Webster (1945–2007), American football player
- Felix Zollicoffer Wilson (1866–1950), politician
- Tony Young (born 1962), martial artist and teacher

== Sister cities ==
Anderson has two sister cities, as designated by Sister Cities International:

- Carrickfergus, County Antrim, Northern Ireland, United Kingdom
- Comhairle nan Eilean Siar, Scotland, United Kingdom

== See also ==
- List of municipalities in South Carolina
